= Krasny Oktyabr (steel plant) =

Russian company

VMZ Krasny Oktyabr CJSC

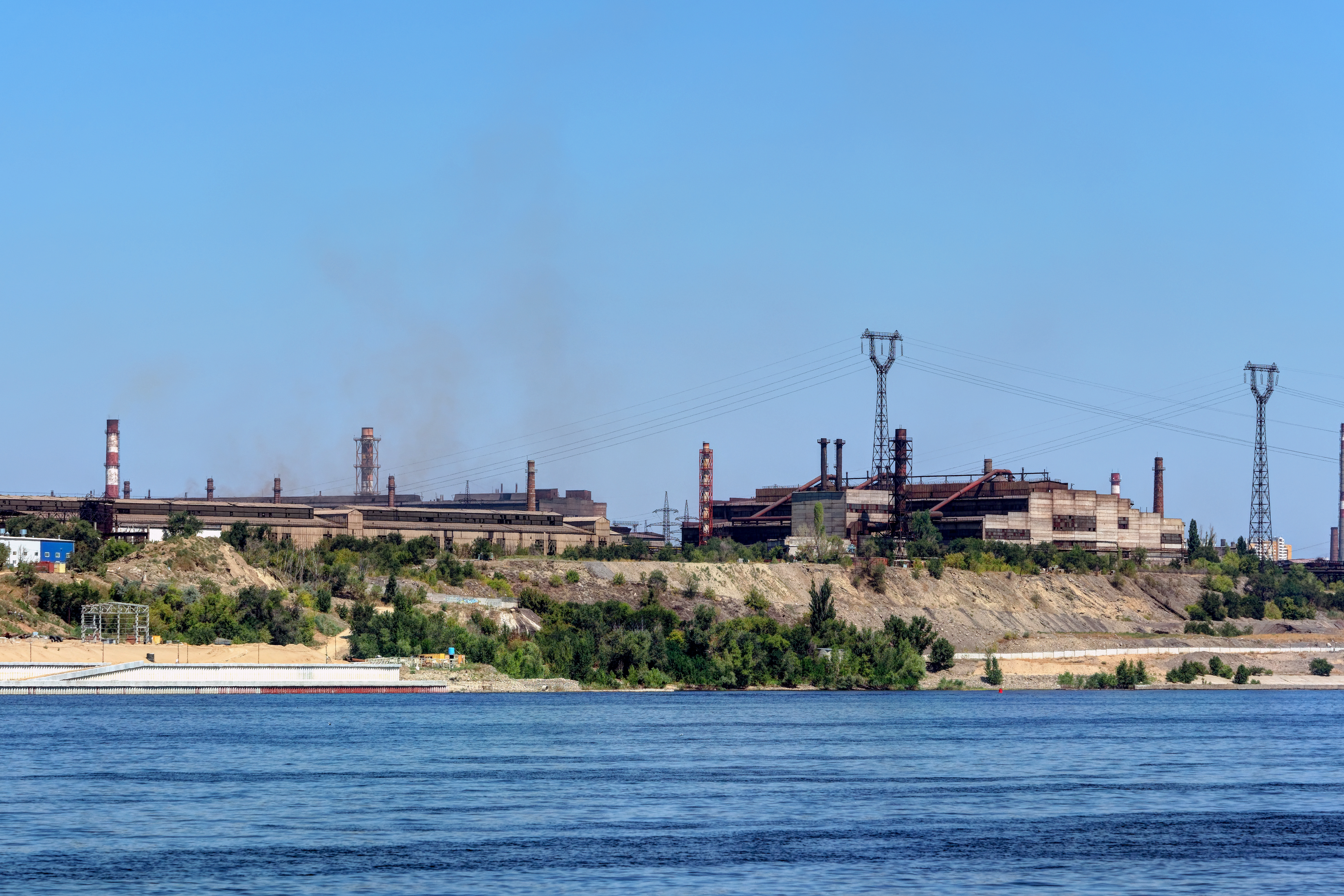
- Volgograd Steel Works "Red October"
- Company type: Closed joint-stock company
- Industry: Ferrous metallurgy
- Headquarters: Volgograd, Russia
- Key people: Dmitry Gerasimenko (executive director)
- Revenue: 100,000,000 United States dollar (1994)
- Number of employees: ca 800 (2017)

Volgogradskiy Metallurgicheskiy Zavod Krasny Oktyabr (Russian: Закрытое акционерное общество "Волгоградский металлургический завод "Красный Октябрь", romanized: Zakrytoye aktsionernoye obshchestvo "Volgogradskiy metallurgicheskiy zavod "Krasny Oktyabr") is a Russian closed joint-stock company which maintains the Krasny Oktyabr factory, one of the largest Russian metallurgy facilities.

== History ==
The company's factory was established on April 30, 1897, by the French Ural-Volga Metallurgical Society (Russian: «Урало-Волжское металлургическое общество»). After the Bolshevik Revolution the factory became known as Krasny Oktyabr, Russian: "Red October" (named for the October 1917 Revolution) To the west, it was widely known as the Red October Factory. The factory provided steel for the Stalingrad Tractor Factory. It was completely destroyed in the Battle of Stalingrad, but was restored by 1946. During the Soviet era it was awarded the Order of Lenin and the Order of the Red Banner of Labour.

=== 1999 bankruptcy ===
In 1999, Krasny Oktyabr entered bankruptcy hearings.

In 2003, the Midland Group gained control of Krasny Oktyabr.

In 2007, Rosoboronexport gained control of Krasny Oktyabr through its subsidiary Russpetsstal which purchased a 100% stake in Krasny Oktyabr from the Alex Shnaider (Russian: Алекс Шнайдер) and Eduard Shifrin (Russian: Эдуард Шифрин) associated Midland Group. In 2007 under advice from Troika Dialog and its managing director Sergey Skvortsov, Sergey Chemezov, who was the General Director of Rostec, formed one holding for all enterprises manufacturing special steels and alloys. On 28 November 2007, Krasny Oktyabr under general director Sergey Nosov (Russian: Сергей Носов) was placed in a holding CJSC Russpetsstal (Russian: ЗАО «Русспецсталь») which RosTec, a firm which was formerly known as Rosoboronexport until 25 November 2007, held a 25.1% stake through its subsidiary Promimpex (Russian: «Промимпекс») and a 50% stake was held in two Cyprus based firms Lacoveta Management and Briefway Trading, and a 24.9% stake was held by the Guernsey based Midland Steel Industries Limited. For financing both JSC Russpetsstal (Russian: ОАО «Русспецсталь») and CSJC Russpetsstal in the holding Russpetsstal, VTB provided 1.7 billion rubles in early 2007 and 1.96 billion rubles at the end of 2007, Sberbank provided almost 2 billion rubles in 2008–2009 in addition to the 1 billion rubles that Krasny Oktyabr obtained from Sberbank in 2006, Gazprombank provided 1.8 billion rubles in 2008, and Bank Rossiya provided 1.3 billion rubles to Ступинская металлургическая компания (Stupinskaya Metallurgical Company) which was held by JSC Russpetsstal.

=== 2009 bankruptcy ===
The company entered bankruptcy proceedings in 2009 with Andrey Akimov as interim director. In 2013 it came under the ownership of Dmitry Gerasimenko. (Note: Dmitro Gerasimenko, who began his career with Dneprospetsstal (Russian: «Днепроспецстал»), placed numerous persons from Dneprospetsstal at positions at Krasny Oktyabr including his mother Svetlana Borisovna Gerasimenko, who became financial director and conducts her business with Krasny Oktyabr over the phone from her home in Dnipr where she instructs her fellow accountants and bookkeepers where to write each number for the various forms and financial documents, Eduard Shifrin, who worked with Svetlana Gerasimenko at Dneprospetsstal, Vadim Leibenzon, who Gerasimenko calls his “right hand” and in the early 1990s led the steel shop at Dneprospetsstal and became general director of Dneprospetsstal in 1998-2001 and 2003-2004, and Konstantin Ryabov, who became the president of Red October International and was very close to Viktor Pinchuk who had been a co-owner of Dneprospetsstal until 2008.) In November 2016, Gerasimenko was detained in Cyprus on fraud charges, over the alleged theft of a $65 million loan from VTB Bank. Gerasimenko believed that representatives of Uralvagonzavod and Oleg Sienko, who was the general director of Uralvagonzavod, represents Rostec, and is a protege of Sergey Chemezov, were involved in stealing the proceeds from the loan before the funds were received by Gerasimenko and Krasny Okyabr. In 2016, Sienko stated, "In fact, all the profitability that we have goes to servicing the loan portfolio." In March 2017, Alexander Potapov (Russian: Alexander Valerievich Potapov) replaced Sienko as head of Uralvagonzavod due to financial abuse.

For his freedom from incarceration, Dmitry Gerasimenko "sold" the plant, which was in bankruptcy proceedings, to Pavel Krotov in late November 2018. (Note: Pavel Krotov is a friend of Oleg Deripaska and Ramzan Kadyrov.)

=== 2018 state-backed financial rescue ===
The plant was preserved in 2018 with government intervention. A subsidiary, Volgograd Drilling Equipment Plant was restarted in 2020. After six years of inactivity, the company is reviving. VZBT retained its main activity - the production of drilling rigs.

The stainless steel production was 34093 tons in 2020, compared to 2019, which was 26281 tons.

== Production delays ==
During the War in Ukraine, "the full development of the factory is hindered by a large number of debts, including to commercial banks" causing financial difficulties which disrupted production at Krasny Oktyabr and Uralvagonzavod so significantly that, in 2019, the 2013 order for pressure reactor containers for nuclear powered submarines was not completed, and the 2012 order for the initial 132 T-14 Armata MBT or 44 tanks annually, which were to be delivered in 2015 for experimental testing, had not been fulfilled but instead Uralvagonzavod "will supply only 16 vehicles by the end of 2019" or later and would not complete the initial order until after 2021 or later.

=== Submarines ===
In late November 2017, only three of the eight pressure reactor containers for Russian nuclear submarines could be delivered in May 2018 on time from a 2013 order. The remaining delivery of the other five hulls was frozen. Because of ongoing financial difficulties, Krasny Oktyabr had reduced its work force from 5,200 employees in December 2016 to less than 4,000 in October 2017 and then to only 800 with a 20% to 30% reduction in salary and pay. Both Dmitry Gerasimenko and his mother Svetlana Gerasimenko, who lives in Dnepr, are Ukrainian citizens.

=== Malachite armor for T-14 Armata ===
To support Uralvagonzavod's T-14 Armata, Krasny Oktyabr is participating in the production of the "Malachite" dynamic protection armour with the 44S-sv-Sh (Russian: «44С-Св-Ш») steel which was developed by Moscow's Scientific Research Institute of Steel (Russian: Научно-исследовательский институт стали («НИИ стали»)) (Note: Located in Moscow, the OOO Steel Research Institute is also known as the OOO Research Institute of Steel or OOO Institute of Steel Research or OOO Scientific Research Institute of Steel or OOO Scientific Steel Research Institute or NII Stali (Russian: АО «НИИ стали»).) and intended to meet STANAG 4569 Level 5 standards for protection against 7.62-14.5 mm caliber heavy armor-piercing bullets and have improved cold weather protection for use in the Arctic environment. Malachite is a fourth generation armor, which is a modular complex of built-in dynamic protection, and will be used on the Armata platforms. (Note: Armata platforms include the T-14 Armata main battle tank (Object 148), which will replace the T-90 series and earlier main battle tanks, the T-15 Armata heavy infantry fighting vehicle (Object 149), which will replace the BMP-2 infantry fighting vehicle, the Terminator 3 urban area armoured fighting vehicle, the Kurganets-25 infantry fighting vehicle and armored personnel carrier, the VPK-7829 Bumerang amphibious wheeled infantry fighting vehicle and armored personnel carrier, the 2S35 Koalitsiya-SV self-propelled artillery, and the proposed BREM-T T-16 armoured recovery vehicle (Object 152), which will replace the BREM-1M armour repair and recovery vehicle.) Numerous financial difficulties at Krasny Oktyabr resulted in production delays of the ultra high strength armoured steel "44S-Sv-Sh".
