= Andrey Borodin =

Russian banker and economist (born 1967)

- Born: Andrey Fridrikhovich Borodin; 24 May 1967 (age 59); Moscow, Russian SFSR, Soviet Union
- Occupation: Banker
- Known for: President of Bank of Moscow and subsequent criminal investigation for his actions at the bank, since then living in exile in the UK
- Spouse: Tatiana Korsakova (m. 2011)
- Children: 2

Andrey Fridrikhovich Borodin (Russian: Андре́й Фри́дрихович Бороди́н; born Moscow, 24 May 1967) is a Russian financial expert, economist, businessman and racing driver who until 2011 was President of Bank of Moscow. He and his first deputy Dmitri Akulinin were dismissed from office by the court for the period of the investigation due to the Premier Estate criminal case, charged with abuse of authority. In April 2011, the meeting of the bank's shareholders dismissed them.

Since April 2011, Borodin has lived in London, England, and since November 2011 until May 2016 has been on an Interpol Red Notice, wanted as a suspect in a 13-billion-rouble fraud committed in Bank of Moscow under his governance. In August 2012 he bought Park Place, a house near Henley-on-Thames. He was granted political asylum in the UK in February 2013.

== Education and early career ==
Borodin served in the KGB Border Troops from 1985 to 1987. Following his service, he enrolled at the Moscow Finance Institute. From 1989 to 1990, while at the Moscow Finance Institute, he studied economics as a visiting student at the University of Passau, Germany, and then returned to Moscow and graduated with a degree in International Economics and Finance from the International Economics Department at the Moscow Finance Institute in 1991. For two years, he worked for Dresdner Bank in Germany – which has ties to former members of the KGB and Stasi services – on an 18-month training course in Dortmund, then moved to Frankfurt and worked at the bank's head office in the Financial Institutions Department. He left Dresdner Bank in late 1993, (Note: In 1990, Matthias Warnig became the head of Dresdner Bank's Russian operations and established the first branch of Dresdner Bank in Russia at Saint Petersburg.) moved to Moscow, and in March 1994, was introduced to the Mayor of Moscow, Yury Luzhkov by Lev Alaluev (Russian: Лев Алалуев), and started working for the Government of Moscow as an economics and finance adviser to the Luzhkov.

His relationships with Luzhkov, currently persona non grata in Russia since his dismissal by then-president Dmitry Medvedev in 2010, have been important for both his rise and current problems.

== Bank of Moscow ==
What became one of the biggest players in Russian banking began as a six-person operation founded in 1995 by the Moscow City Government, which originally held a 51% stake. Under the political patronage of Luzhkov and the leadership of Borodin, it weathered the crisis of 1998 and subsequently grew rapidly from a local bank largely serving the City Government to a national bank with a greatly enlarged client base and offering a broad range of services. The bank became increasingly independent of the City Government, which in 2008 reduced its stake to 46.6%, with a corresponding reduction in the number of bank-appointed directors. As the bank expanded, Borodin and his ally Lev Alaluev purchased significant stakes of their own – more than 20.32%. There was no evidence on how Borodin and Alaluev got the necessary funding for such a big purchase.

=== Krasny Oktyabr ===
The Andrei Borodin-led Bank of Moscow was a large creditor of Krasny Oktyabr when it declared bankruptcy in 2009. Andrey Akimov, as the interim manager of the plant, appointed the Ukrainian Dmitro Gerasimenko, who is the owner of Dieg-Impex LLC (Russian: ООО «Диег-Импэкс»), to be executive director of Krasny Oktyabr (Note: Dmitro Gerasimenko, who began his career with Dneprospetsstal (Russian: «Днепроспецстал»), placed numerous persons from Dneprospetsstal at positions at Krasny Oktyabr including his mother Svetlana Gerimenko, who became financial director, Eduard Shifrin, who worked with Svetlana Gerasimenko at Dneprospetsstal, Vadim Leibenzon, who Gerasimenko calls his "right hand" and in the early 1990s led the steel shop at Dneprospetsstal and became general director of Dneprospetsstal in 1998-2001 and 2003-2004, and Konstantin Ryabov, who became the president of Red October International and was very close to Viktor Pinchuk who had been a co-owner of Dneprospetsstal until 2008.) and who in November 2018 "sold" the plant to Pavel Krotov. (Note: Pavel Krotov is a friend of Oleg Deripaska and Ramzan Kadyrov.)

=== Bank of Moscow internationally known ===
Bank of Moscow enjoyed the confidence of the international markets, with both Goldman Sachs and Credit Suisse acquiring small stakes in 2010 (3.88% and 2.77% respectively).

=== Bank of Moscow takeover ===
When Luzhkov was dismissed in September 2010, the new mayor Sergei Sobyanin announced the intention to sell the stake of the Moscow government in Bank of Moscow. VTB, a state-controlled bank, stepped up as a buyer. Other banks, such as Alfa Bank and Bank Austria, a subsidiary of UniCredit, also expressed interest.

In December 2010, before the sale of the City Government's stake took place, the Audit Chamber of the Russian Federation announced that it had launched an audit of Bank of Moscow at Sobyanin's request. The investigation revealed a loan provided by the bank to Premier Estate Company.

At the end of February 2011, VTB purchased the City Government's stake from Central Fuel Company. The VTB deal was opposed by Borodin. He resisted attempts by VTB to acquire control of the bank, already being one of the main shareholders.

Borodin has contested the legality of this on a number of grounds, including that competitive tender ought to have been used to maximise the share price. None of the protests were found correct or justified by the court. Borodin and his allies were dismissed, and VTB's Chairman Andrey Kostin and first deputy Mikhail Kuzovlev became the Bank's Chairman of the Board of Directors and President respectively.

In early April 2011, Borodin and Lev Alaluyev sold their 20.32% stake in Bank of Moscow. Andrey Borodin sold his shares to Vitaly Yusufov, son of the former Russian Energy Minister Igor Yusufov. Vitaly Yusufov had borrowed US$1.1 billion from Bank of Moscow for this acquisition. Borodin was still in charge of the bank, when this decision was made.

In July 2011, Yusufov sold his stake to VTB, which in September 2012 controlled more than 95.50 percent of the shares of Bank of Moscow. Yusufov claimed, that he acted on his own judgment. That was the reason why the price negotiations with VTB took so long.

Borodin claims that peculiarities during the takeover point to the centrality of political as opposed to commercial concerns. For example, he made an offer on 22 March 2011, which lapsed 8 April 2011, to buy the stake from VTB as the same price they had, despite VTB's claims of the mess they had discovered. This was refused, because there was no official offer sent.

=== Bank of Moscow bail-out and criminal charges ===
After the takeover, VTB and finance minister Alexei Kudrin (who was the head of Supervisory Council of VTB during the takeover) announced that the bank's former management, led by Andrei Borodin, created a "large, special portfolio loan book" totaling 366 billion roubles to lend to itself and related parties. Among these loans, some 250 billion roubles has been identified as falling in a "zone of risk", and 150 out of 250 billion were 'very bad' and lacked collateral.

In July 2011, it was announced that Bank of Moscow would receive a US$14 billion bail-out from the Russian state.

In February 2012, Russia's Interior Ministry opened a new criminal case against Borodin and Dmitry Akulinin, over the theft of 6.7 billion roubles at the Bank. According to the investigator, Borodin and Akulinin, in 2008 through 2011, using their office position, arranged the transfer of at least 7.8 billion roubles from a correspondent account of the Bank of Moscow to the accounts of commercial companies registered in Cyprus. None of the firms involved in the criminal scheme engaged in any financial or economic activity. The settlement accounts of the fly-by-night firms were serviced by a Cyprus bank.

In March 2012, Investigative Committee spokesman Vladimir Markin announced the case over a 1.7 billion-rouble damage caused to the Bank of Moscow was being investigated. The Bank of Moscow and the Moscow government held a controlling stake in "City Insurance Group". Fearing the loss of control over the company's activities and the transfer of 50% plus one share to the VTB bank, the former president and vice-president of the Bank of Moscow, Andrei Borodin and Dmitry Akulinin, devised a criminal scheme in which they involved subordinates from the administrations of affiliates. As a result of transactions with securities from October 2010 through March 2011, the control over City Insurance Group passed to an offshore company, which caused a 1,708,635,380-rouble damage to the Bank of Moscow and its affiliates.

In October 2012, Russian investigators froze Borodin's assets, over $400 million, held in bank accounts in Switzerland, Belgium, and Luxembourg. His Bank of Moscow shares were also seized.

In March 2013, international auditors from Deloitte Touche CIS confirmed the violations of the former senior management of Bank of Moscow during the period from January 2007 until March 2011. The auditors discovered that all loan agreements signed during that period had no conclusions from the bank's credit risk department, which means the department never analysed the potential borrowers' financial status. In addition, in some cases the collaterals used to secure the loans were not evaluated at their market value. Therefore, the international auditors have drawn the same conclusions as those from the Bank of Russia audit conducted in March–July 2011.

== Exile and political asylum in the UK ==
In August 2012, Borodin bought Park Place, Britain's most expensive house, near Henley-on-Thames, and paid £140 million ($219 million) for it.

Speaking to Vedomosti newspaper on 1 March 2013, he said he had been granted political asylum in the UK "a few days ago" after his lawyers submitted a request. He also accused Russian Prime Minister Dmitry Medvedev, who was the country's president when the criminal case was launched, of being the "chief initiator of all this persecution and hounding".

In May 2016, it was reported that a Russian Court had ordered the seizure of Andrei Borodin's Park Place mansion in Henley-on-Thames.

Since 2022, Borodin has competed in the British GT Championship and GT Cup Championship with Greystone GT, having previously competed in both the Porsche Sprint Challenge series.

== Racing record ==
=== Career summary ===
Season	Series	Team	Races	Wins	Poles	FLaps	Podiums	Points	Position
2020	Porsche Sprint Challenge Great Britain	IN2 Racing	2	0	0	0	0	N/A	NC
2021	Britcar Endurance Championship	Greystone GT	2	0	0	0	0	38	26th
2022	GT Cup Championship – GT3	Greystone GT							
2022	British GT Championship – GT3	Greystone GT	1	0	0	0	0	N/A	NC
2023	British GT Championship – GT3	Greystone GT	6	0	0	0	0	0	21st*
2023	GT Cup Championship – Group GT3	Greystone GT	10	0	1	1	4	100.5	7th*
2024	International GT Open	Greystone GT	9	0	0	0	0	0	61st
2024	GT Cup Championship – Group GT3	Greystone GT							
2025	British GT Championship – GT3	Greystone GT							
2026	International GT Open	Greystone GT	9	0	0	0	0	0	62nd

^{*} Season still in progress.
