= Michael Spink =

British property developer (born 1966)

- Born: Michael Alastair Spink; April 1966 (age 60); Barkston Ash, West Riding of Yorkshire, England
- Occupation: Property developer
- Known for: sold Park Place near Henley-on-Thames to Andrey Borodin for £140m in 2011, then Britain's most expensive home
- Title: CEO and Founder, Spink
- Spouse: Maria Gripenberg (m. 2003)

Michael Alastair Spink (born April 1966) is a British property developer, a founder of SPINK, a British architectural design practice, and master builder.

== Biography ==
In 2011, Spink sold historic Grade II Listed country house Park Place, near Henley-on-Thames, to Andrey Borodin for £140m. At the time, Park Place was Britain's most expensive home. In 2014, his company bought the disused Brompton Road underground station for redevelopment. Fayland House, built for Spink in 2013, was named best house in the Architectural Review House Awards 2015.

== Personal life ==
Spink married Maria Gripenberg in 2003.
