= National University of Science and Technology MISIS =

University in Moscow, Russia

- Национальный исследовательский технологический университет МИСиС
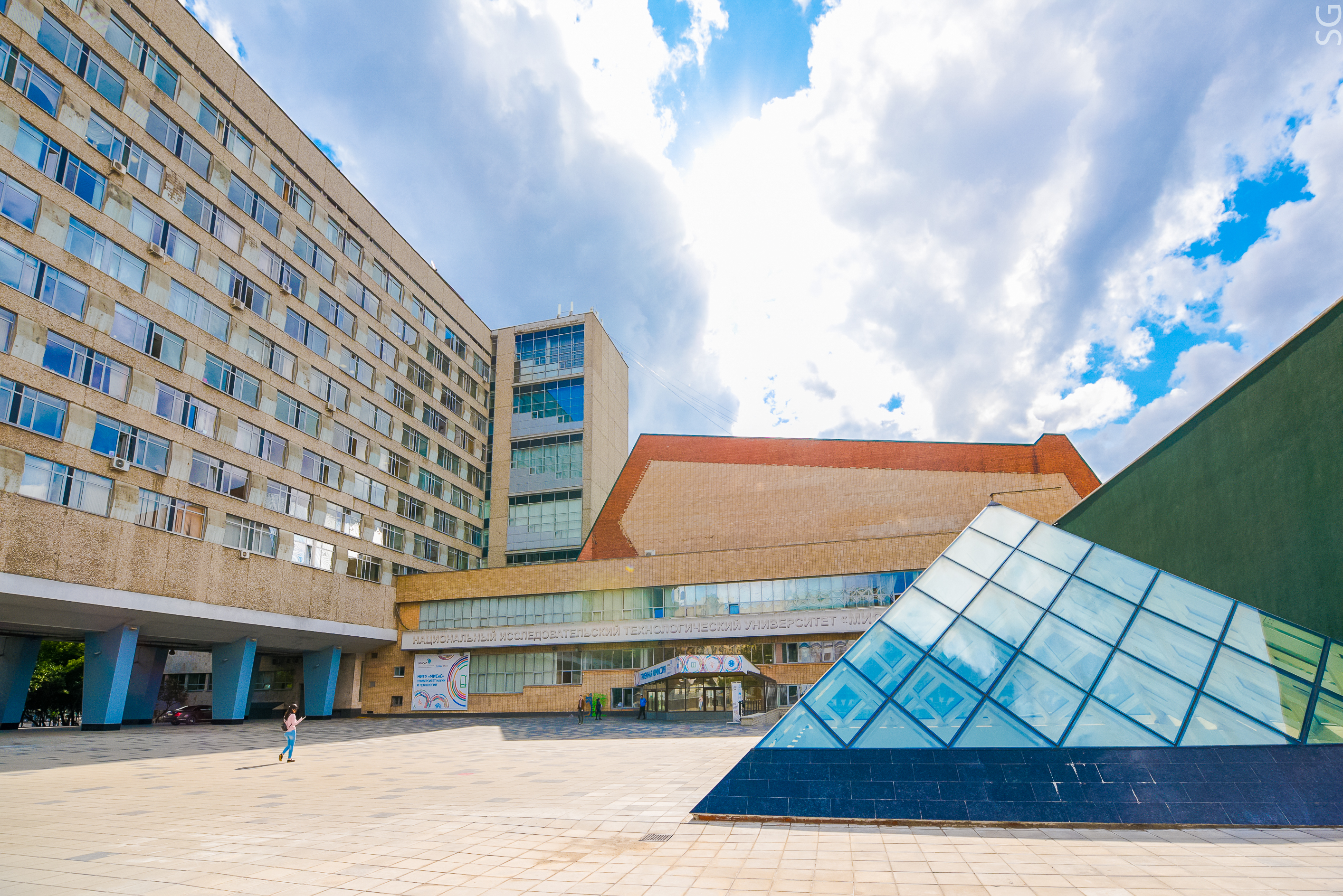
- Established: 1918
- President: Yuri S. Karabasov
- Rector: Alevtina Chernikova
- Location: Moscow, Russia; 55°43′39″N 37°36′27″E
- Website: http://en.misis.ru
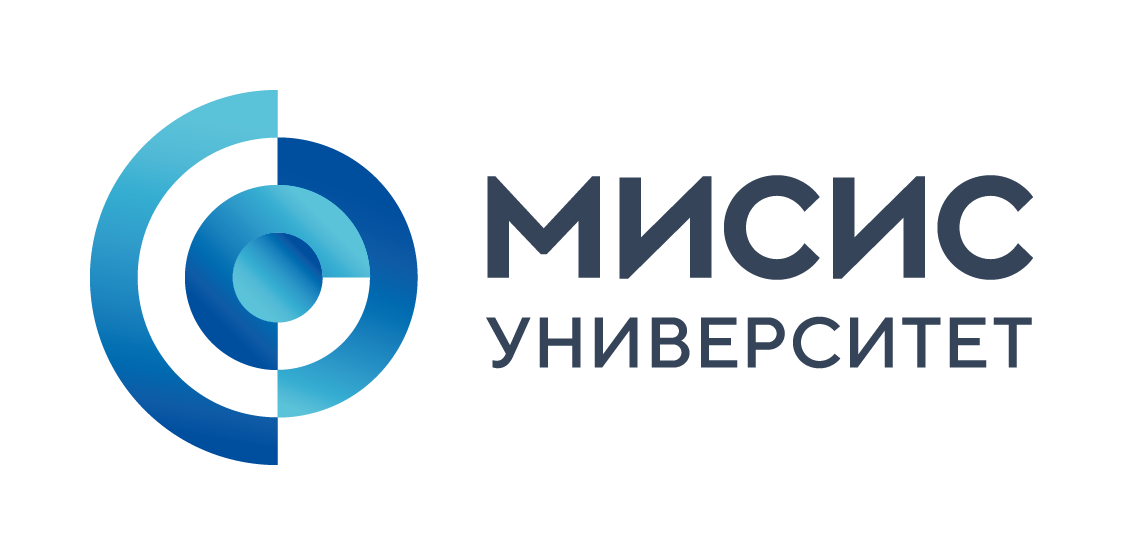

University rankings

Global – Overall
- USNWR Global: 1,017 (2023)

Regional – Overall
- QS Emerging Europe and Central Asia: 48 (2022)

The National University of Science and Technology MISIS (NUST MISIS) (Russian: Национальный исследовательский технологический университет МИСИС) is a public technological university in the field of steelmaking and metallurgy, based in Moscow, Russia. NUST MISIS traces its history to the Moscow Mining Academy, founded in 1918. In 1930, the Academy was divided into several independent institutes, one of which became the Moscow Institute of Steel, later named after J. V. Stalin. In 1962, after merging with the Moscow Institute of Non-Ferrous Metals and Gold, it was renamed the Moscow Institute of Steel and Alloys. In 2014, the Moscow State Mining University joined MISIS, making the university the legal successor of the Moscow Mining Academy. The status of technological university was awarded in 1993 and the status of a National University in 2008, when the institution adopted its current name. It was ranked the # 1,017 university in the world in 2023.

MISIS is a member of the Higher Metallurgical Education Association, whose members include universities from Russia, Ukraine, and Kazakhstan. It had joint degree programmes with the Freiberg University of Mining and Technology in Freiberg, Germany, and the Institut National Polytechnique de Lorraine in Nancy, France.

== Institutes ==
- Institute of Metallurgy, Ecology and Quality
- Institute of Physical Chemistry of Materials
- Institute of Materials Technology
- Institute of Mining
- Institute of Computer Science and Economics
- Institute of Humanities
- Institute of Information Business Systems
- Faculty of Part-Time Education
- Post Higher Education Centre
- Preparatory Faculty
- Mining

== Notable alumni ==
- Avraamy Pavlovich Zavenyagin (1901–1956) was a Soviet statesman, industrial organizer, metallurgical engineer, and supervisor of Soviet metallurgy and the atomic project. He held the rank of Lieutenant General (1945, MVD). From 1923 to 1930, he studied at what was then called the Moscow Mining Academy.
- Petr Poluhin (1911—1996), Hero of Socialist Labour (1971), Honoured Worker of Science and Technology of the RSFSR, USSR State Prize laureate, Doctor of Technical Sciences, Professor. Rector of the Moscow Institute of Steel and Alloys from 1965 to 1986.
- Ivan F. Tevosyan (1902–1958), Soviet statesman and Communist Party official, Hero of Socialist Labour (1943).
- Viktor Berkovsky, Soviet and Ukrainian bard
- Mikhail Fridman, Ukrainian-born Russian–Israeli businessman, billionaire, and oligarch
- German Khan, Ukrainian-Russian businessman, billionaire, and oligarch
- Eduard Shifrin, Ukrainian entrepreneur and co-owner of the Midland Group
- Vladimir Solovyov, Russian TV presenter and propagandist

MISIS has about 16,500 undergraduate, graduate, and doctoral students, and a faculty of about 1200, including 326 professors and 350 associate professors.
