= Humphrey Gainsborough =

British engineer and minister

The Reverend Humphrey Gainsborough
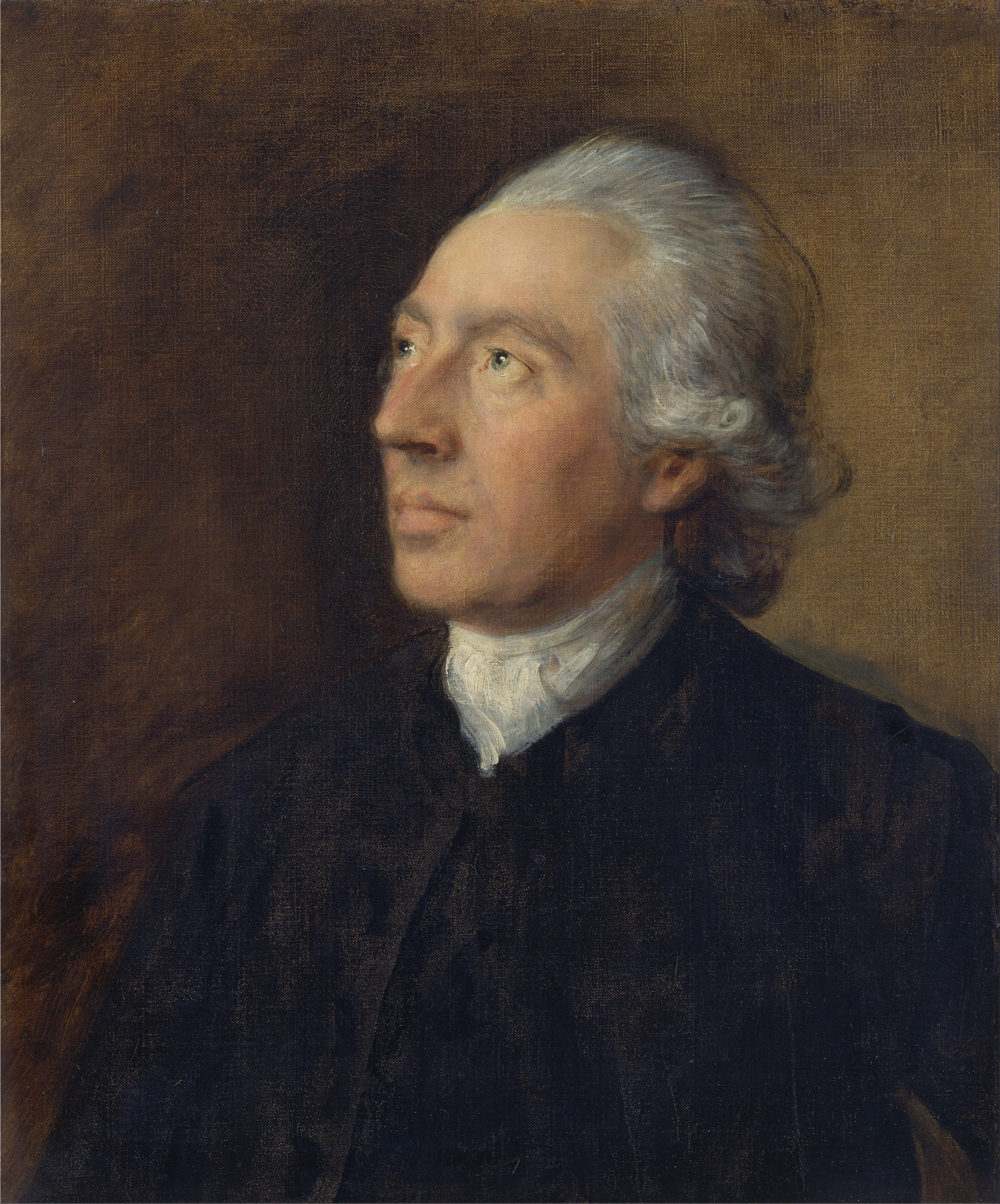
- The Rev. Humphrey Gainsborough by Thomas Gainsborough (his brother), painted 1770–4
- Born: 1718; England
- Died: 23 August 1776; England
- Engineering career
- Discipline: Civil engineer; Mechanical engineer; Structural engineer
- Projects: Conway's Bridge; Marsh Lock
- Significant design: Door chain; Drill plough; Steam engine; Tide mill

Humphrey Gainsborough (1718 – 23 August 1776) was an English non-conformist minister, engineer, and inventor.

Humphrey Gainsborough was pastor to the Independent Church in Henley-on-Thames, England. He was the brother of the artist Thomas Gainsborough. He invented the drill plough (1766), winning a prize of £60 from the Royal Society for his efforts. He also invented the tide mill (1761), which allowed a mill wheel to rotate in either direction, winning a £50 prize from the Society for the Encouragement of Arts in London. In addition, he designed a self-ventilating fish wagon (1762).

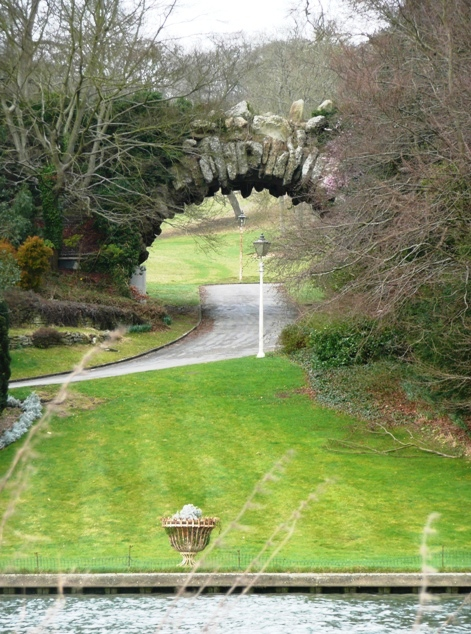
Conway's Bridge, designed by Humphrey Gainsborough and built in 1763 at Park Place, named after Henry Seymour Conway (1721–1795)

Gainsborough designed Conway's Bridge, built in 1763 at Park Place close to Henley, an interesting rustic arched stone structure that still carries traffic on the road between Wargrave and Henley today. In 1768, he improved the slope on the road up the steep White Hill to the east of Henley, straightening it in the process.

James Watt perhaps included some of – and at least built on – Gainsborough's ideas on his steam engine. Watt had been working independently on improvements to the Newcomen "atmospheric engine" and subsequently patented these in 1769. Gainsborough is thus probably less well-known than he might have been.

The lock, weir and footbridge at Marsh Lock, just upstream from Henley on the River Thames, were designed by Gainsborough, together with other early locks from Sonning to Maidenhead (1772–73).

A blue plaque in Gainsborough's honour can be found in the town of Henley itself on the gates of the Manse, the house where he lived next to the Christ Church United Reformed Church. Inside he designed an early security chain and plate on one of the outside doors, allowing the door to be partially opened, that is still there now. Similar designs are used on many people's front doors today.

== Epitaph ==
Philip Thicknesse wrote in The Gentleman's Magazine in 1785:

… one of the most ingenious men that ever lived, and one of the best that ever died … Perhaps of all the mechanical geniuses this or any nation has produced. Mr Gainsborough was the first.

== Bibliography ==
- Boston, Philippa. "Opening Pandora's box". www.thisislimitededition.co.uk. UK: Oxfordshire Limited Edition. Archived from the original on 8 November 2005.
- Kendal, Roger; Bowen, Jane; Wortley, Laura (2002). The Reverend Humphrey Gainsborough. UK: River and Rowing Museum. pp. 20–31.
