= Royal Connaught Hotel =

Hotel in Hamilton, Ontario

Coordinates: 43.255348°N 79.866013°W

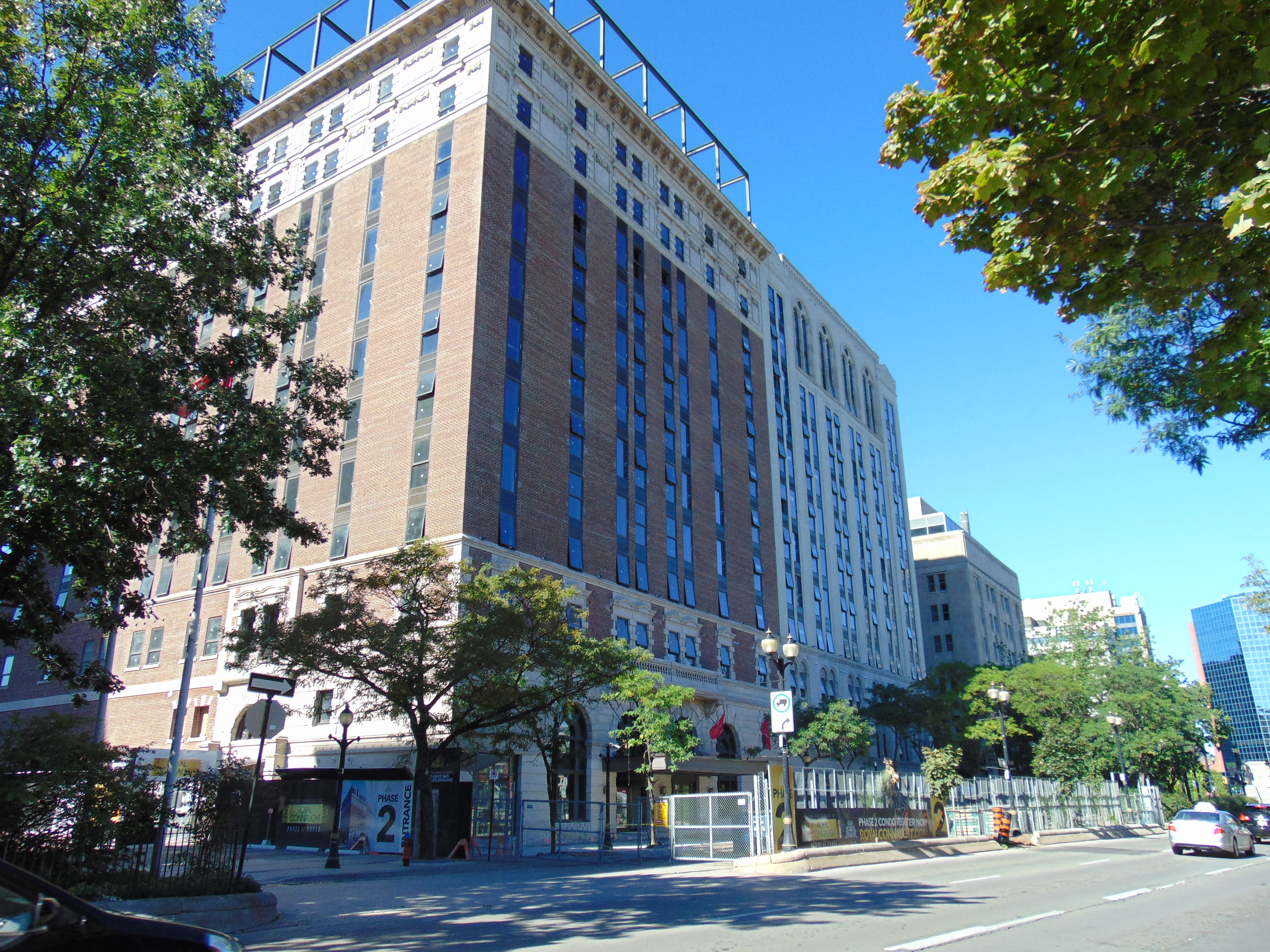

General information
- Location: 118 King Street East, Hamilton, Ontario
- Opened: 5 June 1916

Technical details
- Floor count: 12

Design and construction
- Architecture firm: Esenwein & Johnson; A. W. Peene
- Main contractor: Pigott Construction

Other information
- Number of rooms: 244

The Royal Connaught Hotel is a 12-storey building in downtown Hamilton, Ontario. It was built by Harry Frost of Buffalo, New York in 1914, who also started up and owned the Frost Fence Company in Hamilton. It is located at the corner of King Street East and John Street South. From 2014-2018, it was converted to condominiums.

== Timeline ==
- 1911 - Businessman Harry Louis Frost approaches the city about building a grand hotel.
- 1914 - A building permit is issued for construction on the site of the Waldorf Hotel.
- 1916 - The hotel opens with a lavish banquet and dance on 5 June.
- 1922 - Prior to the 1922-23 season, the National Hockey League (NHL) would hold its Governors meeting at the Royal Connaught Hotel on King Street, where the visiting NHL teams who came to town to play against the Hamilton Tigers stayed as well.
- 1927- In 1927, CKOC radio station was finding the Lister Building accommodations unsatisfactory and the radio station was moved to the 11th floor of the Royal Connaught Hotel. The transmitter power was raised from 50 to 100 watts. For a brief time, CKOC and CHML shared the same frequency... 880 on the radio dial. In 1931, CKOC changed to the 630 on the dial and boosted power to a full 1,000 watts. The radio business was beginning to boom!
- 1929- The hotel expands into a neighbouring building.
- 1930 - The hotel serves as the site of female athlete accommodation for the 1930 British Empire Games.
- 1930- United Hotels Company, which owned the Connaught, announces it has been sold. The new owner adds 200 rooms and turns the bottom floors into offices and shops. The extension of the Hotel was constructed by W.H Yates Construction Co. Ltd.
- 1952- The hotel is sold to the Sheraton chain, which renames it The Sheraton-Connaught Hotel and later completes a million-dollar renovation.
- 1973- The hotel is again sold, this time to Toronto-based Citicom. Another renovation worth $4 million is completed.
- 1988- The hotel is sold to Joymarmon Properties Ltd.
- 1992- Joymarmon loses the hotel when its mortgage holder forecloses.
- 1993- The hotel becomes a franchise under the Howard Johnson chain.
- 2002- Canmac Hotels Corporation, a master at reviving struggling hotels, buys the hotel, assumes its $6-million debt and promises full-scale renovations.
- 2004- Hotel closes after going into receivership.
- 2005- Local businessmen buy the hotel for $4.5 million.
- 2008- Real Estate developer Harry Stinson makes a deposit with plans to reopen it for Christmas 2009.
- 2008- June 2, 2008, Harry Stinson makes a public presentation of his proposed 100-storey Connaught Towers at the Hamilton Chamber of Commerce building. Once complete, it will become the tallest building in Canada. Three months later, on Thursday September 4, Harry Stinson closes up the Connaught Towers sales office in downtown Hamilton and the project is officially cancelled.
- 2014- June 2014, Two of the largest builders in the Hamilton area, Spallacci Group and Valery Homes, teamed up to renovate the hotel, and after months of renovation, the front lobby was given a complete restoration, and sample units for The Residences of Royal Connaught were made available to the public to purchase.

== Harry Stinson & The Connaught Towers ==
On 29 February 2008 Harry Stinson inked a $9.5-million contract to purchase the Royal Connaught Hotel at Hamilton, Ontario. The agreement was secured with a $100,000 deposit and provided a 30-day conditional period for Stinson to secure financing. But financing was not secured. The concept included restoration and a substantial addition to the existing Connaught building to include a 100-room boutique luxury hotel and approximately 200 compact one- and two-bedroom multi-use condominium units. Stinson's original grand vision included a 70- to 80-storey Sapphire Tower and has now turned into a new 100-storey condominium tower, with a commercial gallery designed to be an architectural signature piece for downtown Hamilton. The price tag for the entire project was an estimated $300-million, but the project was never initiated and Stinson soon set his sights on other projects IJNR took over.

== See also ==
- List of tallest buildings in Hamilton, Ontario
- Harry Stinson
- Sapphire Tower
