= The St. Regis Toronto =

Luxury hotel in Toronto

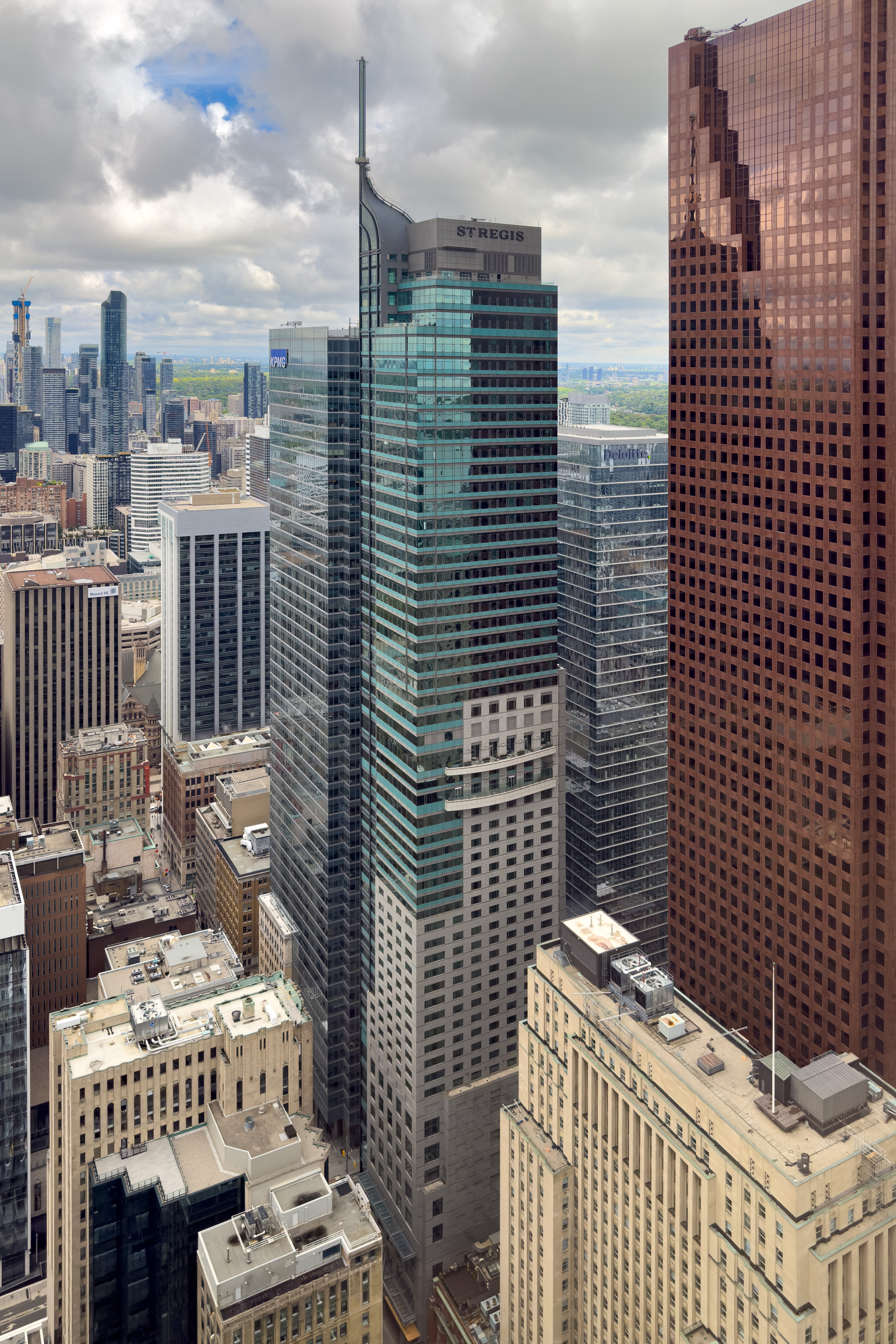
- The St. Regis Toronto (centre, with spire)
- Former names: Trump International Hotel and Tower Toronto (2012–17); The Adelaide Hotel Toronto (2017–18)
- Hotel chain: St. Regis Hotels & Resorts

General information
- Status: Completed
- Type: Residential, hotel, retail
- Architectural style: Postmodern
- Location: 325 Bay Street; Toronto, Ontario; M5H 4G3
- Coordinates: 43°38′59″N 79°22′49″W
- Construction started: October 2007
- Opening: Soft: January 31, 2012; Grand: April 16, 2012
- Owner: InnVest Hotels LP
- Operator: Marriott International

Height
- Antenna spire: 276.9 m (908 ft)
- Roof: 236.5 m (776 ft)

Technical details
- Floor count: 57
- Floor area: 74,510 m^{2} (802,000 sq ft)

Design and construction
- Architect: Zeidler Partnership Architects
- Developer: Talon International Development Inc.

Website
- stregistoronto.com

The St. Regis Toronto is a mixed-use skyscraper located in the downtown core of Toronto, Ontario, Canada. It was built by Markham-based Talon International Development Inc., which is owned by Canadian businessmen Val Levitan and Alex Shnaider. The hotel portion of the building is owned by InnVest Hotels LP, which acquired it in 2017.

The building is located in Toronto's Financial District, at 325 Bay Street, on the southeast corner of Bay and Adelaide streets. Including the spire, it is the second-tallest building in Canada, the second tallest-building in Toronto, and the tallest mixed-use building in Toronto. Including non-building structures (such as CN Tower) and when measured to the tip (antenna), it is the fourth-tallest structure in Toronto, as of 2020.

The building opened in 2012 as the Trump International Hotel and Tower Toronto. The Trump family-owned Trump Organization held the management contract for the hotel and was a minority shareholder in the project. This affiliation with Donald Trump – then a real estate developer and reality-television star, later President of the United States – was controversial, and led to public calls to drop the building's Trump branding.

The management contract was bought out by JCF Capital in June 2017, and the hotel portion of the building was then purchased by InnVest Hotels LP, a subsidiary of Bluesky Hotels and Resorts. The hotel management shifted to Marriott International, which operated it on an unbranded basis as The Adelaide Hotel Toronto during renovations. After the renovations were completed, the hotel became part of Marriott's St. Regis Hotels & Resorts on 28 November 2018, adopting its present name.

== Specifications ==
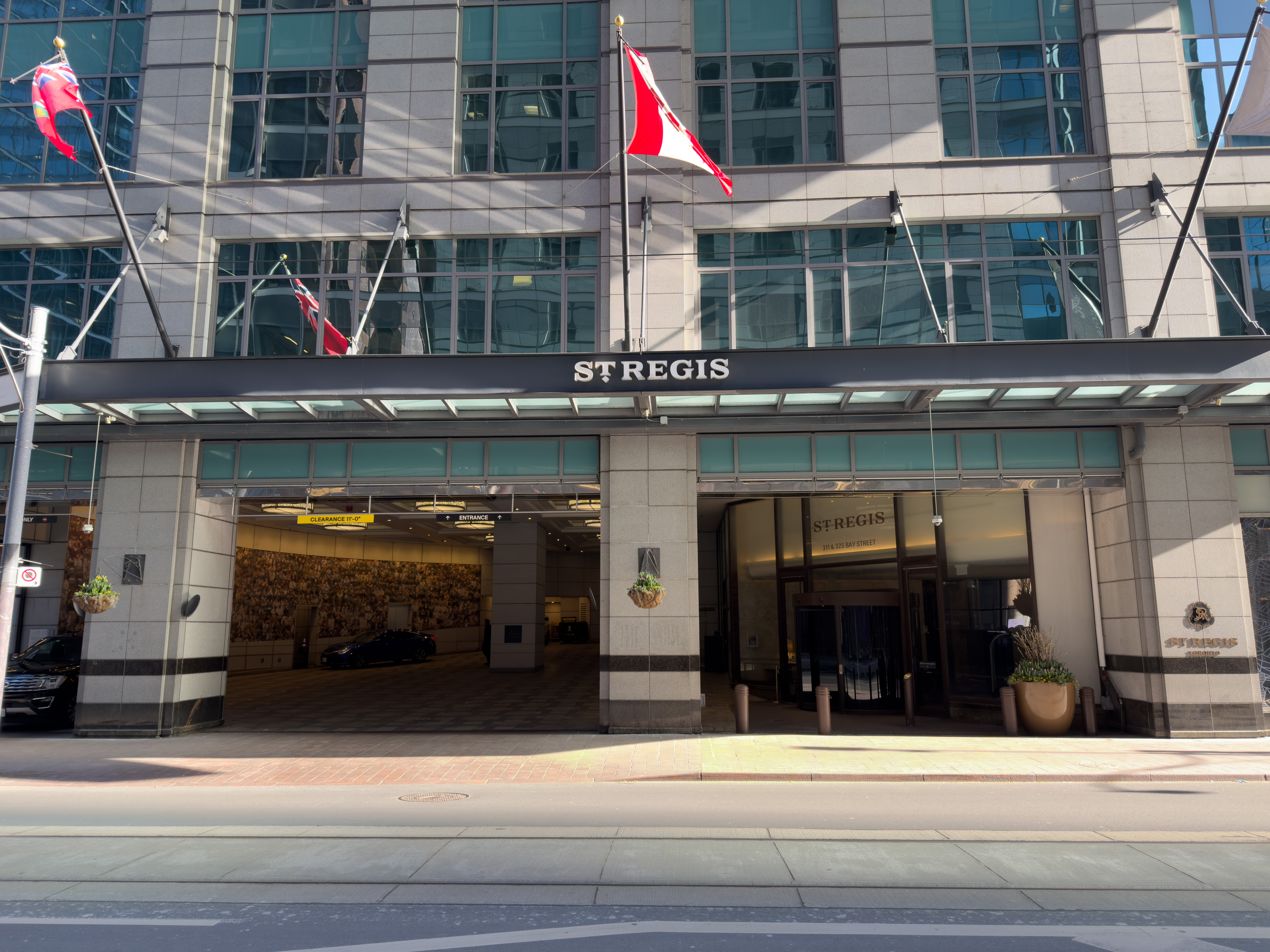
Main entrance on Adelaide Street

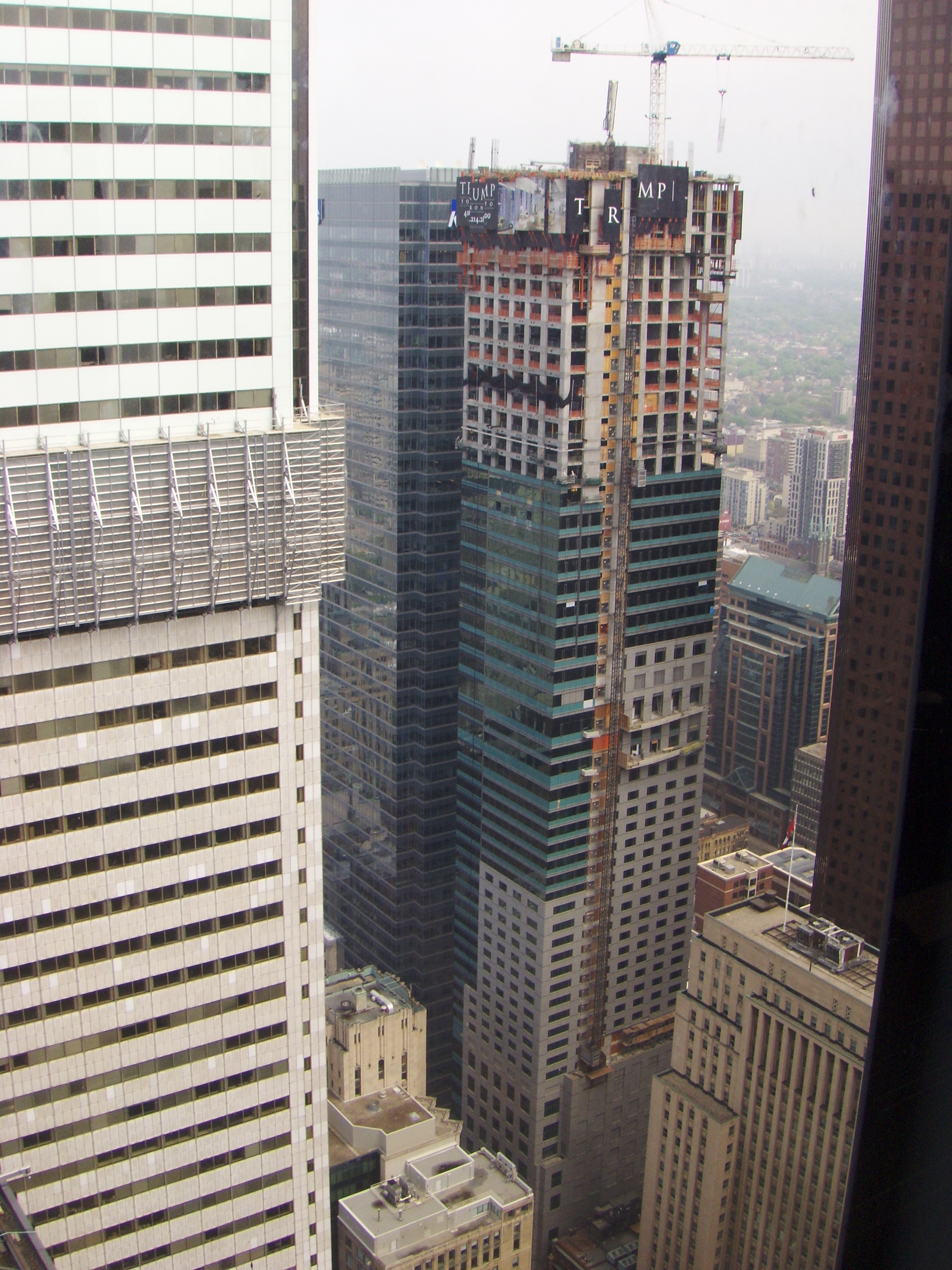
The building under construction in May 2011.

The tower has 65 stories, 57 occupiable floors, is 276.9 m (908 ft) tall, and is clad with a steel, glass, and stone facade. The building includes 261 luxury hotel rooms and 118 residential condominium suites. The top two floors of the hotel section house a 5,486 m^{2} (59,050 sq ft) spa. The tower was designed by Zeidler Partnership Architects and is the tallest mixed-use building in Canada. The hotel occupies floors 2-31, while floors 32-57 are occupied by condominium suites.

Residential suites range in size from 207 m^{2} (2,230 sq ft), and were designed with upscale fixtures and 3.4 to 4 m (11 to 13 ft) ceilings. Suite prices started at CA$1.2 million. There are 4-6 suites per floor. Residents have a separate entrance and elevators from hotel guests.

Builders planned to connect the building to Toronto's underground PATH network, however this plan was dropped because of the high costs associated with tunnelling under the city.

== History ==
=== Rivalry with Sapphire Tower ===
Developer Harry Stinson intended to create a friendly rivalry with Trump for the tallest mixed-use building in Canada with the Sapphire Tower. As a result, the planned heights of both projects were revised several times in an attempt to outdo each other, and Stinson's skyscraper would have been 17 metres taller in its last design. However, the Sapphire Tower failed to gain approval of city council, in part because it would have cast a shadow over Toronto City Hall's Nathan Phillips Square, and its development company filed for bankruptcy in 2007. At that time, the Trump Tower's design was also scaled back and the height was reduced because of the real estate market slowdown.

=== Construction ===
The building was built on a previously vacant lot, used only for parking, between Scotia Plaza and The National Club. Lewis Builds Corporation, a construction and development manager in downtown Toronto, was the construction manager for this project.

On March 23, 2007, Talon International Development Incorporated of Markham announced that it had reached an agreement with international bank Raiffeisen Zentralbank Österreich AG (RZB) to arrange CA$310 million in construction financing for its Trump International Hotel & Tower development.

Construction began with the removal of the sales centre in September 2007. The official groundbreaking was on October 12, 2007. The hotel portion of the tower was planned to be completed in late 2011. The tower was projected to be completed in early 2012. The building topped out in early September 2011, and the spire was raised on September 24, 2011. The hotel opened for business on January 31, 2012, and its grand opening occurred on April 16, 2012. Work on the top of the building continued until completion in July 2012 with the activation of two high-intensity aircraft warning lights.

== Issues and controversies ==
=== Investor disputes ===
In May 2017, The Wall Street Journal reported that Russian state-owned Vnesheconombank (VEB) provided financing for the construction of the hotel in 2010. According to the Panama Papers, in 2010, Shnaider sold at least half of Midland Group's ownership in the Zaporizhstal steel mill to buyers financed by VEB, who were then themselves acquired by the bank. Shnaider then used proceeds from the sale to partially meet cost overruns at the Tower. Shnaider's lawyer told The Wall Street Journal that $15 million from the sale to the Russian bank went into the tower, and then recanted.

The tower has been controversial since its opening because of lower than expected occupancy rates in the "hotel-condo" portion of the building that led to a legal battle between real estate investors and Talon International Development. As of October 2016, the following units (not including parking spaces) had been sold to investors:

Ownership of the Tower's residential units (October 2016)
Owner	Hotel units	Residential units
Talon	211	74
Other investors	50	44
Total	261	118

Investors wanted to opt out of purchase agreements because they believe the sales tactics used by Talon regarding financial projections were misleading. The Ontario Securities Commission investigated the matter in 2012 and decided not to take action, but several investors sued Talon, its principals and Trump for various claims, including recovery of their deposits, damages for loss of opportunity and consequential damages, negligent misrepresentation and conspiracy. Talon counter-sued the investors who did not pay the remaining purchase price by December 13, 2012. In July 2015, the Ontario Superior Court of Justice dismissed two test cases, while finding that income estimates for the project were "hypothetical" in nature, but the judgment was partially overturned in October 2016 at the Ontario Court of Appeal, which held that:

1. an agreement that had not closed could be rescinded
2. for an agreement that had closed, damages against Talon for negligent misrepresentation were available
3. Trump, together with two of Talon's principals, could still be sued for other claims that had been improperly dismissed, including oppression, collusion and breach of fiduciary duties.
4. a claim for fraudulent misrepresentation was remitted back to the Superior Court for determination

In 2017, the Supreme Court of Canada rejected the defendants' appeal from the ruling against them by the Ontario Court of Appeal.

=== Unfinished state ===
In August 2013, close to six years after the start of construction, the building was incomplete. The "TRUMP" sign on the north side of the tower read "TRUM", and the public art feature Lightline was missing. The tower's spokesman, Dorenda McNeil, told media in May 2013 that "from our perspective, the building is not yet fully complete. We will turn it [the public art feature] on at the right opportunity". Because the light feature is a public art piece promised as part of the approval process for development, the City of Toronto grew impatient and considered commencing litigation.

=== Default by developer ===
In October 2016, JCF Capital ULC (a private firm that had bought the construction loan on the building) announced that it was seeking court approval under the Bankruptcy and Insolvency Act to have the building sold in order to recoup its debt, which then totalled $301 million.

The Ontario Superior Court of Justice approved the request to appoint a receiver on November 4, 2016. The court allowed for its auction which took place in March 2017, but no bidders took part, other than one stalking horse offer.

=== Name issues ===
In December 2015, Josh Matlow, Toronto City Councillor for Ward 22, created a petition to rename the building, due to the controversial remarks made by Trump during the early phases of his presidential campaign. Matlow stated that renaming the building would allow Talon International Development to disassociate itself, and by extension, for Toronto to disassociate itself, from Trump and his remarks. Following Trump's election, the site became the subject of protests against Trump, despite the fact that it was only branded with the Trump name under licence due to a management deal, and was not otherwise owned by him.

In March 2017, JCF Capital ULC (a joint venture between Juniper Capital Partners and Cowie Capital Partners) acquired the building, including 211 hotel units, 74 condo units and most of the commercial, retail and amenity space, for $298 million. On June 27, 2017, JCF Capital reached an agreement to buy out the Trump Organization's management contract for the property, meaning that the hotel would drop the Trump branding. Bloomberg reported that the property was likely to be rebranded under Marriott International's St. Regis banner.

On June 29, 2017, InnVest Hotels LP (a Toronto-based subsidiary of Bluesky Hotels and Resorts Inc., a Canadian private company backed by Hong Kong capital) acquired the hotel from JCF Capital for an undisclosed amount and announced that the 65-storey facility would receive a significant renovation and be renamed The St. Regis Toronto once the initial phases of the renovation were complete. Prior to the renovation and rebranding to St. Regis, Marriott International operated the property as The Adelaide Hotel Toronto on an unbranded basis.

=== Russian government connections ===
The building and Shnaider have been named as key links in a financial connection between U.S. President Trump and the Russian government. According to some people who knew the transaction in 2017, a Russian-Canadian developer named Alexander Shnaider, who also one of the Trump's partners financed the hotel for its development after selling his company's share in a Ukrainian steelmaker for $850 million. The buyer, who financed by Vnesheconombank (VEB), have been described as "an entity acting for the Russian government." Trump quickly denied it and stated in February 2017 that there is "no person that I deal with [has dealings with Russia]."

== See also ==
- Hotels in Toronto
- List of tallest buildings in Canada
- List of tallest buildings in Toronto
- List of tallest structures in Canada
- Trump International Hotel and Tower
