= Harry Stinson (real estate developer) =

Canadian real estate developer

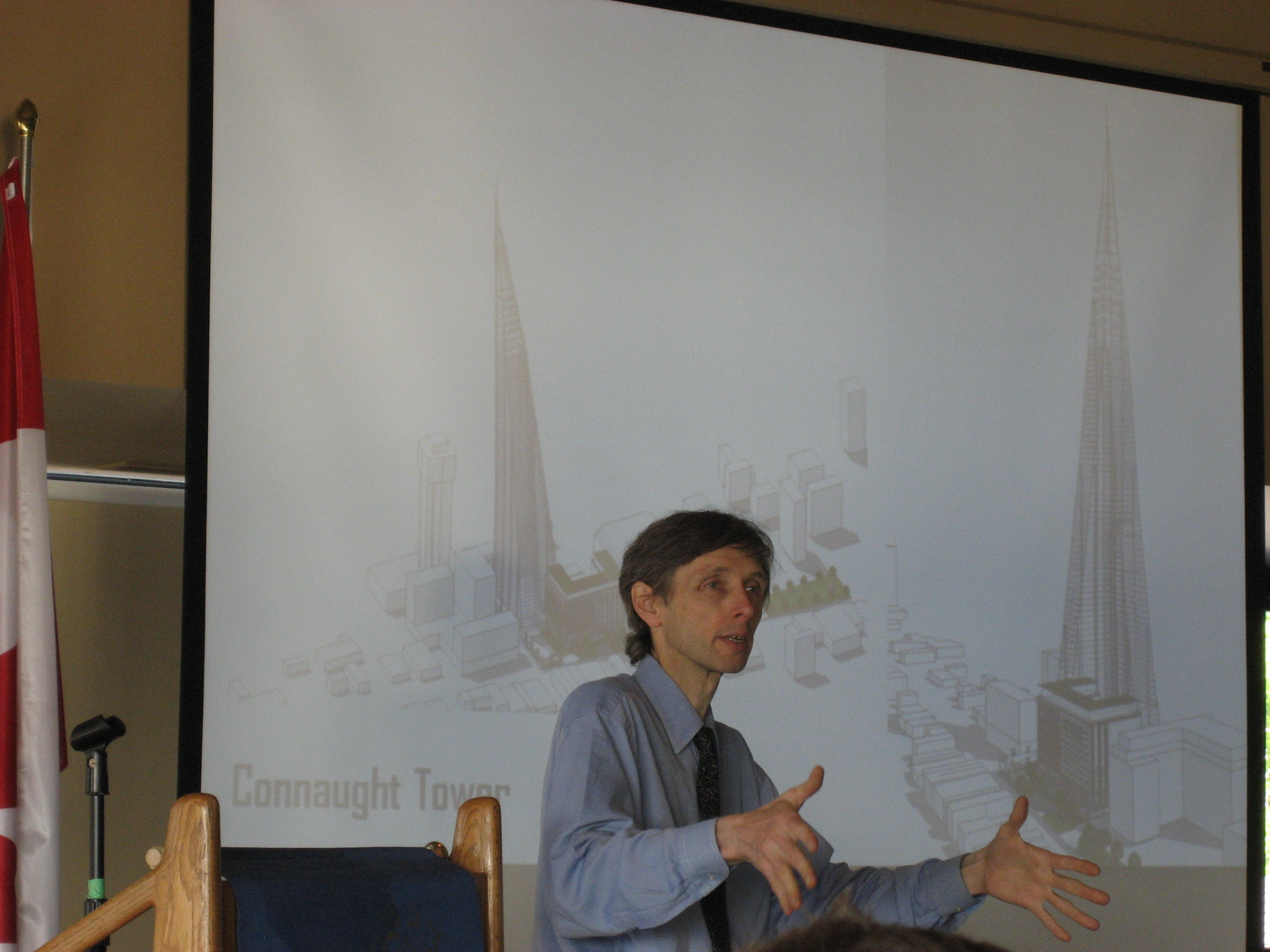
- Harry Stinson in 2008
- Born: June 3, 1953 (age 73); Toronto, Ontario, Canada
- Education: University of Toronto
- Occupation: Real estate developer
- Years active: 1982–present
- Website: stinsonproperties.com

Harry Stinson (born June 3, 1953 in Toronto, Ontario) is a Canadian real estate developer from Hamilton, Ontario, Canada. He is president of Stinson Properties, Inc. He has been called Toronto's "condo king".

== Biography ==
Prior to his pursuit as a developer, Harry Stinson ran a party venue in Toronto, Canada, called The Mad Hatter—a place for children's parties in the 1980s. The business has since ceased operation.

Stinson's most significant project to date has been 1 King West, a condo/hotel tower that he claimed to be the "narrowest building in the world" on the basis of its height-to-footprint ratio. It incorporates the former headquarters of the Dominion Bank.

He was promoting the Sapphire Tower, a new residential tower for Toronto's financial district that would have been the tallest residential tower in Toronto at 342 metres (90 storeys). He was competing with Trump International Hotel and Tower, a condo/hotel of similar height. In early 2008 the Sapphire Tower site was sold for three times its initial price for $24m.

His Dominion Club was closed on September 20, 2006 and sold to the 1 King West Condo Corporation along with the hotel management contract for $14 million. In March 2007, Stinson filed for creditor protection as a result of an $11.8 million dispute with David Mirvish, the financier of 1 King West. On April 20, 2007, Stinson and Mirvish went to Ontario Superior Court where Mr. Justice Colin Campbell issued an order granting Mr. Stinson permission to continue running One King, but appointed Ira Smith Trustee & Receiver Inc. as monitor, with full access to all records of Mr. Stinson’s businesses. On August 24, 2007, Ira Smith Trustee & Receiver Inc. was appointed Receiver and Manager over the assets, properties and undertakings of several of Mr. Stinson's companies, pursuant to the order of the Honourable Madam Justice Pepall.

In late 2009 the legal battles continued between Stinson and Mirvish.

On February 29, 2008, Stinson signed a $9.5-million contract to purchase the Royal Connaught Hotel at Hamilton. The agreement was secured with a $100,000 deposit and provided a 30-day conditional period for Stinson to secure financing. The concept included restoration and a substantial addition to the existing Connaught building to include a 100-room boutique luxury hotel and approximately 200 compact one- and two-bedroom multi-use condominiums. Stinson confirmed a 100-storey condominium tower with a commercial gallery designed to be an architectural signature piece for downtown Hamilton. Stinson now resides in the city of Hamilton.

On June 2, 2008, Stinson made a public presentation of his proposed 100-storey Connaught Towers at the Hamilton Chamber of Commerce building. It would have made it the tallest building in Canada. Three months later, on Thursday September 4, Stinson closed the Connaught Towers sales office in downtown Hamilton and the project was cancelled. In April 2009, Stinson moved the location of his proposed Hamilton Grand Hotel from John St. beside the Royal Connaught Hotel to the southeast corner of John and Main streets in Hamilton. The hotel is to look like a 19th-century building and will operate as a condominium owned hotel with street level retail, restaurant and banquet centre.

On June 30, 2009, Stinson bought the Stinson School at 200 Stinson Street for $1.05 million with plans to turn the former school into loft condominiums. On December 23, 2013, the Stinson School Lofts held an open house and Christmas reception in its grand lobby that was attended by approximately 1,000 people including the mayor of Hamilton Bob Bratina. At this party, Stinson also announced his latest historical school development project in Hamilton where he plans to convert Gibson Public School into small condos.

On March 9, 2022, the Ontario Securities Commission (OSC) accused Harry Stinson of violating provincial securities law by allegedly misleading investors who gave him $19 million for the Buffalo Grand Hotel in New York and using the money for other projects.

Harry Stinson, who moved to Hamilton in 2008, said he disagrees with the allegations, but wouldn't dispute the claims publicly.

His final appeal of the fine was dismissed in October 2025. He was sanctioned with a $600,000 Ontario Securities Commission penalty.

On October 24, 2025, Joey Coleman of The Public Record wrote: "Arriving in Hamilton in 2007, Stinson pitched a 100-storey tower addition to the Royal Connaught Hotel in early 2008. The project went nowhere. Other projects followed and failed to proceed. Finally, Stinson completed the conversion of the former Stinson Street School into condos, with the building opening in December 2013."

== Projects ==
Stinson's projects include:

- The Mad Hatter (no longer in operation)
- 1 King West (completed)
- High Park Lofts (completed)
- The Candy Factory (completed)
- Sapphire Tower (CANCELLED, sold for $24 million in early 2008)
- The Connaught Towers (CANCELLED 100-storey tower for downtown Hamilton, Ontario)
- The Hamilton Grand (CANCELLED)
- Stinson School Lofts (Completed)
- Gibson School Lofts (CANCELLED. Property in receivership.)
- The Hammer Lofts (CANCELLED)
- Beasley Park lofts (DELAYED. Construction start date delayed several times.)
- The Buffalo Grand (INCOMPLETE. Ontario Securities Commission investigating Harry Stinson for various violations.)

== Images ==
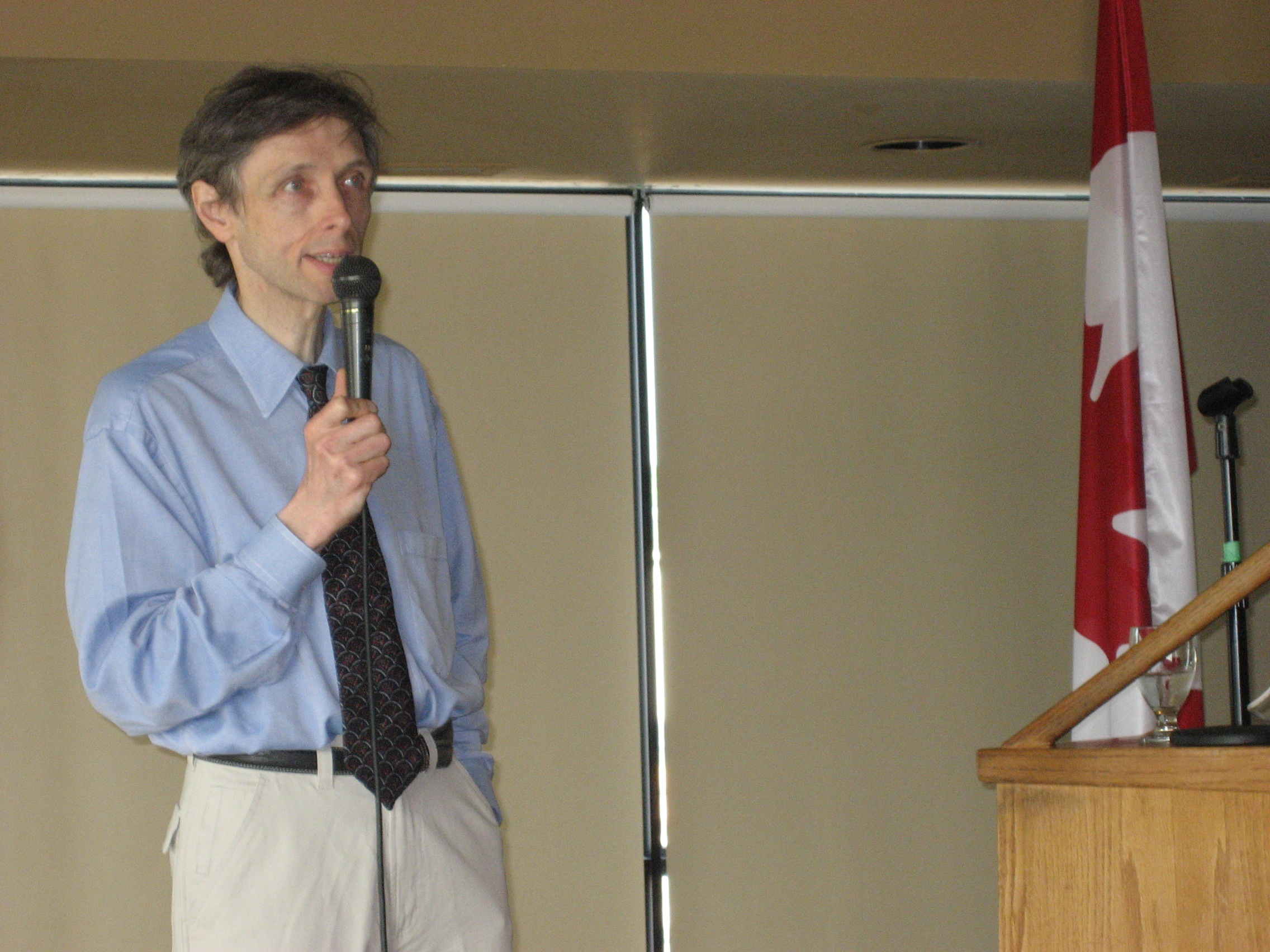
Harry Stinson, Hamilton Chamber of Commerce

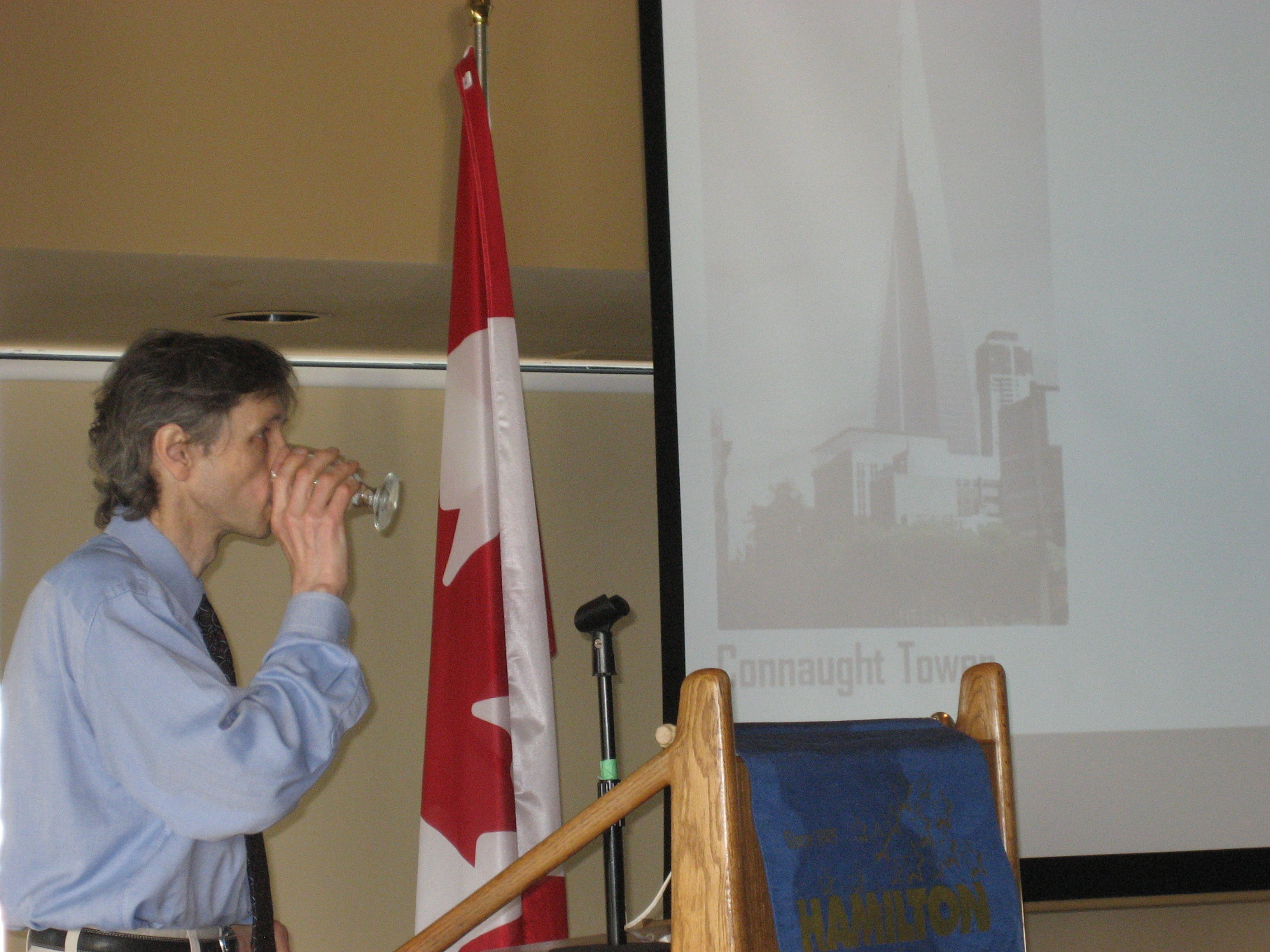
Harry Stinson, Hamilton Chamber of Commerce
