= Park Place, Berkshire =

Coordinates: 51.5328°N 0.8812°W

Park Place
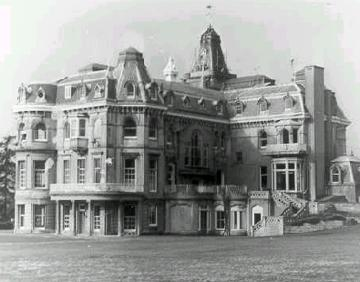
- Park Place, Berkshire

General information
- Type: Residential
- Location: Berkshire, United Kingdom
- Completed: 2011
- Owner: Andrey Borodin

Technical details
- Floor area: 55,446 sq. ft

Park Place is a historic Grade II Listed country house and gardens in the civil parish of Remenham in Berkshire, England, set in large grounds above the River Thames near Henley, Oxfordshire.

== History ==
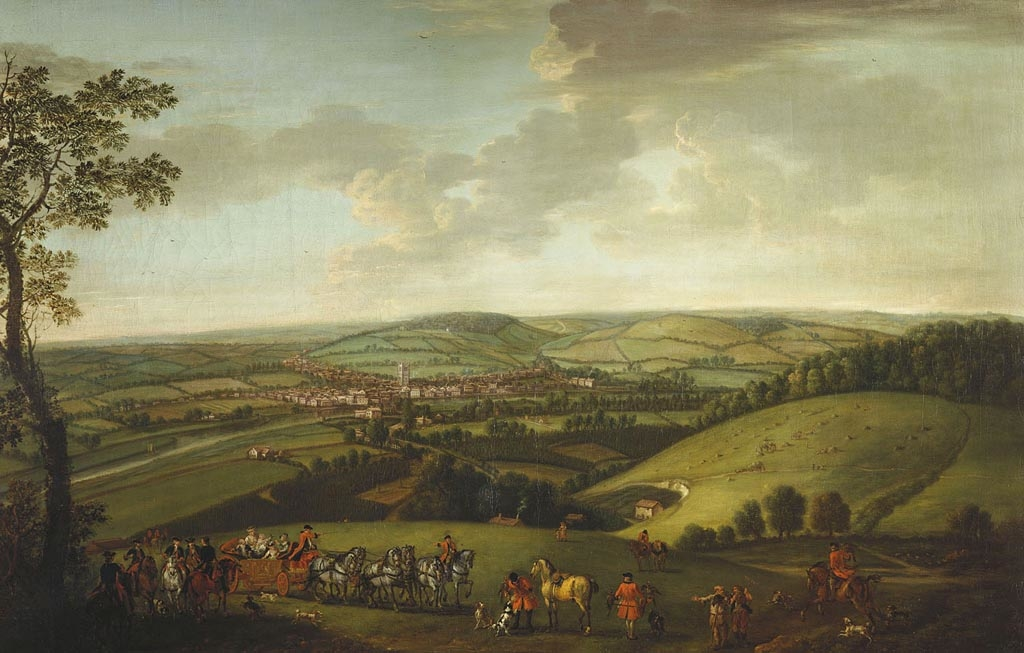
A View of Henley-on-Thames by John Wootton, 1743. Depicting the view from Park Place towards Henley.

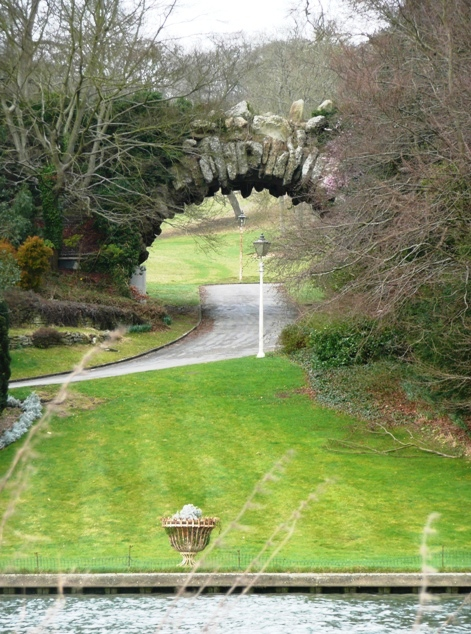
Conway's Bridge

Lord Archibald Hamilton bought the estate in 1719 from Mrs Elizabeth Baker and built a new villa on the site. Frederick, Prince of Wales (father of King George III) bought the house from Lord Archibald in 1738.

The estate was purchased by Henry Seymour Conway in 1752 and he made extensive improvements. Humphrey Gainsborough, brother of the artist Thomas Gainsborough, designed Conway's Bridge, built in 1763 at Park Place. The rustic arched stone structure close to the River Thames was built with stone taken from the ruins of Reading Abbey and still carries traffic on the road between Wargrave and Henley-on-Thames.

Henry Hawkins Tremayne visited Park Place in 1785 whilst touring various gardens in southern England. He enthused about the garden, being especially impressed by its subterranean passages, menagerie, temples and "Rustick" bridge. These provided inspiration for his own new garden, now better known as the Lost Gardens of Heligan.

In 1797, following the death of Conway, the estate was bought by James Harris, 1st Earl of Malmesbury, who auctioned the estate in 1816, with the main lot (mansion & park) being purchased by Henry Piper Sperling. In 1824, Henry Sperling exchanged the estate for Norbury Park, Surrey, with his cousin Ebenezer Fuller Maitland of Shinfield Park, Berkshire. He erected The Obelisk in memory of Queen Victoria's accession, also known as the Victoria memorial – originally the late 17th-century spire of St. Bride's, Fleet Street, designed by Christopher Wren.

Ebenezer Fuller Maitland died in 1858, at which point Queen Victoria visited with the intention of purchasing the estate for the Prince of Wales; Ebenezer's wife remained in the house until her death in 1865, when their son William Fuller Maitland took over ownership. An attempt to sell by auction was made in 1866, but the eventual sale took place in 1867. The estate was bought at that time by Charles Easton of Whiteknights, Reading – a speculator, purchased with the intention of dividing the then 800-acre estate.

In 1869, the estate was bought by John Noble (Noble's Paints & Varnishes). The Noble family owned the estate until 1947, when John Noble's son Wilson Noble auctioned the property and land off in a number of lots. The house was bought by the Middlesex County Council and, in 1965, ownership was transferred to Hillingdon Council. The house was used as a boarding school for children 11 to 16 with health or emotional problems until 1988, when it was sold to private owners.

In June 2007, the house was sold to Michael Spink, a founder and owner of SPINK, for £42 million, making it the most expensive house sale in the United Kingdom outside London at the time.

Spink spent two years restoring the gardens and the main house. Park Place was sold to Russian businessman Andrey Borodin for a further record of £140 million, making it the most expensive house sale in the United Kingdom, in 2012. Spink retained 300 acres (120 ha) for further development. The Russian government claimed ownership in 2016.

== See also ==
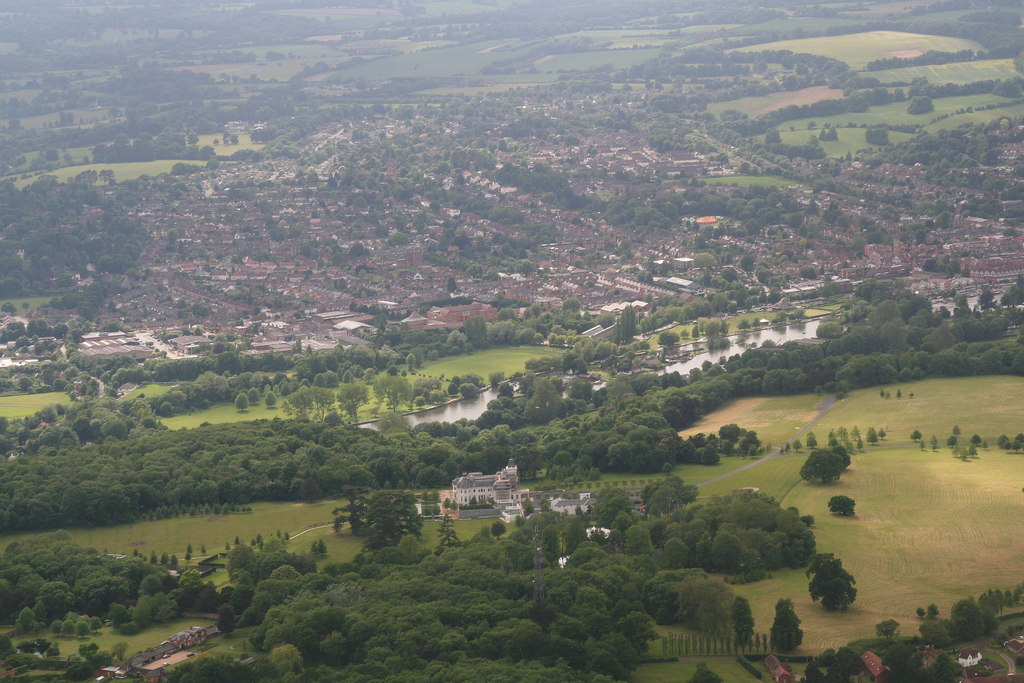
Park Place in the foreground of a 2013 aerial photograph, with the Thames and Henley beyond

- Anne Seymour Damer, Conway's daughter
