= Conway's Bridge =

Bridge in Berkshire, England

Coordinates: 51.5264°N 0.8808°W

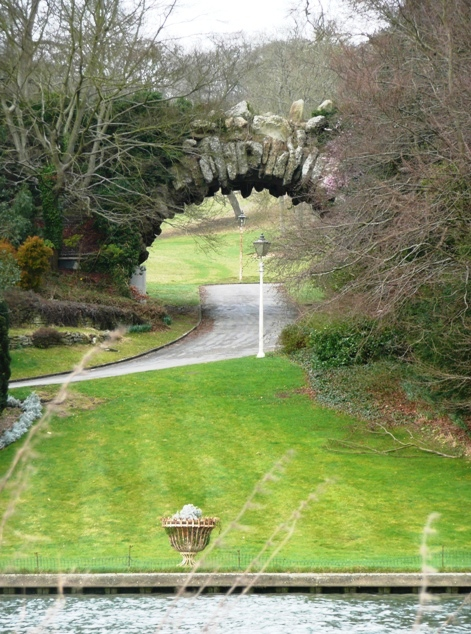
Conway's Bridge

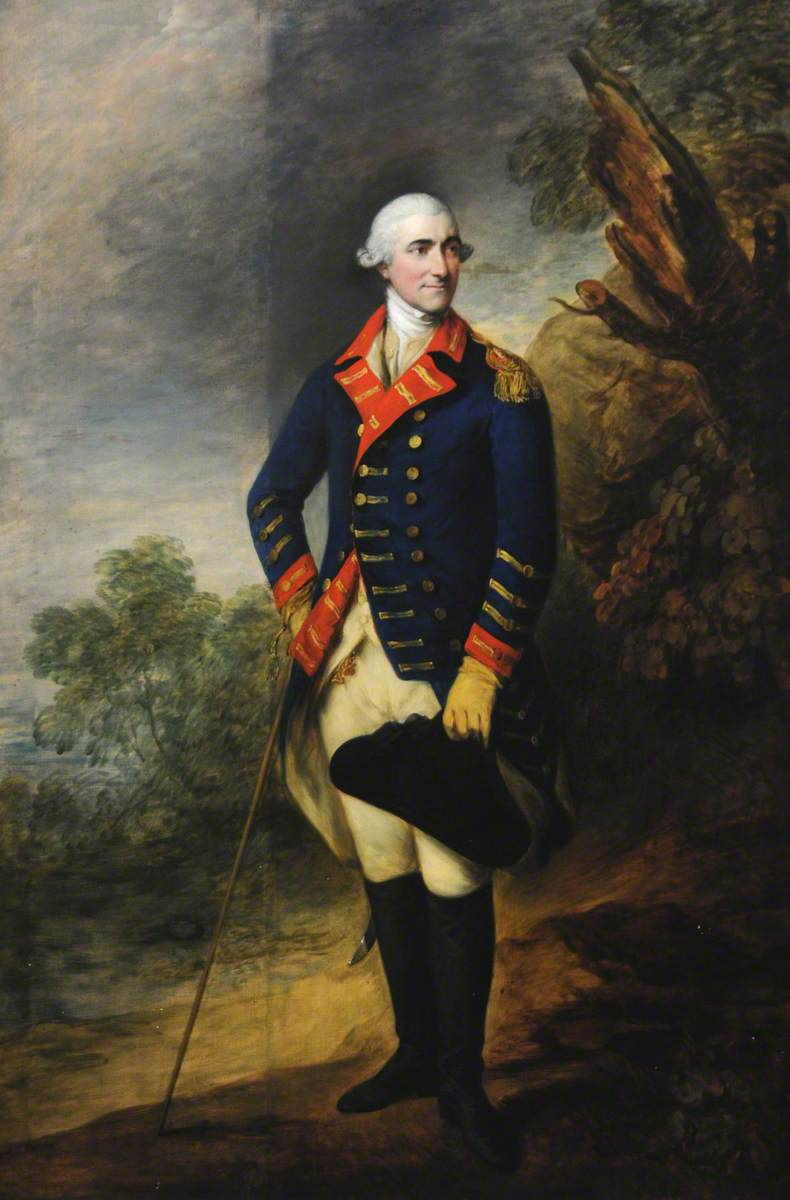
Henry Seymour Conway of Park Place, after whom the bridge is named

Conway's Bridge (a.k.a. Conway Bridge or the "Ragged Arch") is an ornamental rustic arched stone structure close to the River Thames on the estate of Park Place, Berkshire, England.

The bridge was designed by Humphrey Gainsborough, brother of the artist Thomas Gainsborough, and built in 1763 using stones from the ruins of Reading Abbey. The architect was Thomas Pitt, 1st Baron Camelford.

The bridge is named after Henry Seymour Conway (1721–1795), a former Governor of Jersey. Conway's Bridge still carries traffic on the road between Wargrave and Henley-on-Thames. It is Grade II listed.

Conway's Bridge is built of "cyclopian" blocks, imitating rocks. It is around 375 meters south of a grotto and frames the river from the grotto such that the river seems to be immediately beyond the bridge. In reality, the River Thames is around 50 meters from the structure. Proceeding under the bridge from the grotto, there is access to an ornamental lawn by the river, screened from the road by mature trees. Nearby to the bridge, there is an early 19th-century boathouse on the river.
