= Sapphire Tower =

Unbuilt skyscraper in Toronto, Canada

General information
- Type: Luxury hotel and condominium skyscraper
- Location: Toronto, Ontario, Canada
- Coordinates: 43.650391°N 79.382141°W

The Sapphire Tower was a proposed luxury hotel and condominium skyscraper in Toronto, Ontario, Canada, to be built by developer Harry Stinson. It was so named because all plans for it had deep blue glass curtain walls. This site had been involved in numerous other proposals, including Stinson's own Downtown Plaza concept, and an earlier proposal that would have incorporated the neighbouring Graphic Arts Building.

== First proposal ==
The first iteration of Sapphire Tower would have stood at 196 metres (643 ft) or 62 floors. Scheduled to begin construction in Spring 2007, the previous 90-storey proposal on Temperance Street, which would have stood at 342 metres (1,122 ft), was rejected because of shadow and height concerns.

According to a story in the February 16, 2007-edition of The Globe and Mail, after acquiring the property in 2003, high-profile Toronto developer Harry Stinson toyed with a skyscraper condo-hotel project for about a year. However, after announcing the project and securing investors, Stinson was unable to secure the full amount he needed for construction and lost control of the property when lenders recalled their loans.

On November 15, 2005, the Toronto and East York Community Council, a committee of Toronto City Council, refused permission for the tower to be built on its proposed site. At issue was the thin shadow that would have been cast by the building over Nathan Phillips Square, site of Toronto's City Hall. The Council argued that it needed to "protect City Hall's public square". Stinson planned to appeal the decision to the Ontario Municipal Board.

The design evolved to its proposed height in response to the approval of the Trump International Hotel & Tower by the city council. Stinson intended to create a friendly rivalry for the tallest residential building in Canada. Sapphire Tower would have been 17 metres taller.

In early January 2006, Stinson announced his intent to compromise with city council. Instead of a more than 90-storey building, the focus shifted to designing a shorter building of approximately 70 storeys, with a slanted roof that would further minimize the shadow concerns.

Sapphire Tower was to be operated much like Stinson's earlier hotel project 1 King West. Each of the over 1,000 suites was to be individually owned by its purchaser, with the opportunity of generating revenue through enrolment in a central management system.

Facing high levels of dissent from 1 King West owners at the hotel's lack of profitability, Stinson decided not to offer the same system to Sapphire Tower purchasers. Instead, the building would have consisted primarily of private residences, where the purchaser may occupy the suite or lease it out themselves in a traditional fashion. There would have been a small hotel component to the building of roughly 200 suites, but they would have been retained and operated by Stinson. With all the design and use changes, a new name to replace "Sapphire Tower" was expected but did not occur.

== Second proposal ==
After numerous designs the finalized height for the second proposal had been approved at 196 metres (643 feet) or 62 floors and 58,993 m² (635,000 sq. ft.) in density. Construction was expected to start in spring 2007, with an opening in early 2009. Levels 2 through to 11 would have been office space, Level 12 would have been an amenity floor for residences, Levels 13-42 would have been 'house like apartments', Levels 43-60 would have been a long stay boutique hotel, and Levels 61-62 would have been the sapphire penthouse suites in the crystalline part of the tower.

On July 20, 2007, Sapphire Tower Development Corp., the parent company owned by Stinson, was approved for bankruptcy protection. All future plans of development for the Sapphire Tower were stopped. Sapphire Tower Development Corp. listed the development (including land) for sale to respective buyers in order to repay creditors.

== Sale of the site ==
A partnership of Israel Land Development Company and Skyline International Development Inc. (the Canadian division of Mishorim Development) purchased the site at 70 Temperance Street in December 2007 from the property's receiver for C$24.1 million. The partners announced plans to build a 55-storey office, hotel, and residential skyscraper on the site for an estimated C$138 million. A 54-storey design by Page+Steele architects was later revealed.

== INDX Tower ==
By 2011, after several designs had been released, no construction had begun. In December 2011, Mishorim sold the undeveloped lot to CentreCourt Developments for C$39 million. CentreCourt, in partnership with Lifetime, marketed as a new condo development on the lot. The 51-floor 179 metres (587 ft) INDX Tower was completed in 2016 is shorter than the planned Sapphire Tower.

== See also ==
- List of tallest buildings in Toronto
