= Eduard Shifrin =

Ukrainian-Russian entrepreneur (born 1960)

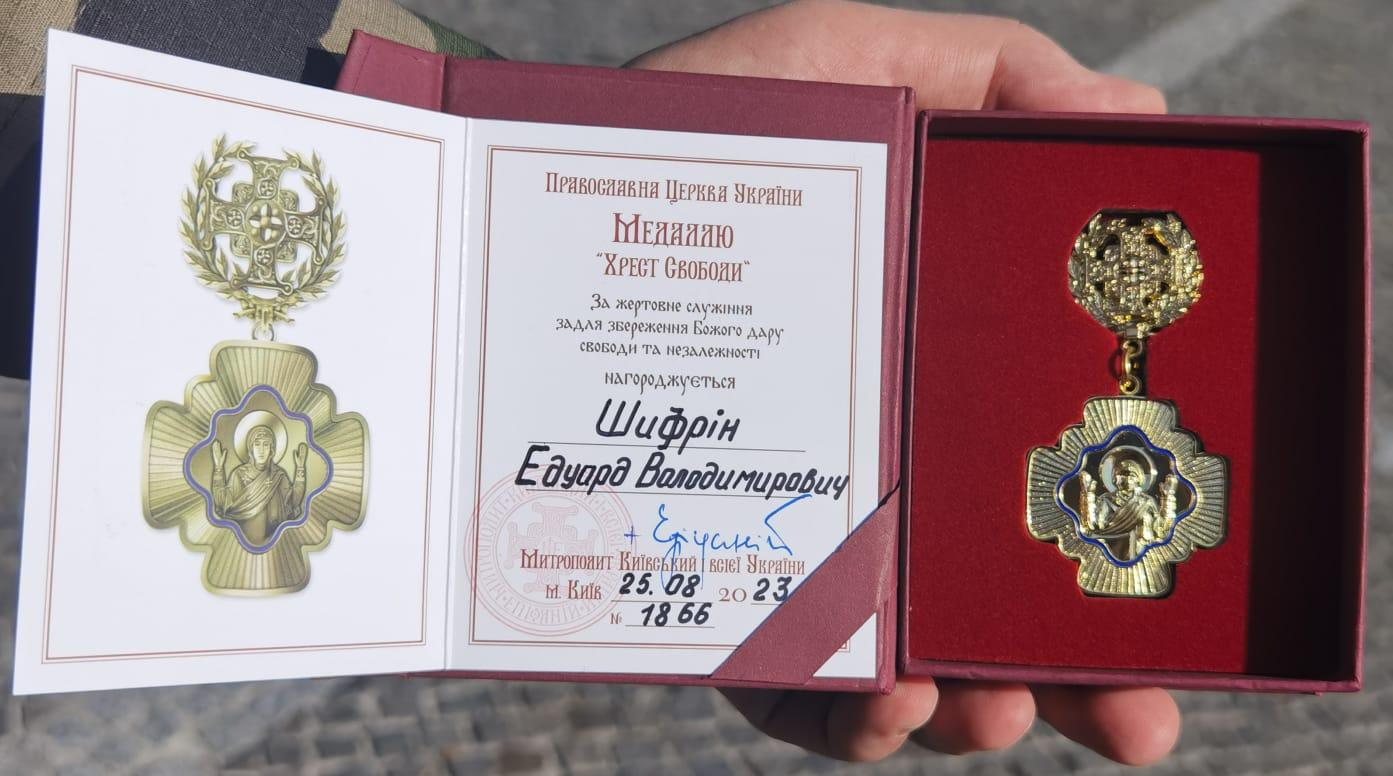

Eduard Volodymyrovych Shifrin (alternative spelling: Shyfrin) (Ukrainian: Едуа́рд Володи́мирович Шифрі́н; Russian: Эдуа́рд Влади́мирович Шифри́н; born 12 July 1960) is a Ukrainian entrepreneur who is a co-owner of the Midland Group. He is a resident in London.

== Biography ==
=== Early life and education ===
Shifrin was born in Dnipropetrovsk, Soviet Ukraine, the son of metallurgy professor Vladimir Moiseyevich Shifrin. In 1976–7 he came first in the National Ukrainian Physics Olympiad. From 1977 to 1983, he attended the Moscow Institute of Steel and Alloys, becoming a metallurgical engineer. He later returned to school and obtained a PhD in metallurgy in 1992.

=== Business career ===
From 1983 to 1993, Shifrin worked in Zaporizhia at the steel company Dniprospecstal, rising from assistant foreman to manager of the steel plant and then head of marketing. He then rose to prominence as a business oligarch in newly independent Ukraine, taking control of privatized steelmaker Zaporizhstal. He co-founded, with Alexander Shnaider, Midland Group, a holding company headquartered in Guernsey that embraces interests in steel (including Zaporizhstal, Ukraine's fourth largest steel mill), shipping, real estate, agriculture and sports. Together they owned Maccabi Tel Aviv and a Formula One team, Midland F1 Racing.

In the 2006 edition of the Sunday Times Rich List, Shifrin was listed at no. 59 with an estimated wealth of £920 million. In Forbes magazine's ranking of "The World's Billionaires" in 2009, Shifrin was ranked 559th with an estimated fortune of $1.3 billion. In 2013, Focus magazine estimated his net worth at $893.3 million, making him the No. 20 richest person in Ukraine. In 2008, the global economic crisis hit the group's assets, and the group began selling off its real estate and Russian and Ukrainian steel assets. In 2010, it sells the company's main asset, Zaporizhstal Steel Works, and all related assets. After that, the division of assets between Shifrin and Shnaider began, which was finally completed in 2017 after the business co-owners concluded the trial by signing a settlement agreement. As a result of the division, Shifrin acquires several Moscow properties, which he completes and sells, and then finally leaves Russia in 2020. By 2022 all his businesses in former-Soviet countries were closed.

=== Writing career ===
In 2006, together with his late father, Shifrin published a book titled The Theory of Metallurgical Processes in Ukrainian language for which he was awarded the State Prize of Ukraine.

In 2018 Shifrin's book From Infinity to Man: The Fundamental Ideas of Kabbalah Within the Framework of Information Theory and Quantum Physics was published in Russian, with an English edition being released in 2019 (now it is a bestseller on Amazon).

In 2019, his children's book Travels with Sushi in the Land of the Mind was published in English. In 2020 it was named a Distinguished Favorite by the Independent Press Award for Juvenile Fiction.

In 2026, Shifrin released a new book "The Relativity of Death: Part One: Basic Principles of Kabbalah of Information, Complete Theory of Information Space, Miracles and Maxwell’s Demon", further expanding his body of work at the intersection of philosophy, spirituality, and information-based interpretations of reality. Shyfrin is the creator of Kabbalah of Information, a concept he developed to connect elements of Jewish mysticism with modern scientific thought, particularly information theory.

The new publication continues his exploration of consciousness, meaning, and the structure of existence, and adds to his broader creative and intellectual output as an author, philosopher, and public thinker.

He is a main sponsor of Jewish Book Week London.

He is a creator of Kabbalah of information and regularly writes articles about it on his personal page in the Jerusalem Post.

=== Musical career ===
Shyfrin Alliance create an intoxicating mix of rock, blues and romantic balladry, with messages of unconditional love and antiwar sentiment.

Shifrin writes the jazz-rock-blues compositions (music and lyrics), which are then recorded in Paris under the Shyfrin Alliance project. The songs have been released on Spotify, Apple Music, SoundCloud, Amazon Music, as well as US, UK, French and German radio stations. The music videos were released on YouTube, Facebook, and TikTok.

Single releases:

Name	Year
Whiskey Blues	2024
Unconditional	2024
The Cage	2024
Lockdown	2024
Cheval Blanc Blues (French veresion)	2024
To Your Soul	2024
Buddhe Blues	2025
Winter Côte d'Azur	2025
In the Shadow of Time	2025
Colours of Time	2025

Album releases:

Album	Song	Year
Upside Down Blues	The Cage	2024
Upside Down Blues	Unconditional	2024
Upside Down Blues	I See Your Eyes	2024
Upside Down Blues	Upside Down Blues	2024
Upside Down Blues	Conversation With Love	2024
Upside Down Blues	Shakespeare Blues	2024
Upside Down Blues	G-D's Number Blues	2024
Upside Down Blues	Bridge of Paris	2024
Upside Down Blues	To Your Soul	2024
Upside Down Blues	Lockdown	2024
Upside Down Blues	Cheval Blanc lues	2024
Upside Down Blues	Whiskey Blues	2024
In the Shadow of Time	Colours of Time	2025
In the Shadow of Time	In the Shadow of Time	2025
In the Shadow of Time	Black Hole Blues	2025
In the Shadow of Time	Point A Point B	2025
In the Shadow of Time	Pendulum	2025
In the Shadow of Time	Buddha Blues	2025
In the Shadow of Time	Insanity Blues	2025

=== Philanthropy ===
In 2003 he financed the reconstruction of the oldest synagogue in Kyiv and Jewish educational center dedicated to his late father. He also co-sponsored the construction of synagogues in Moscow, Volgograd, and Zaporizhzhia. He sponsors over 60 Chabad educational classes for children. He served as regional vice-president of the World Jewish Congress. In May 2025 he was elected as vice-president of World Jewish Congress from Ukraine.

=== Political opinions ===
Following the outbreak of full-scale hostilities between Russia and Ukraine in 2022, Shifrin decried armed conflict and submitted a request to the Russian embassy in London in which he strongly condemned the aggression against Ukraine and requested the renunciation of his Russian citizenship. He and other family members donated to Ukrainian military hospitals and organizations supporting people within and near warzones. including the UK-based World Jewish Relief. In 2023, he was awarded the Cross of Freedom medal of the Orthodox Church of Ukraine for his work for Ukraine.

== Personal life ==
Shifrin and his wife have three children.
