= Fayland House =

Coordinates: 51.5915°N 0.8637°W

General information
- Type: Residential
- Location: Buckinghamshire, United Kingdom
- Completed: 2013

Technical details
- Floor area: 10,000 sq. ft

Design and construction
- Architect(s): David Chipperfield
- Architecture firm: David Chipperfield Architects
- Structural engineer: Alan Baxter Associates

Fayland House is a house in Buckinghamshire, England, in the Chiltern Hills between the villages of Skirmett and Hambleden. It was designed by David Chipperfield Architects. Fayland House is situated in an Area of Outstanding Natural Beauty.

== Appearance ==
Fayland House is a single storey, 888 square metre house built to resemble an earthwork.

== History ==
Fayland House was designed by David Chipperfield Architects for Mike and Maria Spink. The house was completed in 2013. It was awarded first prize in Architectural Review's AR House Awards in 2015.
