= One King West Hotel & Residence =

Condo hotel in Toronto, Canada

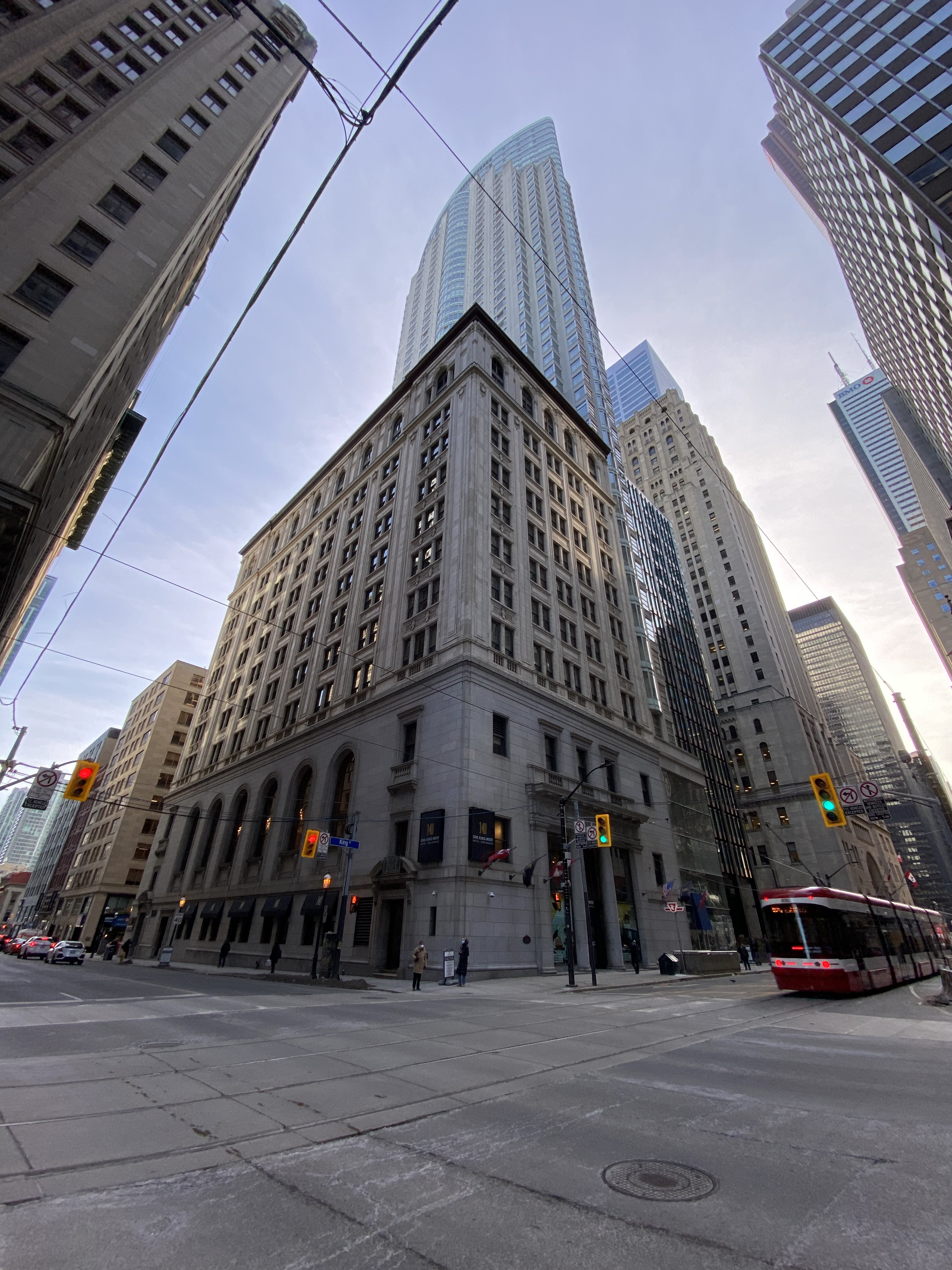

General information
- Type: Condo hotel
- Location: 1 King Street West; Toronto, Ontario, Canada
- Coordinates: 43.648808°N 79.378104°W
- Completed: 1914, 2006

Height
- Roof: 176 m (577 ft)
- Top floor: 176 m (577 ft)

Technical details
- Floor count: 51 and 17

Design and construction
- Architects: Darling and Pearson; Stanford Downey Architect Inc.

Website
- onekingwest.com

One King West Hotel & Residence (or 1 King West) is a condo hotel located at 1 King Street West in the financial district of Toronto, Ontario. It was completed in 2006 after a new tower was attached to the side of the heritage Dominion Bank Building (1914), itself an early 13-storey skyscraper. Four additional floors were also added on top of the heritage building. The site for One King West also included the neighbouring Michie & Co. Grocers & Wine Merchant at 7 King Street West which was demolished in 2001 to accommodate the residential tower.

== Overview ==
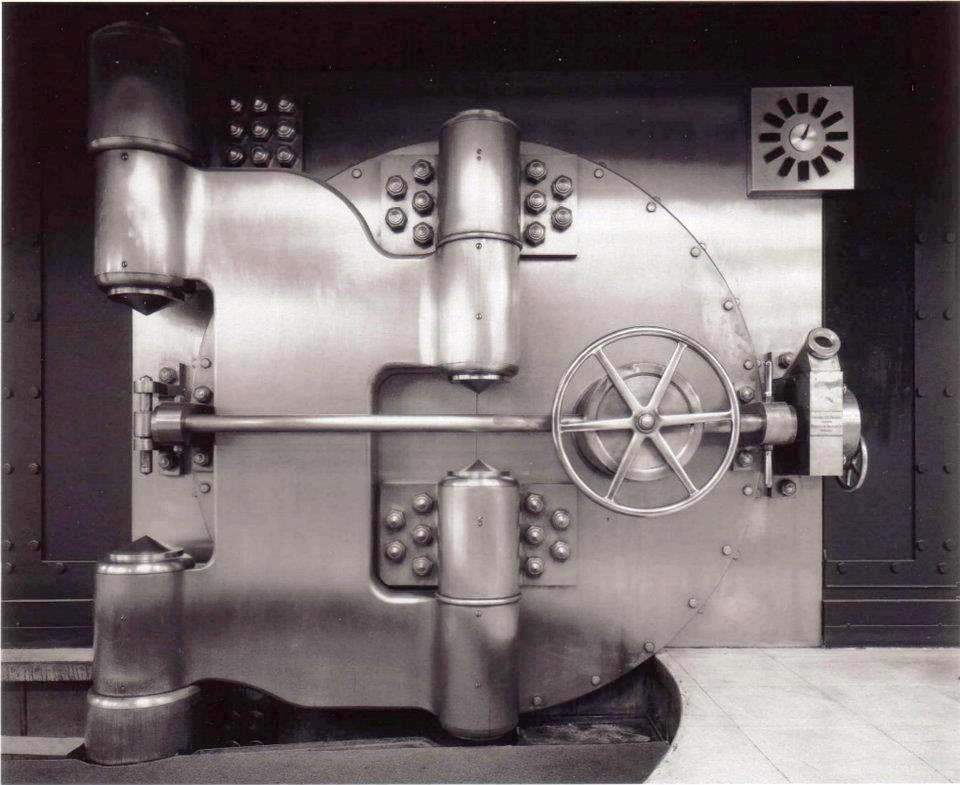
The vault with combination viewer was designed by Frederick S. Holmes and built by Remington & Sherman.

The building has 575 suites, including two 3-storey penthouses with around 600 employees. The suites are either in the new tower, or in the historic building forming the base of the complex. The Dominion Bank Building from 1914 was designed by Darling and Pearson in the Beaux-Arts style, with Renaissance Revival detailing. The new tower stands at 51 storeys or 176 metres tall. Stanford Downey Architect Inc. were the architects involved in the renovation.

The building was originally a bank. The Grand Banking Hall is a magnificent example of early 20th-century classicism with ornate detailing including stately Corinthian columns and towering windows. It has been converted into a large meeting room with a bar. The historic bank vault in the basement can be used for private meetings or meals. The lobby bar is appropriately named Teller's Bar.

Each suite in the hotel is individually owned, but the profits are shared amongst suite owners who have placed their suites in the hotel pool. Similar projects are usually seen in resort towns. The individual owners of the units in the building financed the purchase of the common assets of the hotel and now control the company that manages the hotel operations. Recent upgrades include converting several suites to have two beds instead of just king beds so that the hotel can be more appealing to group bookings.

The investors in 1 King West were involved in a dispute over property tax assessments for their units, as rather than being taxed at residential rates (approximately 1% of market value), they are being taxed at commercial hotel rates (approximately 4%). This dispute has been resolved and now units are taxed at commercial rates, but are valued also as commercial properties.

On March 9, 2007 Harry Stinson, the developer and operator of this project, filed for bankruptcy protection using the Companies' Creditors Arrangement Act at the Ontario Superior Court of Justice as a result of an $11.8 million dispute with David Mirvish, the financier of 1 King West. The condo corporation bought all the assets and now owns the entire building plus the hotel and related businesses.

== See also ==
- List of tallest buildings in Toronto
- List of tallest buildings in Canada
