= Alex Shnaider =

Canadian financier (born 1968)

Alexander Shnaider
- Александр Евсеевич Шнайдер
- Born: Alexander Yevseyevich Schnaider; 3 August 1968 (age 58); Chernivtsi, Ukrainian SSR, USSR
- Citizenship: Canadian
- Education: York University
- Occupations: Co-founder of the Midland Group and Talon International Development Incorporated

Alexander Yevseyevich Shnaider (Russian: Алекса́ндр Евсе́евич (А́лекс) Шнайдер; Hebrew: אלכסנדר (אלכס) שניידר; born 3 August 1968) is a Soviet-born Canadian entrepreneur and former commodities trader. He co-founded the Midland Group with Eduard Shifrin. Through Midland, he owned the Jordan Grand Prix Formula One team, which he renamed Midland F1 Racing for the 2006 Formula One season.

== Early life ==
Shnaider moved with his family to Israel when he was 4, and then to Canada when he was 13. He graduated from York University in Toronto in 1991 with a bachelor's degree in economics.

== Midland Group ==
In 1994, Shnaider co-founded Midland Group—originally a steel trader—with former business partner Eduard Shifrin. The company operated in Ukraine before government-owned steel factories were privatized. It was initially acting as sales agent and factor for some state owned companies. In 1999, Midland Resources began buying shares in the Zaporizhstal steel mill. By 2001, Shnaider's consortium had bought 93 percent of the mill for $70 million. In 2004, Shnaider stated that the main activities of the Midland Group were steel manufacturing, construction, shipping, and agriculture.

According to the Panama Papers, in 2010, Shnaider sold at least half of Midland's ownership in Zaporizhstal to buyers financed by Russian state-owned Vnesheconombank, who were then themselves acquired by the development bank.

== Sports investments ==
In February 2005, Shnaider bought Formula One team Jordan Grand Prix from Eddie Jordan for approximately US$50 million, and renamed it Midland F1 Racing for the 2006 Formula One season. On 9 September 2006, the team was sold to Spyker Cars for US$107 million.

In December 2007, Shnaider bought Israeli soccer team Maccabi Tel Aviv for an estimated 12 million euros. On 4 August 2009, Shnaider sold the club to Canadian property developer Mitchell Goldhar, after investing $20 million in the club. Goldhar took on Shnaider's 80 per cent stake in the club by agreeing to take on its financial commitments; he also paid $750,000 to the Maccabi Tel Aviv sports foundation for its 20 percent stake.

== Real estate ==
Shnaider partnered with Donald Trump in the construction of the Trump International Hotel and Tower in Toronto. Alex Shnaider's main co investor was Russian Canadian gaming entrepreneur Val Levitan. Trump was a minority shareholder in the project, and his firm owned the property management contract (the minority share and management contract were bought out in 2017, with the property renamed the Adelaide Hotel Toronto). In 2007, Shnaider was reported as having decided to keep the penthouse suite for himself, at an estimated value of $20 million. In 2017, the building and Shnaider were alleged as key links in a financial connection between Trump and the Russian government. Shnaider reportedly used proceeds from the sale of his Ukrainian steel mill to partially meet cost overruns at the Toronto Trump Tower.

In March 2010, Shnaider invested in a property consortium that bought Toronto's King Edward Hotel for $50 million. The asset was purchased in a distressed sale from Lehman Brothers. Shnaider originally invested alongside three other real estate companies, Skyline International Development Inc., Dundee KE Inc., and Serruya Realty Group Inc. However, on 1 August 2012, Omni Hotels & Resorts CEO James D. Caldwell also took a stake in the hotel; and on 24 November 2015, Omni Hotels and Resorts announced that it had bought the other parties out and fully owned the hotel.

In 2011, Shnaider formed a Delton Retail fund, a property group, with N3 Real Estate, owned by Dutch businessman A. D. G. van Dam.

On 30 December 2015, Shnaider invested 39 million NIS in Mishorim Development Ltd., a real estate company controlled by developer Gil Blutrich. Shnaider had already invested alongside Blutrich in the King Edward Hotel, which Blutrich invested in via Skyline International Development Inc., a Mishorim subsidiary. In July 2016, he increased his holdings in this company from 21% to 42%. He is currently the sole holder of controlling interest when the Israeli court ruled in favor of him in August 2020, in a legal lawsuit filed by his past partner Gil Blutrich.

== Personal life ==
Shnaider is married to Simona Shnaider (née Birshtein) daughter of Boris Birshtein. They have three daughters. In August 2016, they sold their home in Bridle Path, Toronto, for $22 million.

Schnaider is President of the Jewish Russian Community Centre of Ontario.
