= Dmitry Gerasimenko =

Russian businessman

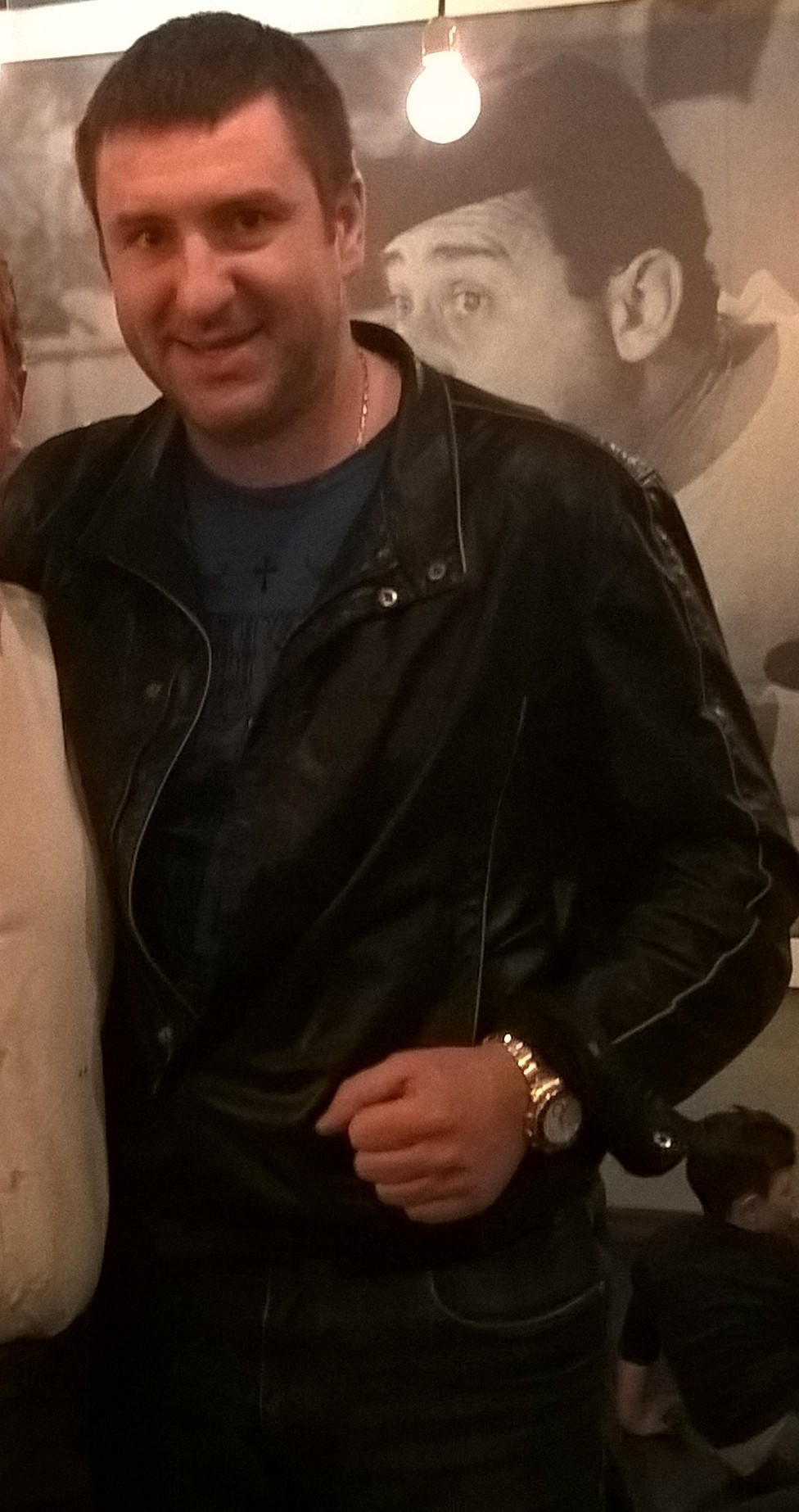
- Born: September 29, 1978 (age 47)
- Known for: Owner of Krasny Oktyabr Closed Joint-Stock Company, BC Krasny Oktyabr and Pallacanestro Cantù.

Dmitry Petrovich Gerasimenko (Russian: Дмитрий Петрович Герасименко; born 29 September 1978) is a Russian businessman, ex-owner of steel company Krasny Oktyabr Closed Joint-Stock Company and of basketball clubs BC Krasny Oktyabr and Pallacanestro Cantù.

== Biography ==
Of Ukrainian origin, Gerasimenko became a multimillionaire thanks to steel (actually he owns Krasny Oktyabr Closed Joint-Stock Company, the second largest steelmill in Russia) and gas.

In 2012 he founded the club of the same name of the factory, who got a wild card for the VTB United League.

In November 2015 has also acquired 65% of the shares of Pallacanestro Cantù.
