= Door chain =

Security device attached to a door

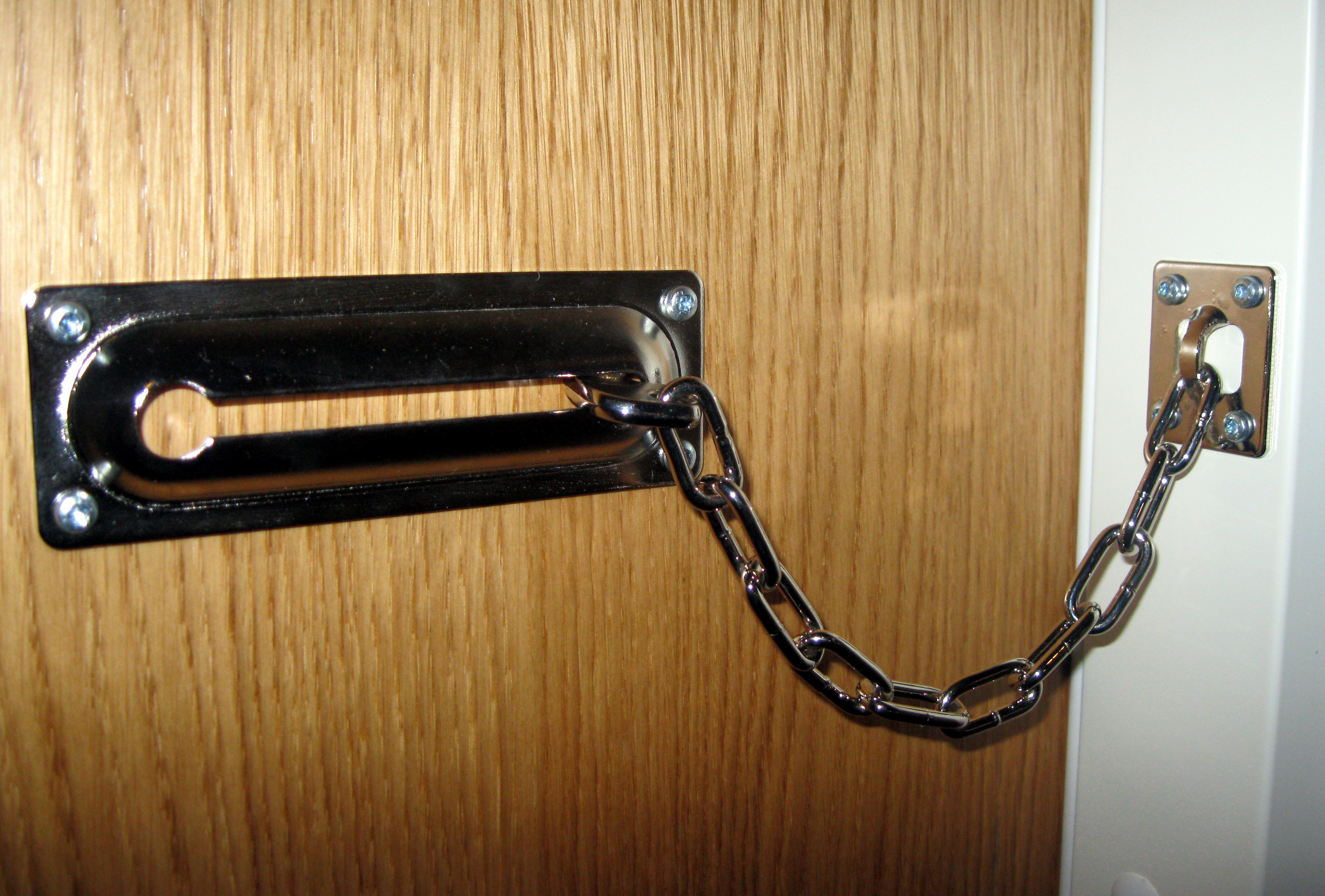
Door chain

A door chain, security chain, or security door chain or chain door interviewer consists of a small chain attached to the door frame, which attaches to a track on the door for security purposes. It is a type of lock that is often used along with other types of locks to secure a door. They are commonly used on hotel and motel room doors.

== Uses ==
Door chains are mainly intended to allow a person inside a structure to open the door slightly for purposes of communicating with individuals outside or exchanging small objects through the door while still preventing the individuals outside from gaining unauthorized access into the structure.

Door chains also can be set in place when the door does not need to be opened. They can only be touched from inside when the door has been opened, and therefore, if the locks on the door are compromised, a door chain may cause some delay, draw more attention, or leave more evidence of force being used when gaining unauthorized access to the structure.

== Advantages ==
Door chains are fairly easy to install and use. Use of a door chain provides a little security when dealing with strangers. A properly installed door chain is resistant to tampering from the outside requiring use of physical force to open the door, which will leave obvious evidence.

== Disadvantages ==
Door chains normally come equipped with very short screws which easily rip out. Any amount of force capable of defeating a deadbolt will also defeat a door chain. The tracks are usually straight, and any number of simple tools will allow the chain to be separated from the track. Elderly individuals, uncoordinated people, and individuals with hand tremors may find it difficult to connect the chain to the track. The chain is often a thin metal. Door chains are often installed improperly, making them easily subjected to a number of attacks.

UPVC/PVCU front doors are generally unsuitable for retrofit security devices. Not only is the material not strong enough to support devices fitted with steel screws unless secured into the internal metal framework, but such changes to the original design may invalidate an existing warranty or possibly damage the integral locking assembly.

== Improvements ==
- When fitting a standard door chain featuring a linear slide, it is imperative that it not allow the door to open sufficiently for a person's hand to reach through the gap between the door and the doorframe, as otherwise the door chain could be quickly opened from the outside by an intruder.

== Alternatives ==
- Security screen doors add a second set of hinges or locks to defeat before access to a structure can be granted. If the intention is to keep thieves out, or keep disturbed individuals in, this is a better solution. Security screen doors also make it possible to open the main door, and communicate with those outside. Some even have mail slots. As an added benefit, security screen doors can allow the door to be opened, and provide for secure ventilation. The main downside is the cost, which is generally about as much as a regular door, and locks are usually sold separately. Installation can also be difficult, as the doorknobs of the two doors may interfere with each other, and the screen material usually interferes with any peephole devices on the door.

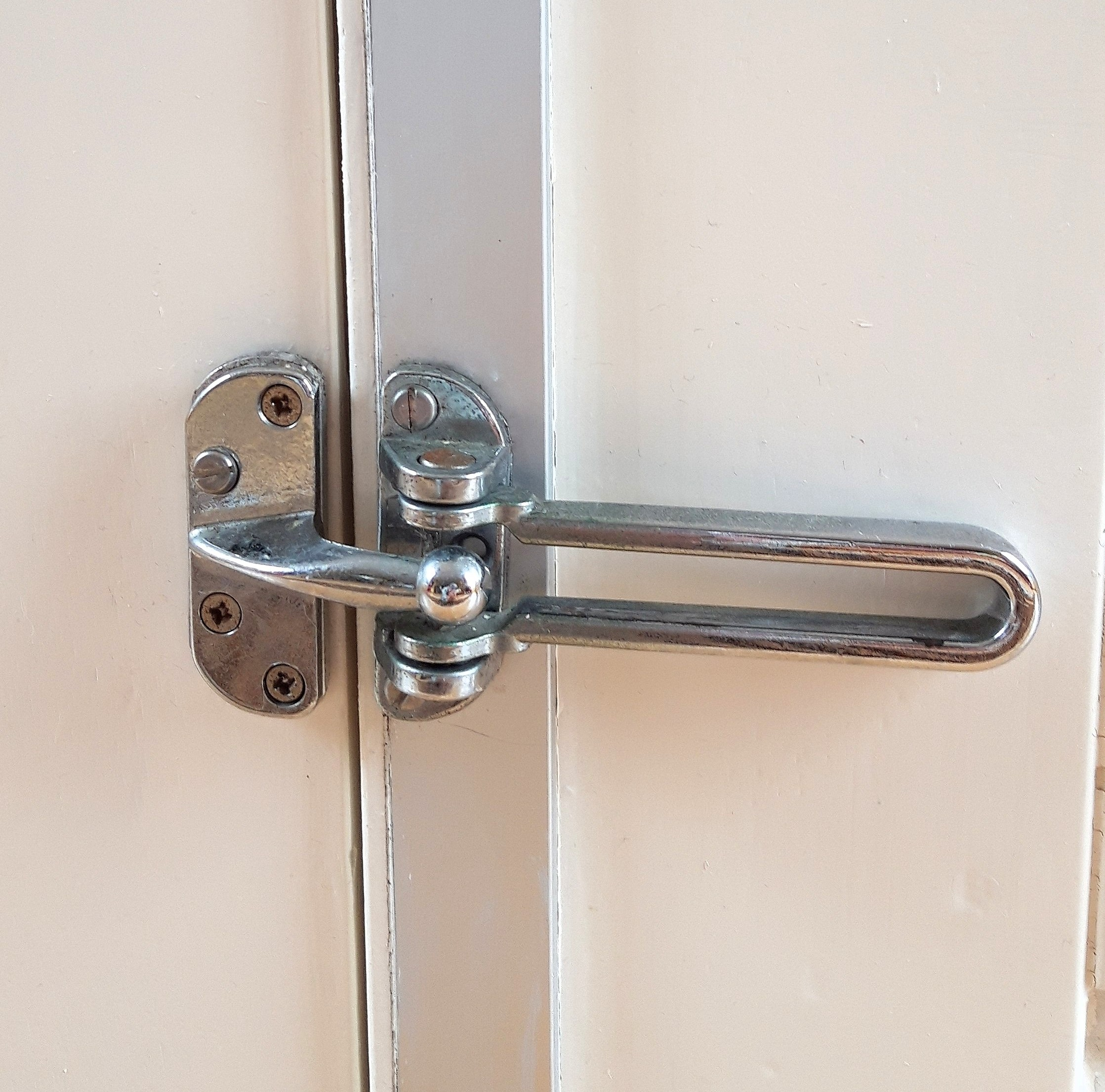
swing bar lock

- A door security restrictor, a.k.a. a door swing bar lock, is a newer device intended to replace door chains. It consists of a U-shaped bar that attaches to a hinge on the doorframe, and a knob on the door. The bar swings over the knob to restrict the full opening of the door. Door bars are easier to use, and can be made of much sturdier material than door chains. Door bars cannot be defeated in the same way that door chains can be, although they can be defeated just as easily in different ways. A disadvantage to door bar installation is that the door must be level with the wall, so the lock cannot be used if the home has trim that projects from the wall.
- Intercoms, peep holes, and mail slots can all serve purposes similar to the door chain when dealing with strangers, and function without opening the door. Of course, these devices do not provide additional protection to the door itself.
