= Midland Group =

Company

- Industry: International trading and investment
- Founder: Alex Shnaider
- Headquarters: Guernsey
- Area served: Worldwide
- Owner: Alex Shnaider

The Midland Group is an international trading and investment holding company. Registered in Guernsey under the name Midland Resources Holding Ltd, the group owns a number of subsidiaries across the agriculture, manufacturing, real estate, shipping and steel industries. The group's co-founders are billionaires Alexander Shnaider (chairman), a Soviet-born Canadian national, and Ukrainian-born Eduard Shifrin of London, UK.

Primarily active in the Commonwealth of Independent States as well as Eastern Europe and the Far East, the Midland group of companies has a presence in 34 countries worldwide.

According to the Panama Papers, in 2010, Shnaider sold at least half of Midland's ownership in Zaporizhstal steel mill to buyers financed by Russian state-owned Vnesheconombank, who were then themselves acquired by the development bank. Shnaider used proceeds from the sale to partially meet cost overruns at his Toronto Trump Tower.

== Electric Networks of Armenia ==
In 2002, Electric Networks of Armenia (ENA) was privatized by Midland Resources Holding. 100% of ENA shares were sold to Midland Resources Holding company.

== Sports investments ==
=== Formula One ===
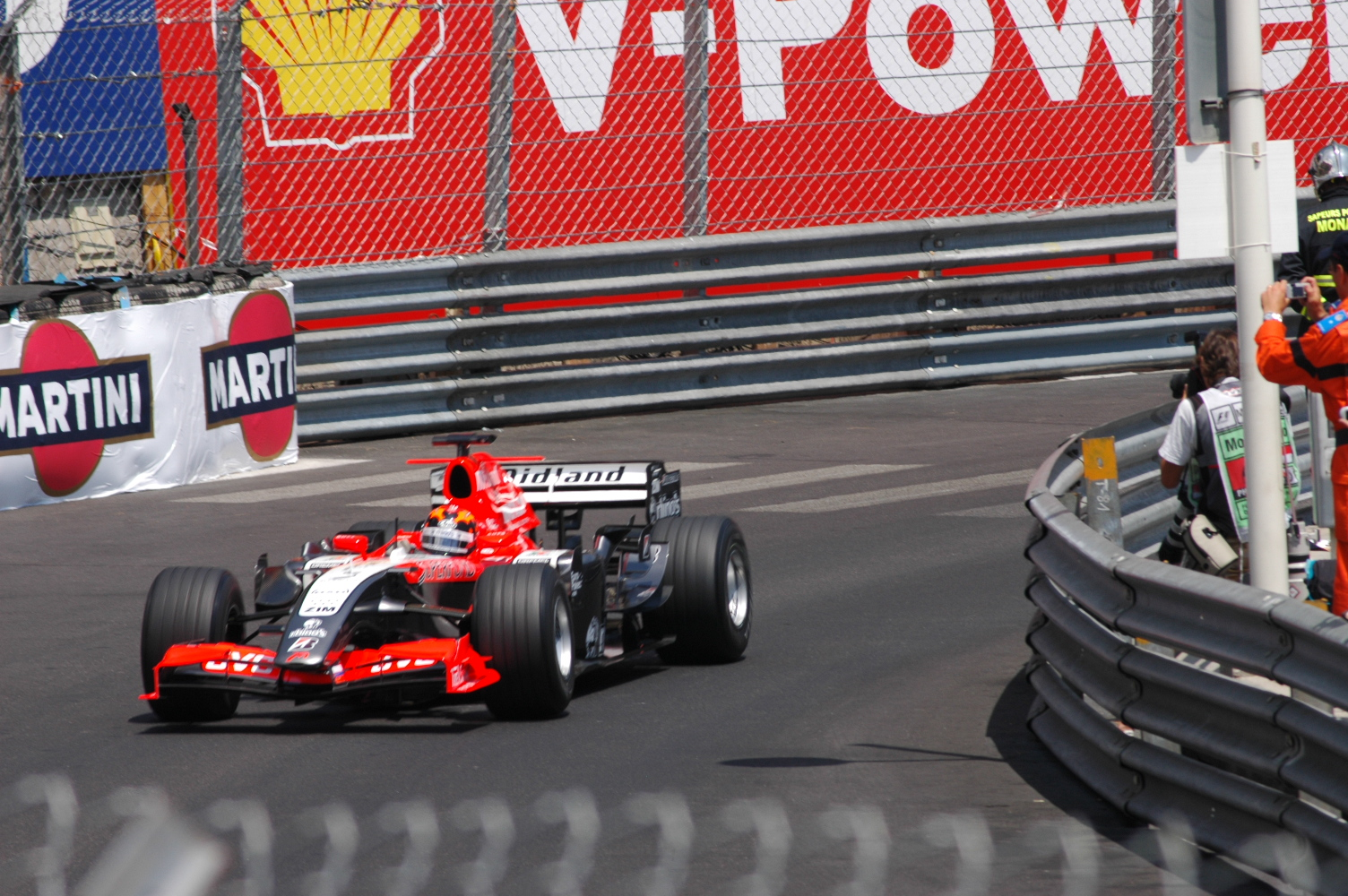
The Midland M16 of Christijan Albers at the 2006 Monaco Grand Prix

In October 2004, the Midland Group announced its intention to enter Formula One motor racing in 2006, with plans to use a car built by the Italian manufacturer Dallara. In January 2005 the group changed plans by purchasing the Jordan Grand Prix team from Eddie Jordan for approximately US$50 million. Businessman Alex Radunsky served as Midland F1's managing partner for Russia and was a co-owner of the team alongside Shnaider. They kept the yellow-liveried EJ15 cars and declared 2005 to be a year of learning. Under the name Midland F1 Racing, the team made its debut with a brand-new car and livery at the start of the 2006 Formula One season. With this team, Shnaider declared his intention to bring the first Russian driver into the sport, a feat not achieved until Vitaly Petrov's entrance into F1 with Renault, three years after Schnaider sold the team. On 9 September 2006, the team was sold to Spyker Cars for $106.6 million.

In 2007, the team competed as Spyker F1, and in 2008 was sold to Indian businessman Vijay Mallya and was renamed Force India F1.

From the beginning of the 2008 season, the team became known as Force India and remained active until 2018, when a group of consortium led by Lawrence Stroll bought the assets of the former team in 2018 following a financial collapse that forced Force India to be put under administration. From 2018 to 2020 the new team competed under the Racing Point banner. In 2021 the team was rebranded as Aston Martin.
