= Dneprospetsstal =

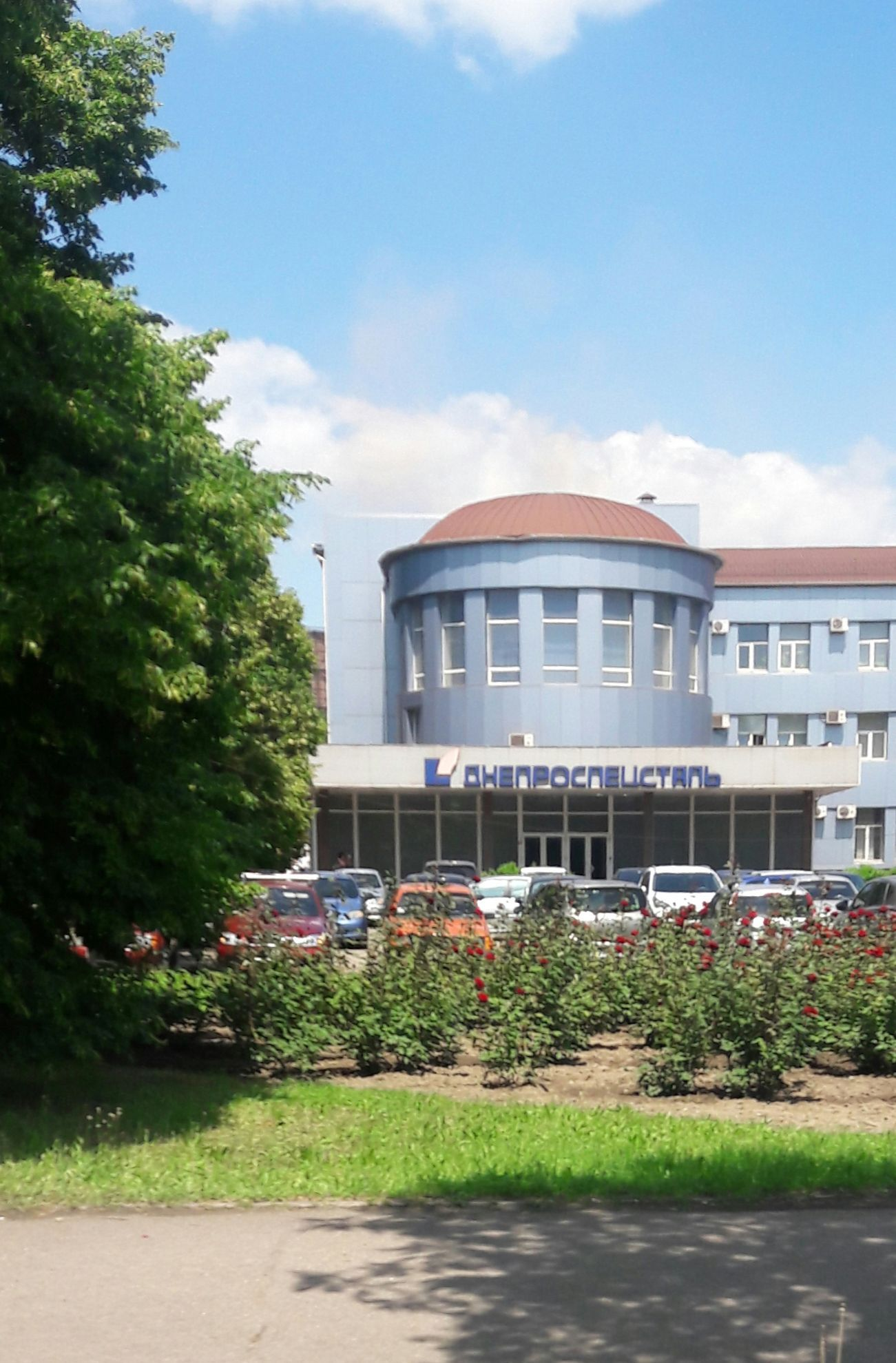
Dneprospetsstal

Dneprospetsstal (Ukrainian: Дніпроспецсталь; Russian: Днепроспецсталь), known as DSS, is a Ukrainian manufacturer of special stainless steel. The company is based in Zaporizhia in southeastern Ukraine, and was founded as a state-run enterprise in 1932 (94 years ago). Its full name is JPrSC Electrometallurgical Works Dneprospetsstal named after A. N. Kuzmin. It is a publicly traded company.

Dneprospetsstal manufactures and sells metal products of stainless, tool, high-speed (including those produced by the PM-method), bearing, structural, alloyed and carbon steel grades. Dneprospetsstal manufactures over 800 steel grades of 1200 section sizes. DSS' products are used in the manufacture of machinery parts, tools for metal and alloy machining, seamless pipes and bearings. Company’s steel production capacities comprise steel-making shops equipped with open basic electric arc furnaces, induction furnace and electro slag re-melting (ESR) and vacuum arc re-melting (VAR) facilities.

DSS steel processing is concentrated in a rolling shop, which contains blooming mills and a few rolling mills, a forging shop, a forging press shop, a cold drawing shop and a metal finishing shop.

DSS quality management system meets the requirements of international standards. In 2008, the enterprise was certified to ISO 9001:2008. Product quality meets the requirements of GOST (CIS), ASTM, AISI (USA), EN (EU), DIN (Germany), BS (Great Britain), AFNOR (France), JIS (Japan).
