= Vasily Anisimov =

Soviet/Croatian businessman (born 1951)

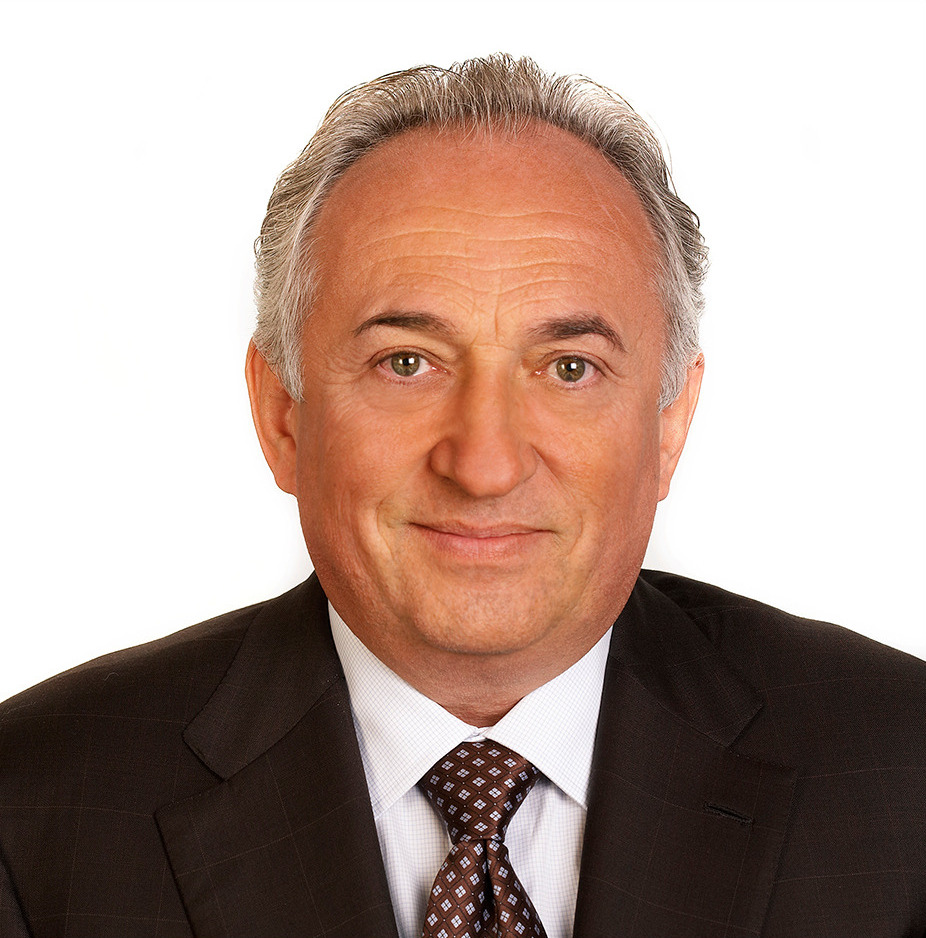
- Born: Vasily V. Anisimov; 19 September 1951 (age 75); Alma-Ata, Kazakh Soviet Socialist Republic, USSR
- Education: Alma-Ata Institute of National Economy
- Occupation: Property developer
- Spouses: Galina Anisimova (divorced) Ekaterina Anisimova (divorced)
- Children: 4
- Awards: Order of Alexander Nevsky; Order of Honour; Order of Friendship (Kazakhstan)
- Website: https://www.coalco.ru/en/

Vasily Anisimov (Croatian: Vasilij Anisimov; born 19 September 1951) is a Croatian billionaire businessman who made his fortune in Russia in a variety of industries, including aluminium, real estate and vodka production. He is also a former president of the Russian Judo Federation. In September 2022, he renounced his Russian citizenship.

Anisimov is founder of real estate development company Coalco and is a former shareholder of Metalloinvest, a Russian industrial conglomerate, which consolidated in 2006 JSC Metalloinvest's assets (the Mikhailovsky GOK and the Ural Steel) with those of Gazmetall JSC (the Lebedinsky GOK and the Oskol Electrometallurgical Plant).

== Biography ==
Anisimov graduated with a degree in economics from the Alma-Ata Institute of National Economy in 1977.

After graduation he worked as a commodity expert and then became commercial director of the Kaztorgodezhda (Russian: «Казторгодежда») trading base in Kazakhstan.

From 1982 to 1986 Anisimov was head of the working supply department of the Kalinin Nuclear Power Plant and then from 1986 to 1989, he served as general director of the Moscow-based hardware wholesaler, Roskhoztorg (Russian: «Росхозторг»). He recalled his activities as involving the sale of scarce goods, the presence of his own office and a personal car "Volga". Anisimov maintained personal relationships with officials, "everything was decided at the level of vodka. We went with the right person to some restaurant, drank and agreed on how to quickly go through bureaucratic processes ... "

In 1989 Anisimov started Trust Company (Russian: «Траст»), a company exporting non-ferrous metals. The firm's special exporter status made it possible to trade with clientele in Western countries, and Anisimov developed his personal approach of accelerating bureaucratic procedures by taking the appropriate people to dinner. Trust received $1 million from each project, and in three years of work it built 24 brick factories.

After Trust Company (Russian: «Траст») was rebranded as Transconsult (Russian: «Трастконсалт») and its company activities shifted into aluminium trading, Anisimov was General Director of CJSC Trasconsult from 1990-1994. This coincided with a turbulent time in Russian history with the privatisation of state-owned assets and fierce competition for control of the valuable aluminium industry. Transconsult acquired refineries and smelters including the Krasnoyarsk Aluminium Plant, the Achinsk Alumina Refinery and the Bratsk Aluminium Smelter. Anisimov's original goal had been to earn money and leave Russia for life in the west, "[when] privatisation began. I could not resist the temptation to become the owner of the enterprises with which I had already worked ... "

Anisimov's working methods were described by Dmitry Bosov, chairman of the board of Alltek investment:

"There are people who are looking for conflicts, and there are people who, on the contrary, try to avoid them. Anisimov is just from the second breed. It was Vasily Vasilyevich who then put everyone in Krasnoyarsk at the negotiating table. It took him two months, after which all three groups of shareholders worked at the enterprise for two and a half years."

Transconsult sold its assets to partner company Renova for an undisclosed sum in 2000.

== Business interests ==
Before 1999, he was on the Board of Directors of the July 1990 established Bidzina Ivanishvili associated Moscow based Rossiysky Credit Bank (Russian: ОАО АКБ «Российский кредит»).

=== Metalloinvest ===
In 2000, after being sued by fellow Russian billionaire Mikhail Khodorkovsky, Anisimov liquidated most of his assets. Anisimov re-emerged in 2004 as a co-owner of Metalloinvest with fellow billionaires Alisher Usmanov and Andrei Skoch. (Note: By January 2009, Metalloinvest holding was owned with a 50% stake by Alisher Usmanov, 30% by the Andrei Skoch associated Skoch Fund, and 20% by Anisimov.) Anisimov had been friends with Usmanov since 1989, “I always informed Vasily about the appearance of certain major acquisitions.” Usmanov was reported as saying.

Metalloinvest went on to become Russia's largest iron ore mining company. The company has three main businesses: iron ore, steel and scrap metal.

In December 2004 Anisimov and Usmanov acquired 97.6% of Mikhailovsky GOK, in one of the largest private equity deals in Russian history. Negotiations were led by Anisimov. In 2005 the company took over Lebedinsky GOK, the largest supplier of hot-briquettes iron in Russia. Moldova Steel Works, the largest industrial plant in Transnistria was another Metalloinvest asset. It employed over 1000 workers and engineers and 90% of its products were exported abroad. The company was returned to the Transnistrian state in 2015.

Anisimov eventually sold his 20% stake in the Metalloinvest to Russian bank VTB in 2011 citing the need for a change in The Moscow Times, "I am 59 years old, and I work 18 hours a day. I would like to spend more time with my family" Anisimov also stated he wanted to devote more time to his real estate development business interests. The stake was subsequently bought back by Metolloinvest in 2012.

A subsequent court action brought by the family of the late Badri Patarkatsishvili in 2014 over part-entitlement to the 20% Metalloinvest share was settled out of court. Details of the settlement remained confidential.

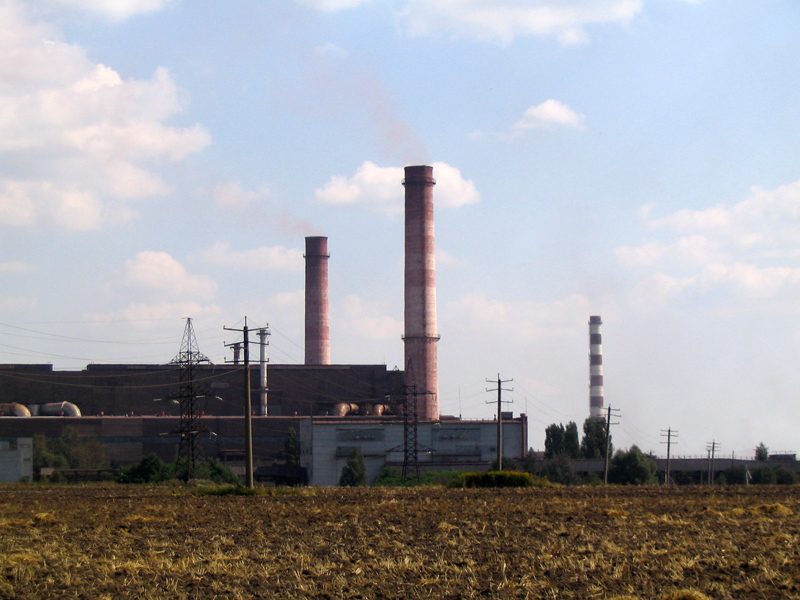
Mikhailovsky GOK, one of the largest iron ore mining and processing facilities in Russia and part of the mining division of Metalloinvest LLC

=== Coalco ===
Alongside his career in aluminium, Anisimov established Coalco in 1994. Coalco initially situated itself in the metals industry, including ownership of aluminium smelters, bauxite mines, semi-finished producers, cable plants, energy producers and cryolite plants. However, after Anisimov's break from the mining industry, Coalco moved into real estate.

The company manages projects in residential and industrial real estate as well as managing land assets. Coalco own 37,000 acres of land in the Moscow region.

On the banks of the Zlodeika (Russian: Злодейка) at the Domodedovsky District in the Moscow Oblast, Coalco built Akulinino (Russian: Акулинино) which is, similar to Rublyovka, a luxury residential development of 18,000 hectares (44,000 acres) located 35 kilometres (22 mi) from the Moscow Ring Road on the Kashirskoye Highway (Russian: Каширское шоссе). (Note: According to Roman Shleinov and Elena Vinogradova, Sergey Chemezov and Nikolai Tokarev, who are KGB officers that were close to Vladimir Putin during their years at Dresden, Vladimir Vladimirovich Artyakov, (Note: Vladimir Vladimirovich Artyakov (Russian: Владимир Владимирович Артяков; born July 30, 1959 in Moscow) is the General Director (CEO) of AvtoVAZ and a very close friend of Sergey Chemezov.) Arkady Rotenberg, Sergei Yastrzhembsky, Vladimir Yakunin and his associate Sergey Bashkov, (Note: Sergey Bashkov (Russian: Сергей Башков) heads the legal department of Venture Investments & Yield Management, which is an investment and management company associated with Vladimir Yakunin's son Andrey Yakunin.) Alexei Beseda, who is the son of the head, since 2009, of the FSB's Fifth Servuice, which is the operational information and international relations service, Colonel-General Sergey Beseda, (Note: At Akulinino (Russian: Акулинино), both Tatyana Krutova, who is a relative of the first deputy head of the economic security service (Russian: первый заместитель начальника службы экономической безопасности) of the FSB Andrey Krutov (Russian: Андрей Крутов), and Oleg Anatolyevich Groshev, who is a relative of the deputy head of the FSB economic security service, head of the "P" department (counterintelligence support of industrial facilities) (Russian: заместитель начальника службы экономической безопасности ФСБ, начальник управления «П» (контрразведывательное обеспечение промышленных объектов)) Anatoly Groshev (Russian: Анатолий Грошев), have plots away from the Zlodeika (Russian: Злодейка).) numerous heads of state-owned companies and state corporations which are close to Vladimir Putin, FSB generals and businessmen from the Yeltsin era have owned property at Akulinino.)

It was reported in 2015 that the company planned to build a multifunctional complex at Tsarskaya Square in Moscow of 280,500 square meters, at a cost of $430 million. The project was completed in two years.

In 2015 Anisimov transferred Coalco assets totalling more than 1 million square meters to MR Group Management, retaining ownership of the land, with MR Group Management responsible for all ongoing and future development processes.

Coalco also has maintains a presence in the New York City real estate market through Coalco New York, and subsidiary company Corigin Holdings building housing for students at New York University as well as acquisitions, development and property management. The company has a branch in Zürich.

=== Company investments ===
==== WAVIoT ====
Since 2011 WAVIoT has built wireless networks to connect low-power objects such as electricity meters and water meters, which need to be continuously on and transmitting small amounts of data. Anisimov has been a major investor.

==== Kristall ====
In December 2009, Vasily Anisimov with support from VTB Bank and the VTB CEO Andrey Kostin acquired the shares of all eleven Kristall Vodka plants from FSUE Rosspirtprom for 55 billion rubles. Management of the plants was retained by Rosspirtprom, the Federal State Unitary Enterprise and Anisimov's East European Distribution Company (EEDK) became the exclusive distributor of Rosspirtprom. Anisimov subsequently resold the shares of the factories to ex-Senator Alexander Sabadash. At the end of 2009, Anisimov owned a 51% stake in the Moscow vodka factory "Kristall" and by June 2010 he had increased his share to 86%. The vodka Putinka (Russian: «Путинка»), established in 2003, has been bottled by Moscow Crystal Plant since the fall of 2009.

=== Other business interests ===
Anisimov has served as a member of the administrative council of Rossiysky Kredit and one of many "Russian oligarchs" named in the Countering America's Adversaries Through Sanctions Act, CAATSA, signed into law by President Donald Trump in 2017. Anisimov responded to the sanctions by saying this was a pity but given the right conditions Russia and the United States could work closely together, "reason must win; it's only a matter of time."

In 2016, Anisimov negotiated a deal with Kazakh KTZ Express on the construction of a transport and unloading complex "Central Dry Port" worth $169 million.

From 2003 to 2005 Anisimov invested $100 million in the Corus Group, a British steelmaker now part of Tata Steel.

Anisimov has produced several films, including Мусорщик (The Scavenger) and Burning Hot Saturday, which were co-produced by Aleksei Guskov, and Water, which won three TEFI awards, "I only finance films that are not related to crime, which awaken something good in the audience."

== Russian Judo Federation ==
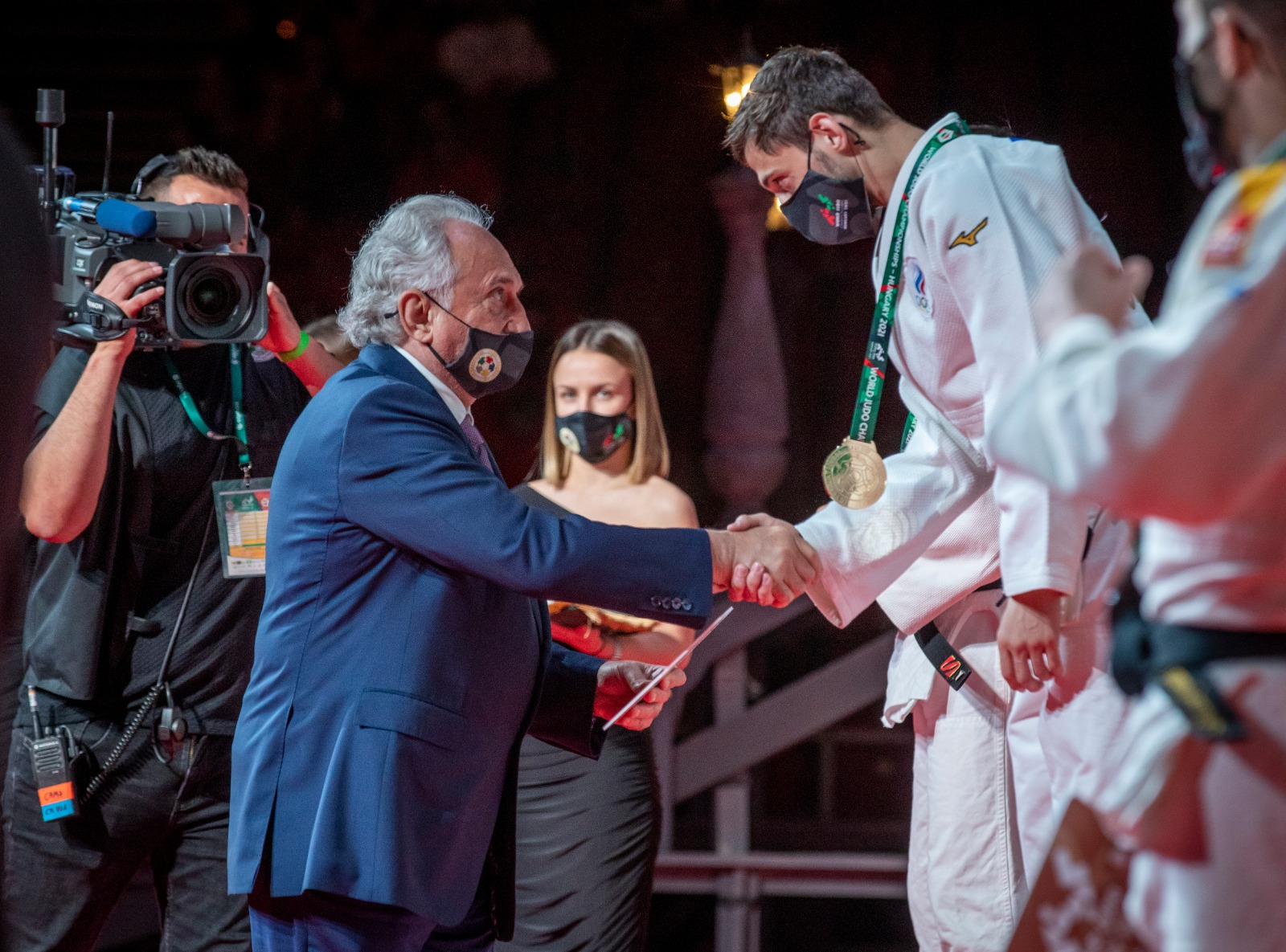
Vasily Anisimov presenting the gold medal to Yago Abuladze at the 2021 World Judo Championship in Budapest, Hungary

Anisimov was head of the Russian Judo Federation from 2010 to 2022. Under his leadership Russia topped the medal table with three golds at the 2012 Summer Olympics, winning a further two gold medals at the 2016 Rio de Janeiro Olympics. Anisimov also served as an ambassador for the International Judo Federation.

During his tenure, Anisimov oversaw major tournaments such as the 2012 European Judo Championships and 2014 World Judo Championships in Chelyabinsk, 2013 Judo World Masters in Tyumen, the 2016 European Judo Championships in Kazan, the 2014 Golden League European Club Championships in Samara, 2016 Golden League European Club Championships in Grozny and the elite Masters tournament in Saint Petersburg in 2017.

Anisimov's time in charge of the Russian Judo Federation coincided with a large increase in participation in Judo in Russia. He advocated participation in Judo for children as young as seven, "now children practice from the age of ten, but this bar should be lowered," Anisimov told reporters in 2016.

In 2017 Anisimov was presented with a certificate conferring sixth dan by head of the International Judo Federation Marius Vizer. The same year Anisimov was awarded the Order of Alexander Nevsky for his services to Judo. The award ceremony was held in the Catherine Hall of the Kremlin on July 7.

Anisimov is also a member of the supervisory board of the All-Russian Volleyball Federation.

In October 2022 Anisimov ended his tenure for family reasons.

== Philanthropy ==
Anisimov is known for his active interest in the Russian Orthodox Church and has overseen the restoration of 30 churches. During his absence from business in 2000 he spent time on Mount Athos and spoke with priests, "I never in my life thought that I would kneel. And now I meet morning and evening with prayer."

He has provided financial assistance to the Moscow Diocesan House, which houses the theological faculty of the Orthodox St. Tikhon University for the Humanities. Church restoration work includes the Temple-Monument on Blood in the Name of All Saints on the site of Ipatiev House in Ekaterinburg, where the family of the last Russian emperor was shot.

== Personal life ==
Anisimov has been married twice. To Galina Anisimova and has four children.

Their daughter, also named Galina, was murdered along with her husband, Alexander Nalimov, both found "bound and killed execution-style," in their Ekaterinburg home in 2000. A second daughter is the actress and entrepreneur Anna Schafer, star of the 2017 film Elizabeth Blue and co-founder of cosmetics range Bare Essential Organics. His second marriage was to Ekaterina, and brought another daughter and a son.

Until 2017 his main residence was in Küsnacht, Switzerland; 2017 he moved to Moscow. He maintains properties there and in New York.

In an interview with Forbes, Anisimov described his life, "I have no hobbies, I cannot sit with a fishing rod for days or hunt down an animal. It so happened that my hobby is work. As long as I am quite an active person, as long as I can stay awake for three days, I have to move forward."

== See also ==
- List of Russian people by net worth
