= Putinka =

Brand of Russian vodka

Putinka (Russian: Путинка) is a brand of Russian vodka made by the Moscow Distillery Crystal company. Created in 2003 by Vinexem Brand Manager Stanislav Kaufman, the brand plays upon President Vladimir Putin's name.

The brand is owned by businessman Arkady Rotenberg, a close confidant of Putin, though Putin has no formal involvement in the production of Putinka. Putinka was formerly one of the most popular vodka brands in the Russian market, though the brand's popularity began to decline in 2016.

== History ==
The brand belonged to the Vinexim company, the creator of the brand is marketer Stanislav Kaufman. Registration restrictions were avoided, since the word «putinka» is not an exact copy of the surname, in addition, it means the Russian fishing term «Putin». When launching the brand on the market, the calculation was made on the popularity of President Putin among Russians, and the release of the product is planned to continue even after he leaves the post of president: «This vodka is associated with something very good. After 2008, her popularity will only increase». On the other hand, according to the representative of the company, sales volumes in the regions of the «red belt» with strong support of the Communist Party lag behind compared to other regions. In 2008, the company that owns the rights to the «Putinka» brand submitted an application to Rospatent for registration of the «Putinka Ministerial» trademark.

In 2011, the company behind Putinka registered a trademark for a liquor named "Commendatore Muammer" in honor of Muammar Gaddafi.

By 2016, the brand began losing popularity, with the market share slipping from 4th to 15th among vodka brands in the Russian market in 2016.

== Commercial performance and distribution ==
«Putinka» was one of the most successful vodka brands in the second half of the 2000s in the Russian Federation, by the end of 2004 the brand entered the top three best-selling on the Russian market. During the heyday of the brand in 2004-2005, about 40 million liters of «Putinka» were sold annually.

At the end of 2010, amid falling sales of «Putinka», the brand owners decided to transfer its distribution to the Eastern European Distribution Company LLC, affiliated with the owners of the Kristall plant, but in 2011 its production collapsed by 52.9% to 1.35 million dal. In 2012 sales of «Putinka» for the first time fell below the mark of 1 million decaliters, after which in the second half of 2013 it was decided to transfer marketing management of the brand to the creator of «Putinka» Stanislav Kaufman.

According to Eastern European Distribution Company about 15 million liters of «Putinka» were sold in 2014, which provided the brand with the fourth place among the best-selling vodkas in Russia and returned «Putinka» to the TOP5 vodkas in Russia. In 2015 sales declined slightly under the onslaught of cheap «Status Group» brands - the market share was about 2.1% of the market (about 12 million liters).

From January to November 2015, according to Nielsen monitoring, «Putinka» was able to increase its market share to 2.45% in the declining vodka market. By the end of the year, in terms of sales, the brand took the 7th place among Russian vodka brands and the 4th place in its «Standard» price category (at a price of 270-310 rubles per half-liter bottle). Based on the market share, about 19 million liters of vodka were sold under this brand.

Since 2016 sales of «Putinka» have been transferred to the alcohol distributor of «Status Group». At the beginning of the year the share of «Putinka» fell to 1.45%, in April-May — to 1.36%, the brand's share collapsed from 4th to 15th place among the best-selling vodkas in Russia.

Amid the 2022 Russian invasion of Ukraine, the producer applied for registering the letters “Z" and “V”, both of which correspond to military symbols used in the war, in a request to Rospatent.

== Brand owners ==
In December 2009, Vasily Anisimov with support from VTB Bank and the VTB CEO Andrey Kostin acquired the shares of all eleven Kristall Vodka plants including the Moscow Crystal Plant from FSUE Rosspirtprom for 55 billion rubles. However, Rosspirtprom managed the plants while the FSUE and Anisimov's East European Distribution Company (EEDK) became the exclusive distributors for Rosspirtprom. Later, Anisimov sold the shares of the factories to ex-Senator Alexander Sabadash so that at the end of 2009, Anisimov owned a 51% stake in the Moscow vodka factory "Kristall" and by June 2010 he had increased his share to 86%. The 2003 established vodka Putinka has been bottle by Moscow Crystal Plant since the fall of 2009.

On September 16, 2014 the rights to the trademarks «Putinka», «Putinka pepper» and a number of other synonyms were transferred from Promimpex LLC to Real-Invest LLC. The owners of Real Invest are Cyprus offshore Ermira Consultants Limited (66.7%) and Stick LLC (33.3%). Vladislav Kopylov, the owner of the first company, is also a co-founder of the non-profit partnership «Support for Children's Sports» together with Sergey Roldugin, a musician and close friend of President Vladimir Putin. At Ermira Consultants Limited, RBC found several evidences that the offshore company, together with the Kristall plant, is connected with the structures of the Rotenberg brothers (Arkady, Boris and Igor).

In March 2016 information appeared on Rospatent's website about the conclusion of a license agreement for the use of the Putinka brand with the Alkomir company owned by billionaire Vasily Anisimov, who formerly owned the Moscow vodka factory Kristall and VEDK. According to Rospatent the agreement between Real-Invest and Alkomir was concluded on September 5, 2014, but there is no information about it in the register of registered trademarks on Rospatent's website.

Now the rights to vodka belong to the Baikal-Invest company.

== Awards ==
In 2004 the advisory Council of the Superbrand company, chaired by Alexander Shokhin, awarded «Putinka» the title of «Super-brand». In 2007 the Kashrut Department under the Chief Rabbinate of Russia issued a certificate of kosher vodka (varieties «Putinka pepper» and «Putinka limited batch»).
