= Velobike =

Moscow bicycle-sharing system

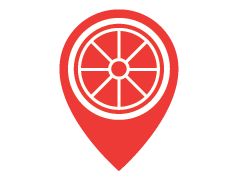

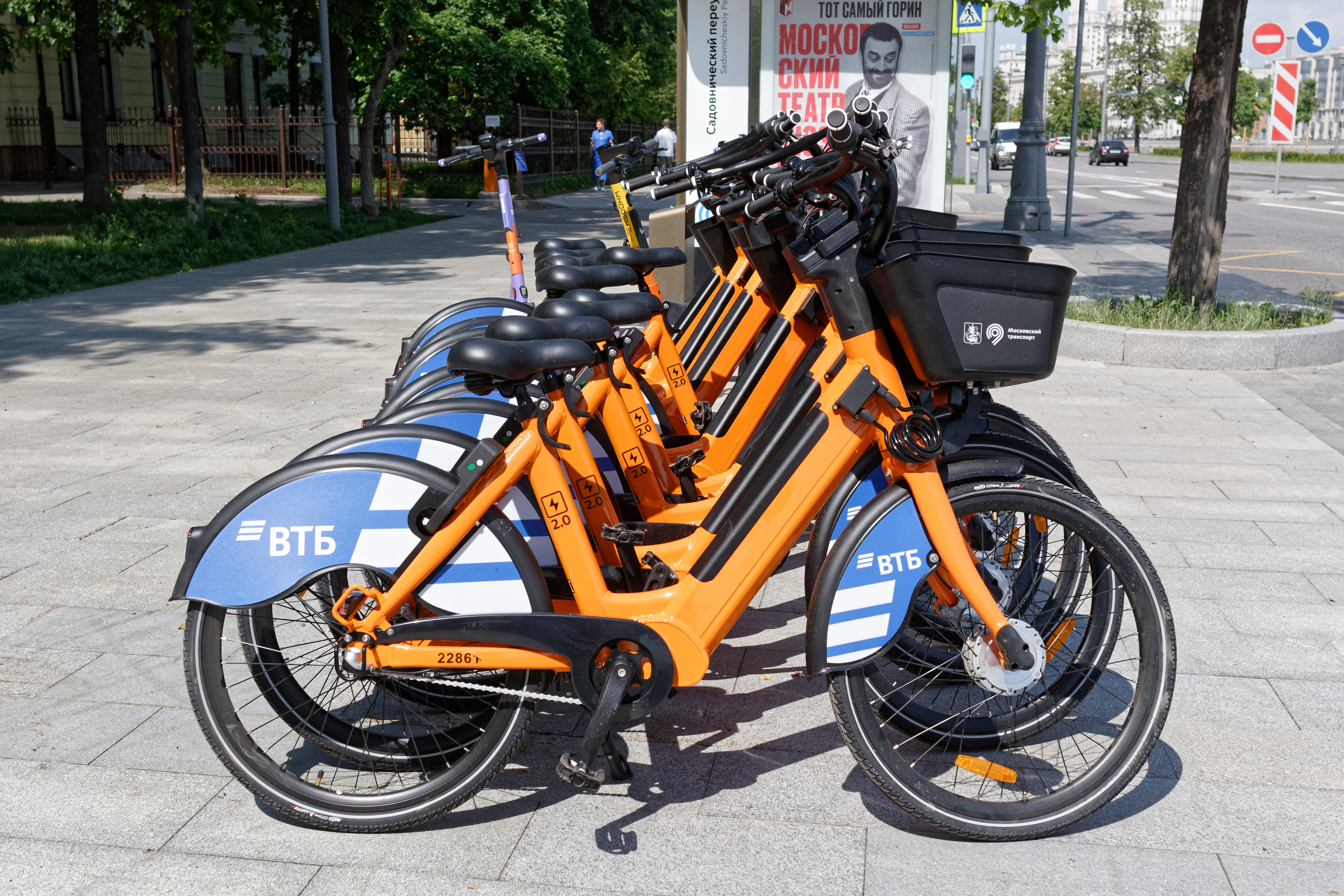
- The "2.0" dockless e-bikes

Overview
- Native name: Russian: Велобайк
- Locale: Moscow, Russia
- Transit type: Bicycle-sharing system
- Annual ridership: 4250000 (2018)
- Website: https://velobike.ru/

Operation
- Began operation: June 1, 2013; 12 years ago
- Operator(s): CityBike JSC (Russian: АО «СитиБайк»)
- Number of vehicles: 14250

Velobike (Russian: Велобайк) is a bicycle-sharing system run by the city of Moscow, Russia.

== History ==
The system was opened in 2013. In 2015 the 1st generation of the system was fully replaced by the Smoove-based solution using B’TWIN bicycles.

In 2016, e-bikes were added to the service. In 2018 e-bikes were replaced by a fleet of pedelecs.

In 2018 there were 430 parking stations in the system with 4,300 bicycles. The system had 424,736 users registered and 4,25 million trips annually.

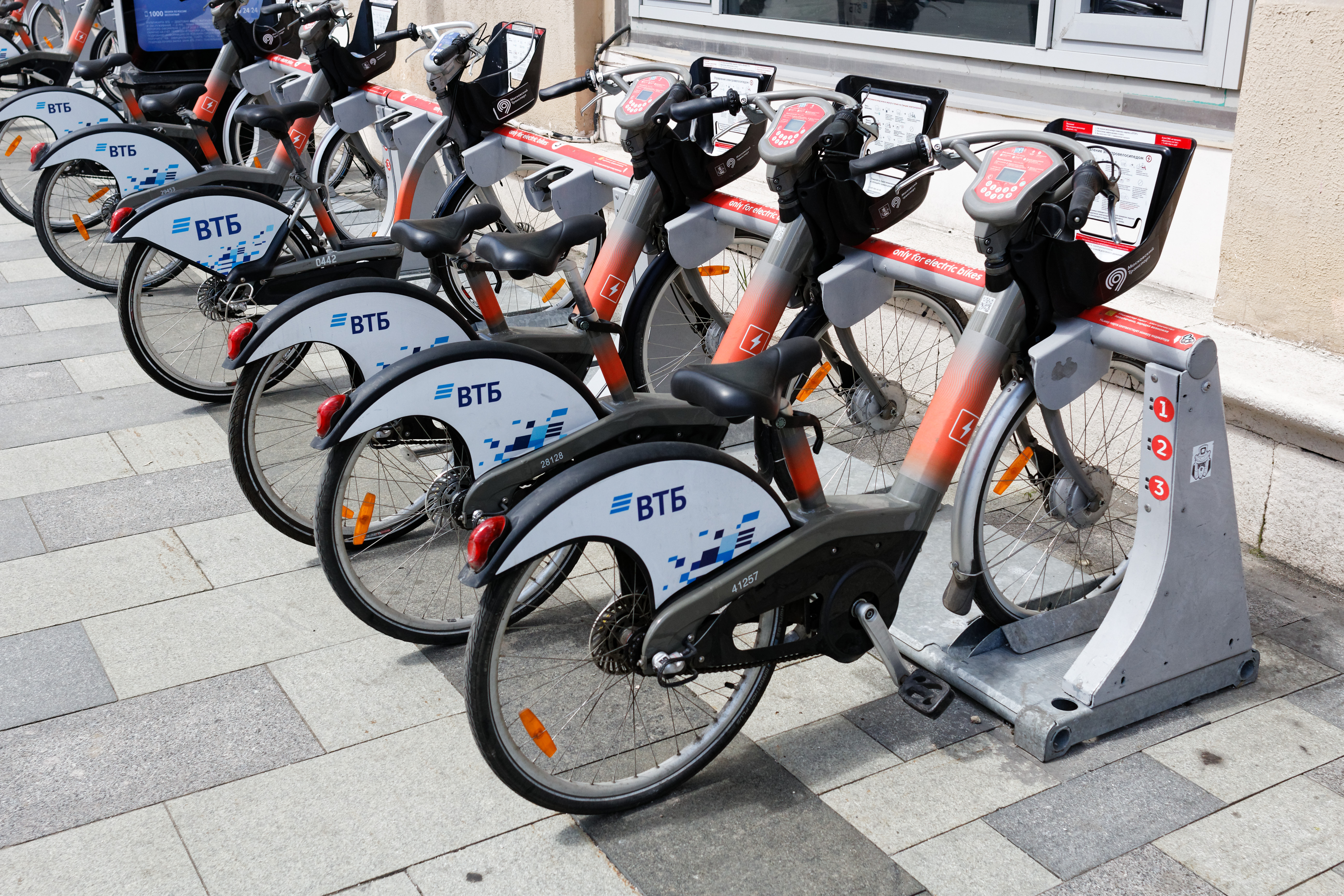
Station-based bikes by Smoove in 2022. All of them, except one, are e-bikes

In 2023, the new "2.0" e-bikes were introduced. Before 2023, Velobike operated as a docking station based system only, but with "2.0" e-bikes, it added dockless option too. The "2.0" became four times more popular than standard, station-based bikes, both e-bikes and standard bikes. As of 2023, more than 780 stations were available for users, around 10 thousand bikes were available, with 4 thousand of them being electric.

In 2025, all Smoove station-based bikes were decommissioned; Velobike has completely switched to dockless model. Instead, Velobike;

- Expanded its fleet up to nine thousand "2.0" dockless bikes;

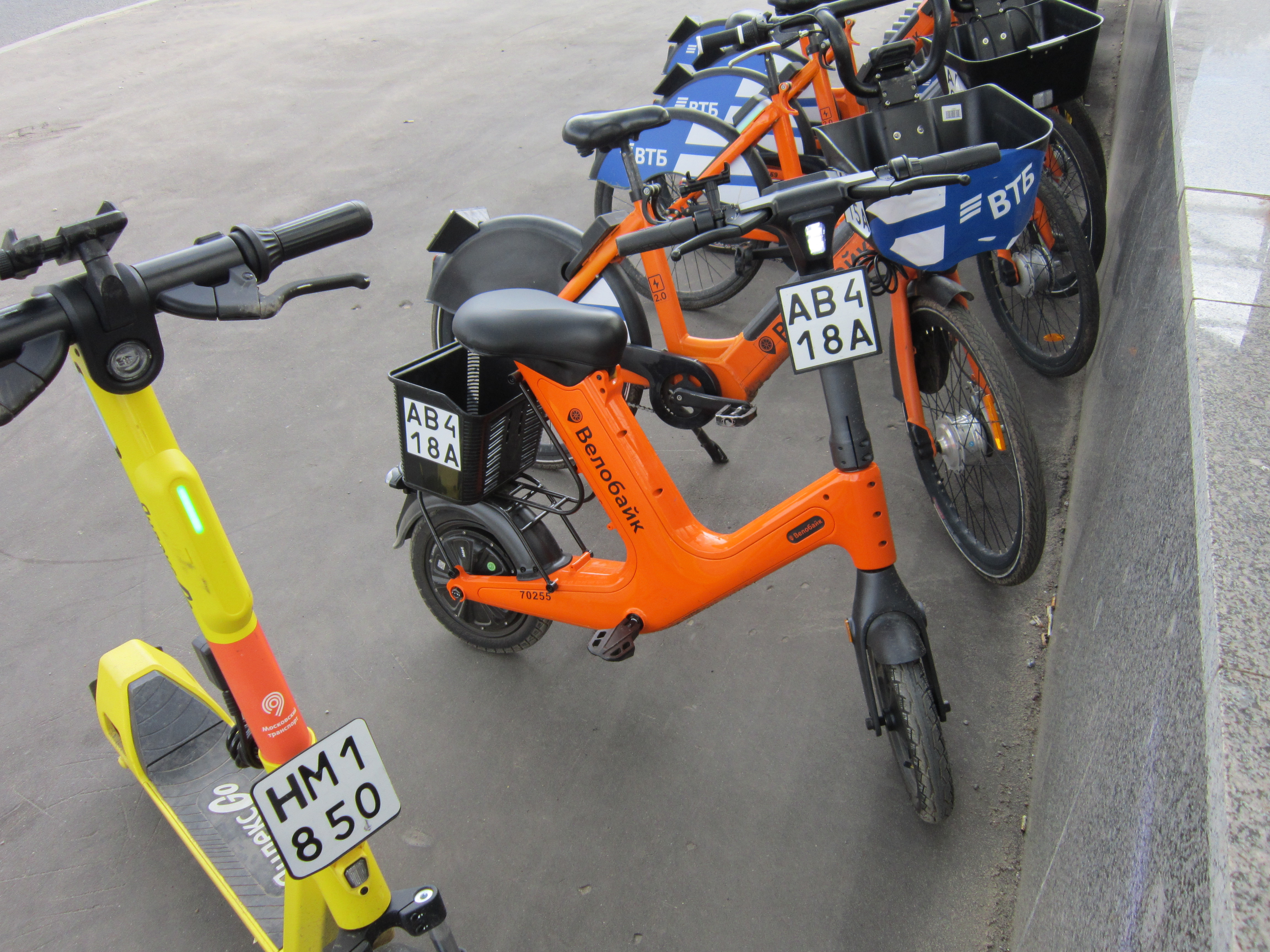
Electric scooter of Velobike

- Added scooter sharing — launched 300 electric scooters. Next year, 3,5 thousand more scooters were introduced;

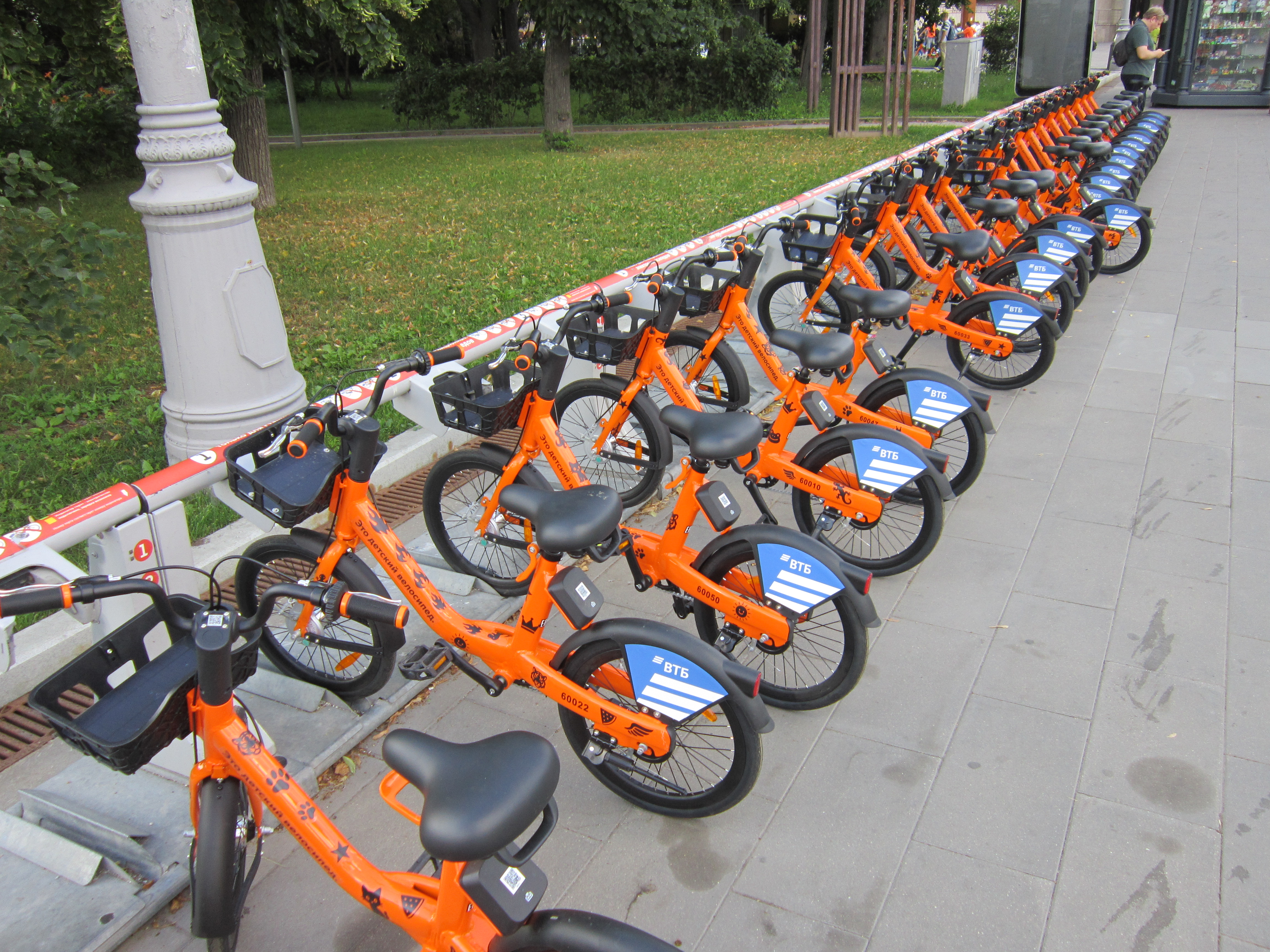
Children's bicycles

- Launched dockless non-electric bicycles — for adults and for children.

== Overview ==
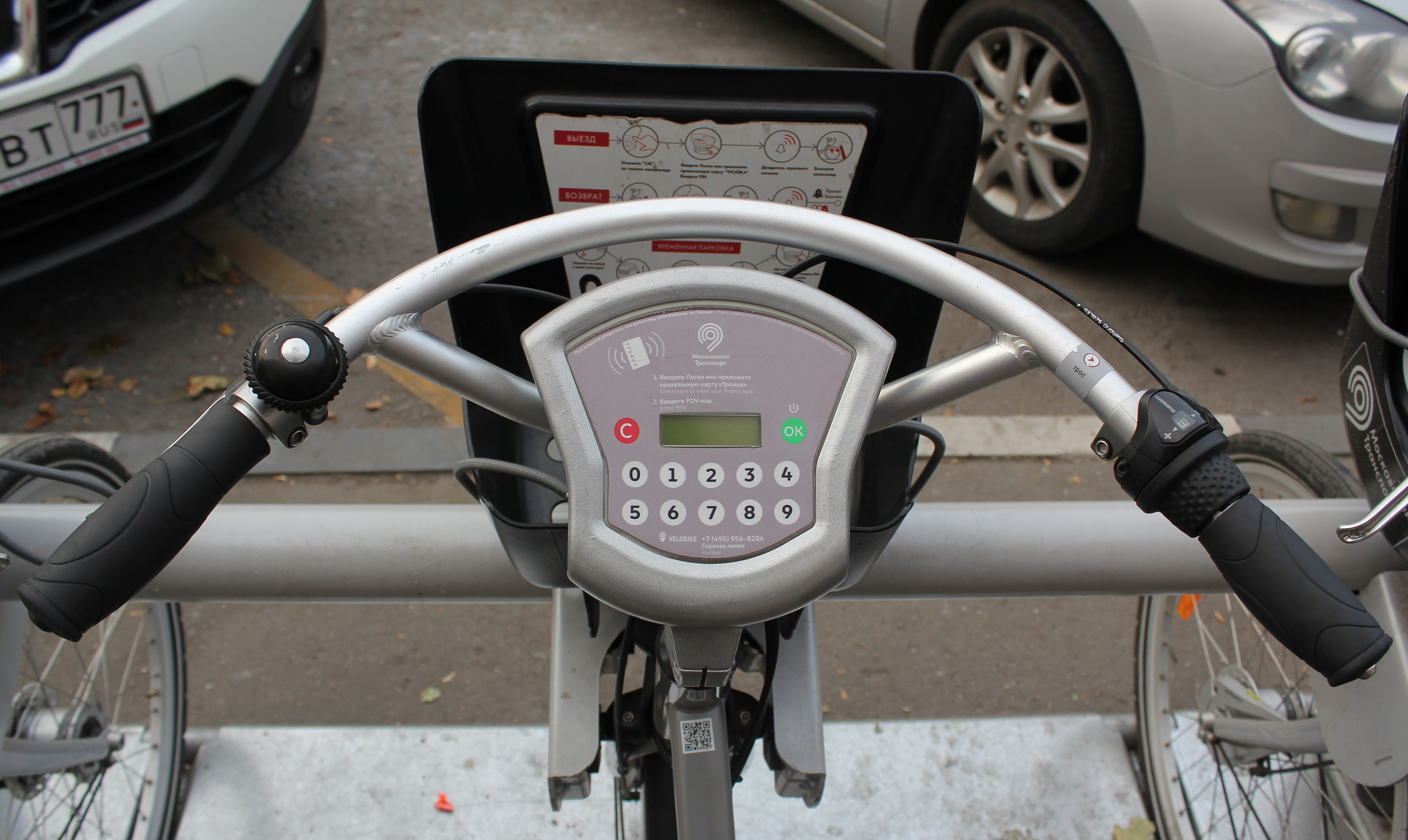
Smoove Box at the Velobike's handlebar

A user has to pay by a payment card (Visa, Mastercard, Mir) for a subscription to the system either at the web site, mobile app or the Velobike's station terminal (where available). Access to a bicycle is arranged by account number (user ID) / PIN pair. A Troika transport card can also be used instead of the account number.

The system has been sponsored by a number of Russian banks. First, by the Bank of Moscow, then by the Sberbank and later on by the VTB Bank. The capital costs are covered by a sponsor while operating costs are covered by the city.

== Subscription plans ==
User can buy subscription on day/week/month or seasonal plans to unlock savings on rides lasting one hour or less. There is an additional charge for time over the limit.

== See also ==
- Outline of cycling
- Short term hire schemes
