= Post Bank (Russia) =

Russian government owned retail bank

Pochta Bank
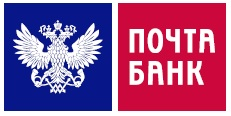
- Native name: АО «Почта Банк»
- Type: Joint-stock company
- Industry: Financial services
- Founded: 25 March 2016; 10 years ago
- Defunct: 4 May 2026
- Fate: Merged with VTB Bank
- Headquarters: Moscow, Russia
- Key people: Alexander Pakhomov, President & Chairman of the Board
- Products: Retail banking
- Owner: VTB Bank
- Website: PochtaBank.ru

JSC Post Bank (Pochta Bank pronunciation; Russian: АО «Почта Банк») was a Russian consumer bank founded on January 28, 2016, and obtained a license from the Central Bank of Russia for banking operations No. 650 on March 25, 2016. It was previously the Leto Bank ("Summer Bank"; Russian: Лето Банк) under VTB24. Prior to that, it was the "Bezhitsa-Bank" (Russian: Бежица-Банк) in Bryansk. The company's headquarters were in Moscow. The bank completed its merger process with VTB Bank on May 4, 2026 and ceased to exist.

== History ==
In 2012, lawyer Dmitry Tretyakov from Tolyatti proposed the Federal Property Management Agency to create the "VTB Post Bank of Russia Post Bank". According to Dmitry Tretyakov, his project involved the modernization of post offices at the expense of VTB Bank. Earlier, according to the lawyer, the Finnish company Itella and the French La Poste were interested in such cooperation.

On July 31, 2013, Kirill Dmitriev, who is the head of the Russian Direct Investment Fund (RDIF), sent a letter to both his close friend Kirill Shamalov, who was the son-in-law of Vladimir Putin at the time, and Ksenia Yudaeva (Russian: Ксения Юдаева), who headed the expert directorate of the President of Russia at the time. In the letter, Dmitriev had minutes of a meeting about establishing a postal bank.

July 24, 2015: Approved by Dmitry Anatolyevich Medvedev, an agreement was signed between the bank president, Director of Russian Post, Dmitry Evgenevich Strashnov, and Minister of Communications and Mass Media, Nikolay Anatolievich Nikiforov, for the Russian Post to purchase for 5 billion rubles a stake of 50% minus 1 share of Leto Bank (Summer Bank) from VTB24, with the purpose of reorganizing it into the National Post Bank. The remaining stake of 50% plus one share will be owned by VTB24, a subsidiary of VTB Bank and VTB Group. VTB CEO Andrey Leonidovich Kostin suggested appointing Dmitry Rudenko, the current head of Leto Bank, as the head of Post Bank (Russia).

January 28, 2016: a set of documents was signed between VTB24 and Russian Post on establishing the Post Bank (Russia). Russian Post purchased 50% minus 1 share of the newly established Post Bank (Russia) through its 100% subsidiary. The remaining 50% plus one share is owned by VTB24 of VTB Bank. Dmitry Rudenko, the head of Leto Bank of VTB24, became the head of Post Bank (Russia).

December 22, 2017: Post Bank (Russia) announces that President-Chairman of the Board of VTB24, Mikhail Zadornov, and the board member of VTB24, Alexander Sokolov, will step down. Both Zadornov, as chairman of the board, and Sokolov, as temporary chairman of the board until Zadornov arrives, become members of the management board of Otkritie FC Bank. Post Bank (Russia) announces that the president and chairman of the board of VTB Bank, Andrey Kostin, as well as senior vice-presidents of VTB Bank, Dmitry Pianov and Vladimir Levykin, will be placed on Post Bank (Russia) supervisory board.

December 27, 2017: VTB's supervisory board sells to Post Bank (Russia) a 74.7% stake in the limited liability company Multicard, MultiCard, or MultiKarta (Russian: МультиКарта) "with a par value of 112,420,993 rubles at a price not lower than the market price."

December 28, 2017: VTB24 sells two shares to Dmitry Rudenko, the chairman of the board of Post Bank (Russia). VTB 24 and Russia Post have equal shares in Post Bank (Russia): each have 50% minus one share.

January 1, 2018: VTB transfers VTB24 fully into VTB Bank.

In October 2021 Post Bank sold the Multicard company to T1 Group. Since 2022, Post Bank has been headed by Alexander Pakhomov, former principal of network and retail business unit of Otkritie FC Bank.

== Sanctions ==
Placed upon the parent banks of Post Bank (Russia) are sanctions to the VTB Group and its subsidiaries. These sanctions also apply to Post Bank (Russia) upon its formation in 2016.

July 29, 2014: the Office of Foreign Assets Control (OFAC) published that “the VTB Group”, VTB Bank OAO, which is the second-largest bank in Russia, together with its subsidiaries, the Bank of Moscow through its parent bank, VTB Bank OAO, VTB24, and other entities under its ownership have been added to the Specially Designated Nationals List (SDN). This freezes the assets in the United States of VTB, VTB Global, Bank of Moscow, and other entities; and blocks any United States citizen or entities from conducting business with VTB, VTB Global, Bank of Moscow, and other entities.

July 31, 2014: VTB was added to the European Union sanctions list due to its role in the annexation of Crimea by the Russian Federation. VTB assets and its subsidiaries in the EU have to be frozen.

August 27, 2014: VTB Bank, VTB24, and VTB Group and their subsidiaries as well as all Russian financial institutions are under sanctions in Switzerland because of Russian interference in Ukraine.

December 22, 2015: United States imposed additional sanctions on VTB Bank and its subsidiaries. In November 2023 the Post Bank was sanctioned by the U.S. Department of the Treasury’s Office of Foreign Assets Control (OFAC) under E.O. 14024 for operating or having operated in the financial services sector of the Russian Federation economy.

March 15, 2017: Ukraine imposed sanctions against VTB Bank and subsidiaries because of the ongoing Russian interference in Ukraine.

== Shareholders ==
As of January 28, 2016, its only two shareholders were VTB24 (Russian: ВТБ 24) 50% plus one share and Russian Post (Russian: Почта России, Pochta Rossii) 50% minus one share.

In December 2017, VTB sold two shares in Post Bank (~0,000012%) to its president, Dmitry Rudenko, formally reducing its stake below 50% to protect the subsidiary bank from sanctions.

In September 2021, before Rudenko stepped down as president of Postbank, VTB regained control. VTB management at that moment considered that the risk of sanctions had decreased.

In February 2022, VTB again sold two shares of Post Bank to its president, this time to Alexander Pakhomov. Now both majority shareholders have less than 50 percent of the shares.

== MultiCard ==
From December 2017 to October 2021, Post-Bank owned a majority stake of a 74.7% in the limited liability company Multicard, MultiCard, or MultiKarta (Russian: МультиКарта) "Multicard" represents a wide range of high-tech services for companies of the banking industry: processing and personalization of plastic cards of all major international payment systems, ATM network service, cross-selling in online channels, geolocation, and many other solutions. Currently, the company owned by T1 Group and provides services to more than 60 Russian and foreign banks.

=== History ===
Established in 1994 in Moscow, the limited liability company MultiCard (Russian: ООО «МультиКарта») received certification in the late 1990s as a third party payment system to interact with the international payment systems of Visa, Europay International, MasterCard, American Express, and Diners Club. In October 2014, Multicard met the requirements for the federal law #161-fz dated June 27, 2011, "On the National Payment System". Following the order #1306-r dated July 15, 2014, for the Bank of Russia to create nationally significant payment systems in Russia, MultiCard which is the payment processing system for VTB24 of the VTB Group met the security requirements in March 2015 and did not have to transfer its processing to the National System for Payment Cards (NSPC) (Russian: Национальная система платёжных карт ОАО «НСПК»). As of March 2018, MuliCard provides processing for the VTB Group, VTB Bank, and Post Bank.

In October 2021 Post Bank sold the Multicard company to T1 Group.

=== Sanctions ===
On December 22, 2015, the United States under EO13662 placed MultiCard (Note: For the United States Sectoral Sanctions List, MultiCard was named as MULTICARTA (a.k.a. MULTICARTA, LTD; a.k.a. MULTIKARTA, OOO; a.k.a. OBSHCHESTVO S OGRANICHENNOI OTVETSTVENNOSTYU MULTIKARTA), d. 43 korp. 1 ul. Vorontsovskaya, Moscow 109147, Russia; Website www.multicarta.ru) on the United States Treasury Department's Office of Foreign Assets Control (OFAC) Sectoral Sanctions Identifications List which prohibits United States citizens, companies, or other entities from investing in MultiCard or conducting business with MultiCard and freezes any of MultiCard's assets in the United States.

== See also ==
- RTK-Leasing
