= Moscow Distillery Crystal =

Liquor distillery in Russia

- Type: Joint-stock company
- Location: Moscow, Russia
- Opened: 24 June 1901
- Parent: Dialog LLC
- Website: www.kristall.ru

Joint-Stock Company Moscow Distillery Crystal (Russian: Открытое акционерное общество "Московский завод «Кристалл», lit. 'Okrytkoye aktsionernoye obshchestvo 'Moskovsky zavod "Kristall"'), formerly known as Moscow State Wine Warehouse No. 1, is a distillery in Moscow, Russia, known for producing traditional Russian vodka. Founded in 1901 as a state-sanctioned distillery, Kristall is the largest liquor and vodka enterprise in Russia, and is best known internationally as the birthplace of the Stolichnaya vodka brand.

== History ==
In 1896, by decree of the Minister of Finance of the Russian Empire, Sergei Yulevich Vitte, a state monopoly on the production and sale of alcoholic beverages was introduced.

On June 24, 1901, Moscow State Wine Warehouse No. 1 was founded as a state-sanctioned vodka and wine distillery in Moscow, located on the banks of the Yauza River in the east of the city. The distillery employed 1,500 people and was planned to produce 600,000 state vodka buckets per year, however, only a week after opening plans were made to expand production due to unexpectedly high demand, and instead produced 2,100,000 (approximately 2.6 million decalitres) in its first year of operation. At the beginning, production was divided among three quality divisions, from lowest to highest quality: "simple", "improved", and "boyarskaya".

From October 31, 1914, due to Russia's participation in the First World War, the distillery's production was cut down and was closed to the civilian market because of a dry law, while production continued for the military, foreign market, and medical applications. A military hospital was situated for some time in the unused areas of the distillery building. Due to the collapse of the Russian Empire and the rise of the Bolsheviks to power, it was not until 1923 that pre-war production was restored at the distillery as a state-owned enterprise of the Soviet Union. By January 1, 1924, the distillery had produced 844,720 litres of vodka.

During the Second World War, in addition to vodka production, the distillery also produced "Molotov cocktail" weapons for the Soviet war effort. The distillery was severely damaged by a German bomb on July 22, 1941, igniting flammable products in the building, but despite the heavy damage production continued. For contributions during the war, the distillery was awarded the Banner of the State Defense Committee.

In January 1987, the distillery received its current name, Moscow Distillery Crystal. In 1993, following the dissolution of the Soviet Union, the distillery became a private joint-stock company and the Moscow Distillery Kristall name trade mark were registered.

In 2002 the Kristall plant signed an agreement with the Estonian Onistar plant for the production of beverages under its own brands. The plant produced vodka «Embassy», «Gzhelka", «Golden Ring» and «Old Moscow».

In the 2010s vodka was bottled at the plant for Kristall-Lefortovo (Old Moscow and Festive brands) and the Eastern European Distribution Company VEDK (brands «Putinka», «Dvoynaya», 30.4%). The most famous brands of the plant are vodka «Putinka», «CRISTALL Golden Ring», «Moskovskaya Kristall», «Stary Arbat», «Golden Ring» and others.

In 2013 the plant stopped production due to the transfer of the enterprise to the Korystovo branch. The production lines were stopped on May 15. Before that the Korystovo branch was launched at full capacity — according to 2013 it produced 7 million decaliters (dal) of vodka per year. In connection with the move, the plant stopped producing products of the companies Kristall-Lefortovo («Old Moscow» and «Prazdnichnaya») and Kazenka («Kazenka» vodka).

In 2014 the territory of the plant was planned to be transformed into an urban quarter, with its own infrastructure, offices, workshops, lofts, sports and educational areas. In 2015 the redevelopment project was frozen due to lack of funding.

== Financial performance ==
| Year | Proceeds from sales, billion rubles | Net profit, million rubles | Loss, million rubles | Production volume, million dal |
|---|---|---|---|---|
| 2000 | 3,06 | 319,5 | — | — |
| 2001 | 3,89 | 662,8 | — | 10,4 |
| 2002 | 3,9 | 361,1 | — | 10,9 |
| 2003 | — | более 250 | — | 8,1 |
| 2004 | — | — | — | 8,5 |
| 2005 | — | — | — | 9 |
| 2006 | 3,5 | 123,72 | — | 7,4 |
| 2007 | 5,2 | 359,4 | — | 10,2 |
| 2008 | 4,9 | 157,7 | — | 9,4 |
| 2009 | 4,33 | 137,7 | — | 8,5 |
| 2010 | 5,1 | 266 | — | 9,78 |
| 2011 | 5,6 | 188 | — | 9,7 |
| 2012 | 5,5 | 14,93 | — | 8,3 |
| 2013 | 2,19 | 16,09 | — | 2,8 |
| 2014 | — | — | — | 1,7 |
| 2015 | 0,421 | — | 281,8 | — |
| 2016 | 1,5 | 5,6 | — | 2,9 |
| 2017 | 1,6 | 1,3 | 48,1 | — |
| 2018 | 1,66 | 19,5 | — | — |
| 2019 | 2,54 | 157,96 | — | 0,89 |
| 2020 | 1,18 | 0,461 | — | 0,59 |
| 2021 | 0,621 | 0,421 | — | — |
| 2022 | 0,157 | 3,47 | — | — |
| 2023 | 0,140 | 0,937 | — | — |

== Directors ==
On May 26, 2000 by decision of the Board of Directors, CEO Yuri Ermilov was dismissed. He was replaced by Alexander Romanov, former vice president of Rosneft. Already in November 2000, his position was transferred to Sergei Lukashuk, who was ousted on April 2, 2001. Alexander Timofeev took over the post of General Director by decision of the Board of Directors of the plant. On August 12, 2002 he was replaced by Alexander Romanov.

On August 12, 2005 Igor Kriskovets was appointed CEO. In 2007 his position was transferred to Igor Olegovich Alyoshin. In 2008 Roman Malyshev took over the post, who was replaced by Apoyan Ara Rubikovich on March 31, 2021. He left the position five months later. In 2023 Evgeny Igorevich Zheleznov is the general director of the plant.

86% of the shares of Kristall as of November 2010 belonged to entrepreneur Vasily Anisimov, co-owner of Coalco construction holding and Metalloinvest mining holding. His stake is under the operational management of FSUE Rosspirtprom. About 9% of the company's shares are controlled by individuals.

== Operation ==
The company mainly specialized in bottling vodkas by order of other companies. Thus the most important customer (52.1% of the output) was the Kristall-Lefortovo company («Old Moscow» and «Prazdnichnaya» vodka were produced by its order), and significant volumes of products were also produced for the VEDK company owned by Vasily Anisimov («Putinka», «Dvoynaya» brands; 30.4%). In addition «Kazenka vodka was bottled by order of the company of the same name. Among the company's own brands are vodka «Chistiy Kristall», «Privet», their output was small. In 2018 the plant received the rights to manage the «Putinka» vodka brand.

For a long time the Kristall plant was the leader in terms of vodka production in the Russian Federation, in particular, in 2011 it produced 9.1 million dal of products, and in 2012, due to the beginning of the transfer of production facilities to the Moscow region, it lost first place and reduced production to 7 million dal. The company's turnover is not disclosed, according to expert estimates, revenue in 2006 amounted to 10 billion rubles.
