= Vozrozhdenie Bank =

Bank of Russia

- Company type: Joint-stock company
- Traded as: MCX: VZRZ
- Industry: Financial services
- Founded: 1991; 35 years ago
- Headquarters: Moscow, Russia
- Key people: Dmitry Orlov (Was founder, Chairman and CEO)
- Products: Banking
- Revenue: ▼US$ 269.9 million (2010)
- Net income: ▼US$ 18.5 million (2010)
- Total assets: ▲US$ 5.7 billion (2010)
- Owner: VTB Bank
- Number of employees: 41,992 (2017)
- Rating: B1 (Moody's), BB− (S&P) (2017)
- Website: www.vbank.ru

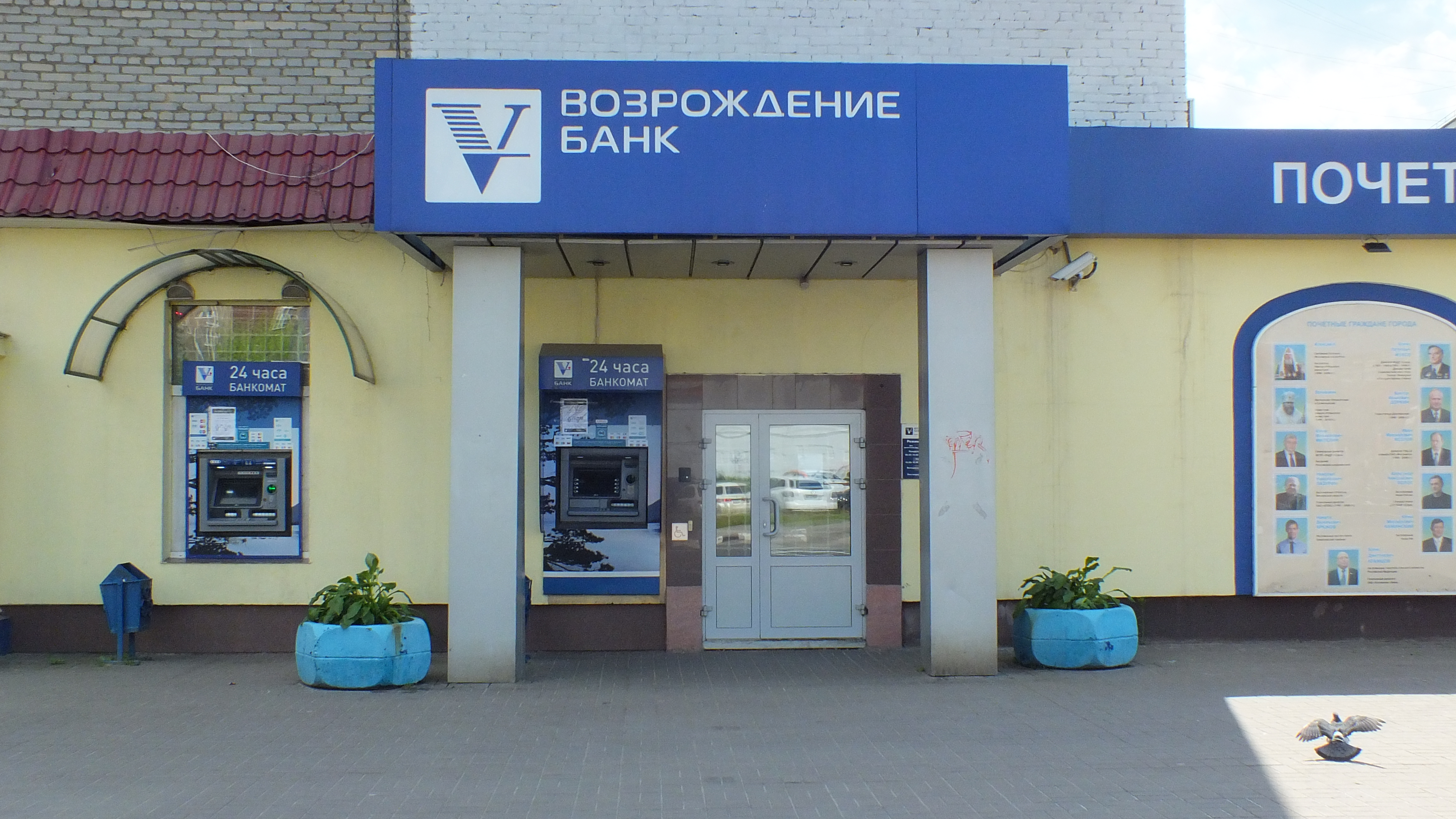
Bank in Dzerzhinsky, Moscow Oblast in 2020.

Vozrozhdenie Bank was a Russian bank founded in 1991 and headquartered in Moscow. It provided personal banking and business services to clients in Russia.

In 2021 it was acquired by VTB Bank.
