= Sergey Beseda =

Russian politician, Colonel General and government agent

- Сергей Беседа

Head of the 5th Service of the FSB - Service of Operational Information and International Relations
- In office 2009–2024
- Preceded by: Viktor Komogorov
- Succeeded by: Aleksey Komkov

Personal details
- Born: Sergey Orestovich Beseda; 17 May 1954 (age 72) Soviet Union
- Children: 3 sons

Military service
- Allegiance: Russia
- Branch/service: Federal Security Service
- Rank: Colonel General

Sergey Orestovich Beseda (Russian: Сергей Орестович Беседа; born on 17 May 1954) is a Russian politician, Colonel General and government agent who headed the Fifth Service (Service of Operational Information and International Relations) of Russia's Federal Security Service (FSB) internal intelligence agency from 2009 to June 2024.

In March 2022, during the first month of Russia's invasion of Ukraine, international media reported that Beseda was being held under house arrest as a consequence of giving Russian President Vladimir Putin erroneous intelligence on unexpectedly strong Ukrainian resistance to the invasion. On 8 April, Beseda was reportedly transferred to Moscow's Lefortovo Prison, but Russian authorities provided no official confirmation of any of these events and in August The Washington Post cast doubt on reports that Beseda had been removed from his leadership role at the FSB. He finally left office in the summer of 2024, when he became advisor to the Director of the FSB.

== Early life ==
Sergey Beseda was born on 17 May 1954.

== Career ==
In 2003, Beseda was named FSB Deputy Head of Department - Head of the Directorate for Coordination of Operational Information of the Department of Analysis, Forecast and Strategic Planning. The following year, he became Deputy Head of Service - Head of the Operational Information Department of the Forecast Analysis and Strategic Planning Service.

=== Chiefship of the FSB Fifth Service ===
In 2009, Beseda became the chief FSB Operational Information and International Relations Service (Fifth Service), formally replacing Viktor Komogorov in January 2010.

On 4 March 2010, when the Russian Interdepartmental Commission on the country's participation in the G8 was transformed into the Interdepartmental Commission on Russia's participation in both the G8 and G20, Beseda was included in the commission as representative of the FSB.

=== On the ground in Ukraine (2014) ===
On 20 and 21 February 2014, during the Ukrainian Maidan Revolution and shortly before the fall of President Viktor Yanukovych, Beseda was in Kyiv and in contact with the Security Service of Ukraine (SBU), officially tasked with determining the required level of protection for the Russian Embassy and other Russian institutions in the capital. Beseda asked for a meeting with President Yanukovich on the matter, but the request was rejected. On 4 April, during pre-trial investigation of the numerous killings of Ukrainian protesters in Kyiv from 18 to 22 February, the Ukrainian Ministry of Foreign Affairs asked Russia to clarify the circumstances of Beseda's stay in Ukraine.

On 6 October 2014, Beseda signed an agreement on the mutual protection of classified information with Goran Matić, Director of Serbia's National Security Council and the Protection of Secret Information.

=== Sanctions ===
On 26 July 2014, Beseda was included on the European Union's list of International sanctions during the Russo-Ukrainian War.

He was sanctioned by the UK government in 2014 in relation to the Russo-Ukrainian War.

=== Reports of arrest ===
Amid President Putin's discontent with intelligence failures over the invasion of Ukraine which began on 24 February 2022, on 11 March investigative journalist Andrei Soldatov reported that Beseda and his deputy Anatoly Bolyukh were under house arrest.

As of 18 March, the Russian embassy had not responded to requests for comment on the report, but a U.S. official interviewed by The Wall Street Journal described the arrest report as "credible".

On 11 April, The Times of London reported that Beseda had been transferred to the infamous Lefortovo Prison, scene of mass executions during Stalin's purges. Soldatov speculated that Russian authorities suspected Beseda of having passed information to the CIA, amid reports afoot that Putin had purged 150 FSB careerists.

On 19 August, however, The Washington Post said that U.S. and other intelligence communities doubted that Beseda had been demoted or imprisoned, quoting "a senior US official" as saying, "We have pretty good reason to believe that he’s still in the job."

In January 2023, he was seen in Moscow at a public event, and is believed to have been likely released from house arrest.

On 11 October 2023, according to the message of the head of the State Government Kyrylo Budanov, "Beseda continues to perform his official duties."

=== Prisoner exchange ===
Prior to June 2024, Sergey Beseda headed the Russian side of the negotiations that later led to the 2024 Ankara prisoner exchange; however, in June 2024, Vladimir Putin replaced Beseda with Aleksey Komkov. (Note: Alexey Komkov (Russian: Алексей Комков) was the head of the FSB Internal Security Directorate from September 2016 after the 8 July 2016 resignation of the former head of the FSB Internal Security Directorate Sergey Borisovich Korolev, which vacated the chair of Korolev in the CSS, because Korolev was promoted to the post of head of the Economic Security Service of the FSB of Russia. Alexey Komkov headed the FSB Internal Security Directorate until 2018 when he was transferred to the FSB Counterintelligence Service. Komkov is a protégé of Sergey Korolev) The Vice President of Germany's BND Philipp Wolff (Note: Philipp Wolff (born 1972, Gräfelfing) was the Vice President for Central Tasks (German: Vizepräsident für zentrale Aufgaben) of Germany's BND since 1 November 2022 when he replaced Michael Baumann after the BND restructured during 2022.) also joined the negotiations at this time.

=== Delegations for peace talks ===
On 24 March 2025, Beseda, along with Senator Grigory Karasin headed the experts delegation from Russia at negotiations with the United States in Riyadh.

== Family ==
Beseda has three sons, Anton, Aleksey, (Note: Aleksey Beseda (born 1983 or 1984) was the general director of ZAO Business Sphere (Russian: ЗАО «Бизнес сфера») from 2008 to 2009 and, in January 2013, became a member of the board of directors of OJSC AvtoVAZagregat (Russian: ОАО «АвтоВАЗагрегат») which is a major supplier to AvtoVAZ. The firm "Business Sphere" has the same phone number as Coalco which is associated with Vasily Anisimov. In 2013, the Coalco telephone secretary confirmed that Beseda was the former head of "Business Sphere". In 2013, he owned a plot at Akulinino which is, similar to Rublyovka, an elitist enclave of 18,000 hectares (44,000 acres) located 30 kilometres (19 mi) from Moscow on Kashirskoye Highway (Russian: Каширское шоссе).) and Aleksandr.
