= Dmitry Orlov (banker) =

Russian banker

- Born: July 2, 1943; Sukhumi, Soviet Union
- Died: December 5, 2014 (aged 71); Moscow, Russia
- Education: Moscow Institute of Finance
- Occupation: banker
- Known for: Chairman of the Management Board of Vozrozhdenie Bank
- Children: 2

External image
- Dmitry Orlov in 2012. Photo by Roman Shelomenev for Forbes

Dmitry Lvovich Orlov (in Russian: Дмитрий Львович Орлов; 1943–2014) was a Russian banker who was the founder, main shareholder and Chairman of Vozrozhdenie Bank.

== Early life and education ==
In 1968, he graduated from the Moscow Institute of Finance.

== Career ==
In the 1970s, Orlov started work as a senior credit inspector in the Krasnogorsk department of State bank of the Soviet Union. In 1980, he became the manager in the Mytishchi branch of the State Bank. In 1986, he became manager of the Moscow Regional Office of the State Bank.

In 1987, he became the head of the Moscow Regional Department of the Soviet Union's Agroprombank. Also, in 1987, Dmitry became the head of the Moscow Regional Department of the Agroprombank of the USSR. When corporatizing in 1991, Vozrozhdenie Bank appeared on the basis of management. By the mid-1990s, after privatization and several additional issues, Dmitry collected a blocking stake and began to build a classic commercial bank. The strategy was conservative: settlement services, loans, and deposits for medium and small enterprises and their employees.

From 1991 to June 2012, he headed the Vozrozhdenie Bank, holding the position of Chairman of the Management Board of the bank. In 1997, the bank placed ADRs on three foreign sites at once so that Western analysts and investors would know about it. In early 2008, Dmitry refused a deal to sell the bank to BNP Paribas.

== Later life and death ==
In his later life Dmitry was a member of the Banking Council under the Government of the Russian Federation, a member of the Advisory Board of the Association of Banks of Russia, a member of Russia's Economic Council, and the chairman of the board of trustees of the Financial University under the Government of the Russian Federation. Dmitry was referred to as the Patriarch of the Russian banking market.

Dmitry Orlov died on December 5, 2014. His wife and two children survived him; both worked at the Vozrozhdenie Bank. In the summer of 2015, the Orlov’s heirs sold their shares in the bank to Promsvyazbank, owned by the Ananyev brothers. Nikolai Orlov completely resigned from the bank's shareholders in June 2017.

== Recognition ==
- Honored Economist of the Russian Federation (September 23, 2002).
- He was recognized as the Best Banking Chairman of the Board, Russia 2014 by Global Banking & Finance Review information portal.
- In August 2018, a book dedicated to Dmitry Orlov was published in the “Economic Chronicle of Russia” series.
