= Nailya Asker-zade =

Russian journalist (born 1987)

- Наиля Аскер-заде
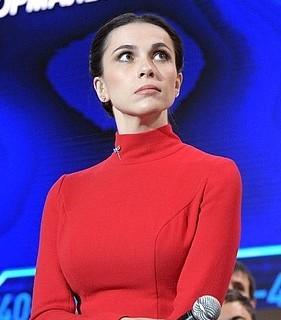
- Asker-zade in 2017
- Born: 13 December 1987 (age 38); Baku, Azerbaijani SSR, Soviet Union
- Occupations: Journalist, television presenter

Nailya Vagif kyzy Asker-zade (Note: Russian: Наиля Вагиф кызы Аскер-заде; Azerbaijani: Nailə Vaqif qızı Əsgərzadə) (born 13 December 1987 in Baku) is a Russian journalist and television presenter of Azerbaijani descent. She works for the All-Russia State Television and Radio Broadcasting Company (VGTRK).

In 2019, the Anti-Corruption Foundation, a non-profit organization founded by the late Russian opposition leader Alexei Navalny, published an investigation into Asker-zade's finances, alleging her use of a US$60 million private jet and a US$62 million yacht. Asker-zade responded on Instagram by thanking the foundation for its "native advertising".

The United Kingdom and Canada sanctioned Asker-zade for her work with the VGTRK after the 2022 Russian invasion of Ukraine.
