= VTB Bank =

Russian state-owned bank

PJSC VTB Bank

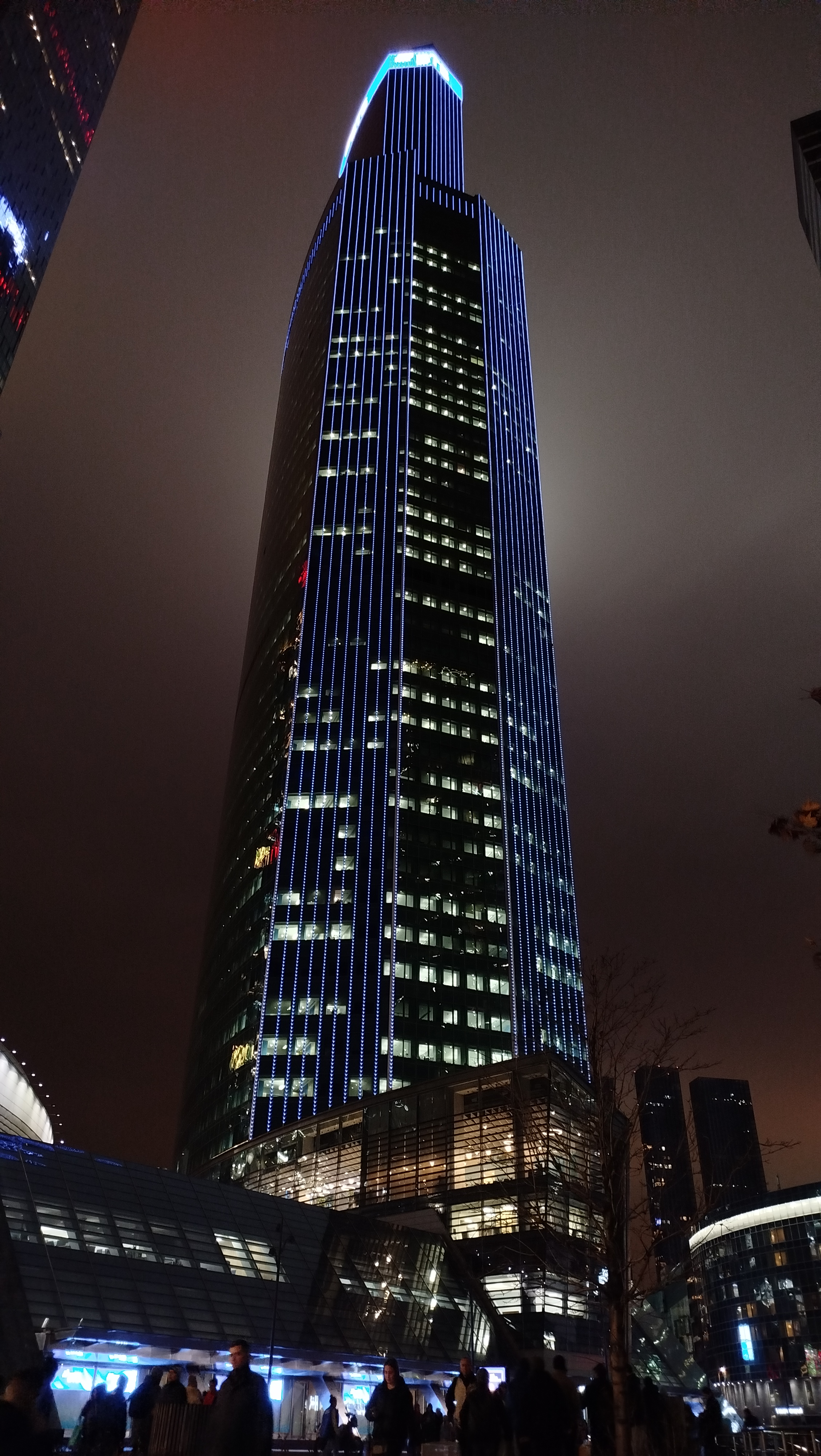
- Native name: ПАО Банк ВТБ
- Romanized name: PAO Bank VTB
- Type: Open joint-stock company
- Traded as: MCX: VTBR; LSE: VTBR
- Industry: Financial services
- Founded: October 1990; 36 years ago
- Headquarters: Moscow, Russia
- Area served: Russia, CIS, Europe, Asia, Africa, US
- Key people: Andrey L. Kostin (President and Chairman of the Management Board); Anton Siluanov (Chairman of the Supervisory Council)
- Products: Retail banking; corporate banking; investment banking; insurance; private banking; private equity; mortgage loans; credit cards; investment management; wealth management; asset management; mutual funds; exchange-traded funds; index funds
- Revenue: 1,185,800,000,000 Russian ruble (2017)
- Net income: $5.89 billion (2025)
- Total assets: $433 billion (2025)
- Total equity: $32 billion (2025)
- Owner: Federal Agency for State Property Management (60.9%)
- Website: vtb.com

VTB Bank (Russian: Банк ВТБ; formerly known as Vneshtorgbank, Внешторгбанк, lit. 'International Trade Bank') is a Russian majority state-owned bank headquartered in various federal districts of Russia; its legal address is registered as Saint Petersburg. As of 2022, over 90% of the company's capital stock was owned by three Russian agencies.

VTB Bank and its subsidiaries form VTB Group – a leading Russian financial group uniting VTB banks located in different countries and offering a wide range of corporate banking services and products in Russia, CIS, Europe, Asia, Africa, and the US. As of April 2025, VTB had a Chinese subsidiary which operated a branch in Shanghai.

VTB was ranked 446th on the FT Global 500 in 2011. The Financial Times’ annual snapshot of the world's largest companies. It climbed to 210th in the ranking of the 500 largest companies in Europe, the FT Europe 500 2014, and to 127th in the FT Emerging 500 2014, the list of the 500 largest companies in the world's emerging markets. VTB Bank (PJSC) has 22 branches and 3 representative offices in 13 regions of Russia and 4 foreign countries.

== History ==
=== 20th century ===
Old logo

VTB Bank was founded as Vneshtorgbank in 1990 with the support of the Central Bank of Russia and the Ministry of Finance. It was set up as a limited liability company to service Russia's foreign trade operations and promote Russia's integration into the world economy.

=== 21st century ===
==== 1st decade ====
In 2004, the bank acquired a majority stake of 85.8% in Guta Bank, which was reorganised into a retail bank, Vneshtorgbank 24 (VTB24). The bank also acquired the Armenian Armsberbank, which was later renamed VTB Armenia. In 2005, the bank acquired 75% plus three shares of the Promstroybank (PSB), which was reorganised as Bank VTB North-West and later became VTB's North-Western Regional Centre, and bought the Ukrainian bank Mriya, which was later merged with VTB Bank (Ukraine).

In 2007, the bank set up a subsidiary in Angola known as VTB África. The bank also took over Slavneftebank in Belarus and later renamed it VTB Belarus. In June, VTB became the first Russian bank to offer an initial public offering (IPO), raising $8 billion in what became the largest international banking IPO at the time.

In 2008, the bank acquired a 51% stake in AF Bank in Azerbaijan from AF Holding International, later renaming it VTB Azerbaijan. In 2010, the bank's board approved the phased acquisition of TransCreditBank from Russian Railways. In 2013, VTB carried out a secondary public offering (SPO) which raised 102.5 billion rubles ($3.3 billion) and diluted the Russian government's share in VTB from 75.5 percent to 60.9 percent. In 2022, VTB Bank extended a 630 billion ruble ($11.06 billion) credit line to be used for the purchase, repair and modernisation of the country's railway infrastructure.

==== 2nd decade ====
In 2011, VTB invested more than $191 million for shares in the Isle of Man company DST Investment 3 which was roughly than half of the funds in Yuri Milner's DST Global. This led to Milner's large stake in Twitter. Kanton had almost no investment in Twitter. DST Investment 3 also issued shares to Alisher Usmanov's Kanton that were used to support the Kremlin's investment in Facebook.

In November 2012, some bankers expressed concern about VTB's offer to raise capital for the Basel III requirements, which were addressed by selling $1 billion of perpetual Tier 1 bonds. As of April 2025, the $551 million worth of bonds have a call date of 6 June 2025.

On 7 May 2014, VTB transferred most of its DST Investment 3 to Kanton. In 2014, before the Russo-Ukrainian war, VTB Bank was one of the biggest banks in Ukraine. VTB Ukraine went bankrupt in 2018. Since 2014, the bank has been subject to political sanctions (see separate section below).

In 2017, VTB stated that implementing Basel III capital requirements would cost it $233 million annually. At the time, the Russian central bank was "gradually adopting" Basel III for its domestic banking system. In August 2018, it was announced that VTB Bank would acquire a 75% stake in Vozrozhdenie Bank after its previous owners oversaw a "major banking collapse". In September 2018, Kostin requested that the Russian central bank "revise" the Basel III capital requirements, which, by 2019, would amount to over $6 billion in regulatory expenses for his bank. In November 2018, the National Bank of Ukraine declared the Ukrainian subsidiary of VTB Bank insolvent due to its declining liquidity and worsening financial position. In December 2018, it was announced that VTB Bank would be acquiring controlling stakes in Sarovbusinessbank (81.1%) and Zapsibcombank (71.8%).

==== 3rd decade ====
In March 2022, VTB, along with other Russian lenders, was delisted from the SWIFT transaction system, as punishment for the Russo-Ukrainian war. In May 2022, soon after the Russo-Ukrainian war and consequent blowback, Kostin looked forward to $52 billion in reduced costs if the Russian authorities relaxed the rules surrounding Basel III, but Nabiullina demurred, while she acknowledged that some banks may require a capital injection as a result.

In March 2023, VTB detailed a $4.7 billion takeover of Otkritie Bank. At the time, VTB was Russia's second biggest bank. The Russian Central Bank in 2017 had bought the private lender to avoid its crash and was the alienator in this transaction. Otkritie was believed to have approximately 500 retail banking locations throughout Russia.

In October 2024, Pyanov was forced to deny plans to repurchase shares from unfriendly non-residents, as this would have impacted VTB's Tier 1 capital ratio, which is required to be maintained under Basel III rules. In early December 2024, VTB said that the savings rate of their private individual clients had reached an all-time low.

In December 2024, VTB said it would hit a record profit of $5.5 billion for the year. Corporate lending was unaffected by the 21% prime rate because "loans to important sectors, such as the military-industrial complex, are still subsidised by the state, resulting in lower actual rates for some borrowers." The retail client was "taking advantage of short-term deposit interest rates reaching 26 per cent."

In January 2025, VTB announced that it would start up a branch in Iran. On 16 April 2025, VTB Bank announced it had absorbed RNKB, which focuses its operations in Occupied Crimea. RNKB had 2 million clients at that date. On 18 April 2025, owing to a change in strategy, VTB Bank called off its acquisition of Zvezda Shipbuilding Complex and said it would divest itself of United Shipbuilding Corporation. VTB would no longer be invested in reviving failed industrial concerns. Kostin cited guidance from the Russian Central Bank. In September 2025, VTB Bank launched a secondary public offering (SPO) of 1.264 billion ordinary shares (24% of that share class) to raise $1.02 billion. This will reduce the Russian government's holding to 50% + 1 and place the remainder into free float.

In September 2026, The US imposes new sanctions on VTB Bank for alleged ties to the Iranian regime.

== Mergers and acquisitions ==
VTB Bank took over 15 banks between 2002 and February 2019:

- Guta Bank (2004), later renamed VTB24
- Bank of Moscow
- TransCreditBank
- Armsberbank in Armenia (2004), later renamed VTB Armenia
- Promstroybank (2005), renamed Bank VTB North-West and later reorganised as VTB's North-Western Regional Centre
- Eurobank in Paris, France (2005), later renamed VTB France
- Evrofinance Mosnarbank in London, Great Britain (2005), based on the former Moscow Narodny Bank, later renamed VTB Europe Plc then VTB Capital Plc
- Ost-West Handelsbank AG in Germany (2005), later renamed VTB Germany
- United Georgian Bank (2005), later renamed VTB Georgia
- Mriya in Ukraine (2006), later merged with VTB Ukraine
- Slavneftebank in Belarus (2007), later renamed VTB Belarus
- AF Bank in Azerbaijan from AF Holding International (2008), later VTB Azerbaijan
- Post Bank (Russia) (2018)
- Vozrozhdenie (2018)
- Zapsibkombank (2018)
- SarovBusinessBank (2018).

=== VTB24, Russian Post and Post Bank ===
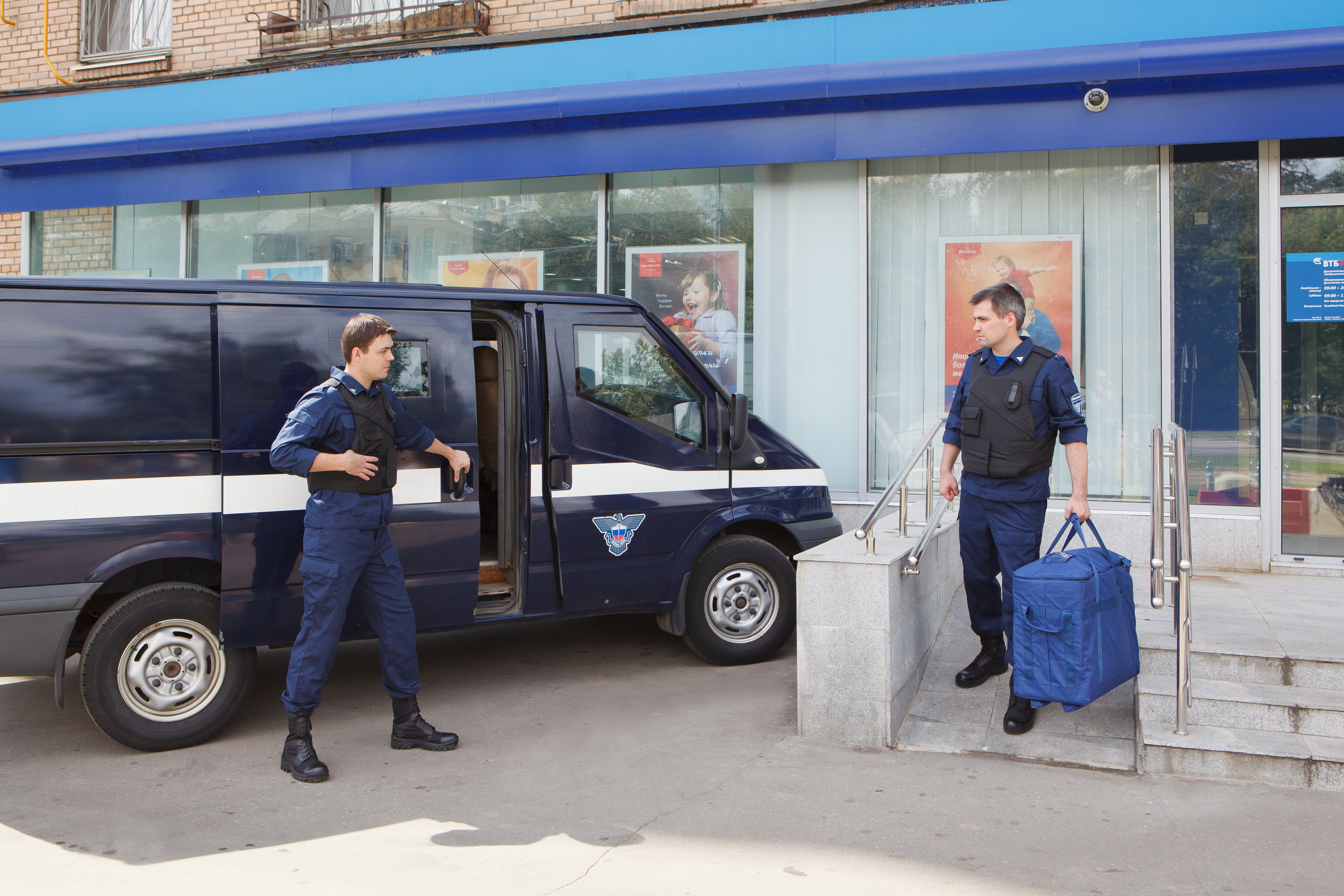
Transfer of cash from a VTB Bank branch

On 24 July 2015, an agreement, approved by Dmitry Medvedev, was signed between the bank president, director of Russian Post, Dmitry Strashnov, and Minister of Communications and Mass Media, Nikolai Nikiforov, on the Russian Post purchase of 50 percent minus 1 share of Leto Bank (Summer Bank) from VTB24, to reorganise it into the National Post Bank. VTB24, a subsidiary of VTB Bank, will own the remaining 50 percent plus one share. VTB CEO Kostin suggested appointing Dmitry Rudenko, the current head of Leto Bank, as the head of Post Bank (Russia).

On 28 January 2016, sets of documents were signed between VTB24 and Russian Post on establishing the Post Bank. Russian Post purchased 50 percent minus one share of the newly established Post Bank through its 100 percent subsidiary. VTB24, a subsidiary of VTB Bank, owns the remaining 50 percent plus one share. Dmitry Rudenko, the head of Leto Bank of VTB24, became the head of Post Bank (Russia).

On 28 December 2017, VTB24 sold two shares to Dmitry Rudenko, the chairman of the Board of Post Bank. VTB 24 and Russia Post have equal shares in Post Bank, with each holding 50 percent minus one share. VTB24 has 1,062 branches.

On 1 January 2018, VTB acquired VTB24. The integrated network has 1,350 branches.

== Sanctions ==
On 29 July 2014, the Office of Foreign Assets Control (OFAC) published that the Bank of Moscow and VTB Bank OJSC, the second-largest bank in Russia, had been added to the Sectoral Sanctions Identifications List. On 31 July 2014, VTB Bank and its subsidiaries was added to the European Union sanctions list due to its role in the annexation of Crimea by the Russian Federation that same year and the United Kingdom list from 1 August. On 6 August 2014, VTB was added to the Canadian sanctions list due to its role in the Russo-Ukrainian War and the downing of Malaysia Airlines Flight 17.

On 13 August 2014, the United States clarified the entities subject to sectoral sanctions. The United States increased its sectoral sanctions on VTB Bank, together with its subsidiaries ("the VTB Group") and the Bank of Moscow, through its parent bank, VTB Bank OAO, and other entities that VTB has a 50 percent or greater ownership stake in, either individually or in the aggregate, either directly or indirectly. Also, US persons cannot use a third-party intermediary, and they must use caution during "transactions with a non-blocked entity in which one or more blocked persons has a significant ownership interest that is less than 50 percent or which one or more blocked persons may control by means other than a majority ownership interest".

On 1 September 2014, VTB was added to the Australian autonomous sanctions list for Russia, Crimea, and Sevastopol. On 12 September 2014, the United States issued a consolidated listing of directives associated with Executive Order 13662 sanctions during the Russo-Ukrainian war. For the Russian financial sector, Directive 1 was amended to increase the financial sanctions on the Russian financial sector for "all transactions in, provision of financing for, and other dealings" in new equity or new debt issued on or after 12 September 2014 to longer than 30 days maturity. New equity or new debt issued from 29 July 2018 until 12 September 2018 was sanctioned if longer than 90 days maturity.

In 2015, the banks' chief Executive Andrei Kostin predicted loses for the bank in the years to come because of the plunging ruble accelerated by international sanctions. On 15 March 2017, Ukraine imposed sanctions against VTB Bank and subsidiaries because of the ongoing Russian interference in Ukraine. On 28 November 2017, the United States increased the sanctions imposed by Executive Order 13662 on the Russian financial sector. For the Russian financial sector, Directive 1 was amended to increase the financial sanctions on the Russian financial sector for "all transactions in, provision of financing for, and other dealings" in new equity or new debt issued on or after 28 November 2017 to longer than 14 days maturity. New equity or new debt issued from 12 September 2014 until 28 November 2017 was sanctioned if longer than 30 days maturity.

On 27 November 2018, the National Bank of Ukraine declared the Ukrainian subsidiary of VTB Bank insolvent due to its declining liquidity and worsening financial position.

On 25 June 2020 European Court of Justice rejected VTB and Sberbank bank's 2014 lawsuit against EU sectoral sanctions citing that regulators were within their aims of "imposing a cost on the Russian government" because of the latter's actions in Ukraine. The court specified that ambiguity in some language versions of the regulation (that the bank argued were wrongly applied) doesn't prevent the court interpreting that section in a way best suited to the general purpose of the legislation, and precedent.

In February 2022, amid the Russo–Ukrainian crisis, US and EU officials were reportedly finalizing an extensive package of sanctions on VTB bank and other related Russian entities. On 24 February, after Russia launched a full-scale invasion of Ukraine, US president Joe Biden and British prime minister Boris Johnson announced new sanctions against VTB bank and its directors, along with other Russian individuals and companies.

== Corporate affairs ==
=== Shareholders ===
In February 2011, the government floated an additional 10% minus two shares of VTB Bank. The private investors, who paid a total of 95.7 billion rubles ($3.1 billion) for the assets, included the investment funds Generali, TPG Capital, China Investment Corp, a sovereign wealth fund responsible for managing China's foreign exchange reserves, and companies affiliated with businessman Suleyman Kerimov.

In May 2013, VTB completed a secondary public offering (SPO), issuing 2.5 trillion new shares through a public subscription. All shares were placed on Moscow's primary stock exchange. The government did not participate in the SPO, so its stake in the bank decreased to 60.9% after the subscription closed. The bank raised 102.5 billion rubles worth of additional capital. Three sovereign wealth funds, Norway's Norges Bank Investment Management, Qatar Holding LLC, and the State Oil Fund of the Republic of Azerbaijan (SOFAZ) and commercial bank China Construction Bank became the largest investors during the SPO, after purchasing more than half of the additional shares issued.

In 2017, the main shareholder of VTB was the Russian government, which owned 60.9% of the lender through its Federal Agency for State Property Management. The remaining shares were split between holders of its Global Depository Receipts and minority shareholders, both individuals and companies.

==== 2020 and onward ====
As of February 2022, the bank reported that its stock shares were distributed in the following way:

- 12.13% of (capital) shares – Federal Agency for State Property Management (Russia)
- 32.88% of (capital) shares – Ministry of Finance (Russia)
- 47.22% of (capital) shares – Deposit Insurance Agency of Russia

=== Executive management ===
As of April 2022, its Management Committee (referred to as VTB Bank Management Board or VTB MB) includes:

- Andrey Kostin – Chief executive of the Bank (since 10 June 2002), President and Chairman of VTB Bank Management Board, Member of the Supervisory Council,
- Andrey Puchkov (First Deputy President and Chairman of VTB MB)
- Denis Alexandrovich Bortnikov (Deputy President and Chairman of VTB MB), son of Alexander Bortnikov, director of the Federal Security Service
- Olga Dergunova (Deputy President and Chairman of VTB MB)
- Valery Lukyanenko (Deputy President and Chairman of VTB MB)
- Anatoly Pechatnikov (Deputy President and Chairman of VTB MB)
- Maxim Kondratenko (Member of VTB MB)
- Erkin Norov (Member of VTB MB)
- Dmitriy Pianov (Member of VTB MB)

=== Supervisory council ===
As of April 2022, VTB's Supervisory Council consists of Anton Siluanov (Chairman of the Supervisory Council), Matthias Warnig (member of the Supervisory Council),[8] Sergey Dubinin (member of supervisory council), Mikhail Zadornov (Member of Supervisory Council), Andrey Kostin (President and Chairman of VTB Bank Management Board), Shahmar Movsumov (Independent member of supervisory council), Igor Repin (Independent member of Supervisory Council), Alexander Sokolov (Member of Supervisory Council), Vladimir Chistyukhin (member of supervisory council), Mukhadin Eskindarov (Member of Supervisory Council).

== Financial data ==
Consolidated Statement of Financial Position as at 31 December 2021: net interest income – 646,3 RUB billion, net fee and commission income – 90,0 RUB billion, operating income before provisions – 822,7 RUB billion, staff costs and administrative expenses – -308,8 RUB billion, net profit – 327,4 RUB billion.

The 2022 results showed a loss of 612.6 billion rubles ($7.7 billion), primarily due to the impact of sanctions.

== Major subsidiaries ==
Previously 100% owned VTB Capital (New-York, US etc.) was sold in September 2018

VTB's major subsidiaries as of April 2022 were:

Company	Share	Notes
Insurance company VTB Insurance	100%	
VTB-Leasing	100%	
VTB Dolgovoi centre	100%	
VTB Pension administrator	100%	
VTB Factoring	100%	
VTB Registrar	100%	
Hals-Development	96.44%	
VTB Arena	75.00%	
VTB Real Estate	100%	
VTB Bank (Austria) AG (incl. VTB Bank (Deutschland) AG, VTB Bank (France) SA)	100%	Inactive
VTB Bank (Armenia)	100%	
VTB Bank (Belarus)	100%	
VTB Bank (Kazakhstan)	100%	
VTB Bank (Azerbaijan)	51%	
Banco VTB Africa, SA (Angola)	50.1%	
National Post Bank (ex. Leto Bank)	50% minus 1	
Velobike (bike rental service)	100%	
VTB Specialized Depository, CJSC	100%	

As of 12 February 2018, the United States Department of the Treasury's Office of Foreign Assets Control (OFAC) Sectoral Sanctions Identifications list for VTB and its subsidiaries
- Bank VTB OAO 29, Bolshaya Morskaya str. Entity UKRAINE-EO13662 Non-SDN 100
- Bank VTB, Open Joint-stock Company 29, Bolshaya Morskaya str. Entity UKRAINE-EO13662 Non-SDN 100
- JSC VTB Bank 29, Bolshaya Morskaya str. Entity UKRAINE-EO13662 Non-SDN 100
- VTB Bank OAO 29, Bolshaya Morskaya str. Entity UKRAINE-EO13662 Non-SDN 100
- VTB Bank, OPEN JOINT-STOCK COMPANY 29, Bolshaya Morskaya str. Entity UKRAINE-EO13662 Non-SDN 100
- Bank VTB 24 (Zakrytoe Aktsionernoe Obshchestvo) d. 35 ul. Myasnitskaya Entity UKRAINE-EO13662 Non-SDN 100
- Bank VTB 24 Closed Joint Stock Company d. 35 ul. Myasnitskaya Entity UKRAINE-EO13662 Non-SDN 100
- Bank VTB 24 Public Joint Stock Company d. 35 ul. Myasnitskaya Entity UKRAINE-EO13662 Non-SDN 100
- Bank VTB 24 Publichnoe Aktsionernoe Obshchestvo d. 35 ul. Myasnitskaya Entity UKRAINE-EO13662 Non-SDN 100
- VTB 24 JSC d. 35 ul. Myasnitskaya Entity UKRAINE-EO13662 Non-SDN 100
- VTB 24 PAO d. 35 ul. Myasnitskaya Entity UKRAINE-EO13662 Non-SDN 100
- PJSC VTB Bank (Kiev) 8/26, Shevchenka boulevard/Pushkinska street Entity UKRAINE-EO13662 Non-SDN 100
- Public-Joint Stock Company VTB Bank (Ukraine) 8/26, Shevchenka boulevard/Pushkinska street Entity UKRAINE-EO13662 Non-SDN 100
- Publichne Aktsionerne Tovarystvo VTB Bank 8/26, Shevchenka boulevard/Pushkinska street Entity UKRAINE-EO13662 Non-SDN 100
- VTB Bank, PJSC 8/26, Shevchenka boulevard/Pushkinska street Entity UKRAINE-EO13662 Non-SDN 100
- VTB Bank, PJSC (Ukraine) 8/26, Shevchenka boulevard/Pushkinska street Entity UKRAINE-EO13662 Non-SDN 100
- VTB Bank, Public Joint Stock Company 8/26, Shevchenka boulevard/Pushkinska street Entity UKRAINE-EO13662 Non-SDN 100
- CJSC VTB Bank (Belarus) 14, Moskovskaya Street Entity UKRAINE-EO13662 Non-SDN 100
- VTB Bank (Belarus) 14, Moskovskaya Street Entity UKRAINE-EO13662 Non-SDN 100
- VTB Bank (Belarus) Closed Joint Stock Company 14, Moskovskaya Street Entity UKRAINE-EO13662 Non-SDN 100
- VTB Bank (Belarus), CJSC 14, Moskovskaya Street Entity UKRAINE-EO13662 Non-SDN 100
- VTB Bank (Armenia) CJSC 46 Ul Nalbandyan Entity UKRAINE-EO13662 Non-SDN 100
- VTB Bank (Armenia), CJSC 46 Ul Nalbandyan Entity UKRAINE-EO13662 Non-SDN 100
- Bank VTB (Kazakhstan), JSC 28 v Timiryazeva str. Entity UKRAINE-EO13662 Non-SDN 100
- Joint Stock Company VTB Bank (Kazakhstan) 28 v Timiryazeva str. Entity UKRAINE-EO13662 Non-SDN 100
- Subsidiary JSC Bank VTB (Kazakhstan) 28 v Timiryazeva str. Entity UKRAINE-EO13662 Non-SDN 100
- Bank VTB (Azerbaijan) OJSC 38 Khatai ave. Nasimi district Entity UKRAINE-EO13662 Non-SDN 100
- JSC VTB Bank (Azerbaijan) 38 Khatai ave. Nasimi district Entity UKRAINE-EO13662 Non-SDN 100
- VTB Bank (Azerbaijan), OJSC 38 Khatai ave. Nasimi district Entity UKRAINE-EO13662 Non-SDN 100
- BANCO VTB Africa, S.A. 22, Rua da Missao Entity UKRAINE-EO13662 Non-SDN 100
- VTB Africa 22, Rua da Missao Entity UKRAINE-EO13662 Non-SDN 100
- JSC VTB Bank (Georgia) 14, G. Chanturia Street Entity UKRAINE-EO13662 Non-SDN 100
- JSC VTB Bank Georgia 14, G. Chanturia Street Entity UKRAINE-EO13662 Non-SDN 100
- VTB Bank (Georgia), JSC 14, G. Chanturia Street Entity UKRAINE-EO13662 Non-SDN 100
- VTB Bank (Austria) AG Parking 6, PO Box 560 Entity UKRAINE-EO13662 Non-SDN 100
- VTB Bank JSC Belgrade 2 Balkanska street Entity UKRAINE-EO13662 Non-SDN 100
- VTB Banka AD Beograd 2 Balkanska street Entity UKRAINE-EO13662 Non-SDN 100
- Holding VTB Capital, CJSC 12 Presnenskaya nab. Entity UKRAINE-EO13662 Non-SDN 100
- KHolding VTB Kapital Zakrytoe Aktsionernoe Obshchestvo 12 Presnenskaya nab. Entity UKRAINE-EO13662 Non-SDN 100
- VTB Capital Holding CJSC 12 Presnenskaya nab. Entity UKRAINE-EO13662 Non-SDN 100
- VTB Capital Holding ZAO 12 Presnenskaya nab. Entity UKRAINE-EO13662 Non-SDN 100
- Obshchestvo s Ogranichennoi Otvetstvennostyu VTB Pensionny Administrator d. 52 str. 1 nab.Kosmodamianskaya Entity UKRAINE-EO13662 Non-SDN 100
- VTB Pension Administrator, Limited d. 52 str. 1 nab.Kosmodamianskaya Entity UKRAINE-EO13662 Non-SDN 100
- VTB Pension Administrator, Ltd d. 52 str. 1 nab.Kosmodamianskaya Entity UKRAINE-EO13662 Non-SDN 100
- VTB Pensionny Administrator, OOO d. 52 str. 1 nab.Kosmodamianskaya Entity UKRAINE-EO13662 Non-SDN 100
- VTB DC (Debt Center), Ltd Room 47, office XIV, 8 Brestskaya Street Entity UKRAINE-EO13662 Non-SDN 100
- Insurance Company VTB-Insurance Limited str. 1 8 Chistoprudnyy bulvar Entity UKRAINE-EO13662 Non-SDN 100
- Insurance Company VTB-Insurance, Ltd str. 1 8 Chistoprudnyy bulvar Entity UKRAINE-EO13662 Non-SDN 100
- VTB Insurance Limited str. 1 8 Chistoprudnyy bulvar Entity UKRAINE-EO13662 Non-SDN 100
- VTB Strakhovanie SK OOO str. 1 8 Chistoprudnyy bulvar Entity UKRAINE-EO13662 Non-SDN 100
- VTB Strakhovanie Strakhovaya Kompaniya OOO str. 1 8 Chistoprudnyy bulvar Entity UKRAINE-EO13662 Non-SDN 100
- Obshchestvo s Ogranichennoi Otvetstvennostyu VTB Faktoring d. 52 str. 1 nab.Kosmodamianskaya Entity UKRAINE-EO13662 Non-SDN 100
- VTB Factoring Limited d. 52 str. 1 nab.Kosmodamianskaya Entity UKRAINE-EO13662 Non-SDN 100
- VTB Factoring, Ltd d. 52 str. 1 nab.Kosmodamianskaya Entity UKRAINE-EO13662 Non-SDN 100
- VTB Faktoring, OOO d. 52 str. 1 nab.Kosmodamianskaya Entity UKRAINE-EO13662 Non-SDN 100
- Aktsionernoe Obshchestvo Negosudarstvenny Pensionny Fond VTB Pensionny Fond d. 43 str. 1 ul. Vorontsovskaya Entity UKRAINE-EO13662 Non-SDN 100
- Nekommercheskaya Organizatsiya Negosudarstvenny Pensionny Fond VTB Pensionny Fond d. 43 str. 1 ul. Vorontsovskaya Entity UKRAINE-EO13662 Non-SDN 100
- Non-State Pension Fund VTB Pension Fund, JSC d. 43 str. 1 ul. Vorontsovskaya Entity UKRAINE-EO13662 Non-SDN 100
- Nonprofit Organization Non-state Pension Fund VTB Pension Fund d. 43 str. 1 ul. Vorontsovskaya Entity UKRAINE-EO13662 Non-SDN 100
- NPF VTB Pension Fund, JSC d. 43 str. 1 ul. Vorontsovskaya Entity UKRAINE-EO13662 Non-SDN 100
- NPF VTB Pensionny Fond, AO d. 43 str. 1 ul. Vorontsovskaya Entity UKRAINE-EO13662 Non-SDN 100
- Obshchestvo s Ogranichennoi Otvetstvennostyu VTB Nedvizhimost d.70 ul. Mosfilmovskaya Entity UKRAINE-EO13662 Non-SDN 100
- VTB Nedvishimost, OOO d.70 ul. Mosfilmovskaya Entity UKRAINE-EO13662 Non-SDN 100
- VTB Real Estate Limited Liability Company d.70 ul. Mosfilmovskaya Entity UKRAINE-EO13662 Non-SDN 100
- VTB Real Estate, LLC d.70 ul. Mosfilmovskaya Entity UKRAINE-EO13662 Non-SDN 100
- CJS VTB Specialized Depository 35 Myasnitskaya Street Entity UKRAINE-EO13662 Non-SDN 100
- VTB Specialized Depository, CJSC 35 Myasnitskaya Street Entity UKRAINE-EO13662 Non-SDN 100
- VTB Registrar 23, Pravdy Street Entity UKRAINE-EO13662 Non-SDN 100
- VTB Registrar, CJSC 23, Pravdy Street Entity UKRAINE-EO13662 Non-SDN 100
- JSC VTB Leasing 2nd Volkonskiy pereulok 10 Entity UKRAINE-EO13662 Non-SDN 100
- VTB Leasing Open Joint-stock Company 2nd Volkonskiy pereulok 10 Entity UKRAINE-EO13662 Non-SDN 100
- VTB Lizing, OAO 2nd Volkonskiy pereulok 10 Entity UKRAINE-EO13662 Non-SDN 100
- VTB Lizing, Otkrytoe Aktsionernoe Obshchestvo 2nd Volkonskiy pereulok 10 Entity UKRAINE-EO13662 Non-SDN 100
- VTB-Leasing, OJSC 2nd Volkonskiy pereulok 10 Entity UKRAINE-EO13662 Non-SDN 100

== Sports sponsorships ==
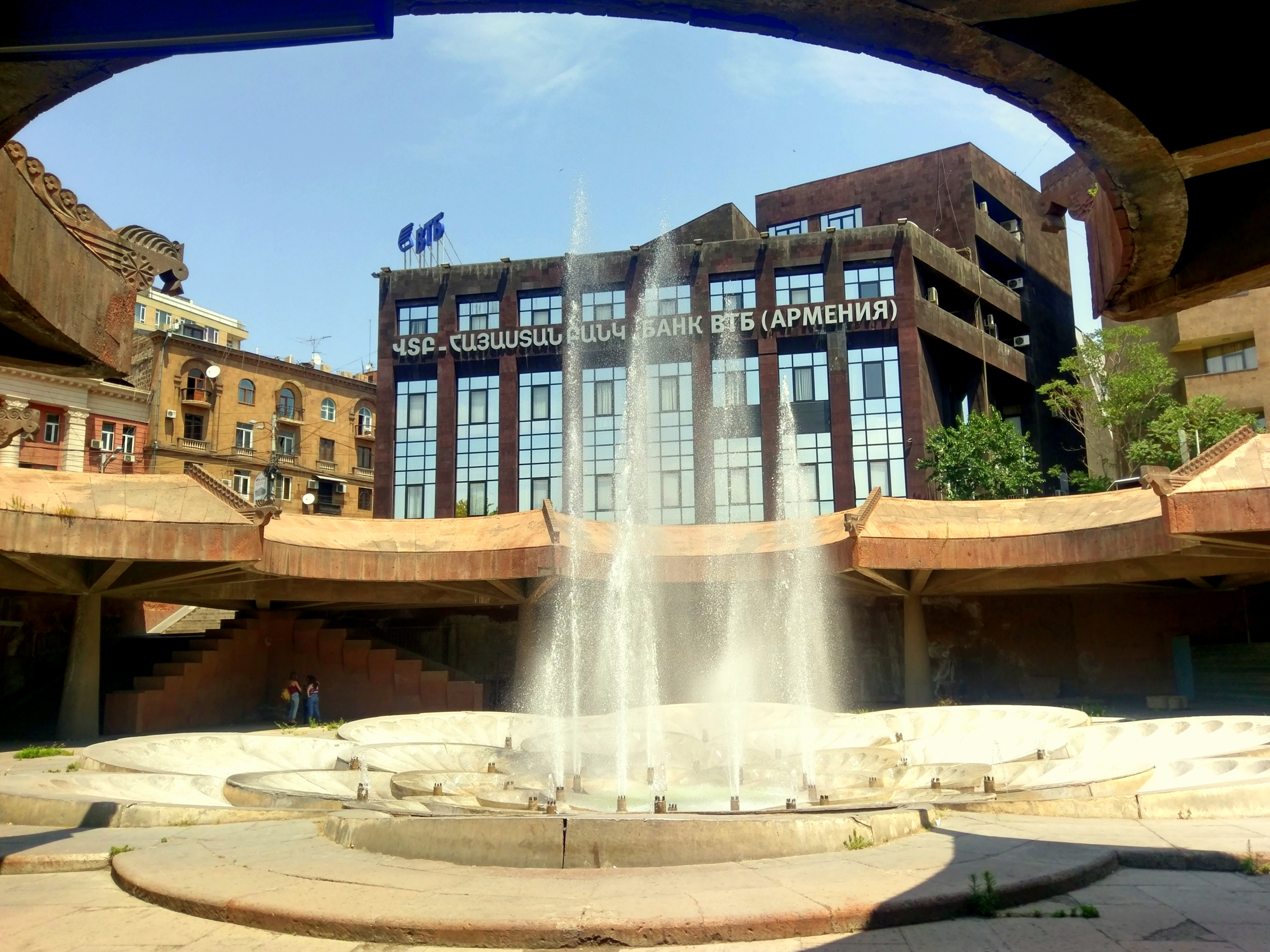
The headquarters of VTB Armenia in Yerevan

VTB is one of the sponsors of all Dinamo Moscow sport clubs. Since 2017, VTB Bank has been the title partner of the Russian Formula 1 stage in Sochi – Formula 1 VTB Russian Grand Prix. Since 2016, VTB has been the name of the tennis tournament VTB Kremlin Cup. VTB has also been the title sponsor of the VTB United League since 2008. Since 2005, VTB Bank has been the general sponsor of the Kamaz Master team, a team which has been active in renowned rally raid such as Dakar Rally, Silk Way Rally and Africa Eco Race. Since 2013, VTB Group has been supporting the Velobike, a bicycle-sharing system in Moscow, a project by the Department for Transport and Development of Road Infrastructure of the city. In 2018, the number of trips exceeded 3 million.

== See also ==
- Timeline of Russian interference in the 2016 United States elections
- Timeline of investigations into Trump and Russia (July–December 2017)
- East-West United Bank
