= Federal Service for Intellectual Property =

Russian government patent agency

Coordinates: 55°43′53″N 37°33′05″E

- Федеральная служба по интеллектуальной собственности (Роспатент)
- Emblem of the Federal Service for Intellectual Property

Agency overview
- Formed: 9 March 2004; 22 years ago
- Headquarters: Berezhkovskaya Naberezhnaya, 30/1, Moscow, Russia
- Agency executive: Grigory Ivliyev
- Parent agency: Ministry of Economic Development
- Website: Rospatent.gov.ru

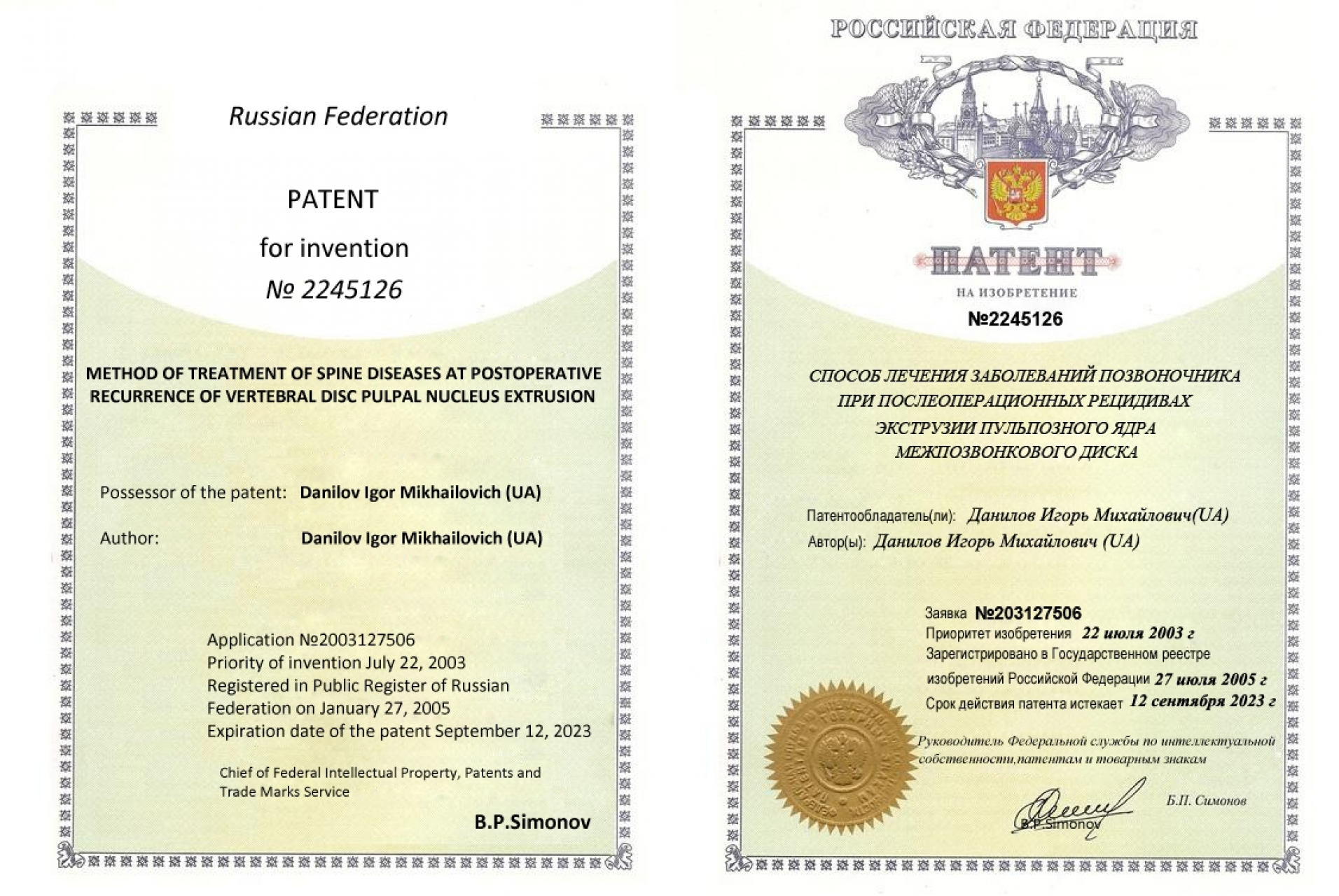
Russian Patent Certificate (with Unofficial English Translation)

The Federal Service for Intellectual Property (commonly known as Rospatent; Russian: Федеральная служба по интеллектуальной собственности (Роспатент), romanized: Federalnaya sluzhba po intellektualnoi sobstvennosti) is a Russian governmental agency in charge of intellectual property. Its former name was "Federal Service for Intellectual Property, Patents and Trademarks (Rospatent)".

In the former Soviet Union, Goskomizobretenie (Russian: Госкомизобретений), which stood for Gosudarstvennyi komitet po delam izobretenie i otkrytii, was the State Committee for Inventions and Discoveries. It maintained a registry of inventions and discoveries and gave out authors certificates and patents.

As of 1 August 2020, 476,905 national trademarks and 220,513 international trademarks were registered at the Russian Federal Service for Intellectual Property, and it issued 266,104 patents.
