= Metalloinvest =

Russian mining and metallurgical company

- Type: Joint stock
- Industry: Mining, metallurgy, steel
- Founded: 1999
- Headquarters: Moscow, Russia
- Key people: Oleg Krestinin (CEO); Nazim Efendiev (chairman of the board of directors)
- Products: Iron ore Steel; Steel products
- Revenue: $4.26 billion (2016; 2017; 2023; 2024)
- Operating income: $1.14 billion (2016; 2023; 2024)
- Net income: $1.15 billion (2016; 2023; 2024)
- Total assets: $6.2 billion (2016; 2023; 2024)
- Total equity: $975 million (2016; 2023; 2024)
- Owner: USM Holdings (100%)
- Number of employees: 60,000 (2014)
- Website: www.metalloinvest.com

Metalloinvest Management Company LLC (Russian: Металлоинвест) is a Russian mining and metallurgical company specializing in iron ore extraction and steel production. Founded in 1999, the company includes a mining division (Lebedinsky GOK and Mikhailovsky GOK) and a steel division (Oskol Electrometallurgical Plant and Ural Steel, the latter sold in 2022).

Metalloinvest is wholly owned by USM Holdings. Alisher Usmanov is the principal beneficiary of USM Holdings, with additional stakes historically attributed to companies linked to Andrei Skoch and Farhad Moshiri.

In 2021, Bloomberg reported that Metalloinvest was evaluating a potential initial public offering; however, as of 2025 the company remains privately held.

In 2022, Metalloinvest reported revenue of 121 billion rubles.

== Operations, related companies, and subsidiaries ==
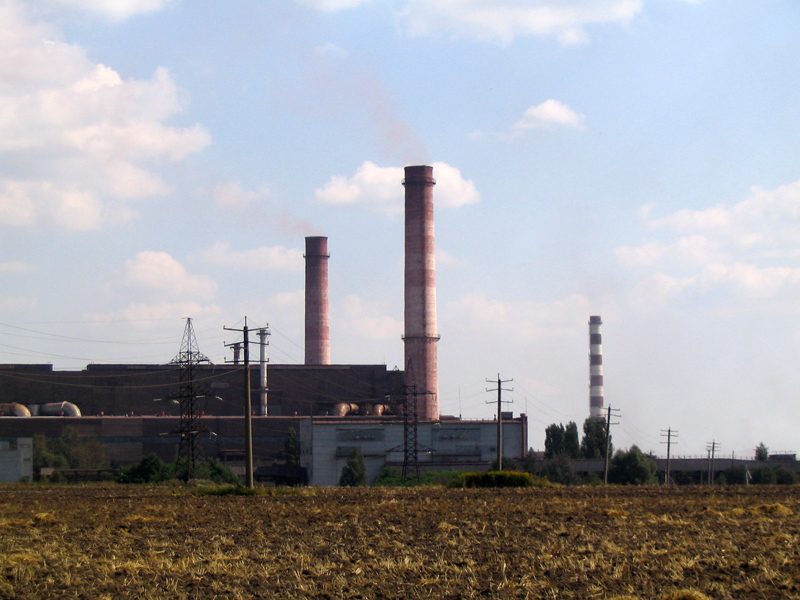
Mikhailovsky GOK, one of the largest iron ore mining and processing facilities in Russia.

=== Mining ===
- Lebedinsky GOK, Gubkin, Belgorod Oblast. One of Russia's largest iron ore producers.
- Mikhailovsky GOK, Zheleznogorsk, Kursk Oblast.

Metalloinvest previously held a minority stake in Norilsk Nickel, which it divested in 2017.

=== Metallurgy ===
- Oskol Electrometallurgical Plant (OEMK), Stary Oskol, Belgorod Oblast.
- Ural Steel, Novotroitsk, Orenburg Oblast – sold to the Zagorsky Pipe Plant in February 2022.

=== Other divisions ===
- Metalloinvesttrans, responsible for transportation and logistics, including rail operations.
- ORMETO–YUMZ, mechanical engineering, Orsk.
- Safisa, an events venue acquired in 2022.

== Ownership ==
Metalloinvest is part of the USM Steel & Mining division of USM Holdings. Historical corporate structure (held through Cyprus entities) included:

- USM Steel & Mining Group Limited – 35%
- Metalloinvest Limited – 24%
- Seropaem Holdings Limited – 21%
- USM Investments Limited – 20%

== Leadership ==
On 27 April 2020, long-time CEO Andrey Varichev died from complications related to bilateral pneumonia.

Nazim Efendiev was CEO from 2020 to December 2023. In December 2023, Efendiev became Chairman of the Board of Directors, and Oleg Krestinin was appointed CEO.

== Competition ==
Major domestic competitors include Evraz and Novolipetsk Steel.

== See also ==
- List of steel producers
