= Andrey Kostin =

Russian banker (born 1956)

- Андрей Костин
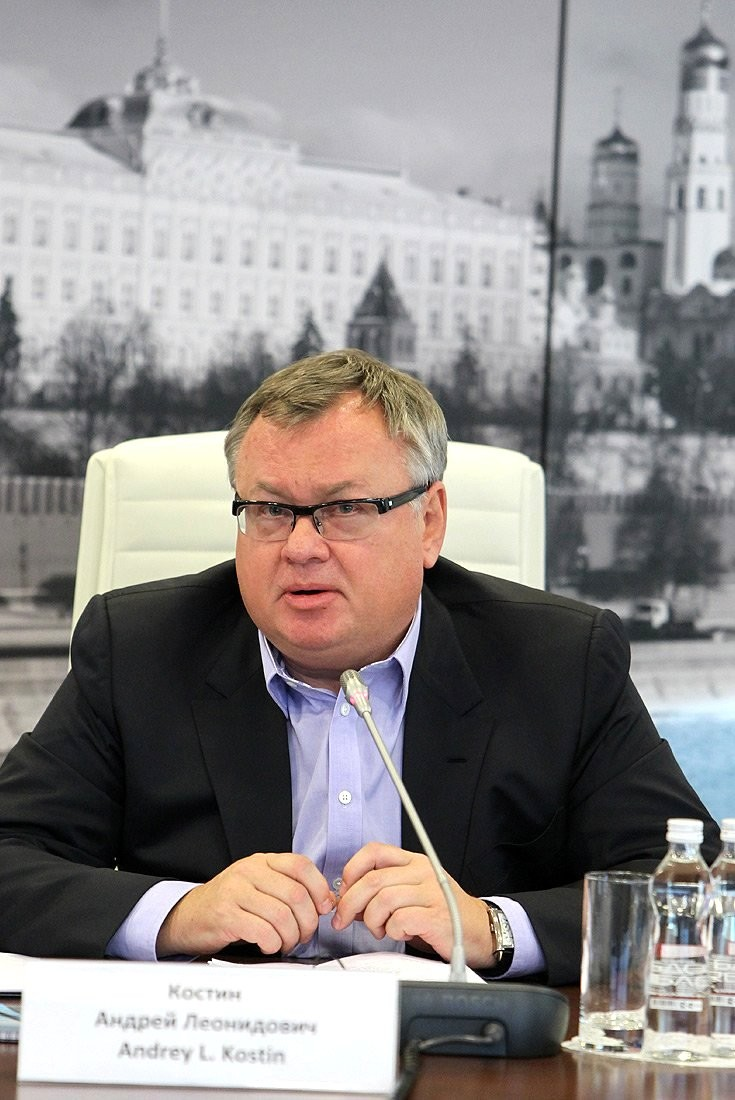
- Kostin in 2012
- Born: Andrey L. Kostin; September 21, 1956 (age 69); Moscow, Russian SFSR, Soviet Union
- Education: Moscow State University, Faculty of Economics
- Occupation: Chairman of United Shipbuilding Corporation

Andrey Leonidovich Kostin (Russian: Андрей Леонидович Костин; born September 21, 1956) is a Russian businessman who is chairman of the United Shipbuilding Corporation's Board of Directors since August 25, 2023. President and Chairman of the Board of VTB since June 10, 2002

== Education and career ==
In 1973, Kostin began studies at Moscow State University, graduating in 1979 with a degree in political economy. He subsequently worked at the USSR Ministry of Foreign Affairs. From that year, until 1982 he was an employee of the USSR Consulate General in Sydney, Australia. From 1982 to 1985, he was Secretary of the European Department of the USSR Ministry of Foreign Affairs. In 1985, he became an employee of the USSR Embassy in Great Britain working on economic issues with the KGB spy Alexander Lebedev, where he remained until 1990. From then to 1992, he was First Secretary, Advisor to the European Department of the USSR Ministry of Foreign Affairs.

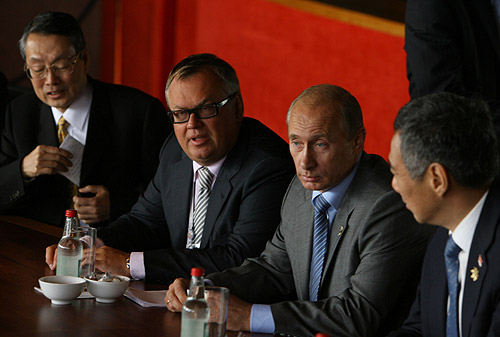
Kostin, Russian President Vladimir Putin and Prime Minister of Singapore Lee Hsien Loong at the APEC Australia 2007

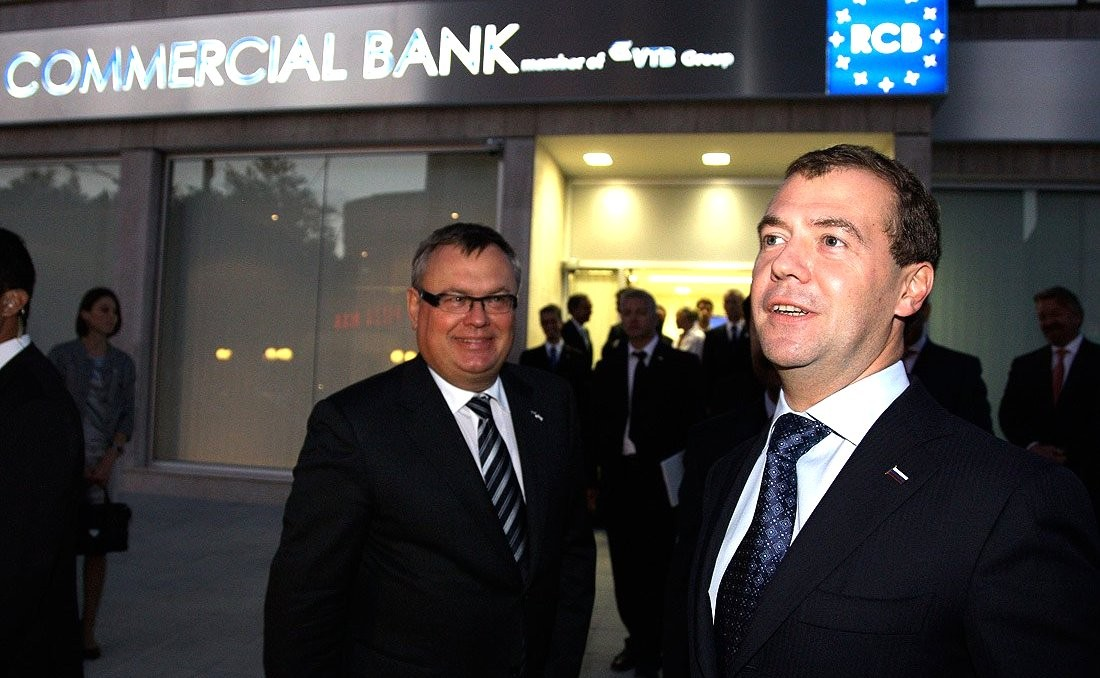
Kostin and Russian President Dmitry Medvedev at an opening ceremony of the Russian Commercial Bank in Cyprus in 2010

He is the president of the Financial and Banking Council of the Commonwealth of Independent States (CIS-FBC) from 2006 to 2017, being succeeded by Vadim Kumin.

In May 2017, Kostin suggested the Washington elite was purposefully disrupting the presidency of Donald Trump by spreading false accusations about his ties to Russia. In January 2018, Kostin said that additional sanctions against Russian individuals or entities would be an "economic war".

He is on the supervisory board of Post Bank.

On August 25, 2023, Kostin was elected as the chairman of the Board of Directors of the United Shipbuilding Corporation by the board.

== Criticism and corruption allegations ==
=== Blocking of publications by Roskomnadzor ===
On April 4, 2019, the Vedomosti newspaper drew attention to the massive blocking of publications by Roskomnadzor on the Internet, most of which mentioned gifts from VTB bank president Andrei Kostin to Nailya Asker-zade, a television journalist and his longtime girlfriend. In the interests of VTB, and by a court decision, Roskomnadzor blocked about 1000 publications.

On December 2, 2019, FBK's Alexei Navalny released an investigation about Kostin's relationship with Naila Asker-zade on YouTube. In this video Alexei Navalny accused Kostin of making gifts to journalist Nailya Asker-zade (use of a business jet, yacht, house in the cottage village, two apartments, one of them directly from VTB, second from Kirill Zimarin, the head of a subsidiary of VTB in Cyprus) with proof from her Instagram account. Kostin, according to Navalny in his video clip, uses money belonging to the bank, 60.9% of which is state-owned, to buy luxurious real estate for his beloved. According to The Bell said that there is a link between VTB and the business jet, but not with the yacht, and that it is impossible to draw a conclusion about the owners of the plane and yacht, as well as who paid for the journalist's travels. On December 25, 2019, Kostin said that he would think about what actions to take about the investigation, and refused to comment.

== Sanctions ==
In April 2018, the United States imposed sanctions on him and 23 other Russian nationals.

On March 15, 2019, Canada imposed sanctions on a number of individuals, including Kostin, over violations of Ukraine's sovereignty and territorial integrity. He was also sanctioned by decree of Ukrainian President Volodymyr Zelenskyy on June 24, 2021.

On February 23, 2022, after Russia's recognition of the DPR and LPR, Kostin was included in the sanctions list of all countries of the European Union.

Following Russia's 2022 invasion of Ukraine, the UK imposed sanctions on Kostin which involved freezing his assets and a travel ban. After the invasion, Switzerland, Japan, New Zealand and Australia also imposed sanctions.

=== Sanctions evasion charges ===
On February 22, 2024, the United States Department of Justice charged Kostin and two associates, Vadim Wolfson and Gannon Bond, with money laundering and violating the American sanctions against him. Allegedly, Wolfson and Bond renovated and sold Kostin's luxury home in Aspen on his behalf and wired him around $12 million of the proceeds, and illegally used American currency to maintain Kostin's superyachts. The three are also accused of laundering funds through a series of shell companies for these purposes. Wolfson and Bond were arrested that morning and presented to federal courts, while Kostin avoided arrest due to residing in Russia.

== Personal life ==
According to official data, Kostin is married, has children and a grandson. Nailya Asker-Zade, a reporter on the state-run channel Russia-24, is his long-time girlfriend.

His eldest son Andrey (1978–2011), worked as deputy chairman of the board of Deutsche Bank in Russia. He died on July 2, 2011, during a trip on an ATV while on vacation in the Yaroslavl Region.
