= Bank of Moscow =

Russian financial institution

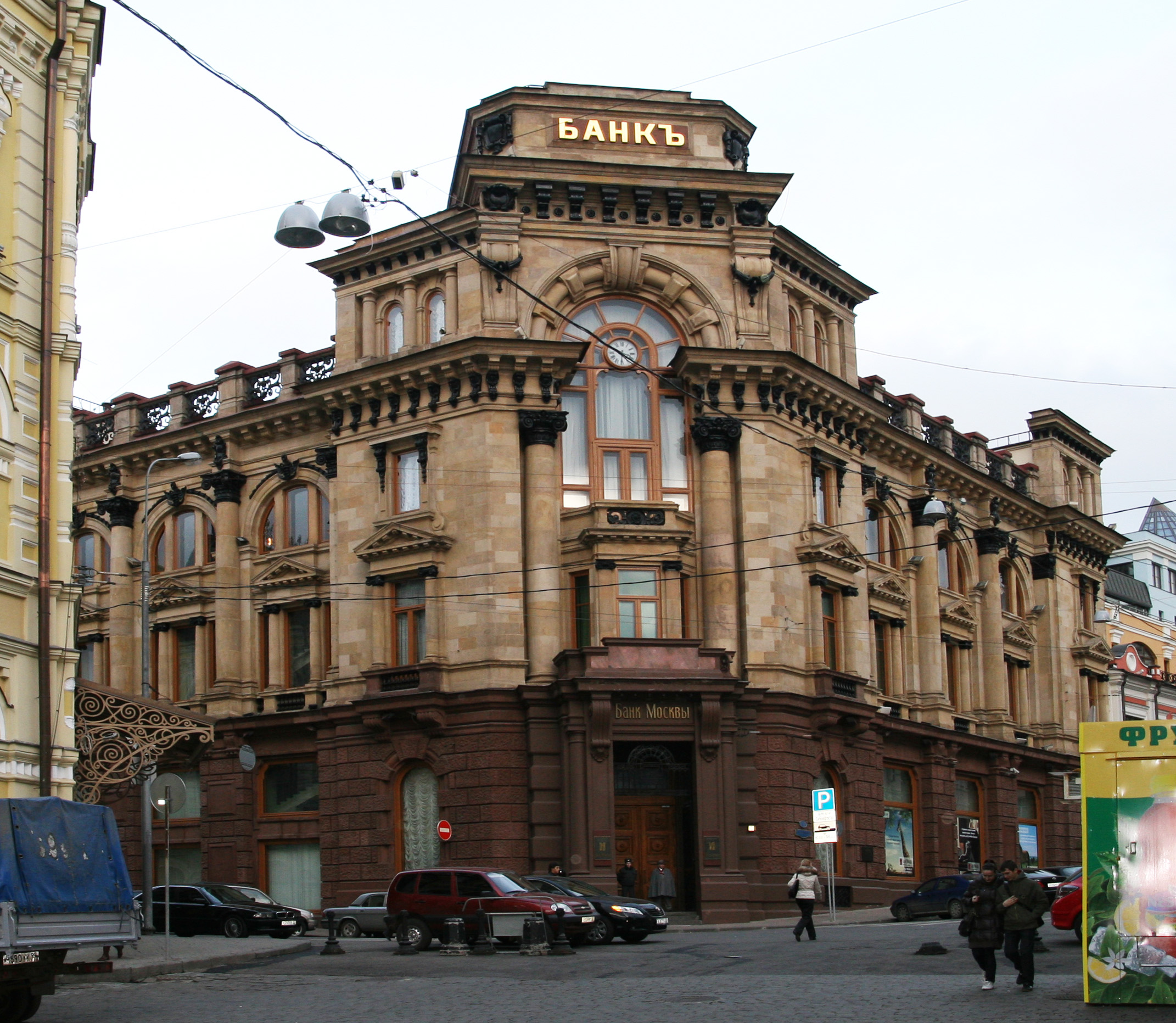
- Native name: Банк Москвы
- Traded as: MSKB@RU
- Industry: Finance
- Founded: 1995 (as Moscow Municipal Bank - Bank of Moscow); 2016 (as VTB Bank)
- Defunct: 10 May 2016
- Fate: Merged with VTB Bank
- Successor: VTB Bank
- Headquarters: Moscow, Russia
- Number of locations: 42 branches in Moscow and Moscow region and 43 branches in major cities of Russia
- Area served: Russia
- Key people: Andrei Kostin (Chairman)
- Services: Banking
- AUM: RUB 669 bln
- Total assets: RUB 958 bln
- Total equity: 121,6 billion rubles. (2009, IFRS )
- Number of employees: 10504 (30 September 2009)
- Website: www.bm.ru/en

The Bank of Moscow (Russian: Банк Москвы) was a Russian bank that provided banking services to both corporate and retail customers until May 2016. Headquartered in Moscow, the bank had 267 outlets, including branch offices and cash desks. BoM had over 114,000 corporate and 9 million retail customers. In 2011, it was the fifth largest bank in Russia. As of 1 July 2016, it had 6.3 million banking cards in its portfolio. Its central office was located in the building of the Moscow International Bank in Moscow, on the corner of Kuznetsky Most and Rozhdestvenka streets.

On 10 May 2016 its merger into VTB Bank was finalized.

In 2011, following a hostile takeover by VTB Bank, US$9 billion VTB claimed they had found several fraudulent loans, and the bank received an unprecedented US$14 billion bailout. Though Russia issued an international arrest warrant for Andrey Borodin for his suspected role in the accused fraud, he was granted political asylum in the UK in February 2013.

== History ==
The bank was established in 1995 under the name Moscow Municipal Bank – Bank of Moscow.

In 1999 Bank of Moscow obtained a 45% stake in the Russian Land Bank (RZB) (Russian: «Русский Земельный Банк» (РЗБ)).

By February 2011, the Government of Moscow's 46.48% ownership had been completely sold to VTB Bank. VTB also acquired 25% plus one share of Capital Insurance Group, which had a 17.32% stake in the Bank of Moscow. The total purchase price was 103 billion rubles. Besides VTB, the Russian Alfa Bank, and Bank Austria, a subsidiary of UniCredit, declared great interest in buying the Moscow government's stake. The sale was made to VTB (according to the representative of the Moscow mayor's office) because of a higher price offered and the availability of complete documentation, including a permit to purchase from the Russian Federal Antimonopoly Service. In March 2011, VTB bought shares owned by Credit Suisse (2.77%) and shares owned by a Swiss fund (1.7%), bringing its stake to a controlling interest of approximately 51%.

In early April 2011, Andrey Borodin and Lev Alaluyev sold their 20.32% stake in Bank of Moscow to Vitaly Yusufov, son of the former Russian Energy Minister Igor Yusufov. Vitaly Yusofov had borrowed US$1.1 billion from the Bank of Moscow for this acquisition.

Borodin himself, who by this time had been indicted in absentia for abuse of office, said that the transaction was carried out with a "torn off by hand", and that the change of leadership at the bank led to the raids. By the end of September 2011, VTB had acquired more than 80% of the shares of the Bank of Moscow, buying from Vital Yusufov (20%), and Suleiman Kerimov (3.88%). Shares were also acquired as part of a package of the Metropolitan Insurance Group.

The media suggested when Borodin left, more than half of the bank's loan portfolio consisted of loans issued to companies affiliated with Borodin. Borodin himself refused to comment on this information. According to an investigation by the newspaper "Vedomosti", the total amount of loans granted by the bank to companies associated with Borodin was approximately 217 billion rubles, which exceeded the bank's equity. According to the newspaper, a significant part of these loans were used to repay loans which were dubious or not secured by liquid assets, and later this information was confirmed by an inspection of the Accounts Chamber of the Russian Federation.

Later, it was announced by VTB that the bank had 380 billion rubles in bad debt. As a result, in late September 2011 the Deposit Insurance Agency provided a loan for 10 years, amounting to 295 billion rubles. At 0.51% per annum (DIA itself provided the money to the Bank of Russia) to cover the newly formed "holes" in the accounts of the bank.

On 29 July 2014 the Office of Foreign Assets Control (OFAC) published that the Bank of Moscow and VTB Bank OAO, which is the second-largest bank in Russia, has been added to the Sectoral Sanctions Identifications List. A United States person or a person in the United States is restricted from buying equity issued by these banks or lending money to these banks (i.e., buying debt issued by these banks). The sanction is for "transacting in, providing financing for, or otherwise dealing in new debt of longer than 90 days maturity or new equity" with these banks or their property or interests in property.

On 31 July 2014 VTB and its subsidiaries, such as the Bank of Moscow, were added to the European Union sanctions list due to its role in the annexation of Crimea by the Russian Federation. VTB assets and its subsidiaries, such as Bank of Moscow, in the EU have to be frozen.

On 13 August 2014, the United States clarifies entities under sectoral sanctions. United States increases its sectoral sanctions on VTB Bank together with its subsidiaries ("the VTB Group") and the Bank of Moscow through its parent bank, VTB Bank OAO, and other entities that VTB has 50% or greater ownership either individually or in the aggregate, either directly or indirectly. Also, US persons cannot use a third party intermediary, and they must use caution during "transactions with a non-blocked entity in which one or more blocked persons has a significant ownership interest that is less than 50% or which one or more blocked persons may control by means other than a majority ownership interest."

On 12 September 2014, the United States issues a consolidated listing of directives associated with Executive Order 13662 sanctions during the Russo-Ukrainian war. For the Russian financial sector, Directive 1 was amended to increase the financial sanctions on the Russian financial sector for "all transactions in, provision of financing for, and other dealings" in new equity or new debt issued on or after 12 September 2014 to longer than 30 days maturity. New equity or new debt issued from 29 July 2018 until 12 September 2018 was sanctioned if longer than 90 days maturity.

On 22 December 2015, the United States explicitly lists VTB Bank and its subsidiaries that are sanctioned. Previous United States sanctions on VTB and its subsidiaries have already restricted VTB, VTB Global, Bank of Moscow, and other entities from gaining long-term financial support from any United States person or person in the United States.

On 1 September 2016, the United States explicitly lists Bank of Moscow and its subsidiaries that are sanctioned. Previous United States sanctions on VTB and its subsidiaries have already restricted VTB, VTB Global, Bank of Moscow, and other entities from gaining long-term financial support from any United States person or person in the United States.

On 28 November 2017, the United States increases the Executive Order 13662 sanctions to the Russian financial sector. For the Russian financial sector, Directive 1 was amended to increase the financial sanctions on the Russian financial sector for "all transactions in, provision of financing for, and other dealings" in new equity or new debt issued on or after 28 November 2017 to longer than 14 days maturity. New equity or new debt issued from 12 September 2014 until 28 November 2017 was sanctioned if longer than 30 days maturity.
