= Hotel Cleveland =

Historic hotel in Cleveland, Ohio

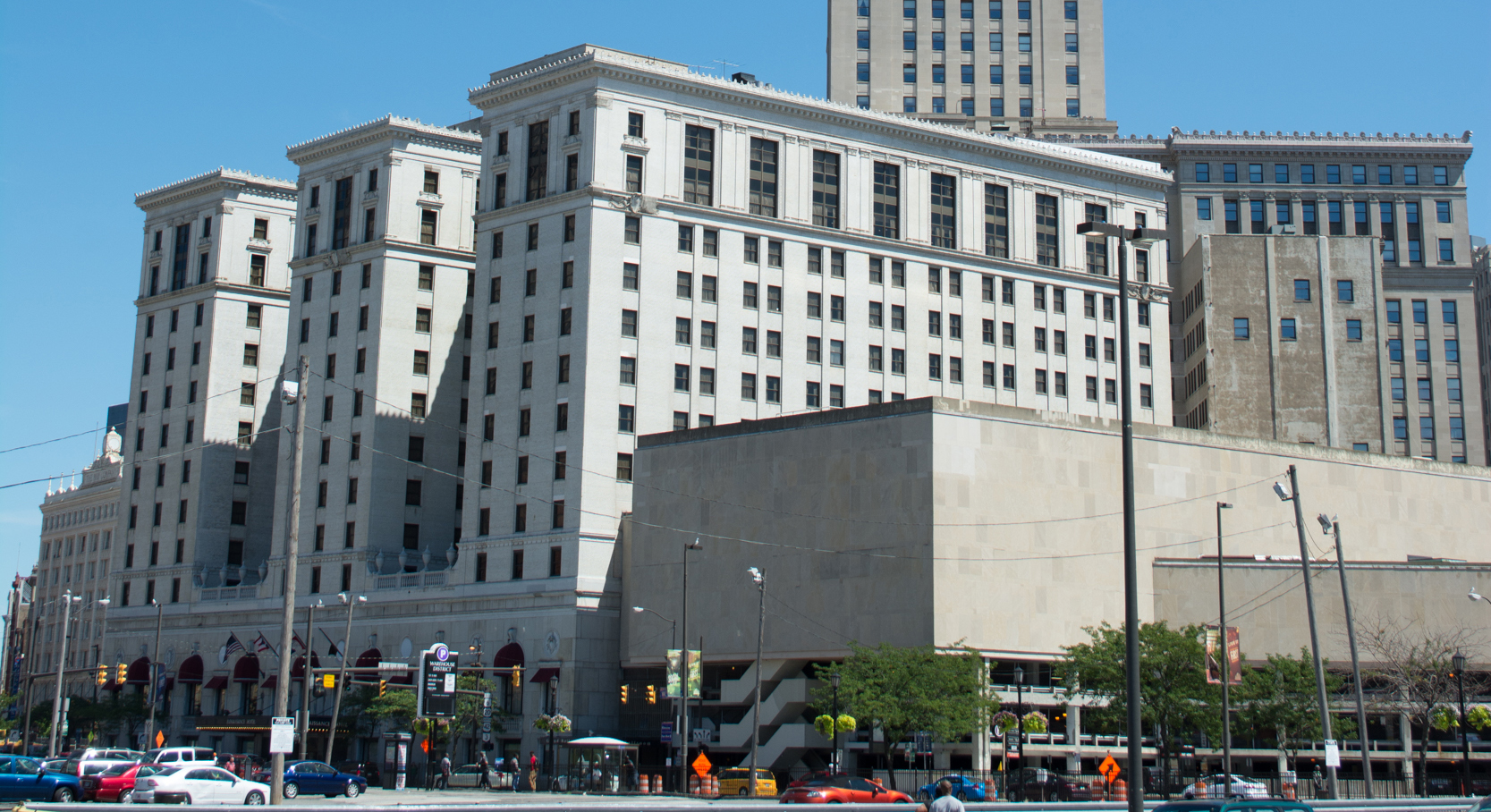
- Hotel Cleveland with Terminal Tower in the rear and windowless 1962 convention wing to the right

General information
- Location: Cleveland, Ohio, 24 Public Square
- Coordinates: 41°29′55″N 81°41′42″W
- Opening: December 16, 1918
- Operator: Autograph Collection

Height
- Height: 162 ft

Technical details
- Floor count: 12

Other information
- Number of rooms: 441
- Number of suites: 50
- Public transit: Tower City

Website
- Official website

The Hotel Cleveland is a historic hotel on Public Square in Cleveland, Ohio, opened in 1918. It is today part of the Tower City Center mixed-use complex.

== History ==
=== Site ===
A place of lodging has occupied the site since 1815, when Phinney Mowrey opened Mowrey's Tavern. Donald MacIntosh purchased the tavern in 1820 and operated it as the Cleveland House and later the City Hotel until it was destroyed by fire in 1845. In 1848, it was rebuilt as the Dunham House, which was enlarged in 1852 and renamed the Forest City House. That structure was demolished in 1916 to make way for the current hotel.

=== Hotel Cleveland ===
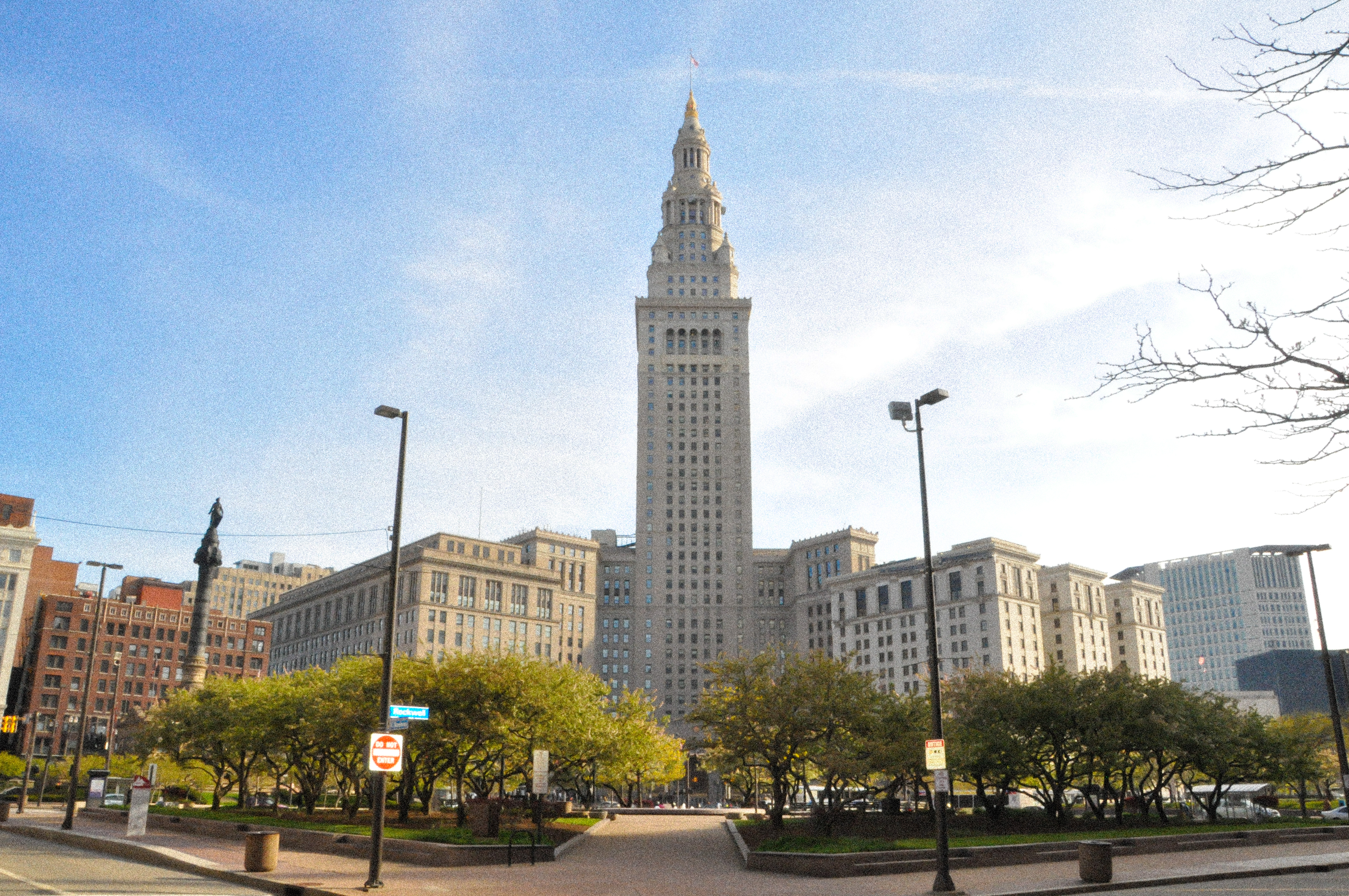
Hotel Cleveland, right, connected to Terminal Tower

The 1000-room Hotel Cleveland was built at a cost of $4.5 million and opened on December 16, 1918. Charles Lindbergh spoke in a ballroom at the hotel in 1927, three months after completing his solo Trans-Atlantic flight. The Van Sweringen brothers purchased the hotel in the 1920s and built the Cleveland Union Terminal complex, completed in 1930, around it.

Eliot Ness and his wife Evaline frequently danced in the hotel's famous Bronze Room during his time in Cleveland. Ness also questioned Francis Sweeney, a suspect in the Torso murders, in one of the hotel's rooms for over a week in 1938. The following year, in 1939, he held a meeting of local factory owners in the hotel's Empire Room, attempting to start a network of informants among their employees, to catch potential saboteurs. The local CIO head feared it was a union-busting ploy and asked J. Edgar Hoover to intervene. Hoover sided with the CIO and remained at odds with Ness through the remainder of his career. President Harry S. Truman and First Lady Eleanor Roosevelt were both guests at the hotel in the 1940s.

=== Sheraton-Cleveland Hotel ===
Sheraton Hotels acquired the Hotel Cleveland in 1958 and rechristened it the Sheraton-Cleveland Hotel. President Dwight D. Eisenhower delivered a series of speeches at the Sheraton on November 4, 1960, before giving a major speech in the adjacent Public Square. In 1961, Sheraton converted the Bronze Room to the Kon Tiki Restaurant. The restaurant has since been closed and the space has been converted to offices. In 1962, Sheraton spent $5.2 million renovating the hotel and adding an enormous adjacent convention wing structure containing a three-story, 500-space parking garage, topped by a 12,000 sq ft exhibition hall and a new grand ballroom accommodating 4000 people. A historic meeting between leaders of Cleveland's white and black communities occurred at the Sheraton on April 19, 1964, following the death of Civil Rights protester Rev. Bruce W. Klunder twelve days earlier.

The Beatles stayed at the Sheraton on September 14, 1964, before performing at the Public Auditorium the next day. Police established a cordon around the Sheraton to protect the group from mobs of fans, who surrounded the hotel. On March 23, 1965, Martin Luther King Jr. attended a Nobel Peace Prize dinner in his honor at the Sheraton, briefly leaving the Selma to Montgomery marches to be at the event. The Beatles returned in 1966, when they performed at Cleveland Stadium on August 14 and gave a press conference in the Sheraton's Empire Room that day. Duke Ellington gave a concert in the Sheraton Ballroom of the hotel on September 28, 1972. The hotel was added to the National Register of Historic Places on March 17, 1976 as part of the Terminal complex. President Gerald Ford visited the hotel on June 6, 1976 and gave a series of speeches and attended multiple receptions.

=== Restoration and today ===
In 1977, Sheraton sold the hotel, which now had only 800 rooms, to Save-the-Square, Inc. for $18 million. The group of investors, headed by Cleveland Browns owner Art Modell and also including Cleveland Indians owner Steve O'Neill, rescued the hotel from receivership and paid its debts. The group hired Biltmore Construction to fully renovate the aging hotel, enclosing the rear courtyard as a glass-roofed atrium, with a pool that had to be lowered into place by a huge crane. It reopened in 1978, managed by Stouffer Hotels, as Stouffer's Inn on the Square. Ronald Reagan visited the hotel on October 29, 1980, prior to participating in a presidential debate against Jimmy Carter at Public Auditorium. Boxer Larry Holmes fought a series of exhibition bouts in the hotel's Grand Ballroom on April 9, 1982. Cast and crew of the classic 1983 film A Christmas Story stayed at the hotel while filming in the adjacent Higbee's department store.

In 1985, Stouffer began a $37 million, five-year renovation, throughout which the hotel remained open. The renovation reduced the number of rooms to 500 and modernized the fire safety systems with sprinklers, smoke detectors and alarms. In December 1986, the hotel was renamed Stouffer Tower City Plaza Hotel, to match the renovated train station and its shopping mall. Renaissance Hotels purchased Stouffer Hotels in 1993, and the hotel became the Stouffer Renaissance Cleveland Hotel. In 1996, the Stouffer branding was retired and the hotel became the Renaissance Cleveland Hotel. In 2015, Toronto-based Skyline Investments purchased the property for $20 million.

In September 2021, Skyline announced plans to renovate the hotel and move it from Marriott's Renaissance Hotel division to the company's Autograph Collection, with the hotel regaining its historic name, Hotel Cleveland. In December 2021, Toronto-based VM Hotel Acquisition Corp announced plans to purchase the Renaissance Cleveland and the Hyatt Regency Cleveland from Skyline, but in May 2022 they pulled out of the deal, citing "market volatility." The hotel was renamed Hotel Cleveland, Autograph Collection in Spring 2024, as the $90 million renovations neared completion. It celebrated its grand reopening in June 2024.

== Gallery ==
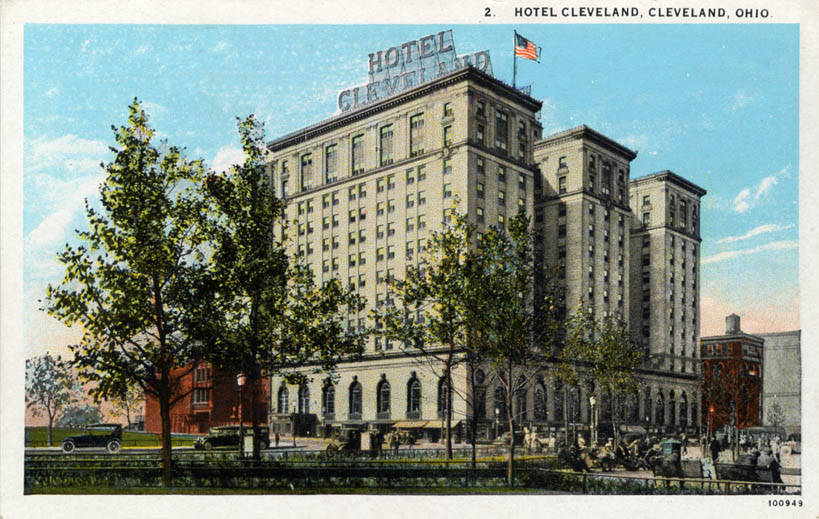
Hotel Cleveland, c. 1924

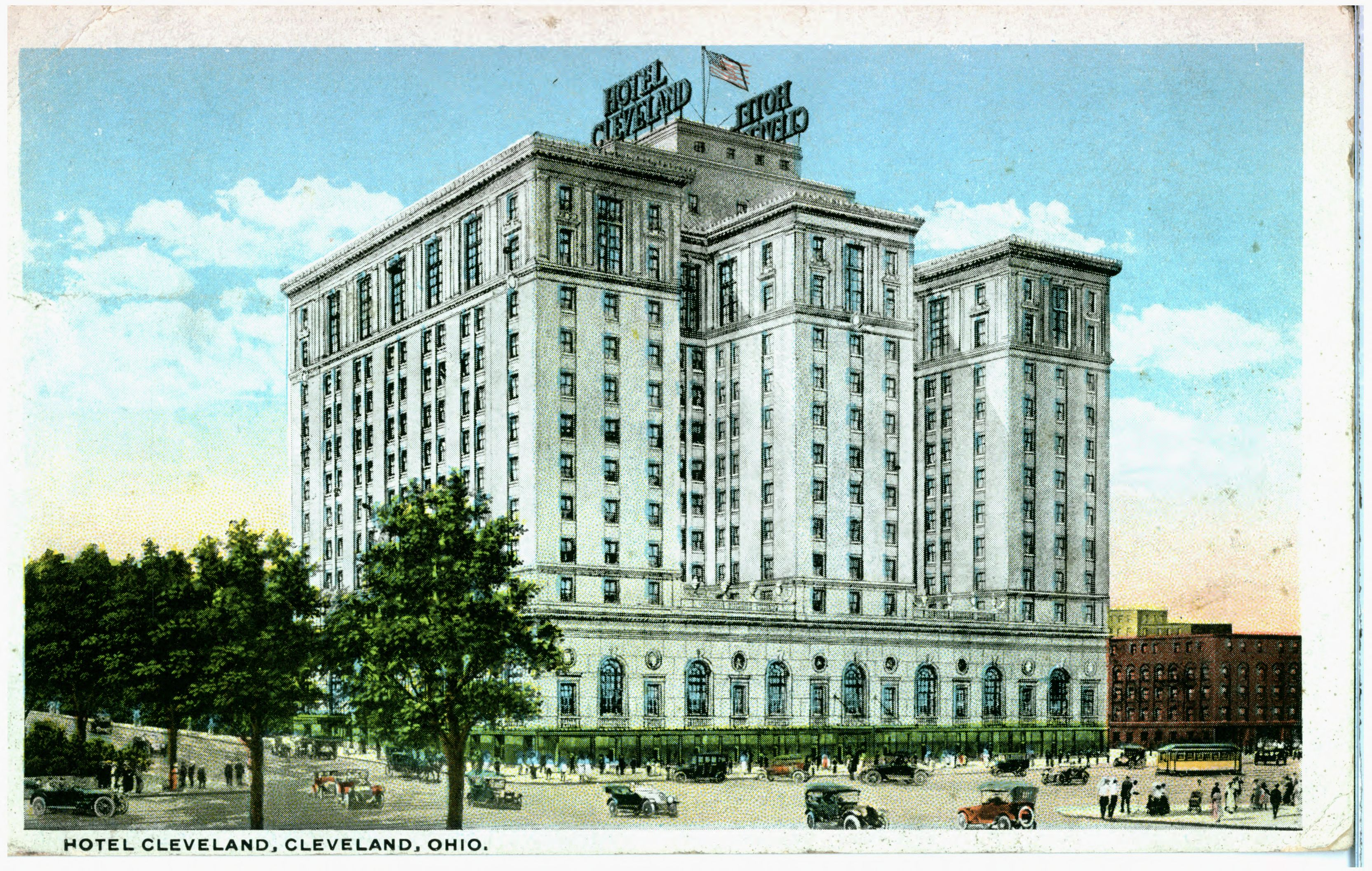
Hotel Cleveland, c. 1920

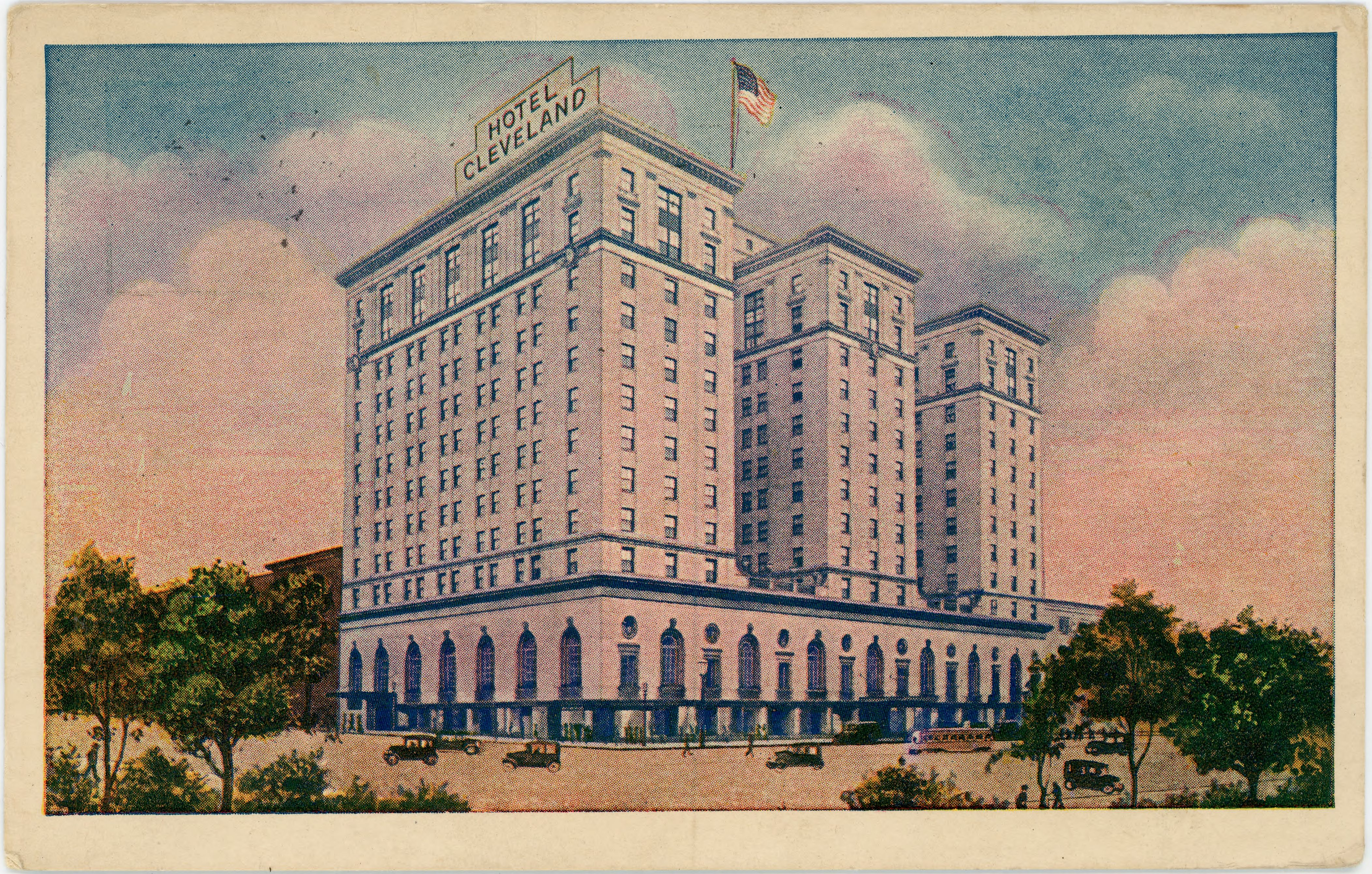
Hotel Cleveland, c. 1925

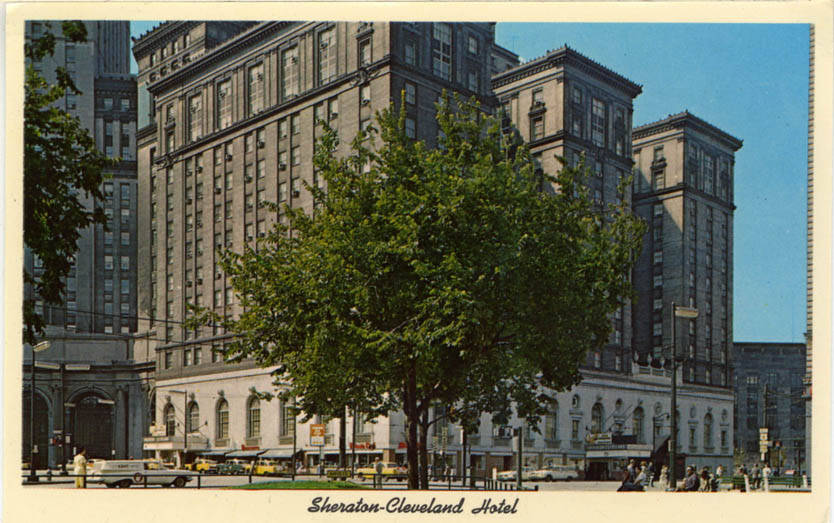
Sheraton-Cleveland Hotel, c. 1960

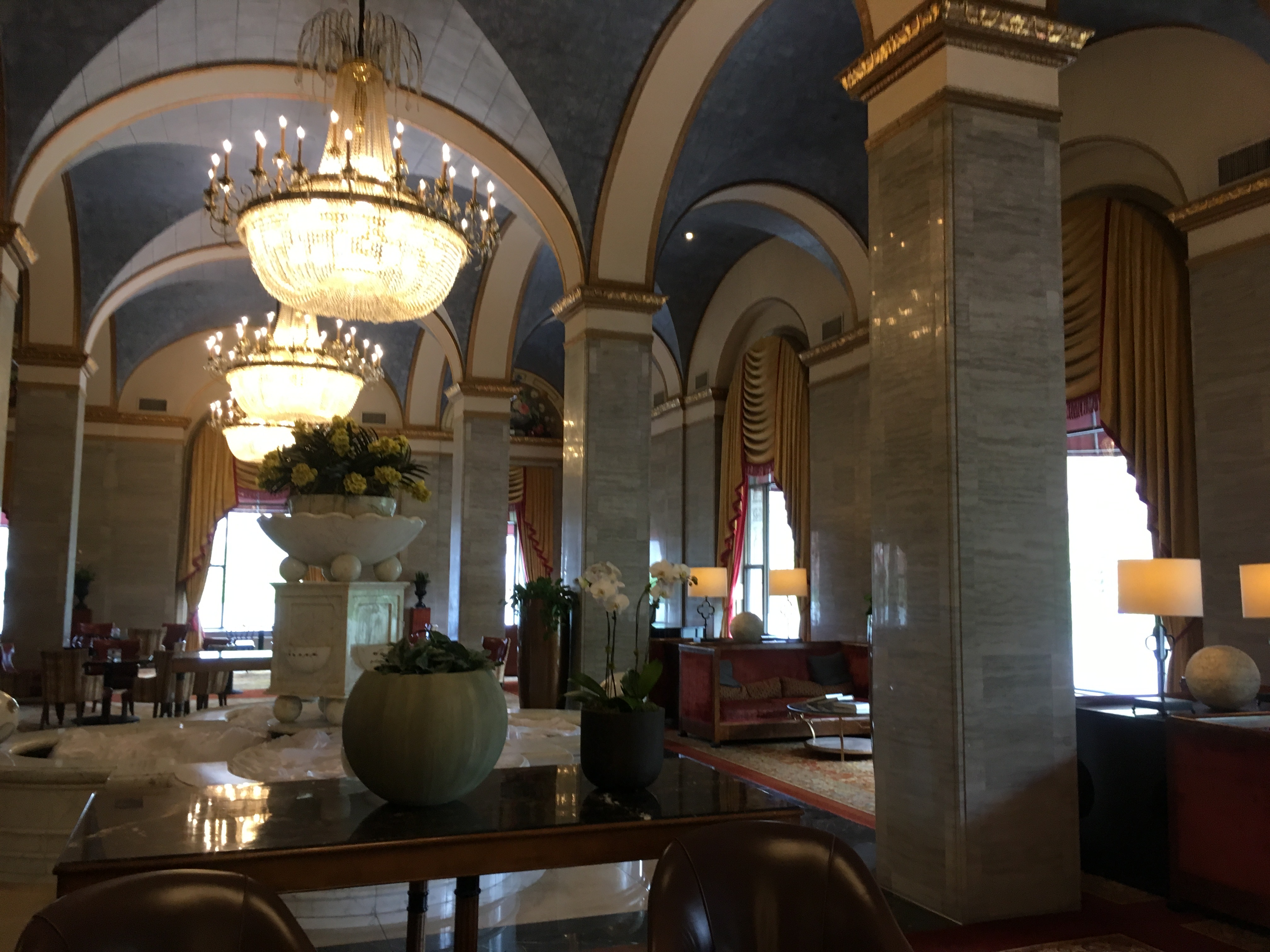
Hotel lobby, 2018

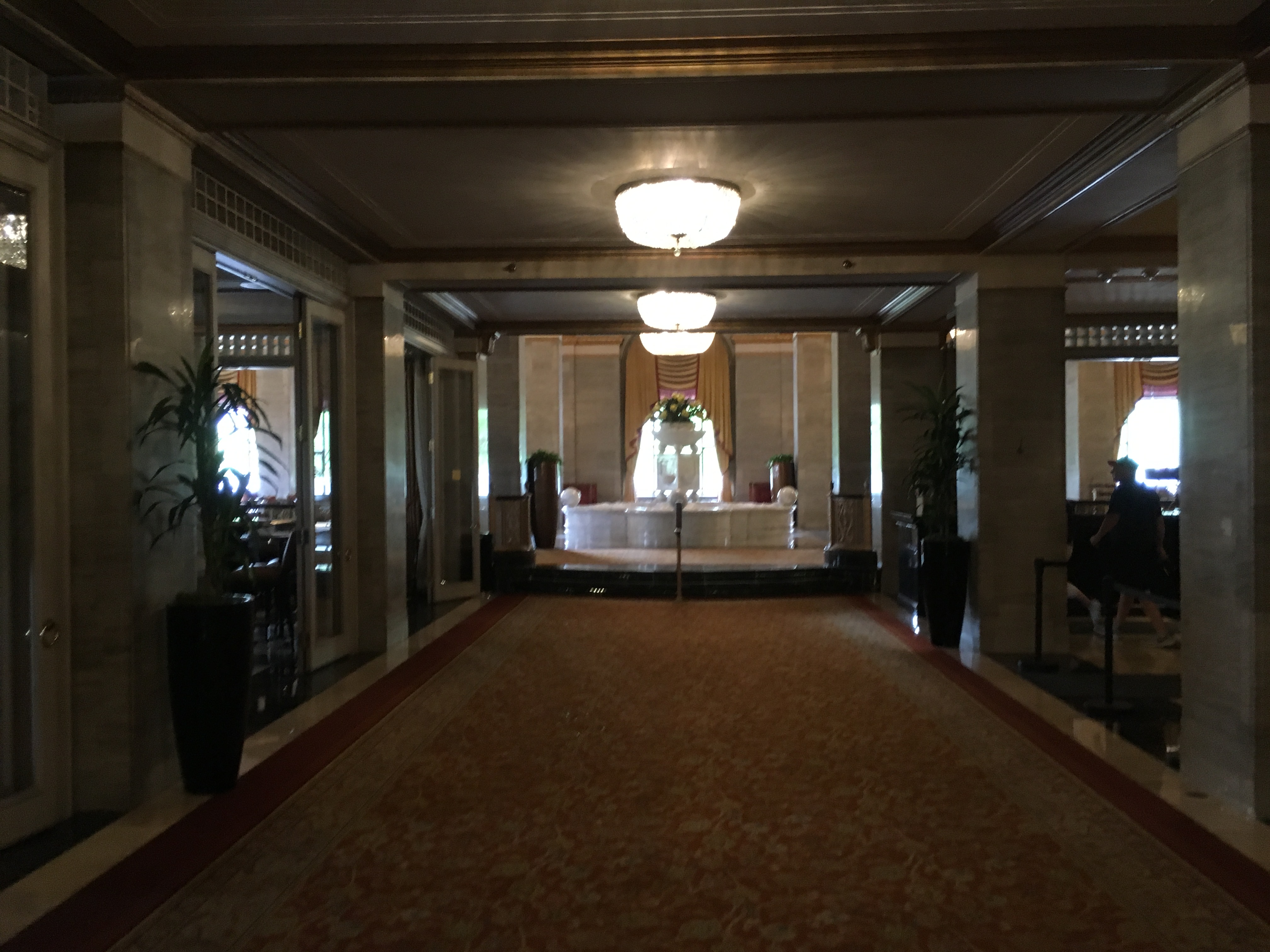
Lobby corridor, 2018

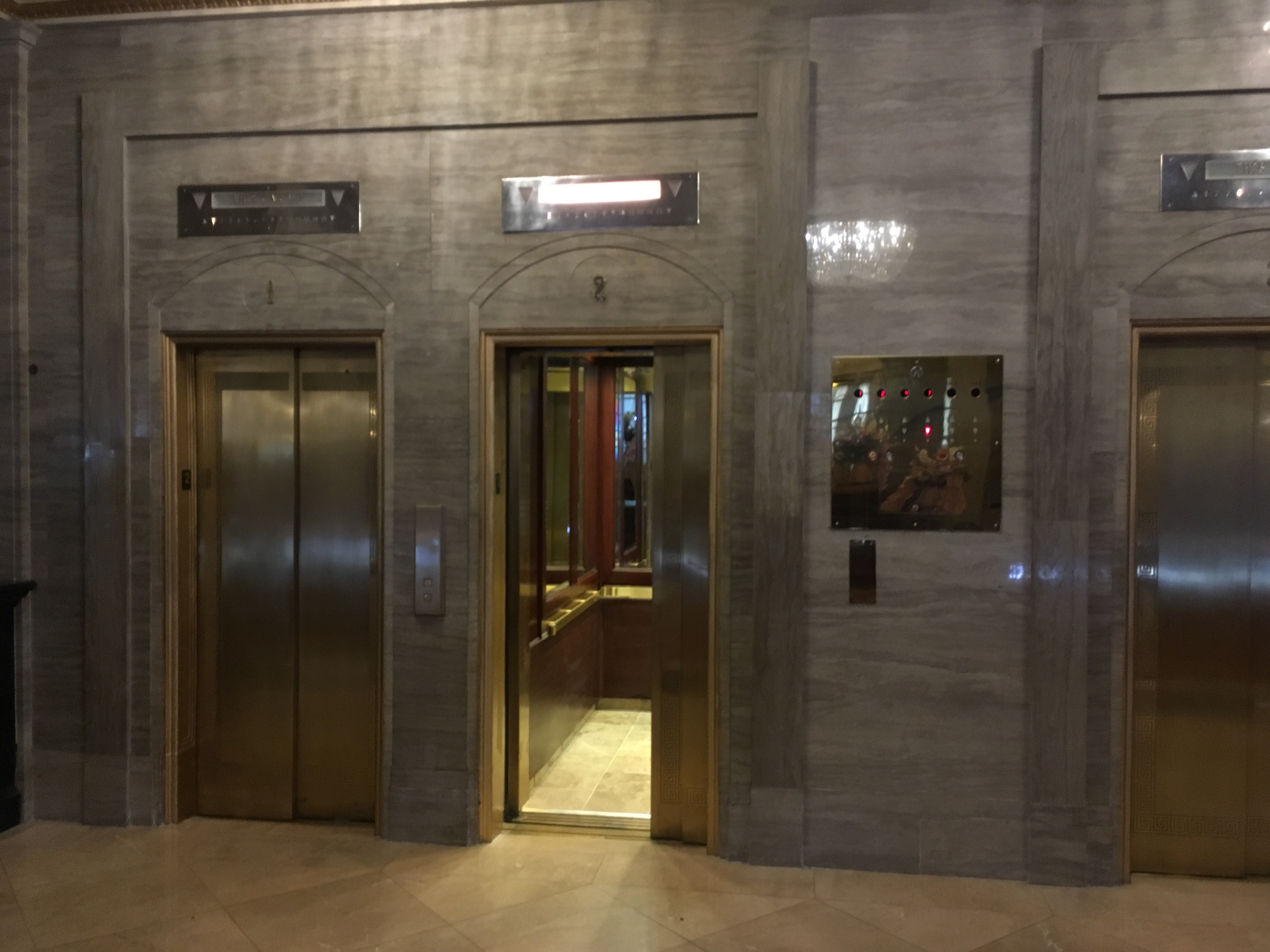
Guest floor elevator lobby, 2018

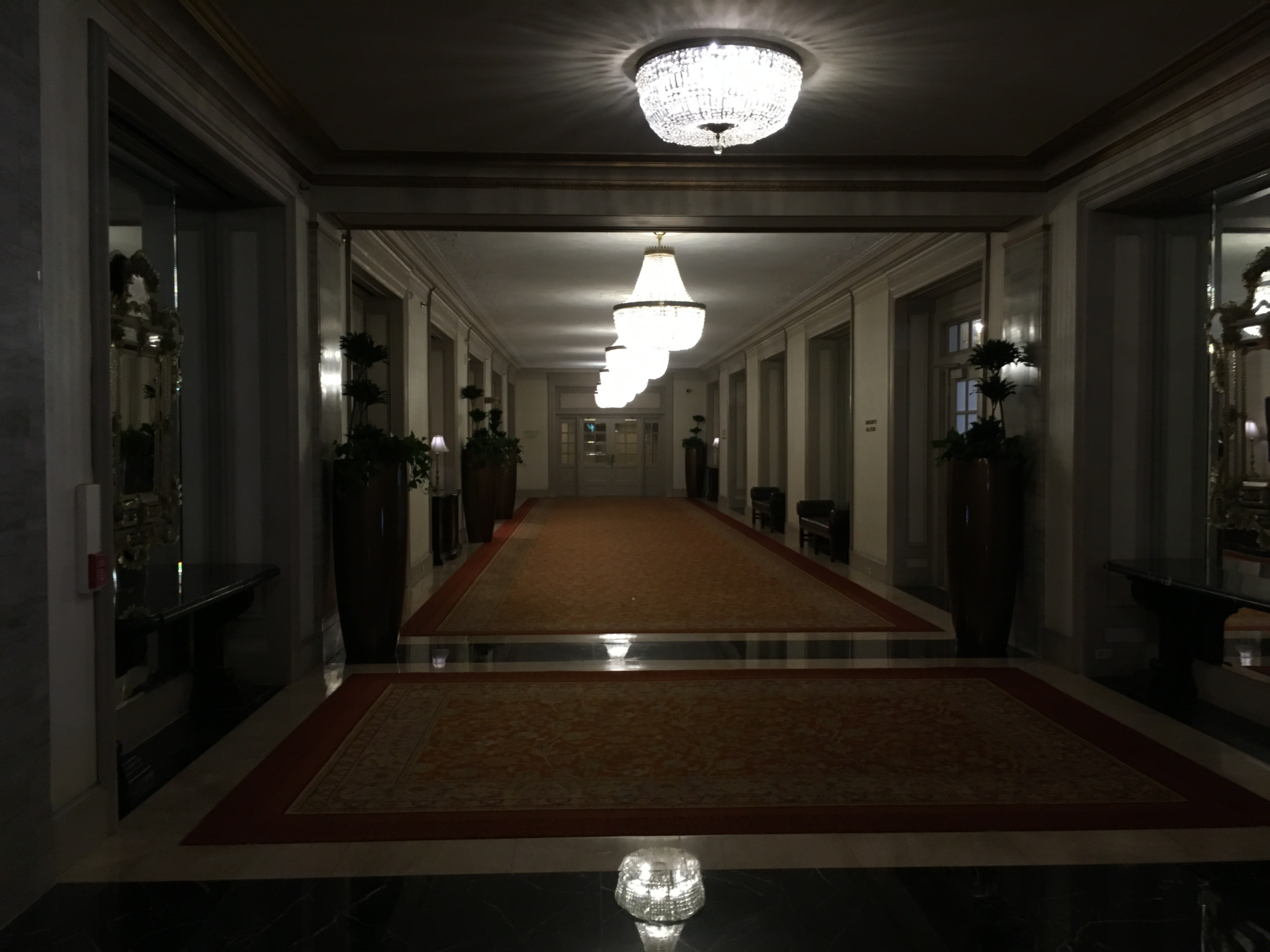
Lobby corridor, 2018

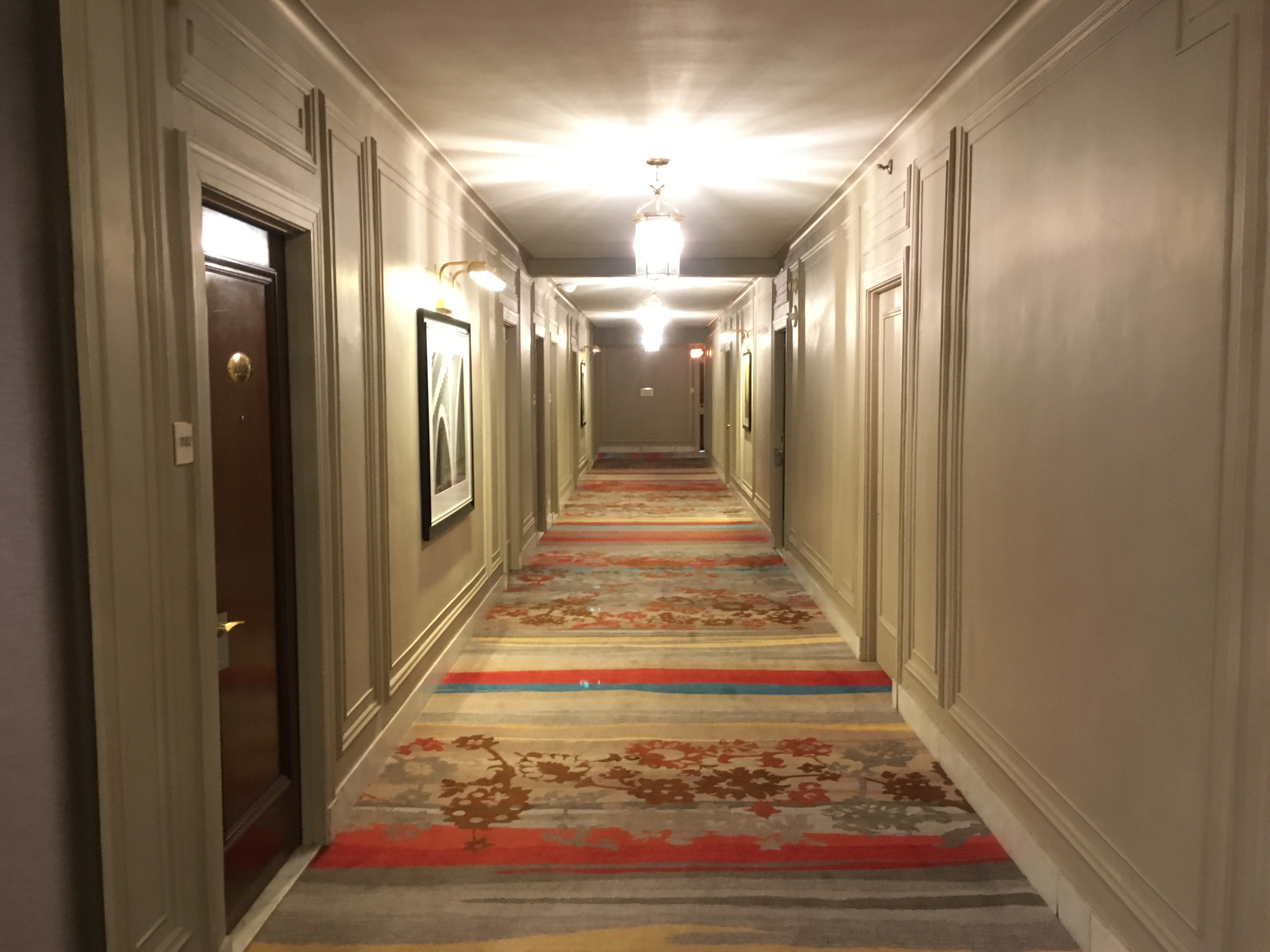
Guest Floor Corridor, 2018

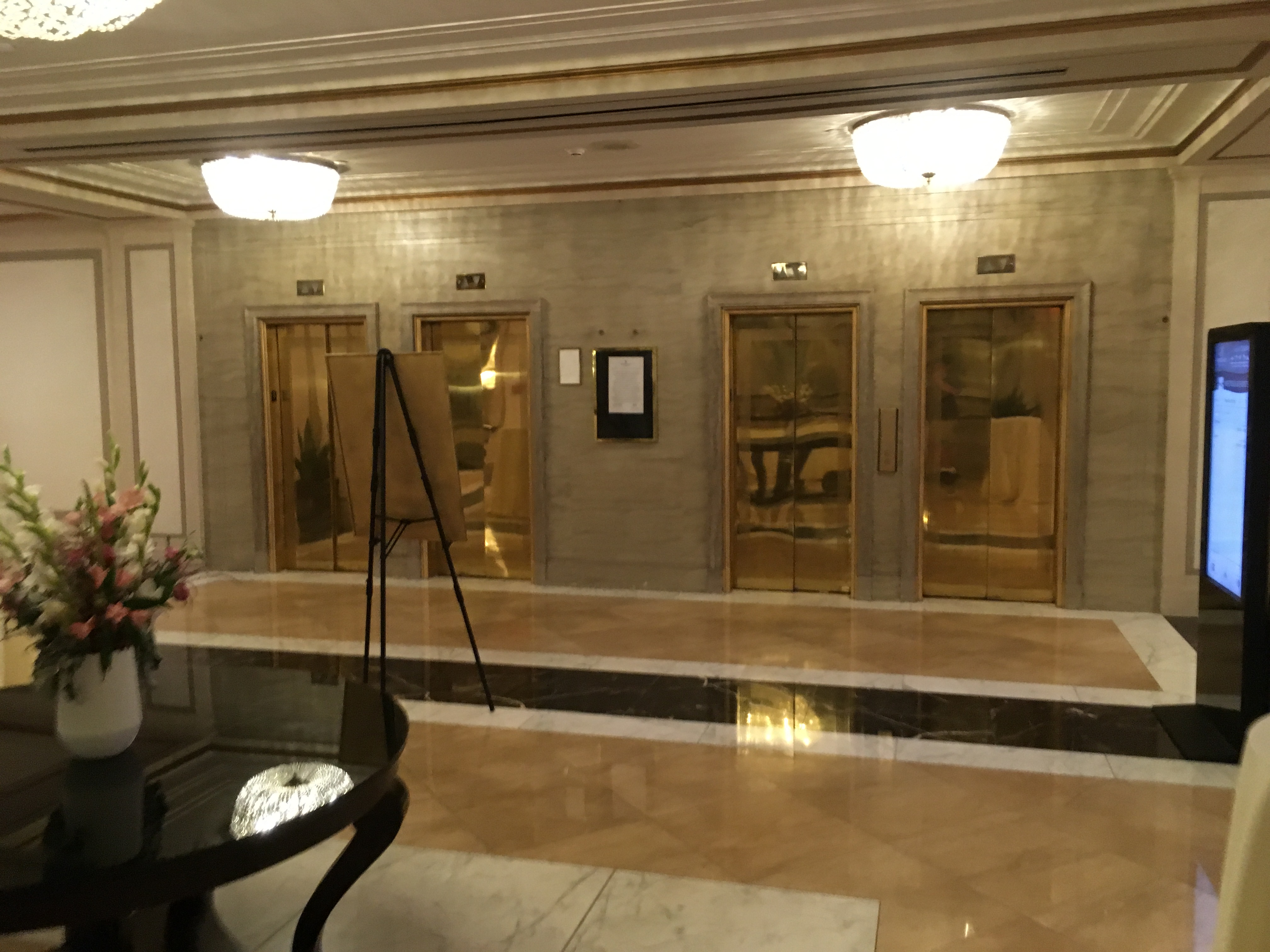
Elevator Lobby, 2018

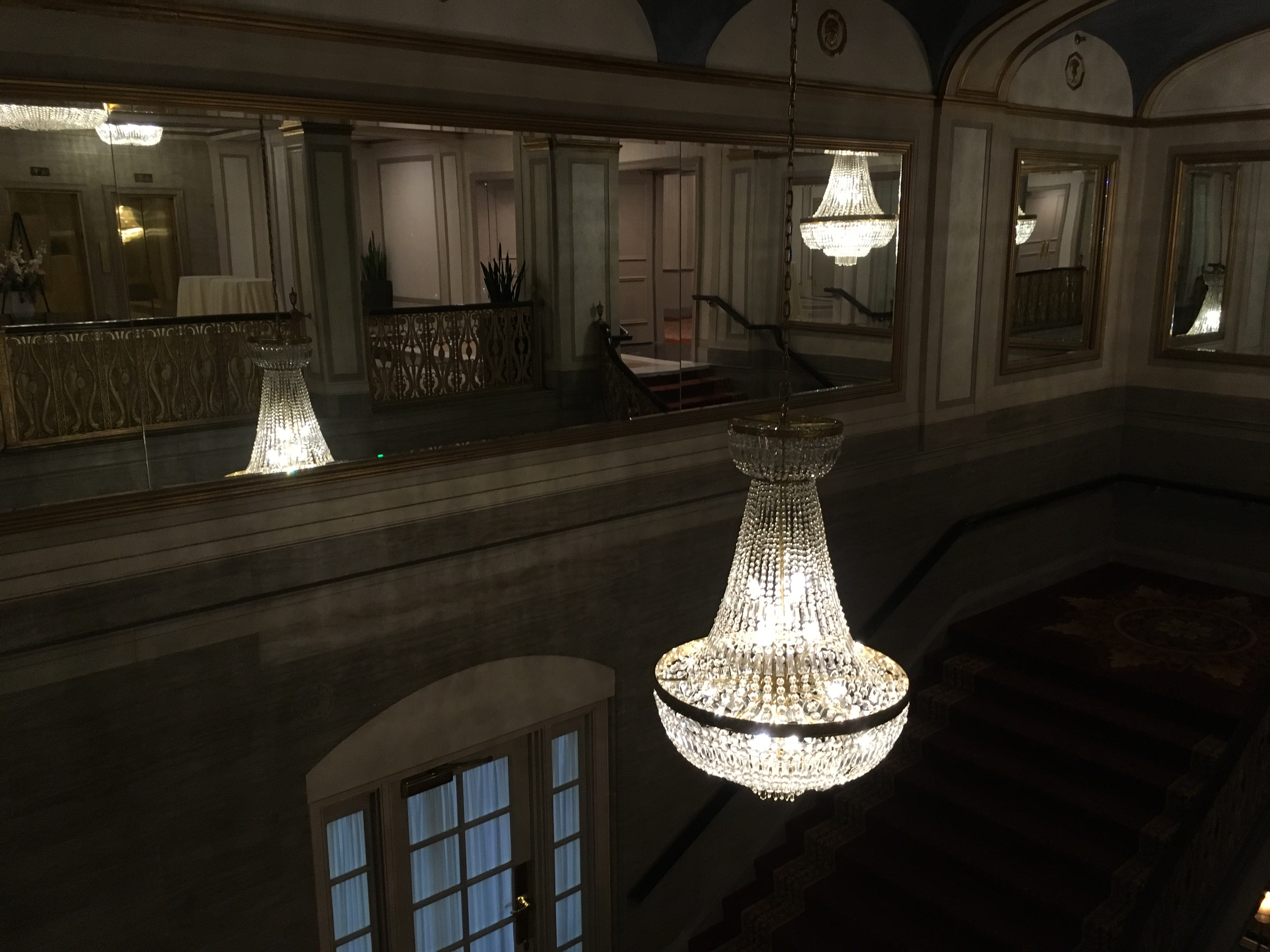
Entrance Stairway, 2018

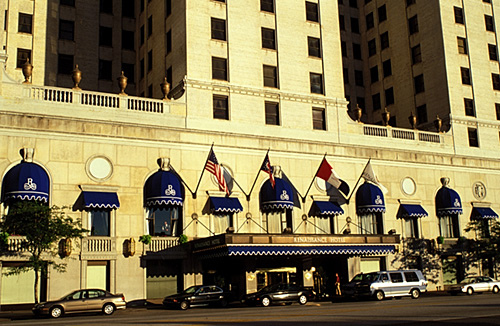
Hotel entrance, 2007

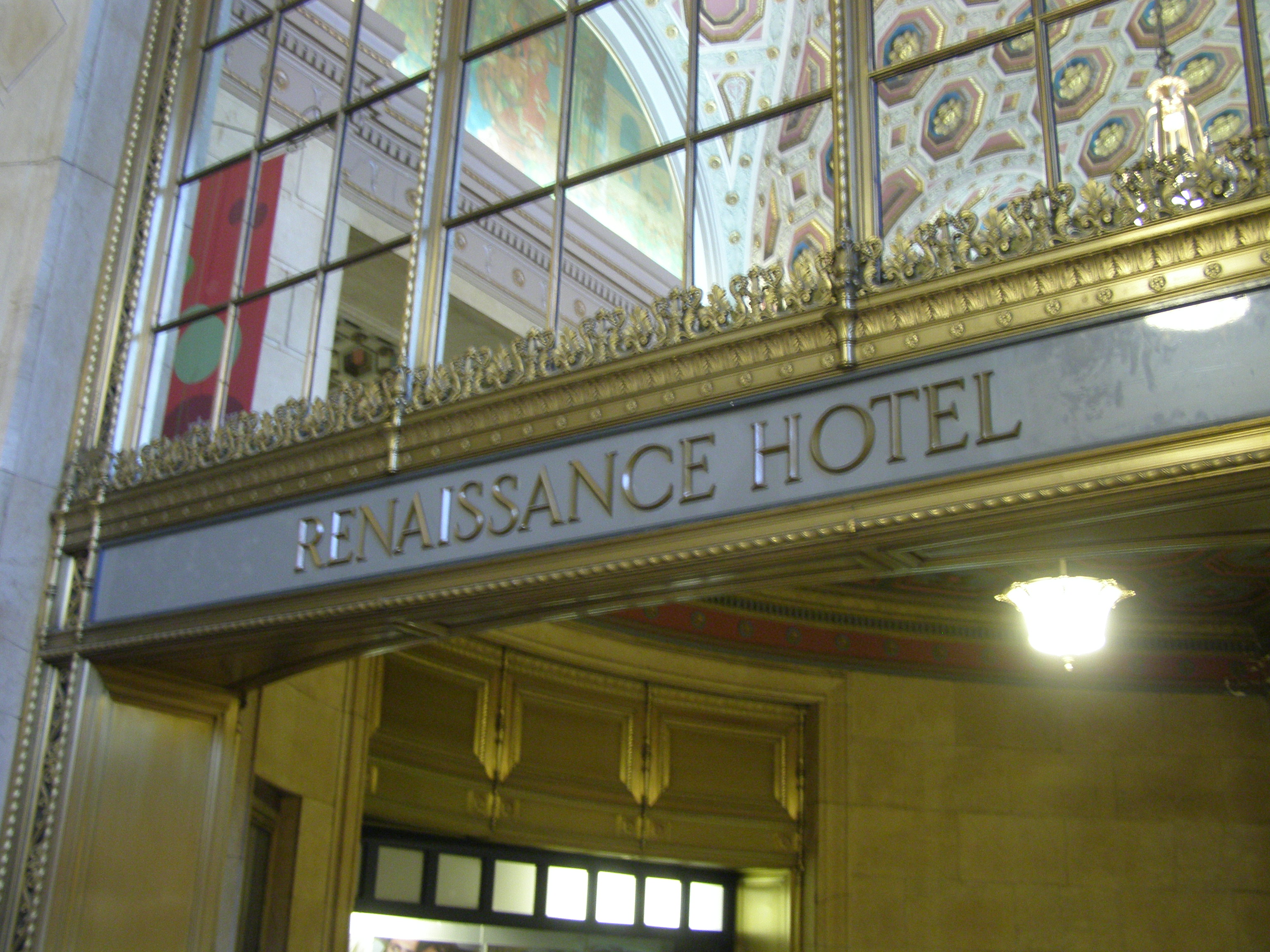
Entrance from Terminal Tower, 2010

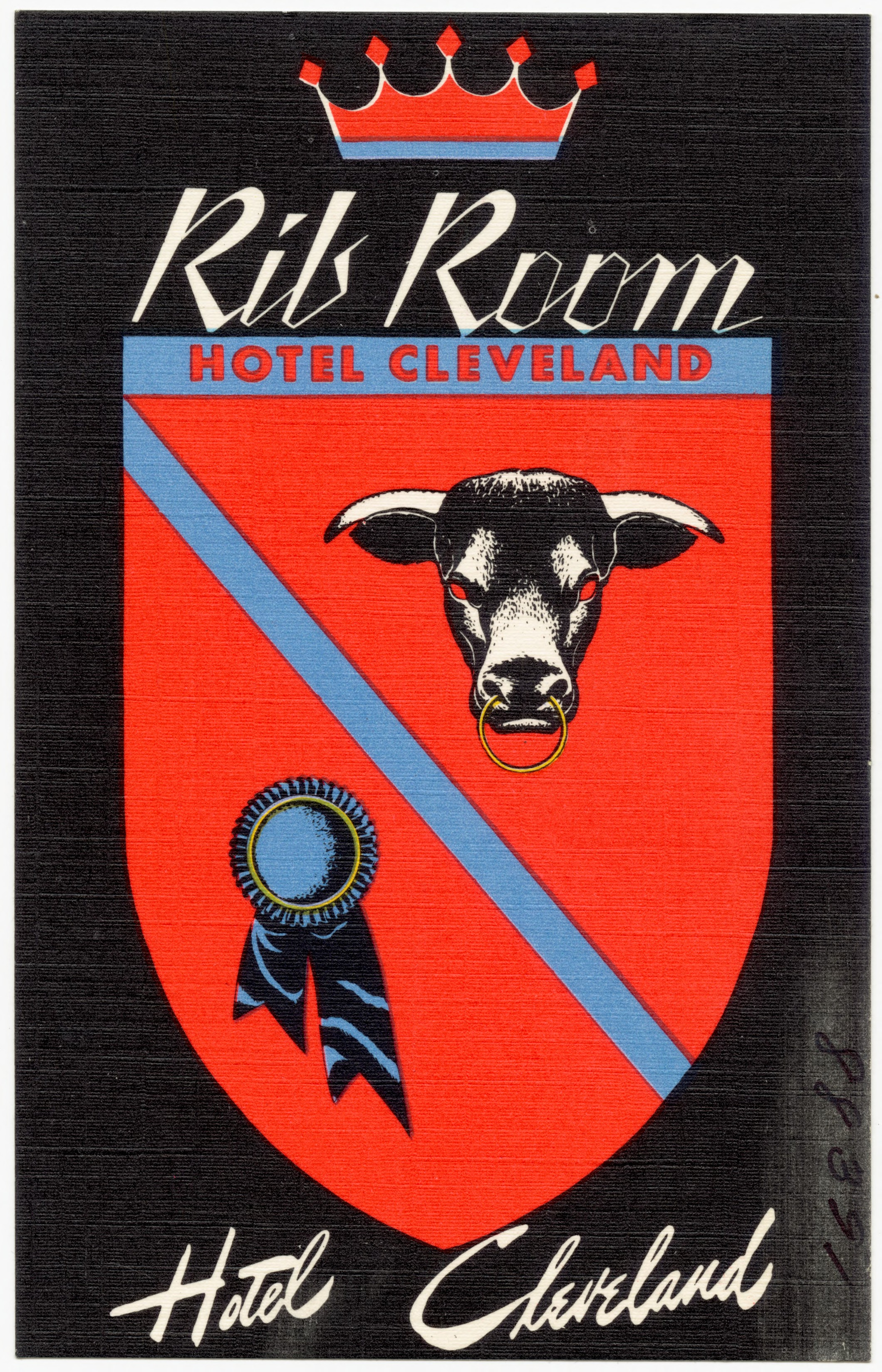
Hotel Cleveland, Rib Room restaurant logo, 1930s

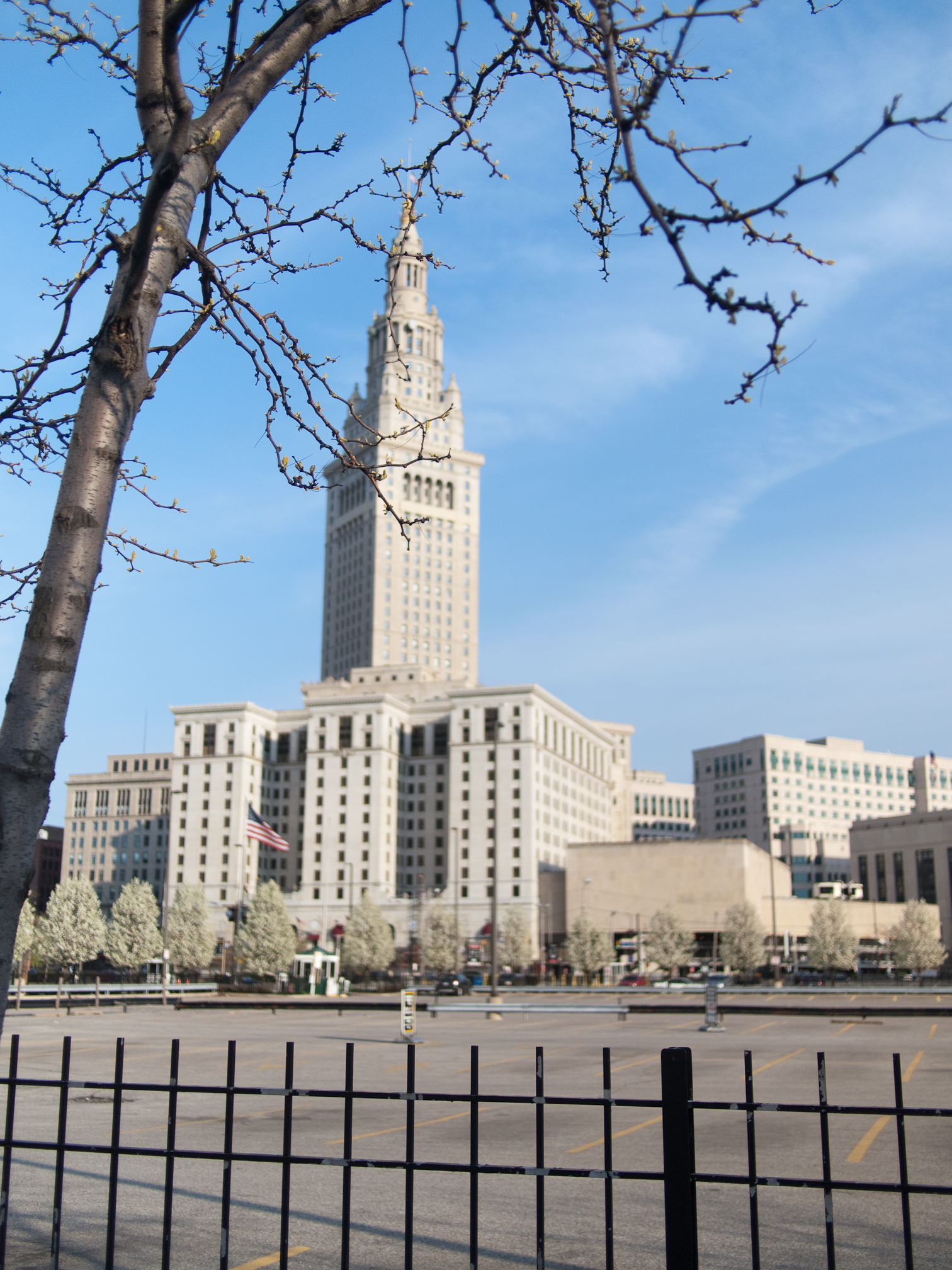
Hotel exterior, 2010

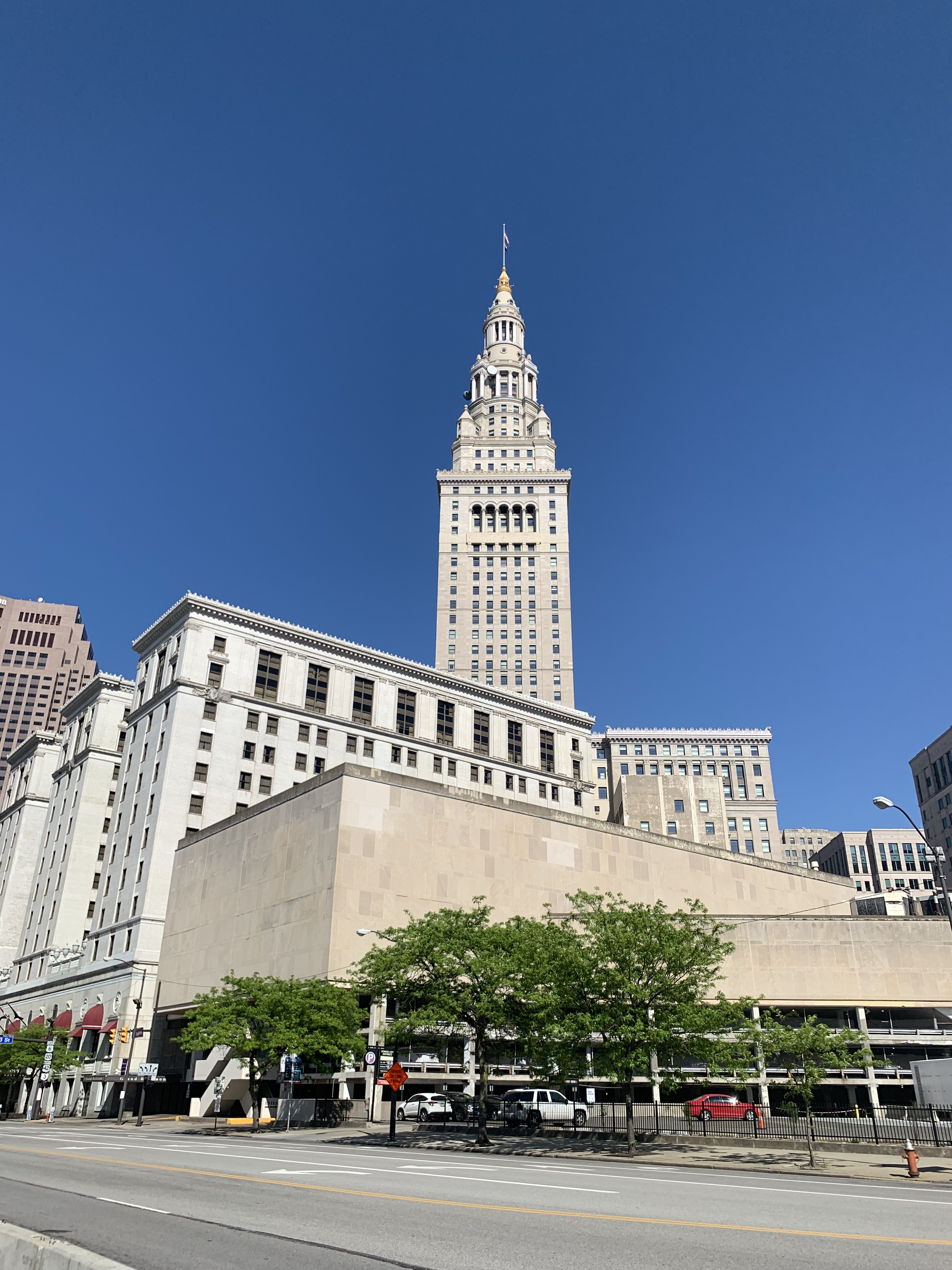
Hotel exterior, showing 1962 wing in foreground, 2022

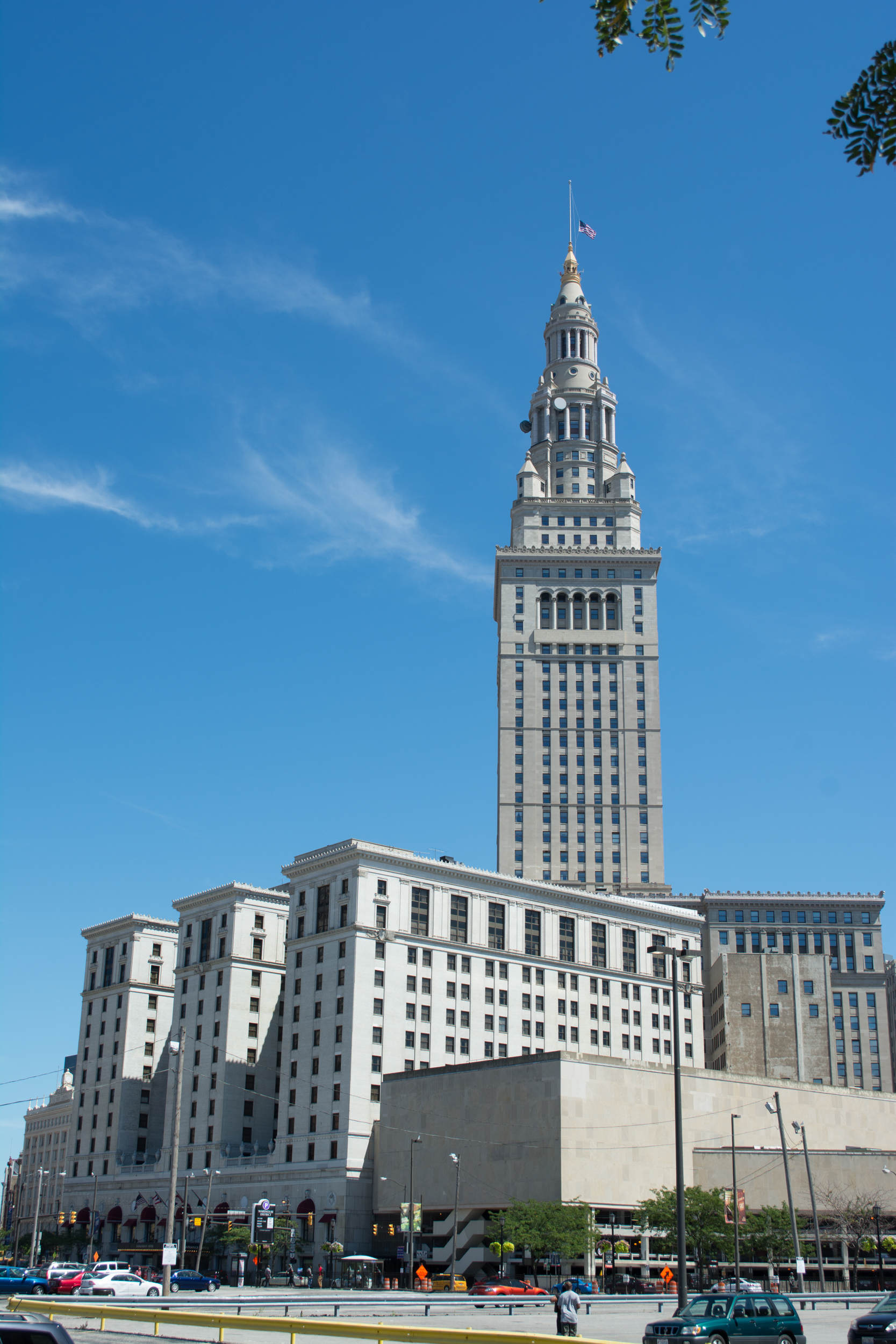
Hotel Exterior 2015

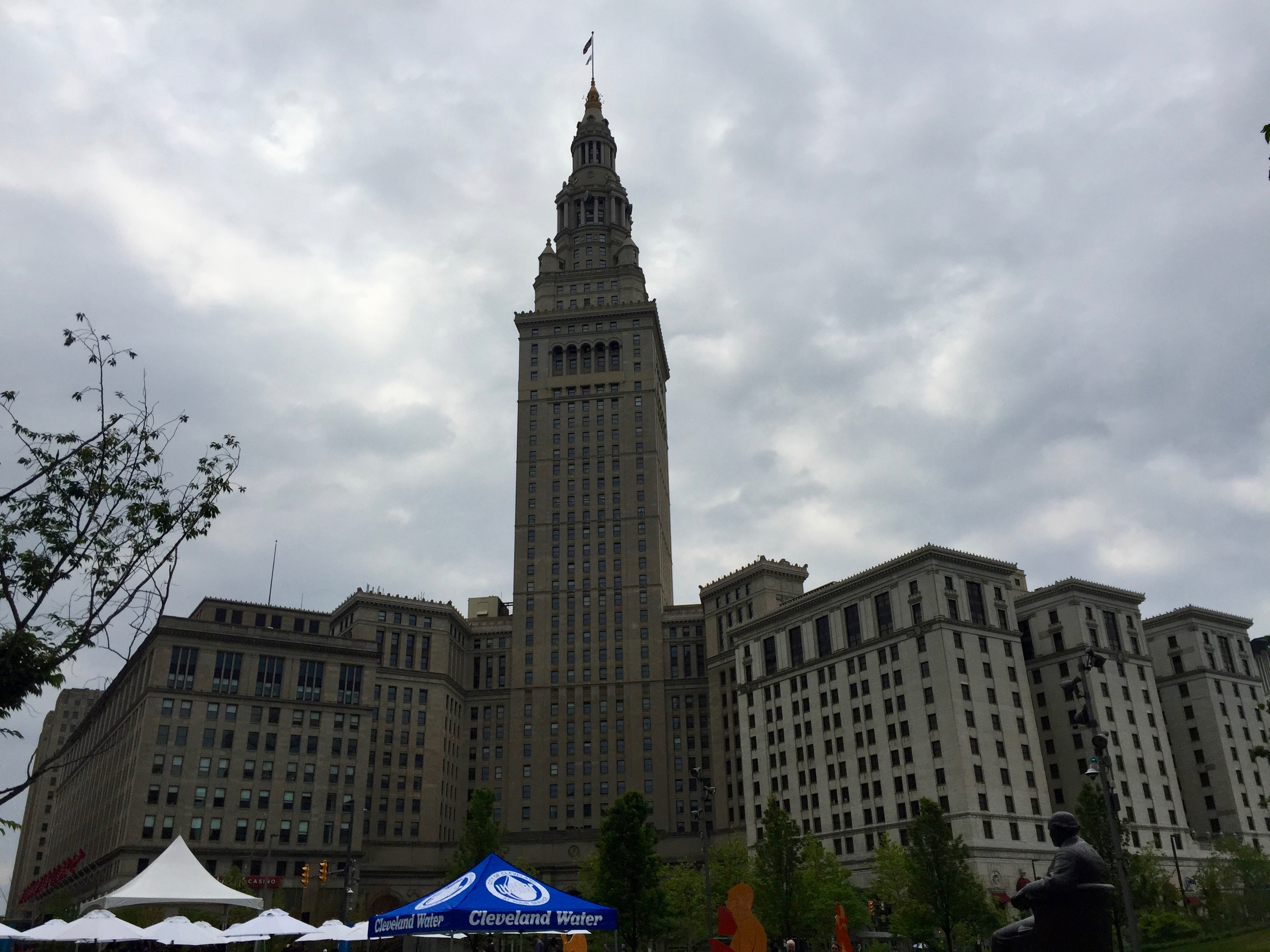
Tower City Center, 2018

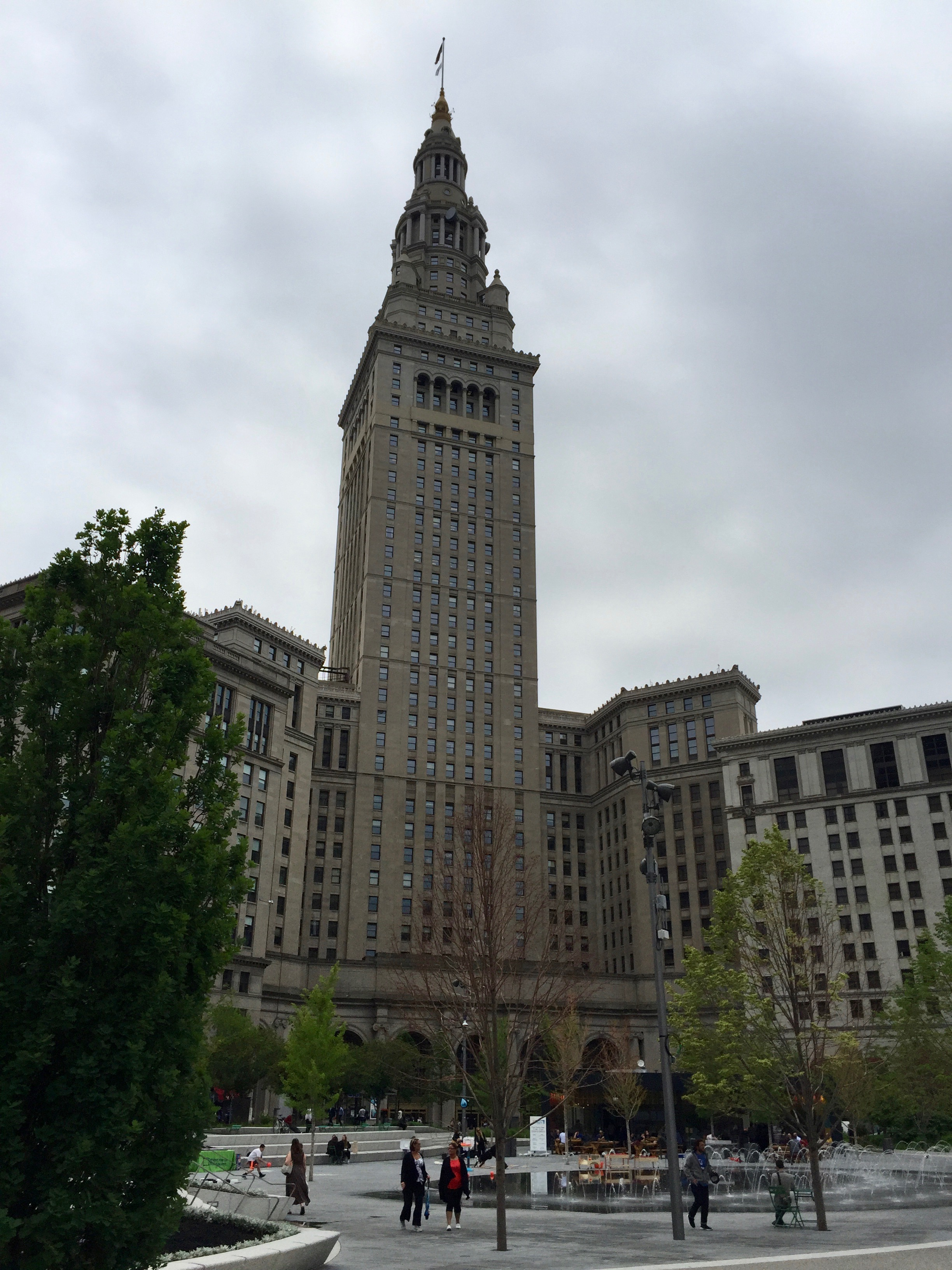
Tower City Center, 2018

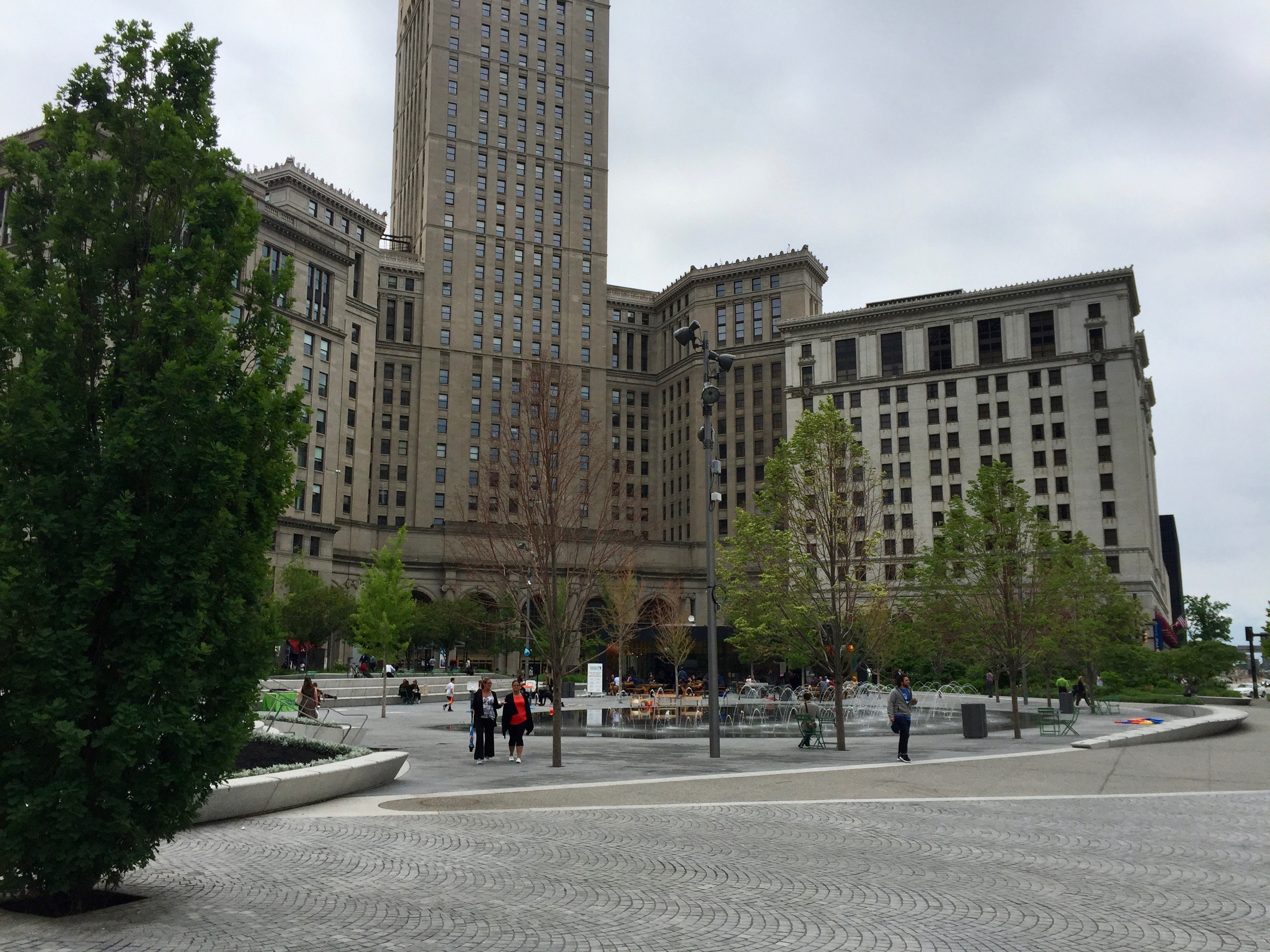
Tower City Center, 2018
