= Skyline Investments =

- Industry: Real estate
- Founded: 1998
- Headquarters: Toronto, Canada
- Website: www.skylineinvestments.com

Skyline Investments is a Canadian company. It is the Canadian division of Mishorim Development and is based in Toronto, Canada. Skyline is currently a public company with the ticker symbol SKLN. Operating throughout Canada, particularly in Ontario, Skyline focuses on real estate, hospitality, community development, and various other areas. In Ontario, Skyline owns and manages Deerhurst Resort & Village in Muskoka and Horseshoe Resort & Village, although it intends to sell the property as of 2021.

== History ==
Skyline began operating in Canada in 1998.

In the 2010s, Skyline worked on rebuilding the 12,000-acre (4,900 ha) Port McNicoll site in Ontario, Canada.

In 2011, Skyline International Developments Inc. (now Skyline Investments Inc.) bought the SS Keewatin, Skyline Investments is also the owner of Keewatin and surrounding development properties in Canada.

Gil Blutrich served as the director until July 2020. Alex Shnaider assumed control of the company starting in late 2020.

Skyline (ticker symbol: SKLN) also trades on the Tel Aviv Stock Exchange (TASE) The majority of Mishorim Development's operations are conducted through Skyline.

== See also ==
- Mishorim Development
- Midland Group
- Port McNicoll, Ontario
