= Mishorim Development =

Israeli real-estate company

- Industry: Real estate
- Founded: 1990
- Founder: Gil Blutrich
- Headquarters: Tel Aviv, Israel
- Owner: Alex Shnaider
- Website: mishorim.com

Mishorim Development Ltd. is an Israeli company that was founded by Gil Blutrich in 1990. The current owner is Alex Shnaider. It is a public company traded at the Tel Aviv Stock Exchange (ticker symbol: MSHR) as of 2021. The company owns many historic sites and buildings in various countries, such as the town of Port McNicoll, Horseshoe Resort, King Edward Hotel, and Skyline Tower in Canada, as well as parts of the SunTrust International Center in Miami, United States.

== Overview ==
One of Mishorim's main focus areas is the US commercial sector, where it invests in a wide variety of properties in cities such as Miami. In downtown Miami, Mishorim has proposed a mixed-used dual-tower project called Mishorim Towers.

Skyline International Development Inc. is the Canadian division of Mishorim.

Mishorim has also invested in proposed properties such as the Sapphire Tower in Toronto, Canada. The INDX Tower ended up being built instead of the proposed Sapphire Tower. The 51-floor 179 metres (587 ft) INDX Tower was completed in 2016, although it was not as high as the previously planned Sapphire Tower.

Mishorim also operates throughout Israel, where it manages various outdoor centers in suburban areas.

== History ==
In 1990, Gil Blutrich founded Mishorim in Israel. On 30 December 2015, Alex Shnaider invested NIS₪39 million in Mishorim Development Ltd., a real estate company controlled by developer Gil Blutrich. As of July 2016, he held 42% of the company. Shnaider is currently the sole holder of controlling interest when an Israeli court ruled in favor of him in August 2020, in a legal lawsuit filed by his past partner Gil Blutrich.

Mishorim owns Skyline Investments, a publicly traded hotel operator, as of 2021.

== Skyline Investments ==
Skyline Investments is the Canadian division of Mishorim and is based in Toronto, Canada. It is currently a public company with the ticker symbol SKLN. Operating throughout Canada, Skyline focuses on real estate, hospitality, community development, and various other areas. In Ontario, Skyline owns and manages Deerhurst Resort & Village in Muskoka and Horseshoe Resort & Village.

In the 2010s, Skyline worked on rebuilding the 12,000-acre (4,900 ha) Port McNicoll site in Ontario, Canada.

In 2011, Skyline International Developments Inc. (now Skyline Investments Inc.) bought the SS Keewatin, Skyline Investments is also the owner of Keewatin and surrounding development properties in Canada.

== See also ==
- Midland Group
- Port McNicoll, Ontario
