= Georgian Bay and Seaboard Railway =

Overview
- Locale: Ontario, Canada
- Dates of operation: 1908–1993

Technical
- Track gauge: 4 ft 8 1/2 in (1,435 mm) standard gauge
- Length: 141 km

The Georgian Bay and Seaboard Railway (GB&S) was a former short-line railway in Ontario, Canada, owned and operated by Canadian Pacific Railway (CPR). The first sections opened in 1908, and the entire 140 kilometres (87 mi) route was fully completed in 1912.

The GB&S was designed to compete with the Ottawa, Arnprior and Parry Sound Railway (OA&PS). Both acted as trans-shipment points between lakers on the upper Great Lakes and Atlantic ports in the east, especially grain shipments from the Canadian prairies to docks in Montreal and the east coast. CPR had originally planned to run a line almost parallel to the OA&PS, but lost an important court case and were forced to build the line much further south than intended. To service the new route, CPR built Port McNicoll on Georgian Bay outside Midland. From here the line ran east-southeast to connect to the CPR's Ontario and Quebec Railway mainline for shipment further east.

The GB&S had a short lifetime as a complete line. CPR abandoned the section between Orillia and Lindsay in 1937 at the height of the Great Depression when the lake trade crashed. The section between Port McNicoll and the CP mainlines at Coldwater were used until 1971, under the guise of the Port McNicoll Subdivision. The section from Lindsay to the mainlines, part of the Bobcaygeon Subdivision, closed in 1987. The lines on docks in Port McNicoll closed in 1992, along with most of the ports on Georgian Bay. The final section serving a limestone quarry in Uhthoff was used as a spur until 1993.

Some sections of the line have been re-used for local roads, rail trails and other purposes, but the majority has returned to farmland.

== History ==
=== Background ===
Completion of the CRP lines to Fort William in northwestern Ontario near the western end of Lake Superior allowed grain from the entire prairies area to reach the upper Great Lakes. Although there were numerous plans to build connecting lines to the Toronto and Ottawa areas, before these were completed most of this traffic was transshipped to lake freighters ("lakers").

To serve this trade, Canadian Pacific starting operating a fleet of lakers in the 1880s under the Canadian Pacific Railway Upper Lake Service. A number of these were mixed passenger/freight designs, and were fitted in the fashion of the Edwardian era - floating palaces of wood, silver and glass. They had originally been intended as a stop-gap measure to provide passenger service while the railway line was completed along the northern shore of Superior, but they proved to be a profitable operation in their own right, and would operate until 1965.

Prior to the opening of the widened Welland Canal in 1932, lakers could only easily navigate as far as Lake Erie before offloading to trains. Offloading in Erie was not ideal for Canadian cargo, as trains from that area would have to travel through the already congested Toronto area. A much shorter and more practical route was to offload the ships in Georgian Bay, far north of Toronto, and then ship directly east from there. This took 450 miles off the route eastward.

At the time, the closest port accessible by the CPR was in Owen Sound, where a busy port connected to the Toronto, Grey and Bruce Railway (TG&B), which CP had gained control of in July 1883. This was originally a narrow-gauge line with a somewhat circuitous route that ended west of Toronto, meaning that shipments moving east had to travel through these already congested lines. This southbound route also did little to reduce the overall distance compared to ports on Erie.

=== A&NW vs. OA&PS ===
A more suitable port location was Parry Sound, home to the world's deepest natural freshwater port. It is also one of the most eastern points on the upper lakes, as well as the shortest straight-line distance to the many rail lines that already ran to the Ottawa area.

CP's first attempt to address the lake trade was an 1891 plan to extend the Atlantic and North-West Railway (A&NW) to Parry Sound from its existing terminus outside Ottawa at Renfrew. Similar plans had been floated several times for various reasons, but had come to nothing. The CPR was not the only company interested in railways in the area; John Rudolphus Booth had purchased enormous tracts of land in central Ontario for logging purposes and was planning a line to allow timber shipments to his mills in downtown Ottawa. These plans solidified as the Ottawa, Arnprior and Parry Sound Railway (OA&PS), initially chartered in 1888. (Note: The line was initially in two halves, but later amalgamated in 1891.)

During this same period the Northern and Pacific Junction Railway (N&PJ) had started pushing northward from Gravenhurst toward Callander and would pass by Parry Sound some distance to the east. Business interests in town formed the Parry Sound Colonization Railway (PSCR) to build a short line from the town to connect to the N&PJ near Burk's Falls. Moving the connection point slightly south to Scotia Junction, they starting construction westward from the N&PJ in 1886. The crews had reached only about halfway to the town when the company ran out of funds.

In 1892 CPR expressed an interest in purchasing and completing the PSCR as the last leg of its A&NW route from Ottawa. Booth swept in and purchased the line out from under them. This action led to a series of tit-for-tat events between the two railways. The CPR was soon making public statements about their plans to build a parallel route to Booth's, and beat his line into service. When Booth's line reached Renfrew, a fight reportedly broke out between rival construction crews.

Booth ultimately won the contest due to a wrangle over a narrow valley passage west of Killaloe. A lawsuit between the OA&PS and CPR followed, of which the CPR lost. Rails had already been run on the 19 mile section from Renfrew to Eganville, but the bulk of the proposed 186 mile route was abandoned without any construction taking place. Booth's OA&PS would go on to be the busiest line in Canada, at one point handling as much as 40% of the Canadian grain trade.

=== Other routes ===
The CPR did not abandon their plans for a lake port, and started looking for other suitable locations.

One possible solution presented itself in the form of the Montreal, Ottawa & Georgian Bay Canal, which started planning in 1894. The canal would connect Georgian Bay to Lake Nipissing along the French River, and from there, via Trout Lake and Lake Talon, to the Madawaska River and on to the Ottawa River. CPR's mainlines met the proposed route on Lake Nipissing in North Bay, allowing them to pick up the cargo at any point along the line. However, when this route was examined in detail, the price tag was placed at approximately $100 million, and the plans were abandoned.

Just to the south of Parry Sound are two inlets on Georgian Bay with several protected harbours. The southern inlet was already home to the major ports at Owen Sound and Collingwood. These were well served by existing railways; both the GT, Georgian Bay & Lake Erie and the Toronto, Grey & Bruce served the port at Owen Sound, while the Hamilton & Northwestern and Ontario, Simcoe & Huron served Collingwood.

For CPR's purposes these ports had two major problems. One was that the rail lines all ran south, where they connected to mainlines that ran through Toronto and switched near Bathurst Street. Only one of the lines in the southern Ontario area avoided Toronto and was ideally placed; the Midland Railway of Canada (MR) ran around the eastern side of Lake Simcoe and connected to the Lake Ontario mainlines at Port Hope. Unfortunately, the PHL&B was already leased by the GTR, who proved uninterested in sharing when a deal was attempted in 1902.

Midland remained a suitable location for a new port, between Collingwood and Parry Sound. The MR's lines in the area would require careful routing and bridging to avoid a level crossing, but it was possible. The only line that could not be avoided was the north-south N&PJ, but the CPR had already secured crossing rights for another of their lines.

=== GB&S ===
When the GTR gained control of the OA&PS in 1905 and tightened their grip on the lake trade, CPR decided to move ahead with a port in the Midland area. That year they took out a charter on the Georgian Bay and Seaboard Railway to build a line from Midland to Peterborough, a busy rail hub at that time. As was the custom of the time, railway companies were chartered to build specific routes, so a series of small companies like this were formed and then later absorbed into the operating companies.

However, the route to Peterborough was also blocked by the GTR, who owned lines on every practical approach to the city. In particular, avoiding the Toronto and Ottawa Railway would require moving far to the north or south. The CPR was again forced to re-route, this time selecting a location between Pontypool and Peterborough.

The company began construction of a major port facility across from Victoria Harbour, just outside Midland. Construction on the line started by the Toronto Construction Company in April 1907, and the first section of the railway opened on 29 June 1908. (Note: The Southern Ontario Railway map places the opening date one year later, in 1909.) The GB&S initially ran only a short distance east to meet the CPR's Muskoka mainlines in a huge wye junction lying just east of Coldwater. Traffic from the port therefore had to travel through the Toronto area. In 1912, the port was renamed Port McNicoll after CPR's vice president, David McNicoll.

A second section of the line was constructed running from the Coldwater wye to the town of Orillia at the northern tip of Lake Simcoe, opening in December 1911. This formed a massive triangle junction lying between Coldwater and Medonte. At Orillia it crossed the narrows at Lake Couchiching and then continued towards Lindsay. The lines crossed the Victoria Railway just north of town, then crossed the Scugog River and joined the existing line of the CP-leased Lindsay, Bobcaygeon and Pontypool Railway (LB&P) to travel through the town. The line wyed off the LB&P just south of Lindsay and ran the remaining distance to the O&Q lines.

The line was forced to stay west of the Midland Railway lines as they curved south towards Port Hope. The two lines almost met near the town of Bethany, one of the few passes through the Oak Ridges Moraine in the area. The GB&S finally met the O&Q just south of Bethany at a location originally known as Bethany Junction, but later renamed Dranoel as an homage to James W. Leonard, McNicoll's assistant (Dranoel is Leonard reversed). This final section of the line opened in May 1912.

The route was designed to handle heavily laden trains, and was built using 85 pound rails and routed to minimize the grade to a mere 0.4%. Several sections of the line were over-designed in order to allow future expansion. As was typical for smaller charters, on 1 January 1910 the entire line was leased to the CPR for 999 years. The fall harvest of 1910 was the first to be handled through the new port. The GB&S was heavily used during World War I and at its peak was able to handle 60 million bushels of wheat a year.

With the opening of the port and its direct access to Toronto on the CP mainlines, the CP Upper Lakes fleet re-homed in 1912. The CP fleet served both passenger and pack freight, as well as wheat with the opening of the port. The five ships could carry 300,000 tons of wheat a season (10 million bushels), in addition to other freight and passengers.

=== Expansion plans ===
CPR had big plans for the line, hoping to turn it into one of the major railways for all of Canada. However, the O&Q had not been designed to the same standards as the GB&S and was a major limit to the practicality of the line.

Initially CPR planned on upgrading the section of the O&Q between Dranoel and Glen Tay to heavier duty rail and re-routing it to have the same 0.4% grade as the GB&S. This would require line relocations in the areas east of Havelock around Madoc, and Actinolite to Kaladar. This would also have the effect of shortening the route. Consideration was also given to double-tracking the line.

Another solution was to continue the GB&S southward from Dranoel to Cobourg, where a new line would be run that would replace the O&Q for much of its length. The new line would run along the Lake Ontario shoreline through Belleville, Kingston and Brockville, then turn north to rejoin the O&Q at Bedell (Kemptville Junction). This would actually be a longer route, by the distance from Dranoel to the lake and back, but this line would serve double duty for all traffic in the area.

Neither of these plans were carried out in full. The CPR did lay the lakeside line from its CPR Agincourt Marshalling Yards to Glen Tay, but this line was never connected to the GB&S.

=== Reorganization ===
Through the 1930s a number of new routes opened that lowered the value of the GB&S (and OA&PS). A widened Welland Canal opened in 1932, which allowed lakers to travel into Lake Ontario, where they could use any number of ports along the GTR or US mainlines. Further, the construction through the 1930s of the Port of Churchill and the associated CNR line offered a dramatically shorter route to Europe, although it was only open a few months a year. Finally, new lines across northern Ontario allowed direct rail shipment from west to east, lowering the value of the lakers as a method of crossing this gap.

Further, the Great Depression had an enormous effect on the price of wheat, the line's primary cargo. In 1928 wheat sold for $1.03 a bushel; this dropped to 47 cents in 1930, and 29 cents in 1932. This was the lowest price for grain in 400 years. 250,000 people left the prairies between 1931 and 1941, with 14,000 farms abandoned in 1936 alone. 1937 year was the worst year ever in the prairie economy.

Accordingly, on 7 September 1937 the CPR made the fateful decision to close the section between Lindsay and Orillia. Traffic from the port was now sent south on the Muskoka line, and the section east to Orillia became a branch line. These sections became the Port McNicoll Subdivision. The section between Lindsay and Dranoel remained open, but only by taking over duties formerly carried out by a similar section of the Lindsay, Bobcaygeon and Pontypool Railway, which ran just to the west of the GB&S and was closed as part of the same reorganization. The remaining sections from Bobcaygeon to Lindsay and on to Dranoel became the Bobcaygeon Subdivision.

As a result of previous labour deals, this split resulted in a strange organization to service the lines. The GB&S was originally considered part of CPR's Trenton Division, which handled most of the lines east of Toronto. Lines to the west were normally part of the Bruce Division. With the split, the McNicoll Sub naturally fell under the Bruce area of control, but the Trenton workers retained the right to work that section. An arrangement was worked out where the "North Pool" of workers, on the Bruce, would service the line and keep track of all the hours spent on it. Once a year a crew from the "East Pool" would do work for that amount of time on any of the Bruce lines.

The closure ultimately proved short-sighted; the line was unable to aid the massive grain shipments during World War II, which amounted to 200 pounds of food a year for every man, woman and child in the UK. The port remained busy, but all of the traffic had to be switched through the CPR Lambton Yard in Toronto. This caused serious delays as the yard became heavily congested.

=== Abandonment ===
The Lindsay to Bobcaygeon section of the original LB&P, now part of the Bobcaygeon Sub, was abandoned on 15 June 1961. The remaining section of the Sub from Lindsay to the O&Q was abandoned on 25 December 1987.

The Port McNicoll to Coldwater section of the McNicoll Sub was abandoned on 5 March 1971. This section was expensive to run due to the maintenance load of Hogg's Bay Trestle. Instead, the port was served by the CNR lines, which were made available now that the GTR/CPR rivalry was long dead. The Trestle was removed in 1978, but CPR maintained several short sections of line in the port area.

The section from Orillia to Uhthoff was abandoned 6 December 1985. There were some plans to run a diesel tourist train on this section, the Orillia Rail Ride, but this never occurred. The section from Uhthoff to Medonte served a large gravel pit that kept that section open until 3 December 1993, and a week later the Coldwater/Medonte wye was closed, leaving only the Toronto-Sudbury mainline through this area. The crossing between the mainline and CN's Coldwater Spur, the former Midland Railway lines, was converted from manual to electrical operation.

Changes to the Crow Rate plan through the introduction of the Western Grain Transportation Act had the effect of greatly reducing the incentives to ship east, and the grain trade quickly moved to western ports. The last train ran out of Port McNicoll on 13 September 1991, and CPR's rights to use the CN lines were cancelled in November 1991. The short sections of remaining CP line in the area were abandoned after a 4 May 1992 decision of the National Transportation Agency, which declared them spurs and a yard, as opposed to a branch line.

Similar services at Midland (CN's Tiffin Grain Elevator), Owen Sound and Goderich also closed around this time. This led to the abandonment of a number of historical railways in the southern Ontario area.

=== Current fate ===
Portions of the line that were abandoned early have generally disappeared, returning to farm use or being developed over by growing towns. This includes the section between Orillia and Lindsay, and the original LB&P section between Lindsay and the O&Q. The later abandonment of the remainder of the line has seen these sections to converted to rail trail use.

The section from Dranoel to Lindsay now forms the southern branch of the Victoria Rail Trail, while the Victoria Railway forms the rest of the trail north of Lindsay. The section from Orillia to Medonte is now the Uhthoff Trail, following the wye to Coldwater where it ends at a building downtown. The section within Orillia itself is paved, and known as the Lightfoot Trail.

The final section between Coldwater and Port McNicoll is largely abandoned. The Tay Shore Trail, starting only a few hundred meters west from the end of the Uhthoff Trail in Coldwater, uses the CN routing for most of its length, although sections of the CP lines around the port are also included. This becomes the Midland Rotary Waterfront Trail in Midland, also using the CN lines. The final short section of CP line at the end of the CN lines now lies under a Marina on the west side of Midland.

== Services ==
The GB&S offered passenger and freight services. A daily except Sunday passenger service from Havelock to Port McNicoll ran until December 1932. After the closure of the Orillia-Lindsay section, a combined freight and passenger service between Port McNicoll and Orillia was offered on an unofficial basis, and not printed in any schedules. The station in Orillia had closed earlier, and later sold to the Royal Canadian Legion.

== Route ==
Unless otherwise noted, the following is taken from the Southern Ontario Railway Map

The GB&S started in Port McNicoll on the western side of Hogg's Bay outside Midland. CP built up extensive operations in the port area, including a 3,000 foot (910 m) wharf, lines running along both the shore and wharf, a 2,000,000 bushel grain elevator, and 800 by 90 foot (244 by 27 m) flour shed. A large rail operating area was built to the south of the wharf, including a six shed roundhouse served by a 70 foot (21 m) turntable. The table was later replaced by a 90 foot (27 m) model in April 1930. The elevator was upgraded several times, 4,000,000 bushels in 1911 and eventually reaching 6,500,000 bushels during 1922–23, still well short of the original plan for 12,000,000 bushels.

The lines ran south from the wharf and crossed the southern end of the bay on a 2,142 foot (653 m) wooden trestle bridge that climbed 114 feet (35 m) from pilings to running surface. The bridge avoided marshy areas at the south end of the Bay, as well as providing an above-grade crossing over the GTR-operated Midland Railway of Canada, which ran down the eastern side of the Bay. This meant they did not have to secure crossing rights. From there the GB&S generally followed the same route as the GTR lines, but stayed south and west of the PHL&B, avoiding any crossings.

At Coldwater/Medonte the line wyed into the Toronto-Sudbury mainline, which opened in 1908. The wye was designed so the GB&S could cross the PHL&B at an already arranged crossing at Medonte. From Medonte the line ran east to the pits at Uhthoff, causing the creation of the village of New Uhthoff. The line then turned south-west into Orillia, running into town on the eastern side of the PHL&B tracks. The CPR built a new bridge at Atherley to cross to the eastern side of Lake Couchiching.

From Orillia to Lindsay the line first paralleled the PHL&B, but then moved away from it near Lagoon City and followed a more direct south-west route towards Lindsay. One of the few spurs on the line leads south from the point about halfway between the two cities. The line crossed the Scugog River north of Lindsay and ran into town along the eastern shoreline, sharing the tracks of the LB&P into town.

The final portion of the line starts at the Lindsay station and follows the river southward out of town. Just outside the GB&S and LB&P split again at Lindsay Junction. The GB&S then runs roughly south-southwest to Betheney where it meets the PHL&B again, and ends at a wye junction with the O&Q at Dranoel.

The main stations on the line were at Port McNicoll, Coldwater, Orillia, Brechin, Lindsay and Dranoel. Five stations have been preserved, Orillia's station on Mississaga Street East on the lake front, Brechin at Highway 12 and Concession 3, Eldon on Highway 46 (some distance from the town of Eldon), Balsam Lake was moved to Lorneville and is now a general store, and Grass Hill was moved to a farm three miles east of Oakwood.
