= Lindsay, Bobcaygeon and Pontypool Railway =

Railway in Ontario, Canada

Lindsay, Bobcaygeon & Pontypool Railway
Overview
- Reporting mark: LB&P
- Locale: Ontario, Canada
- Dates of operation: 1904–1961

Technical
- Track gauge: 4 ft 8 1/2 in (1,435 mm) standard gauge

The Lindsay, Bobcaygeon & Pontypool Railway (LB&P) was a short-line railway in Ontario, Canada. It was originally designed to serve sawmills in Bobcaygeon, running southward to the Ontario and Quebec Railway at Burketon, near Pontypool. Passenger service for weekender trips to the beaches on Sturgeon Lake was a major service later in the line's life.

The line was one of the last major independent lines to be built in Ontario, starting construction in 1901 and completing in 1904. It operated only for a short time before being leased to the Canadian Pacific Railway for a period of 99 years. Plans to continue construction northward to connect to the Irondale, Bancroft and Ottawa Railway never materialized. The line was abandoned in sections, south of Lindsay in 1932 and north of there in 1961.

Today a portion of the line outside Bobcaygeon is used as a local road, and a short section is a nature trail, but the majority has been returned to farmland.

== History ==
=== Formation ===
Thomas Need's saw and grist mill had been operating on Bobcaygeon Island since 1832, and to service the mills the first lock of what would become the Trent–Severn Waterway was installed in 1833. In 1846 this was joined by the first mill of the Boyd Lumber Company, who ran the Trent Valley Navigation Company to haul cargo on the Kawartha Lakes as far as Lindsay. Here they could connect with the Midland Railway of Canada for shipment south. However, the lakes and rivers froze solid in the winter, limiting their markets to the summer. Boyd pressed for a rail link to Lindsay, but failed to gain support.

In 1881 the long-delayed plans for the Ontario and Quebec Railway (O&Q) through Peterborough were picked up by Canadian Pacific Railway. This line was much closer to Lindsay, and ran directly into Toronto. A new line from Bobcaygeon to Lindsay and then to the O&Q would cut the distance to Toronto considerably. The extended Port Whitby and Port Perry Railway along the western side of the Lake Scugog was almost ideal, but had no connection with the O&Q and was notorious for poor reliability. A route along the east side of the river to Pontypool was chosen.

The Lindsay, Bobcaygeon & Pontypool Railway was incorporated in March 1890 by businessmen in the Bobcaygeon and Kawartha area, notably William (Willie) Thornton Cust Boyd and Sam Hughes. However, efforts to gain funding from various levels of government failed, and the charter remained dormant.

=== Construction ===
Renewed interest by those willing to provide financial support took place near the end of the decade. Surveys of the route began in June 1900, and some grading took place that year and the next. However very little progress had been by 1903, when the CPR agreed to lease the line.

Track laying began in May 1904 and reached Lindsay in June. Here a dispute with the Grand Trunk over rights-of-way broke out and construction stalled until this was addressed. The solution was to run the LP&B under the GTR lines as they crossed the Scugog River. Construction on the connection to the O&Q quickly revealed that the area around Pontypool would be too difficult, so the connection was moved west to Burketon. Construction continued and the first train reached Bobcaygeon on 28 July 1904. Minor additional construction continued until August.

Initial plans called for a connection to the Irondale, Bancroft and Ottawa Railway somewhere between Kinmount and Irondale, an extension of about 20 miles to the existing 38.7 miles of track. However, no work in the extension was ever carried out. By this time the rush to service Haliburton and Hastings meant the area was well served by other railways.

=== Abandonment ===
The southern section of the LB&P between Lindsay and the O&Q was made redundant with the completion of the Georgian Bay and Seaboard Railway (GB&S) in 1912. The GB&S had considered using the LB&P line out of Lindsay when their original plans to connect to Peterborough were scuttled. In keeping with the original goal of providing a shortcut to the east, backtracking along the LB&P did not make sense, and a new connection to the O&Q was made near Bethany, originally known as Bethany Station, but later renamed Dranoel. The LB&P and GB&S shared the line through Lindsay and the downtown station.

With both the lines operated by CPR and connecting to the O&Q only miles apart, it was not long before one of the lines would be closed. This fell to the LB&P, whose last passenger train operated along this route on 10 December 1932. The opening of the Fourth (current) Welland Canal reduced the need for a rail link from Georgian Bay to Montreal, and the CPR closed the section of the GB&S between Lindsay and Orillia in September 1937. They reorganized the remaining Bobcaygeon-Lindsay-Bethany route as the Bobcaygeon Subdivision.

The upper section of the LB&P between Lindsay and Bobcaygeon was abandoned on 15 June 1961, and some of the route was later re-used for a local road. The final section of the Bobcaygeon Sub, the original GB&S south of Lindsay, was abandoned on 25 November 1987. The small section within Lindsay, shared by the LB&P and GB&S, was used briefly until 1990.

=== Current use ===
The section leading out of Bobcaygeon, including the two bridges over the Bobcaygeon River and Emily Creek, was purchased by the Village of Bobcaygeon on 27 February 1963. This was used to provide access to Sturgeon Lake, and forms today's Kawartha Lakes Road 24. The bridge in Bobcaygeon was widened to two lanes in 1973.

Road 24 ends at Ontario Highway 36 just north of the town of Dunsford, with a short section south of 36 used as Dunsford's Community Centre Road. Between Dunsford and Heights Road, a distance of 7 km, is the only portion of the line being used as a trail, the Dunsford Nature Trail.

The LB&P closed before rail trails became popular, and most of the route has been abandoned. A few other portions of the route are used as access roads or private driveways, but the majority now lies on active farmland. The only surviving station is the "Swiss Cottage" style Dunsford Station, now used as a cottage.

== Services ==
Passenger service was offered with two daily round-trip trains between Bobcaygeon and Burketon Station, with a third mixed service train between Lindsay and Burketon. A Peterboro Lake Simcoe Navigation Co. steamer left Bobcaygeon for Stony Lake straight after the noon train arrived. The Bobcaygeon Special was a special weekend service that left Toronto Union Station at 1 pm on Saturday and returned via the CPR's North Toronto railway station on Sunday evening. This allowed downtown workers to leave for the country after working half a day on Saturday, and then return at a point closer to their homes the next day.

After the construction of the GB&S, additional service was also offered from Peterborough to Lindsay and then on to Bobcaygeon, but then returning along Burketon to North Toronto. After the closure of the southern section of the LB&P, services ran from Peterborough to Lindsay and Bobcaygeon, with connections both ways to and from Toronto at Dranoel.

Passengers services along the entire route ended on 26 October 1957. The Bobcaygeon station was demolished in 1961. Lindsay station was briefly used as a museum, but was itself demolished in 1964.

== Route ==
The LB&P ran almost due north from Burketon Station to a point near Williams Point where it turned north-northeast to round Lake Scugog. It turned north again outside O'Donnell Landing for the short remaining run into Lindsay. It entered the town on the east side of Scugog River, following it as it bent to the west, where it was joined by the Midland's line from Port Hope. The LB&P built a new station on Caroline Street near the corner of Queen St. to provide passenger service.

After running north past the station in Lindsay, the line turned east to leave the town, then northeast towards Bobcaygeon. This area of land is relatively flat, and the line is almost perfectly straight. At Emily Creek, just south of Sturgeon Lake, the line turned northward to run along the southern shore of the lake. A large trestle bridge carried the line across the mouth of the Creek. The line then runs roughly west-northwest for the short remaining distance to Bobcaygeon, crossing the Bobcaygeon River near Minns Avenue, and then ending at William's Street. The swing bridge at Bobcaygeon limited weights to smaller locomotives, including D-4 class 4-6-0.

Stations on the southern portion of the line were Burketon, Nestleton Station (south of the town of Nestleton) and Janetville near modern View Lake. The LB&P and GB&S met at Lindsay Junction, just south of town, and shared rails north from that point to the Lindsay station, one of CPR's rare "witch's hat" style stations with a round waiting room topped with a conical roof. From Lindsay to Bobcaygeon stations were Dunsford, Ancona and Kenstone and then Bobcaygeon at the corner of Mansfield and Park Streets.
