= SS Keewatin =

Passenger liner

Coordinates: 44.22513°N 76.48325°W

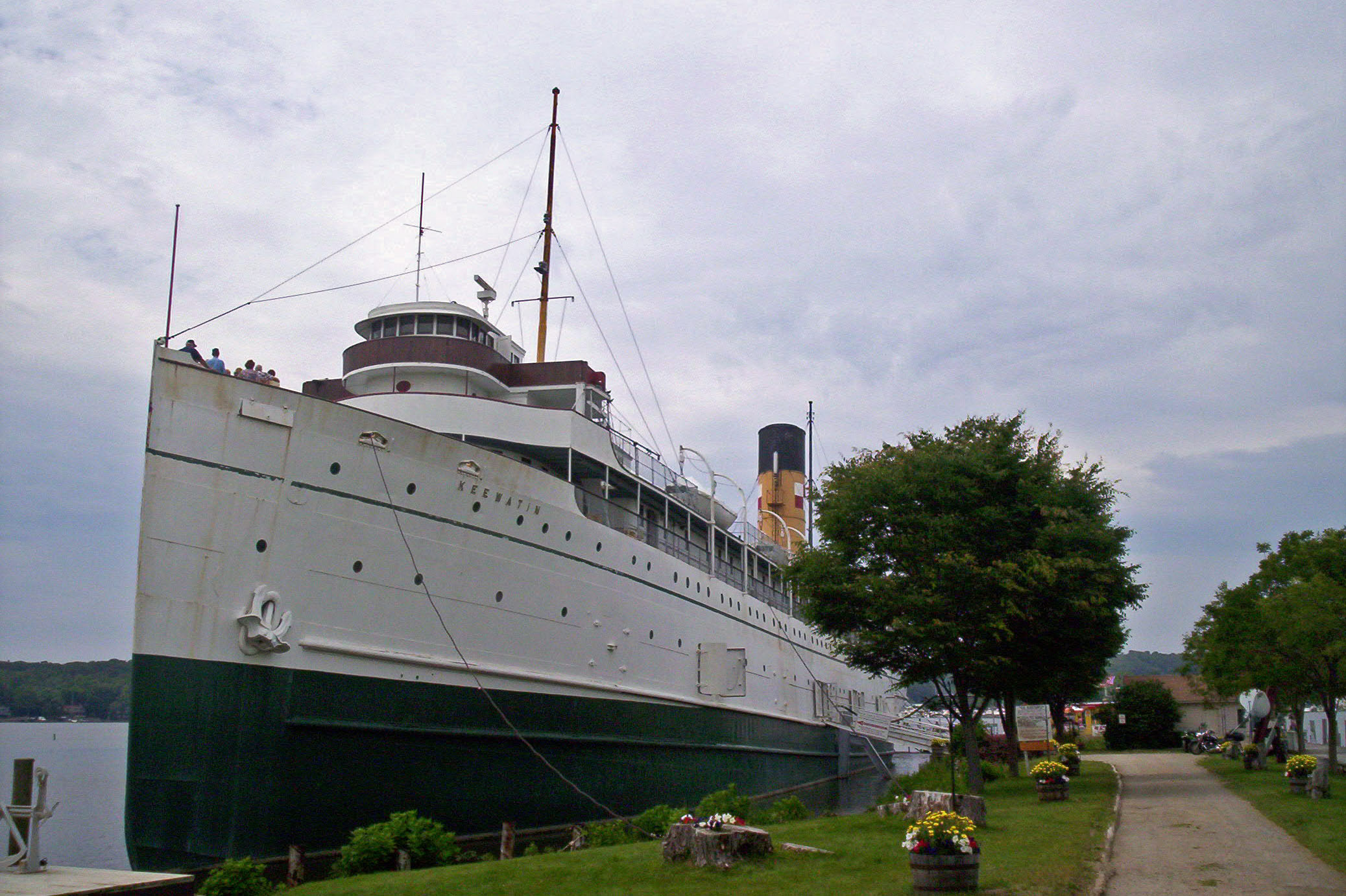
- Keewatin alongside in Douglas

History
- Name: Keewatin
- Owner: Canadian Pacific Steamship Company
- Port of registry: (Canada) Montreal
- Builder: Fairfield Shipbuilding and Engineering Company, Govan, Scotland
- Launched: 6 July 1907
- Christened: 1907
- Maiden voyage: 14 September 1907
- In service: 7 October 1908
- Out of service: 29 November 1965
- Status: Museum ship

General characteristics
- Type: Passenger liner
- Tonnage: 3,856 GRT
- Length: 102.6 m (336 ft 7 in) pp
- Beam: 13.3 m (43 ft 8 in)
- Draught: 7.2 m (23 ft 7 in)
- Installed power: 3,000 hp (2,200 kW) nominal
- Propulsion: Quadruple expansion steam engine, 4 coal-fired scotch boilers, Single screw propeller
- Speed: 16 knots (30 km/h; 18 mph) max
- Capacity: 288
- Crew: 86

SS Keewatin is a passenger liner which once travelled between Port Arthur/Fort William (now Thunder Bay) on Lake Superior and Port McNicoll on Georgian Bay (Lake Huron) in Ontario, Canada. She carried passengers between these ports for the Canadian Pacific Railway's Great Lakes steamship service. Keewatin also carried packaged freight goods for the railway at these ports.

Keewatin is the largest of the remaining Edwardian era passenger steamers remaining in the world, along with Nomadic, and the lake steamer TSS Earnslaw (1913), currently still operational in New Zealand.

== Description ==
Keewatin is a passenger liner that when built, measured 3,856 gross register tons (GRT) and 2,470 NRT. The ship has a length between perpendiculars of 102.6 metres (336 ft 7 in) and a beam of 13.3 metres (43 ft 8 in) with a draught of 7.2 metres (23 ft 7 in). The vessel was powered by four coal-fired scotch boilers, each 4.3 metres (14 ft 1 in) by 3.4 metres (11 ft), providing steam to a quadruple expansion steam engine turning one screw creating 3,000 horsepower (2,200 kW) nominal. This gave the ship a maximum speed of 16 knots (30 km/h; 18 mph) and a cruising speed of 14 knots (26 km/h; 16 mph).

The ship had 108 staterooms with berths for 288 passengers. The vessel was crewed by 86 officers and staff.

== Construction and career ==
Built by Fairfield Shipbuilding and Engineering Company in Govan, Glasgow, Scotland as yard number 453, Keewatin was launched on 6 July 1907 and completed in September. The vessel sailed on her maiden voyage docking in the Davie shipyard at Lévis, Quebec on 5 October to be halved because the canals below Lake Erie, specifically the Welland Canal could not handle ships as long as Keewatin. The ship was reassembled at Buffalo, New York, where she resumed her delivery voyage under her own power on 19 December 1907. She began service from Owen Sound, Ontario on 7 October 1908.

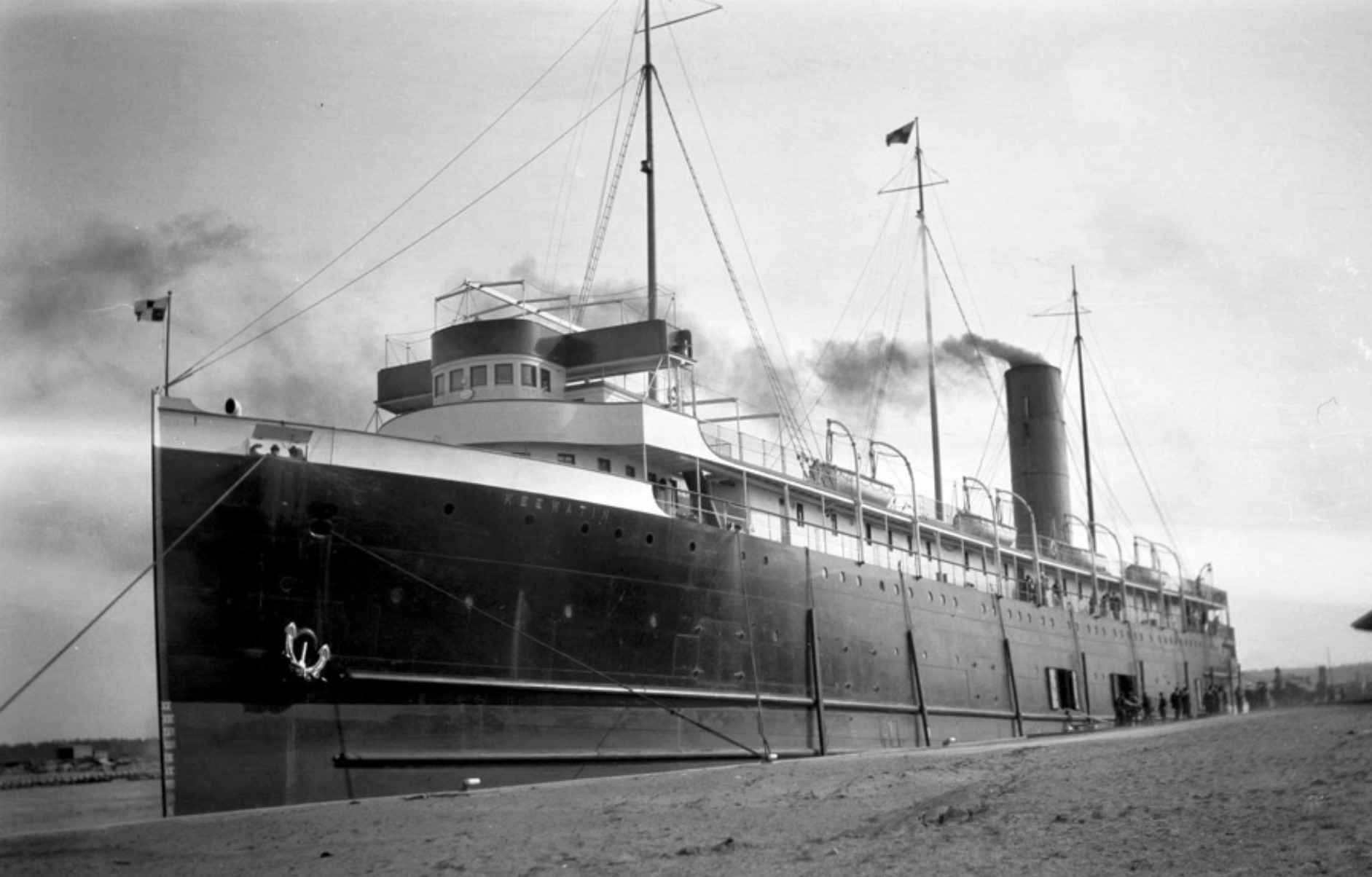
Keewatin in the 1910s

=== Route ===
Keewatin was originally designed to supplement the Great Lakes link in the Canadian Pacific Railway's continental route. Together with her sister ship Assiniboia, she joined three others, Manitoba, Athabaska, and Alberta (the latter two also built in Scotland). She served this purpose by linking the Railroad's Owen Sound depot to Fort William Port Arthur on Lake Superior. In 1912 Port McNicoll, Ontario, was established as the new 'super port' and rail terminus and the ships moved there. The ships took two and a half days to make the trip each way, including half a day traversing the Soo Locks. Port McNicoll was known as the "Chicago of the North" until the trains and ships were discontinued in 1965 following the completion of the Trans Canada Highway through northern Ontario, causing the town to stagnate and diminish, as all of the rail and ship jobs left.

In the last fifteen years of her working life, like many passenger ships of that era on the Great Lakes, Keewatin and Assiniboia operated under stringent regulations imposed for wooden cabin steamships following the Noronic disaster in 1949. In December 1950, a sprinker system and fire bulkheads were installed, and the three wooden masts were replaced by two of steel. Doomed by their wooden cabins and superstructures, these overnight cruisers lasted through the decline of the passenger trade on the Great Lakes in the post-war years, as travellers opted for more reliable and faster modes of travel. To continue in service beyond the 1965 season, rebuilding of the ships' wooden superstructures was required, so they were withdrawn from the passenger trade. Keewatin's final passenger service ended on 29 November 1965. The following year they operated a freight–only service, and on 8 November 1966 Keewatin was sold to Marine Salvage Ltd of Port Colborne for demolition. Assiniboia retired in November 1967 and was sold for conversion to a restaurant in 1968, but gutted by fire at Philadelphia on 9 November 1969.

Along with South American and Milwaukee Clipper, Keewatin and Assiniboia were among the last of the turn-of-the-century style overnight passenger ships of the Great Lakes.

== Museum ship ==
After languishing for a few years, in January 1967 Keewatin was bought by West Michigan entrepreneur Roland J. Peterson Sr. for $37,000, $2,000 more than it would have sold for scrap. It arrived on the Kalamazoo River in Douglas, Michigan, on 27 June 1967. The ship was known as Keewatin Maritime Museum, permanently docked across the river from the summer retreat Saugatuck, Michigan, from 1968 until its relocation in 2012. In July 2011 Keewatin was purchased by Skyline Marine and dredged from the Kalamazoo River with a one-mile (1.6 km) long, ten-foot (3.0 m) deep, 50-foot (15 m) wide excavation and dredged channel and moved to the mouth of the river and Lake Michigan on 4 June. Keewatin, crewed with a complement of ten, was towed back to Canada and arrived in Port McNicoll on 23 June 2012.

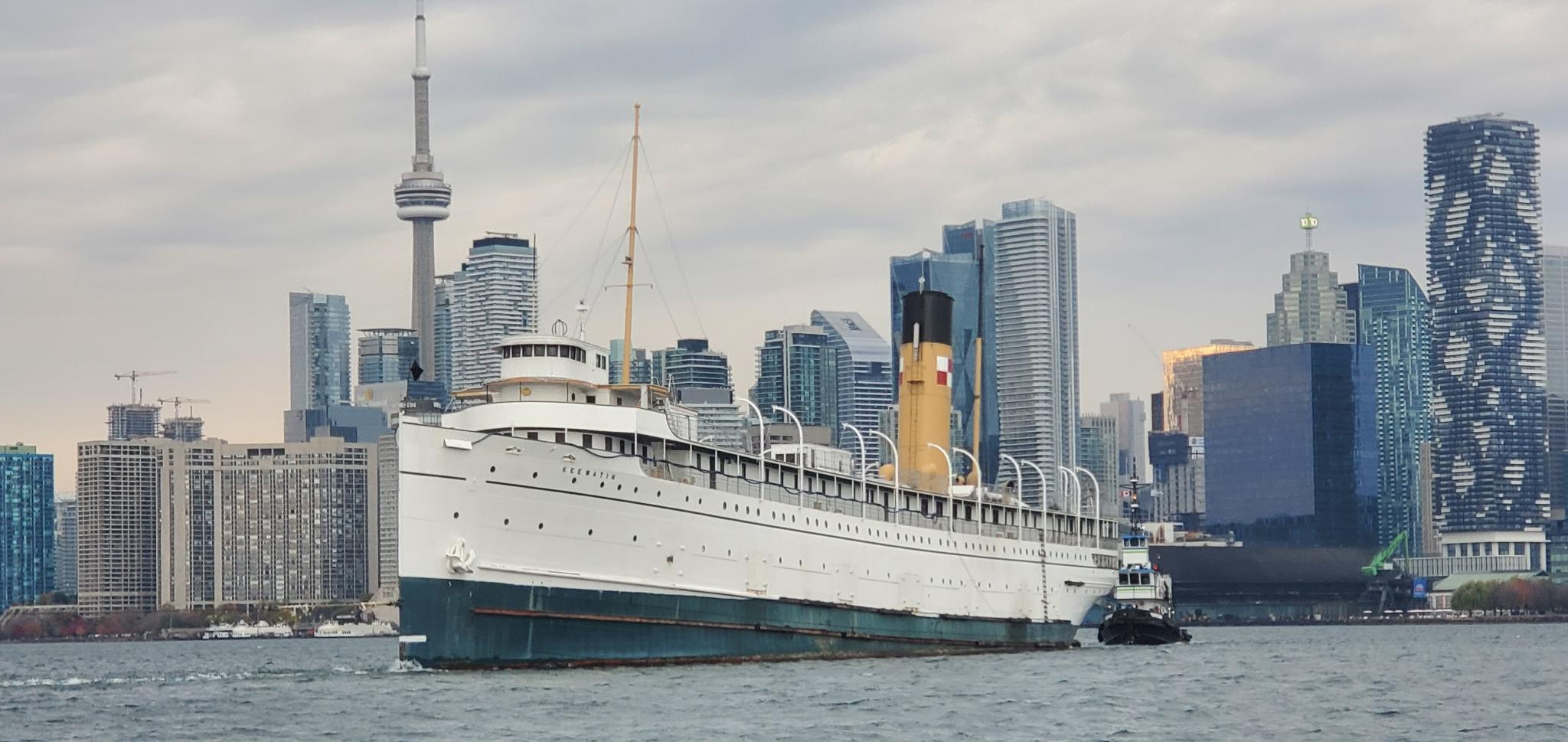
Keewatin at the Toronto waterfront, on 25 October 2023

=== Relocation ===
In August 2011 it was announced the vessel had been sold to Skyline International Developments Inc., and was moved back to Keewatin's home port of Port McNicoll, Ontario, on 23 June 2012, for restoration and permanent display as a maritime museum and event facility. This was possible due to cooperation of the local and provincial and federal officials in obtaining permissions and permits to dredge the harbour where Keewatin sat for 45 years to allow the ship to be moved. A not for profit foundation, the Diane and RJ Peterson Keewatin Foundation, was formed to operate the ship and restore her. Skyline Developments, a publicly held corporation that was rebuilding the 12,000-acre (4,900 ha) Port McNicoll site, funded the project.

Keewatin was moved from Kalamazoo Lake on 31 May 2012, and docked about one mile (1.6 km) down river just inside the pier for continued maintenance before entering Lake Michigan. The vessel departed Saugatuck for the lake on 4 June 2012, to continue its journey northward to Mackinaw City. There Keewatin had a temporary layover before the final leg of the trip to Port McNicoll.

On 23 June 2012, a celebration marked Keewatin's return and the rebirth of a new planned community surrounding her. It was 45 years after Keewatin left Port McNicoll on 23 June 1967 and 100 years after 12 May 1912, the date that the ship began working from the same dock.

In late 2017 plans were discussed to move Keewatin to Midland, Ontario. By March 2018 it became clear that Keewatin would remain in Port McNicoll for another summer pending further relocation options. In 2019, development company CIM committed to incorporating Keewatin into a redevelopment plan at the Port McNicoll site; the plans called for the ship to remain as a museum in a park adjacent to the proposed mixed-use (residential and commercial) development. But by June 2020, Skyline Investments (owner of Keewatin and surrounding development properties) indicated CIM had defaulted on mortgage payments, and would instead be pursuing plans to donate the ship to the Marine Museum of the Great Lakes in Kingston, Ontario. Local reaction to the relocation from Port McNicoll was mixed, but ultimately the Marine Museum completed their acquisition of Keewatin in March 2023.

Keewatin left Port McNicoll on 24 April 2023 after weeks of preparation for her relocation by volunteers from The RJ and Diane Peterson Keewatin Foundation. The ship arrived at Heddle Shipyards in Hamilton Harbour on 29 April 2023 for retrofitting and repairs prior to the move to Kingston. Keewatin arrived at Kingston on 26 October while under tow by tugboats. The ship was placed in a dry dock and received a heritage designation. On 17 May 2024, Keewatin was opened for public tours. The Museum has recently started hosting themed and special events on the ship, such as a Hallowe'en event for children.

== Film and television ==
The ship has become a set for a number of maritime-related documentaries and television docudramas, including subjects involving the torpedoed ocean liner Lusitania, the burned-out Bahamas cruise ship Yarmouth Castle, Canadian Pacific's Empress of Ireland, as well as Titanic. She was also used extensively in the opening episode of Season Seven of Murdoch Mysteries, "Murdoch Ahoy". A documentary on the efforts to save Keewatin called "Bring Her on Home: The Return of S.S. Keewatin" was broadcast on CBC Canada.
