= Port McNicoll, Ontario =

Community in Ontario, Canada

Port McNicoll
- Unincorporated community
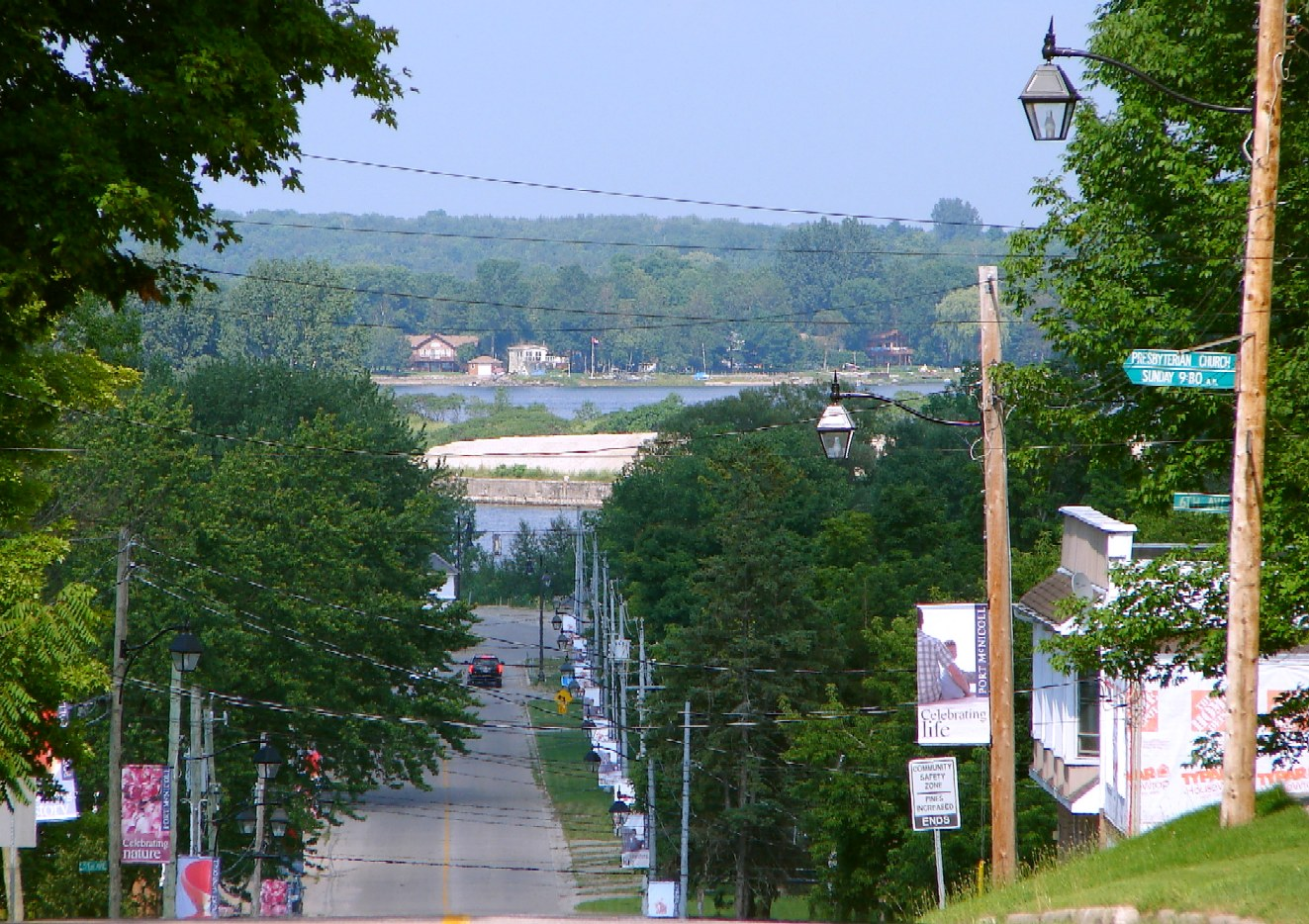

- Location in Ontario
- Coordinates: 44.74625°N 79.80761°W
- Country: Canada
- Province: Ontario
- Township: Tay
- Established: 1908

Port McNicoll is a community in the Canadian province of Ontario. It is located in the Simcoe County township of Tay.

== Busy terminal ==
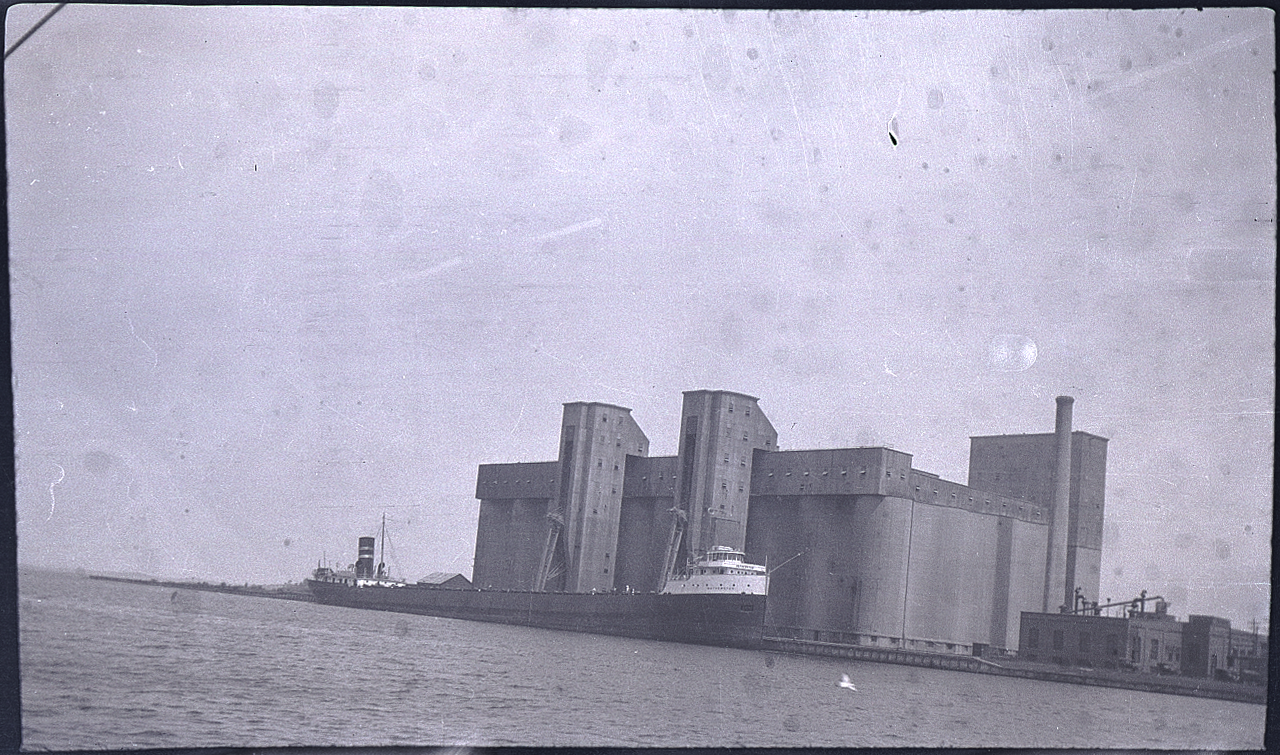
Great Lakes bulk carrier at the grain elevators at Port McNicoll, 1923

The community of Port McNicoll was established in 1908 as a Great Lakes port on the southern shores of Georgian Bay. It was the home port of the Canadian Pacific Railway's Great Lakes Service from 1908, when the eastern terminus of the marine operations were relocated from Owen Sound. It was named for railway executive David McNicoll (1852–1916). Port McNicoll was also the western terminus of the CPR's Georgian Bay and Seaboard Railway, connecting to its Ontario and Quebec Railway, near Bethany.

Warehouses were constructed on the western side of the port for handling package freight, as well as the station for passengers, the roundhouse and railyards for servicing the trains, the community was west of the harbour. On a peninsula to the east, the railway constructed a large grain elevator for storage of grain brought in by bulk freighter, from the Canadian Lakehead. At Port McNicoll, the grain was loaded into box cars for shipment to the Port of Montreal, via Orillia and Lindsay.

== Boat train ==
From 1912, Port McNicoll was home port of the CPR's passenger and package freight steamships, SS Keewatin and flagship SS Assiniboia. The steamers would take on passengers from the "boat train", arriving from Toronto, upbound to Port Arthur / Fort William to connect with their trains there. Downbound, the steamers would carry passengers back to Port McNicoll, returning to Toronto via Medonte and Midhurst.

During the depression of the 1930s, the rail connection between Orillia and Lindsay was abandoned. The CPR's older steamers, SS Alberta, SS Athabaska and SS Manitoba continued to run from Owen Sound until the mid-1930s when the Alberta and Athabaska were withdrawn from service. With an increase in the handling of package freight, these two ships were pressed into freight-only service from Port McNicoll, until the end of the war. The SS Manitoba was retired in 1950, following the SS Noronic disaster.

The SS Keewatin and SS Assiniboia continued operating until the cessation of passenger service in 1965, when they, too, were reduced to freight-only service. The coal burning Keewatin was withdrawn from service in November 1966, while sister ship Assiniboia, with boilers converted to burn oil years earlier, lasted longer. The SS Assiniboia retired on November 26, 1967.

Built by Fairfield Shipbuilding and Engineering Company in Scotland as Hull No. 453, the Keewatin was launched on 6 July 1907 and entered service in the following year. She ran continuously for almost 60 seasons and was retired from service in 1966. Soon after, she was acquired by RJ Peterson of Douglas, Michigan, for historic preservation. Her sister ship, the Assiniboia, was also set to be preserved as an attraction, but burned in Camden, New Jersey, in 1971 and was scrapped.

On June 23, 2012, the SS Keewatin, the last of the CPR Ships built in 1907, was returned to Port McNicoll, where it had worked from 1912 until 1967. Keewatin is the last Edwardian steamship left in the world. The SS Keewatin was sold and moved in 2022 to Kingston. It is now at home in the Great Lakes Museum. Tours can be purchased at the museum or online.

== Town life ==
Port McNicoll had one public elementary school, which taught children from Jr. Kindergarten to Grade 8, after which students head to either Midland Secondary School or St. Theresa's High School, both located in Midland, Ontario. As of June, 2015, Port McNicoll Public School closed due to not being able to find funding. Students wishing to go to school will be bussed to neighbouring Victoria Harbour, where there are both a Catholic and a public school.

Over the last 20 years, businesses in Port McNicoll have been on the decline. At one point, there was a hotel/pub (which burnt to the ground in the 1980s), two supermarkets, a charity shop, a movie store, a fish and chip shop, as well as an LCBO. There are currently two convenience stores, two restaurants, a mechanic shop with a gas pump, a legion branch, a surplus store, a post office, a barbershop, and a library.

Most people living in Port McNicoll work in various industries in the Midland/Penetanguishene area. The population increases somewhat, due to cottagers, during the summer months. Most cottages are located near the many beaches on the shores of Georgian Bay.

One of the events in Port McNicoll is the annual Portarama festival held on Victoria Day weekend. There are fireworks, a parade and various other family oriented activities.

== Investment interest ==
There is a $1 billion redevelopment project underway in Port McNicoll. Skyline International Development Inc. is building a community for residents. Port McNicoll may see more than 1,500,000 square feet (140,000 m^{2}) of commercial space added to the region.
