= Russian ship of the line Poltava (1712) =

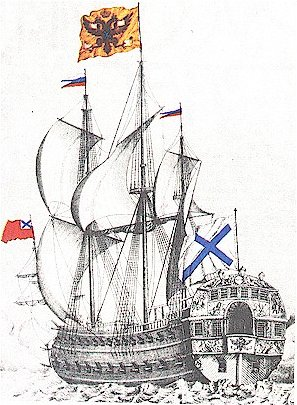

History

Russian Empire
- Name: Poltava
- Builder: Peter I, Fedosey Sclyaev
- Laid down: 5 December 1709
- Launched: 15 June 1712
- Decommissioned: 1732
- Fate: Decommissioned 1732

General characteristics
- Class & type: 54-gun Fourth-rate ship of the line
- Tons burthen: 1100–1200 tonnes
- Length: 39.82 m (gundeck)
- Beam: 11.69 m
- Depth of hold: 4.6 m
- Propulsion: Sails
- Sail plan: Full-rigged ship
- Complement: 300–460
- Armament: 54 guns of various weights of shot

Poltava (Russian: Полтава) was a 54-gun ship of the line of the Imperial Russian Navy that was launched on 15 June (Note: All dates are in the New Style) 1712 from Saint Petersburg. The ship was named after an important for Russia victory over the Swedish Empire in the Battle of Poltava and became the first battleship laid down and built at the St. Petersburg Admiralty. In the 1710s, the ship was sometimes visited and commanded by Peter I, who also took active part in the design and construction of the ship. During her service of 1712–1732, Poltava was part of the Baltic Fleet, and before the end of Great Northern War participated in six marine campaigns (1713–1717 and 1721). She was later used for training Kronstadt crews in the Baltic Sea. Poltava was decommissioned in 1732.

== Background ==
In 1702–1703, Russian troops captured the Swedish fortresses of Noteborg and Nyenskans on the Neva river that provided Russia an outlet to the Baltic Sea. A series of measures were taken in the spring and autumn of 1703 to protect the conquered territories, such as raising the fortresses of St. Petersburg (on Zayachy Island at the mouth of the Neva), and Kronstadt (on the island of Kotlin). Construction of ships of the newly created Baltic Fleet started only in August 1708 – January 1709 with four 50-gun ships of the line named Riga, Vyborg, Pernov and one untitled. These ships were not full-fledged battleships because they had a small draft and flat bottom that reduced their sailing capabilities.

== Construction ==
A draft of the 54-gun battleship Poltava was developed by the end of 1709 by Peter I and Fedosey Sklyaev using the latest achievements of contemporary shipbuilding. A few years before Poltava was laid down, large stocks of iron parts and high-quality, well-dried oak planks were accumulated at the St. Petersburg Admiralty. The construction was started by Peter I on 5 December 1709. While Peter dedicated much of his time to the project, he could not continuously oversee the process, and most routine work was done by Sklyaev. The launch of Poltava on 15 June 1712 was attended by the whole royal family. On the night of 24 August, Sklyaev sailed the ship out of St. Petersburg. Because of its large draft, the ship would ground when passing through the Neva; therefore, its front was lifted by specially designed boats. On 25 August Poltava reached Kronstadt where it was fitted with rigging.

== Description ==
=== Dimensions and features ===
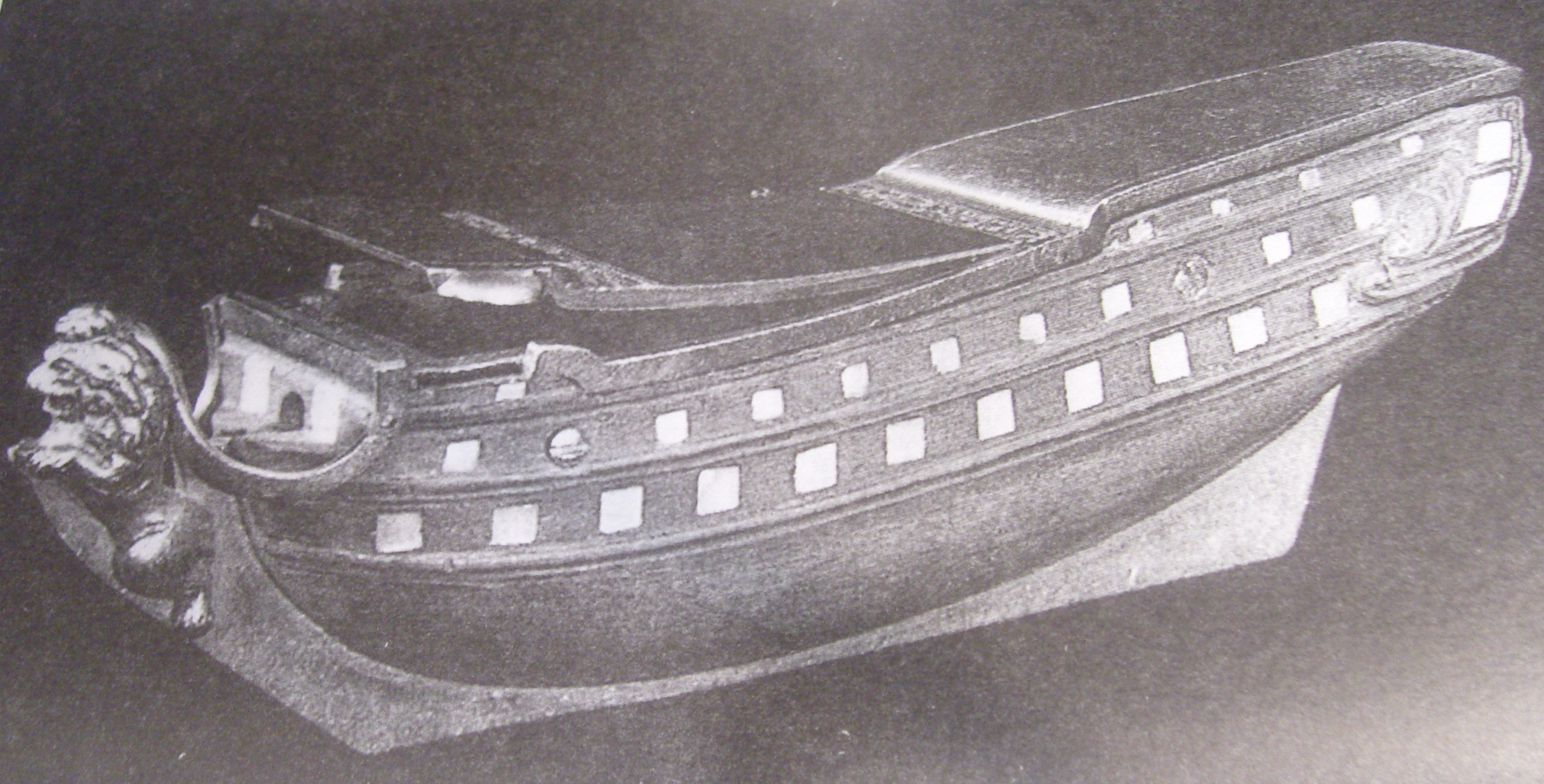
A snuffbox of 1712 supposedly made in the form of Poltava (Hermitage Museum).

By its dimensions Poltava was a fourth-rate line ship: its deck length was 130 ft 8 in (39.83 m), the width without shell was 38 ft 4 1/2 in (11.697 m) and the depth of hold was 15 ft 2 1/2 in (4.636 m). The ship looked much bigger with all its overhangs and the shell. The displacement of Poltava is not known and is estimated at 1100–1200 tonnes.

The contours of Poltava's hull were slightly sharper compared to its progenitors Riga, Vyborg and Pernov. This was criticized by the Englishman John Dan, who served from 1711 to 1722 as a naval officer in the Russian Navy. Dan believed the ship was too narrow in the stern and would not withstand open sea waves. The top part of the hull was bent inwards in order to hinder boarding from an attacking vessel. The shell plating was about 5 inches (13 cm) thick.

=== Decor ===
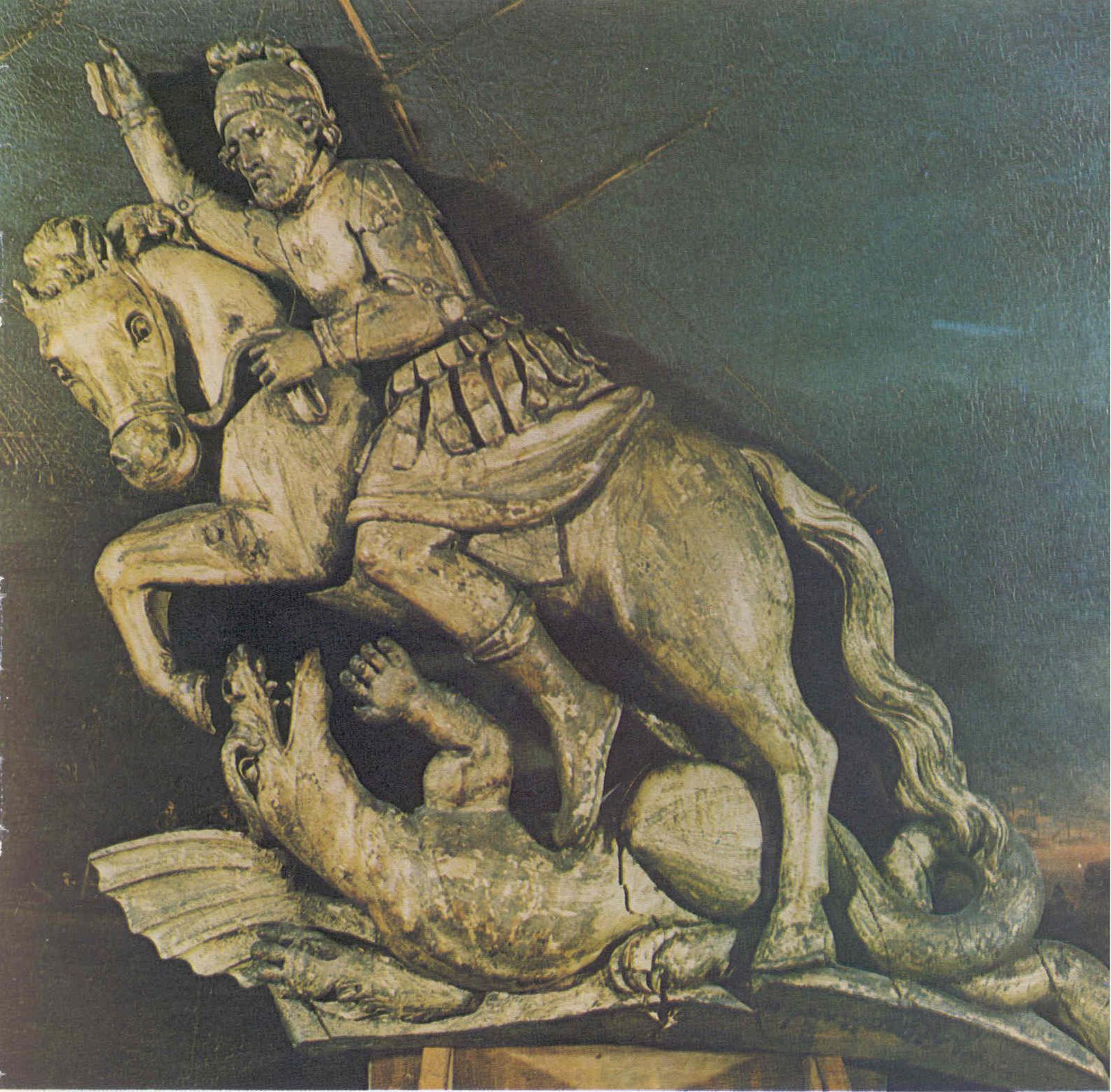
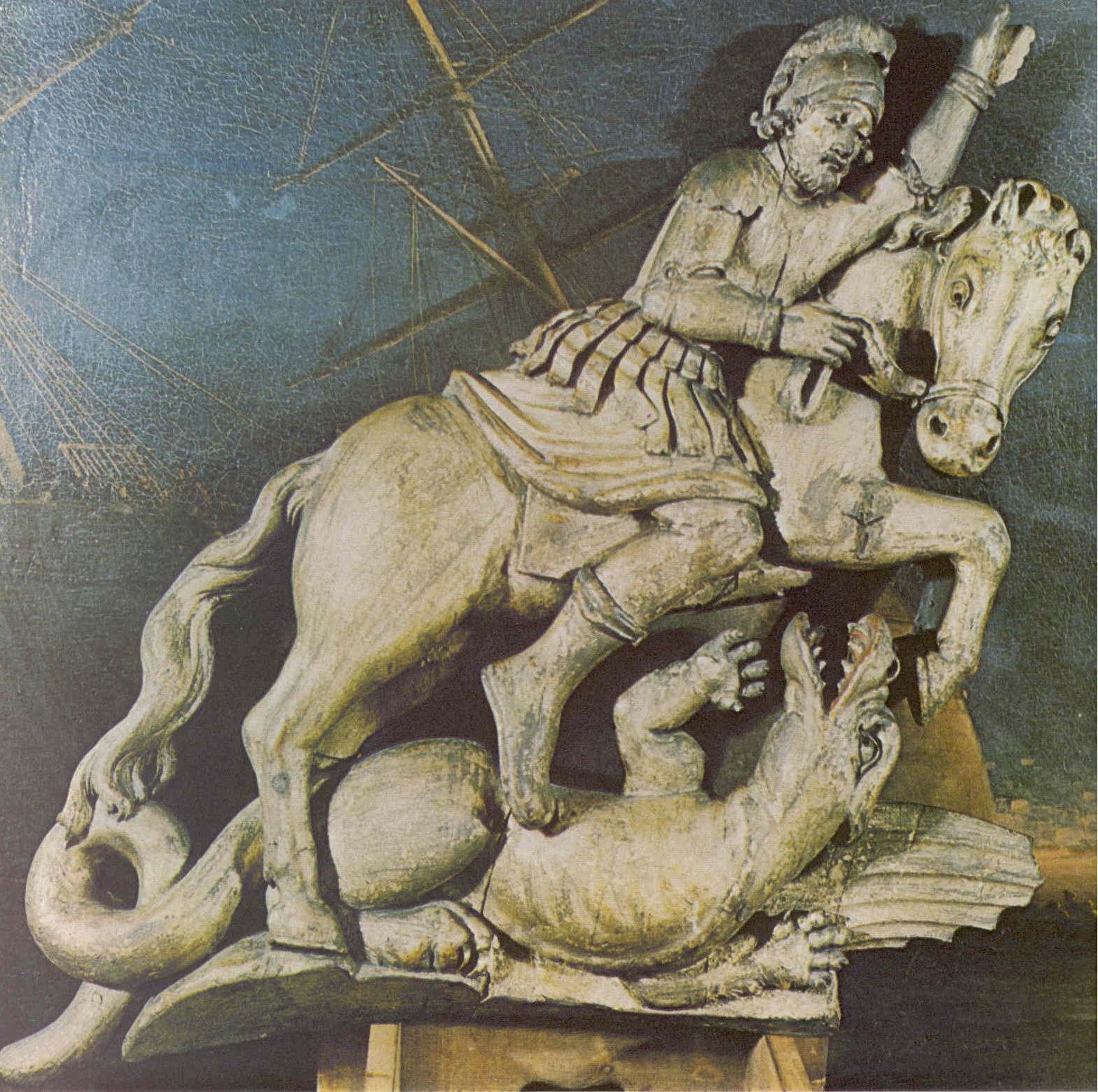
Rear decor with two mirror-symmetric sculptures of Saint George slaying the dragon, carved presumably in 1712 by Robert Geysnel.

Decor of Poltava was typical of the time. Its main theme was glorification of the Russian victory over the Swedes at the Battle of Poltava. The rear was more round than the pyramidal Dutch shapes. Another distinction of Poltava from contemporary ships was the lack of a walking gallery across the stern. Instead, it featured a protruding balcony with a half-dome roof. It also had two rows of windows with small panes, one above the balcony and one running across it. All the sculptures and decorations of the stern were repeated twice in a mirror fashion. An oval cartouche with the name of the ship was positioned in the center of the top part. The cartouche was framed by palm branches and flanked by two sitting glories blowing the trumpets. A naiad further to the ship edge was giving a laurel wreath to each glory. The balcony was flanked by two 82×75 cm figures of Saint George slaying the dragon. Further toward the edges there were two figures of falling head-first Phaëton, which meant to allegorically depict Charles XII of Sweden. The balcony featured a large double-headed eagle holding in its beaks and claws maps of the four seas to which Russia gained access during the rule of Peter I. The panels left and right to the eagle contained a traditional arrangement of flags, guns and spears, with heads of Zephyrus "sending winds of victory to the Russian flags". The figurehead most likely represented a lion holding in its claws a shield with a double-headed eagle on it.

=== Armament and crew ===
The ship was armed with 54 guns. The lower deck was fitted with twenty two 18-pounders, (Note: Gun caliber was traditionally measured by weight of the round shot expressed in artillery pounds (0.491 kg).) the upper deck with twenty 12-pounders and quarterdeck with twelve 6-pounders. The ship was also equipped with two reserve rear guns, and was not designed to have frontal guns. There is no reliable information on the anchors of Poltava. It is only known that in June 1712 it should have 4–5 anchors of about 1.5 tonne each.

Commanders of Poltava
Name	Year
Hendrick Helm	1713
Weybrandt Schelting	1714
William Fangent	1715–1717
Jacob Shapizo	1720–1721
Daniel Jacob Wilster	1722–1723

According to the Admiralty regulations of 5 April 1718, the crew of a 50-gun ship should be 350 people and contain 6 officers (captain, a naval secretary, two poruchiks and two sub-poruchiks), two midshipmen, two food commissioners, 6 quartermasters and two cooks, two navigators and two sub-navigators, a bootsmann with three deputies, a shkhiman (sail specialist) with two deputies and two apprentices, a clerk, a doctor with two assistants, a konstabel (artillery specialist) with two deputies and 30 gunners, two trumpeters, three caulkers, a locksmith, a warden (looking for prisoners and order in general) and 16 guard soldiers, three carpenters, 241 sailors and 10 junior sailors.

The crew of Poltava varied from 300 to 460 depending on whether the fleet operations were defensive or offensive, respectively. Because of shortage of sailors the ship was usually understaffed and the documented numbers are as follows: 351 (June 1714), 338 (149 sailors and 189 soldiers, 17 July 1714), 446 (July 1716) and 292 (March 1721). Jacob Shapizo, who later rose to become commander of the Russian naval base at Reval (Tallinn), was a grandson of the French author Samuel Chappuzeau.

== History of service ==
=== Campaign of 1713 ===
The first military task of Poltava began on 2 May 1713 when on the orders of Peter I the Kotlinski squadron led by Vice Admiral Cornelius Cruys (4 ships and 2 frigates) left Kronstadt for the Beryozovye Islands and Seskar to join the Reval squadron of Captain Commander Reis. The Cruys' squadron was tasked to hold a superior Swedish squadron by maneuvering in the open seas and attack their small groups. The two squadrons met on 8 May, and through the whole month Poltava was sailing at Beryozovye Islands, waiting for the preparations to attack Helsinki by the Finnish corps of Apraksin (infantry) and the Baltic Fleet.

Between 7 and 12 June 1713, the fleet was visited by Peter I, who brought 8 ships and a battalion of Preobrazhensky Regiment. Peter stayed on Poltava and inspected the fleet. On 2 July 1713, a Swedish squadron of Vice Admiral Lile (9 ships and two frigates) arrived to Helsinki, which was besieged by Russian troops. On 5 July, 3 more Swedish ships of the line blockaded Reval (now Tallinn) which then hosted five Russian warships recently purchased abroad. After receiving the news, on 4 July Peter I arrived in Kronstadt and raised his flag on Poltava. On 7 July, he ordered Cruys with his squadron to relieve the siege of Reval. On 9 July, together with 12 other ships Poltava left Kronstadt heading for the Reval. In the evening of 10 July the vanguard of the squadron spotted the three Swedish ships at the island of Gogland and began chasing them. However, the next morning the three Russian front ships, Vyborg, Riga and frigate Esperanza run aground and the Swedish ships managed to join the squadron of Lile at Helsinki. Poltava was part of the vanguard, but avoided being stranded. On 16 July, it reached Reval, joined the Russian ships there, and together they returned to Kronstadt on 25 July.

=== Campaign of 1714 ===
In the campaign of 1714, the Russian battleships were tasked to cover-up the galley fleet at Gangut. By early May the Russian fleet included 10 ships with 700 guns at Kronstadt and 7 ships (370 guns) at Reval. By summer, the fleet counted 25 ships with 1070 guns and more than 7000 crew.

Poltava left Kronstadt on 20 May and the next day reached Beryozovye Islands, covering the galley fleet. On 31 May, the fleet went to the south where it remained until the night of 4 June, and on 11 June arrived in Reval.

A Swedish squadron of six ships under the command of Vice Admiral Lile was spotted at Reval in the evening of 17 June. Together with 15 other Russian ships led by Peter I, Poltava for 13 hours chased the Swedish squadron. The pursuit was fruitless and the squadron returned to Reval. On 4 August, Poltava left Reval, arrived to Helsinki on 14 August, and on 24 August departed to Kronstadt for overwintering.

=== Campaigns of 1715–1717 ===
On 4 July 1715, within the squadron of Admiral Apraksin (30 ships and 40 galleys) Poltava left Kronstadt and on 8 July arrived in Reval to join the Anglo-Dutch fleet of Admiral John Norris. As Norris has not arrived there yet, the Russian fleet cruised between the nearby islands, and on 24 July met Norris at Reval. After 3 weeks, part of the fleet led by Apraksin left Reval, and nine ships, including Poltava, stayed in Reval for the winter.

On 27 January 1716, Peter I included Poltava in the squadron of Captain Commander Sievers for sailing to Copenhagen to join the Danish fleet and the Russian warships stationed in England and Denmark. For several reasons, the departure was delayed by several months. A Swedish squadron appeared near Copenhagen, and thus between 20 April and 12 May 1716 Poltava and Reval squadron cruised in the Baltic Sea. After the retreat of the Swedish ships the Russian squadron departed for Copenhagen and arrived there on 19 July. From 5 to 14 August, Poltava cruised in the Baltic Sea as part of the combined Russian, Danish, English and Dutch fleet, and on 22 October returned to Reval.

Between 4 June and 16 July 1717, Poltava was part of a squadron of 14 battleships led by Admiral Fyodor Apraksin. It cruised off the Swedish coast and covered landing of Russian troops on the island of Gotland. In early August of the same year, while chasing a Swedish 6-gun ship, Poltava ran aground and was sent for reparations to St. Petersburg.

=== Further service ===
From the end of July 1718 to 1719 the hull of Poltava was refitted at the St. Petersburg Admiralty under the direction of shipwright Blaise-Antoine Pangalo. In April 1720, she sailed to Kronstadt, and in June, within the squadron of Captain Commander Fangoft (9 ships), went to Reval.

On 5 May 1721, together with seven line ships, Poltava participated in the cruise operations in the Baltic Sea. On 9 May, during a heavy storm at Cape Dagerort, her masts were severely damaged, and the ship was left behind by the squadron. After 8 days, on 17 May, Poltava arrived in Reval and was sent for repairs to Kronstadt. In 1722–1723 the ship was used for crew training in the Gulf of Finland and after 1723 stayed in harbors. In early 1724 the Admiralty Board assesses the ship as capable to sailing, yet too old and unreliable for a military campaign. Thus on 13 May 1725, her guns were moved to the ship Moscow. From 1726 the ship was considered unfit because of its age and spent the next two years in Kronstadt waiting for repairs. On 16 January 1729, Poltava, together with Neptunus, Saint Alexander, Revel, Ingermanland and Moscow, was deemed irreparable and dismantled after 1732.

== Modeling and legacy ==
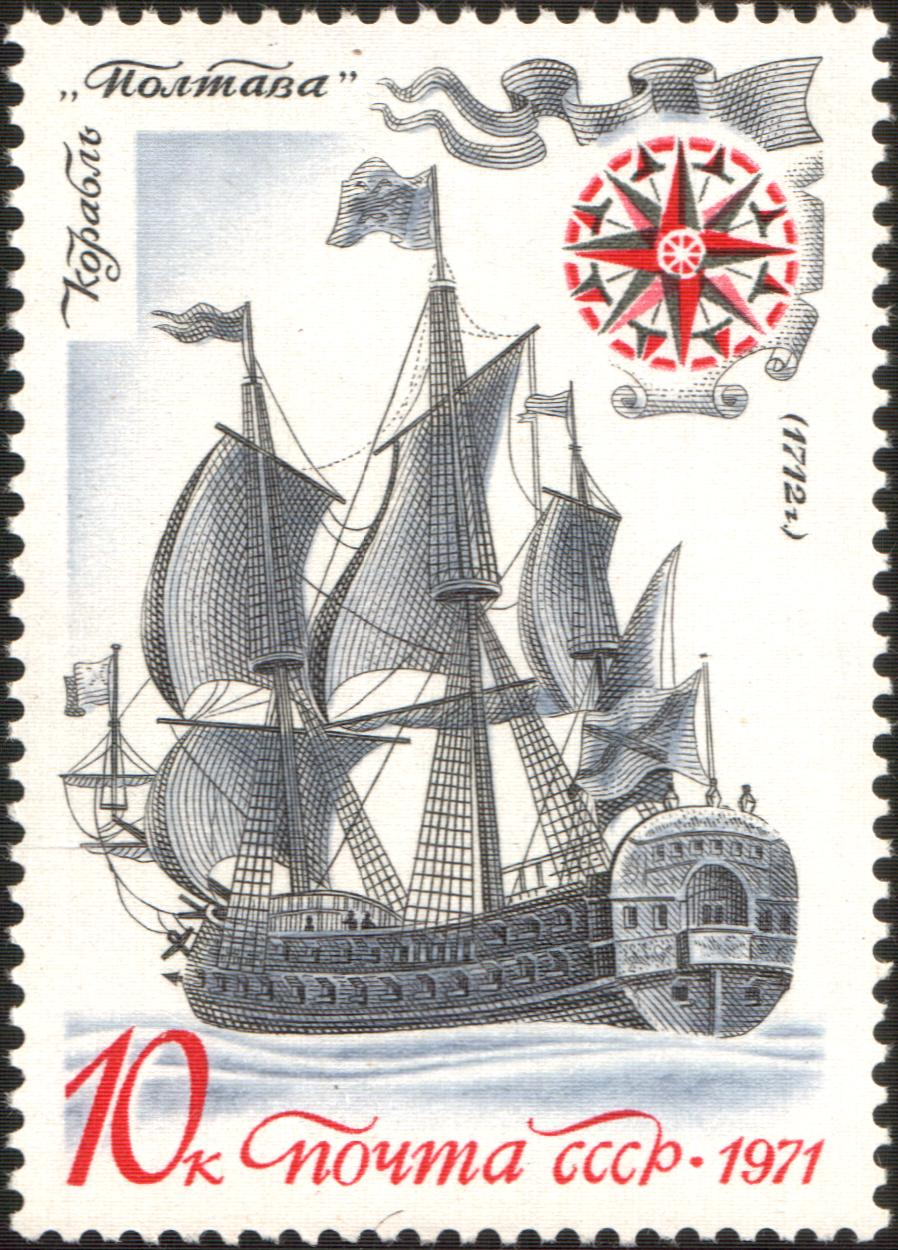
The Soviet post stamp featuring Poltava.

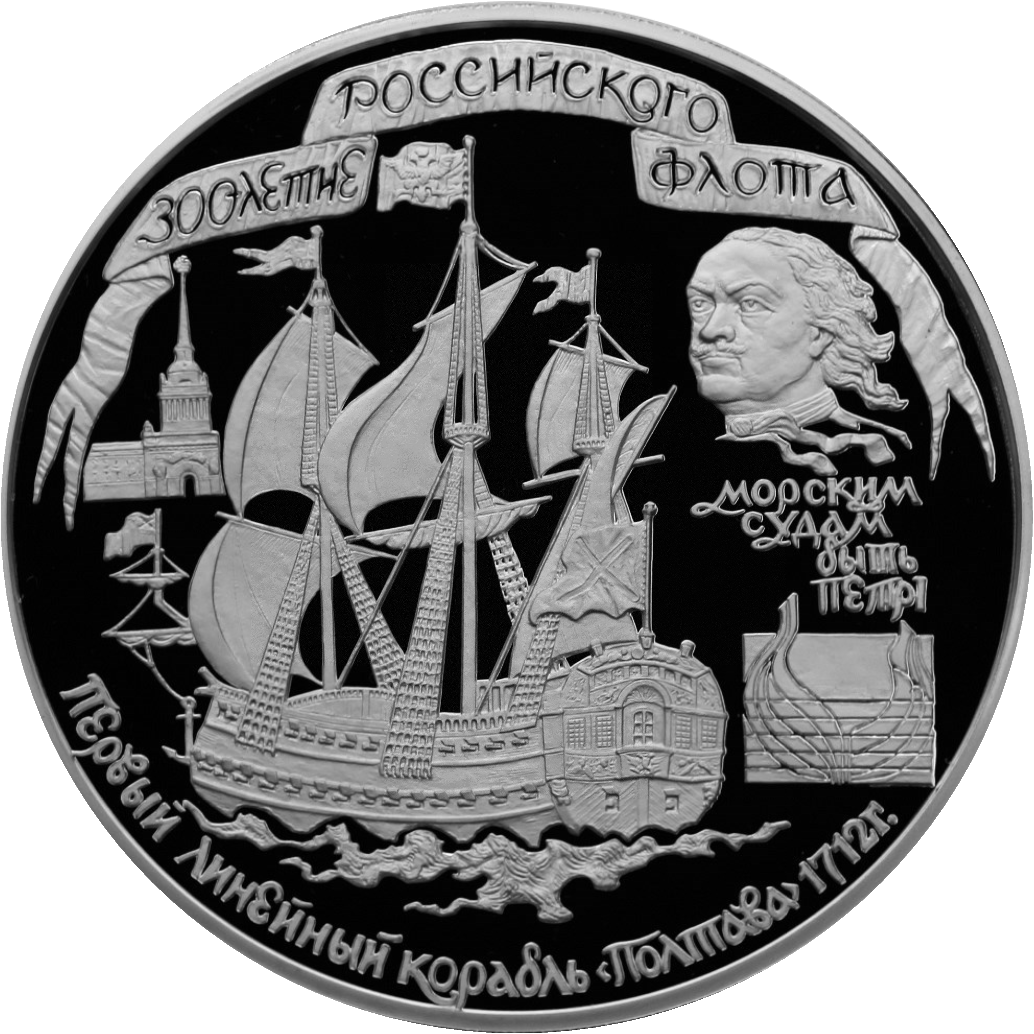
The 100-ruble commemorative coin featuring Poltava, Peter I and the Admiralty

Detailed modeling of Poltava is classed to the highest category of complexity and is carried out only by a few designers, though primitive copies appear in the open sale. One of the first detailed models of Poltava was built by V. P. Dubensky in 1:50 scale. A 1:36 model is being built since October 2007 by the Guild of Modelers of St. Petersburg. Another version was started in 2008 based on newly discovered original drawings of the ship.

On 29 May 2018 a full-sized replica on Poltava was launched at the St Petersburg Yacht club. She is intended to form the centrepiece of a new shipbuilding museum.

After dismantling of Poltava, its name was transferred from ship to ship 7 times. In 1971, the Soviet Post issued a stamp of 10 kopeks featuring the ship. In 1996, to honor the 300 anniversary of the Russian Navy, the Bank of Russia produced a series of 15 commemorative coins, each dedicated to one ship of the Russian fleet. The reverse of a 100-ruble coin depicted Poltava, Peter I and the Admiralty.

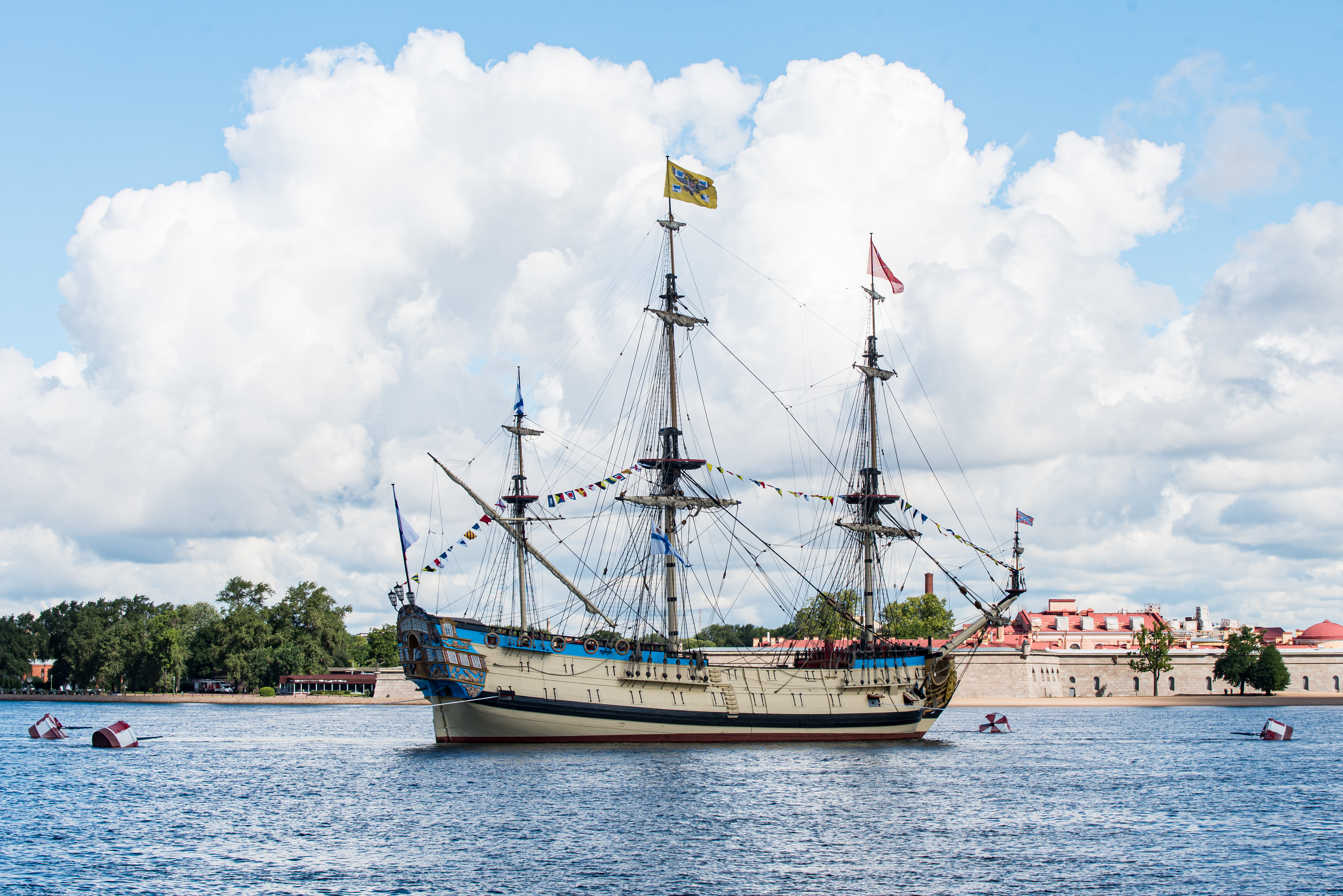
2018 full-sized replica of Poltava

== Bibliography ==
- Anderson RC (1969). Naval Wars in the Baltic. London.
- Bykhovskii IA (1982). Петровские корабелы (Peter's shipbuilders). St. Petersburg: Судостроение.
- Dan, John (1999). История Российского флота в царствование Петра Великого (History of the Russian Navy in the reign of Peter the Great). St. Petersburg. ISBN 9785895660065.
- Dubensky, VP (2000). "Балтийский первенец Петра. Oпыт реконструкции декора линейного корабля "Полтава". (The first Baltic ship of Peter. Experience of reconstructing decor of battleship Poltava)". Naval Collection. 5 (1). Moscow.
- Журнал, или Поденная записка блаженныя и вечныя достойныя памяти государя императора Петра Великого (Journal, or notes of Emperor Peter the Great) (PDF). Vol. 1. Academy of Sciences. 1770.
- Matveeva TM (1979). Убранство русских кораблей (The decor of the Russian ships). St. Petersburg: Судостроение.
- Myshlaevsky AZ (1896). Пётр Великий. Война в Финляндии в 1712–1714 годах. Совместная операция сухопутной армии, галерного и корабельного флотов (Peter the Great. The war in Finland in 1712–1714). Joint operation of the army, and the ship's galley fleets (PDF). St. Petersburg: Military Printing. Archived from the original (PDF) on 2012-03-18.
- Veselago FF (1872). Список русских военных судов с 1668 по 1860 год (List of Russian warships from 1668 to 1860). St. Petersburg: Marine Ministry.
- Veselago FF (1875). Очерк русской морской истории (Essays on Russian naval history). Vol. I. St. Petersburg: Demakov Printing House.
