= Litvinovich =

Litvinovich is a Belarusian surname derived from the nickname litvin ("Lithuanian" or anyone from the Grand Duchy of Lithuania). Notable people with the surname include:

- Ivan Litvinovich (born 2001), Belarusian trampoline gymnast
- Marina Litvinovich (born 1982), Russian opposition activist and politician
