= Lefortovo Prison =

Prison in Moscow

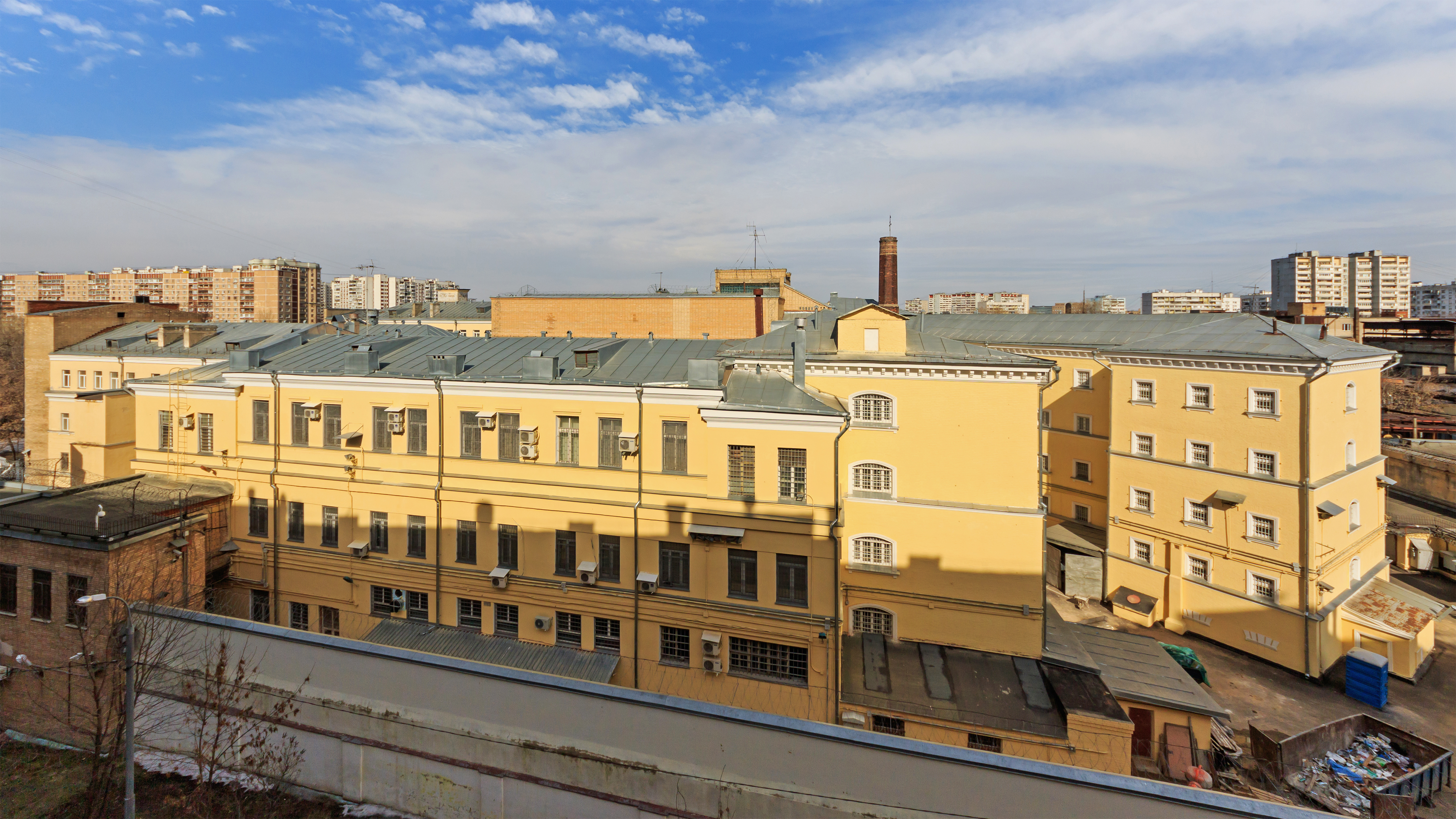
- Interactive map of Lefortovo Prison
- Location: Moscow, Russia; 55.7611407°N 37.7062039°E
- Status: Operational
- Security class: Detention center
- Opened: 1881
- Managed by: Ministry of Justice

Lefortovo Prison (Russian: Лефортовская тюрьма, romanized: Lefortovskaya tyurma, Russian: [lʲɪˈfortəvə]) is a prison in Moscow, Russia, which has been under the jurisdiction of the Russian Ministry of Justice since 2005.

== History ==
The prison was built in 1881 in the Lefortovo District of Moscow, named after François Le Fort, a close associate of Tsar Peter I the Great.

In the Soviet Union, during Joseph Stalin's 1936–38 Great Purge, Lefortovo Prison was used by the NKVD secret police for mass executions and interrogational torture. Later Lefortovo was an infamous KGB prison and interrogation site (called an "investigative isolator", or СИЗО: следственный изолятор) for political prisoners.

In 1994, the prison was transferred to the MVD; from 1996 to 2005, it was under the jurisdiction of the FSB, a KGB successor agency. The prison is said to have strict detention conditions. Only visits by lawyers are allowed. Letters can be received but are read by prison officials.

== Notable prisoners ==
- Several members of the 1991 Soviet coup d'état attempt
- Several members of the 1993 Russian constitutional crisis rebellion, including Ruslan Khasbulatov and Alexander Rutskoi
- Igor Artimovich
- Nikita Belykh, politician and former leader of the Union of Rightist Forces party
- Sergey Beseda, former head of the Fifth Service under President Putin until the 2022 invasion of Ukraine; reportedly imprisoned over intelligence failures and embezzlement.
- Frode Berg, Norwegian spy
- Boris Kolesnikov
- Evan Gershkovich American journalist arrested for espionage
- Nikolai Glushkov
- Grigori Grabovoi, sect leader
- Eston Kohver
- Vladimir Kumarin, businessman and gangster
- Platon Lebedev
- Eduard Limonov
- Alexander Litvinenko
- Vil Mirzayanov
- Zarema Muzhakhoyeva, terrorist
- Sviatoslav Palamar Kalyna, Ukrainian Army Captain, Deputy Commander of Azov Brigade
- Denys Prokopenko Redis, Ukrainian Army Lieutenant Colonel, Commander of Azov Brigade
- Leonid Razvozzhayev
- Sergei Ryakhovsky, serial killer
- Yaqub Salimov, mobster and former Minister of the Interior of Tajikistan
- Ivan Safronov, journalist
- Sergei Skripal
- Igor Sutyagin
- Serhii Volynskyi Volyna, Ukrainian Army Major, Commander of 36th Marine Infantry Brigade
- Paul Whelan, American arrested in Moscow for espionage (citizen of the United States, Canada, United Kingdom and Ireland).

=== Soviet era ===
- Vasily Blyukher, marshall of the Soviet Union
- Vladimir Bukovsky
- Nicholas Daniloff
- Alexander Dolgun
- Hugo Eberlein
- Bernt Ivar Eidsvig, courier of the anti-communist National Alliance of Russian Solidarists, later Catholic Bishop of Oslo
- Rashid Khan Gaplanov, Education and Finance Minister of Azerbaijan Democratic Republic
- Yevgenia Ginzburg
- Chingiz Ildyrym, Azerbaijani Bolshevik and statesman
- Ekaterina Kalinina, wife of Mikhail Kalinin
- Vladimir Kirpichnikov
- Zoya Krakhmalnikova, Soviet Christian dissident
- Levon Mirzoyan
- Unto Parvilahti, SS-Officer
- Osip Piatnitsky
- Lina Prokofiev, wife of Sergei Prokofiev
- Ian Rokotov (Rokotov-Faibishenko case)
- Mathias Rust, 18-year-old West German who landed a Cessna 172 airplane near Red Square.
- Valery Sablin, soviet navy captain who attempted an armed rebellion in 1975
- Natan Sharansky, Jewish dissident
- Andrei Sinyavsky
- Aleksandr Solzhenitsyn
- Kazimierz Szpądrowski (1899–1940), Polish Army intelligence officer and head of the Katowice outpost, executed in Lefortovo on 25 December 1940
- Jean-Christian Tirat, French journalist and supporter of compliance with the Helsinki Agreement
- Nadezhda Ulanovskaya, wife of Alexander Ulanovsky
- Khalil Rza Uluturk, Azerbaijani poet and nationalist.
- Raoul Wallenberg
- Helmuth Weidling, Wehrmacht general

== References in popular culture ==
- Apple TV+ show For All Mankind Season 3 Episode 5 - Character Sergei Nikulov claims he was a prisoner where he was tortured by the KGB for sharing too much information about the Roscosmos programs
- Peacock show PONIES Season 1 Episode 5 - Character Manya, while posing as Vera, is detained by the KGB and threatened with imprisonment in Lefortovo Prison
- 2025 Novel "Midnight Black" by Mark Greaney, character Zoya Zakharova was briefly imprisoned after in Lefortovo
- The Bureau Season 4 Episode 3 - The protagonist, Malotru, was imprisoned in Lefortovo Prison

== See also ==
- Qincheng Prison
- Lubyanka Prison
- Sukhanovka Prison
