= Marina Litvinovich =

Russian opposition activist and politician

- Марина Литвинович
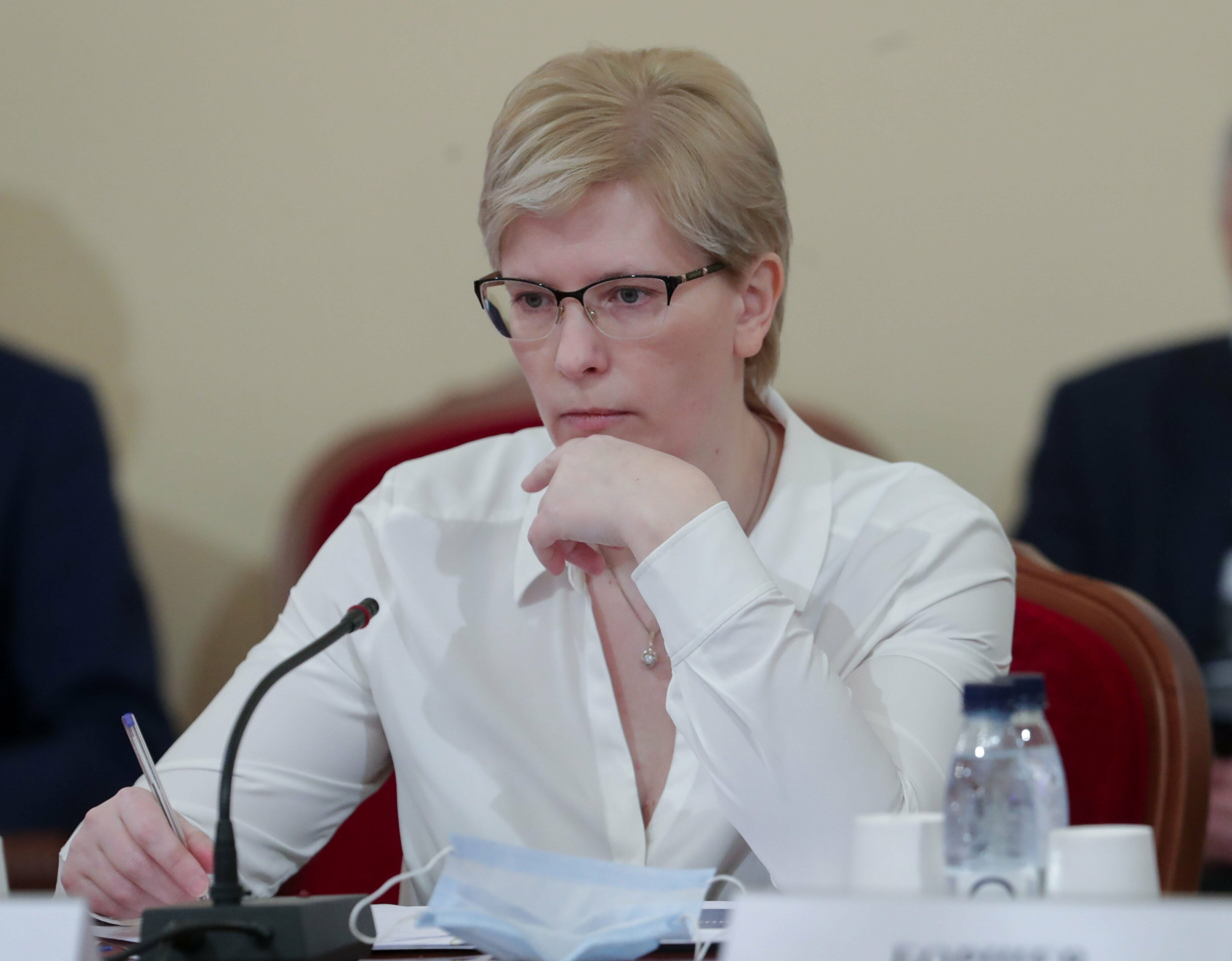
- Marina Litvinovich in 2022
- Born: Marina Alekseyevna Litvinovich; September 19, 1974 (age 51); Moscow, Soviet Union
- Education: Moscow State University (1998)
- Occupations: Journalist, campaign manager, politician
- Political party: Union of Right Forces (2003); Open Russia (2003); Our Choice (2004); Free Russia (2004); The Other Russia (2006—2008); Committee 2008 (2008); Civic Platform (2014); Party of Growth (2016); Civic Initiative

Marina Alekseyevna Litvinovich (Russian: Марина Алексеевна Литвинович, born 19 September 1974) is a Russian opposition activist and politician.

== Life ==
Litvinovich became active in politics in 1996. In the late 1990s she created Russia's first political website for Boris Nemtsov, at that point deputy prime minister. Nemtsov later became a highly visible opponent of Vladimir Putin's regime, until he was shot and killed in Moscow in 2015. For two years Litvinovich herself worked for Putin, helping his campaign in the 2000 Russian presidential election:

I set up the first online presidential conference in Russia, and before it we sat down and I taught him about the internet and how to use it.

Though she considered running for political office as early as 2003, Litvinovich continued working as a political consultant for other people's campaigns. She was a consultant for Mikhail Khodorkovsky, who was Russia's richest oligarch until he was jailed for a decade after falling afoul of the Kremlin. She later worked as an assistant to opposition politician Garry Kasparov, acting as a spokesperson for his United Civil Front. In April 2007 she complained of Kasparov's questioning by the FSB, the Russian state security agency:

The FSB is equating dissatisfaction with the current Russian leadership with extremism [...] If you shout a slogan against Putin, you are labelled an extremist.

In July 2007 Litvinovich highlighted the case of opposition activist Larisa Arap, who had been forced into a psychiatric clinic. In November 2007 she reported Kasparov's beating by police as he attempted to lead a protest rally. In December 2007 she announced that Kasparov would not be running for the presidency, as his supporters had been unable to rent a hall for his nomination gathering.

From 2019 to 2021 Litvinovich served on the Moscow Public Monitoring Commission (ONK), a watchdog monitoring the condition of inmates in Russian prisons. In March 2021 Litvinovich was excluded from the ONK, on the grounds that she had disclosed information relating to a probe into Lyubov Sobol, a lawyer for the jailed opposition politician Alexei Navalny's Anti-Corruption Foundation. Litvinovich disputed the allegation, claiming the exclusion was due to her activism on behalf of people detained in Lefortovo detention center.

In 2021 Litvinovich ran in Russia's parliamentary elections as a candidate for the State Duma:

I believe we need to fight to the end [...] And if I don't do it then who will? There's almost no one left.

On 24 February 2022, as Russia invaded Ukraine, Litvinovich called for antiwar protests in Russian cities. She was detained by Russian police as she left her house.

On May 31, 2024, she was declared a foreign agent by the Ministry of Justice of the Russian Federation.

== PravdaBeslana.ru ==
PravdaBeslana.ru is a website for Mothers of Beslan, created by Litvinovich to post materials related to the investigation of the Beslan school siege.
