= Russian ship of the line Lefort =

Imperatritsa Aleksandra-class ship of the line of the Imperial Russian Navy

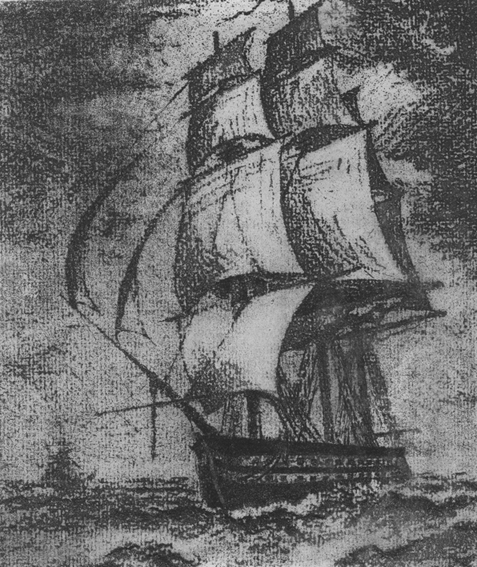

History

Russia
- Name: Lefort
- Namesake: Franz Lefort
- Laid down: 1833
- Launched: 9 August 1835
- Fate: Capsized and sunk 22 September 1857 59°57′N 27°17′E

General characteristics
- Class & type: Imperatritsa Aleksandra
- Tonnage: 3,500 tonnes (7,700,000 lb)
- Length: 58.3 m (191 ft)
- Beam: 15.6 m (51 ft)
- Draft: 6.6 m (22 ft)
- Propulsion: Sails
- Crew: 743 sailors, 13 officers
- Armament: 94 guns

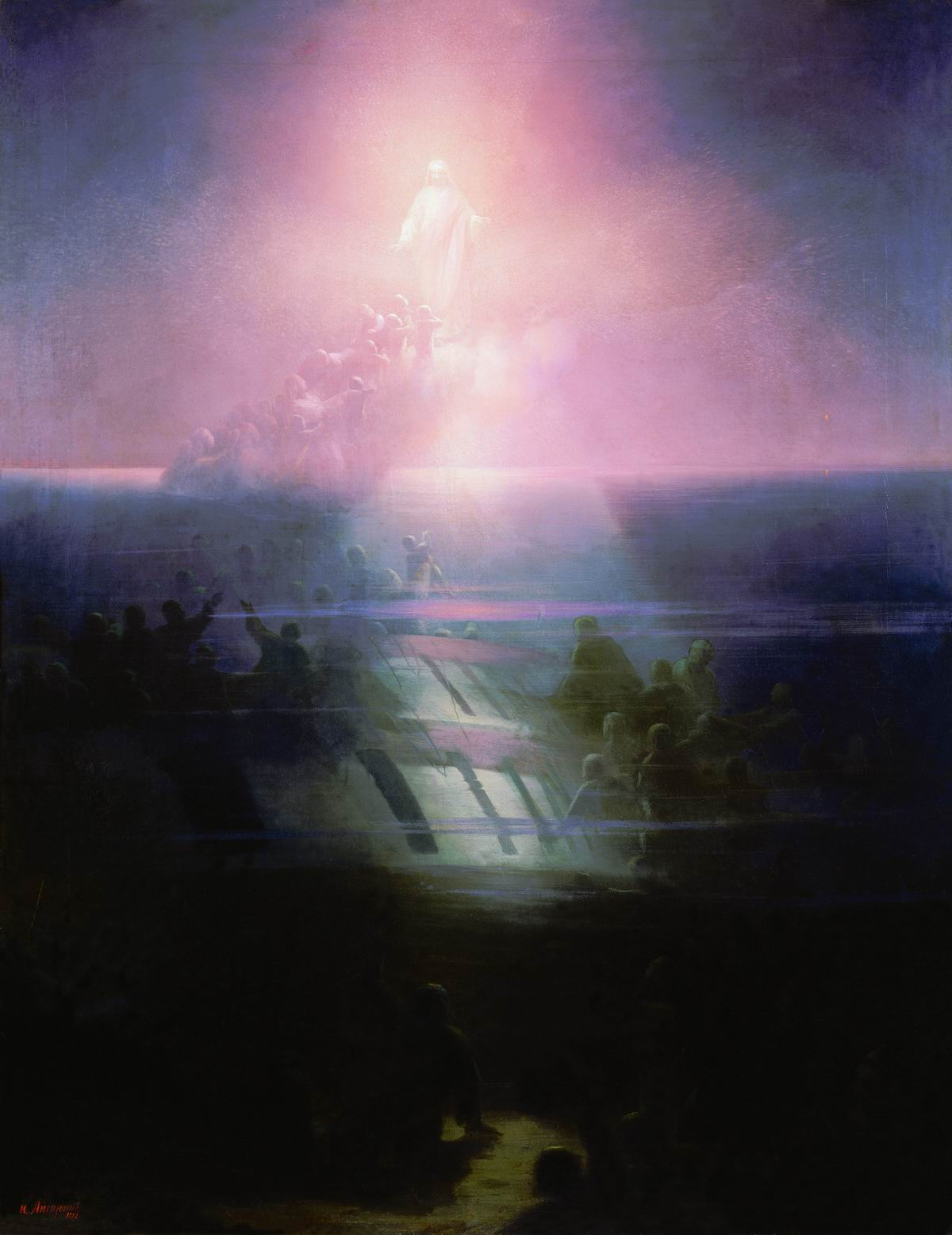
Shipwreck of the "Lefort" (painting by Ivan Aivazovsky)

Lefort (Russian: Лефорт; also spelled "Leffort") was an Imperatritsa Aleksandra–class ship of the line of the Imperial Russian Navy, rated at 84 guns but actually armed with 94 guns. Her keel was laid in 1833 at Saint Petersburg and she was launched 9 August [O.S. 28 July] 1835 in the presence of Nicholas I. She was named after Admiral Franz Lefort, the head of the Russian Navy from 1695 to 1696.

Upon commissioning, Lefort joined the Russian Baltic Fleet. During the Crimean War she aided in the defence of Kronstadt in 1854 against a Franco-British fleet, but did not see combat.

On the morning of 22 September [O.S. 10 September] 1857, the Lefort was in the Gulf of Finland en route from Reval (present day Tallinn, Estonia) to Kronstadt along with the ships Imperatritsa Aleksandra, Vladimir, and Pamiat Asova, under the command of Rear Admiral I. Nordman. The ship had on board 756 crew and officers, 53 women, and 17 children (families of the crew). The squadron was caught in a sudden squall, and the Lefort heeled over once, righted herself, and heeled over again, capsizing and sinking between the islands of Gogland and Bolshoy Tyuters, five and a half nautical miles (10.2 km; 6.3 mi) north-northeast of Bolshoy Tyuters, with the loss of 826 people on board, although one sailor had been saved by holding on to a beam and floating to Gogland. The same storm wrecked about 30 ships off the Baltic coast of Russia.

A board of inquiry investigating the disaster recognized as the most probable cause of the accident the weakening of the ship ties; Lefort had twice been used to transport heavy loads on the gun decks in 1856. The inquiry also alleged that the ship's hull had not been adequately caulked, and that the cargo load was too small and incorrectly arranged. In addition, it was speculated that the gun ports had been left open to provide fresh air for the passengers; this may have contributed to the sinking of the ship through water ingress when the ship first heeled over.

The wreck of Lefort was found in the Gulf of Finland on 4 May 2013, as part of an international underwater search expedition.

== See also ==
- List of ships of the line of Russia
