= Voice of Beslan =

Political advocacy group in Russia

Voice of Beslan (Russian: Голос Беслана, romanized: Golos Beslana) is a grassroots non-governmental organization created in the aftermath of the 2004 North Ossetian Beslan school siege, as a splinter group of more radical members of the Mothers of Beslan support and advocacy group of parents of children who were among the victims.

The group was created in response to what they see as the incompetence and excessive force used by the security services, especially with regard to the firing from tanks and flame throwers at the school. Voice of Beslan is chaired by sisters Ella Kesayeva and Emma Tagayeva. It has received funds from the US National Endowment for Democracy.

== Activities ==
Voice of Beslan have demanded an international investigation of the Beslan terrorist attack and in November 2005 called on the European Union and the European Parliament to help establish one, as well as on the United States leadership to publish satellite photographs of the school made during the siege. They have also asked private journalists with any material on the attack to present it for an investigation.

Between February 9 and February 19, 2006, six members of Voice of Beslan held a 10-day hunger strike to draw attention to their claims that authorities were covering up the truth about the Beslan attack. On February 22, 2006, members of Voice of Beslan met with United Nations High Commissioner for Human Rights Louise Arbour.

In 2007 members of the group erected a sign pointing at the ruins of the Beslan school reading "Putin's course". Same year, the Supreme Court of North Ossetia had obliged the court of the city of Beslan to consider the claim of the Voice of Beslan on appointing pensions to parents of the children who perished in the siege.

In February 2008 the group has filed a complaint against the actions of the investigatory group which was in charge of forensic medical examination of victims' bodies. The complaint was rejected the next month.

== Split ==
On August 28, 2007, a court in Vladikavkaz has ruled that a group must change leaders to those less critical of the Kremlin and register again.

On December 21, 2007, a supreme court of North Ossetia has ordered the Voice of Beslan to disband. In response, its activists started a protest hunger strike. "The decision was made by the authorities because our organization is fighting for the right to have a fair investigation of what happened in Beslan," group founder Ella Kesayeva said. The court refused to hear witnesses who said that the election of the new chairperson was falsified.

In February 2008 the group changed its name to Voice of Beslan All-Russian Public Organization of Terror Act Victims and decided it will not get registered again, saying that such form of public organization without registration is possible under the Russian federal law. Another group called Voice of Beslan continues to exist.

Infighting and internal strife occurred as a result of the politicized activities.

== Persecution ==
In January 2008 Russian prosecutors in Nazran, Ingushetia, laid extremism charges against campaigners over a 2005 appeal the group issued to politicians in Europe and the United States. After several Ingush public figures have come out strongly against the harassment of the organization, the trial was transferred to North Ossetia. The group could be banned if found extremist.

In a public appeal, Voice of Beslan asked the Russian president Vladimir Putin to stop prosecuting the organization. Putin answered that the issue is beyond his competence. After receiving a reply, Kesayeva has stated "the end of illusions" in relation to Putin. The group threatened to use a legal action brought by authorities against them to expose Putin's role in Beslan tragedy.

Several other charges against the group soon followed (the total of four cases as of February 2008). In one, the group was accused of beating up court bailiffs. The group said prosecutors are fabricating assault charges to punish them for seeking the truth about the siege.

== See also ==
- Mothers of Beslan
