= Cornelius Cruys =

Norwegian-born naval officer (1655–1727)

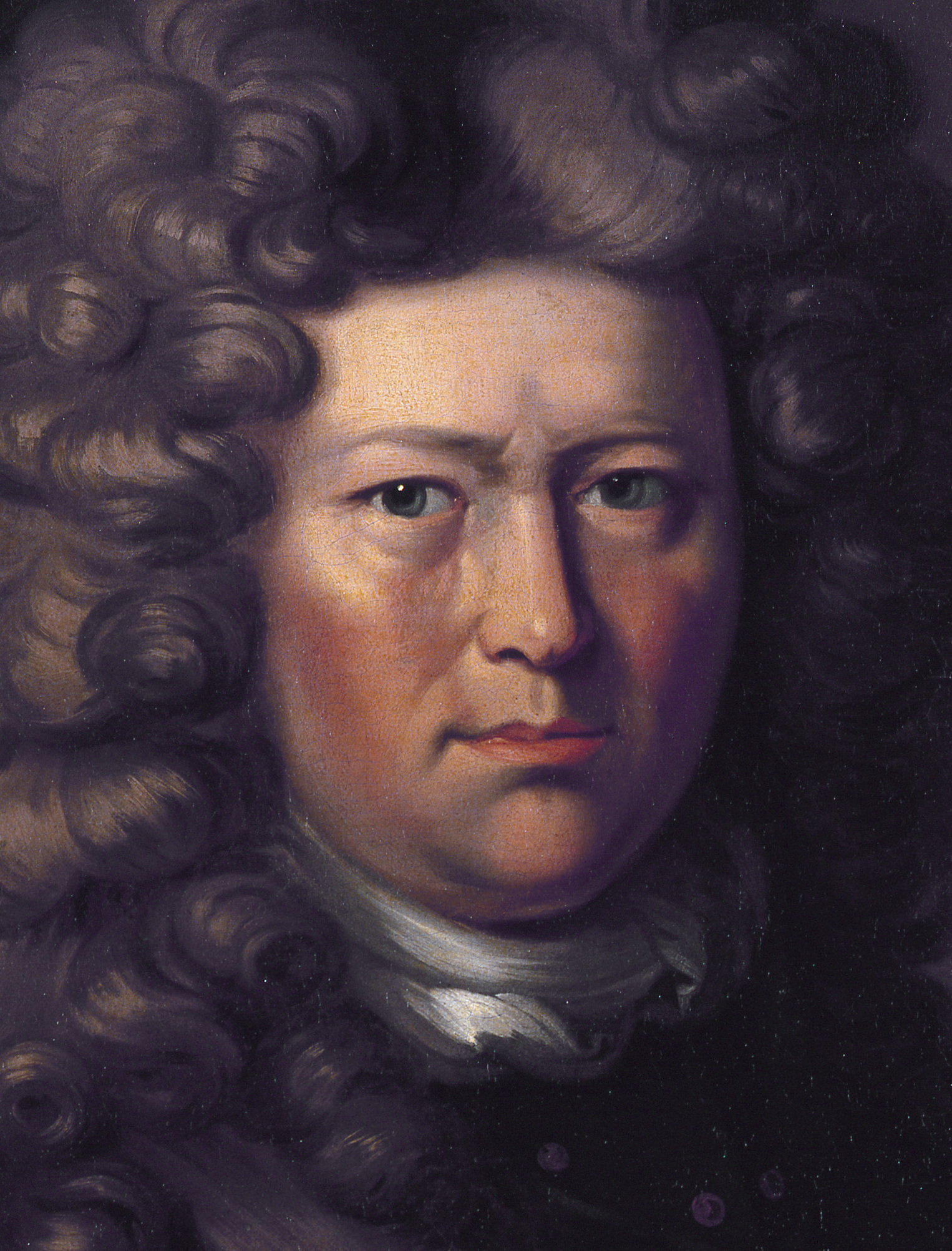
- Portrait (c. 1709–1714)
- Born: Niels Olsen Creutz; 14 June 1655; Stavanger, Denmark–Norway
- Died: 14 June 1727 (aged 72); Saint Petersburg, Russia
- Burial place: Oude Kerk, Amsterdam
- Spouse: Catharina Voogt (m. 1681)
- Military career
- Allegiance: Dutch Republic (1696); Russia (1698)
- Branch: Admiralty of Amsterdam; Imperial Russian Navy
- Service years: 1696–1727
- Rank: Admiral
- Wars: Great Northern War; Defense of Kotlin; Battle of Gogland

Cornelius Cruys (Note: Russian: Корнилий Иванович Крюйс, romanized: Kornily Ivanovich Kryuys; alternatively: Корнелий Иванович Крюйс, Kornely Ivanovich Kryuys.) (born Niels Olufsen; 14 June 1655 – 14 June 1727) was a Norwegian-born naval officer who served in the Dutch States Navy and Imperial Russian Navy. He was the first commander of the Russian Baltic Fleet.

== Early life and career ==
He was born Niels Olufsen in Stavanger, Norway, in 1655. His parents were Oluf Gudfastesen and Apelone Nielsdatter Koch. It is uncertain when Niels Olufsen (Dutch: Cornelis Roelofsz) emigrated to the Dutch Republic and changed his name to Cornelis Cruys ("Kornelius Krøys" or "Cornelis Cruijs"). However, according to several municipal sources, Cruys lived in Amsterdam for at least eighteen years before he joined the Imperial Russian Navy.

The first known record about Cruys was produced by the local administration of Amsterdam in 1681. That year he married the nineteen-year-old Catharina Voogt. She was born in Amsterdam and was the daughter of Claas Pieterszoon Voogt, a Dutch captain of a merchantman, and Jannetje Jans. In the civil registration of his marriage, Cruys was called a sailor from Amsterdam, 24 years old, an orphan. In December of that year, about seven months after his marriage, Cruys was officially registered as a citizen or poorter of Amsterdam.

In 1680, Cruys became the captain of a Dutch merchantman. Until 1696, he sailed to Portugal, Spain, and the Caribbean. In July 1696, he joined the Dutch States Navy. He was appointed onder-equipagemeester at the naval dockyard of the Amsterdam Admiralty. In less than two years he would leave the Dutch Republic for Russia.

== Service in Russia ==
In 1697, Peter I of Russia travelled incognito with a large Russian delegation – the so-called Grand Embassy. He visited the Dutch Republic to study the latest inventions, especially in shipbuilding. Thanks to the mediation of Nicolaas Witsen, mayor of Amsterdam and expert on Russia par excellence, Peter I was given the opportunity to gain practical experience in the largest private shipyard in the world, belonging to the Dutch East India Company in Amsterdam, for a period of four months. He helped with the construction of an East Indiaman, the frigate Peter en Paul.

During his stay in the Dutch Republic, Peter I worked alongside, with the help of Russian and Dutch assistants, many skilled workers such as builders of locks, fortresses, shipwrights and seamen. They helped him with his modernization of Russia. The best-known sailor who made the journey from the Dutch republic to Russia was Cruys. Cruys accepted Peter I's generous offer to enter into his service as vice-admiral. He emigrated to Russia in 1698 and became the tsar's most important adviser in maritime affairs.

Cruys performed well in Russia and came to be regarded as the architect of the Imperial Russian Navy. After his return to Russia, Peter I put the Azov Flotilla under the command of Admiral Fyodor Alexeyevich Golovin, a Russian nobleman who was the successor of the Swiss officer Franz Lefort. Golovin was assisted by Vice-Admiral Cruys and Rear-Admiral Jan van Rees. Cruys became the first mayor of Taganrog from 1698 to 1702.

In 1711, he made the first maps of Azov Sea and Don River. He was commander of the Russian Baltic Fleet from 1705, and masterminded the construction of Kronstadt fortress, which was essential in the Great Northern War against Sweden and many years later against the German Kriegsmarine during World War II. Cruys worked for the tsar for more than 25 years and reached the highest Russian naval rank of admiral in 1721. He died at Saint Petersburg in 1727.

The historic Kotomin House at Nevsky Prospect, built from 1812 to 1815, was constructed on the site of the former residence of Cornelius Cruys.

== Bibliography ==
- Aase, Roy Lauritz (1997) Admiral Cornelius Cruys: sjøhelten fra Stavanger (Erling Skjalgssonselskapet) ISBN 8291640033
- Koningsbrugge, Hans van ed. (2009) Life and deeds of Admiral Cornelius Cruys (Groningen: Nederlands-Russisch Archiefcentrum) ISBN 978-90-77089-05-7
- Titlestad, Torgrim (1999) Tsarens admiral: Cornelius Cruys i Peter den stores tjeneste (Erling Skjalgssonselskapet) ISBN 978-8291640075
