= Mothers of Beslan =

Russian activist group

- Staff: Susanna Dudiyeva, chairperson Ella Kesayeva, founder Marina Litvinovich, webmaster (2006)
- Volunteers: > 200 (2006)
- Website: www.pravdabeslana.ru

Mothers of Beslan (Russian: Матери Беслана, romanized: Matyeri Beslana) or Beslan Mothers' Committee (Комитет матерей Беслана, Komitet matyerey Beslana) is a support and advocacy group of parents whose children were among the more than 1128 victims of the 2004 Beslan school hostage crisis in North Ossetia–Alania. The group is led by chairwoman Susanna Dudiyeva and as of 2006 has nearly 200 members. Marina Litvinovich, who helped to create the Mothers, runs the website.

== History ==
Mothers of Beslan was created February 25, 2005, in the aftermath of the hostage crisis as a response to what was seen as the incompetence and excessive force used by the security services during the rescue attempt. They are also investigating negligence and corruption of the North Ossetian leadership, notably the former president Alexander Dzasokhov, whose resignation was demanded by the group.

They are highly critical of the president of Russia Vladimir Putin for allegedly covering up the circumstances of the siege. According to the Mothers of Beslan the terrorists made use of weapons and supplies that had been pre-positioned in the school, suggesting it was an inside job by school employees or town officials. This version of the events strongly contradicts the official narrative. The group met with Putin in Moscow on September 1, 2005.

In 2005, about 30 members of Mothers of Beslan, led by Ella Kesayev, split to form a second group, the Voice of Beslan.

In September 2005, some members of Mothers of Beslan, including Dudiyeva, were involved in a debacle with the self-proclaimed healer and miracle-maker Grigory Grabovoy, who had promised he could resurrect their murdered children for a large sum of money. The group subsequently denounced Grabovoy as a fraud and a charlatan, and asserted that his actions were part of a campaign to discredit Mothers of Beslan. Grabovoy was officially indicted of fraud in April 2006. A group of parents left the organization, with some forming Voice of Beslan.

In July 2007, the Mothers of Beslan asked the FSB to declassify video and audio archives on Beslan, saying there should be no secrets in the investigation. with no response to the request. That month, the Mothers organization released a video tape that they had received anonymously, claiming that it proves Russian security forces started the massacre by firing rocket grenades on the besieged building. The film, apparently showing the prosecutors and military experts discussing the militant bombs and structural damage in the school in Beslan, had been kept secret by the authorities for nearly three years, until released by the Mothers, on September 4, 2007.

In September 2007, Taimuraz Chedzhemov, the lawyer representing the group in seeking to prosecute Russian officials over the massacre response, said he had pulled out of the case after receiving a death threat.

== See also ==
- Union of the Committees of Soldiers' Mothers of Russia
- Voice of Beslan
