= Fartsovka =

Black-market importation and retail of foreign consumer goods in the USSR

Fartsovka (Russian: фарцовка) is a slang term for the black market profiteering, illegal in the Soviet Union, that consisted in resale of goods manufactured abroad, which were hard to find and inaccessible to an average Soviet citizen. Clothing and fashion accessories were the overwhelming majority of supply and demand for fartsovka. Also popular were audio media (vinyl records, cassette tapes, and reels), cosmetics, household items, and books. Fartsovka items, or the phenomenon itself, was generally called fartsa. The traders of this type were called fartsovshchiki.

The phenomenon was widely active from the late 1950s until the collapse of the Soviet Union in 1991.

== Etymology ==
The exact origin of the term fartsovka is uncertain, but one account suggests that it was derived from an archaic word from the Odessa dialect of Russian, "forets" (форец): a man who bought cheap items and sold them at dishonestly expensive prices.

== Description ==
There were two main sources of purchase of fartsa: from foreigners visiting the Soviet Union, and from contrabandists. Fartsovshchiki were mainly young people, as well as people who had the opportunity to closely communicate with foreigners, such as guides, translators, taxi drivers, and prostitutes.

The vast majority of buyers in the market for goods sold on the black market in the 1950s and 1960s were the so-called stilyagi. Later, in the 1970s and 1980s, everyone who had money and wanted to dress in an original way purchased imported consumer goods or equipment, books, or imported musical records, and resorted to the services of black marketeers. During these years, the sources of fartsovka also changed, and the concept itself acquired a broader meaning. The main occupation of most of those who were called black marketers became buying through acquaintances who had connections or the opportunity to travel abroad, allowing them to acquire scarce goods and foodstuffs.

A notable fartsovshchik and foreign currency speculator was Yan Rokotov, involved in the Rokotov–Faibishenko case.

== Legal status ==
Fartsovka was prosecuted under the Soviet criminal code for "Speculation" (Спекуляция)—the buying and reselling of goods for profit. Initially governed by Article 107 of the 1926 RSFSR Criminal Code, it was later codified under Article 88 of the 1960 RSFSR Criminal Code, and subsequently Article 154 in the late 1980s.

Because fartsovka often involved foreign currency and the distribution of "bourgeois" ideology via cultural items, it was treated more harshly than the speculation of domestic goods. Punishments ranged from heavy fines and confiscation of property to imprisonment in corrective labor camps (Gulag) for up to 15 years. In cases involving exceptionally large sums of foreign currency or organized smuggling rings, the death penalty by firing squad could be applied.

The most infamous legal precedent was the Rokotov–Faibishenko case (1960–1961). Yan Rokotov and his accomplices ran a massive foreign currency and fartsa speculation ring. Initially sentenced to 8 years in a labor camp, the case was reviewed by the RSFSR Supreme Court under intense pressure from Nikita Khrushchev, who demanded harsher punishment to deter black-marketeers. The court retroactively applied a newly enacted law allowing the death penalty for large-scale speculation, overturning the original sentence. Rokotov, Vladimir Faibishenko, and Nikolai Yakovlev were executed by firing squad in 1961. This case established a judicial precedent that allowed the death penalty for economic crimes in the USSR.

== See also ==
- Second economy of the Soviet Union
- Beryozka (Russian retail store)
- Gombeen man
- Spiv
- Wide boy
- Ticket scalping

== Links ==
- P. Romanov, M. Suvorova "Pure Fartsa"
- Mikhail Weller . The legend about the founder of Fartsovka Fima Blyaishits - the history, essence, mechanism of fartsovka are presented artistically.
- "How the blacksmiths of the 80s died out"
- Baikov V.D. Leningrad Chronicles: from the post-war 50s to the "dashing 90s". M. Karamzin, 2017 .-- 486 p., Ill. - ISBN 978-5-00071-516-1
