= Rokotov–Faibishenko case =

1961 Soviet show trial against financial speculators

The Rokotov–Faibishenko case was a criminal trial against financial speculators, that took place in the Soviet Union in 1961. It also marked the start of a three-year campaign against large-scale economic crimes, accompanied by show trials.

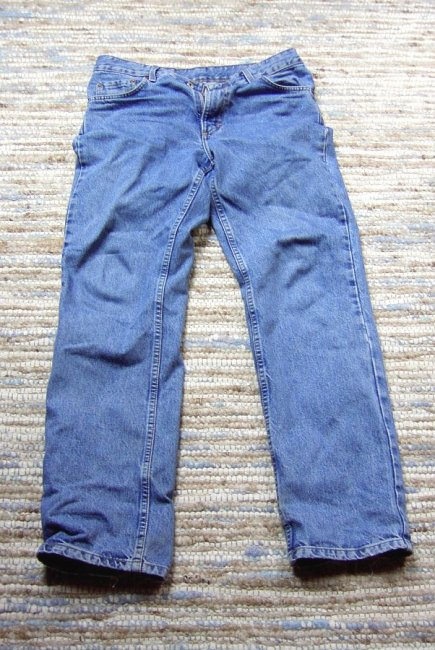
Western-made jeans among the contrabands that Yan Rokotov and Vladislav Faibishenko, together with their group, try to smuggle into the Soviet Union.

== History ==
=== Background and arrests ===
Ever since the 6th World Festival of Youth and Students, held in Moscow in 1957, dealing in foreign currency had begun to take place on a fairly large scale despite being illegal. Soviets (generally, of a young age) would buy foreign currency from tourists and other visitors, selling it for a profit.

In 1961, the authorities broke one such speculation ring, composed of nine people, which had acquired around 20 million rubles in a year. During the search, they found: 344,000 rubles, 1,524 gold coins, about $19,000, almost £500, 3,345 new and 133,000 old French francs, (Note: The franc was revalued in 1960.) 1,500 West German marks, 8,500 Belgian francs, other currency, icons and other contraband. The KGB investigated the case because contact with foreigners was involved.

Those arrested were: Yan Rokotov, I.I. Lagun, the married couple Nadya Edlis and Sergei Popov (a pianist), the brothers Yash and Shalva Papismedov, their nephew, Ilya (the three of whom bought gold from Edlis and sold it in Georgia), Vladislav Petrovich Faibishenko and Mubashirya Rizvanova.

Rokotov and Faibishenko had a history of making profit, which was not only illegal in the USSR, but also looked down upon as immoral, as it went against the country's Leninist ideology. Rokotov had traded in stamps, books and camera equipment (an occupation known as fartsovka) in school and moved up to foreign clothing, before entering the currency business. Faibishenko had bought and sold foreign stockings and chewing gum during the 1957 youth festival.

Rokotov (at least) was held in Lefortovo prison, prior to the trial.

=== Initial case and sentencings ===
The case was tried in Moscow City Court, beginning on 31 May 1961. The trial lasted thirteen days. On 15 June, Rokotov, Faibishenko and Edlis were sentenced to fifteen years' imprisonment and confiscation of all property. Lagun, the Papismedov brothers, and Rizvanova received eight-year sentences and had their illegally obtained property confiscated. Ilya Papismedov was sent to prison for six years. (Note: The Izvestia report of June 16 does not mention Popov.)

At this point, the influence of General Secretary Nikita Khrushchev began to be felt, and with it the accompanying politicisation of the case. During the trial, the KGB had arranged an exhibit featuring the group's holdings: a mountain of valuables, Tsarist gold coins, a mound of foreign banknotes, packets of Soviet money and bank deposit books. Khrushchev was invited and supposedly remarked: "They need to be shot for this". Although this was taken for yet another of his angry outbursts, he was serious this time.

=== Retrials and executions ===
The maximum penalty, in accordance with Soviet law, was eight years (under Article 88 of the Criminal Code of the RSFSR). Still, the procurator general of the USSR condemned the "leniency of the punishment" assigned to Rokotov and Faibishenko. Then, on 1 July, the Presidium of the USSR Supreme Soviet issued an edict providing the death penalty for violators of the laws regarding foreign currency operations. Another edict was issued secretly, applying this norm retroactively to the two men. Aleksei Adzhubei, Khrushchev's son-in-law and editor-in-chief of Izvestia, saw this as clearly illegal (as retroactive punishment was banned by Article 6 of the RSFSR Criminal Code) and tried to intercede on their behalf, but the General Secretary had made up his mind.

On 18–19 July, the case was retried by a panel of three judges at the Russian Republic Supreme Court. The trial was shown on television. The court established that Rokotov had bought and sold 12 million rubles' worth of currency and gold coins, while Faibishenko had bought and resold 1 million rubles' worth of currency. Izvestia noted that they had "led a parasitic type of life and enriched themselves through the benefits created by the working people". Accordingly, on 21 July, pursuant to Article 25 of the Law on State Crimes, they were sentenced to death by shooting and with confiscation of all their valuables and property. The sentence was heard "with approval" by those present.

Soon after, both men were shot. They were twenty-two years old. Khrushchev had spoken of a "return to Leninist norms of socialist legality", after years of abuse of the legal system by Joseph Stalin. This case made clear, however, that the rights of Soviet citizens did not extend to capitalist activities, such as profiteering and speculation.
