= François Le Fort (admiral) =

Genevan-born Russian admiral (1656–1699)

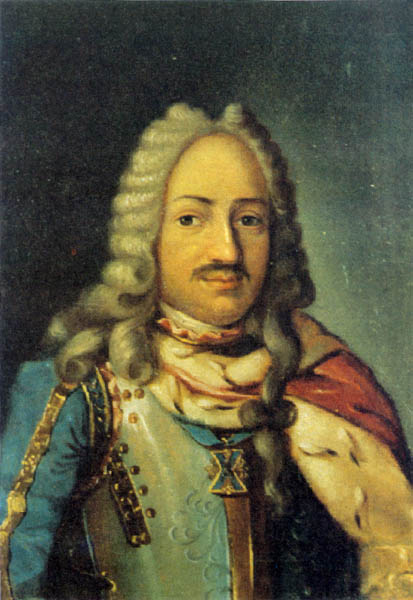
- Born: 12 January 1656; Geneva
- Died: 12 February 1699 (aged 43); Moscow, Russia
- Occupation: Politician

François Jacques Le Fort also spelled Lefort (Russian: Франц Яковлевич Лефорт, romanized: Frants Yakovlevich Lefort; 12 January [O.S. 2 January] 1656 – 12 March [O.S. 2 March] 1699) was a Genevan-born Russian military leader of Huguenot origin. He served as general admiral (1695) and was a close associate of Tsar Peter the Great.

== Military career ==
François Le Fort, born in Geneva, came from a merchant family. He began his military career in the Dutch army in 1674. In 1675 Le Fort arrived in Arkhangelsk in the company of the Prussian Colonel Jacob van Frosten, in order to find employment with the Russian army. In February 1676, he came to Moscow, but military officials turned him down. The Posolsky Prikaz (foreign ministry) listed him as a visiting foreigner. Le Fort settled in the so-called Nemetskaya sloboda in Moscow, where he would gain respect among other distinguished foreigners. In July 1678, he once again applied for service in the tsarist army. Accepted with the rank of captain, Le Fort then went to one of the fronts during the Russo-Turkish War of 1676–1681. In early 1679 he was ordered to join the Kiev garrison under the command of Prince Vasily Golitsyn and General Patrick Gordon. Upon his return to Moscow from a short trip to Geneva in 1683, Le Fort carried out various diplomatic assignments until the fall of 1685.

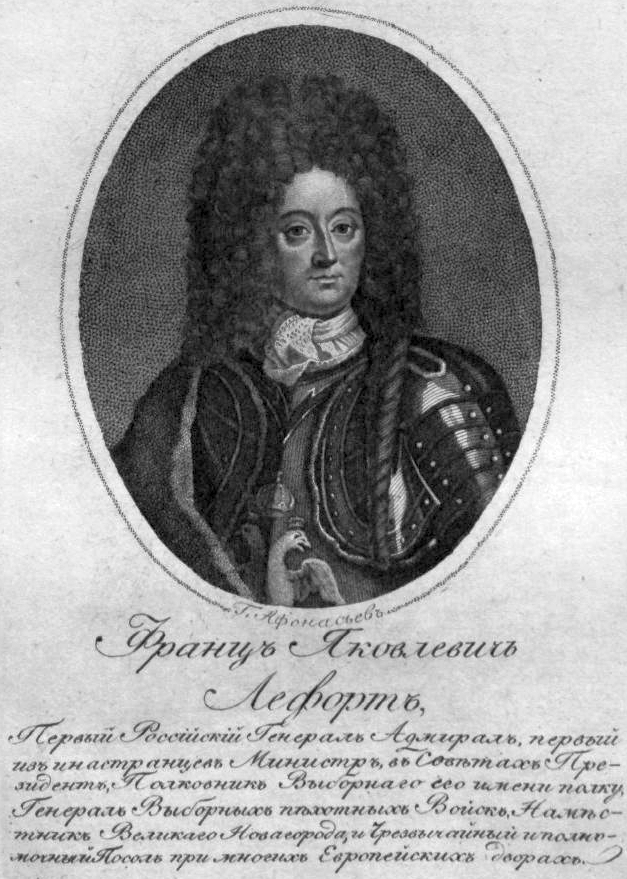
François Le Fort

In 1687 and 1689, he took part in two unsuccessful Crimean campaigns. Peter the Great became a frequent guest in Le Fort's house from 1690. Le Fort was one of the principal organizers and participators in Peter's military games, which would pave the way for his career advancement. In 1690 Le Fort was promoted to the rank of major general. He then became lieutenant general (1691) and general (1693). In 1692 Peter I funded the construction of a large reception hall for 1,500 people, which formed an extension to Le Fort's house. This hall hosted administrative meetings and Peter's parties. Le Fort's partying soon became infamous, with noble guests such as Peter I of Russia in usual attendance. They together would form one of the first mock religions, The All-Joking, All-Drunken Synod of Fools and Jesters, which earned notable criticism from both the Russian Orthodox Church, as well as the Roman Catholic Church for its routine mockery of their proceedings.

In 1691, Le Fort was put in charge of a regiment and assigned a training ground on the left bank of the Yauza River. Peter ordered the construction of a sloboda for this purpose, which would later be called Lefortovskaya sloboda (the Lefort quarter, present-day Lefortovo in Moscow's South-Eastern Administrative Okrug). In 1693–1694 Lefort accompanied Peter on his trip to Arkhangelsk. In 1694 he participated in Peter's "play" Kozhukhov campaign (a military game in the village of Kozhukhovo, between Moscow and Kolomenskoye).

During the Azov campaigns of 1695–1696 Le Fort was in charge of the Imperial Russian Navy. His return from the war was marked with a solemn parade through Moscow to his "native" Nemetskaya sloboda and subsequent festivities. Lefort was awarded a title of governor (наместник, or namestnik) of Novgorod and estates in two uyezds.

In 1696, Le Fort together with Fedor Golovin and Prokopy Voznitsyn took official charge of Peter's Grand Embassy, a Russian diplomatic mission to Western Europe. Upon his return to Moscow in 1698 he took part in the trial of the Streltsy rebels. That same year he moved to a custom-built palace, later known as the Lefortovsky Palace, on the Yauza River. The palace would soon become a center of Russian political and royal life in 1698–1699. Peter the Great used to hold all his important meetings and numerous celebrations in Le Fort's palace.

== Death ==
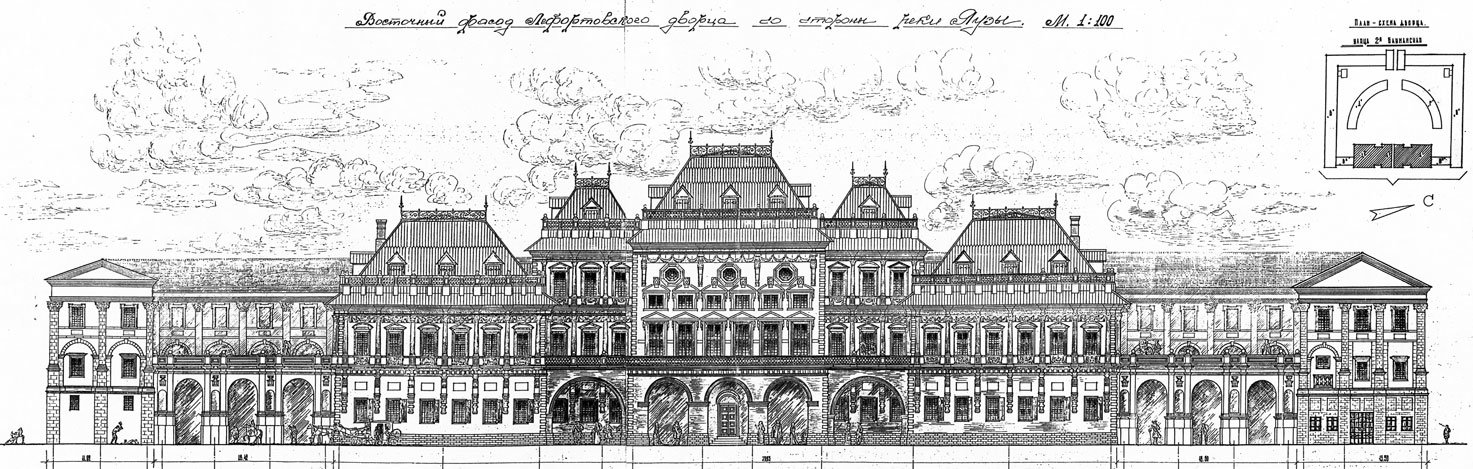
Lefortovo Palace on the Yauza River in Moscow

François Le Fort died in Moscow in early March 1699. Upon hearing the news of his death, Tsar Peter lamented "Now I am alone without one trusty man. He alone was faithful to me. Whom can I confide in now?" On 21 March, Peter held Lefort's state funeral, a ceremony second only to the funerals of tsars or patriarchs.

== Legacy ==
Le Fort lies buried in the Vvedenskoye Cemetery in Lefortovo.

The Russian 84-gun ship-of-the-line Lefort (launched 1835, shipwrecked 1857) was named in honor of Lefort, as was Lefortovo Prison and Lefortovo District.

== Gallery ==
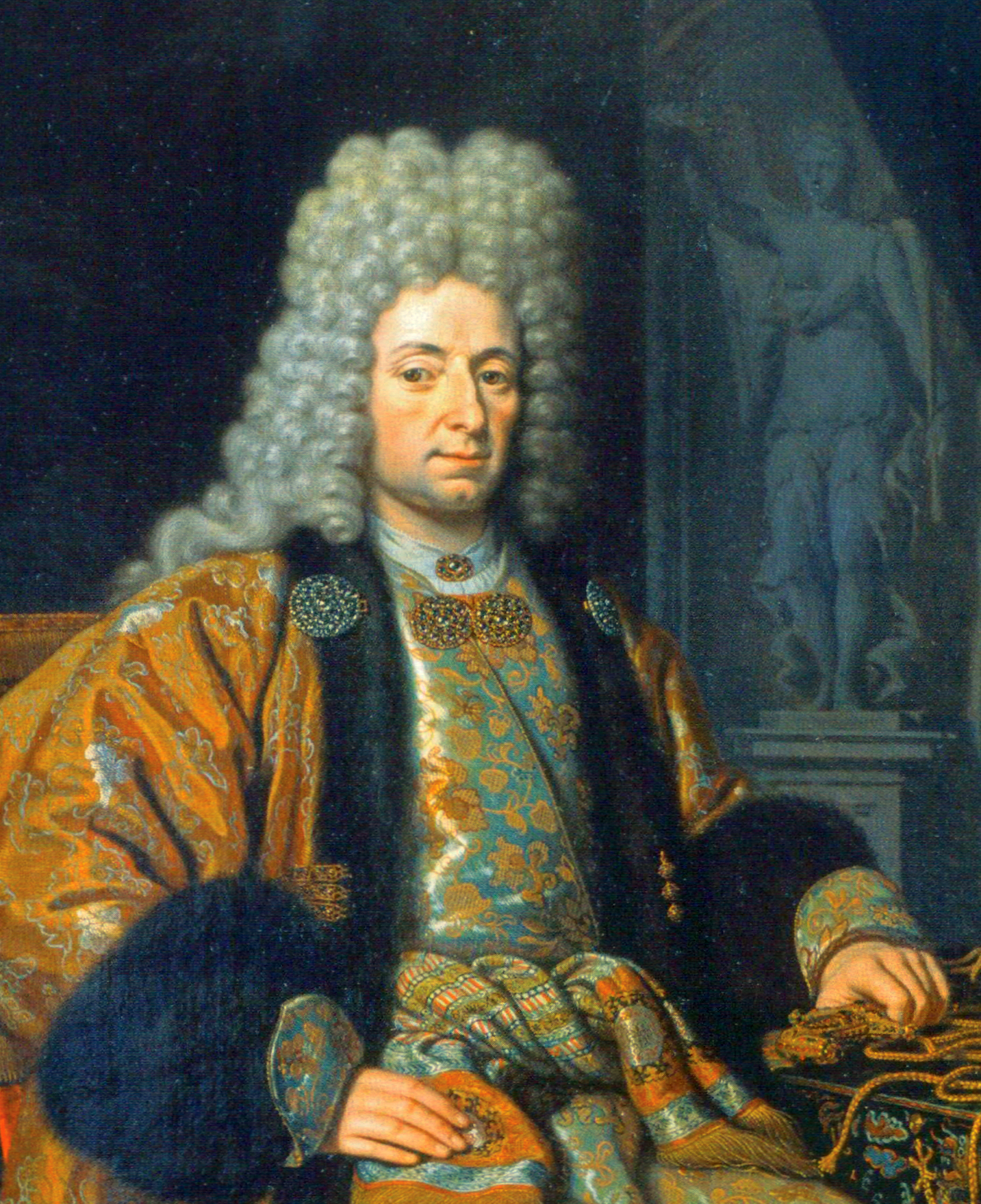
Portrait of F. Lefort (1698)

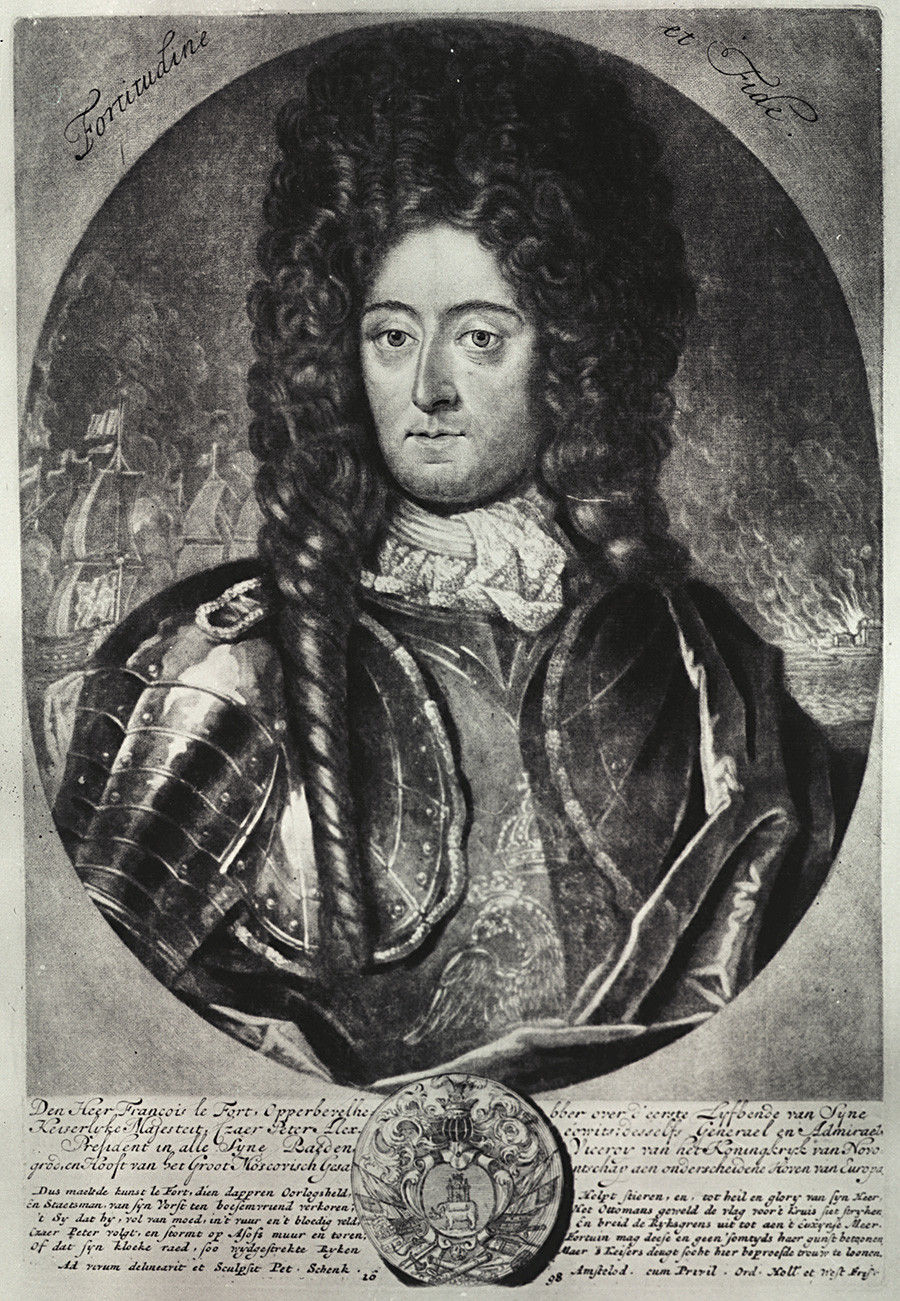
Engraving of F. Lefort (1698)

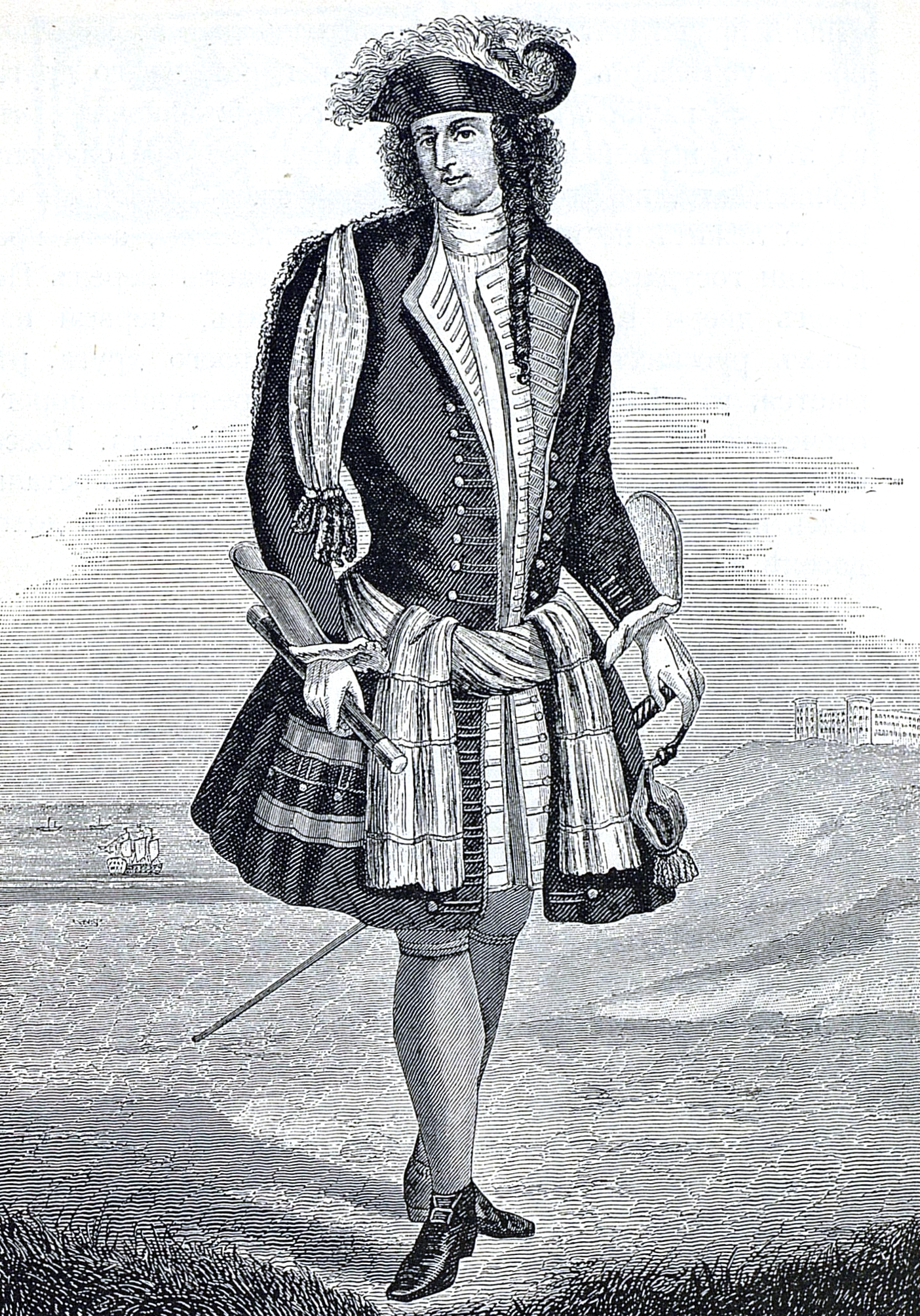
Dutch engraving of F. Lefort (1698)

== Sources ==
- "Лефорт, Франц Яковлевич" . Brockhaus and Efron Encyclopedic Dictionary (in Russian). 1906.
