= Grigori Grabovoi =

Russian pseudo-scientist and sect leader

Grigori Petrovich Grabovoi
- Григо́рий Петро́вич Грабово́й
- Born: November 14, 1963 (age 62); Shymkent, Kazakhstan
- Citizenship: Russia
- Education: Tashkent State Polytechnic University
- Known for: Breslan fraud scheme Grabovoi Numbers
- Criminal charges: fraud (2008)
- Criminal penalty: 11 years
- Criminal status: released (2010)
- Website: pr.grigori-grabovoi.world

Grigori Petrovich Grabovoi (Russian: Григо́рий Петро́вич Грабово́й, Czech: Grigorij Petrovič Grabovoj) (born November 14, 1963) is the founder and leader of the Russian sect Обучение всеобщему спасению и гармоничному развитию ('Teaching Universal Salvation and Harmonious Development'). He has claimed to be the second coming of Jesus Christ, to be able to resurrect the dead, teleport, cure AIDS and cancer at any stage, diagnose and solve problems of electronic devices remotely, to be clairvoyant and to be able to change reality.

In 2008, he was sentenced to 11 years in prison after promising to the mothers of victims of the 2004 Beslan school siege that he could resurrect their children. He was released early in 2010 and now lives in Serbia, from where he promotes his pseudoscientific project Universe Hacking Codes, which gained popularity due to the coronavirus epidemic, mostly through the social network TikTok.

== Biography ==
Grabovoi was born on November 14, 1963, in the village of Kirovo, in the Shymkent region of Kazakhstan, into a family with Ukrainian roots.

=== Meeting with Baba Vanga ===
According to Grabovoi, in October 1995 he met the Bulgarian "clairvoyant" Baba Vanga in the village of Rupite, Bulgaria, and Valentina Genkova, the editor of the Bulgarian national television service, acted as translator. According to Genkova, issues related to nuclear and ecological risks for the planet, the prolongation of human life, the possibility of not dying and the unification of religions were discussed at the meeting. Vanga expressed her opinion that "Grigori Petrovich, who has phenomenal qualities, must necessarily continue to work with people and expand the areas of application of his abilities. He should work in Russia, from where he will spread his knowledge and art to all countries of the world."

Lyudmila Kim (a traditional healer from Moscow) said in an interview with the Komsomolskaya Pravda newspaper on October 13, 2005, that she was present at a meeting between Grabovoi and Vanga. According to Kim, Vanga's views on Grabovoi's abilities were sharply critical, and Grabovoi was expelled from the meeting. On April 7, 2006, Komsomolskaya Pravda wrote about a meeting of a "young sesibila from Russia" in Bulgaria in 1995 in which Vanga imposed a test on Grabovoi, but she was dissatisfied with the self-proclaimed "healer" and literally kicked Grabovoi out, as many Bulgarian newspapers recounted. In July 2006, Latvian/Russian editor and journalist Andrei Levkin told Vzglyad newspaper that a documentary on the Central Television network showed the filming of the meeting of Vanga and Grabovoi, which ended in Vanga's emotional reaction and expulsion of Grabovoi.

Genkova protested against the illegal use on Russian television of her copyrighted material, the filming of a meeting between Vanga and Grabovoi. Genkova stated that the significance of Vanga's conversation with Grabovoi was distorted in the fragment of the filmed material which was used.

=== Russia ===
In 1995, Grabovoi moved to Russia where he was allegedly assisted by Georgy Rogozin, Deputy Chief of the Security Service of the President of the Russian Federation. In the same year Grabovoi registered non-profit organization Фонд Григория Грабового - внедрение и распространение Учения Григория Грабового "О спасении и гармоничном развитии" ('Grigory Grabovoi Foundation - implementation and dissemination of the Teachings of Grigory Grabovoi "On salvation and harmonious development"'), later known as the "DRUGG Foundation". Until 2006, it had regional branches in more than 50 regions of Russia.

In 1999, Grabovoi lectured at the Center for Education and Training of Specialists in Modern Technologies for the Prevention and Elimination of Emergencies of the Ministry of Emergency Situations - Emergency Monitoring and Prediction. The Ministry of Emergency Situations also confirmed that Grabovoi had contacted them in 2001 for further cooperation.

In 2000, he introduced the program "Grigori Grabovoi, The Formula of Health" to Russian television channel TV-6. In the same year, the newspaper "Variant Management - Forecast" was founded under the DRUGG Foundation. It ran for 10 issues and was terminated in 2005.

In 2001, E. P. Kruglyakov, from the Russian Academy of Sciences (RAS), published a report at the symposium "Science, Pseudoscience and Paranormal Phenomena", which also mentions the "crystal module" developed by Grabovoi. According to Grabovoi, this module, as Kruglyakov explains, halves the force of a nuclear explosion and can be used in nuclear power plants to protect against disasters.

In 2003, a report by the Presidium of the Russian Academy of Sciences on pseudoscience, Kruglyakov, sharply criticized Grabovoi's activities:

Accompanied by the first Russian president, Boris N. Yeltsin, a ... villain who calls himself a doctor of physical and mathematical sciences, G. Grabovoi, was observed. By the way, he claims that even today he mentally oversees the safety and functionality of the presidential plane before departure. He is also said to be the inventor of a unique device - the "crystal module", by which he significantly reduced the strength of a nuclear explosion during underground nuclear tests in the Semipalatin region. Although the absurdity of such a statement is quite obvious to every physicist, an investigation has been carried out, especially for laymen, which has shown that Mr Grabovoi has never taken part in any nuclear tests. G. Grabovoi is therefore lying. Officials should know this because he has made it clear that the crystal module will be useful in nuclear power plants.

— E.P. Kruglyakov, Pseudoscience - How does it threaten science and society?

In 2002, the Cinematography Fund of the Russian Ministry of Culture financed the film The Mission of Grigori Grabovoi. In the same year, Grabovoi served as vice president of the Russian Financial Union, a fund to support state programs.

In 2004, Grabovoi became a member of the Public Academy for Security, Defense and Law Enforcement. He was later expelled after questions were raised about his credentials.

== Grabovoi's teachings ==
Grabovoi claims the ability to abolish death, resurrect the dead, cure cancer and AIDS, teleport, and pinpoint and resolve at distance mechanical and electronic problems on airplanes, space stations, atomic electric power stations and any other technical constructions.

On June 5, 2004, Grabovoi held a press conference at which he declared himself to be the second coming of Jesus Christ:

I, Grigori Petrovich Grabovoi, born on November 14, 1963 in the village of Kirovskoye, formerly Bogara, Kirov District, Shymkent Region, Kazakhstan, declare that I, Grigori Grabovoi, am the second coming of Jesus Christ. I made this statement based on God's word. The word of God and the fact that I have always been personally sure of this means that I have always known it, from the beginning, from birth. And in this respect, this statement allows people to be saved, the universal action of salvation, ..., people can be saved by studying the knowledge I give - the knowledge of my teachings. At the same time, they can pass on this good news to everyone and at once.

Grabovoi's doctrine is called "On salvation and harmonious development" and the goal of this doctrine is "universal salvation and redemption for each person, ensuring the eternal creative harmonious development." Its primary aim is to "prevent a global catastrophe, and the opportunity to achieve solutions to personal tasks and general resurrection."

According to the conclusion of a comprehensive socio-psychological forensic examination carried out as part of criminal proceedings, Grabovoi's teachings were defined as follows:

Grigory Grabovoi's doctrine is a complex of special methods of influencing the human psyche and human behavior, and is aimed at people who experience acute mental distress due to the death of loved ones, patients with serious illness and stress, or increased mental vulnerability due to difficult life situations. .. The methods that make up this system of influence include: direct and indirect proposals; conversion (methodical purpose distortion) of normative linguistic concepts; methods that exploit and maintain a state of mental trauma and cause distortions of thought, perception, and understanding processes; methods of consciousness control - impact on the sphere of decision-making, the sphere of setting goals and personal motivations ...

Grabovoi describes his abilities in his three-part book The Practice of Adjustment. The Way of Salvation (Management practice. The Way to Salvation). He writes that the goal of his teaching is to pass on knowledge from God to mortals, thus providing both physical (immortality, resurrection of the dead) and spiritual benefits.

== Beslan school massacre and other investigations of Grabovoi's sect ==
Grabovoi met with the mothers of children killed during the siege of a school in Beslan, southern Russia, in 2004 and promised them that he would resurrect their children for a fee.

It is not clear whether Grabovoy is a madman or an unashamed charlatan, or both.

— Russian Life

On July 16, 2004, a photo of Grabovoi with the then-President of Kazakhstan, Nursultan Nazarbayev, appeared on Grabovoi's website along with a statement granting him permission to spread his teachings. In response, the Embassy of Kazakhstan stated that the documents supporting Grabovoi's teachings in the republic all had signs of forgery. After the affair with the mothers of Beslan, a correspondent for the daily newspaper Izvestia managed to meet Grabovoi, who at the time referred to himself as the second coming of Jesus Christ and announced that he would become Russian president in 2008. He tried to solve his problems with the press by offering a bribe of $25,000.

The issue of Izvestia following the meeting provoked an international scandal: Grabovoi forged Nazarbayev's signature on a document that showed that the president of Kazakhstan was a member of his sect and had chosen Grabovoi's teachings as state ideologies. The Moscow Public Prosecutor's Office subsequently launched an investigation into these facts. Journalists from NTV, the BBC, Radio Liberty, the Tribuna newspaper, the Regnum news agency and dozens of other media outlets in the regions of Russia and Kazakhstan subsequently joined the investigation into the activities of the Grabovoi sect.

In a March–April 2007 Susanna Dudieva, leader of Mothers of Beslan committee, told reporter Larisa Bochanov that Grabovoi had fallen victim to a smear campaign aimed at diverting attention from the authorities' poor handling of the Beslan hostage-taking. Dudieva named some journalists who she claimed spread false information, often the opposite information that she had reported to them. Among those named were Vladimir Vorsobin of Komsomolskaya Pravda, Dmitri Sokolov of Izvestia, and Alexey Pimanov of the TV show Man and Order. However Dudieva lost her job at the time because she joined Grabovoi's sect and promised resurrections.

According to Jelena Milashina from Novaya Gazeta, the authorities arrested Grabovoi on charges of fraud. Milashina wrote that the Ostankino department of the Prosecutor General of Russia threatened to sue the television show Man and Order for incitement of religious hatred. According to Milashina, Evgeny Saurov, who had filed charges against Grabovoi two years earlier, was prosecuted himself on an unrelated charge. Milashina claimed that Grabovoi was arrested on the orders of Vladimir Putin. Grabovoi sued the newspaper Komsomolskaya Pravda for 1.2 billion rubles but lost in the Savelovsky Court in Moscow.

=== Court and prison ===
On 7 July 2008, the Tagansky Court in Moscow found Grabovoi guilty of 11 counts of large-scale fraud and sentenced him to 11 years of imprisonment. According to the court sentence, Grabovoi organized a pyramid scheme, franchising his "followers" to practice within the cult provided that they remit 10% of receipts to Grabovoi. The court considered the money received from the relatives of deceased people (an average of 40 thousand Russian roubles for resurrection of the dead) as proceeds derived from fraud. Relatives saw neither the resurrected dead nor the money. In October 2008, Grabovoi's sentence at the new trial was reduced to 8 years and a fine of 750 thousand rubles. He started serving his sentence at Valdajin prison in the Novgorod region and in January 2009 he was transferred to a prison in Berezniki. In May 2010, Grabovoi was released early for good behavior. The regional prosecutor's office appealed against Grabovoi's early release in May 2010. Russian lawyers, including Mikhail Trepashkin, have sued Vladimir Putin and President Dmitry Medvedev for ordering Grabovoi's prosecution.

On the eve of Grabovoi's release, his wife Jelena Yegereva said her husband had been wrongly called the sect's creator, while he was the organizer of the DRUGG political party (now interpreted as the Volunteer Party, which spreads the teachings of Grabovoi). "It's not a sect, it's a political party registered with the Ministry of Justice," Jeregeva said. However, the Ministry of Justice of the Russian Federation stated that no DRUGG party was registered with them. In 2006, the Ministry of Justice refused to register it. Grabovoi's lawyer, Vyacheslav Makarov, said that it existed and that it was registered only as a social and religious organization with the same name - DRUGG. After Grabovoi's release, his wife Yegereva said that he would no longer participate in public activities, would pursue legal education, and intended to raise his children and wait for grandchildren.

On 22 September 2016, the European Court of Human Rights ruled on financial compensation of €2,500 for Grabovoi for an unreasonably long pre-trial detention period (more than two years).

== Other endeavours ==
=== Alternative healer ===
When in Russia, he was a practitioner of alternative medicine.

=== Grigori Grabovoi PR Consulting Technologies of Eternal Development ===
Olga Saburova, a journalist for the newspaper Sobesednik, reported that since January 2020, Grabovoi has been the owner of the online store "Grigori Grabovoi PR Consulting Technologies of Eternal Development", which "acts on the basis of Grigori Grabovoi's individual state registration certificate 21 September 2015 by the Business Registration Agency of the Republic of Serbia". He notes that he is currently selling PRK-1U - "concentration-building devices" that are claimed to be able to stop aging and start rejuvenation, and treat HIV and cancer. Saburova notes that the price is €9,700 (with delivery) or €1,212 (in the case of remote access) "(prices valid in May 2021), and also suggests that "for those who do not know how and where to use the equipment, the 'healer' is ready to explain the principle of the magical mechanism within the webinars, for a fee...".

=== Grabovoi numbers ===
Olga Saburova also drew attention to Grabovoi's Facebook page where he is once again promoting his ideas of "treating any disease", including COVID-19 based on ideas from his 1999 book "Restoring the Human Body by Focusing on Numbers", in which he states that "every disease of an individual is a deviation from the normal cells, organs or the whole organism as a whole. The treatment of the disease then means a return to the norm", which can be achieved with the help of two numerical series invented by him - 4986489 and 548748978.

In addition, journalists from the TV show Man and Law reported that Grabovoi used the social network TikTok to support these ideas. These and other "miracle codes" have been appearing since 2016 on Pinterest; books on codes could be purchased on Amazon as early as 2011 and in February 2020 the tabloid Daily Star mentions Hong Kong actor Julian Cheung, who wrote such a number on his forearm and called it a "code for epidemic prevention". Cheung's fans then began to imitate him, and the practice began to spread quickly through the Weibo social network.

These "codes" began to spread on other social networks using the hashtags #LawOfAttraction and #Manifestation. People often share these "codes" as "cheat codes", i.e. as an opportunity to hack reality, so-called "manifest" their wishes and easily gain wealth, health, or anything else. Rows of numbers are said to be recited, focused on during meditation, written on the body (the inner wrists and arms are popular), or drawn in the air. There is no clear guide on how to use them or how long to use them and therefore, they cannot actually be used incorrectly. Russian bloggers are said to share numbers that are believed to have the power to negatively affect reality, i.e. to cause, for example, migraines, cardiac arrest, high fevers, or poisoning.

According to clinical psychiatrist Andrej Efremov, many bloggers and YouTubers make posts about these numbers mainly to get more views on their channel or blog. Similarly used on TikTok, such contributions generate monetary gains.

People who believe that these codes work usually uncritically accept what they are told. They see someone's positive example, they see a lot of positive comments, and they blindly follow the instructions. In addition, such people themselves will look for situations that will prove that the ritual works, and will attribute all positive events to the codes. This is how autosuggestion works. Grabovoi's followers themselves - probably also fraudsters - will look for such people on TikTok and make money from them, while the others will lose their savings and perhaps even their homes.

— Andrej Efremov

== Unverified claims regarding qualifications and memberships ==
According to the images of certificates and diplomas on Grabovoi's personal website in 1986 he allegedly qualified as a mechanic and in 1996 as a paramedic. In 1998 he claims he was appointed a full member of the Russian Academy of Natural Sciences in the "Noospheric knowledge and technologies" section and, in the same year, worked as a consultant to the United Nations Economic and Social Council, was appointed an honoured member of the Russian Academy of Astronautics, received the Memorial Medal of the International Academy of Sciences of Nature and Society for "services in the cause of the revival of Russia's science and economy", received a silver medal from the International Academy of Authors of Scientific Discoveries and Inventions for "services in inventiveness", was appointed a squire of the Sovereign Order of Saint John of Jerusalem and Knights of Malta, was granted the title Doctor of the Russian Academy of Natural Sciences in the specialty "Noospheric knowledge and technologies", was awarded the memorial medal of the International Academy of Sciences of Nature and Society for "Development of Culture and Arts", was granted the title "International Competition Laureate - Elite Informationaologists of the World", and was presented with the title "Count" by the Russian society of nobility and gentry - New elite of Russia.

On the same day 1999 he allegedly obtained the titles "Grand Doctor of Philosophy" and "Full Professor" from the "World Distributed University, Bruxelles". Also in 1999 he claims to have received the "Diploma of Professor" for "Safety of objects of extreme complexity" from the Russian federation, a Doctor of Engineering Sciences diploma from the Russian federation, the "Star of Verdansky" (2nd degree) from the International Inter-academic Union for "Supporting the sciences and promoting training of scientific personnel", a Diploma of Doctor of Physico-Mathematical Sciences from the Russian Federation, the Doctor of Information Science and Management from the International Academy for Integration of Science and Business, a professorship in "analytical and structural-analytical instruments and systems" from the Russian federation, a professorship of "system information science" from the International Academy for Integration of Science and Business, and a Doctor of Science in "technical services" from the European University, Russia.

He also claims to be a member of the Italian Academy of Economic and Social Development, The New York Academy of Sciences, the Russian Academy of Natural Sciences, the Russian Professional Psychotherapeutic League, and The Russian Academy of Medical Technical Sciences.

According to E. P. Kruglyakov, from the Russian Academy of Sciences (RAS), Grabovoi did not defend his dissertation but still claims to be a doctor of technical sciences, physics and mathematics. Kruglyakov further states that the diploma of the Italian Academy of Sciences is made with spelling errors and is fake. The RAS Commission for Combating Pseudoscience requested information on Grabovoi from academies in Belgium, Bulgaria and Italy (in connection with Grabovoi's claim that he was a member of the academies of these countries) and received official replies that nothing was known about Grabovoi in these academies. He was a probationary member of the Russian Professional Psychotherapeutic League for 4 years, but was deprived of membership due to non-payment of membership fees.

According to the daily newspaper Versiya, the "Higher Interacademic Attestation and Qualification Commission", from which Grabovoi has several diplomas, publishes titles for a fee to anyone and the scientific community does not recognize these titles and the only real diploma on Grabovoi's website is the graduation from the Faculty of Mechanics and Mathematics of Tashkent State University. As Kruglyakov emphasizes: "All other important titles and titles of doctor of science, professor, great professor, academic of many public academies can be freely purchased for a not too high fee ($100-150)."
