= DOT-117 tank car =

Type of liquid/gas tank car used in railway transport

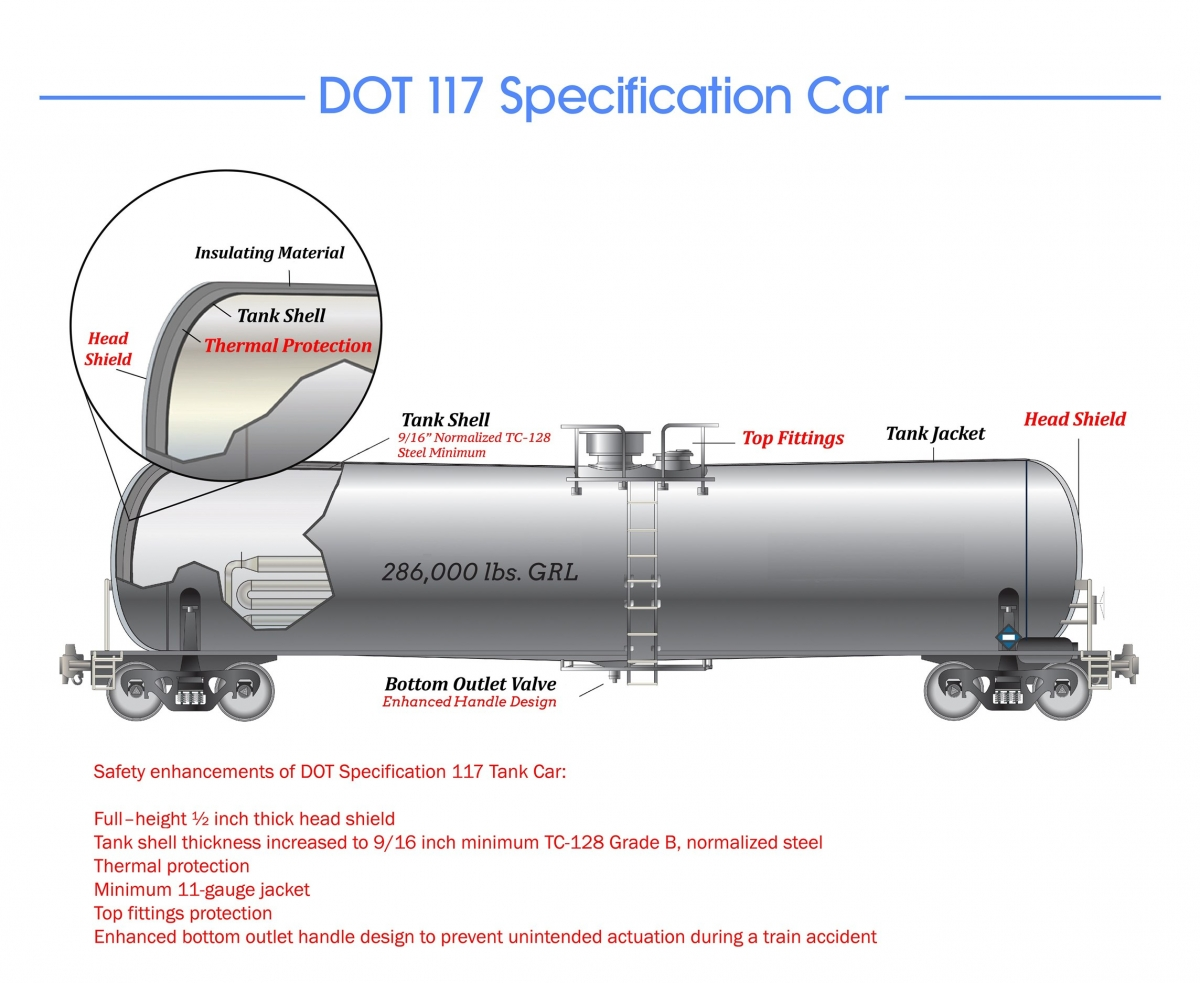
Diagram showing construction of the DOT 117 tank car.

The DOT-117 (TC-117 in Canada) is a type of unpressurized tank car in use on North American railroads. The DOT-117 design was developed in the aftermath of the Lac-Mégantic rail disaster of 2013 in an effort to upgrade the specifications of the then-common DOT-111 and CPC-1232 designs. It was announced on May 1, 2015 by the United States Federal Railroad Administration (FRA) and Canada's Transport Canada (TC). The specifications require that the tank shells be constructed out of 9/16 in (14.2875 mm) steel, with 11-gauge (1/8 in or 3.175 mm) sheet metal jackets, 1/2 in (12.7 mm) thick head shields on the ends of the tanks, and improved valves over previous designs.

In order to implement the DOT-117 standard, the FRA and TC required that all new tank cars constructed after October 1, 2015 be built to the specification. The agencies also imposed a retrofit schedule to bring in-service cars up to DOT-117 standards. Depending on the volatility of the cargo carried, DOT-111 and CPC-1232 cars would be banned in certain services in a series of cut-off dates, with all such cars out of service or rebuilt by May 1, 2025.

== See also ==
- Title 49 of the Code of Federal Regulations
