= Colette Roy-Laroche =

Canadian politician

Mayor of Lac-Mégantic, Quebec, Canada
- In office 2002–2015
- Preceded by: Jean Campeau
- Succeeded by: Jean-Guy Cloutier

Personal details
- Born: Colette Roy; August 2, 1943 (age 82) Sainte-Cécile-de-Whitton, Quebec, Canada
- Spouse: Yvan Laroche
- Occupation: teacher

Colette Roy-Laroche (born August 2, 1943) is a former Canadian politician who served as mayor of Lac-Mégantic, Quebec from 2002 to 2015. She is best known for her handling of the 2013 Lac-Mégantic rail disaster, which earned her the affectionate nickname "The Granite Lady" for her unflappable strength.

Born and raised in the nearby town of Sainte-Cécile-de-Whitton, she moved to Lac-Mégantic at age 17. After a brief marriage to a husband who died of cancer at a young age, she remarried in her 20s to Yvan Laroche, an officer with the Sûreté du Québec. A teacher by career, she rose to become director of the town's school board before being elected mayor in 2002.

Earlier in 2013, Roy-Laroche had announced that she would not run for another term in the 2013 municipal elections. Following the rail disaster, however, the incumbent council's term in office was extended two years so that the town would not have to cope with an election in the middle of the tragedy and its aftermath.

She earned the "Granite Lady" designation in part for her adamant refusal to permit the railway line on which the accident occurred to be rebuilt on its existing path through the downtown core. At least one observer, a Haitian immigrant living in Montreal, praised her as having been more visible and active throughout the crisis than René Préval had been following the 2010 Haiti earthquake. By August 14, just over one month after the accident, the town had preliminary plans in place to rebuild the destroyed downtown.

Roy-Laroche downplayed the praise, telling the media "I am just doing what any mayor would do when faced with disaster. I'm the mayor of a little city of 6,000 people that has to deal with what they're calling the biggest train accident in Canadian history. I was head of the school board, I had to deal with angry parents. That was nothing. I am in great health, I have a lot of energy. My advice is, keep your health, stay in harmony with your family."

In December, when the provincial government of Quebec organized a special ceremony to present the first responders in the disaster with a medal of honour for their service and bravery, Roy-Laroche herself was also named as an honoree.

Through 2014 and 2015, Roy-Laroche took on a public role as an advocate for improved rail safety. In March 2014, she travelled to Washington, D.C., as part of a delegation lobbying the United States Congress to improve American rail safety regulations. Later in 2014, she spoke more openly to the media about the disaster's impact on her; the deceased had included two of her cousins, and had she been able to babysit her grandchildren on the night of the derailment, her son would have been at the Musi-Café as well.

As the special election approached in 2015, Roy-Laroche announced that she would not run for another term as mayor, reconfirming her original announcement of her intention to retire in 2013. Following the special election in November, she was succeeded as mayor by Jean-Guy Cloutier.
