= DOT-111 tank car =

North American tank car for rail transport

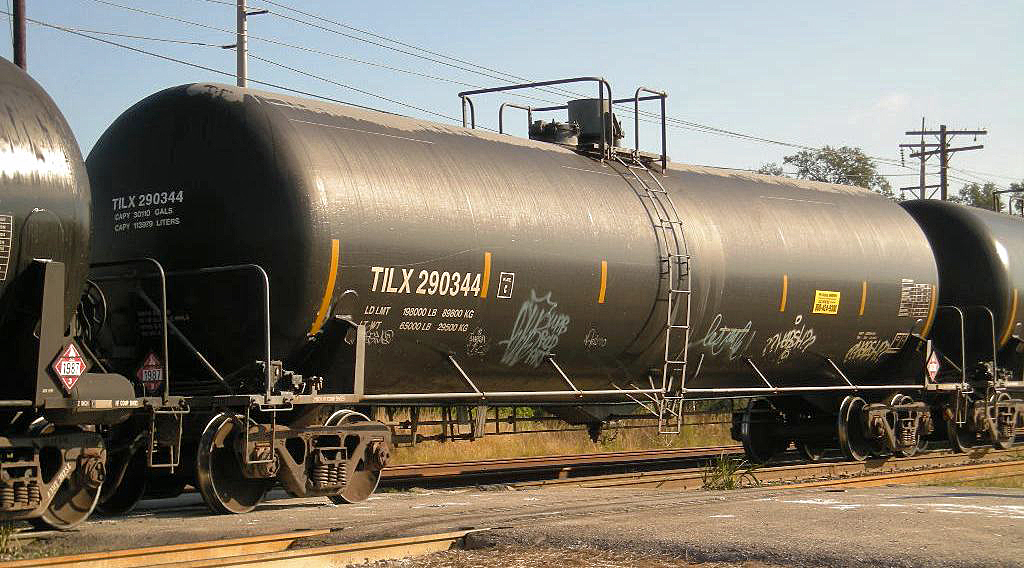
A DOT-111 tank car, specification 111A100W1, constructed by fusion welding carbon steel. This car has a capacity of 30,110 US gallons (113,979 L; 25,071.8 imp gal), a test pressure of 100 psi (690 kPa), a tare weight of 65,000 pounds (29,500 kg) and a load limit of 198,000 pounds (89,800 kg).

In rail transport, the U.S. DOT-111 tank car, also known as the TC-111 in Canada, is a type of unpressurized general service tank car in common use in North America. Tank cars built to this specification must be circular in cross section, with elliptical, formed heads set convex outward. They have a minimum plate thickness of 7/16 inch (11.1 mm) and a maximum capacity of 34,500 US gallons (131,000 L; 28,700 imp gal). Tanks may be constructed from carbon steel, aluminum alloy, high alloy steel, or nickel plate steel by fusion welding.

== Usage ==
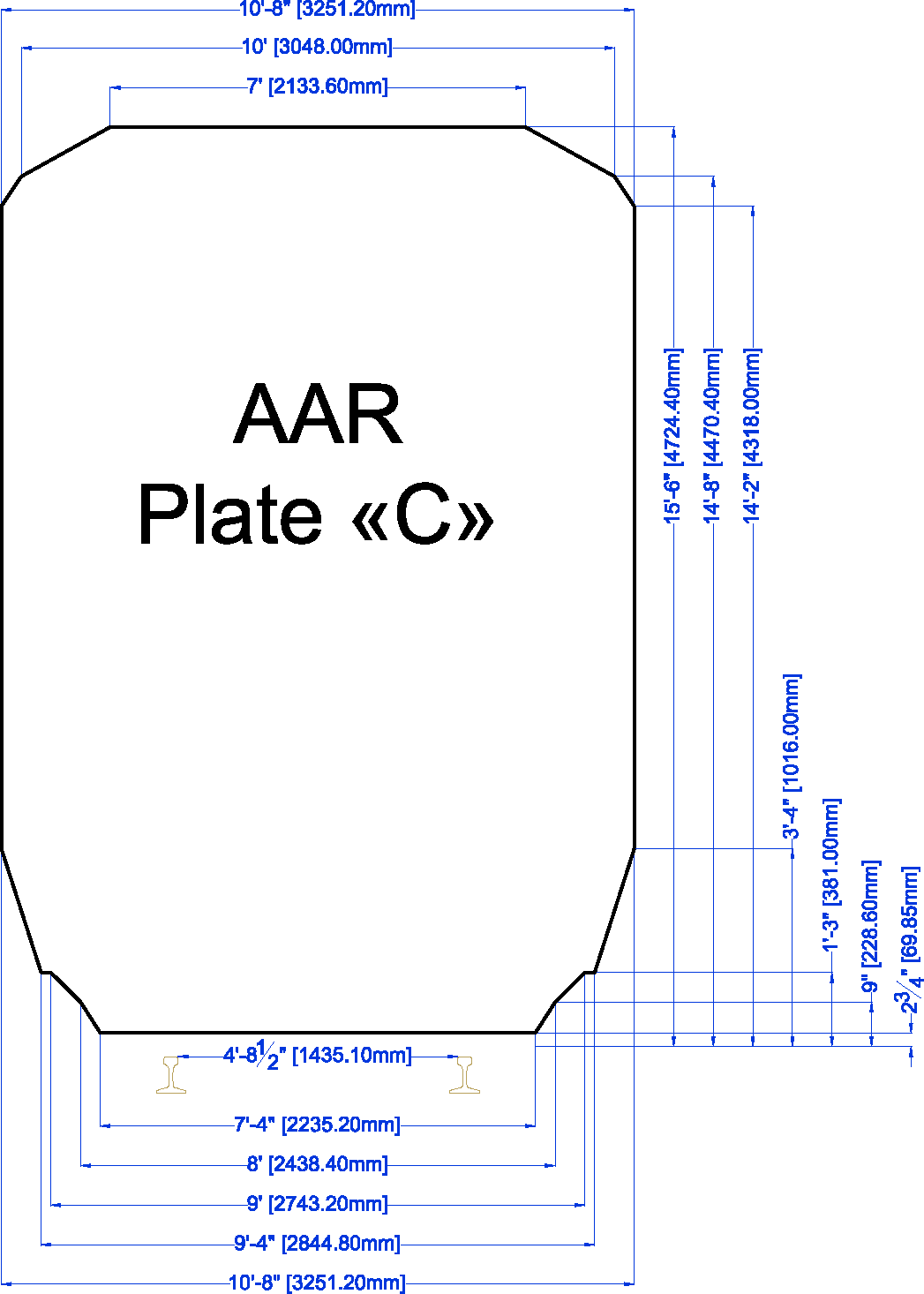
AAR Plate-C loading gauge.

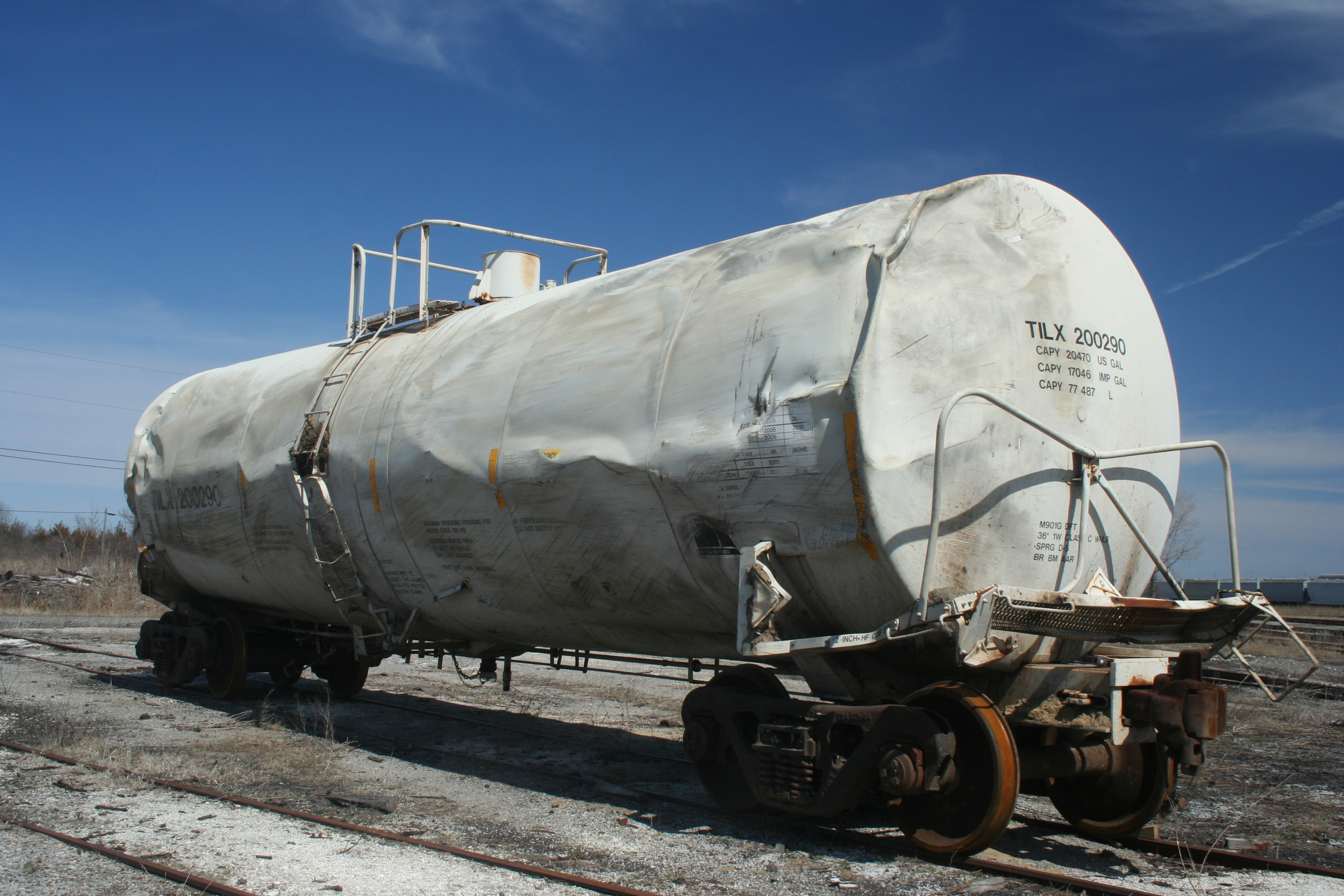
A damaged DOT-111A tank car. Note the AAR Type E double shelf coupler required for transporting dangerous goods.

Up to 80% of the Canadian fleet and 69% of U.S. rail tank cars were DOT-111 type, as of 2013.

DOT-111 cars are equipped with AAR Type E top and bottom shelf Janney couplers designed to maintain vertical alignment to prevent couplers from overriding and puncturing the tank end frames in the event of an accident. These tank cars transport various types of liquid dangerous goods, including 40,000 cars in dedicated service carrying 219,000 car loads of ethanol fuel annually in the U.S.

Hydraulic fracturing of new wells in the shale oil fields in the interior of North America has rapidly increased use of DOT-111 cars to transport crude oil to existing refineries along the coasts.

The Montreal, Maine and Atlantic Railway runaway train in the Lac-Mégantic derailment of July 2013 was made up of 72 of these cars, 63 of which derailed. Almost all of these derailed tank cars were damaged, and many had large breaches. About six million litres (1,600,000 US gal; 1,300,000 imp gal) of light crude oil originating from the Bakken formation was quickly released and caught fire. The ensuing blaze and explosions left 47 people dead.

A November 2013 derailment near Aliceville, in Pickens County, Alabama involved a similar explosion of North Dakota crude oil. The Genesee & Wyoming company was the carrier for this 90-car train, of which 20 derailed and exploded. The train originated in Amory, Mississippi and was scheduled for a pipeline terminal in Walnut Hill, Florida that is owned by Genesis Energy. The final destination for the shipment was to have been the Shell Oil refinery in Mobile, Alabama. The accident happened in a depopulated wetlands area. Three cars experienced a boiling liquid expanding vapor explosion.

On 30 December 2013, a similar explosion occurred in Casselton, North Dakota causing the town to be evacuated. The BNSF train was 106 cars and 1.6 km long, of which at least 10 cars were destroyed. Reports were that another train carrying grain and running to the opposite direction derailed first, causing the adjacent train with tank cars carrying oil from the Bakken formation to derail one minute later. Three days later, the US DOT PHMSA wrote that "Recent derailments and resulting fires indicate that the type of crude oil being transported from the Bakken region may be more flammable than traditional heavy crude oil... Based on preliminary inspections conducted after recent derailments in North Dakota, Alabama and Lac-Megantic, Quebec, involving Bakken crude oil [we mandate crude producers and shippers to] sufficiently degasify hazardous materials prior to and during transportation."

The oil regulator for North Dakota stated in early December 2013 that he expected as much as 90 per cent of that state's oil would be carried by train in 2014, up from the current 60 per cent. The number of crude oil carloads hauled by U.S. railroads surged from 10,840 in 2009 to a projected 400,000 in 2013. In the third quarter of 2013, crude-by-rail shipments rose 44 percent from the previous year to 93,312 carloads, equivalent to about 740,000 barrels per day or almost one tenth of U.S. production. That was down 14 percent from the second quarter of 2013 due to narrower oil spreads that made costlier rail shipments less economic.

On 7 January 2014, 17 cars of a 122-car train derailed and exploded near Plaster Rock, New Brunswick. Nobody was injured but about 150 people were evacuated. The petroleum products originated in Western Canada and were destined for the Irving Oil Refinery in St. John.

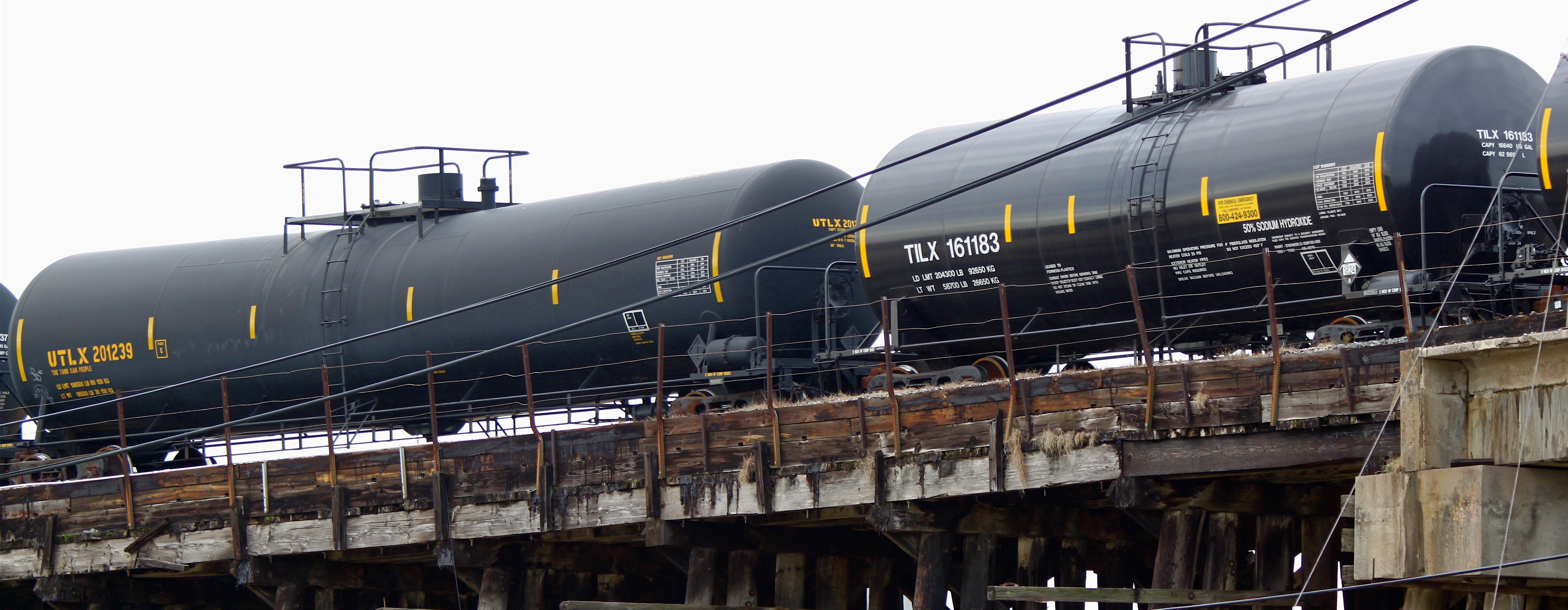
Two different 111A100W1 specification tank cars, both with 263,000-pound (119,000 kg) gross rail load. On the left is a 27,399-US-gallon (103,716 L; 22,814.4 imp gal) capacity tank car with a load limit of 196,500 pounds (89,100 kg), making it suitable for low specific gravity liquids. On the right, a lighter, smaller 16,640-US-gallon (62,989 L; 13,856 imp gal) capacity tank car has a higher load limit of 204,300 pounds (92,700 kg). It is stenciled and placarded for 50% sodium hydroxide aqueous solution, which has a specific gravity of 1.5. This car is also equipped with an insulating jacket and external heating pipes to melt frozen contents if necessary.

== Construction ==
The DOT-111 tank cars are constructed with a draft sill design. Draft sills incorporate the draft gear behind each coupler that is designed to transfer longitudinal draft (tension) and buff (compression) forces throughout the length of a train. The draft sills are attached to steel pads that are attached to the tank. If the cars do not incorporate a continuous center sill extending the entire length of the car, the two draft sills at each end are referred to as stub sills, and the tank carries draft forces between couplers. In this case, reinforcing bars may be extended underneath the tank between the draft sills. Body bolsters and their associated body bolster pads centered above the railcar trucks support the tank and protect it against lateral forces. The draft sill center plate serves as the attachment point between the tank car body and the truck assembly. (See schematic cutaway at right.)

The body bolster pads and front sill pads are attached to the tank with fillet welds. At the rear edge of the front sill pad, a butt weld attaches the front sill pad to the body bolster pad and to the fillet weld attaching the body bolster pad to the tank shell. Fillet welds at the interior and exterior sides of the head brace attach the head brace to the front sill pad, and an exterior fillet weld attaches the head brace to the draft sill. To the rear of the head brace, the draft sill is welded to the front sill pad, body bolster pad, and reinforcing bars.

Because rail cars have no front or rear, for descriptive purposes, the ends of the cars are designated "A" and "B." The B end of the car is the end equipped with the wheel or lever used to manually set the car's hand brakes. The end without the hand brake is the A end. As trains are assembled, either end of a tank car may be placed in the front or rear position. The tank shells are constructed of several rings welded together, with six rings in a typical configuration. By convention, ring-1 is at the A end, and if there are six rings, ring-6 is at the B end. The tank rings can be welded in a "straight barrel" configuration, or with a "slope bottom" sloping down to a bottom outlet valve at the center of the tank.">

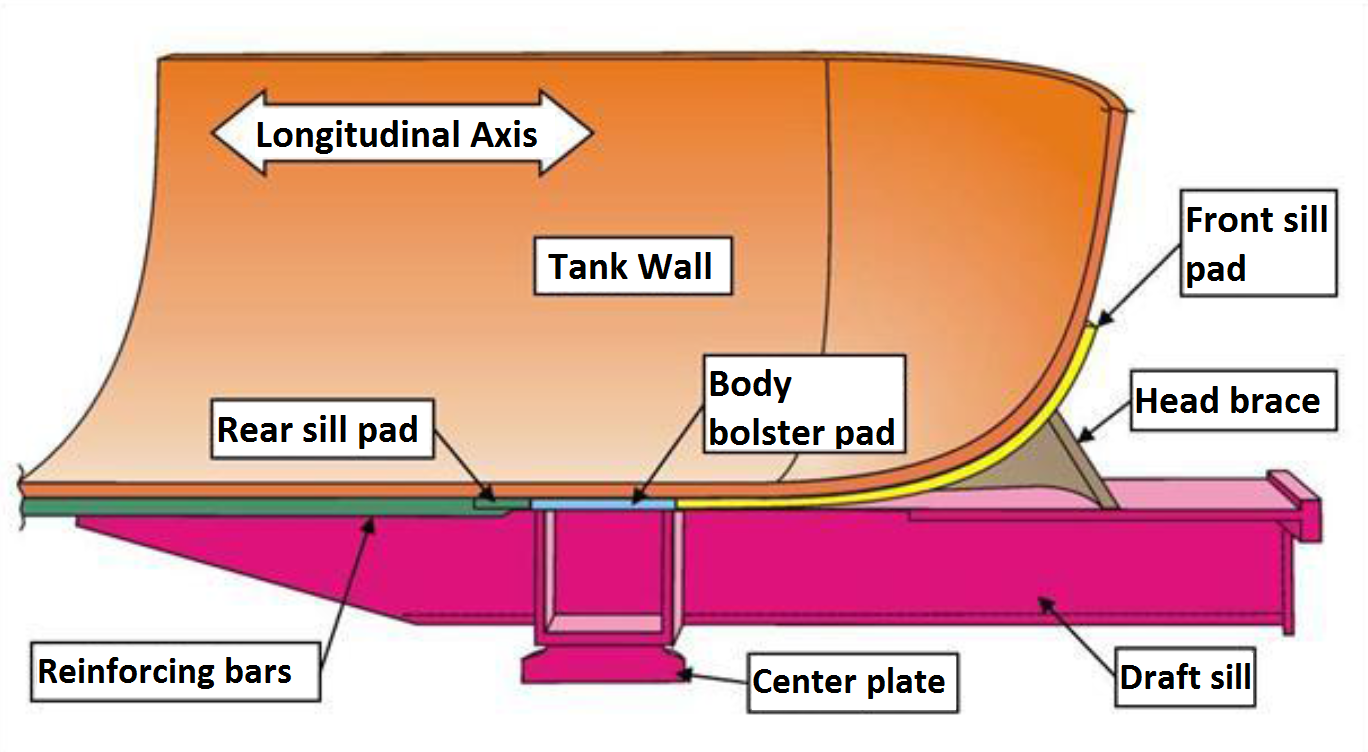
Schematic cutaway view (not to scale) of end of tank car showing major components.

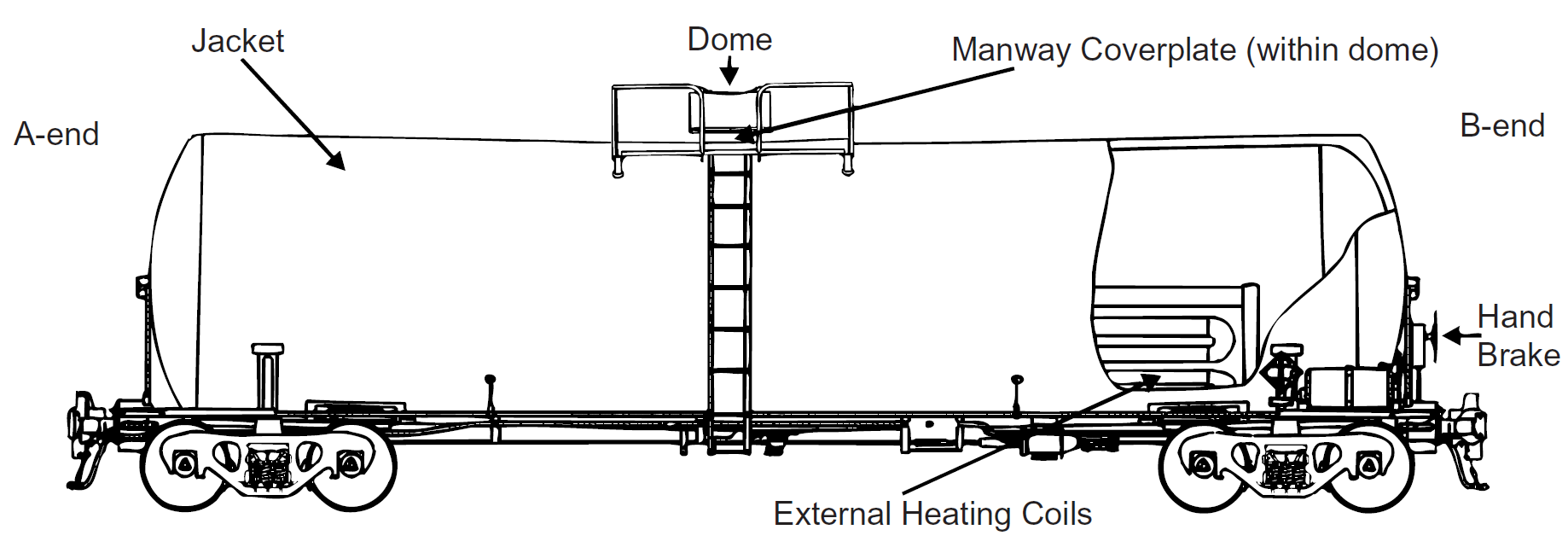
Diagram of a DOT-111J100W1 tank car with an insulating jacket and external heating coils. It has a capacity of 20,000 US gallons (76,000 L; 17,000 imp gal).

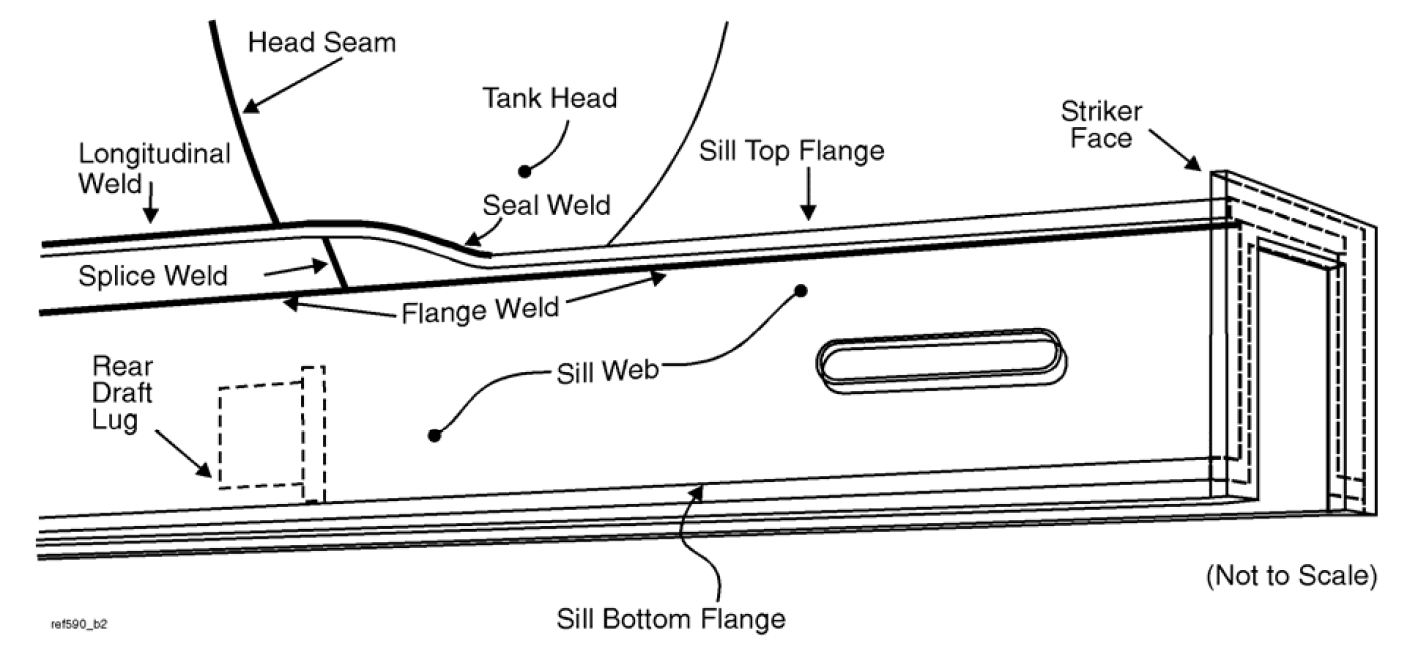
Draft sill structural and weld details

== Regulations ==
A 2013 Senate of Canada committee report proposed mandatory minimum insurance for rail companies and recommended the creation of an online database with information on spills and other incidents from rail cars. Currently the railway industry lags the pipeline industry in value of mandatory insurance coverage, to a ratio of 1:40.

Railway operators are not required to inform Canadian municipalities about dangerous goods in transit.

DOT-112 tank cars and DOT-114 tank cars have been required since 1979 under Regulation SOR/79-101 of the Canada Transportation Act for the transportation of gases such as propane, butane, or vinyl chloride. Transportation Safety Board of Canada Railway Investigation Report R94T0029 section 1.13.1 documents DOT-112 tank car and DOT-114 tank car standards: the DOT-111 tank "cars are not considered to provide the same degree of derailment protection against loss of product as the classification 112 and 114 cars, designed to carry flammable gases."

== Accident investigations ==
A report on "The State of Rail Safety in Canada" was commissioned by Transport Canada in 2007. The report contains a 10-year statistical examination of its subject. Section 6 is entitled "Accidents involving dangerous goods". A formal review of the Railway Safety Act was empanelled by the Minister in February 2007. The review, which was tabled in Parliament later that year, has a different take on the subject.

=== Completed ===
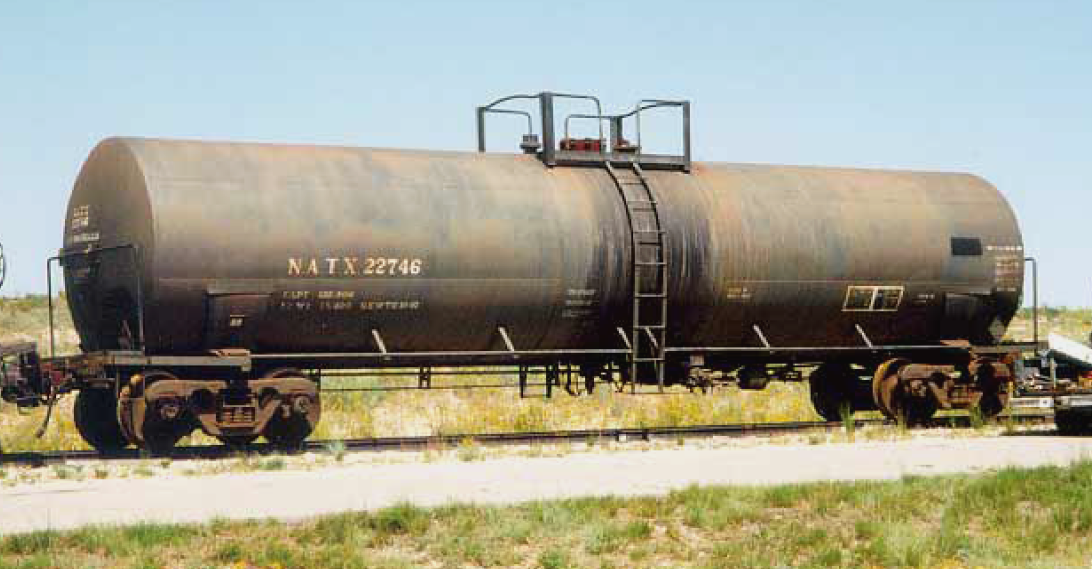
An older DOT-111 tank car manufactured in 1967 shown as it appeared in 1996. This car was equipped with an insulating jacket and had a capacity of 20,670 US gallons (78,200 L; 17,210 imp gal).

During a number of accident investigations over a period of years, the U.S. National Transportation Safety Board has noted that DOT-111 tank cars have a high incidence of tank failures during accidents. Previous NTSB investigations that identified the poor performance of DOT-111 tank cars in collisions include a May 1991 safety study as well as NTSB investigations of a June 30, 1992, derailment in Superior, Wisconsin; a February 9, 2003, derailment in Tamaroa, Illinois; and an October 20, 2006, derailment of an ethanol unit train in New Brighton, Pennsylvania. In addition, on February 6, 2011, the Federal Railroad Administration (FRA) investigated the derailment of a unit train of DOT-111 tank cars loaded with ethanol in Arcadia, Ohio, which released about 786,000 US gallons (2,980,000 L; 654,000 imp gal) of product. The Transportation Safety Board of Canada also noted that this car's design was flawed resulting in a "high incidence of tank integrity failure" during accidents.

The Transportation Safety Board of Canada (TSBC) investigated a derailment incident near Westree, Ontario which occurred on 30 January 1994. They cited report NTSB/SS-91/01 which questioned "the safety of DOT-111A tank cars and determined that this classification of tank car has a high incidence of tank integrity failure when involved in accidents and that certain hazardous materials are transported in these tank cars even though better protected cars (less liable to release the transported product when involved in accidents) are available." The TSBC instituted "Amendment Schedule No. 21 to the Transportation of Dangerous Goods Regulations", which mandated "the use of revised tank car standard CAN/CGSB 43.147-94. This standard restricts the use of 111A tank cars, and removes over 80 dangerous goods previously authorized for transportation in Class 111 cars." The updated standard is available through the Canadian General Standards Board.

Approximately 230,000 litres (61,000 US gallons; 51,000 imperial gallons) of sulphuric acid was released, causing environmental damage, on 21 January 1995 near Gouin, Quebec. The 11 rail cars that released product were standard series CTC-111A tank cars. The derailment was caused by gauge loss, and the number of defective ties north of the derailment area likely exceeded Canadian National's (CN) maintenance standard. Transport Canada determined that a retrofit of the top fittings of all Class 111A cars would exceed one billion dollars.

The Transportation Safety Board of Canada (TSBC) investigated an occurrence near River Glade, New Brunswick which occurred on 11 March 1996. The 1996 report concluded that "Class 111A tank cars are more susceptible to release product upon derailment and impact than pressure tank cars, and yet there are a number of toxic and volatile liquids that are still permitted to be carried in minimum standard Class 111A tank cars." The report makes no recommendation to upgrade or limit the use of Class 111A tank cars.

An investigative report published 3 August 2013 by the Brandon Sun listed 10 railway derailments in the area over the past decade. Derailments caused no injuries over that period.

On 2 May 2002, a train collided with a transport truck at the Firdale, Manitoba CN crossing. The derailed equipment included five tank cars carrying dangerous goods. During the derailment, four of the tank cars sustained multiple punctures and released their products. The products ignited and a large fire engulfed the derailed cars.

The United States National Research Council was commissioned via the US Hazardous Materials Transportation Uniform Safety Act (1990) by the Federal Railroad Administration to write an impartial report on "(1) the railroad tank car design process, including specifications development, design approval, repair process approval, repair accountability, and the process by which designs and repairs are presented, weighed, and evaluated, and, (2) railroad tank car design criteria, including whether head shields should be installed on all tank cars that carry hazardous materials." It is entitled "Ensuring Railroad Tank Car Safety" and available as ISBN 0-309-05518-0.

==== Lac-Mégantic derailment ====
As mentioned above, derailment of a train containing Bakken crude oil derailed in the town of Lac-Mégantic, leading to a fire and explosion that led to many deaths and destruction of buildings. One issue raised by the Lac-Mégantic derailment, and substantiated by Enbridge complaints to the US regulator, is that Bakken crude oil is associated with a notable volatility.

The US Federal Railroad Administration moved on 8 August 2013 to tighten standards for shipments of crude oil from the Bakken formation fields that contain volatile and/or corrosive chemicals, such as may issue from the hydraulic fracturing process. Crude oil is classed as Class 3 Flammable Liquid. The US regulator had ignored until 8 August 2013 the corrosive contents of Bakken formation crude oil.

Hydrogen sulfide (H_{2}S, sour gas), a gas which is toxic to humans and flammable, has been detected as well in Bakken crude by Enbridge. The academic community commented in 2011 that increased concentration of H_{2}S was observed in the field and presented challenges such as "health and environmental risks, corrosion of wellbore, added expense with regard to materials handling and pipeline equipment, and additional refinement requirements". Holubnyak et al. write, further, that Bakken crude "may become soured through current oil field practices". At issue in the Lac-Mégantic derailment, then, is whether World Fuel Services and other defendants ought to have been aware of this two-year-old research when they ordered the DOT-111 tank cars (which were already in 2012 acknowledged by the US NTSB regulator to be deficient for these purposes) to be loaded on the Lac-Mégantic train.

The Lac-Mégantic runaway train had earlier passed through Toronto on its way from the Bakken fields of Dakota. A Canadian National employee said that roughly 10% of shipments through Toronto contain hazardous materials that are often stored on DOT-111 tank cars, but that only first responders have access to HAZMAT shipment information.

== New construction standards ==
Thirteen DOT-111 tank cars lost about 324,000 US gallons (1,230,000 L; 270,000 imp gal) of ethanol contaminating a tributary of the Rock River resulting in one of the largest fish kills in Illinois history. As a result of an accident in Cherry Valley, Illinois, in 2009, the Association of American Railroads studied several options for increasing the crashworthiness of DOT-111 tank car designs and published new construction standards in a Casualty Prevention Circular, with the intent to revise the AAR Manual for Standards and Recommended Practices for tank cars that are used to transport ethanol and crude oil. Beginning on October 1, 2011, the new AAR standard for DOT-111 tank cars requires tank heads and shells to be constructed of thicker steel. The new specification also requires that heads and shells be constructed of normalized steel, and in all cases 1/2-inch (12.7 mm) thick half head shields must be provided. The AAR has also mandated a more robust housing or rollover skid for protection of top fittings. The new standards only apply to newly manufactured cars; there is no requirement to retrofit, repurpose, or retire existing DOT-111A cars built to the older design. The NTSB has called that design "inadequate," noting the older cars are "subject to damage and catastrophic loss of hazardous materials."

In May 2015, the Federal Railroad Administration and Transport Canada jointly announced the new DOT-117 specification to supersede the DOT-111 design for all flammable class products, of which all examples would be required to be retired or rebuilt by May 2025.

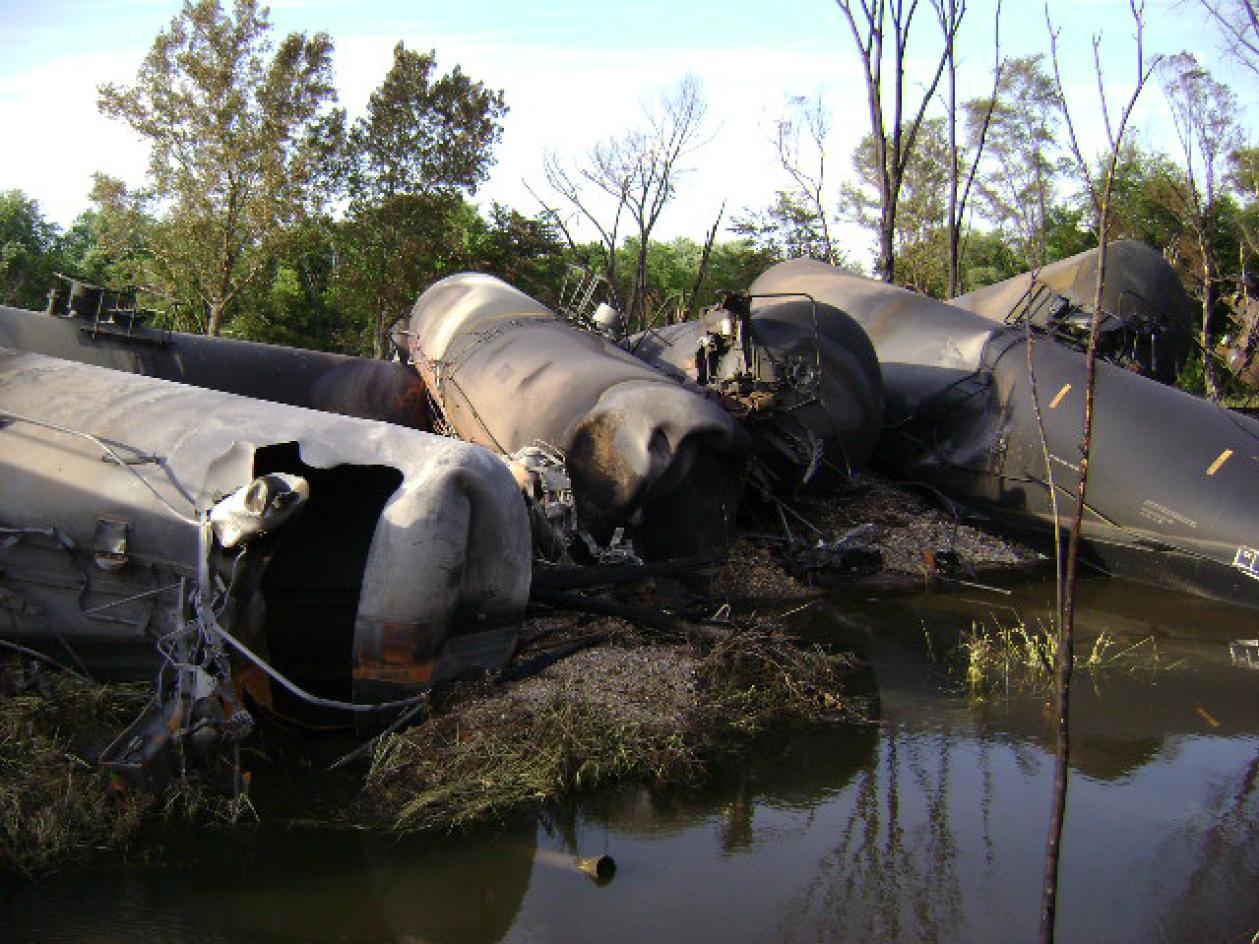
Derailment in Cherry Valley, Illinois

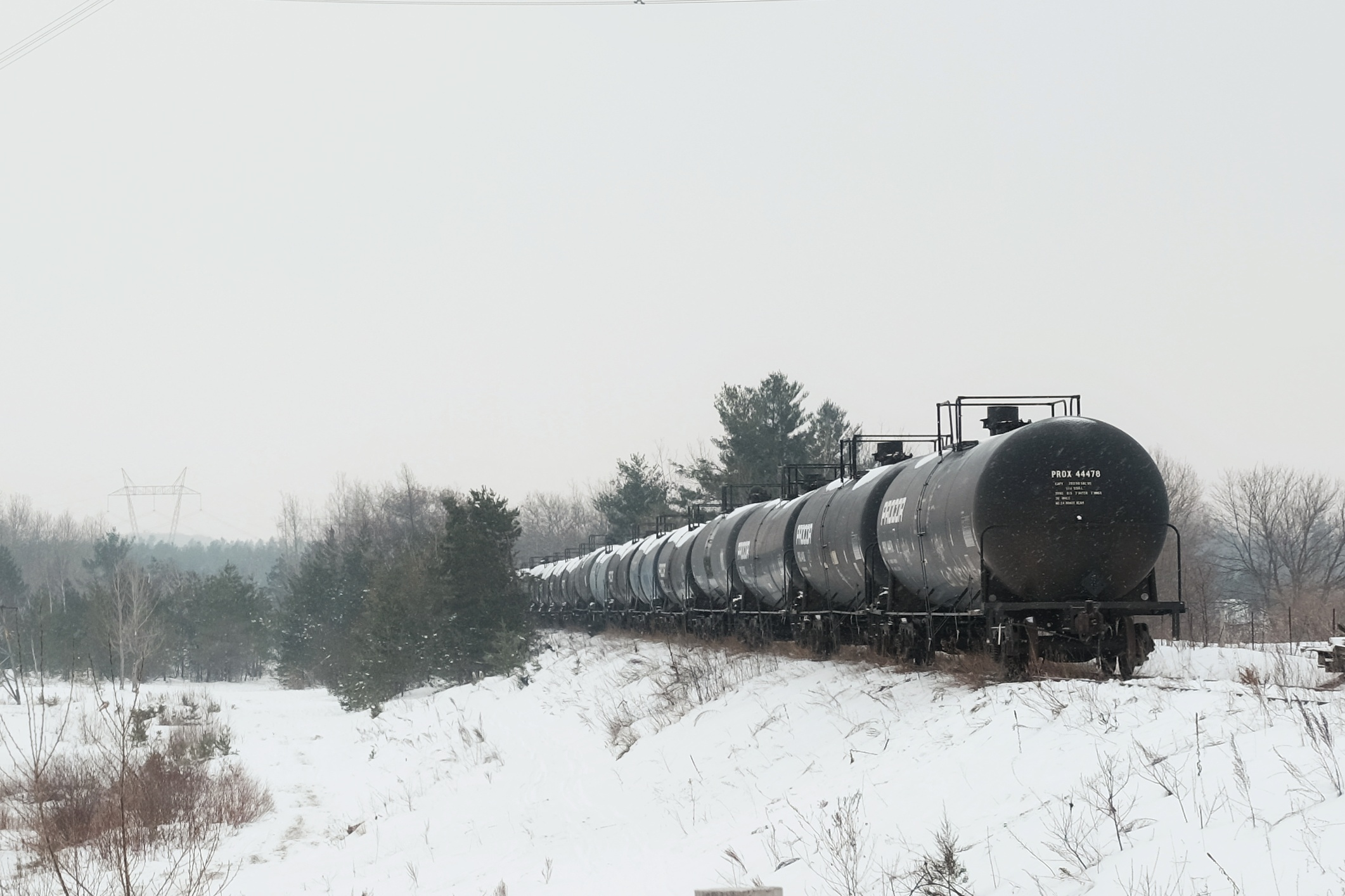
A string of DOT-111 cars on the former Canadian National Penetang Spur in Essa, Ontario, Canada awaiting their trip to be recycled. Photo taken on December 11, 2018.

== See also ==
- Pipeline and Hazardous Materials Safety Administration (PHMSA)
