= Lac-Mégantic rail disaster =

2013 oil train crash in Québec, Canada

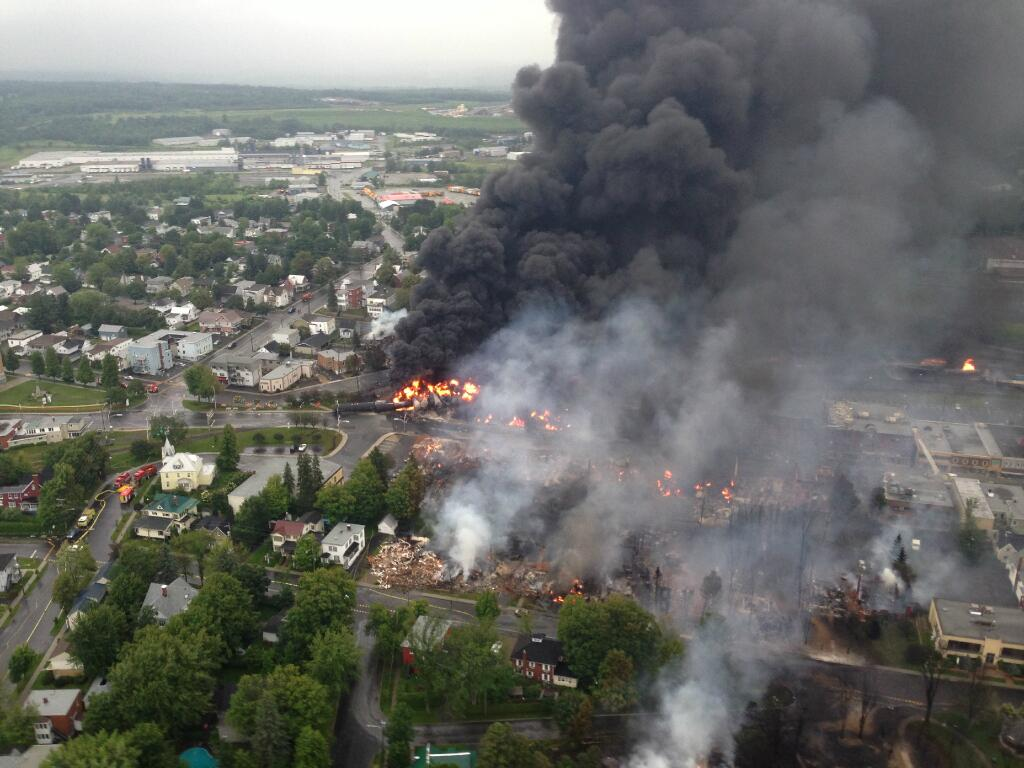
- Police helicopter view of Lac-Mégantic, the day of the derailment

- Location within Quebec

Details
- Date: July 6, 2013; 13 years ago 01:14 EDT (05:14 UTC)
- Location: Lac-Mégantic, Quebec, Canada
- Coordinates: 45°34′40″N 70°53′6″W
- Country: Canada
- Operator: Montreal, Maine and Atlantic Railway
- Incident type: Derailment of a runaway train, explosion
- Cause: Neglect, defective locomotive, poor maintenance, driver error, flawed operating procedures, weak regulatory oversight, lack of safety redundancy

Statistics
- Trains: 1
- Deaths: 47 (42 confirmed, 5 presumed)
- Damage: More than 30 buildings destroyed, 36 to be demolished due to contamination

On July 6, 2013, at approximately 1:14 a.m. EDT, an unattended 73-car Montreal, Maine and Atlantic Railway (MMA) freight train carrying Bakken Formation crude oil rolled down a 1.2% grade and derailed in downtown Lac-Mégantic, resulting in the explosion and fire of multiple tank cars. Forty-seven people were killed. More than 30 buildings in Lac-Mégantic's town centre (roughly half of the downtown area) were destroyed, and all but three of the thirty-nine remaining buildings had to be demolished due to petroleum contamination. Initial newspaper reports described a 1 km (0.6-mile) blast radius.

The Transportation Safety Board of Canada identified multiple causes for the accident, principally leaving a train unattended on a main line, failure to set enough handbrakes, and lack of a backup safety mechanism.

The death toll of 47 makes this the fourth-deadliest rail accident in Canadian history, and the deadliest involving a non-passenger train. It is also the deadliest rail accident since Canada's confederation in 1867. The previous Canadian rail accident with a higher death toll was the Beloeil train disaster in 1864, which killed 99.

== Background ==
=== The route ===
The railway passing through Lac-Mégantic was owned by the United States-based Montreal, Maine and Atlantic Railway (MMA). The MMA had owned and operated a former Canadian Pacific Railway (CPR) main line since January 2003, between Saint-Jean-sur-Richelieu, Quebec, in the west and Brownville Junction, Maine, in the east.

The rail line through Lac-Mégantic and across Maine was built in the late 1880s as part of the final link in CPR's transcontinental system between Montreal and Saint John, New Brunswick, with the section east of Lac-Mégantic known as the International Railway of Maine. A 1970s proposal to reroute the line to bypass downtown Lac-Mégantic was never implemented because of cost. The rail line was owned by CPR until sold in segments in January 1995.

Via Rail discontinued passenger service on the route in December 1994 owing to the pending change in ownership, as Via regulations then prohibited its passenger trains from operating on tracks that were not owned by either of Canada's two national railway companies. The eastern half of the line between Brownville Junction and Saint John was sold to the industrial conglomerate J. D. Irving, which established two subsidiaries: the Eastern Maine Railway and New Brunswick Southern Railway (NBSR). The western half of the line between Brownville Junction toward Montreal was sold to Iron Road Railways (IRR), a U.S.-based company, which established a subsidiary called Canadian American Railroad.

IRR filed for bankruptcy for its subsidiary company in fall 2002. The former CPR main line from Saint-Jean-sur-Richelieu to Brownville Junction was sold to Rail World Inc. in January 2003. Rail World formed the MMA as a subsidiary and engaged in aggressive cost cutting for freight train operations and continued to defer maintenance on the tracks to the point where much of the track was in marginal condition.

Transport Canada permits a railway to remain in service with as few as five solid ties and 14 damaged ties in a 12-metre (39 ft) section of track, provided trains are limited to 16 km/h (10 mph) on straight flat track. MMA failed to take advantage of millions of dollars of available federal/provincial 2:1 matching infrastructure grants under a 2007 program as track conditions on the MMA line in Quebec continued to deteriorate. By 2013, speed reductions were required on 23 portions of the line, including an 8.0 km/h (5 mph) limit at Sherbrooke yard and 16 kilometres per hour (10 mph) on an 18-kilometre (11 mi) stretch east of Magog.

=== The train ===
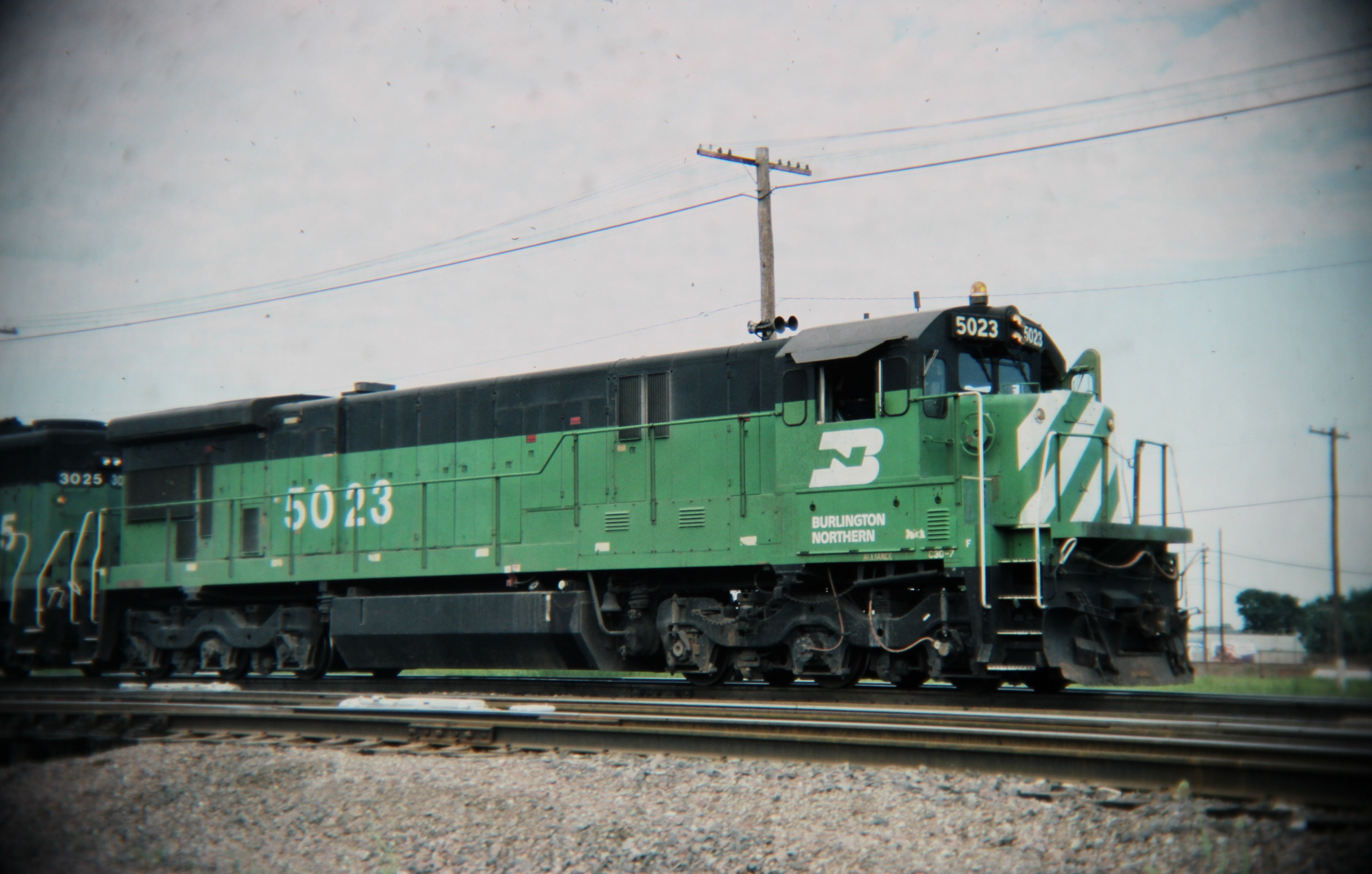
GE C30-7 No. 5023, one of the locomotives involved, seen when it was operating for the Burlington Northern Railroad in 1986

The freight train, designated "MMA 2", was 1,433 m (4,701 ft) long and weighed 10,287 metric tons (10,125 long tons; 11,339 short tons). The train was composed of

- MMA C30-7 No. 5017 (ex-BN) the main locomotive involved
- remote-control car VB-1 (a former caboose) used to house the Locotrol equipment necessary for MMA's single-engineer train operation
- MMA C30-7 No. 5026 (ex-BN)
- CITX SD40-2 No. 3053 (ex-CP No. 5740)
- MMA C30-7 No. 5023 (ex-BN)
- CEFX SD40-2 No. 3166 (ex-UP No. 3360)
- a loaded box car used as a buffer car
- 72 non-pressure dangerous goods DOT-111 tank cars loaded with Bakken Formation crude oil (Class 3, UN 1267). Each tank car carried 113,000 litres (25,000 imp gal; 30,000 US gal) of crude oil.

The oil, shipped by World Fuel Services subsidiary Dakota Plains Holdings, Inc., from New Town, North Dakota, originated from the Bakken Formation. The destination was the Irving Oil Refinery in Saint John, New Brunswick. Shipment of the oil was contracted to CPR, which transported it on CPR tracks from North Dakota to the CPR yard in Côte-Saint-Luc, a Montreal suburb. CPR sub-contracted MMA to transport the oil from the CPR yard in Côte-Saint-Luc to the MMA yard in Brownville Junction. CPR also sub-contracted NBSR to transport it from the MMA yard in Brownville Junction to the final destination at the Saint John refinery. Ministry of Transport senior inspector Marc Grignon opined, "When the shipper is based outside Canada, the importer becomes the shipper." Irving Oil Commercial G.P. was the shipper in this case. 3,830 rail cars of Bakken crude were shipped by 67 trains in the nine-month period preceding the derailment.

In 2009, in the United States, 69% of the tank car fleet were DOT-111 cars. In Canada, the same car (under the designation CTC-111A) represented close to 80% of the fleet. The National Transportation Safety Board (NTSB) noted that the cars "have a high incidence of tank failures during accidents", citing in 2009 their "inadequate design" as a factor in a fatal rail collision outside Rockford, Illinois. Even before the Lac-Mégantic accident, attempts were made to require redesign or replacement of existing cars in the U.S.; these were delayed amidst fierce lobbying from rail and petroleum industry groups concerned about the cost. Since 2011, the Canadian government had required tank cars with a thicker shell, though older models were still allowed to operate.

Freight trains operated by MMA were allowed (not "permitted", see below) by regulators in Canada (Transport Canada) and the United States (Federal Railroad Administration, or FRA) to have single-person train operation (SPTO, alternately OPTO) status (one operator). The "permit" process, which requires public input, was not followed. Transport Canada and the MMA entered a negotiation process at the culmination of which, sometime before the second week of July 2012, the government allowed MMA to reduce their manpower to SPTO. An average of 80 tank cars per train was carried on the Lac-Mégantic route under the supervision of one person only. The Maine regulator had already allowed SPTO status before the first week of April 2012.

In May 2010, former MMA engineer Jarod Briggs of Millinocket, Maine, explained to the Bangor Daily News that "so much could happen in a 12-hour shift on one of these trains, such as a washed-out track, downed trees or mechanical failure. What if the engineer on board were to encounter a medical problem? Who is going to know about it? If there is a fire engine or an ambulance needing to get by a train or a crossing when that happens, it could take hours." Briggs left MMA to work for another railway in 2007; while he described the lone crew member involved in the Lac-Mégantic derailment as "a very good engineer, one of the better on the property", he had long expressed safety concerns about MMA's overall train operations because "if you have two people watching you can catch a mistake. It was all about cutting, cutting, cutting."

The Transportation Safety Board of Canada (TSB) looked at whether SPTO played a role in the accident. After looking at the circumstances of the night of the derailment, the investigation was not able to conclude whether having another crew member would have prevented the accident.

Air brakes on the train are supplied with air from a compressor on each locomotive. When a locomotive is shut off, the compressor no longer supplies the brake system with air. An air brake pipe connects to each car and locomotive on the train. When air leaks from the various components, the air pressure drops. If the system is not recharged with air, the locomotive air brakes will become ineffective and provide no braking force. When the air brake control valves sense a drop in pressure in the brake pipe, they are designed to activate the brakes on each car. However, if the rate of leakage is slow and steady, the automatic brakes may not be applied as in the case of the Lac-Mégantic accident. However, it is the usual practice for an engineer parking a train, once the train is stopped, to apply the brakes on the cars in the train by releasing air from the train line, and allowing the air in the cars' reservoirs to apply the cars' brakes. Therefore, it would not matter if the automatic brakes applied themselves or not, as the car brakes would already be in the applied position. The train had locomotives that could automatically restart the air-brake system in the event of a brake failure, provided that these locomotives were not shut down, as they would be in this incident. Also, the TSB found that the "reset safety control" on the lead locomotive was not wired to set the entire train's brakes in the event of an engine failure.

In addition to air brake systems, all locomotives and rail cars are equipped with at least one hand brake. This is a mechanical device that applies brake shoes to the wheels to prevent them from moving. The effectiveness of hand brakes depends on several factors, including their age, their maintained condition, their application in conjunction with air brakes, and the force exerted by the person applying the brake, which can vary widely. The TSB estimated that somewhere between 17 and 26 hand brakes would have been needed to secure the train. Had there been a two-man crew, either both locomotive crew, or one locomotive crew and one ground crew, they would have been able to perform a stabilization test, by releasing all air brakes and ensuring just the hand brakes would hold the train. Since there was only a one-man crew, this test was not possible.

== Chronology ==
=== Eight months before the derailment ===
In October 2012, the lead locomotive, a GE C30-7 designated No. 5017, was sent to MMA's repair shop following an engine failure. Because of the time and cost for a standard repair and the pressure to return the locomotive to service, the engine was repaired with an epoxy-like material that lacked the required strength and durability. This material failed in service, leading to engine surges and excessive black and white smoke. Eventually, oil began to accumulate in the body of the turbocharger, where it overheated and caught fire on the night of the derailment.

=== Events shortly before the derailment ===
The freight train "MMA 2" departed the CPR yard in Côte-Saint-Luc early in the day of July 5 and changed crews at the MMA yard in Farnham, Quebec. After departing Farnham, it stopped at about 23:00 at the designated MMA crew-change point in Nantes, which is 11 kilometres (6.8 mi) west of Lac-Mégantic.

The engineer, Tom Harding, parked the train on the main line by setting the brakes and followed standard procedure by shutting down four of the five locomotives. Harding could not park the train on the adjacent siding because MMA used it routinely to store empty boxcars for Tafisa, a particleboard factory in Lac-Mégantic's industrial park. The Nantes siding had a derail that could have stopped the train from accidentally departing. According to Transport Canada, it is unusual to leave an unattended train parked on a main line, but there were no regulations against it.

Harding left the lead locomotive No. 5017 running to keep air pressure supplied to the train's air brakes and also applied a number of hand brakes. Yves Bourdon, a member of MMA's board of directors, stated that the air brakes of all locomotives and freight cars had been activated, as well as hand brakes on five locomotives and ten of the 72 freight cars. However, the TSB agrees with a July 6 statement to police by Harding that he set hand brakes on just the five locomotive engines, a buffer car, and a car housing the remote control apparatus. Harding also attempted a brake test but incorrectly left the locomotive air brakes on; this gave the false impression that the hand brakes alone would hold the train.

Harding contacted the rail traffic controller in Farnham to advise them that the train was secure. Next, he contacted the rail traffic controller in Bangor, Maine, to report that the lead locomotive had experienced mechanical difficulties throughout the trip and that excessive black and white smoke was coming from its smoke stack. Expecting the smoke to settle, they agreed to deal with the situation the following morning.

Section 112 of the Canadian Rail Operating Rules states "when equipment is left at any point a sufficient number of hand brakes must be applied to prevent it from moving" and "the effectiveness of the hand brakes must be tested” before relying on their retarding force. The engineer tests the hand brakes by seeing if the train budges when trying to push and pull the train with locomotive power. If a train is left on an incline, the number of handbrakes needed to hold the train increases. The track from Nantes to Lac-Mégantic is downhill on a 1.2% grade. Nantes is 515 metres (1,690 ft) above sea level, Lac Mégantic is 108 m (354 ft) lower at 407 m (1,335 ft). The MMA claimed that its braking policy required the activation of hand brakes on the five locomotives and eleven freight cars, or 20.5% of the total train. However, the TSB confirmed evidence in the criminal charges citing MMA procedures requiring nine brakes to hold a 70–79 car train. The TSB concluded that a minimum of 17 and possibly as many as 26 hand brakes would have been needed to secure the train, depending on the amount of force with which they had been applied. Transport Canada does not validate the special instructions of a railway company or give any specific guidance on how many brakes must be applied for parked freight trains. While Transport Canada had repeatedly reprimanded MMA from 2004 to 2009 and in 2011 and 2012 for violations of CROR Section 112 handbrake requirements on parked trains in Nantes, no fines had been issued for the infractions.

The TSB found that MMA's operating plan was to leave the train parked on the main line, unattended, with an unlocked locomotive cab, alongside a public highway where it was accessible to the general public, with no additional protection. However, there were no rules against leaving a train unlocked, running and unattended, even if it contained dangerous materials and was stopped on the main line, on a slope, in the vicinity of a residential area.

After finishing his work, Harding departed by taxi for a local hotel, l'Eau Berge in downtown Lac-Mégantic, for the night. En route, the engineer told the taxi driver that he felt unsafe leaving a locomotive running while it was spitting oil and thick, black smoke. He said he wanted to call the U.S. office of MMA, in Hermon, Maine, as they would be able to give him other directives. Taxi driver André Turcotte described the engineer as covered in droplets of oil, which also covered the taxi's windscreen.

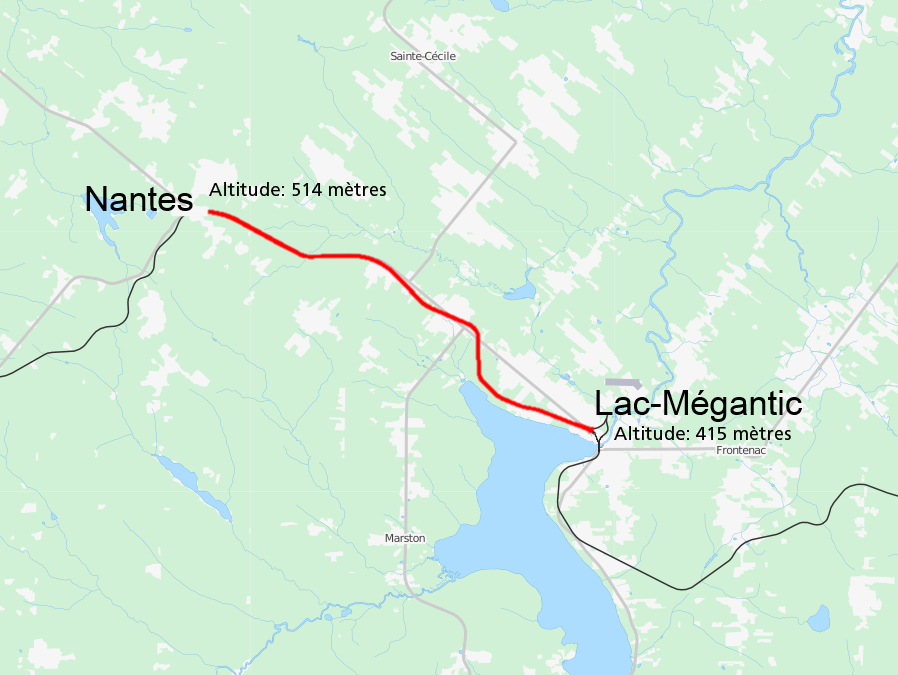
The train travelled 11 kilometres (6.8 mi) down a descending grade from Nantes to Lac-Mégantic.

Witnesses recalled seeing the train seemingly unattended and in distress around 22:45 that night. People driving on the road that parallels the rail line near Nantes recall seeing the train and having to slow down as they passed the locomotives where there was a thick dark blue cloud of diesel smoke being emitted as well as sparks coming out of a locomotive's exhaust, due to a broken piston in its diesel engine. According to the TSB, the MMA's rail traffic controller was warned of the train having technical difficulties while the train was still in Nantes on the evening of July 5.

After the engineer had departed, the Nantes Fire Department as well as a police officer from the Sûreté du Québec's Lac-Mégantic detachment responded to a 911 call from a citizen at 23:50 who reported a fire on the first locomotive; according to Nantes Fire Chief Patrick Lambert, "We shut down the engine before fighting the fire. Our protocol calls for us to shut down an engine because it is the only way to stop the fuel from circulating into the fire." The fire department extinguished the blaze and notified the Montreal, Maine and Atlantic Railway's rail traffic controller in Farnham. MMA did not grant permission to the engineer to return to the scene, instead summoning a track maintenance foreman unfamiliar with the operation of railway air brakes. By 00:13, two MMA track maintenance employees had arrived from Lac-Mégantic; the Nantes firefighters left the scene as the MMA employees confirmed to the police officer and to the Farnham rail traffic controller that the train was safe.

The MMA alleged that the lead locomotive was tampered with after Harding had left; that the diesel engine was shut down, thereby disabling the compressor powering the air brakes, which allowed the train to roll downhill from Nantes into Lac-Mégantic once the air pressure dropped in the reservoirs on the cars. Teamsters Canada Rail Conference vice-president Doug Finnson disputed this theory, stating that the key braking system on a stopped, unsupervised train are the hand brakes, which are completely independent from the motor-powered compressor that feeds the air brakes.

=== Derailment and explosion ===
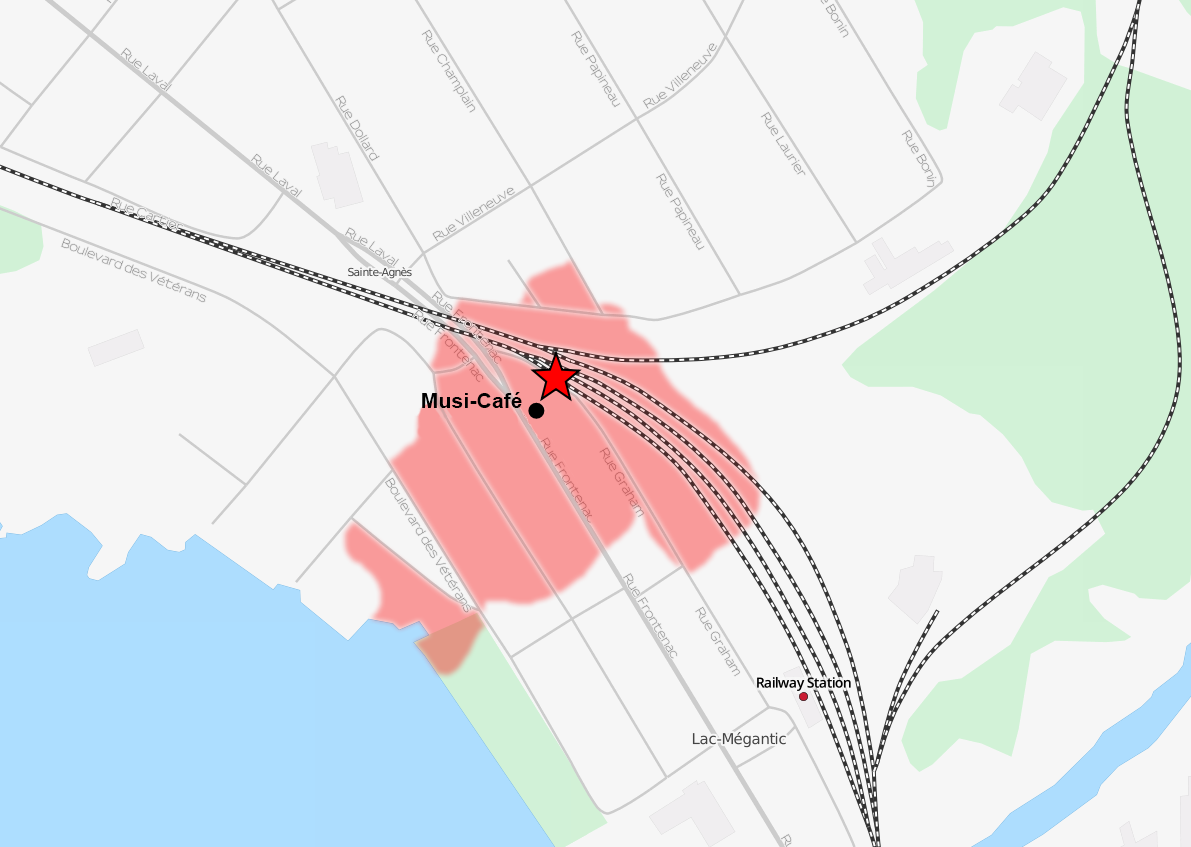
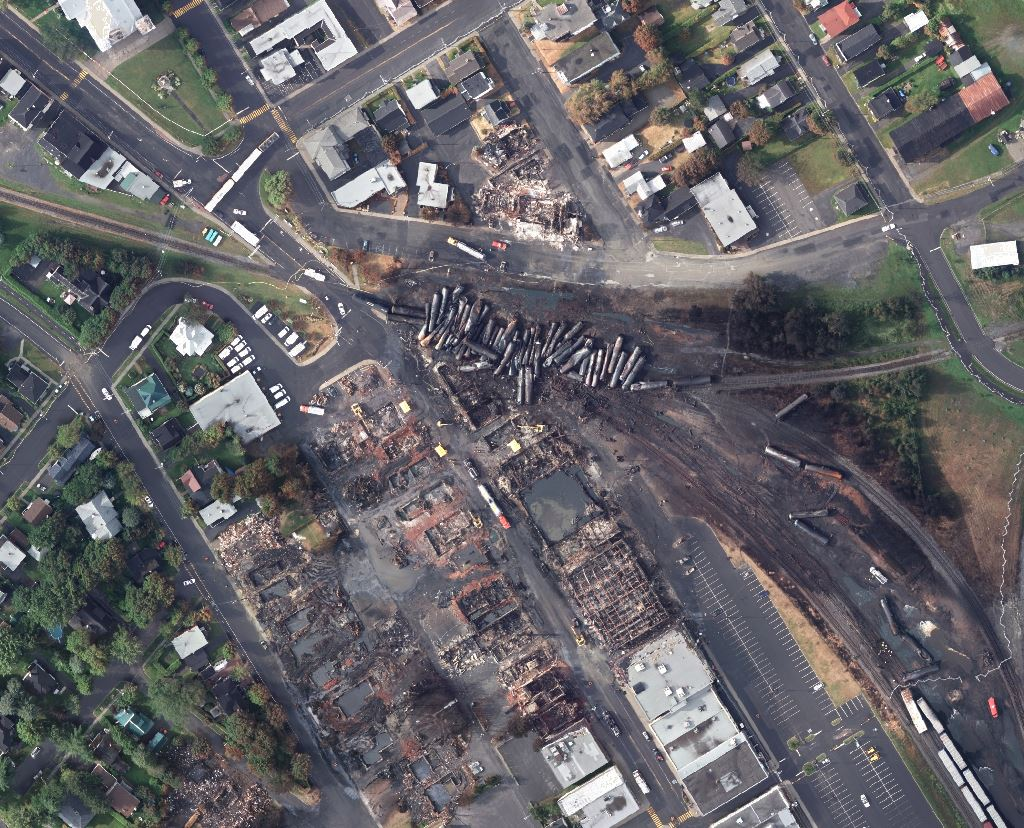
Map of area affected by the fires; aerial view of disaster site

With all the locomotives shut down, the air compressor no longer supplied air to the air brake system. As air leaked from the brake system, the main air reservoirs were slowly depleted, gradually reducing the effectiveness of the locomotive air brakes. At 00:56, the air pressure had dropped to a point at which the combination of locomotive air brakes and hand brakes could no longer hold the train, and it began to roll downhill toward Lac-Mégantic, just over 11 kilometres (7 mi) away. A witness recalled watching the train moving slowly toward Lac-Mégantic without the locomotive lights on. The track was not equipped with track circuits to alert the rail traffic controller to the presence of a runaway train. About ten minutes before the derailment occurred, firefighter Jean-Luc Montminy, who was heading home after helping put out the fire on the original locomotive of the train, was stopped at a railway crossing on Quebec Route 161, located just south-east of where the train began to roll. He stated that the crossing had activated and was warning of an oncoming train, but after waiting for some time, he heard no horn or any signal that a train was approaching. Thinking that the crossing was malfunctioning, he proceeded over the intersection when just as he had finished crossing, a train without its headlights or horn passed through at a very fast speed. Montminy recognised that it was the same train he had responded to hours earlier, and quickly returned to Nantes to inform other firefighters about what he had just witnessed. Gathering momentum on the long downhill slope, the train entered the town of Lac-Mégantic at high speed. The TSB's final report concluded that the train was travelling at 105 kilometres per hour (65 mph), more than six times the typical speed for that location. The rail line in this area was on a curve and had a speed limit for trains of 16 kilometres per hour (10 mph) as it is located at the west end of the Mégantic rail yard.

Just before the derailment, witnesses recalled observing the train passing through the crossing at an excessive speed with no locomotive lights, "infernal" noise and sparks being emitted from the wheels. It was also stated by witnesses that since the train was going so fast, the flashing lights or bells on the crossing signals did not activate. Gilles Fluet, a Musi-Café patron who was leaving the site just before the derailment, said the wheels were emitting much white smoke. The runaway train passed 50 metres (160 ft) behind him moving at highway speed. Travelling with no signals, the train jumped the track, sending a river of burning oil into the lake. "It was moving at a hellish speed ... no lights, no signals, nothing at all. There was no warning. It was a black blob that came out of nowhere. I realized they were oil tankers and they were going to blow up, so I yelled that to my friends and I got out of there. If we had stayed where we were, we would have been roasted."

The unmanned train derailed in downtown Lac-Mégantic at 01:14, in an area near the level crossing where the rail line crosses Frontenac Street, the town's main street. This location was approximately 600 metres (2,000 ft) northwest of the railway bridge over the Chaudière River and was also immediately north of the town's central business district.

People on the terrace at Musi-Café—a bar located next to the centre of the explosions—saw the tank cars leave the track and fled as a blanket of oil generated a ball of fire three times the height of the downtown buildings. Between four and six explosions were reported initially as tank cars ruptured and crude oil escaped along the train's trajectory. Heat from the fires was felt as far as 2 kilometres (1.2 mi) away. People jumped from the third floor of buildings in the central business district to escape the fire. As the blazing oil flowed over the ground, it entered the town's storm sewer and emerged as huge fires towering from other storm sewer drains, manholes, and even chimneys and basements of buildings in the area.

The Musi-Café tavern owner says that some employees and patrons felt the tremors of the train and thought it was an earthquake. They went out and started running. Other patrons and employees told some survivors that the tremors were an earthquake and that it would be better to stay under a table. Of those who went out, not all survived. Some were not able to outrun a "tsunami of fire". No boiling-liquid expanding-vapour explosion (BLEVE) occurred, according to the official investigation report, as no fragments were projected from the damaged tank cars.

The five locomotives and the VB car were found intact, separated from the rest of the train, outside the central part of town, still on track, but far from the crash scene. The six-car lead group had apparently uncoupled from the rest of the train, continued rolling down the track, crossed the river bridge, travelled through a sharp right bend, and eventually stopped about 1 kilometre (0.62 miles) southwest of the derailment site (45°34′8″N 70°53′20″W). The equipment that derailed included 63 of the 72 tank cars as well as the buffer car. Nine tank cars at the rear of the train remained on the track and did not explode; emergency responders took them away from the derailment site while the fire was still burning. Almost all of the derailed tank cars were damaged, many having large breaches. About six million litres of petroleum crude oil were quickly released; the fire began almost immediately.

=== Emergency response ===
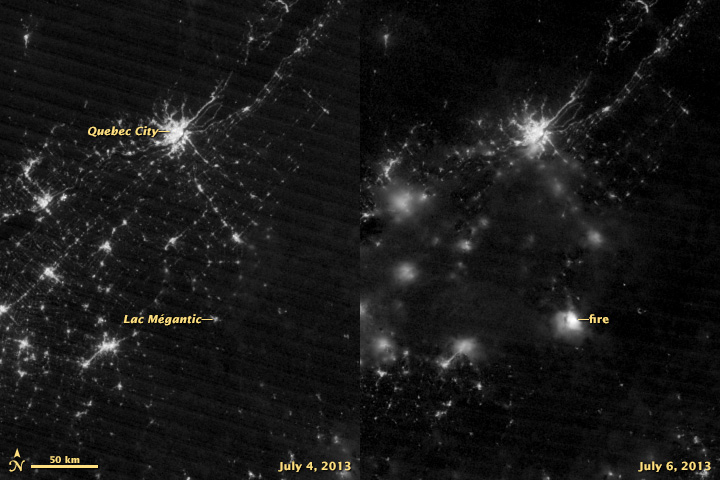
Infrared image taken by NASA's Suomi NPP satellite shows the fire that followed the derailment: on the left, taken two days before; on the right, taken about two hours after the explosions.

Around 150 firefighters were deployed to the scene, described as looking like a "war zone". Some were called in from as far away as the city of Sherbrooke, Quebec, and as many as eight trucks carrying 30 firefighters were dispatched from Franklin County, Maine, United States (Chesterville, Eustis, Farmington, New Vineyard, Phillips, Rangeley and Strong). The fire was contained and prevented from spreading further in the early afternoon.

The local hospital went to Code Orange, anticipating a high number of casualties and requesting reinforcements from other medical centres, but they received no seriously injured patients. A Canadian Red Cross volunteer said there were "no wounded. They're all dead". One off-duty Musi-Café cook, Bernard Théberge, was on the terrace at the time of the derailment and was treated for second-degree burns to one arm. The hospital was later used to shelter dozens of seniors who had been evacuated. Approximately 1,000 people were evacuated initially after the derailment, explosions, and fires. An estimated 1,000 people were evacuated later during the day because of toxic fumes. Some took refuge in an emergency shelter established by the Red Cross in a local high school.

According to initial claims made by the railway, the engineer who left the train unattended went to the explosion zone and uncoupled the last nine undamaged tank cars that were still on the tracks at the end of the derailment. After uncoupling the tank cars, he used a rail car mover to pull them away from the derailment site. This version of events was disputed by Lac-Mégantic's fire chief, who indicated that a volunteer firefighter had used a rail car mover borrowed from a local factory to remove these cars from danger. It was later revealed that two employees of Tafisa (Serge Morin, Sylvain Grégoire), a firefighter (Benoît Héon), the MMA engineer (Tom Harding) and a member of the family-owned excavation company Lafontaine and Son (Pascal Lafontaine) had worked to move nine tank cars away from the fire. Tafisa, a local particleboard industry that moves much of its product by rail, had a rail car mover which had the capability to deactivate the brakes on the cars it tows. Morin, aided by his colleague Grégoire, used the rail car mover to move the first five tank cars away from the fire. When they could not find a level crossing to move the rail car mover back to the disaster site, they used a loader to remove another four tank cars, two at a time. Because the loader lacked equipment to deactivate railcar brakes, Harding told the men to use the loader to break the air lines on cars to release the air brakes on each of these four cars. Lafontaine's workers hauled gravel to the site, created firebreaks and blocked manholes as burning oil spread into the town's storm sewer system.

After 20 hours, the centre of the fire was still inaccessible to firefighters and five pools of fuel were still burning. A special fire-retardant foam was brought from an Ultramar refinery in Lévis, aiding progress by firefighters on Saturday night. The fire chief, Denis Lauzon, said in an interview that they were offered 30,000 L of foam at the cost of $300,000 which he accepted. Five of the unexploded cars were doused with high-pressure water to prevent further explosions, and two were still burning and at risk of exploding 36 hours later. The train's event recorder was recovered at around 15:00 the next day and the fire was finally extinguished in the evening, after burning for nearly two days.

A red zone was declared in which evacuees could not return to their homes because of the ongoing investigation.

== Casualties and damage ==
42 bodies were found and transported to Montreal to be identified. 39 of those were identified by investigators by late August 2013 and the 40th in April 2014. Identification of additional victims became increasingly difficult after the August 1 end of the on-site search and family members were asked to provide DNA samples of those missing, as well as dental records. The bodies of five presumed victims were never found. It is possible that some of the missing people were vapourised by the explosions. As two of the three local notary offices were destroyed by fire (and only one of the document vaults survived the blaze), the last will and testament of some victims of the disaster were lost.

At least 30 buildings were destroyed in the centre of town (along rue Frontenac from rue Milette to boulevard Sterns), including the town's library, post office, a historic former Bank of Montreal building (at 5193 rue Frontenac), and other businesses and houses. In total, 115 businesses were destroyed, displaced, or rendered inaccessible. The Musi-Café was destroyed and three of its employees were among the dead or missing. While the town built some new infrastructure and commercial space, many of the historic buildings lost were irreplaceable.

“We will rebuild our town. But at the same time, we have to accept that it won’t be the one we knew. Very old buildings, heritage and architecture all disappeared and at the beginning, no one realized the magnitude and now we are starting to understand the consequences.”

— Colette Roy-Laroche, mayor of Lac-Mégantic

A number of businesses had to operate from temporary locations outside the downtown, with reduced facilities until new buildings could be constructed elsewhere, as cleanup efforts were expected to take a year or more. The municipal water supply for Lac-Mégantic was shut down on the evening of the explosion because of a leak inside the blast zone, requiring trucks carrying drinking water, though the leak was repaired overnight and a precautionary boil-water advisory issued. The industrial park lost access to rail service in both directions as the line remained severed until December 2013. Claims to local insurers were estimated at $25 million for Intact Financial, $18 million for Promutuel and $7 million for Desjardins Group.

== Aftermath ==
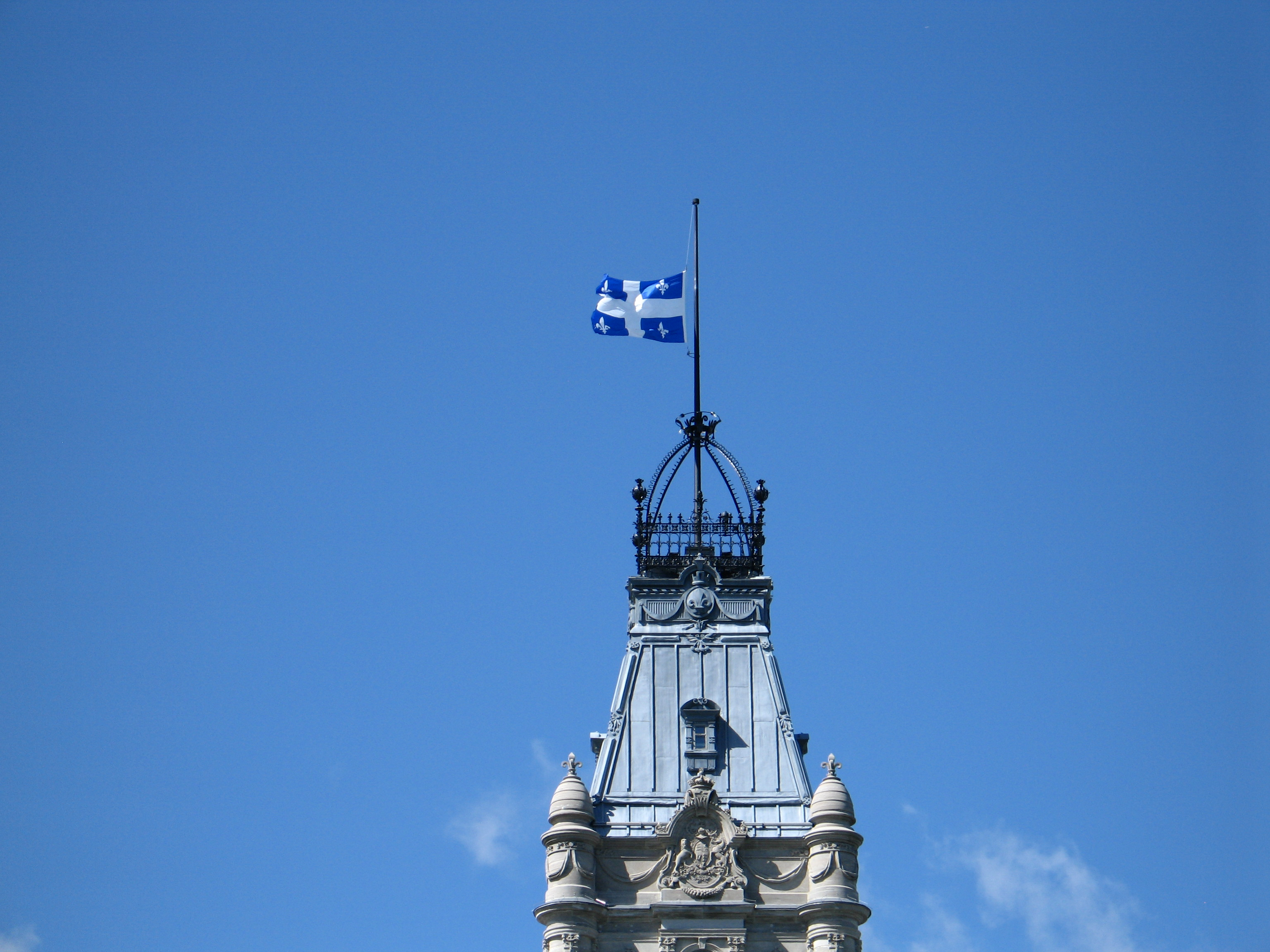
The Lieutenant Governor-in-Council ordered all provincial flags to be flown at half mast on public buildings for 7 days following the derailment.

All but around 800 of the evacuated residents were allowed to return to their homes in the afternoon of the third day; all but around 200 were able to return by the sixth day. At least twenty had no home to return to. Some homes had reportedly been broken into during their vacancies, although police deny that homes were looted.

Rail World's president and CEO Edward Burkhardt visited the town on July 10, 2013, and was heckled by residents. After the accident, the railway's safety record was called into question: over the previous decade the firm recorded a higher accident rate than the rest of the U.S. rail fleet, according to data from the Federal Railroad Administration. In the previous year, the railroad had 36.1 accidents per million miles travelled, in comparison to a national average of 14.6 accidents. (Note: Data is derived from a comparison of two reports—one for all railroads and one for the individual railroad. Data is for incidents occurring in the United States only.) Burkhardt's historical involvement with a 1996 derailment on the Wisconsin Central in which hazardous materials burned for over two weeks also drew renewed scrutiny.

While the actual cause of the disaster was still under provincial (Sûreté du Québec) and federal (Transportation Safety Board) investigation, Burkhardt announced the railway had suspended the engineer for allegedly improperly setting the handbrakes on the rail cars. The engineer was made unavailable at the suggestion of his lawyer and MMA instructed its employees not to answer questions from police without first consulting the company's lawyers. A former colleague established an Albany-based legal defence fund for the engineer. The Sûreté du Québec raided MMA offices in Farnham on July 25 as part of a criminal investigation into the Lac-Mégantic fatalities; the Transportation Safety Board conducted its own search backed by the RCMP (the federal police in Canada) on August 1.

Raymond Lafontaine, a local contractor who lost a son, two daughters-in-law and an employee, raised concerns about the poor condition of MMA-owned track and about the increasing quantity of dangerous goods being transported through downtown areas by rail, not only in Lac-Mégantic but in cities such as Sherbrooke. He asked that the tracks be repaired and rerouted to bypass the town's core.

Lac-Mégantic mayor Colette Roy-Laroche sought assistance from federal and provincial governments to move the trains away from the downtown, a proposal opposed by the railway due to cost, and asked tourists not to abandon the region. MMA announced that it intended to make future crew changes in Sherbrooke so that trains would no longer be left unattended; that city's mayor, Bernard Sévigny, expressed concern that this would merely shift the hazard into the centre of Quebec's sixth-largest city.

=== Changes to operations and procedures ===
The two major Class I Canadian railways, Canadian Pacific Railway and Canadian National Railway, indicated that they would not be leaving unattended locomotives unlocked outside a terminal or yard, and that CPR tank car trains containing regulated commodities would no longer be left unattended on a main line.

On August 6, 2013, Burkhardt stated that MMA had no further plans to carry oil by rail. The following day, the company filed for bankruptcy protection in both the Quebec Superior Court in Montreal (under the Companies' Creditors Arrangement Act) and the United States Bankruptcy Court in Bangor, Maine, (under Chapter 11).

On August 13, 2013, the Canadian Transportation Agency suspended the railway's Certificate of Fitness effective August 20 because of its failure to obtain adequate insurance coverage, shutting down the line. It later extended this deadline to conditionally allow operation until October 18. While the amount of liability insurance is not listed on the federal Certificate of Fitness for reasons unknown, MMA's bankruptcy petition disclosed an insurance policy valued at $25 million and an estimated cleanup cost, which excludes damages in tort, of $200 million. MMA's Certificate of Fitness was last modified in 2005, to reflect the use of the line by Orford Express (an independently owned passenger service between Magog and Sherbrooke). It is unclear whether notice was given of the oil-by-rail shipments which began in 2012 despite a requirement to "notify the Agency in writing without delay if [...] the [...] operation has changed so that the liability insurance coverage may no longer be adequate."

In Maine, state transportation authorities contacted all rival freight operators in-state to establish a contingency plan; if MMA ceased operation, U.S. federal law required a trustee keep the line operating until a buyer was found because of the MMA's status as a monopoly in many communities. The U.S. had no requirement that privately owned railways carry liability insurance.

On August 22, 2013, the Canadian Transportation Agency ordered CPR to reinstate delivery to MMA, a move CPR (as one of multiple firms ordered by Quebec's government to pay for the costly cleanup of oil spilled by MMA at Lac-Mégantic) considered an unacceptable safety risk. Canadian Pacific chief executive officer Hunter Harrison stated that, "While we disagree with this order, we have taken immediate steps to comply. The CTA, as federal regulator, has satisfied itself that MMA is fit to operate and has adequate insurance to do so. We will review our legal options." The CTA also found that "the balance of inconvenience clearly favours MMA as the refusal to grant the interim order would result in the virtual cessation of MMA's operations." The CTA also held that issues regarding public safety were none of its concern.

In separate developments also occurring on August 22, 2013, the New Brunswick and Maine Railway company, a division of the J. D. Irving conglomerate, indicated its interest in acquiring the troubled MMA railway, and the Canadian Transportation Agency indicated it would review insurance coverage of federally chartered railways at some point "in the fall". The same day, the Quebec government hired Paul Hastings, a Quebec bankruptcy specialist firm with standing in New York State, to represent it in American proceedings.

United States Federal Railroad Administration administrator Joseph C. Szabo wrote to the MMA the following day, stating that "I was shocked to see that you changed your operating procedures to use two-person crews on trains in Canada, but not in the United States. Because the risk associated with this accident also exists in the United States, it is my expectation that the same safety procedures will apply to your operations."

As of December 18, 2013, the MMA was again allowed to operate between Sherbrooke and Lac-Mégantic, including going through Lac-Mégantic itself, as before the derailment. However, operations within Lac-Mégantic were subject to numerous restrictions, such as a prohibition on transport of dangerous cargo; a train's manifest being released no less than four hours ahead; no parking on tracks within 4 km (2 mi) of the town centre; a conductor and engineer must be on board; and a train's speed must not exceed 16 km/h (10 mph). On that date, a test train carrying particle board from the local Tafisa factory to Sherbrooke rolled through the town centre. It was reported that there were plans to reroute the tracks outside the town by changing the track's route between Nantes and Frontenac, but no time table had been set. The railway's assets were sold in a January 21, 2014 Portland bankruptcy auction to Railroad Acquisition Holdings, a subsidiary of Fortress Investment Group as Central Maine and Quebec Railway (reporting mark CMQR). In July 2016, it was announced that all DOT-111 tank cars would be withdrawn from transporting crude oil on railways in Canada by November 1, 2016, although their use for transporting other flammable liquids will be allowed until 2025. A new design of tank car, the TC-117, is the new standard.

== Response ==
On July 6, 2013, Quebec Premier Pauline Marois surveyed the scene, expressing profound sadness in response to the devastation in Lac-Mégantic. The following day, Prime Minister Stephen Harper offered his prayers and condolences to those affected. On July 8, 2013, Canada's monarch, Queen Elizabeth II, issued a message expressing her and Prince Philip, Duke of Edinburgh's "profound sadness [over the] tragic events that have befallen the town of Lac-Mégantic" and hope "that in time it will be possible to rebuild both the property and the lives of those who have been affected." The Queen's federal representative, Governor General David Johnston, released a similar message on the same day, as did her provincial representative, Lieutenant Governor Pierre Duchesne, on July 6, and the Queen's son, Prince Charles, and his wife on July 9.

In a letter to Harper, U.S. President Barack Obama expressed condolences for the "devastating loss of life" and offered American help, if needed. French President François Hollande issued a statement expressing France's solidarity with victims and authorities. Pope Francis sent a special apostolic blessing from the Vatican to those touched by the tragedy, along with his sympathy to victims, their families, and emergency workers. The Maine Legislature passed a resolution on July 10 in support of the people of Lac-Mégantic; speaking in French, House majority leader Seth Berry said "Aujourd'hui, nous sommes tous des citoyens de Lac-Mégantic" ("Today, we are all citizens of Lac-Mégantic.")

Keith Stewart, Climate and Energy Campaign Coordinator with Greenpeace Canada, criticised Canada's energy policy within hours of the tragedy, saying that "whether it's pipelines or rail, we have a safety problem in this country. This is more evidence that the federal government continues to put oil profits ahead of public safety."

== Technical investigation ==
The Transportation Safety Board of Canada (TSB) launched an investigation into the accident. In its August 2014 report, the TSB identified 18 distinct causes and contributing factors, which included leaving the train unattended on a main line, failure to set enough hand brakes, the lack of a backup safety mechanism, poor maintenance on the locomotive and several failures of training and oversight. Locomotive No. 5017 was held from sale for a mechanical investigation, showing years' worth of deferred maintenance which caused the failure. Five other locomotives were investigated as well (MMA 5018, 5023, 8208, 8546 and 8578) which also showed rust, oil leaks, and missing parts that could have led to additional failures.

== Criminal investigation ==
The provincial police organisation, the Sûreté du Québec (SQ), led the recovery of the dead in Lac-Mégantic, alongside the Bureau du Coroner du Québec.

The SQ investigated the MMA railway offices in Farnham, Quebec, on July 25, with a warrant and planned to seize evidence about the fatal event. It was unknown whether the SQ had plans to broaden the scope of their investigation to include, for example, the broker at World Fuel Services who chose to employ deficient DOT-111 tank cars.

On May 12, 2014, the Montreal, Maine and Atlantic Railway was charged with 47 counts of criminal negligence; engineer Thomas Harding, manager of train operations Jean DeMaître and rail traffic controller Richard Labrie were arrested and appeared in Lac-Mégantic's court. Of the 79 railcars, only seven brakes had been applied, where MMA guidelines indicate 9 as a minimum and experts advise 15 brakes should have been used for the slope the train was on. No hand brakes had been applied on 72 of the cars.

The United Steelworkers union in Quebec, which represents the engineer and controller, denounced the failure to lay charges against CEO Ed Burkhardt, and raised funds for the legal defence of unionized workers, whom it identified as scapegoats.

The defective locomotive MMA 5017, a key piece of evidence in the criminal enquiry, inexplicably turned up at the former MMA Derby Yard in Milo, Maine, as part of a collection of equipment destined to an August 2014 auction on behalf of the Bangor Savings Bank, a creditor.

Harding, Demaître and Labrie were charged with 47 counts of criminal negligence causing death.

On June 22, 2015, new charges under the Canadian Railway Safety Act and the Fisheries Act "of failing to ensure the train was properly braked before it was left unmanned for the night" were laid against Maine & Atlantic Railway Corp (MMA)'s Demaître, Harding, then-chief executive officer and president Robert C. Grindrod, Lynne Labonté, general manager of transportation, Kenneth Strout, director of operating practices and Mike Horan, assistant director. If convicted the charges carry "a maximum fine of $50,000, a maximum jail term of six months."

=== Trial ===
Following a jury selection process that lasted three weeks, the trial of three people in connection with the disaster began on October 2, 2017. The locomotive engineer, rail traffic controller, and operations manager were each charged with 47 counts of criminal negligence causing death and faced a sentence of life imprisonment if convicted. The trial took place in Sherbrooke, Quebec. The prosecution called a total of 36 witnesses and the trial was scheduled to finish in December 2017. On December 12, the defence announced that they would not be calling any witnesses as they believed the Crown had not met the necessary burden of proof. The trial was adjourned until January 3, 2018. Jurors acquitted the three former Montreal, Maine and Atlantic (MMA) railway employees on January 19, 2018, after nine days of deliberations.

In the second trial, the six MMA employees pleaded guilty and were convicted to a $50,000 fine, except for Harding, who received six months house arrest for not testing the handbrakes after they were applied. MMAC, a MMA subsidiary, was also found guilty of polluting the river and fined $1 million.

== Environmental impact ==
The city prohibited all access to the downtown (including Frontenac, Thibodeau, Durand Streets and the boulevard des Vétérans) until June 2014 to permit a massive decontamination effort. Soil decontamination was expected to take until December 2014 to complete, although the water table appeared to be uncontaminated. Some buildings that were still standing, such as the local post office in Lac-Mégantic, were a total loss due to oil contamination. It may take up to five years to decontaminate some sites where homes formerly stood, forcing householders to rebuild elsewhere.

MMA's Labrie, Demaître, Harding, Grindrod, Labonté, Strout and Horan faced a Canadian federal Fisheries Act charge, with a potential maximum penalty of $1-million fine, for "the crude oil that flowed into Lac-Mégantic and the Chaudière River after the accident."

=== Contamination of land ===
The disaster site was so heavily contaminated with benzene that firefighters and investigators in the first month worked in 15-minute shifts due to heat and toxic conditions. The waterfront at Veteran's Park and the town marina were contaminated by hydrocarbons, which were contained by a series of booms. This rendered vessels and docks inaccessible until they could be removed from the water and decontaminated, a process which was to take until late August 2013 to complete.

A hundred residents were not expected to return home until mid-2014 as the ground beneath their still-standing houses was contaminated with oil; some homes in the most-contaminated areas might never be habitable.

Because the cleanup of the derailment area could take five years, about 115 businesses were planning to relocate. Forty buildings were already destroyed but another 160 might have needed to be expropriated for demolition because they sat on several metres of contaminated soil which had to be removed and replaced with clean fill. Subsequent reconstruction on the site may initially be impractical as new buildings would require deeper foundations until the new fill settles. The town was considering making a memorial park in the damaged area and relocating displaced businesses to a proposed Papineau Street extension to cross the Chaudière River to Lévis Street. The new road was to be constructed in October 2013 using federal and provincial infrastructure funding, although insurance coverage for local companies to abandon contaminated sites remained uncertain. For 125 businesses, the move was expected to be permanent.

Workers at the downtown site expressed concern that cleanup efforts were being delayed by management, leaving workers often idle on-site and allowing work to proceed only at a snail's pace. The downtown was most affected; over thirty buildings destroyed by the disaster itself, with thirty-six of the thirty-nine remaining buildings slated for demolition due to contamination of the underlying soil. In December 2014, local residents were given one last chance to tour what remained of the downtown before demolition.

=== Contamination of waterways ===
The Chaudière River was contaminated by an estimated 100,000 litres (22,000 imp gal; 26,000 US gal) of oil. The spill travelled down the river and reached the town of Saint-Georges 80 km (50 miles) to the northeast, forcing local authorities to draw water from a nearby lake and install floating barriers to prevent contamination. Residents were asked to limit their water consumption as the lake was not able to supply the daily needs of the town. Swimming and fishing were prohibited in the Chaudière River, as was the use of scarce municipal water to fill swimming pools or water flower beds. Restrictions on drawing potable water from the river remained in effect two months later. A temporary system of aboveground pipes feeding water to Lévis from the Beaurivage River was expected to cost $2 million, not including any measures to protect the line against freezing in winter.

Environmentalists reported heavy contamination from polycyclic aromatic hydrocarbons and believed arsenic levels to be well above legal limits.

=== Cleanup and environmental costs ===
MMA contractors responsible for removing oil and damaged rail cars from downtown Lac-Mégantic stopped work on July 17, 2013, as the railway had not paid them. Work soon resumed under municipal (and later provincial) funding. As of July 30, 2013, the municipality was demanding MMA reimburse $7.6 million in cleanup costs. Rail World CEO Ed Burkhardt indicated "we’re unable to fund that out of our own cash, so we’re waiting for the insurance company to come forward".

On July 29, 2013, Provincial environment minister Yves-François Blanchet issued an order under the Quality of the Environment Act requiring MMA, Western Petroleum Company and its parent World Fuel Services pay the full cost of clean-up and damage assessment. Canadian Pacific Railway was added on August 14 after World Fuel Services, the shipper of the crude oil, claimed its only contractual relationship is to the MMA as Canadian Pacific Railway's subcontractor exercising sole control of the site. The claim that MMA was contracted by Canadian Pacific, and not World Fuel Services, was later drawn into question. Blanchet stated “I will leave it up to lawyers, but let's be clear: under the law on environmental quality, the minister does not ask for, or suggest, compensation ... he orders it." Canadian Pacific intends to appeal the order.

== Political impact ==
Following the accident, the MMA temporarily ceased operations on its lines between Lac-Mégantic and Jackman, Maine, effectively severing rail transport on its lines between Maine and Quebec, though rail traffic continued outside the affected area. In Quebec, MMA continued operation from Farnham with a skeleton staff after the derailment, having laid off 19 of its 75 workers without notice on July 19 and an additional five on July 30; these workers had not received severance and vacation pay owed. In Maine, 64 MMA employees were laid off as a result of the derailment.

=== Municipal reaction ===
Local governments in various communities across Canada expressed concern not only that railways are exempted from all local regulations (as they are under federal jurisdiction) but that information on the content of dangerous goods shipments was being deliberately, systematically withheld from municipal leaders whose duties include disaster planning and 9-1-1 emergency response.

On August 23, 2013, the Federation of Canadian Municipalities rail safety working group urged the Federal government to act swiftly on rail safety. The FCM working group had three recommendations:

- Help equip and support municipal first responders, and keep them informed of the type of dangerous goods being transported by rail through their communities in order to help plan for emergencies.
- Ensure federal and industry policies and regulations address municipalities' rail safety concerns and include those concerns in risk assessment and policy development on rail safety.
- Solidify the regulation of third-party liability insurance for rail companies so the costs of rail disasters are not borne by local taxpayers.

In Montmagny, a community on the CN line through Lévis, mayor Jean-Guy Desrosiers expressed concern about the 60-mile-per-hour (97 km/h) dangerous materials trains which appeared increasingly frequently after the former CP line through Lac-Mégantic was inoperable; neither the city nor police and fire responders were informed of the content of these shipments, leaving questions as to the readiness of the municipality to respond to further derailments.

Magog mayor Vicky May Hamm made an Access to Information Act enquiry for track inspection data, train scheduling information and products transported. The federal response acknowledged that inspections found three problematic track sections, but provided no further information. Sherbrooke made similar demands. While US authorities made Maine track inspection data available quickly, the Canadian government was expected to take eight months to a year to comply with the Access to Information Act enquiries.

According to the Brandon Sun, the Brandon Police Service and Brandon Fire Department indicate they are not provided dangerous goods lists by rail companies. Côte-Saint-Luc, Quebec, mayor Anthony Housefather expressed concern in a recent council meeting about the lack of data: “I'm not the federal government, I didn't determine if the railways have an obligation to provide [the information] to the municipalities or anyone else,” the mayor added. “The federal government should be doing that. I had one opportunity to get it for our city to work on our emergency measures plan and make sure that we’re prepared, and I prefer to have the information than not have it.... Until such time as the federal government adopts more stringent requirements on the railways, anything we receive as information as a city comes from the sufferance of the railway, meaning we need to have a good relationship with the railway to get anything because they have no legal obligation under federal law to provide it to us,”

Farnham's town council passed a resolution asking that the operation of a rail line that cuts the town in two be suspended until Transport Canada conducts a full inspection of the track; Farnham mayor Josef Hüsler also requested subsidies to move the rail yard outside the town and replace a level crossing at Quebec Route 104 with an overpass.

Quebec City mayor Régis Labeaume offered that city's continued support for the reconstruction effort (the city already had emergency workers on-site) and called for the immediate construction of 1–2 km of new track to reconnect Lac-Mégantic's industrial park to the railway, bypassing the damaged downtown. He praised local mayor Colette Roy-Laroche unequivocally while denouncing Rail World CEO Burkhardt as a "corporate bum" whose modus operandi of taking large dividends in profit while leaving company coffers nearly empty would allow the railway to declare bankruptcy, leaving taxpayers to foot the huge cost of rebuilding Lac-Mégantic. Quebec City also sent an expert from its museum of civilisation to identify artefacts in the wreckage which should be preserved for inclusion in a future monument, memorial park or exhibit.

Vaudreuil-Dorion mayor Guy Pilon asked that municipalities be permitted to limit the speed of trains in populated areas, as homes and schools built 50 years ago near rail lines then carrying wood, grain and cereals are now endangered by high-speed hazardous goods trains.

Dourdan, France, mayor Olivier Leglois offered condolences to the mayor of Lac-Mégantic at the request of Le Chêne et l'Érable, a Dourdan local organisation supporting the sister city link between the two towns. While Dourdan provided no immediate aid, its local government intended to support secondary efforts such as reconstruction of the town's library, which suffered nearly two and a half million dollars in damage and was a complete loss. While the local archives could not be replaced, various universities and local groups in Quebec collected books for a new Bibliothèque Mégantic.

Sister city Farmington, Maine, sent firefighters to fight the blaze, raised over $6000 in local donations in the first few days after the derailment and had local officials meet with their Méganticois counterparts to offer aid and support. Both the municipality and the Farmington library contacted their direct counterparts in other Maine municipalities to enlist their aid.

=== Provincial reaction ===
During a July 11 visit, Premier Marois criticized the rail company's response, while announcing a $60-million fund for survivor assistance and rebuilding. Ten days later, the federal government had yet to commit to any specific aid for the stricken community, despite requests from the municipality for help to rebuild damaged infrastructure and reroute the railway outside the stricken downtown.

During an annual premiers' conference, the Council of the Federation, provincial leaders called for stricter requirements for liability insurance for rail carriers, real-time information on content and location of dangerous goods trains for officials at all levels of government and a federally supported national emergency response program.

The premiers of Quebec and all four Atlantic provinces, as well as all six New England governors, called for stricter federal regulation of dangerous goods by rail in both nations.

A 2001 Quebec law (Article 8 of the Loi sur la sécurité civile) for which the corresponding regulations were never enacted was cited on August 19, 2013, by Vision Montréal, a municipal political party. Under that law, a company conducting activities or holding materials which could cause a major disaster would be required to disclose these risks to municipalities, indicating the potential damage and any contingency plans.

=== Maine and United States ===
In Maine, where oil-by-rail attracted environmental protests, the state legislature voted 91–52 for a study on transportation of crude oil through the state. The proposed study was vetoed by the state's governor and the Maine Department of Transportation (Maine DOT) had no plans to review movements of crude oil through Maine. Maine governor Paul Lepage advocated federal review of all procedures affecting rail safety on both sides of the border.

Maine's US representatives Michaud and Pingree proposed The Safe Freight Act, a federal bill requiring two-person crews on freight trains, and demanded the older DOT-111 design be replaced by sturdier cars for dangerous goods shipments.

The U.S. Federal Railroad Administration launched a full re-inspection of the 275 miles (443 km) of the Montreal, Maine and Atlantic Railway's track in Maine. A committee of local mayors representing the Quebec municipalities along the line (Lac-Mégantic, Farnham, Saint-Jean-sur-Richelieu, Sherbrooke, Magog, Sutton and Cowansville) called for a similar investigation by the government of Canada. The FRA also established an "Emergency Order establishing additional requirements for attendance and securement of certain freight trains and vehicles on mainline track or mainline siding outside of a yard or terminal" on August 2, 2013.

Maine DOT established contingency plans for local industry which used MMA's rail lines. The state contacted every Maine freight rail operator, seeking a trustee who could keep the line running should MMA cease operations.

=== Canadian federal impact ===
On July 7, Canadian Prime Minister Stephen Harper described the area as a "war zone" and claimed the federal Cabinet would have the proper authorities "to conduct a very complete investigation and act on the recommendations".

The disaster drew criticisms of federal deregulation of the rail industry in Canada. The Public Service Alliance of Canada, which represented inspectors at Transport Canada, objected to a pattern of fewer inspections, deferred maintenance of rail lines already in poor condition and an increasing number of cars on each train, going as far as to label the government of Canada as "complicit" in the disaster. Leaders of two federal opposition parties, the New Democratic Party and the Bloc Québécois, called for Parliament to examine rail safety in Canada with possible implementation of stricter regulation. The Conservative Party opposed a critical review of Transport Canada's oversight of the railways, Millions of dollars budgeted to Transport Canada for rail safety in fiscal years 2011–12 and 2012–13 remain unspent.

In Canada, federal regulation requires rail carriers carry adequate third-party liability insurance but does not legislate a specific dollar minimum in coverage. The amount of coverage is not disclosed to the public nor to municipalities along the line. MMA was insured for $25 million in liability; a second policy exists but only covers damage to MMA equipment and rolling stock.

The federal government had been subject to intense lobbying by CPR and the Railway Association of Canada prior to the disaster, with railway association lobbyists meeting with multiple federal officials “to inform about the movement of dangerous goods, including voluntary and regulatory requirements, volumes, customers and safety measures to assure them that current regulations for dangerous goods transportation are sufficient.” A similar situation exists in the US, with nearly $47 million/year in lobbying to delay safety measures such as positive train control.

The Environmental Petitions process of the federal Commissioner of the Environment and Sustainable Development is one avenue for citizen redress, whereby the Minister is required to answer within 120 days.

In December 2011, the Commissioner on Environment and Sustainable Development, a branch of the Auditor General of Canada, recommended to address weaknesses in the oversight of the transportation of dangerous goods. Deficiencies identified by the AGC in 2011 included:

- There is a lack of follow-up by Transport Canada on identified deficiencies
- Transport Canada does not know the extent to which organizations transporting dangerous goods are complying with regulations
- Transport Canada does not conduct an adequate, timely review when approving emergency response assistance plans
- Management has not acted on long-standing concerns regarding inspection and emergency plan review practices

At the time of the release of the AGC report, Transport Canada agreed to review its procedures and enhance all of its practices by April 2013.

Marie France Dagenais, director-general of the Transportation of Dangerous Goods division of Transport Canada, prioritises her job as follows: "naturally we do it in cooperation with the industry and also representatives with the U.S. government because we want uniform standards in Canada and the United States” and thus explains the five-year delay to develop standards in her department. Meanwhile, some representatives with the U.S. government were participating in drug use and sexual activity with employees from the very energy firms they were to be regulating.

However, it would appear that many of the issues raised by the audit are not new. “An internal audit identified these same concerns over five years ago. The department has yet to correct some of the key weaknesses in its regulatory oversight practices,” stated former environment commissioner Scott Vaughan in July 2013.

On August 22, 2013, a committee of the Senate of Canada reported its findings. The Energy, Environment and Natural Resources (ENEV) committee decided in November 2012 to report on energy safety issues and had input from more than 50 individuals or groups as it crossed Canada. The chair of the committee, Sen. Richard Neufeld, said that the entire committee was supportive of minimum insurance coverage: “If they can't afford their liability coverage, maybe they shouldn't be in the business.” The committee noted that "pipeline companies are subject to a minimum of $1 billion available in bonds, lines of credit, third-party guarantees and liability insurance.", and that in 2012 alone there were 118 railway accidents involving dangerous goods. The 13 recommendations of the committee include:

- The federal government should launch an arm's-length review of the railway regulatory framework, standards and industry practices.
- Transport Canada should apply appropriate minimum liability coverage thresholds to ensure rail companies have the financial capacity to cover damages caused by a major incident.
- The National Energy Board and Transport Canada should create a web portal that includes interactive maps indicating detailed information on spills and incidents for pipelines, tankers and railcars. It should include the types of product released and the cause of the incident.

Stricter safety requirements, including two-person crews and additional requirements for hand brakes, were announced in October 2014. In February 2015, the federal Minister of Transport Lisa Raitt announced a two-year phase-in of stricter liability for rail carriers, in which a Class I railway handling hazardous material could be required to carry a billion dollars in liability insurance.

In 2018, Prime Minister Justin Trudeau announced a joint federal-provincial funding of a railway bypass so the railway would avoid the town. After negotiations came to an impasse, in February 2023, the federal government took steps to begin the expropriation process.

== Litigation ==
In Canada, a class action lawsuit was filed by Daniel Larochelle (a Lac-Mégantic attorney whose office was destroyed by the derailment and fire) and a group of Canadian and US law firms on behalf of Musi-Café proprietor Yannick Gagné and one of the widowers from the disaster, Guy Ouellet. Afterwards, two more petitioners were added to the suit, Serges Jacques and Louis-Serge Parent. The suit names a long list of rail and oil companies, including Western Petroleum Company and Irving Oil:

- MMA
- Western Petroleum Company (lessee)
- Irving Oil
- Canadian Pacific Railway
- Union Tank Car Company
- Trinity Industries
- GE Capital Rail Services (lessors)

It alleged Canadian Pacific Railway "entrusted the transport of highly explosive shale liquids to a carrier with one of the poorest safety records in the industry which was operating on poorly maintained 'excepted track' that did not permit the transport of flammable or dangerous goods" and claims CP knew that MMA was insolvent and underinsured. It also targeted Union Tank Car Company, Trinity Industries and GE Capital Rail Services, claiming "non-reinforced older model DOT-111 tankers were wholly unsuitable for the transport of these highly explosive shale liquids". The lawsuit stated that the transportation of flammable and dangerous goods is limited to 10 km/hour. Canadian courts can award plaintiffs a maximum of $326,000 as compensation for non-economic damages like emotional distress.

In the US, multiple individual lawsuits were filed in Rail World's home jurisdiction of Cook County, Illinois, on behalf of various groups of next of kin. One such lawsuit filed in Cook County by Lac-Mégantic lawyer Gloriane Blais with two US lawyers (Edward Jazlowiecki in Connecticut and Mitchell Toups in Texas) listed 11 defendants, mostly North Dakota oil companies directly responsible for the train and its contents. Jazlowiecki stated that Illinois had no limit on compensation for non-economic damage like emotional distress, and that he foresaw the verdict in 24 to 36 months. Another lawsuit filed in Chicago, Illinois, on behalf of ten victims asked for over $50 million in damages.

Tafisa Canada, Canadian Pacific Railway and Western Petroleum Company also announced intent to seek damages.

In mid-July, Burkhardt indicated “Whether we can survive is a complex question. We’re trying to analyze that right now.” On August 7, hours after Quebec health minister Réjean Hébert stated that the province may sue to recover costs of its aid to victims, MMA filed for bankruptcy protection under US Chapter 11 and Canada's Companies' Creditors Arrangement Act. As many of the suits name multiple defendants, typically oil companies including World Fuel Services, the cases continued to progress despite MMA's bankruptcy filings.

A $200 million legal settlement was proposed in January 2015, but remains subject to government approval in both nations.

In November 2015, the government of Quebec sued Canadian Pacific Railway alleging it was negligent in transferring the oil train to the Montreal, Maine, and Atlantic and that it failed to take precautions that would have prevented the disaster. “CP intends to fully defend itself in court,” was the company's response.

On June 21, 2016, Lac-Mégantic Town Council decided not to pursue legal action against Canadian Pacific, citing the costs involved in doing so and that there was no guarantee of a successful outcome.

== Regulatory impact ==
On July 23, 2013, Transport Canada issued an emergency directive requiring at least two persons operate trains carrying tank cars of dangerous materials, prohibiting dangerous material trains left on the mainline unattended, requiring locomotive cabs on unattended trains be locked and reverser handles removed to prevent the train being put into gear, imposing requirements for setting hand brakes on trains unattended for more than an hour and requiring both the automatic brake (train brake) and independent brake (locomotive brake) be applied at their maximum force for trains unattended for an hour or less. A ministerial emergency directive remains in effect for six months, although it can be renewed.

The United States Federal Railroad Administration (FRA) issued a number of emergency orders on August 2, 2013, to all railroad operating companies in the country. The orders include a requirement for railroad companies to develop and submit to the FRA a plan to notify the agency when trains carrying hazardous materials will be left unattended as well as processes to secure the trains in their positions and to ensure that the locomotive doors are locked. Before leaving a train unattended, railroad crews needed to notify dispatchers of the number of hand brakes being applied on the train along with the number of cars, the train length, the grade of the track on which the train is parked and the current weather conditions.

The Federal Railroad Administration investigated multiple safety issues with crude oil shipments, which were the fastest-growing hazardous material shipments by rail. On July 29, the FRA requested American Petroleum Institute members provide data on content of their crude shipments and crude oil loading practices and proposed to do its own testing if the data were not made available. The U.S. Department of Transportation's Pipeline and Hazardous Materials Safety Administration launched a 'Bakken blitz' of inspections of North Dakota oil trains in August 2013, citing ongoing concerns about improper identification of the chemical composition and flash point of flammable cargo.

According to the FRA, chemical composition of the oil is not being properly identified on shipping manifests, despite the use of corrosive or volatile chemicals in the fracking process. Content of blended crude from multiple wells is not tested before loading, even though FRA indicates that “it is critical that shippers determine the proper classification of the crude oil” as a tanker with a higher safety classification (and not the standard DOT-111A car) is required for corrosive or explosive materials. The information is needed for provision to first responders and emergency services during a disaster.

In an increasing number of incidents, chemicals such as hydrochloric acid (used to release crude from oil well rock formations) corroded tanks, covers, valves and fittings. As unit trains of tanker cars did not pass over weigh-in-motion scales in classification yards, many were overloaded, increasing risks of leakage as oil expands with temperature. The result was twice the number of leaks from crude oil shipments as from alcohol shipments, the next highest hazardous material, even though comparable volumes of each travel by rail.

In January 2014, Canada's Transportation Safety Board recommended that DOT-111 / CTC-111A oil-by-rail cars built before October 2011 be replaced with the newer, reinforced design. It also recommended carriers perform route planning and analysis and advocated mandated emergency response plans. While TSB set no clear deadlines, Irving Oil plans to replace the remainder of its own fleet of DOT-111's by the end of April 2014 and ask its suppliers to modernise by the year's end.

In February 2014, the US Federal Railroad Administration placed crude oil under the most protective two sets of hazardous materials shipping requirements and issued an order requiring tests of crude oil before shipment by rail.

In April 2014, the Canadian government required a phaseout or retrofit of the older DOT-111 oil-by-rail cars on a three-year deadline and mandated emergency response plans for all oil shipments by rail.

== Rebuilding efforts ==
A new group of four 15,000 square feet (1,400 m^{2}) commercial buildings was built to accommodate some displaced businesses on a new site near the sports centre. In August 2013, consultants began surveying the site of a new bridge across the Chaudière River from Papineau Street to Lévis Street, to serve the new commercial district. New rail track reconnected the local industrial park to the Montreal line in November 2013. Private residences were expropriated to make way for redevelopment in Fatima.

Students at Laval University, Université de Montréal, and Université de Sherbrooke collected tens of thousands of books for a new library. Libraries in other Quebec communities solicited book donations and searched local archives for information on Mégantic's history. The new library, which had received 100,000 donated volumes (some of them duplicates) by September 2013, opened on May 5, 2014, as La Médiathèque municipale Nelly-Arcan in honour of an author born in the town.

A temporary "Musi-Café d'été" hosted numerous Quebec musicians, including Marie-Mai, Louis-Jean Cormier, Karim Ouellet, Vincent Vallières, Michel Rivard, Dan Bigras, Richard Desjardins, Claude Dubois, Paul Piché and Fred Pellerin, in a series of free benefit concerts in a 150-seat tent from August 2 until mid-September 2013, raising money for local rebuilding efforts. A new Musi-Café opened in a $1.6 million building at the foot of the new Papineau Street bridge on December 15, 2014.

Métro opened its new Métro Plus Lac-Mégantic grocery store on October 15, 2014. After 2014 Dollarama reopened across from Centre sportif Mégantic and Subway reopened in one of the new buildings on Papineau Street and Jean Coutu was operating from reduced, temporary facilities until a new location can be built in Fatima, but now located at rue Salaberry and rue Cliche.

Local demands to re-route the track around the town also remain unaddressed. In 2023, federal transport minister Pablo Rodriguez announced the commencement of preliminary work on a bypass.

== Media ==
In 2018, writer Anne-Marie Saint-Cerny published the book Mégantic: Une tragédie annoncée, an examination of the disaster. The book was a shortlisted finalist for the Governor General's Award for French-language non-fiction at the 2018 Governor General's Awards.

Also in 2018, Bruce Campbell published the book The Lac-Mégantic Rail Disaster: Public Betrayal, Justice Denied. For his work on Lac-Mégantic, Campbell was awarded a Law Foundation of Ontario Community Leadership in Justice Fellowship.

In 2019, journalist Justin Mikulka published his book, Bomb Trains: How Industry Greed and Regulatory Failure Put the Public at Risk, which looked at the disaster and its economic and regulatory context.

Mégantic, a television series directed by Alexis Durand-Brault and written by Sylvain Guy about the disaster, premiered on Club Illico in February 2023. In April, Philippe Falardeau's documentary series Lac-Mégantic: This Is Not an Accident premiered at the Canneseries festival in advance of its television premiere in May on Vidéotron's Vrai streaming platform.

== See also ==
- Dark territory
- List of rail accidents in Canada
- List of rail accidents (2010–2019)
- Similar rail accidents:
  - Chester General rail crash, United Kingdom, 1972: brakes failed on train transporting fuel, derailed and caught fire
  - 1989 Helena train wreck, Montana, United States: uncoupled train with brake failure rolled 14 kilometres (8.7 mi) from a mountain pass into town, where it collided with another train and its flammable cargo exploded, damaging buildings and infrastructure
  - Nishapur train disaster, Iran, 2004: train with highly flammable cargo derailed, explosion destroyed village
  - Viareggio train derailment, Italy, 2009: train transporting LPG derailed and exploded in an urban area
  - East Palestine, Ohio, train derailment, February 2023: a train transporting similarly hazardous cargo derailed in the United States. Train operator Norfolk Southern was similarly accused of violating safety regulations, and prioritizing cost over safety.
