= Montreal, Maine and Atlantic Railway =

Former freight railroad in North America

Overview
- Headquarters: Hermon, Maine
- Reporting mark: MMA
- Locale: Maine, Vermont, and Quebec
- Dates of operation: 2002–2014
- Predecessor: Iron Road Railways
- Successor: Central Maine & Quebec Railway

Technical
- Track gauge: 4 ft 8 1/2 in (1,435 mm) standard gauge
- Length: 510 miles (820 km)

The Montreal, Maine and Atlantic Railway (reporting mark MMA) was a Class II freight railroad that operated in the U.S. states of Maine and Vermont and the Canadian province of Quebec between 2002 and 2014. It was headquartered in Hermon, Maine.

Its Canadian subsidiary was named the Montreal, Maine and Atlantic Canada Company with offices in Farnham, Quebec. With the exception of an independently owned low-speed tourist train (the Orford Express) on one small segment between Magog and Sherbrooke, there was no passenger service on the MMA system.

MMA and its Canadian subsidiary entered Chapter 11/CCAA bankruptcy protection in August 2013 as a direct result of the Lac-Mégantic rail disaster, a runaway train incident in July 2013 which resulted in an estimated $200 million in damage and the deaths of 47 people.

MMA's assets were sold at auction to Railroad Acquisition Holdings, LLC, a subsidiary of Fortress Investment Group, LLC on January 21, 2014. Fifteen locomotives worth $1.6 million were excluded from the deal and will be sold separately. The sale was approved by bankruptcy judges on January 23, with the transfer of assets expected to occur on or before March 31, 2014. Railroad Acquisition Holdings, LLC has established a new railroad named Central Maine and Quebec Railway (reporting mark CMQ) to operate the former MMA rail lines. The CM&Q was acquired by Canadian Pacific Railway in June 2020.

== History ==
=== 2003 Assets acquired ===
MMA was formed in October 2002. The railway was 72.8% owned by Rail World ($54.7 million) and 12.8% by Caisse de dépôt et placement du Québec ($7 million) with the remaining minority stakes held by fifteen other private investors.

MMA purchased the assets arising out of the 2002 bankruptcy of the holding company Iron Road Railways. Iron Road Railways owned the following subsidiaries at the time of its bankruptcy:

- Bangor & Aroostook Railroad (reporting mark BAR)
- Canadian American Railroad (reporting mark CDAC)
- Northern Vermont Railroad
- Quebec Southern Railway
- Van Buren Bridge and Construction Company (VBB)

Closing of the sale by the trustee for Iron Road Railways took place in January 2003 and MMA began operations over 745 mi (1,199 km) of track. An average of 25 trains were operating each day and the company employed roughly 350 people at that time. MMA's logo design was based on that of Bangor and Aroostook Railroad.

=== 2003-2010 Cost-cutting ===
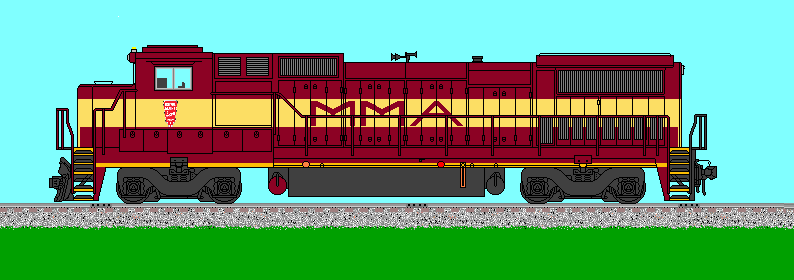
The MMA's livery, one of the rarest liveries for a railroad. Only 2 locomotives were painted into this livery.

Almost immediately after MMA began operations, two of the railway's largest customers, a pair of Great Northern Paper mills in Millinocket and East Millinocket, declared bankruptcy and shut down.

MMA responded by reducing its workforce to 275 employees and cut salaries by 40 percent. The decline of the pulp and paper industry as well as the lumber industry, which originally represented 60% of the railway's traffic base, had rendered a company worth $60 million in 2003 effectively worthless. Accountants from the la Caisse de dépôt et placement du Québec wrote that company's investment in MMA down to a nominal $1000 from 2008 onward. MMA laid off additional workers in 2006 and in 2008 as the company struggled to become profitable.

In the spring of 2010, MMA cut train crews from two workers to one, installing remote control and cutting the total workforce to 175 people (down from twice that number in 2006). These steps were estimated to save $4.5 million annually in wages. Later that year, it sold the northern 233 miles (375 km) of the former BAR line to the state; this track was in very poor condition but its sale brought $20 million, $7 million of which was used to repay a 2003 loan from la Caisse de dépôt et placement du Québec, an MMA stockholder. MMA was the only Maine railway to use a single-person crew and a remote-control device instead of the more common two-person crews.

Largely due to the lack of money for track maintenance and equipment, adverse winter weather conditions, and possibly the practice of running with single person crews, from 2003 to 2013 MMA recorded an accident rate of 36.1 accidents per million miles travelled, versus a national average of 14.6/million miles traveled for all of North America, according to data from the Federal Railroad Administration.

Freight volumes continued to drop as manufacturers, needing to meet customer demands for smaller quantity just in time delivery in order to reduce inventories, began to prefer trucking firms as faster and more reliable than MMA.

=== 2008 Eastern Townships passenger proposal ===
A 2008 proposal to return passenger train service to the Eastern Townships on the 150 kilometres (93 mi) route between Montréal and Sherbrooke was studied but never implemented. The MMA-owned section of the line from St-Jean-sur-Richelieu to Sherbrooke would have required costly upgrades to tracks and bridges in order handle Via Rail passenger trains operating at 110 kilometres per hour (68 mph).

=== 2011 Twin Rivers Paper dispute ===
In 2011, the Twin Rivers Paper Company of Madawaska, Maine, the largest customer on the former BAR line, intervened in a United States District Court lawsuit which sought to allow the company to deal directly with Canadian National Railway (reporting mark CN) after years of problems with what it described as "MMA's exorbitant pricing structure, ineffective service, and annoying executives." MMA was charging more to haul rail cars 24 miles (39 km) from Madawaska, ME to the interchange point with CN at St. Leonard, NB than CN demanded to carry this freight onward to Montreal, Quebec. MMA's service and business practices had been subject to ongoing complaints from Fraser Papers Inc. and its successor Twin Rivers Paper Co. about missed pickup and delivery deadlines as well as poor track maintenance.

Upon failing to break free from MMA's local monopoly through legal action, Twin Rivers Paper Co. resorted to transshipment of its entire output across the Canada–United States border to Edmundston, New Brunswick by truck for placement directly on CN trains.

=== 2010 Northern Maine abandonment ===
In early February, 2010, the MMA filed a notice of intent with the Surface Transportation Board that it intended to abandon 233 miles (375 km) of track in northern Maine, between Madawaska and Millinocket, part of the original Bangor & Aroostook Railroad's main line bought by MMA in 2003. Many portions of this track were in such poor condition that freight could only safely run at 10 miles per hour (16 km/h).

Affected lines were located in Penobscot County and Aroostook County, Maine, and included track serving Houlton, Presque Isle, Caribou and Fort Kent. MMA lines between Millinocket and Montreal, Brownville and Searsport, and Madawaska to Van Buren were not included in this application.

According to MMA, losses from operating the lines had reached the point where they were threatening the financial health of the entire railroad. The STB subsequently postponed action on the request in late April, after the railroad and Maine officials agreed to negotiate to prevent the lines from being abandoned, which the state said could negatively affect the economy of the area. State legislators proposed that the state buy the lines and contract out freight rail service, similar to lines in Vermont.

On October 20, 2010, the railroad reached an agreement to sell 233 miles (375 km) of track in the northern part of Maine to the state government for $20.1 million; The Surface Transportation Board approved MM&A's abandonment of the tracks on December 28, 2010, allowing the state to purchase them. Maine awarded a state contract to operate the line to J.D. Irving Limited subsidiary Irving Transportation Services on April 5, 2011 and completed $10.5 million worth of federally subsidised repairs to the long-neglected line in 2011-2012, including replacement of 50,000 ties and portions of the stone rail bed.

Irving Transportation Services, which owns and operates New Brunswick Railway Company (and subsidiaries New Brunswick Southern Railway / Eastern Maine Railway) established a new subsidiary Maine Northern Railway in June 2011 to operate the line, hiring an additional thirty workers and acquiring additional locomotives and rolling stock. In December 2011, the MMA agreed to sell the remaining 25 miles (40 km) of track between Madawaska, Maine and Van Buren, Maine, MMA's last track in northern Maine, to Irving outright.

The red ink continued to flow; in 2011, MMA was losing four to five million dollars a year. An attempt to sell the entire MM&A operation in 2011 failed as US government loans provided to the railway were not transferable to a subsequent buyer.

=== 2012 Sainte-Rosalie abandonment ===
MMA suspended freight service on July 16, 2012 over the Ste Rosalie Subdivision without prior notice to its customers. This 38 kilometres (24 mi) rail line connecting the MMA main line at Farnham, Quebec north to Sainte-Rosalie in the Montérégie region of Québec was inspected in May 2012 by Transport Canada and was deemed to be non-compliant with recently updated "Rules Respecting Track Safety" implemented by Transport Canada. The non-compliance was due to ongoing cost-cutting by MMA which resulted in deferred maintenance to the track between 2002 and 2012. MMA claimed the new "Rules Respecting Track Safety" was a force majeure and sufficient reason to terminate train operations without first complying with Section 140 of the Canada Transportation Act detailing requirements for "Transferring and Discontinuing the Operation of Railway Lines". The CTA legislation states that railway companies must give one year advance notice.

Two local clients affected by MMA's suspension of service, F. Ménard Inc. and Meunerie Côté-Paquet, have since initiated lawsuits against the railway.

In 2013 MMA attempted to abandon the right of way and sell it to local municipalities. Because of the poor condition of the tracks on this section, if the sale were successful, the rails would likely be removed and the property converted to a rail trail.

=== 2012 Oil shipments ===
The MMA had been constantly struggling financially since it was formed in 2002 due to economic problems facing its primary customers in the forestry industry. The forestry industry in Maine and Quebec fared poorly in the Great Recession of 2008-2010 and in 2010, MMA cut its workforce dramatically and sold hundreds of miles of track in northern Maine to control operating costs and manage its debt. The company's fortunes began to change in 2012 when MMA embraced oil-by-rail as a path to profitability. Transporting oil allowed it to re-hire laid-off workers and purchase additional locomotives (rebuilt General Electric C39-8s originally constructed in 1986). The oil being transported over MMA was destined for Saint John, New Brunswick's Irving Oil Refinery. By early 2013, environmental groups and Maine state officials were expressing concern about the increasing amounts of crude oil on both the MMA and its rival Pan Am Railways in the wake of a string of minor derailments on both railroads. According to Maine Department of Environmental Protection director Scott Whittier, "The transportation of crude oil across rail lines is a concern because many times, rail lines are very close to sensitive water bodies, so it does present a potential threat that we need to prepare for."

In a March 2013 Associated Press interview, MMA chief executive Robert Grindrod dismissed these concerns, stating "The statistics tell you how much has been transported, but to the best of my knowledge, there hasn't been any spilled or released,".

=== 2013 Frontenac fuel spill ===
On June 11, 2013 an MMA locomotive spilled 13,000 litres (2,900 imp gal; 3,400 US gal) of diesel oil from its fuel tank at Frontenac (approximately 5 kilometres (3.1 mi) east of Lac-Mégantic, Quebec) after the tank was perforated while using a switch.

=== 2013 Lac-Mégantic disaster ===
On July 6, 2013, train MMA 2, which was made up of C30-7 5017, a VB Remote Control Caboose, C30-7 5026, CITX SD40-2 3053, C30-7 5023, CEFX SD40-2 3166, a boxcar being used as a buffer car and 72 DOT-111 cars carrying crude petroleum products derailed in the centre of Lac-Mégantic, Quebec. The runaway train, without anyone at the controls after a stop at Nantes for a crew change, derailed at approximately 1:20 AM, and four of its cars exploded. The city's downtown core suffered catastrophic damage, with many businesses and residential properties completely destroyed. Many of the residents lost their homes or jobs; 47 people are presumed dead in the deadliest Canadian rail disaster since the St-Hilaire train disaster in 1864. The locomotives separated from the cars before they could derail.

Rail World president and CEO Edward Burkhardt first visited Lac-Mégantic after the accident on 10 July 2013, and was heckled by residents. After the accident the railway's safety record was called into question. The train had been left unattended and improperly secured overnight on the mainline, with one locomotive running, on a -0.92% grade leading 18 kilometres (11 mi) from Nantes, Quebec downhill to a 10 miles per hour (16 km/h) curve where the line entered downtown Lac-Mégantic. By then the track had fallen 360 ft over 7.2 miles. The railway air brakes appear to have released after a local fire brigade shut down the locomotive to extinguish a fire in the engine, allowing the oil-laden cars to roll downhill into the town as an insufficient number of hand brakes had been applied to hold the train.

Burkhardt refused to publicly disclose the amount of liability insurance but acknowledged in mid-July "Whether we can survive is a complex question. We're trying to analyze that right now." Questions were also raised about the condition of the line; on July 11 a Magog newspaper reported one in ten railroad ties to be rotten with many spikes loose enough to be removed by hand.

Following the accident, the MMA ceased operations on its lines between Lac-Mégantic and Jackman, Maine, effectively severing rail transport on its lines between Maine and Quebec, though rail traffic continued outside the affected area. In Quebec, MMA had continued operation from Farnham with a skeleton staff after the derailment, having laid off 24 Canadian employees and 64 workers in Maine in July 2013 as the line remained blocked by wreckage at Lac-Mégantic. MMA aggregate gross revenue dropped by two thirds, leaving $1 million/month in revenue on the broken line. According to CEO Burkhardt, "This may cost us our company. This may cost us our investment, cost the employees their jobs, the customers in Quebec, in Maine their rail service."

On July 30, 2013, the Maine Department of Transportation established contingency plans for MMA's rail clients, contacting every Maine freight railroad to find an operator to carry local factory freight should MMA completely cease operation. These plans were developed due in part to US federal law, which requires that a trustee step in to keep a bankrupt rail line operating until a buyer is found, due to the railway's status as a monopoly in many communities.

On August 6, 2013, Burkhardt stated that MMA has no further plans to carry oil by rail.

=== 2013 Financial difficulties and bankruptcy ===
Following the tragedy, parent company Rail World faced hundreds of millions of dollars in lawsuits and environmental cleanup costs due to the destruction of downtown Lac-Mégantic. It is unclear how much of the disaster's cost was paid by liability insurance; laid-off MMA workers reported problems obtaining the severance pay owed them and cheques to suppliers were rejected due to non-sufficient funds.

On August 7, 2013, the company filed for bankruptcy protection in both the Quebec Superior Court in Montreal (under the Companies' Creditors Arrangement Act) and the United States Bankruptcy Court in Bangor, Maine (under Chapter 11). According to Burkhardt, the financial obligations of both US and Canadian subsidiaries "now exceed the value of their assets, including prospective insurance recoveries, as a direct result of the tragic derailment at Lac-Megantic. A process under Chapter 11 and the CCAA is the best way to ensure fairness of treatment to all in these tragic circumstances."

MMA had $50–100 million in US assets and less than $18 million in Canadian assets, including the track itself. It owed $27.5 million on a 2005 Federal Railroad Administration loan, $6 million on a 2009 line of credit issued by the Wheeling and Lake Erie Railway and $3.5 million to various other creditors and tax authorities. J.D. Irving, as owner of NBM Railways, is one of MMA Canada's largest unsecured creditors at $2.35 million. The total cost of the Lac-Mégantic derailment exceeded $200 million; MMA had $25 million in liability insurance and $274,000 in its bank accounts at the time of bankruptcy filing. Eighty-five MM&A employees remained on duty after the bankruptcy filing to provide service to all stations on the line except Lac-Mégantic, where all tracks remained blocked since the July 6 derailment and fire. Fifteen of those workers were laid off on August 20.

On August 13, 2013, the Canadian Transportation Agency announced it planned to revoke the MMA's certificate of fitness effective August 20, 2013, citing inadequate liability insurance; this effectively would have banned the MM&A from operating in Canada. The August 20 date was later extended until February 1 and subsequently to April 1. Since the insurance policy's franchise provided no coverage for liability claims under a quarter-million dollars, the Québec Superior Court would set aside this sum in MMA's bankruptcy as available to victims of a future disaster involving MMA.

On September 12, Transport Canada shut down part of the MMA line after an inspection of six track segments found substandard rail conditions which included a concentration of defective ties on a section near a propane storage facility. A failed October 11 inspection led Transport Canada to embargo the entire line between Lennoxville and Lac-Mégantic. Orford Express, a special tourist train which used MM&A lines between Magog and Sherbrooke, carried $50–100 million in liability insurance independently of MMA and planned to continue its regular service. A planned special train to carry 5000 visitors from Sherbrooke to Lac-Mégantic between Thanksgiving and Halloween 2013, however, was scrapped as the embargo between Lennoxville and Lac-Mégantic forced Orford Express passengers to travel to Lennoxville and Lac-Mégantic via bus from Sherbrooke.

On December 18, 2013, the rail line from Sherbrooke was reopened through Lac-Mégantic with numerous restrictions, such as a prohibition on transport of dangerous cargo; a train's manifest being released no less than four hours ahead; no parking on tracks within 4 km (2 mi) of the town centre; a conductor and engineer must both be on board; and a train's speed must not exceed 16 km/h (10 mph). The first test train carrying particle board from the local Tafisa factory to Sherbrooke rolled through the town centre. There were plans to reroute the tracks outside the town by changing the track's route between Nantes and Frontenac; however, no time table was ever set.

=== 2014 sale ===
MMA's assets were sold at auction to Railroad Acquisition Holdings, LLC, a subsidiary of the Fortress Investment Group, LLC, in January 2014 in an attempt to keep the line open as a going concern. That group's initial bid for US$14.25 million, placed in December 2013, was the only to offer to buy the entire MMA system. The terms of the sale were announced in mid-February 2014 when the new railroad named Central Maine and Quebec Railway (reporting mark CMQ) was registered in the United States and Canada. The sale was finalized in March 2014.

A joint bid from J.D. Irving Inc.'s Eastern Maine Railway and Pan-Am's Springfield Terminal Railway offered $8 million for just the Maine portions of the line; the Washington County Railroad offered $750,000 for just the line to Newport.

A few hours after court approval of the sale, Great Northern Paper announced a 16-week closure of its mill in East Millinocket. On January 30, trustees filed a US lawsuit on behalf of the bankrupt railway, alleging that World Fuel Services was negligent in failing to properly label the train's dangerous cargo and that, had its true volatility and inflammability been honestly disclosed on shipping documents, MMA procedures would have prevented it being left unattended on a main rail line.

On May 12, 2014 the Montreal, Maine and Atlantic Railway was charged with 47 counts of criminal negligence; engineer Thomas Harding, manager of train operations Jean DeMaître and rail traffic controller Richard Labrie were arrested and will appear in Lac-Mégantic's court.

Before the derailment, MMA employed 179.

== Interchange points ==
B&M/PAR

- Newport, Vermont (via WACR)

CN

- Saint John, NB (via NBSR/EMR)
- Sherbrooke, QC (via SLQ)
- St. Jean, QC
- St. Leonard, NB (via MNR)
- Ste. Rosalie, QC

CP

- St. Jean, QC

CCR

- Newport, Vermont (via WACR)

EMR/NBSR

- Brownville Jct., ME

MNR

- Millinocket, ME

NECR

- Newport, VT (via WACR)

QCR (defunct)

- Sherbrooke, QC

MEC/PAR

- Mattawamkeag, ME (via NBSR/EMR)
- Northern Maine Jct., ME

SLQ/SLA

- Lennoxville, QC

WACR

- Newport, VT

== See also ==
- List of Canadian railways
