= Orford Express =

Tourist train in Quebec, Canada

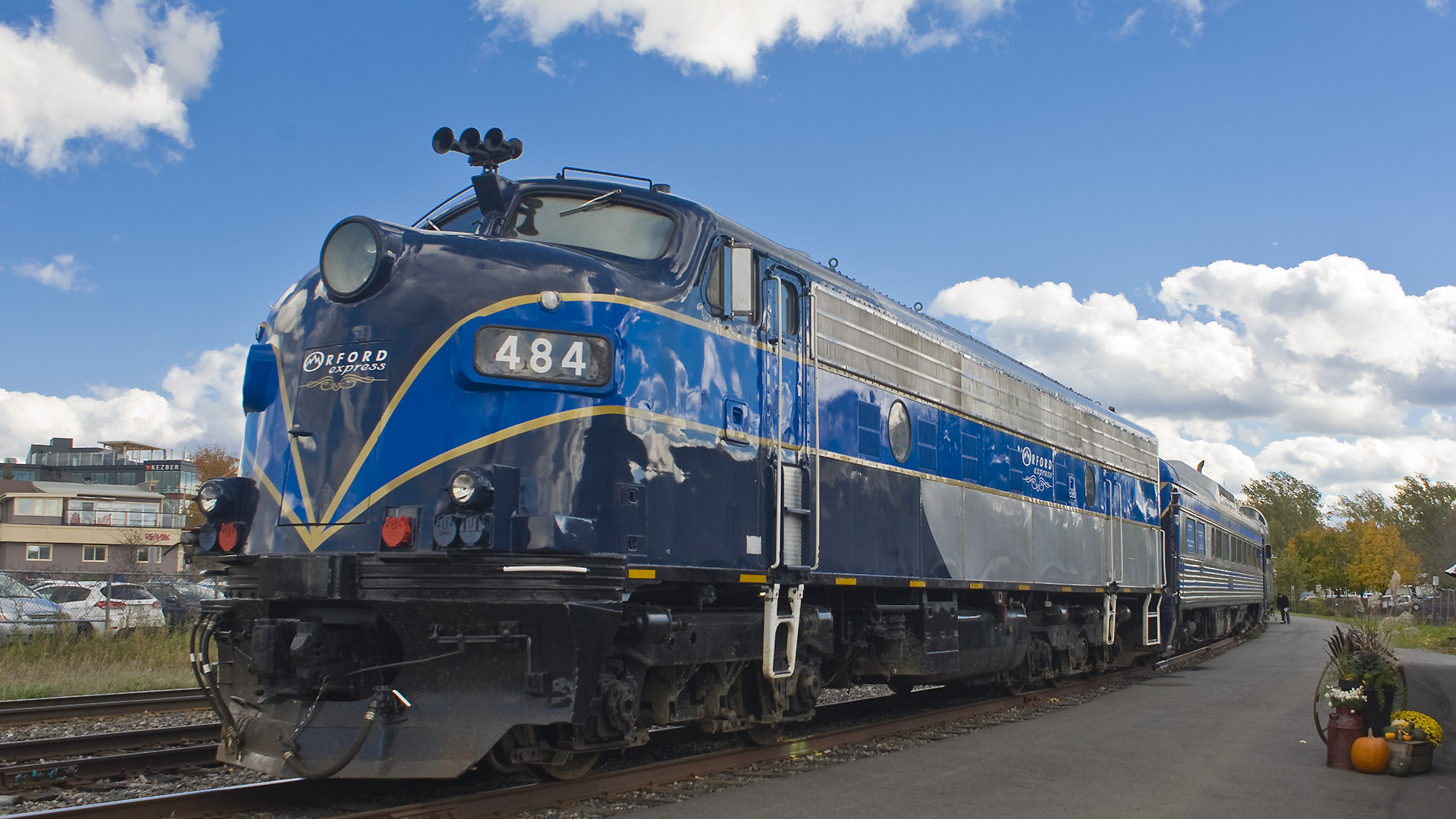
- Orford Express tourist train EMD FL-9 locomotive in Magog, Québec.
- Terminus: Sherbrooke, Quebec

Preservation history
- 2006: Established
- 2020: Ceased operations

The Orford Express was a tourist train between Magog and Sherbrooke, Quebec, operating seasonally on the former Montreal, Maine and Atlantic Railway line through Quebec's Eastern Townships. A dinner train which operated from early May to end-December, it was owned and operated separately from the underlying tracks.

== History ==
The rail line through Farnham, Sherbrooke and Lac-Mégantic originally continued as the International Railway of Maine, part of the Canadian Pacific Railway system, through Brownville Junction, Maine, to Saint John, New Brunswick. Built in the 1880s, the CPR abandoned this line to the first in a series of short-line operators in 1994. Subsequent owners of the underlying line include Iron Road Railways (bankrupt 2002), Montreal, Maine and Atlantic Railway (bankrupt 2013), the Central Maine and Quebec Railway, and now finally back to Canadian Pacific.

VIA Rail formerly provided Atlantic passenger train service on this line, but abandoned the route when the tracks were sold in 1994.

A long history of deferred maintenance under various short-line operators caused the tracks to deteriorate, necessitating speed reductions on much of the line.

The Orford Express, launched in 2006, covered one small portion of the route (Eastman to Magog and Sherbrooke) seasonally, at low speed using its own trains (owned and insured separately from the underlying freight short lines) with tourist panorama cars. The train ran from May to December, with special runs during the holiday season between Christmas and New Year's Eve. There were two dining cars and seating for 140 passengers.

On October 8, 2020, the owners, PAL+, announced that they had made the decision to cease operations of the Orford Express tourist train. The train had been inactive for the previous few months due to the COVID-19 pandemic.

== Operational setbacks ==
On July 6, 2013, an unattended 74-car freight train carrying Bakken Formation crude oil rolled down a 1.2% grade from Nantes and derailed in downtown Lac-Mégantic, resulting in the fire and explosion of multiple tank cars and the confirmed death of forty-two people and five more missing and presumed dead.

On October 11, 2013, Transport Canada imposed an embargo on the line between Lennoxville and Lac-Mégantic due to poor track conditions, necessitating cancellation of a planned special train to Lac-Mégantic, Quebec, which was to have run from Thanksgiving to Halloween.

On April 25, 2014, the service was cancelled for the season due to accidental fire damage to one of the panorama cars. The season was to have started May 7.

Regular operation of the tourist train resumed in 2016.

On October 8, 2020, it was announced that operations would permanently cease. The train had not operated for a number of months before that due to the COVID-19 pandemic.

== See also ==
- Budd Rail Diesel Car
- Dome car
- EMD FL9
