= Northern Vermont Railroad =

Former class III railroad that operated in Vermont

Overview
- Parent company: Iron Road Railways: Canadian American Railroad
- Headquarters: Newport, Vermont
- Reporting mark: NVR
- Locale: Vermont
- Dates of operation: 1996–2002
- Predecessor: CP Rail Lyndonville Subdivision; B&M Wells River Subdivision
- Successor: Montreal, Maine & Atlantic Railway; Washington County Railroad (from 2003)

Technical
- Track gauge: 4 ft 8 1/2 in (1,435 mm) standard gauge
- Length: 86 miles (138 km)

The Northern Vermont Railroad (officially the Northern Vermont Railroad Company Incorporated; reporting mark NVR) was a former class III railroad that operated in Vermont from 1996 to 2002. NVR was based in Newport, Vermont.

The Northern Vermont Railroad was created by holding company Iron Road Railways on and began operations on 28 September 1996 on the former Canadian Pacific Railway's Lyndonville Subdivision and the Boston and Maine Railroad's former Wells River Subdivision.

The company had no employees, and trackage rights on the system (with 86 miles (138 km) all in Vermont) were owned by Canadian American Railroad.

Iron Road ceased operations in late 2002 and NVR was merged along with Canadian American Railroad, Bangor and Aroostook Railroad and Quebec Southern Railway to form Montreal, Maine and Atlantic Railway, which also went bankrupt following the Lac-Mégantic disaster. The Central Maine and Quebec Railway (CMQ) was formed as the successor to the MM&A, resuming operations in 2016; CMQ would be acquired by Canadian Pacific in 2019, thus bringing back some of the former CP lines into its system.

Service on NVR routes was resumed by the Washington County Railroad in 2003.

== Rolling Stock ==
NVR operated a handful of locomotives, boxcars and snowplows

- 3 EMD GP35U
- numerous Pullman-Standard 50' boxcars
- 1 ex-Canadian Pacific Railway snowplow - likely built at CP Angus Shops
