= D&W =

D&W may refer to:

- D&W Fresh Market, an American grocery store chain
- D&W Railroad, a shortline railroad in Iowa, U.S.
- Darien and Western Railroad, a railroad in Georgia, U.S., 1894–1906
- Deadpool & Wolverine, a 2024 superhero film by Marvel Studios

== See also ==
- D. and W. Henderson and Company, a Scottish marine engineering and shipbuilding company, 1872–1936
- Dash and Will, an Australian indie pop/pop rock duo
- Demons and Wizards (disambiguation)
- Dundas & Wilson, a UK commercial law firm
