= Washington County Railroad (1980) =

Railroad part of the Vermont rail system

Overview
- Headquarters: Burlington, Vermont
- Reporting mark: WACR
- Locale: Vermont, New Hampshire
- Dates of operation: 1980–present

Technical
- Track gauge: 4 ft 8 1/2 in (1,435 mm) standard gauge
- Length: 14 mi (23 km)

The Washington County Railroad (reporting mark WACR) is a shortline railroad operating in Vermont and a sliver of New Hampshire, forming part of the Vermont Rail System. The WACR began operating in 1980 over the old Montpelier and Barre Railroad in Washington County, which the state acquired to ensure the continuance of rail service, and ceased operations in early 1999. Later that year, after interim service by other companies, operations were transferred to a new WACR subsidiary of the Vermont Rail System. In 2003, operations were greatly expanded through acquisition by the state and operation by the WACR of a former Boston and Maine Corporation and Canadian Pacific Railway line between Newport and White River Junction, which had most recently been operated by subsidiaries of the bankrupt Bangor and Aroostook Railroad.

The original line, now known as the Granite District, connects the New England Central Railroad (NECR) with Montpelier, Barre, Websterville, and Graniteville. Its primary commodities have been lumber, granite, and silicon carbide since the Bombardier transit car plant in Barre was closed in 2002. The Connecticut River Division includes haulage rights from White River Junction south to Bellows Falls on the NECR, where it connects to the affiliated Green Mountain Railroad. It also has direct connections to the former Montreal, Maine and Atlantic Railway at Newport and Pan Am Railways at White River Junction.

== History ==
=== Granite District ===
The majority of the Granite District was part of the Boston and Maine Railroad (B&M) system until 1926, when the Barre and Chelsea Railroad (Barre to Graniteville) and Montpelier and Wells River Railroad (Barre and Montpelier to Wells River) were sold to local interests. The latter was consolidated into the former in January 1945, but in 1957 the entire Barre and Chelsea Railroad was abandoned. The Montpelier and Barre Railroad took over operations of the Montpelier and Barre-area trackage, but the line east to Wells River was abandoned. In 1980 that company abandoned its trackage, and the state bought it in November and designated the new CSF Acquisition, Inc. subsidiary Washington County Railroad to operate it. The WACR assigned its lease to the New England Central Railroad in February 1999, but that company ceased operating the lines in September, and the Vermont Railway took over temporarily until its new affiliate began under the Washington County Railroad name.

In early May 2010, after having been mostly dormant for some time, an official from the Barre government said that a contract for shipments of scrap granite bound for Florida would begin late the same month. Ten-car trains were planned to operate twice a day between Berlin and Montpelier Junction, as well as separate five-car trains from the granite quarries and Barre. The trains were to operate for the three months it would take for the 54,000 tons of granite the contract requested to be moved south. Further traffic of scrap granite was also considered possible, as further contracts for the material, of which 40 million tons was accessible, were being sought, and industries along the line had expressed interest in having rail service if the line was upgraded for granite shipments.

=== Connecticut River Division ===
The Connecticut River Division was built by the Connecticut and Passumpsic Rivers Railroad, a predecessor of the B&M which completed its line from White River Junction to Newport in October 1863 and to the Canada–US border in May 1867. In June 1926, the Canadian Pacific Railway leased the line between Wells River and Newport, and its lessor Quebec Central Railway leased the line north of Newport (including the connecting Massawippi Valley Railway to Sherbrooke). The Newport and Richford Railroad acquired the former portion in November 1946, continuing the lease to the CP. (The B&M retained operations south of Wells River.) Iron Road Railways subsidiary Canadian American Railroad, through the newly created Quebec Southern Railway and Northern Vermont Railroad, took over operations of the portion north of Wells River in September 1996, and in 1999 the state acquired the remainder from the B&M, contracting first the Green Mountain Railroad and then in 2000 the Northern Vermont Railroad to operate it. After Iron Road Railways went bankrupt (CDAC, B&A, QS/NV) in fall 2002, it sold most of its lines to Rail World which organized them under a newly formed subsidiary, the Montreal, Maine & Atlantic Railway. However, the segment between Newport and White River Junction was not included in the transaction and instead was acquired by the state of Vermont which contracted freight service to the Washington County Railroad. Both companies began operating their new lines in January 2003.

WACR had made a $750000 bid in January 2014 to acquire the former MM&A line from Newport northwest toward Farnham, Quebec, but was not successful as officials handling MMA's bankruptcy chose to auction the entire system to Fortress Investment Group as one undivided block.
