= Central Maine & Quebec Railway =

Freight railroad operating in Canada and the USA

Central Maine & Québec Railway

Overview
- Headquarters: Bangor, Maine
- Reporting mark: CMQ, VB, BAR, MMA
- Locale: Maine, Vermont, Quebec
- Dates of operation: 2014–June 4, 2020
- Predecessor: Montreal, Maine & Atlantic Railway
- Successor: CPKC

Technical
- Track gauge: 4 ft 8 1/2 in (1,435 mm) standard gauge
- Length: 481.01 miles (774.11 km)

Other
- Website: cmqrailway.com

The Central Maine & Québec Railway (reporting mark CMQ) was a Class II freight railroad operating in the U.S. states of Maine and Vermont and the Canadian province of Quebec with headquartered in Bangor, Maine. It was owned by Railroad Acquisition Holdings, a subsidiary of Fortress Investment Group. It has been a subsidiary of Canadian Pacific since June 2020.

Its United States operations were named the Central Maine and Québec Railway US Incorporated with offices in New York, and was registered with the Surface Transportation Board on February 14, 2014.

Its Canadian operations were named the Central Maine and Québec Railway Canada Incorporated with offices in Sherbrooke, QC, and were registered with Revenue Québec on February 14, 2014.

== History ==
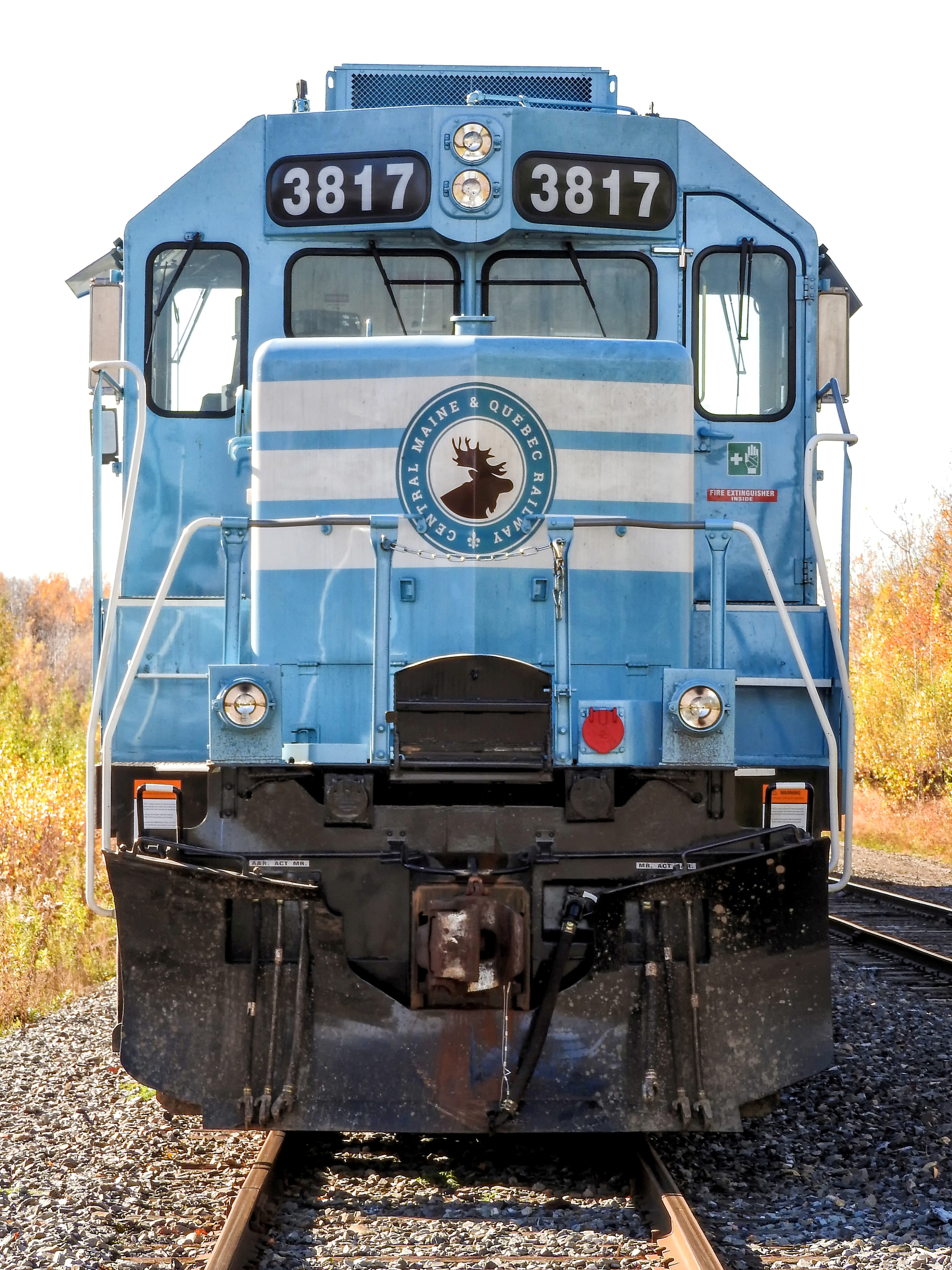
EMD GP38-3 locomotive in October 2017

The Montreal, Maine & Atlantic Railway (reporting mark MMA), itself a product of the 2002 Iron Road Railways bankruptcy, filed for bankruptcy in the United States and Canada on August 7, 2013, following the fiery Lac-Mégantic rail disaster, in which a runaway crude oil train derailed at high speed, killing forty-seven people and causing an estimated $200 million in property damage to downtown Lac-Mégantic, Quebec. The company received protection under Chapter 11 of the United States Bankruptcy Code and under the Companies' Creditors Arrangement Act in Canada to oversee the sale of assets.

In December 2013, Fortress Investment Group, through its subsidiary Railroad Acquisition Holdings (RAH) placed a stalking horse bid on the operating rail lines, which was accepted by the bankruptcy trustee in January 2014. In February 2014 RAH announced that it had formed the CMQ to become the operating entity of the rail lines and that the sale would be concluded in March 2014. CM&Q received its certificate of fitness from the Canadian Transportation Agency on June 24, 2014.

In March 2014, John E. Giles of RAH drove the length of the line, visiting communities and industries served by the railway and inspecting the condition of tracks and installations. He estimated a $10–20 million investment would be needed over three years to repair the rail line, then in poor condition and not safe for the transport of oil or dangerous goods.

In the same year, the CMQR acquired 10 GMD SD40-2Fs from Canadian Pacific.

The company planned to resume transport of crude oil by rail in January 2016; however, this did not happen due to petroleum market conditions.

In 2017, CMQ took over operations of the former NS Hannibal Subdivision in Ohio from Norfolk Southern. The line services several Fortress owned industries at the former Long Ridge Energy Generation Facility in Clarington, Ohio. CIT owned SD40-2's 3053 and 3082 were assigned to operate the line. Crews were sent from Maine for a week at a time to operate trains. After the CP takeover, this operation was retained by Fortress Investment under the former CMQ subsidiary Katahdin Railcar Services.

On November 20, 2019, it was announced that Canadian Pacific Railway would purchase CMQ. Canadian Pacific's CEO, Keith Creel remarked that the acquisition would give CP a true coast-to-coast network across Canada and an increased presence in New England. This would result in several former CP rail lines in Maine and Quebec, which were sold over the years to CM&Q's predecessor railroads, being reacquired by CP.

The transaction was completed on June 4, 2020.

== Rockland Branch Operation ==
In September 2015, CMQ was selected by the Maine Department of Transportation to operate the state-owned Rockland Branch rail line between Brunswick and Rockland, taking over the line from previous operator Maine Eastern Railroad on January 1, 2016. The CMQ proposal did not include the operation of passenger excursions that had been operated by Maine Eastern, ending 11 years of successful passenger rail operations along the Maine coast.

At the end of August 2021, it was announced Finger Lakes Railway would take over operation of the Rockland Branch. Soon after the STB approved the transfer of operation, Dragon Cement, the largest shipper on the line, announced they would no longer ship cement out of its Rockland facility by the end of the year, ending the rail shuttle operation that makes up most of the revenue for this line.

== Routes ==
CMQ owned and operated the following rail lines:

- Searsport Subdivision (29 mi (47 km) Northern Maine Junction, ME to Searsport, ME)
- Millinocket Subdivision (78.5 mi (126.3 km) Northern Maine Junction, ME to Millinocket, ME)
- East Millinocket Subdivision (6.19 mi (9.96 km) Millinocket, ME to East Millinocket, ME)
- Madawaska Subdivision (1.5 mi (2.4 km) Millinocket, ME to start of Maine Northern Railway (reporting mark MNRY))
- K.I. Subdivision (3.74 mi (6.02 km) Brownville, ME to Brownville Junction, ME)
- Moosehead Subdivision (117.1 mi (188.5 km) Brownville Junction, ME to Lac-Mégantic, QC)
- Sherbrooke Subdivision (125.6 mi (202.1 km) Lac-Mégantic, QC to Brookport, QC)
- Adirondack Subdivision (20.0 mi (32.2 km) Brookport, QC to St-Jean-sur-Richelieu, QC)
- Newport Subdivision (60.4 mi (97.2 km) Brookport, QC to Newport, VT)
- Stanbridge Subdivision (12.57 mi (20.23 km) Farnham, QC to Stanbridge, QC)
- St-Guillaume Subdivision (26.4 mi (42.5 km) Farnham, QC to Sainte-Rosalie, QC)
- Maine DOT Rockland Branch (58.68 mi (94.44 km) Rockland, ME to Brunswick, ME)
- Maine DOT Atlantic Branch (1.1 mi (1.8 km) Rockland, ME to Rockland, ME)
- Hannibal Subdivision

CMQ owned a total of 481.01 mi (774.11 km) of rail line which are broken down by jurisdiction as follows:

- 220.73 mi (355.23 km) in Maine
- 236.81 mi (381.11 km) in Quebec
- 23.47 mi (37.77 km) in Vermont

== Interchange points ==
- Canadian National (reporting mark CN)
  - Saint-Jean-sur-Richelieu, QC
  - Sainte-Rosalie, QC
- Canadian Pacific (reporting mark CP)
  - Saint-Jean-sur-Richelieu, QC
- Eastern Maine Railway (reporting mark EMRY)
  - Brownville Junction, ME
- Maine Northern Railway (reporting mark MNRY)
  - Millinocket, ME
- CSX Transportation (reporting mark CSXT)
  - Northern Maine Junction, ME
  - Brunswick, Maine
- St. Lawrence and Atlantic Railroad (reporting mark SLR) / (reporting mark SLQ)
  - Lennoxville, QC
- Washington County Railroad (reporting mark WACR)
  - Newport, VT

== See also ==
- Orford Express, an independently owned tourist train on part of the CM&QR line
