= Canadian American Railroad =

Railroad between the U.S and Canada (operated 1995-2002)

Overview
- Headquarters: Hermon, Maine
- Reporting mark: CDAC
- Locale: Maine; Quebec
- Dates of operation: 1994–2002
- Predecessor: Canadian Atlantic Railway
- Successor: Montreal, Maine & Atlantic Railway

Technical
- Track gauge: 4 ft 8 1/2 in (1,435 mm) standard gauge
- Length: 372 miles (599 km)

The Canadian American Railroad (reporting mark CDAC) was a railroad that operated between Brownville Junction, Maine and Lennoxville, Quebec. The railroad later expanded west to Farnham, Quebec and then St-Jean-sur-Richelieu, Quebec with running rights on Canadian Pacific Railway (CP) to Montreal, Quebec. CDAC was established in 1994 and operated as a railroad between 1995 and 2002. It was owned by transportation holding company Iron Road Railways.

== History ==
Beginning in 1993, CP announced its intention to abandon or sell its Canadian Atlantic Railway (CAR) subsidiary due to declining traffic levels.

In early January 1995 the eastern portion of the CAR mainline from Saint John, New Brunswick to Brownville Junction, Maine was sold to industrial conglomerate J.D. Irving Limited (JDI) which created the New Brunswick Southern Railway (NBS) and Eastern Maine Railway (EMR) as subsidiaries. Owning this section gave JDI access to interchange points with CN Rail (CN) at Saint John, New Brunswick, Guilford Rail System at Mattawamkeag, Maine, and Bangor & Aroostook Railroad (BAR) at Brownville Junction, ME.

Also in early January 1995, the western portion of the CAR mainline from Brownville Junction to Lennoxville, Quebec saw operation transferred to the Canadian American Railroad (CDAC) which was a joint venture of Iron Road Railways and Fieldcrest Cannon Inc. established in mid-1994. In March 1995, CDAC completed purchase of this portion of the CAR mainline from CP; at that time, Iron Road Railways bought out the interest of Fieldcrest Cannon to assume complete control. Also in March 1995, Iron Road Railways purchased the BAR, creating a T-shaped system focused on the interchange point at Brownville Junction. Iron Road Railways also entered into an agreement with J.D. Irving to market the entire line from Lennoxville to Saint John, however EMR and NBSR remained the operator for the line east of Brownville Junction.

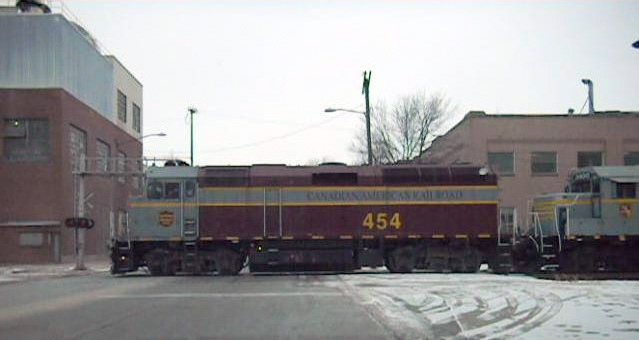
CDAC 454 leading an Iowa Northern Railway train at Cedar Rapids, Iowa

For the remainder of the 1990s, CDAC was able to dramatically increase the amount of freight traffic handled from what CP had carried, largely due to aggressive marketing and customized service, particularly for the forestry industry. After several years CDAC operations extended west from Lennoxville to a junction in Farnham, Quebec after Iron Road Railways purchased a former CP route in northern Vermont. CDAC trains also handled traffic from BAR and intermodal traffic from Saint John. The growth of intermodal traffic saw CDAC receive trackage rights over CP from Farnham to Montreal where trains terminated at Cote St. Luc Yard.

CDAC's physical plant suffered due to deferred maintenance, as the holding company Iron Road Railways encountered financial difficulties by the early 2000s. Plans to improve infrastructure for Brownville Junction to Farnham during 1999 never stalled: CDAC and BAR and its affiliates filed for bankruptcy in 2001. On 8 October 2002, the Montreal, Maine & Atlantic Railway (MMA) acquired all of the assets of Iron Road Railways' operations in Maine, Quebec, and Vermont including CDAC and BAR. CP has since regained ownership of the former Canadian Atlantic rail lines, through the 2019 acquisition of MMA's successor, Central Maine and Quebec Railway.
