= Lac-Mégantic, Quebec =

Lac-Mégantic
- Town
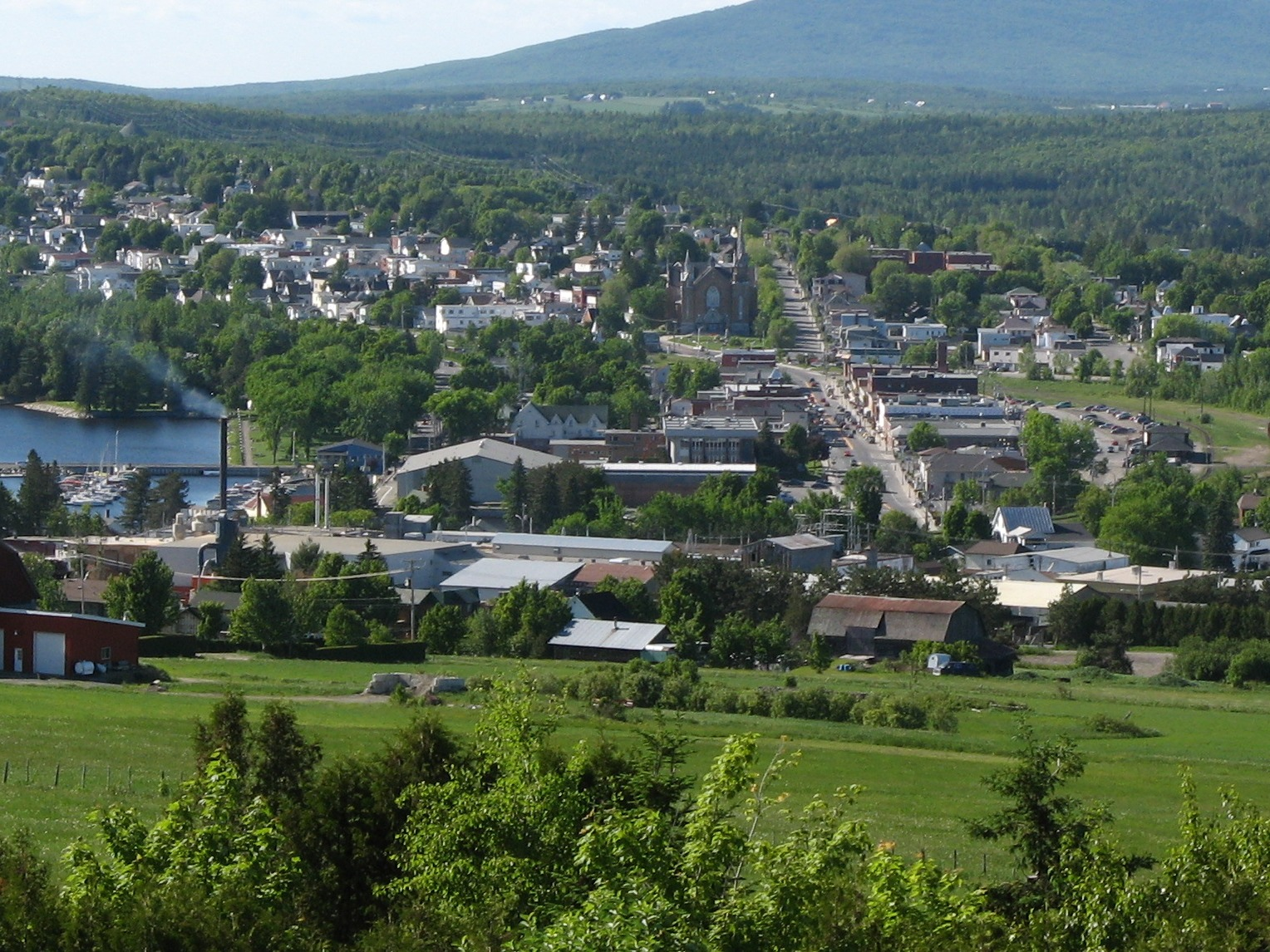
- Lac-Mégantic's town center prior to its 2013 destruction

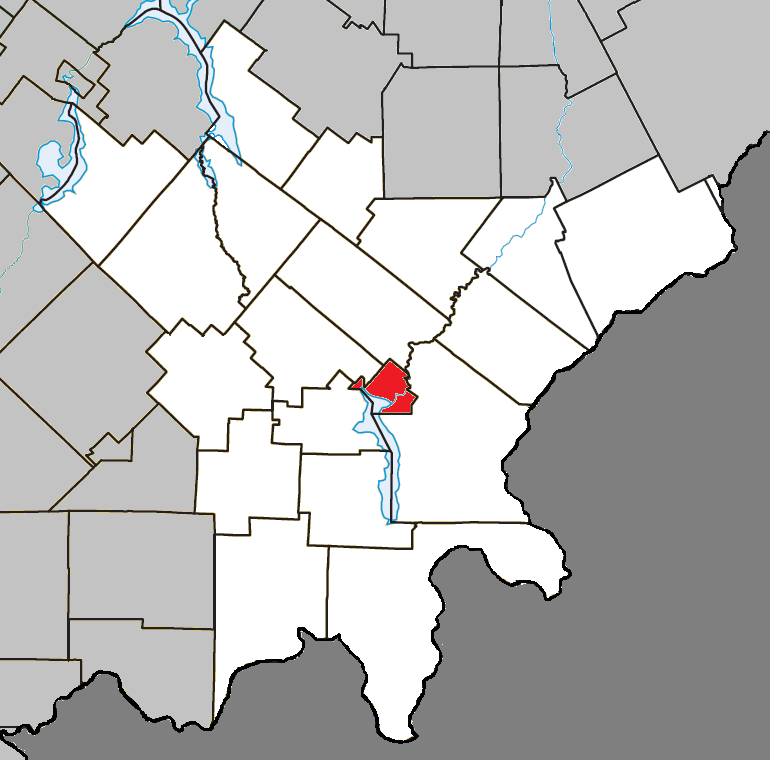
- Location within Le Granit RCM.

- Location in southern Quebec. Lac-Mégantic (Quebec) Lac-Mégantic (Canada)
- Coordinates: 45°35′N 70°53′W
- Country: Canada
- Province: Quebec
- Region: Estrie
- RCM: Le Granit
- Settled: 1884
- Constituted: March 14, 1907

Government
  - Mayor: Julie Morin
  - Federal riding: Mégantic—L'Érable—Lotbinière
  - Prov. riding: Mégantic

Area
  - Town: 25.20 km^{2} (9.73 sq mi)
  - Land: 21.98 km^{2} (8.49 sq mi)
  - Urban: 9.32 km^{2} (3.60 sq mi)

Population (2021)
  - Town: 5,747
  - Density: 261.5/km^{2} (677/sq mi)
  - Urban: 5,808
  - Urban density: 623.1/km^{2} (1,614/sq mi)
  - Pop 2016–2021: ▲1.6%
  - Dwellings: 3,143
- Time zone: UTC−5 (EST)
  - Summer (DST): UTC−4 (EDT)
- Postal code(s): G6B
- Area code: 819
- Highways: R-161; R-204
- Website: www.ville. lac-megantic.qc.ca

Lac-Mégantic (French pronunciation: [lak meɡɑ̃tik]) is a town in the Estrie region of Quebec, Canada. It is located on Lake Mégantic, a freshwater lake after which the town was named. Situated in the former Frontenac County in the historic Eastern Townships, Lac-Mégantic is the seat of Le Granit Regional County Municipality and of the judicial district of Mégantic.

Lac-Mégantic is a tourist destination and a producer of forestry products, furniture, Masonite doors, particleboard, and architectural granite.

On July 6, 2013, the Lac-Mégantic rail disaster led to a massive fire and a deadly explosion of petroleum tank cars that destroyed many downtown buildings and killed 47 people.

== History ==
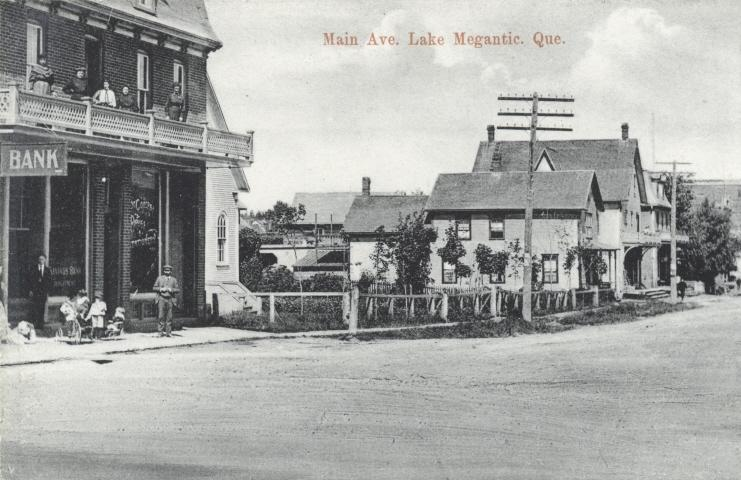
Main Avenue (Avenue Principale) in 1910.

Prior to contact with Europeans, the region was inhabited by the Abenaki. Archaeological digs found that the Amerindians had been in the region for over 12,000 years, making this the oldest known site of human occupation in Quebec. The name of Mégantic comes from the Abenaki word "namesokanjik" which translates to "place where the fish are held."

The first known European to discover the region was a Catholic missionary, Father Druillettes of the Society of Jesus, who arrived in 1646. He came to convert the Abenaki.

The first colonists to settle in the region came two centuries later, around 1850, and were of French Canadian or Scottish origin.

Originally called Megantic, the town was founded in 1884 after the Canadian Pacific Railway began construction of the final segment in its transcontinental railway linking Montreal with the Atlantic Ocean port of Saint John, New Brunswick. This line opened in 1889, and was operated by International Railway of Maine, a subsidiary of CPR. Mégantic was the meeting place of two railroads at that time: the Canadian Pacific Railway and the Quebec Central Railway. The CPR line was more important because of its adaptation to large freight and passenger trains.

Nearby Agnès, founded in 1895, was named after Susan Agnes Bernard, the widow of Prime Minister of Canada Sir John A. Macdonald. It merged with Mégantic in 1907. Macdonald and his wife had visited the area in 1879. Mégantic was renamed Lac-Mégantic in 1958, after the adjacent Lake Mégantic, located on the municipality's southern boundary. Lac-Mégantic consisted of two Roman Catholic parishes, Sainte-Agnès and Notre-Dame-de-Fatima.

An important figure of Lac-Mégantic was Joseph Édouard Eugène Choquette, a priest, who, in his spare time, was an amateur scientist. He was the catalyst for the creation of an electric lighting system which, on the eve of Christmas in 1898, illuminated the entire city; and a power company. Father Choquette was also an amateur photographer.

=== Donald Morrison case ===
The first mayor (1885–1888) of Mégantic was Malcolm MacAuley, who was linked to the Donald Morrison case. Morrison's family had immigrated from the Isle of Lewis, in the Outer Hebrides of Scotland and had settled locally in a largely Canadian Gaelic-speaking farming community. Donald Morrison moved out west to work as a cowboy on a ranch, sending money home to pay off the family debts. When he returned home, he found his family had lost their farm after they had signed a bad debt deal with Mayor MacAuley, the wealthiest resident in the town at the time. A barn belonging to the new owner was burned to the ground, and Donald Morrison was immediately charged with arson. A bounty of $25 was placed on Morrison, and an American bailiff was paid $2.50 a day to track him down. The bailiff was killed in a gunfight with Morrison on the town's main street. Morrison was chased through the woods for another ten months before being wounded, captured, and imprisoned. He died of tuberculosis five years later.

=== Lac-Mégantic derailment ===
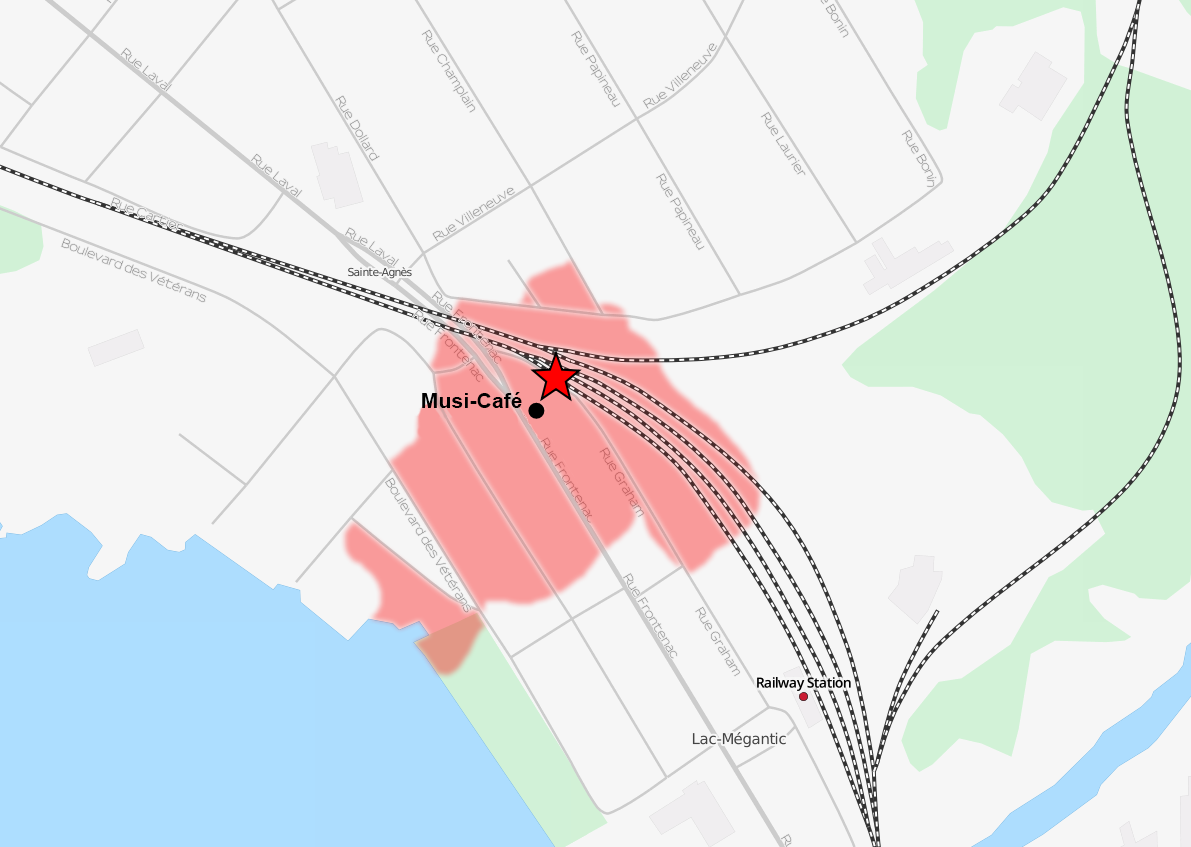
Area of derailment, fires, and explosions

At approximately 01:15 EDT, on July 6, 2013, an unattended 73-car freight train carrying crude oil ran away and derailed near the downtown area of Lac-Mégantic, causing multiple tank cars to catch fire and explode. Forty-seven people were killed or presumed killed in the explosion and ensuing blaze, making the derailment Canada's deadliest rail disaster since the St-Hilaire train disaster in 1864. More than 30 buildings in the town's centre were destroyed, including the town's library and archives. The police launched a criminal investigation, charging the Montreal, Maine and Atlantic Railway and three workers with criminal negligence. Of the 39 downtown buildings still standing in December 2014, thirty-six were scheduled to be demolished due to petroleum contamination of the underlying grounds.

== Geography ==
Lac-Mégantic is located at the eastern part of the Estrie administrative region, in the Regional County Municipality of Le Granit, approximately 35 kilometres (22 mi) from the United States border. The Chaudière River has its source in Lake Megantic and empties into the St. Lawrence River, some 175 kilometres (109 mi) further north, near Lévis (within the former city of Saint-Romuald). The Town of Lac-Mégantic is located 50 kilometres (31 mi) from Mont Mégantic.

== Demographics ==
Historical population
Year	Pop.	±%
1911	2,816	—
1921	3,140	+11.5%
1931	3,911	+24.6%
1941	4,560	+16.6%
1951	6,164	+35.2%
1956	6,864	+11.4%
1961	7,015	+2.2%
1966	6,958	−0.8%
1971	6,770	−2.7%
1976	6,457	−4.6%
1981	6,119	−5.2%
1986	5,732	−6.3%
1991	5,852	+2.1%
1996	5,864	+0.2%
2001	5,897	+0.6%
2006	5,967	+1.2%
2011	5,932	−0.6%
2016	5,654	−4.7%
2021	5,747	+1.6%

In the 2021 Census of Population conducted by Statistics Canada, Lac-Mégantic had a population of 5,747 living in 2,938 of its 3,143 total private dwellings, a change of 1.6% from its 2016 population of 5,654. With a land area of 21.98 km^{2} (8.49 sq mi), it had a population density of 261.5/km^{2} (677.2/sq mi) in 2021.

In 2021, the median age of Lac-Mégantic was 53.6 and 87% of the population were 15 years of age and over.

Residents whose sole native language was French numbered 5,705 (98%), while those with only English as their first language were 60 (1%), 40 people (0.7%) had another language as their mother tongue and 20 people (0.3%) counted both French and English as their first language.

Mother tongue language (2021)

Language	Population	Pct (%)
French only	5,435	96.2%
English only	75	1.3%
Both English and French	25	0.4%
Other languages	100	1.8%

== Economy ==
Although the railway has declined in recent decades, Lac-Mégantic remains an important centre of agriculture, logging, lumber and pulp and paper. Sonae Indústria's local subsidiary, Tafisa Canada, operates a 65,000 square feet (6,000 m^{2}) particleboard factory in the town. Other major local employers include furniture manufacturer Bestar and forestry company Industries Manufacturières Mégantic, part of Masonite International. Granite from the region was incorporated into the National September 11 Memorial in New York City.

Various other factories existed in the past, including a paper-printing plant; a sash-and-door factory; saw mills; and a butter, cheese, and cheese box factory.

The region's economy in its early days was propelled by the logging industry due to the vast swaths of old-growth forests. Many related industries operated in the region, including lumber (Nantais Mill), the furniture industry and the pulp and paper industry. Lake Mégantic was used for log floating, with a steamboat used to tow the logs to the sawmill. The first steamboat in the region, named the "Lena", was built by George Flint in 1881.

At the time of the industrial revolution, rural and working classes made up the majority of Mégantic's population. In 1907, the town had 2600 people and the daily wage for a labourer was around C$1 to C$1.50. The working class lived in the northern district of the city, while those in liberal professions, as well as store clerks and employees of financial institutions lived in the central part of the city (downtown).

The first bank branch in the town was the People's Bank of Halifax, which opened in December 1893. Its first manager was a Mr. Aitkens from Cookshire. The bank was acquired by Bank of Montreal in 1905 and a new building constructed that same year. The branch closed in 2001 and was sold to Banque Nationale; the 5193 Frontenac Street building later housed legal aid offices. Only a broken, charred shell remained after the 2013 Lac-Mégantic derailment burned much of the historic downtown but some legal records secured in the historic bank's vault survived the fire. The Eastern Townships Bank, established in Sherbrooke in 1859, opened a Mégantic office in 1904 and acquired its own building at Frontenac and Thibodeau in 1910. That bank was acquired by the Canadian Bank of Commerce in 1912; the local branch with its distinctive architectural columns closed during the Great Depression in 1935.

=== Tourism ===
The region has increased its reliance on tourism, a mainstay since the passenger rail era, attracting people from across Quebec and the Northeastern United States.

Lac-Mégantic profits from its proximity to two major provincial parks, Frontenac National Park on Lac Saint-François and Mont-Mégantic National Park near Notre-Dame-des-Bois. Mont-Mégantic Park is home of the ASTROlab astronomy museum and the Mont Mégantic Observatory, a mountaintop observatory and dark-sky preserve.

The Lac-Mégantic lakeshore is host to the Complexe Baie des Sables beachfront park, the annual Traversée internationale du lac Mégantic swim meet in August and the Grand tour du lac Mégantic cycle tour each June.

The most popular activities for tourists are hunting and fishing.

== Government ==
=== Municipal ===
The mayor of Lac-Mégantic was Jean-Guy Cloutier, who was elected in a special election in 2015 to succeed retiring mayor Colette Roy-Laroche.

Due to the rail disaster, the provincial government of Quebec had delayed the municipal election in Lac-Mégantic from its regular timing concurrent with the 2013 municipal elections; the next election was held normally in 2017. Roy-Laroche, a former schoolmaster, was nicknamed "the granite lady" (French: la dame de granit) for her handling of the derailment and its aftermath. The town council is made up of councillors representing six electoral districts.

In 2017, mayor Julie Morin was elected with 69,28% of popular vote. In 2021 and 2025, she was re-elected without any opposition.

District	Name
1. Agnès	Richard Michaud
2. Fatima	Denis Roy
3. Centre-Ville	Jacques Dostie
4. Québec-Central	Jean Labbé
5. Vieux-Nord	Huguette Breton
6. Montignac	Yves Gilbert

=== Federal and provincial ===
Provincially, Lac-Mégantic is located in the provincial electoral district of Mégantic. It is represented by Jimmy Gagnon of the Conservative Party of Quebec.

Federally, Lac-Mégantic is part of the federal riding of Mégantic—L'Érable—Lotbinière. It is represented by Luc Berthold of the Conservative Party of Canada.

== Infrastructure ==
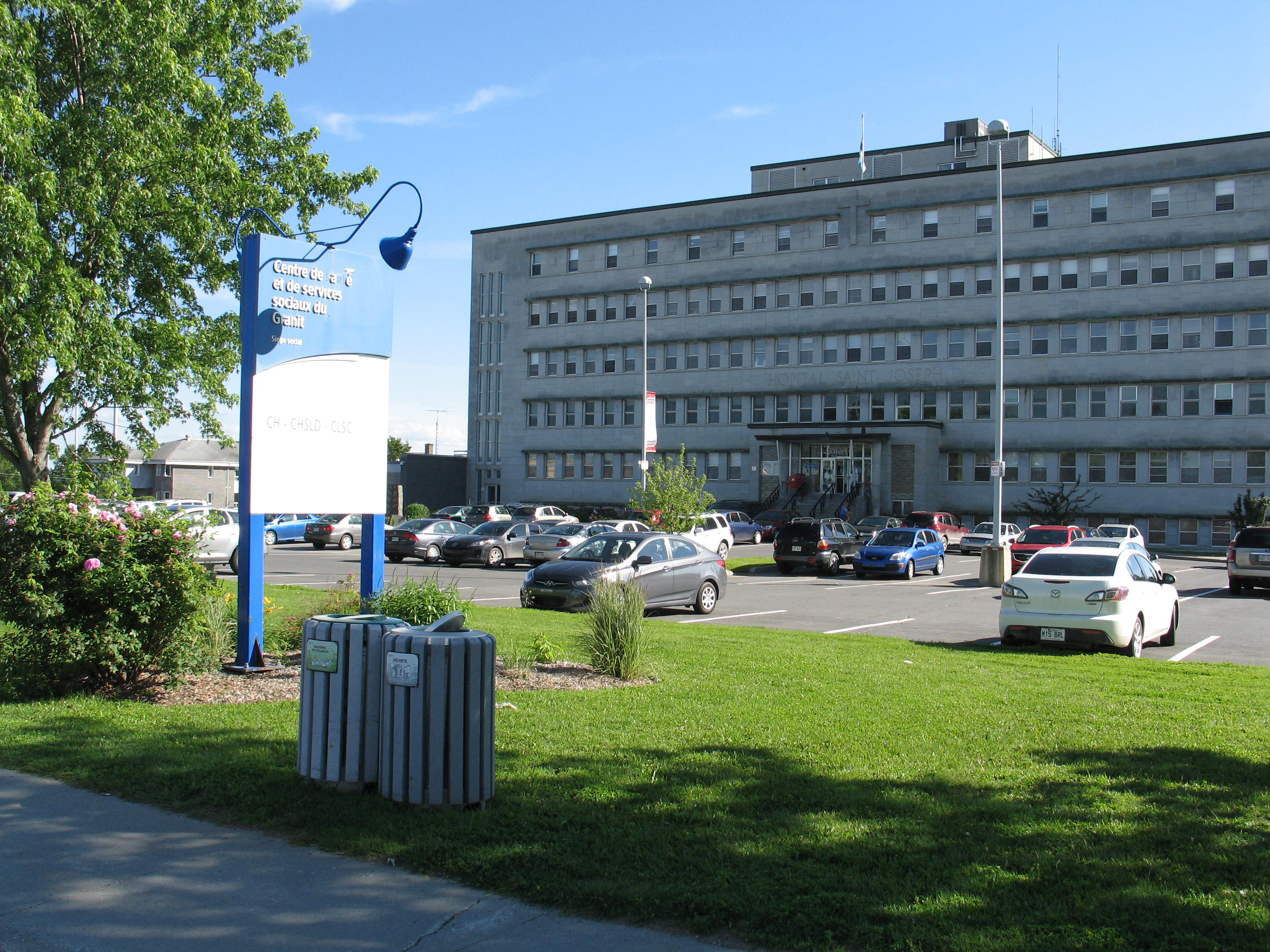
The Centre de santé et services sociaux du Granit, on Laval Street is the community's main health facility.

Lac Mégantic is crossed by Quebec Route 161 and Quebec Route 204.

Canadian Pacific Railway (CP) built a transcontinental railway line linking Montreal with the Atlantic Ocean port of Saint John, New Brunswick. The division from Lac-Mégantic to Mattawamkeag, Maine, was operated by CP subsidiary International Railway of Maine and opened in 1889. The Atlantic passenger train was operated by CP and later Via Rail over this line, but was eliminated in December 1994.

In 1988, CP consolidated its Lac-Mégantic-Saint John line into the Canadian Atlantic Railway. In December 1994, the line was sold to Canadian American Railroad (part of Iron Road Railways). After that company's 2003 bankruptcy, the Montreal, Maine and Atlantic Railway provided freight service until the line in both directions was severed by the Lac-Mégantic derailment in 2013. MM&A claimed Companies' Creditors Arrangement Act bankruptcy protection in August 2013; its assets were sold to Fortress Investment Group as the Central Maine and Quebec Railway in 2014.

In September 1895, the Quebec Central Railway completed a 59.2 miles (95.3 km) branch line from the CP main line at Lac-Mégantic north to Tring Junction, a point from which onward connections were available to Lévis. This line was abandoned in the 1980s and has been removed.

The town was also home to the now-decommissioned Megantic Airport; an industrial park and large sawmill occupy the former airfield.

A municipal sports centre, which opened in 2011, offers a wide range of sporting and educational activities, including a swimming pool and an arena.

Lac-Mégantic is home to the Centre de santé et service sociaux (CSSS) du Granit, which is located on Laval Street. The facility serves the local community and contains a hospital centre for acute care with 35 beds, and a long-term care centre with 44 beds.

== Education ==
Lac Mégantic is home to a junior college, Centre d’études collégiales de Lac-Mégantic, which is affiliated with the Cégep Beauce-Appalaches. The college offers both technical and pre-university training programs including an astrophysics program, which is the only one of its kind in Quebec. It also has a vocational training centre, the Centre de formation professionnelle Le Granit.

The town, in the former Commission scolaire des Hauts-Cantons (now Centre de services scolaire des Hauts-Cantons), has one secondary school, Polyvalente Montignac, and two elementary schools, École Notre-Dame-de-Fatima and École Sacré-Cœur.

The English language school board for the town is Eastern Townships School Board.

Lac-Mégantic is the birthplace of author Nelly Arcan; a new municipal library opened May 5, 2014 bears her name. The library's site (a former Canadelle undergarment factory at 4409, rue Dollard) was chosen in 2010 to accommodate expansion of a collection then over 45,000 volumes. As the original collection was destroyed by fire in 2013, a hundred thousand books were donated by local groups, universities, authors and publishers across Québec.

== Media ==
A weekly newspaper, L'Écho de Frontenac, is published in the town and one radio station, CJIT-FM 106.7, operates from a local studio.

== Sister cities ==
- Dourdan, France (1989)
- Farmington, Maine, United States (1991)
