= United Counties Railways =

Map

United Counties Railways was a short-lived railway that was formed in 1883 and merged in 1900 to form Quebec Southern Railway.

UCR was formed in 1883 and operated rail operations in Quebec from Bellevue Junction (near Sorel) to Richelieu, then expanded to Iberville via St. Hyacinthe. In 1895, the East Richelieu Valley Railway was acquired as a subsidiary, extending the line south to an intersection with the Grand Trunk at Noyan.

UCR merged to form Quebec Southern Railway in 1900.
