= Quebec Southern Railway =

Railway in Quebec

Quebec Southern Railroad
Overview
- Reporting mark: QSR
- Locale: Quebec
- Dates of operation: 1900–1903; 1996–2003
- Predecessor: East Richelieu Valley Railway; Quebec, Montreal & Southern Railway
- Successor: Quebec, Montreal & Southern Railway; Montreal, Maine & Atlantic Railway

Technical
- Track gauge: 4 ft 8 1/2 in (1,435 mm) standard gauge

Quebec Southern Railway (reporting marks QSR) refers to two former railways operated in Quebec from 1900 to 1903 and again from 1996 to 2003. The railway was owned by American railway operators, but most of its existence was under Canadian ownership.

== First railway ==
Map of the Quebec, Montreal & Southern Railway

QSR began as East Richelieu Valley Railway in 1890 and 1895 it was acquired by United Counties Railways and in 1900 renamed as QSR when it was acquired by Rutland Railroad. The QSR name was short-lived as it was acquired by Delaware & Hudson Railway and renamed Quebec, Montreal & Southern Railway in 1906.

== Second Railway ==
QMSR became part of Canadian National Railway's Quebec operations from 1929 to 1991 and then under rival Canadian Pacific Railway (CP) from 1991 to 1996, spun off by CP to Iron Road Railways which resurrected the QSR name in 1996.

The 2002 bankruptcy of Iron Road Railways saw QSR's assets sold in 2003. The rail line and property was acquired by the Montreal, Maine and Atlantic Railway (reporting mark MMA) and the QSR name disappeared once more.

After the 2013 bankruptcy of MMA, the rail line and property were acquired in 2014 by the Central Maine and Quebec Railway (reporting mark CMQR).
