= Iowa Northern Railway =

US shortline railroad

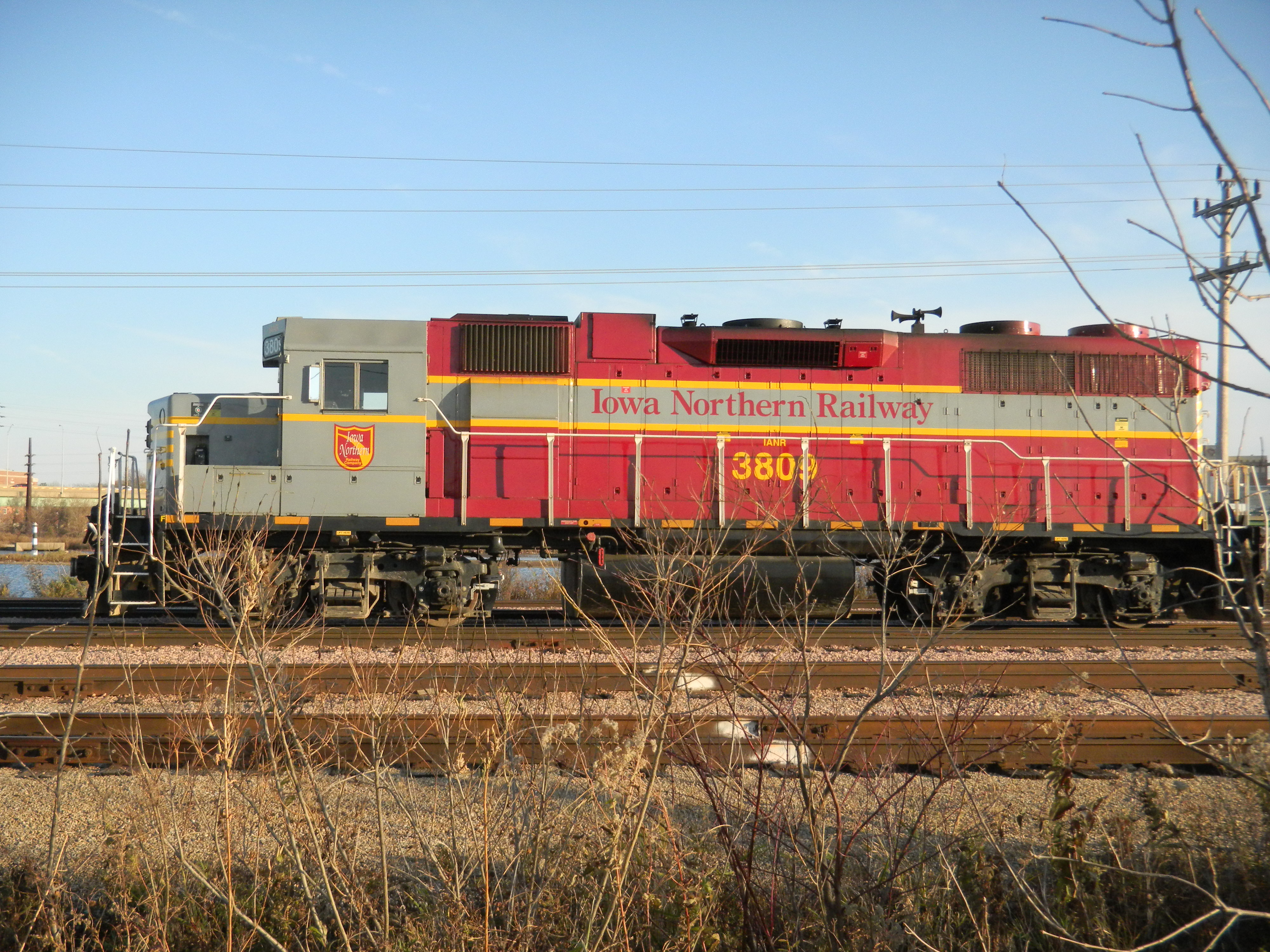
- IANR 3809 idles at Cedar Rapids, Iowa

Overview
- Headquarters: Waterloo, Iowa
- Reporting mark: IANR
- Locale: Waterloo, Cedar Rapids, Manly, Oelwein, and Garner, Iowa
- Dates of operation: August 1981–February 13, 2025

Technical
- Track gauge: 4 ft 8 1/2 in (1,435 mm) standard gauge

The Iowa Northern Railway (reporting mark IANR) was a Class III shortline railroad operating in the U.S. state of Iowa.

== History ==
The origin of the Iowa Northern Railway starts with the major portion of the Manly to Cedar Rapids line which was built in the 1870s by the Burlington, Cedar Rapids and Northern Railroad, which became part of the Chicago, Rock Island and Pacific Railroad (Rock Island RR) in 1902, and remained operated by the Rock Island until that company's bankruptcy in 1980.

On August 1, 1981, IANR operated their 1st inspection train consisting of IANR GP7 610 locomotive and a leased CNW passenger car. Next on August 7, 1981, short line service between Cedar Rapids and Vinton and from Shell Rock to Nora Springs started. By mid-1982, the operations had been connected and expanded to the present size. Iowa Northern Railway was incorporated in 1984, becoming one of the first short-line railroads in the state of Iowa and in July 1984 purchased its line from the bankrupt Chicago, Rock Island & Pacific Railroad estate for US$5.4 million.

The railroad was originally owned by a group of grain elevators located along the line but was sold in 1994 to Iron Road Railways (IRR), a holding company based in Alexandria, Virginia, and Livonia, Michigan. In July of 1994, IANR abandoned a 14-mile (23 km) branch from Vinton to Dysart, Iowa.

In 2003, following the bankruptcy and dissolution of IRR, the IANR was taken over by former IRR director Daniel Sabin.

In December 2023, the Canadian National Railway (CN) set to acquire the IANR with proposition to be reviewed by the Surface Transportation Board (STB). On January 14, 2025, the STB approved the CN acquisition of the Iowa Northern Railway.

== Operations ==
Iowa Northern Railway operates 163 miles (262 km) in Iowa between Cedar Rapids in eastern Iowa and Manly in north central Iowa. The railroad connects with the Cedar Rapids and Iowa City Railway in Cedar Rapids; with the Canadian National Railway subsidiary Chicago Central and Pacific Railroad in Cedar Rapids and Waterloo; with the Canadian Pacific Kansas City subsidiary Iowa, Chicago and Eastern Railroad) in Nora Springs; and with the Union Pacific Railroad in Manly, Waterloo, Cedar Rapids and Belmond. The Oelwein Subdivision operates over 23 miles (37 km) and the Garner Subdision operates over 28 miles (45 km) of trackage with portions of travel via incidental trackage rights. The railroad employs 100+ people, all located in Iowa. The railroad is headquartered in Waterloo, and has Customer Service and General Offices located there as well. Its Bryant Yard Shops are located in Waterloo. Traffic consists of grain, ethanol and other bio-fuels related commodities, chemicals, food products, and machinery.

After the short line was established in 1984, the railroad handled 12,000 revenue cars and the average track speed was less than 10 mph (16 km/h). In 2006, traffic surged to 40,000 revenue cars and with increases in track speed on some sections to 25 mph (40 km/h).

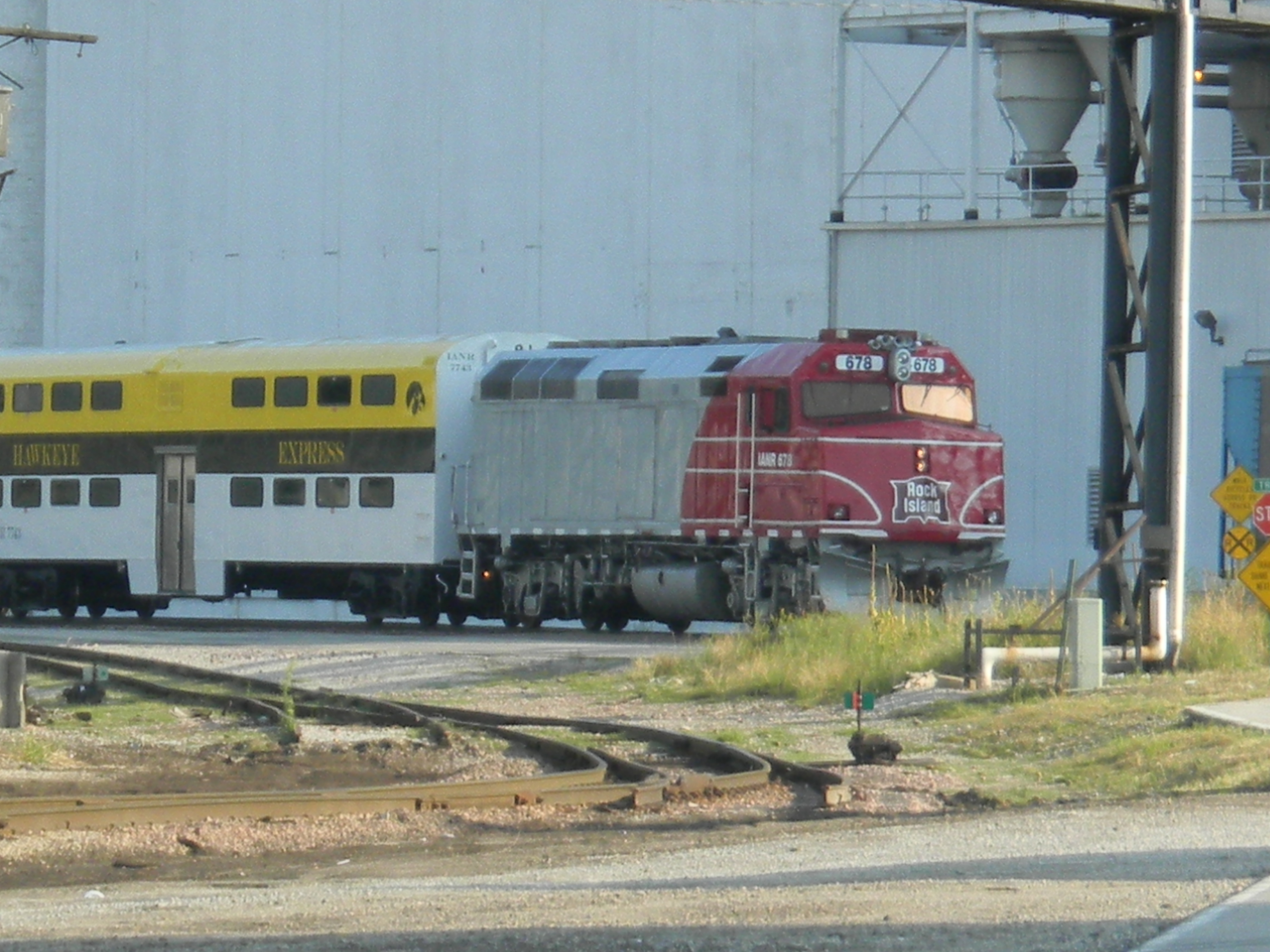
IANR F40PH #678 (since scrapped) at Cedar Rapids, carrying the Hawkeye Express and painted in Rock Island livery as a memorial.

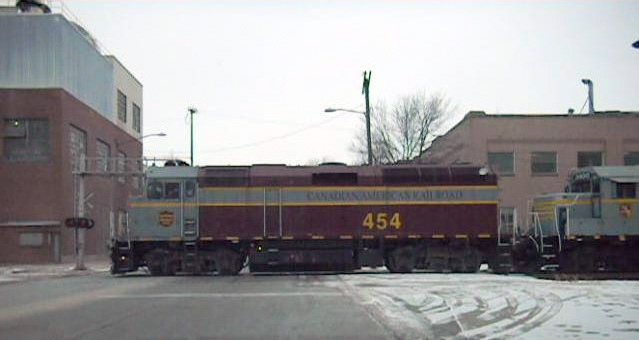
CDAC 454 leads an IANR train at Cedar Rapids.

== Oelwein Subdivision ==
In October 2003, Iowa Northern Railway began freight operations over a 23-mile (37 km) line of the former Chicago Great Western Railway (CGW). This CGW portion of the current rail structure was originally constructed in the 1880s. The Chicago Great Western Railroad merged with Chicago and North Western Railway in 1968. The Chicago and North Western was purchased by the Union Pacific Railroad in 1995. IANR operates freight service over a 23-mile (37 km) line of railroad now owned by D&W Railroad between Dewar and Oelwein and over incidental UP trackage rights between Waterloo and Dewar. Traffic consists of repaired freight cars, grain, and chemical products.

== Garner Subdivision ==
On May 23, 2011, the railroad announced that the North Central Iowa Rail Corridor LLC planned to purchase about 28 miles (45 km) of trackage from the Union Pacific Railroad between Forest City and Belmond, Iowa, that it would access via trackage rights on the Canadian Pacific Railway. Final details indicated that the North Central Iowa Rail Corridor LLC purchased the track for $1.5 million and signed a 10-year lease-to-own agreement with Iowa Northern Railway to operate the line.

On May 27, 2011 [Docket No. FD 35511 pp 31009] Iowa Northern Railway Company filed a verified notice of exemption under 49 CFR 1150.41 to operate approximately 27.83 miles of rail line owned by Union Pacific Railroad Company (UP), referred to as the Forest City Line. The Forest City Line extends between milepost 48.12 at Belmond, Iowa, and milepost 79.95 at Forest City, Iowa, and includes 600 feet of connecting track at Garner, Iowa, in Hancock, Winnebago, and Wright Counties, Iowa.

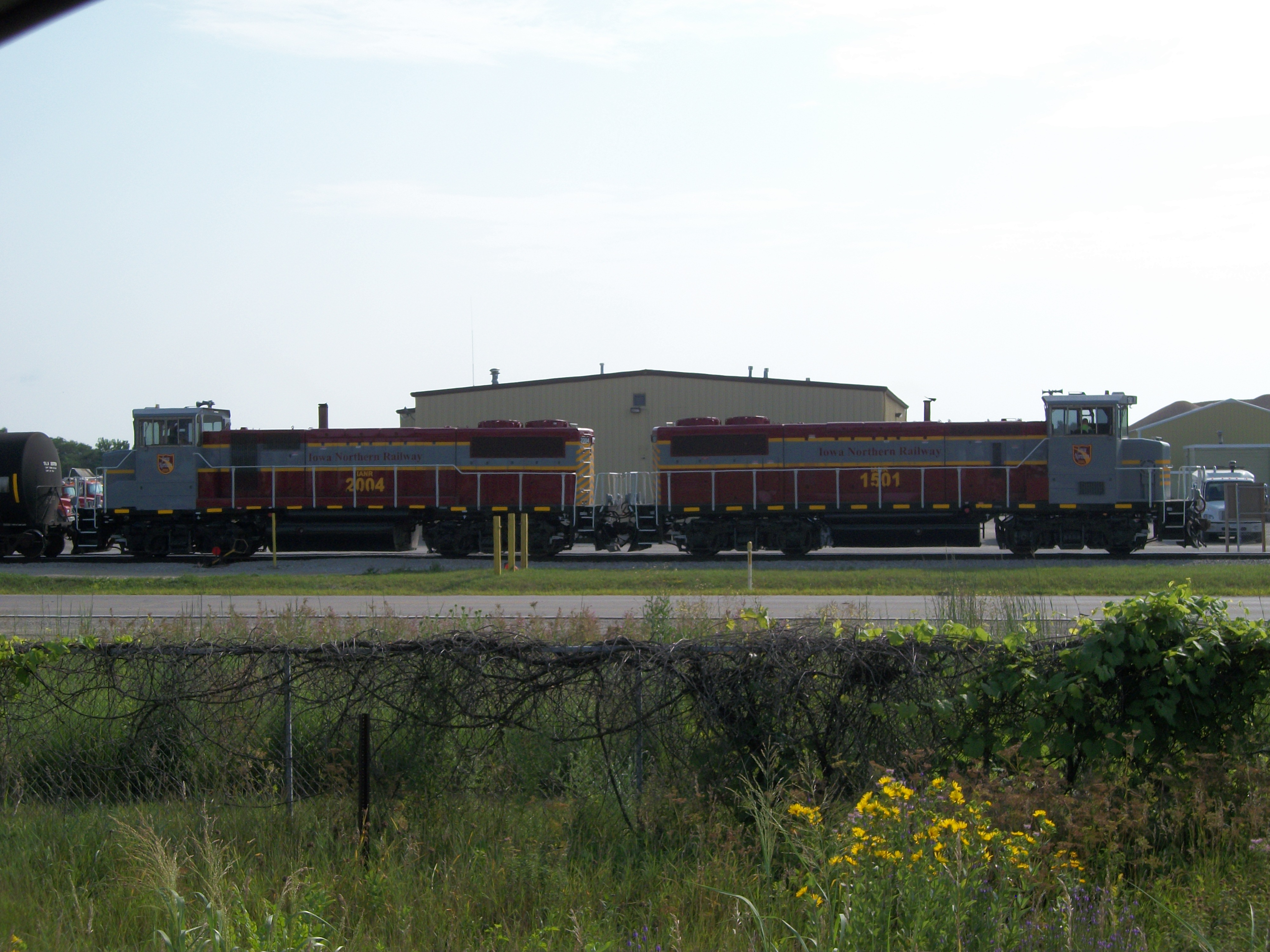
IANR locomotives 1501 and 2004 at Waterloo, Iowa

In addition on May 27, 2011 [Docket No. FD 35511 pp 31010] Pursuant to a prospective trackage rights agreement, Dakota, Minnesota & Eastern Railroad Corporation d/b/a Canadian Pacific (CP) will agree to grant overhead trackage rights to Iowa Northern Railway Company (IANR) over approximately 78.2 miles of rail line between: (1) Milepost 137.50 near Garner, Iowa, and milepost 116.70 at the connection with CP's Mason City Subdivision, a distance of approximately 20.80 miles; (2) milepost 116.70 at the connection with CP's Mason City Subdivision and milepost 107.30 near Nora Jct., Iowa at the connection with IANR, a distance of approximately 30.2 miles between Garner and Nora Jct.; and (3) milepost 116.70 at the connection with CP's Mason City Subdivision and milepost 7.9 on CP's Austin Subdivision near Plymouth Jct., Iowa at the connection with IANR, a distance of approximately 27.2 miles between Garner and Plymouth Jct.

Operation of the Garner Subdivision began on November 4, 2011. IANR operates freight service over a 28-mile line of railroad now owned by North Central Iowa Rail Corridor LLC between Garner, Forest City and Belmond and includes incidental CP trackage rights between Garner, Mason City and Nora Jct or Plymouth Jct. Traffic consists of grain, goods and RV truck products.

== Acquisition by Canadian National ==
On December 6, 2023, CN announced it signed and closed an agreement to acquire Iowa Northern Railway (IANR), which operates in Iowa and connects to CN’s U.S. rail network. On January 14th, 2025, The U.S. Surface Transportation Board (STB) approved CN’s acquisition of Iowa Northern Railway Company (IANR).
