= Maine Northern Railway =

Railroad in Maine and New Brunswick

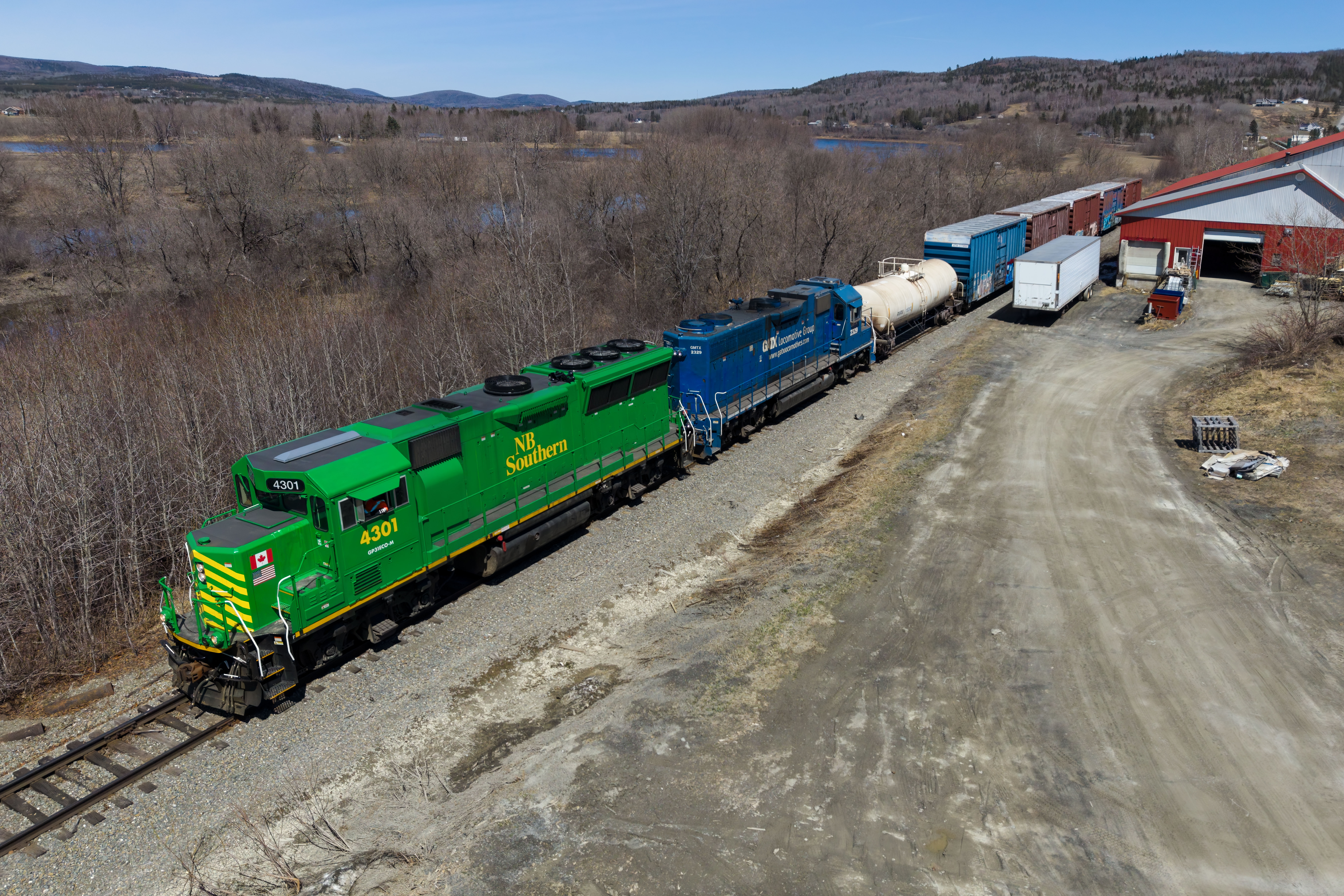
- New Brunswick Southern Railway GP31ECO-M No. 4301 leads a MNRY freight train at Frenchville, Maine.

Overview
- Headquarters: Oakfield, ME
- Reporting mark: MNRY
- Locale: Maine, New Brunswick
- Dates of operation: 2011–

Technical
- Track gauge: 4 ft 8 1/2 in (1,435 mm) standard gauge

The Maine Northern Railway Company Limited (reporting mark MNRY) is a 258 mi (415 km) U.S. and Canadian short line railroad owned by the New Brunswick Railway Company, a holding company that is part of "Irving Transportation Services", a division within the industrial conglomerate J.D. Irving Limited.

MNRY operates over tracks that were originally built for the Bangor & Aroostook Railroad (reporting mark BAR) but were most recently owned and operated by the Montreal, Maine & Atlantic Railway (reporting mark MMA). Approximately 233 mi (375 km) of MNRY's route is owned by the government of the state of Maine while the remaining 25 mi (40 km) is owned by MNRY outright, including the tracks in Canada.

MNRY has two sister companies, the New Brunswick Southern Railway (reporting mark NBSR) and Eastern Maine Railway (reporting mark EMRY) which operate a continuous 189.5 mi (305.0 km) main line connecting Saint John, New Brunswick with Brownville Junction, Maine in addition to another 41.7 mi (67.1 km) of branch lines owned and operated by NBSR in Canada.

== History ==
In early February 2010, the Montreal, Maine & Atlantic Railway filed a "notice of intent" with the Surface Transportation Board (STB) that it intended to abandon 233 miles (375 km) of track in northern Maine, between Madawaska and Millinocket, part of the original Bangor & Aroostook Railroad's mainline, which had been bought by the MMA in 2003.

Affected lines were located in Penobscot and Aroostook counties and included track serving Houlton, Presque Isle, Caribou and Fort Kent. MMA lines between Millinocket and Brownville Junction, Brownville Junction and St-Jean-sur-Richelieu, Brownville Junction and Searsport, and Madawaska to Van Buren were not included in this application.

According to the MMA, losses from operating the lines between Millinocket and Madawaska had reached the point where they were threatening the financial health of the entire railroad. The STB subsequently postponed action on the request in late April, after the railroad and officials with the state of Maine agreed to negotiate to prevent the lines from being abandoned, which the state said could negatively affect the economy of the area. State legislators proposed that the state buy the lines and contract out freight rail service, similar to lines in Vermont and southern Maine.

On October 20, 2010, the railroad reached an agreement to sell 233 miles (375 km) of track in the northern part of Maine to the state government for $20.1 million. The state would then contract operations on the lines to bidders when the deal was closed. The US government also issued $10.5 million in funds to upgrade and maintain the line. Part of this agreement saw the state of Maine being granted trackage rights over the MMA's remaining tracks between Brownville Junction, Maine and the state-owned tracks beginning near Millinocket, Maine which would be used by any successful contracting rail operator.

On 17 December 2010, it was announced that the state was accepting bids for the operation of trackage the state was due to purchase, with the deadline for proposals being 19 January 2011. On 28 December 2010, the STB announced it had approved the abandonment of the tracks in question, allowing the state to purchase them.

On 5 April 2011, it was announced that "Irving Transportation Services", a subsidiary of Canadian-based industrial conglomerate J.D. Irving Ltd. had been awarded the contract to operate the lines in question.

"Irving Transportation Services" formed the MNRY on May 24, 2011 in Delaware and began operations June 15, 2011. In addition to interchanging with MMA at Millinocket, MNRY makes use of the state of Maine's trackage rights between Millinocket and Brownville Junction where it is able to connect with sister company Eastern Maine Railway (reporting mark EMRY) and thus to Pan Am Railways (reporting mark PAR) at Mattawamkeag, Maine.

In December 2011, the MMA and "Irving Transportation Services" reached an agreement for the MMA to sell the remaining 25 miles (40 km) of track between Madawaska, Maine and Van Buren, Maine, MMA's last track in northern Maine, thus ensuring continuous service by the MNRY from Millinocket to Van Buren. At Van Buren, the MNRY owns a railway bridge over the Saint John River that allows MRNY to interchange directly with Canadian National Railway (reporting mark CN) in St. Leonard, New Brunswick. This bridge and associated interchange trackage in New Brunswick had long been a Bangor and Aroostook Railroad (reporting mark BAR) and later MMA subsidiary known as Van Buren Bridge Company.

== Route ==
MNRY operates the following railway lines owned by the state of Maine:

- A portion of the Madawaska Subdivision, consisting of approximately 151 mi (243 km) of line between milepost 109 near Millinocket, Maine in Penobscot County and milepost 260 near Madawaska, Maine in Aroostook County.
- The Presque Isle Subdivision, consisting of approximately 25.3 mi (40.7 km) of line between milepost 0.0 near Squa Pan, Maine and milepost 25.3 near Presque Isle, Maine in Aroostook County.
- The Fort Fairfield Subdivision, consisting of approximately 10 mi (16 km) of line between milepost 0.0 near Presque Isle, Maine and milepost 10.0 near Easton, Maine in Aroostook County.
- The Limestone Subdivision, consisting of approximately 29.85 mi (48.04 km) of line between milepost 0.0 near Presque Isle, Maine and milepost 29.85 near Limestone, Maine in Aroostook County.
- The Houlton Subdivision, consisting of approximately 17.27 mi (27.79 km) of line between milepost 0.0 near Oakfield, Maine and milepost 17.27 near Houlton, Maine in Aroostook County, including the B Spur.

MRNY owns and operates the following railway lines:

- The Van Buren Subdivision, consisting of approximately 25 mi (40 km) of line running between Madawaska, Maine and Van Buren, Maine in Aroostook County, including the Van Buren - St. Leonard Railway Bridge and associated trackage in St. Leonard, New Brunswick.

== Interchange points ==
The MNRY interchanges at two locations:

- In the north, it interchanges with CN at St. Leonard, New Brunswick using an unnamed railway bridge over the Saint John River from Van Buren, Maine.
- In the south, it interchanges directly with CPKC at Millinocket, Maine and via trackage rights at Brownville Junction, Maine with CMQ and MNRY's sister company, the Eastern Maine Railway.
- Also in the south, it interchanges indirectly with CSX Corporation at Mattawamkeag, Maine via EMRY.

== Operations ==
Today most locomotives hauling trains that operate over MNRY are owned and carry the reporting marks of NBSR, however, at least two locomotives has been painted with the reporting marks of MNRY. Some maintenance of way equipment will also likely be owned by MNRY.

== See also ==
- New Brunswick Southern Railway - official website
- New Brunswick Southern Railway - unofficial site
