= Demons and Wizards =

Demons and Wizards may refer to:

- Demons and Wizards (Uriah Heep album), by Uriah Heep
- Demons and Wizards (band), named after the album
- Demons and Wizards (Demons and Wizards album), (2000)
