= D&W Railroad =

Overview
- Headquarters: Chicago, Illinois
- Locale: Oelwein, Iowa, Fairbank, Iowa, Dunkerton, Iowa, Dewar, Iowa
- Dates of operation: 2002–Present

Technical
- Track gauge: 4 ft 8 1/2 in (1,435 mm) standard gauge

The D&W Railroad is a shortline railroad operated by the Iowa Northern Railway.

== History ==
The D&W Railroad was formed in 2002 by TRANSCO Railway Products in order to acquire the rail line from Dewar to Oelwein, Iowa, from the Union Pacific Railroad in lieu of abandonment. D&W Railroad headquarters are located in Chicago, Illinois. In 2005 the railroad reorganized from D&W Railroad, Inc., to D&W Railroad, LLC.

The D&W owns 18.8 miles (30.3 km) of track. The railroad is operated by the Iowa Northern Railway, since September 2013, in order to provide service to shippers.

Upon the completion of the Hawkeye Renewables, LLC Plant in Fairbank in May 2006, Hawkeye Renewables became part owner of the line from Dewer to just outside Fairbank. Plant capacity was originally stated as 100 MMGPY (Annual ethanol production capacity (in millions of gallons)) but quickly increased to 115 MMGPY of ethanol production.

On January 6, 2011, at the Hawkeye Renewables, LLC plant in Fairbank, a notice of agreement was given of sale to Flint Hills Resources Renewables, LLC. Sale of the Hawkeye Renewables, LLC plant in Fairbank to Flint Hills Resources Renewables, LLC was completed on February 17, 2011. Upon completion of the sale, Hawkeye Renewables, LLC relinquished its part ownership of the D&W Railroad back to TRANSCO Railway Products.

In June 2020, Iowa Iowa Northern Railway Company filed an Acquisition Exemption for a portion of the D&W Railroad, LLC approximately 23.40 miles of rail line, as follows: (i) The rail line from milepost 332.0 at Dewar, Iowa, to milepost 354.5 (end of line), including the most easterly rail line and right of way, known as the Main Line, which is located adjacent to the Oelwein Yard in Oelwein, Iowa, (ii) the rail line from milepost 245.58 to milepost 245.0 at Oelwein, and (iii) the rail line that comprises 0.32 miles of wye track at Oelwein that connects the so-called ‘‘East Leg’’ track to the Main Line track (collectively, the Line).

The main products handled on the rail line include grain, chemicals, plastic pellets, grain products, and rail cars to be repaired or rebuilt.

== Naming ==
The "D"&"W" was dedicated in remembrance for Dan and Woody, two former TRANSCO Railway Products employees, who lost their lives in an accident in Oelwein.
