= Bangor and Aroostook Railroad =

United States railroad company

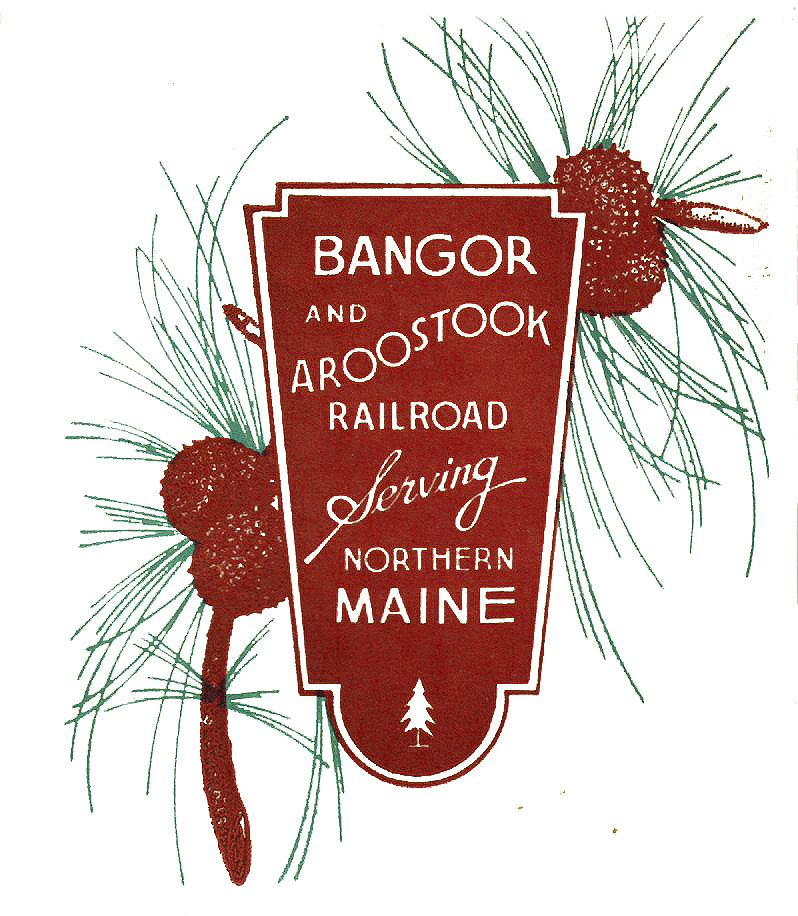

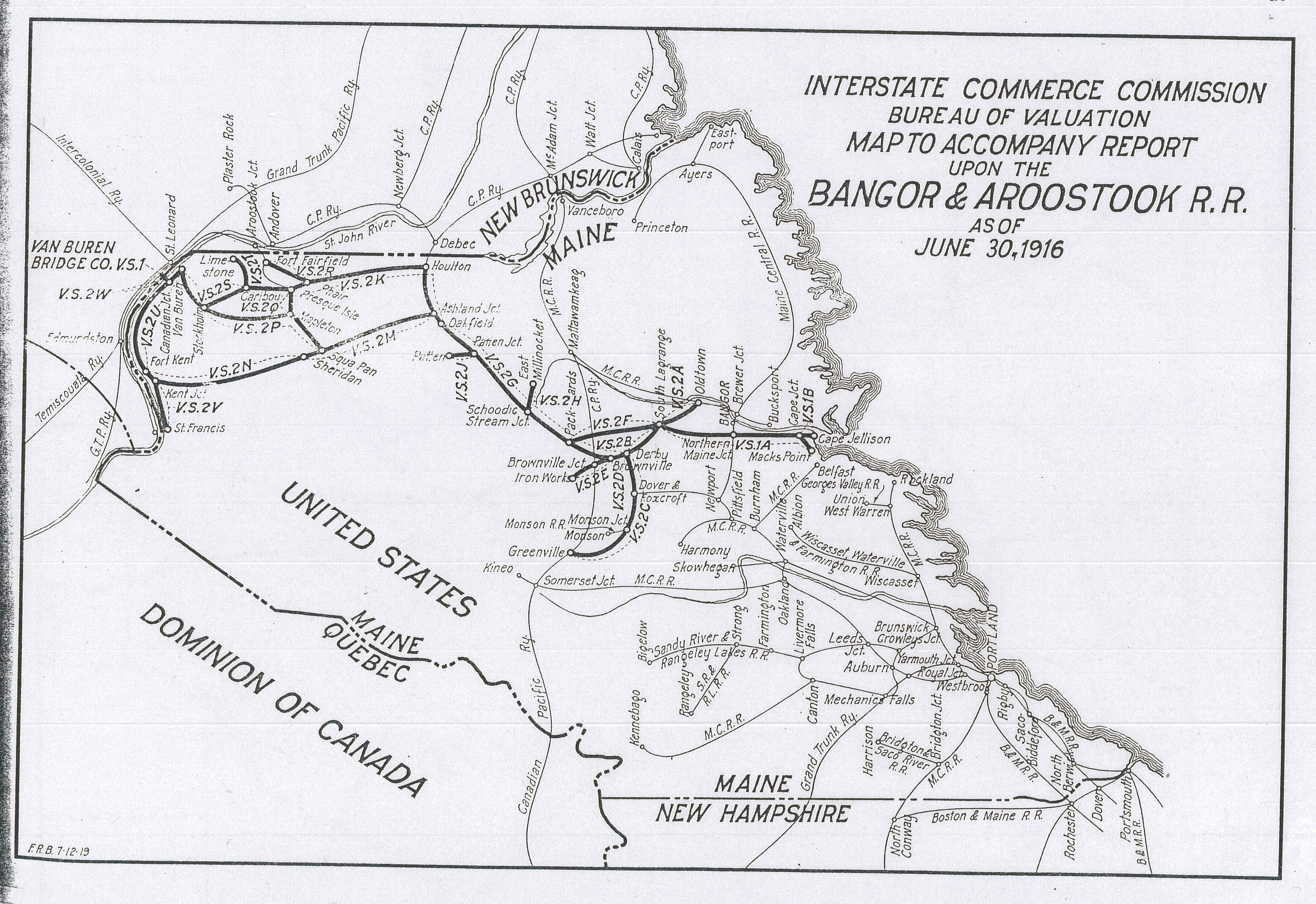
- System map, 1916

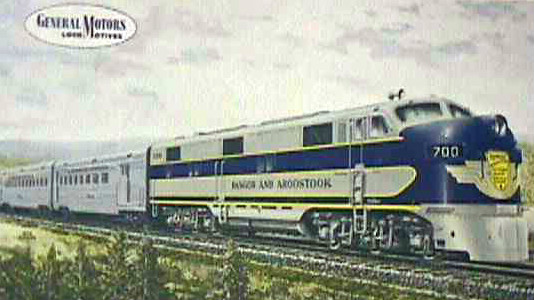
- The railroad's Aroostook Flyer passenger train, c. 1950s

Overview
- Headquarters: Bangor, Maine
- Reporting mark: BAR
- Locale: Maine
- Dates of operation: 1891–2003
- Successor: Montreal, Maine and Atlantic Railway

Technical
- Track gauge: 4 ft 8 1/2 in (1,435 mm)
- Length: 858 miles (1,381 km)

The Bangor and Aroostook Railroad (reporting mark BAR) was a United States railroad company that brought rail service to Aroostook County in northern Maine. Brightly-painted BAR boxcars attracted national attention in the 1950s. First-generation diesel locomotives operated on BAR until they were museum pieces. The economic downturn of the 1980s, coupled with the departure of heavy industry from northern Maine, forced the railroad to seek a buyer and end operations in 2003. It was succeeded by the Montreal, Maine and Atlantic Railway.

== History ==
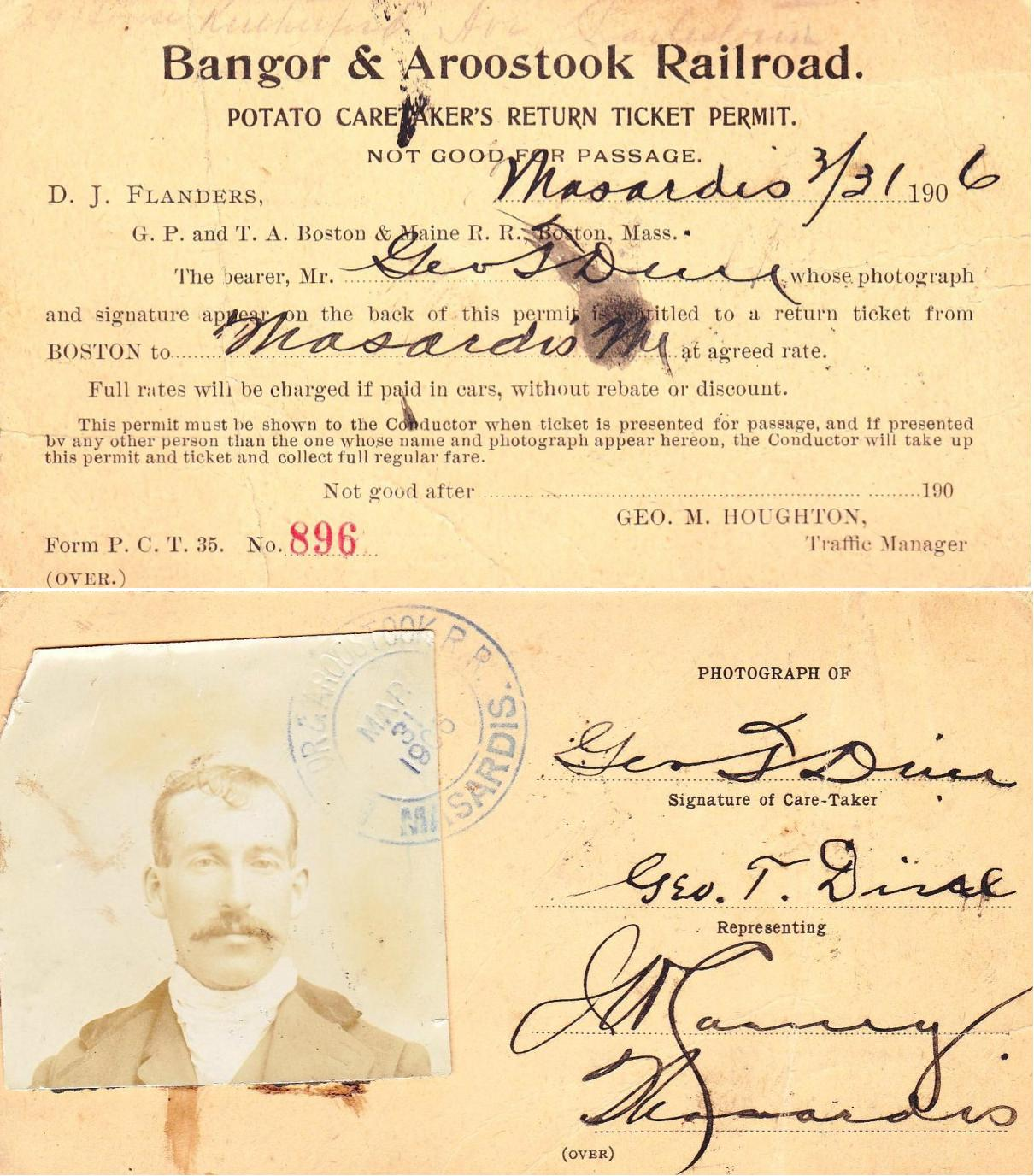
Potatoes were important enough to the railroad that men were hired to tend to them during shipment. This worker's pass entitled him to a trip back to his hometown.

The company was incorporated in 1891 to combine the lines of the former Bangor and Piscataquis Railroad and the Bangor and Katahdin Iron Works Railway. It was based in Bangor and lines extended from there to Oakfield and Houlton in 1894. The line was extended from Houlton to Fort Fairfield and Caribou in 1895. A parallel branch line was extended from Oakfield to Ashland in 1896. A branch was built from Caribou to Limestone in 1897, and the main line extended from Caribou to Van Buren in 1899. The Ashland Branch was extended to Fort Kent in 1902. A southern extension was completed in 1905 through Northern Maine Junction to Searsport on Penobscot Bay. The Medford Cutoff from Packard to South Lagrange was completed in 1907, and a branch was built from Millinocket to a new paper mill in East Millinocket. Rails were extended up the Maine side of the Saint John River from Van Buren through Madawaska and Fort Kent to St. Francis in 1910; and Mapleton was connected to Stockholm and Presque Isle on the main line, and to Squa Pan on the Ashland branch. An international bridge was constructed over the Saint John River between Van Buren and St. Leonard, NB in 1915 to connect with the Canadian Pacific Railway and National Transcontinental Railway (later merged into the Canadian National Railway).

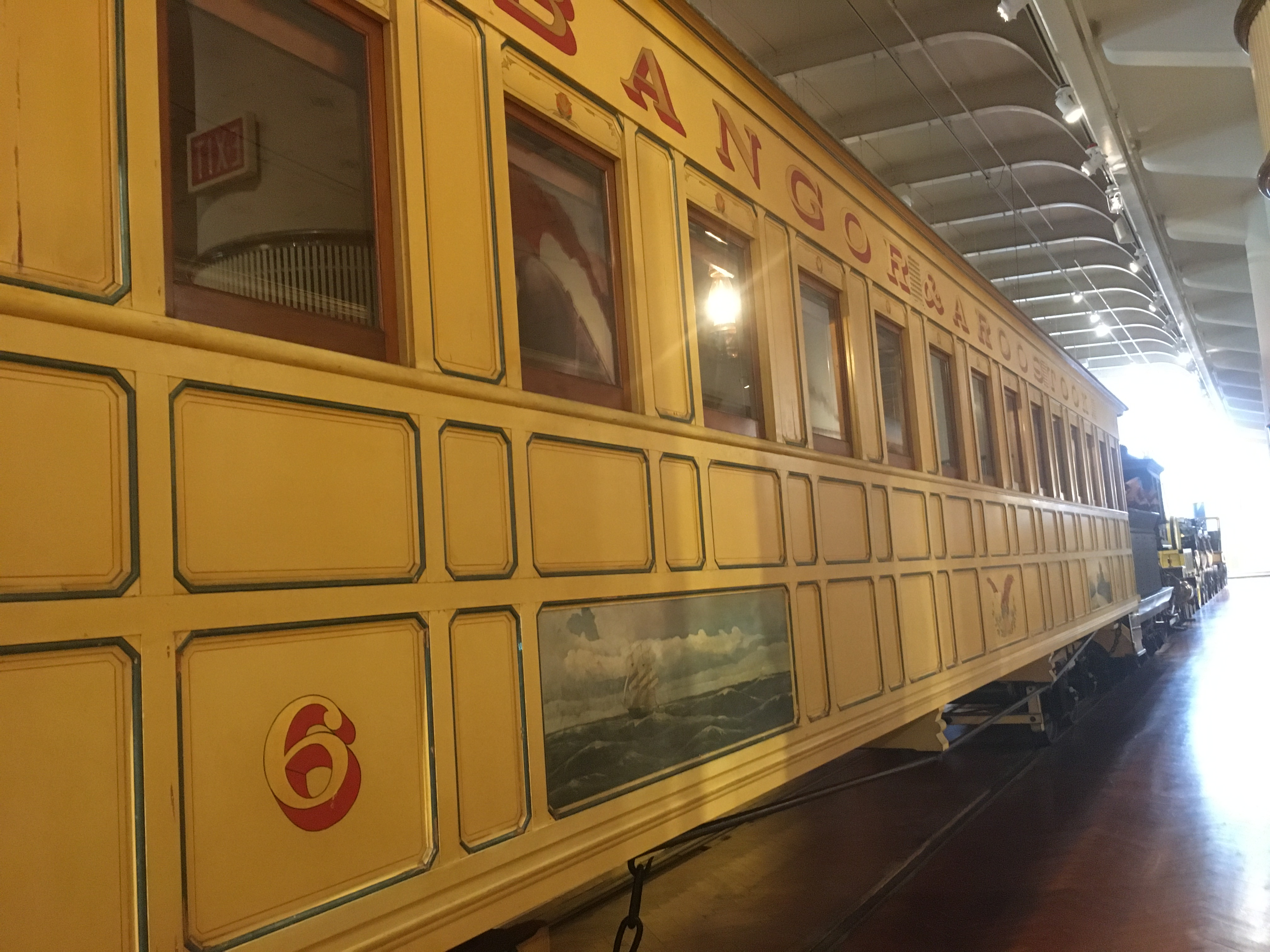
Bangor & Aroostook RR coach built in the 1800s, at the Henry Ford Museum in Dearborn, Michigan.

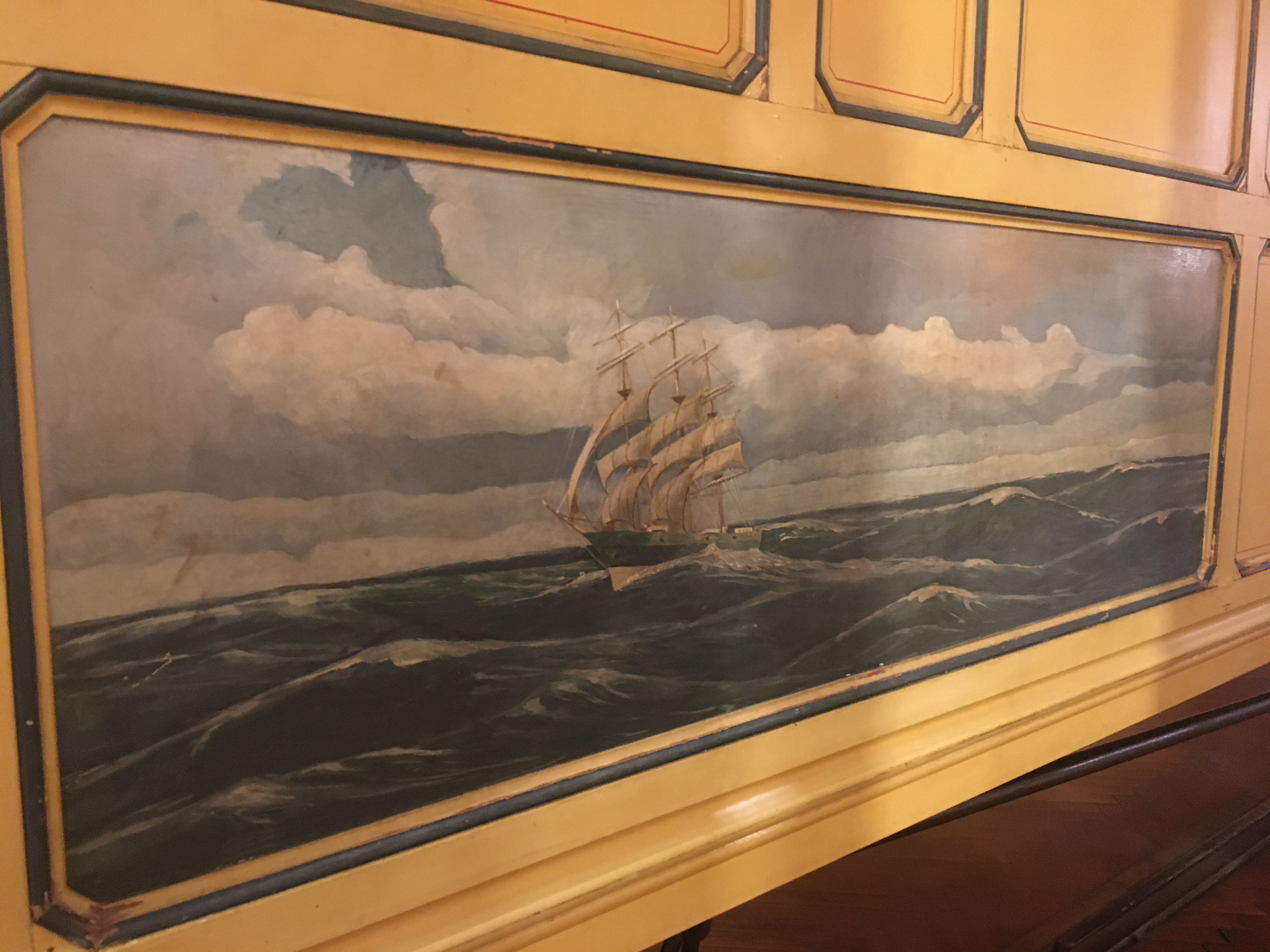
Detail showing artwork on the Bangor & Aroostook RR coach at the Henry Ford Museum.

BAR began hauling potatoes in heated boxcars in 1895. Potatoes provided a stable income source through the great depression, and provided 50% of the railroad's revenue following World War II. BAR had the second-largest United States railroad-owned reefer fleet (after Santa Fe) during the 1950s. BAR made an arrangement with Pacific Fruit Express whereby PFE reefers shipped Maine potatoes during winter months and BAR reefers carried California produce during the summer and autumn. While potatoes started moving by truck following completion of the Interstate Highway System into northern Maine in the 1960s, what actually resulted in the railroad losing its potato business forever was the Penn Central Transportation Company (PC), whose interchange service became so bad during the winter of 1969–70 that a large portion of the 1969 potato crop was spoiled by freezing when car heaters ran out of fuel. The claims process against PC was not resolved prior to PC's bankruptcy declaration the following June. As a result, several potato farms went out of business; those that survived distrusted rail service and never returned to using the railroad.

Inbound chemicals and outbound paper from mills on the Penobscot River at Millinocket and East Millinocket were major revenue sources for the BAR from 1900. Another paper mill was built in Madawaska in 1925. Pulpwood and wood chip shipment to the paper mills became increasingly important as potato loadings declined. The remote port facilities at Searsport were a preferred loading point for ammunition during World War II, and BAR transported heating coal and aircraft fuel to Loring AFB for Strategic Air Command bombers through the Cold War. BAR painted 2,500 boxcars in the red, white and blue colors of the US flag during the 1950s. A less-expensive oxide red paint scheme with large white reporting marks was adopted during the Vietnam War.

The line from Brownville Junction to Katahdin Iron Works was abandoned in 1922, but the rails remained in place until 1933.

== Passenger operations ==
Into the 1950s, the Bangor and Aroostook operated an afternoon train, the Aroostook Flyer, on the company's mainline from Bangor (where a connection could be made from the Boston & Maine's Penobscot from Boston), to Brownville, Sherman, Oakfield, Presque Isle, Caribou and concluding in Van Buren (opposite St. Leonard in New Brunswick). A morning train making local stops, the Potatoland, ran from Bangor, using the same route, but after Van Buren continued west to St. Francis.

Service (#9 north/#12 south, and also scheduled to meet the Penobscot) operated from Bangor to Derby, leaving the main route heading west to Greenville, whereupon it joined Canadian Pacific trackage to Megantic, Quebec on Lac Mégantic. Greenville served as a transfer point for connecting with east-west Atlantic Limited and other Canadian Pacific Railway service from Montreal to Saint John, New Brunswick, via Sherbrooke, Quebec. The company also offered service on an interior branch from Oakfield directly north to Fort Kent, a stop on the route to St. Francis.

== Postwar ==
BAR passenger train service ended in 1961. Bus service, which began in 1936, continued with buses lettered for Bangor and Aroostook running on Greyhound Lines schedules between Aroostook County and New York City's Port Authority Bus Terminal until 1984. The Greenville branch was dismantled from 1962 to 1964. Several Aroostook County segments were abandoned when potato traffic disappeared in the 1970s.

BAR merged with the Punta Alegre Sugar and Railroad Company to form Bangor Punta in 1964.

== Decline and sale ==
In 1995, the BAR was acquired by Iron Road Railways. In 2002, the company was declared bankrupt; the next year its lines were sold to Rail World, which initially incorporated them into its newly-formed Montreal, Maine & Atlantic Railway subsidiary. In 2010, the 133 miles (214 km) of track from Millinocket north to the Canada–US border were sold to the state of Maine for $20 million to be operated by Irving Oil's Maine Northern Railway. MM&A kept the line from the Millinocket paper mills south to Searsport; after its 2013 Lac-Mégantic derailment and bankruptcy, the line was sold to the Fortress Investment Group as the Central Maine and Quebec Railway (CMQ). In 2019 it was sold by CMQ to Canadian Pacific, as part of expanding its rail service into New England and the Maritime Provinces.

== Rolling stock ==
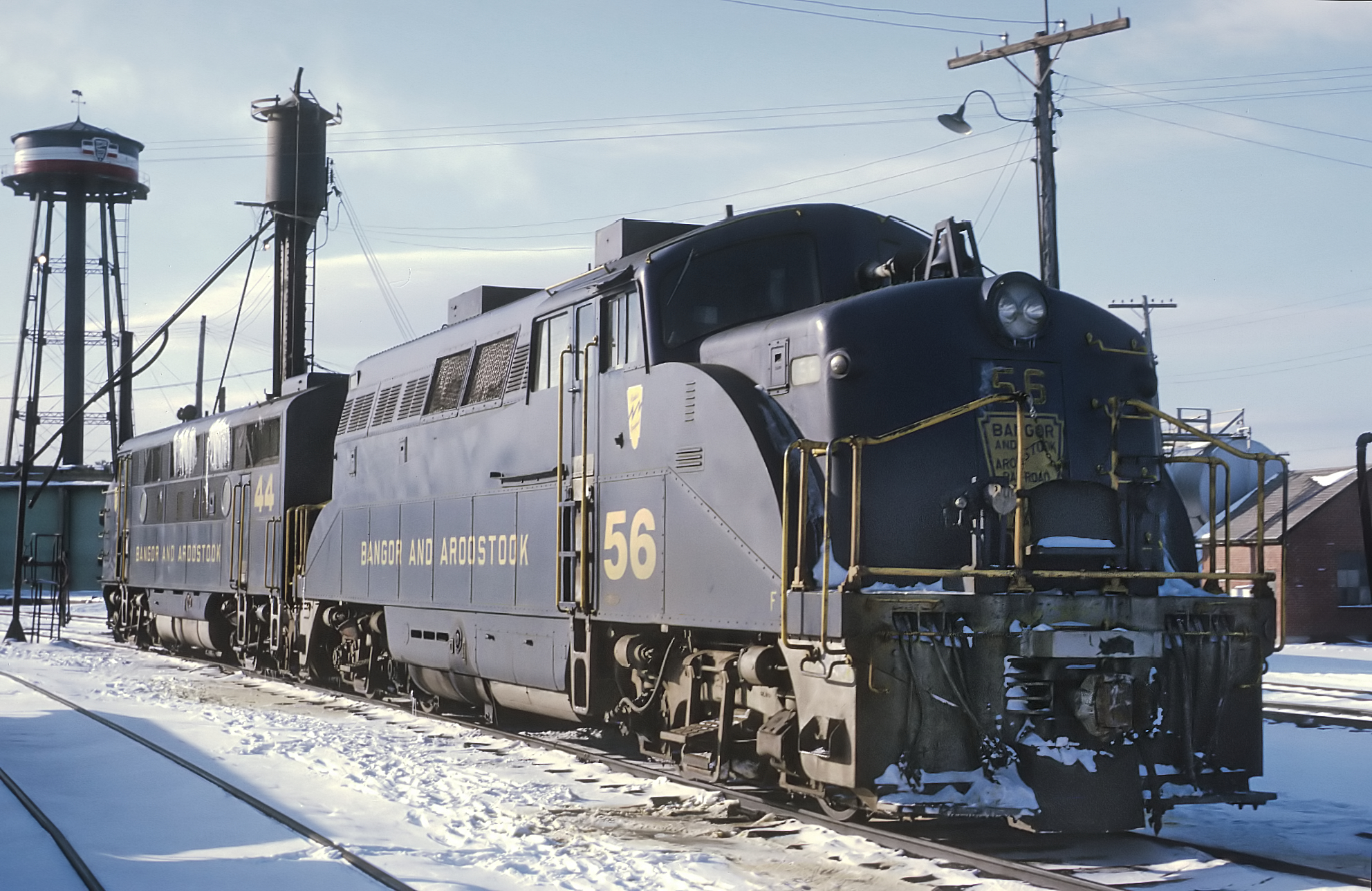
BAR EMD BL2 No. 56 at Northern Maine Junction in 1970

The Bangor and Aroostook rostered some 150 different steam locomotives over its history. Most were built by the Manchester Locomotive Works or the American Locomotive Company (ALCO), which absorbed Manchester in 1901. The most popular type was the 4-6-0, with nearly 60. Diesels began arriving in the late 1940s; general purpose types such as the EMD GP7 and EMD GP38 were common. Unusually, the BAR also rostered eight EMD BL2 "branch line" locomotives, precursors to EMD's GPs. Many first-generation diesels remained in operation on the BAR until they were museum pieces. In the 1950s its red, white, and blue boxcars attracted national attention.
