= Sainte-Rosalie =

Coordinates: 45°38′35″N 72°54′0″W

Sainte-Rosalie (French pronunciation: [sɛ̃t ʁozali]) is a former city in Quebec, Canada which was annexed to the town of Saint-Hyacinthe in 2002.

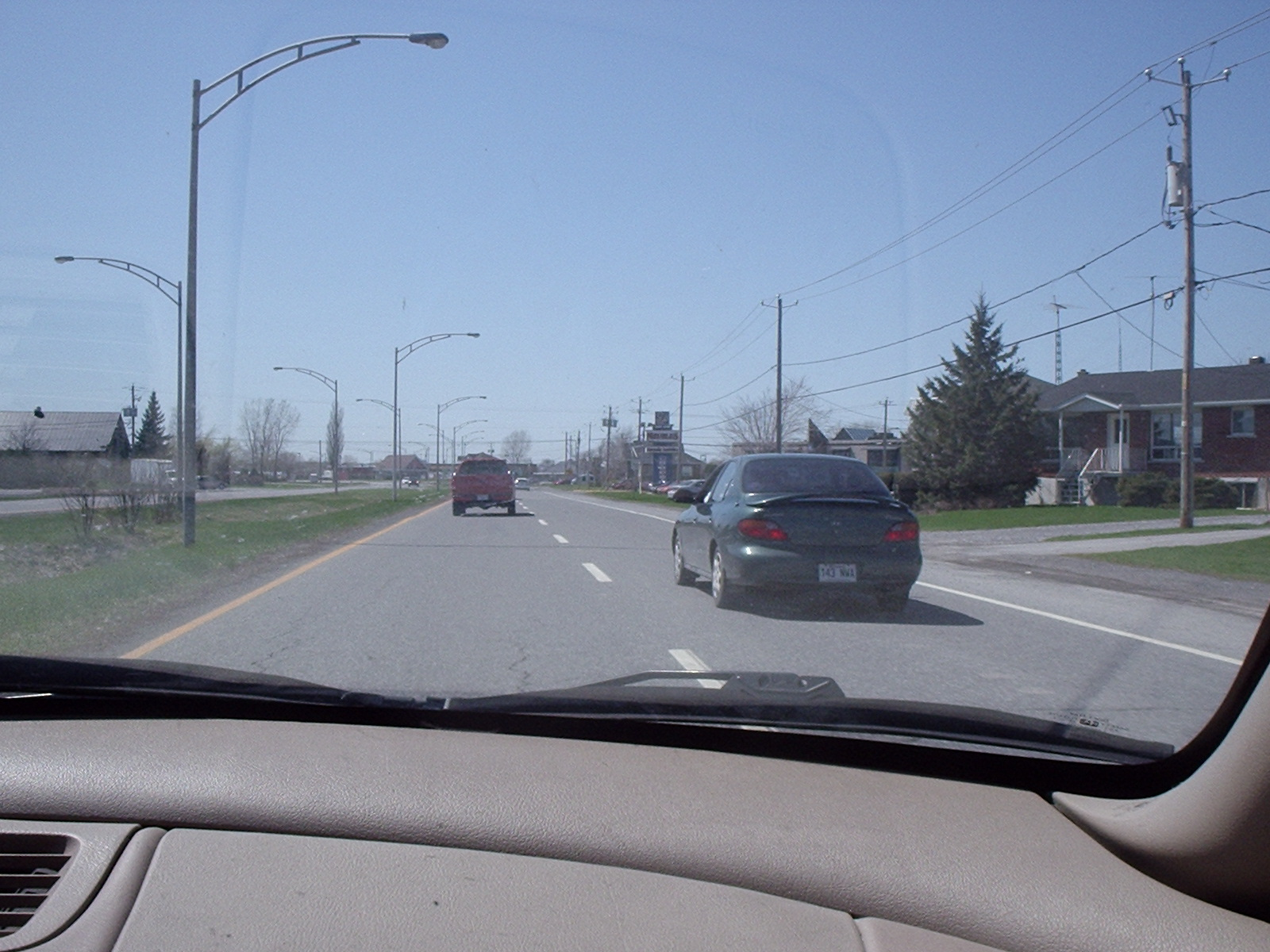
Laurier Boulevard, in the Sainte-Rosalie district of Saint-Hyacinthe. (April 2006)

== See also ==
- 2000–06 municipal reorganization in Quebec
- List of former cities in Quebec
