= Railroad Acquisition Holdings =

Railroad holding company

Railroad Acquisition Holdings, LLC
- Company type: Private
- Industry: Rail transport
- Founded: Wilmington, Delaware
- Headquarters: Wilmington, Delaware, United States
- Area served: United States and Canada
- Parent: Fortress Investment Group
- Subsidiaries: Florida East Coast Railway

Railroad Acquisition Holdings, LLC (RAH) is a railroad holding company which owns several railroads in the U.S. states of Florida, Maine, and Vermont, as well as the Canadian province of Quebec.

RAH was formed on December 10, 2013, and is a wholly owned subsidiary of Fortress Investment Group incorporated in Wilmington, Delaware.

== Subsidiaries ==
RAH owns the following subsidiaries:

- Florida East Coast Railway (reporting mark FEC) which operates between Jacksonville and Miami, Florida.
