= Embargo (rail) =

In the United States, an embargo is a halt to all traffic on a damaged section ("embargoed track") of a rail line not safely passable at any speed. Also, "to resist or prohibit the acceptance and handling of freight".

== Cases ==
Federal Railroad Administration embargoed Northwestern Pacific Railroad tracks in November 1998 and prevented the California Western Railroad from operating their passenger trips to Willits during the two weeks of Easter, because the California Western Railroad uses some of the Northwestern Pacific Railroad tracks coming in to Willits. Maintenance crews repaired the tracks, Federal Railroad Administration lifted the embargo in Willits and the summer schedule started as planned, with two daily trains from Fort Bragg and Willits to Northspur, the half-way point of the line.

Federal Railroad Administration closed a Northwestern Pacific Railroad route in 2001 after damage made it unsafe. North Coast Railroad Authority fixed the route, but tracks, bridges, signals and crossings must pass inspection before federal officials can lift their embargo. Sonoma-Marin Area Rail Transit planned to start running commuter trains over a portion of the railroad in 2014.

== Uses ==
"An embargo or halt of traffic by any party, freight or passenger, would have a severe impact on our daily commuter service and potentially any freight service utilizing Metrolink host territories."

"Furthermore, RailAmerica had owned the line for ten years at the time of the embargo and had clearly not made the basic investments necessary to ensure the line was safe for operation."

"That complaint alleged that Carolina Southern Railroad violated its legal obligation by initiating an 'embargo' on the line on Aug. 26, 2011, ceasing rail operations, and failing to either legally abandon the line or repair bridges that failed Federal Railroad Administration inspections"

"With UP running short of train crews, the railroad has issued more than 1,000 embargoes so far this year [2022] in response to congestion, compared with just 27 in 2017 — the year before it adopted a lean Precision Scheduled Railroading operating model. UP asked some of its carload customers to reduce their inventory of private cars or face the prospect of an embargo that would limit the flow of inbound empties."
