= Deferred maintenance =

Postponement of upkeep activities

Deferred maintenance is the practice of postponing maintenance activities such as repairs on both real property (i.e. infrastructure) and personal property (i.e. machinery) in order to save costs, meet budget funding levels, or realign available budget monies. The failure to perform needed repairs could lead to asset deterioration and ultimately asset impairment. Generally, a policy of continued deferred maintenance may result in higher costs, asset failure, and in some cases, health and safety implications.

== Technical vs. accounting ==
The technical community (e.g., engineers, facilities managers, and logisticians, etc.) makes distinctions between maintenance and repairs whereas accountants generally do not. Accountants typically look at maintenance and repairs as period costs requiring immediate expensing as opposed to capital improvements that become capitalized and depreciated over some future time period. The technical community often defines maintenance in terms of retaining an asset's functionality compared to repairs that restore an asset's functionality.

The accounting standard-setter for the U.S. Government (FASAB) defines deferred maintenance to also include deferred repairs thus: “Deferred maintenance and repairs” are maintenance and repair activities that were not performed when they should have been or were scheduled to be and which, therefore, are put off or delayed for a future period. Maintenance and repairs are activities directed toward keeping fixed assets in an acceptable condition. Activities include preventive maintenance; replacement of parts, systems, or components; and other activities needed to preserve or maintain the asset. Maintenance and repairs, as distinguished from capital improvements, exclude activities directed towards expanding the capacity of an asset or otherwise upgrading it to serve needs different from, or significantly greater than, its current use." (Statement of Federal Financial Accounting Standard 40)

== Examples ==
An example of deferred maintenance for a household would be putting off the recommended 1-year checkup on one's car, or putting off the repairs recommended at that checkup: the car will not run as smoothly or efficiently and will be more likely to break down or crash. The term is usually used in the context of large organizations or governments, however.

Maintenance competes for funding with other programs and is often deferred because appropriations are not available or were redirected to other priorities or projects.

Deferred maintenance is often not immediately reported—and sometimes, not at all. Maintenance which is deferred because of insufficient funding may result in increased safety hazards, poor service to the public, higher costs in the future, and inefficient operations.

On May 11, 2011 the Chairman of the Federal Accounting Standards Advisory Board (FASAB), Tom Allen, announced that the FASAB issued Statement of Federal Financial Accounting Standards (SFFAS) 40, Definitional Changes Related to Deferred Maintenance and Repairs: Amending Statement of Federal Financial Accounting Standards 6, Accounting for Property, Plant, and Equipment. SFFAS 40 represents a first step toward improved reporting on deferred maintenance and repairs. The Board is working, and will continue to work, closely with stakeholders interested in improved reporting on deferred maintenance and repairs. By addressing definitional issues as a first step, the Board will facilitate continued cooperation. Two areas in need of improvement relate to (1) the lack of comparability when assessing asset condition both within and among agencies and (2) measurement and reporting practices that vary greatly among agencies. These issues arise—in part—due to agencies having differing interpretations regarding the definition of “deferred maintenance” in SFFAS 6. “Redefining the term ’maintenance’ to include repair activities and better reflect asset management practices is an initial step in resolving the problems noted,” according to Chairman Allen. “However, the Board also plans to address measurement and reporting issues through continued consultation with stakeholders which could lead to the issuance of additional guidance and/or standards.

In December 2011 FASAB finalized statement of federal financial accounting standard #42, (SFFAS 42) amending existing standards regarding the measurement and reporting of deferred maintenance and repairs (DM&R). The principal changes in this SFFAS require federal entities to (1) describe the policies over maintenance and repairs (M&R) and the prioritization of M&R activities, (2) identify factors considered in determining acceptable condition standards, (3) identify the general property, plant and equipment (PP&E) and stewardship PP&E to which DM&R relates and provide the rationale for PP&E that may be excluded, (4) provide DM&R balances by category of PP&E, and (5) explain significant changes from the prior year.

== Submission ==
Pursuant to the FASAB Rules and Procedures, the proposed Statement has been submitted concurrently to the Director of the Office of Management and Budget, the Comptroller General, and the Secretary of the Treasury for a 90-day review. FASAB will announce it as a final FASAB Statement after the expiration of both review periods, unless otherwise informed within each of the respective review periods. The standards included in the Statement will be effective for fiscal periods beginning after September 30, 2014.

== See also ==
- Technical debt
