= Iron Road Railways =

Iron Road Railways Inc.
- Type: Private
- Industry: Rail transport
- Founded: Alexandria, Virginia
- Founder: Robert T. Schmidt, Benjamin F. Collins, John F. DePodesta, Daniel Sabin
- Headquarters: Alexandria, Virginia, United States
- Area served: United States and Canada
- Key people: Robert T. Schmidt (President)
- Subsidiaries: Canadian American Railroad, Bangor and Aroostook Railroad, Windsor and Hantsport Railway, Van Buren Bridge and Construction Company, Quebec Southern Railway, Northern Vermont Railroad, Iowa Northern Railway

Iron Road Railways Incorporated (IRR) was a railroad holding company which owned several short line railroads in the U.S. state of Maine, as well as the Canadian provinces of Quebec, New Brunswick and Nova Scotia.

IRR was formed in 1994 and headquartered in Alexandria, Virginia. Its president was Robert T. Schmidt and officers included Benjamin F. Collins, John F. DePodesta, and Daniel Sabin.

IRR owned the following subsidiaries:

== Subsidiaries ==
- Canadian American Railroad (CDAC) which operated between Brownville Junction, Maine and Lennoxville, Quebec. The 178 mi (286 km) line from Brownville Junction to Lennoxville was a former CP Rail mainline consisting of the Moosehead and Megantic subdivisions; at the time of acquisition it was operated by CP Rail as the Canadian Atlantic Railway. Operation was transferred by CP Rail to CDAC in early January 1995 and officially sold in March 1995. Canadian American Railroad was formed in 1994 as a joint venture by IRR (Alexandria, VA) and Fieldcrest Cannon Inc. (Kannapolis, NC); this joint venture lasted for 8 months in order to complete the acquisition of the former CP Rail property, at which time IRR purchased the interest of Fieldrest Cannon in CDAC to assume complete control. In 1996, CDAC was extended west by 60 mi (97 km) to Farnham, Quebec following purchase from CP Rail. At that time, CDAC received trackage rights from CP Rail over the remaining 40 mi (64 km) into Montreal.
- Bangor and Aroostook Railroad (BAR) operated between Searsport, Maine to Madawaska, Maine with branches to Van Buren, Caribou, Presque Isle, Limestone and Houlton. Sale of the 420 mi (680 km) system was finalized in March 1995 through a joint venture by IRR (Alexandria, VA) and Fieldcrest Cannon Inc. (Kannapolis, NC); this joint venture lasted for 8 months in order to complete the acquisition of the BAR property, at which time IRR purchased the interest of Fieldrest Cannon in order to assume complete control.
- Windsor and Hantsport Railway (WHR) which operated between Windsor Junction, Nova Scotia to New Minas, Nova Scotia with a branch from Windsor to Mantua. This was a portion of a former CP Rail subsidiary known as the Dominion Atlantic Railway. Sale of the 56 mi (90 km) system was completed on August 27, 1994.
- Van Buren Bridge and Construction Company (VBB) which operated between Cyr Junction, New Brunswick (south of St. Leonard) to Grand Falls, New Brunswick. This was a portion of the former CP Rail Edmundston subdivision that used trackage rights over CN to access interchange with BAR at the Van Buren - St. Leonard railroad bridge. VBB leased the 7 mi (11 km) line in March 1994.
- Quebec Southern Railway (QS) and Northern Vermont Railroad (NV), which operated between Brookport, Quebec and Wells River, Vermont. This was the former CP Rail Newport, Lyndonville and a portion of the Beebe subdivisions. Sale of the 144 mi (232 km) system was completed in September 1996 and extended service to the Vermont communities of Richford, Newport, St. Johnsbury and Lyndonville.
- Iowa Northern Railway (IANR), which operates between Cedar Rapids, Iowa and Manly, Iowa. IANR was formed in 1980 by several grain elevator operators to maintain rail service over a former Chicago, Rock Island and Pacific Railroad line while that company entered bankruptcy. The line was purchased by IANR in 1984 and the company was purchased by Iron Road Railways in 1994.

== 2002 bankruptcy and divestment ==
In 2002, IRR's "Bangor and Aroostook System" (BAR, CDAC, VBB, and QS/NV) entered bankruptcy protection and service became jeopardized. Both Canadian National and New Brunswick Southern Railway applied to the Surface Transportation Board for permission to operate former BAR lines that served major industrial customers in northern Maine. CN was granted permission to operate from Van Buren, Maine to Madawaska, Maine, while NBSR was granted permission to operate former BAR lines from Brownville Junction south to Searsport and north to Madawaska; neither applications became necessary after the BAR lines were sold.

The BAR, CDAC, and part of the QS/NV were sold in October 2002 to Rail World which reorganized the lines under its newly formed subsidiary Montreal, Maine & Atlantic Railway.

The NV south of Newport to Wells River, Vermont was purchased by the state of Vermont and operation contracted to Washington County Railroad.

The VBB had been operated on tracks leased from owner Canadian Pacific. In January 2003, Canadian Pacific sold this small line to Canadian National.

Former IRR president Robert T. Schmidt retained ownership of the Windsor and Hantsport Railway while another former IRR officer Daniel Sabin took ownership of the Iowa Northern Railway.
