= List of Quebec railways =

The following railways operate in the Canadian province of Quebec.

== Common freight carriers ==
Railway	Reporting marks	Notes
Arnaud Railway	CFAQ (Note: Formerly ARND and CFA.)	Chemin de fer Arnaud Quebec
Canadian National Railway	CN	includes subsidiaries Chaleur Bay Railway (CBC), Matapedia and Gulf Railway (CFMG), and lessor Chemin de fer de la Gaspésie
Canadian Pacific Railway	CP	
Cartier Railway	AMMC AMIC AMC (Note: Formerly CFC and QCM.)	
Charlevoix Railway	CFC	
Chemin de fer de l'Outaouais	CCFO	
Chemin de fer Lanaudière	CFL	
CSX Transportation	CSXT	
Ontario Northland Railway	ONT	through subsidiary Nipissing Central Railway
Ottawa Valley Railway	RLK	
Quebec Gatineau Railway	QGRY	
Quebec North Shore and Labrador Railway	QNSL	
Rio Tinto Fer et Titane		
Roberval and Saguenay Railway	RS	
Sartigan Railway	CFS	
St. Lawrence and Atlantic Railroad	SLQ	
Tshiuetin Rail Transportation	TSH	

== Private freight carriers ==
- Port of Montreal railway

== Passenger carriers ==
Railway	Reporting marks
Amtrak	AMTK
Exo commuter rail	EXO
Montreal Metro	
Old Quebec Funicular	
Réseau express métropolitain	REM
Tshiuetin Rail Transportation	TSH (formerly TRT)
Via Rail	VIA

== Defunct railways ==
Name	Reporting marks	System (Note: This is one or more of the major systems that the railroad became part of, if any.)	From	To	Successor	Notes
Asbestos and Danville Railway	ASDA		1897			
Atlantic and Lake Superior Railway			1893	1907	Quebec Oriental Railway	
Atlantic and North-West Railway		CP	1879			Still exists as a nonoperating subsidiary of the Canadian Pacific Railway
Atlantic, Quebec and Western Railway			1901	1929	Canadian National Railway	
Baie des Chaleurs Railway			1882	1894	Atlantic and Lake Superior Railway	
Beauharnois Junction Railway		GT	1873	1893	Grand Trunk Railway	
Boston, Concord and Montreal Railroad		B&M	1875	1878	South Eastern Railway	
Boston and Lowell Railroad		B&M	1887	1887	Boston and Maine Railroad	
Boston and Maine Railroad	B&M	B&M	1887	1926	Canadian Pacific Railway, Quebec Central Railway	
Canada Atlantic Railway		GT	1879	1914	Grand Trunk Railway	
Canada and Gulf Terminal Railway	CGT		1909			Still exists as a lessor of Canadian National Railway subsidiary Matapedia and Gulf Railway
Canadian American Railroad	CDAC		1995	2003	Montreal, Maine and Atlantic Railway	
Canadian Atlantic Railway		CP	1988	1994	Canadian American Railroad	
Canadian Government Railways	CGR	CGR	1915	1993	Canadian National Railway	
Canadian Northern Montreal Tunnel and Terminal Company		CNor	1911	1914	Mount Royal Tunnel and Terminal Company	
Canadian Northern Quebec Railway	CNQ	CNor	1906			Still exists as a subsidiary of the Canadian National Railway
Cap de la Madeleine Railway		CP	1895			
Carillon and Grenville Railway		CNor	1859	1914	Canadian Northern Quebec Railway	
Central Railway of Canada			1905			
Central Vermont Railroad		GT	1873	1899	Central Vermont Railway	
Central Vermont Railway	CV	GT	1899	1956	Canadian National Railway	
Champlain and St. Lawrence Railroad		GT	1832	1857	Montreal and Champlain Railroad	
Chateauguay and Northern Railway		CNor	1895	1906	Canadian Northern Quebec Railway	
Connecticut and Passumpsic Rivers Railroad		B&M	1870	1887	Boston and Lowell Railroad	
Consolidated Rail Corporation	CR		1976	1999	CSX Transportation	
Coteau and Province Line Railway and Bridge Company		GT	1872	1879	Canada Atlantic Railway	
Dessaulles Wooden Railway			1850	c.1861		Connected limestone quarries in St. Dominique, QC, to the Grand Trunk Railway at Britannia Mills.
Dominion Timber and Minerals Railway			1916	1981		Also known as the Canadian Refractories Railway
Drummond County Railway		CGR	1886	1899	Intercolonial Railway	
East Richelieu Valley Railway		D&H	1890	1900	Quebec Southern Railway	
Grand Trunk Railway	GT	GT	1852	1923	Canadian National Railway	
Great Eastern Railway			1882	1894	Atlantic and Lake Superior Railway	
Great Northern Railway of Canada		CNor	1883	1906	Canadian Northern Quebec Railway	
Hereford Railway		MEC	1888	1928	Canadian Pacific Railway	
Hereford Branch Railway		MEC	1887	1888	Hereford Railway	
Intercolonial Railway	IRC	CGR	1867	1993	Canadian National Railway	
International Railway		CP	1877	1886	Atlantic and North-West Railway	
Jacques Cartier Union Railway		GT	1880	1893	Grand Trunk Railway	
Joliette and Brandon Railway		CP	1905	1962	Canadian Pacific Railway	The section from St-Félix-de-Valois to St-Gabriel-de-Brandon was abandoned in 1983. The section from St-Félix-de-Valois to Joliette was sold by the Canadian Pacific Railway to the Chemin de fer Lanaudière in 1992 (see the reference for the Montreal and Lake Maskinongé Railway).
Joliette Railway Company		CP	1905	1962	Canadian Pacific Railway	The section from the village of Lanoraie to Joliette Jcn was abandoned in 1881. The remaining section from Joliette Jcn to the city of Joliette was sold by the Canadian Pacific Railway to the Chemin de fer Lanaudière in 1992. In 1997, it was acquired by the Quebec Gatineau Railway which is owned by Genesee & Wyoming Railroads Inc.
Lake Champlain and St. Lawrence Junction Railway		CP	1875			Still exists as a nonoperating subsidiary of the Canadian Pacific Railway
Lake St. Louis and Province Line Railway		GT	1847	1850	Montreal and New York Railroad	
Lake Temiscamingue Colonization Railway		CP	1886			
L'Epiphanie & L'Assomption Railway			1886	1903	abandoned	
Levis and Kennebec Railway		CP	1869	1881	Quebec Central Railway	
Lotbinière and Megantic Railway		CGR	1889	1920	Canadian Government Railways	
Lower Laurentian Railway		CNor	1888	1900	Great Northern Railway of Canada	
Maine Central Railroad		MEC	1890	1925	N/A	
Massawippi Valley Railway		B&M	1862			Still exists as a nonoperating subsidiary of the Canadian Pacific Railway
Matane and Gaspé Railway			1902	1909	Canada and Gulf Terminal Railway	
Matapedia Railway			1997	1999	Matapedia and Gulf Railway	
Missisquoi and Black Rivers Valley Railway		CP	1870	1881	Missisquoi Valley Railway	
Missisquoi and Clyde Rivers Railroad		CP	1869	1880	Newport and Richford Railroad	
Missisquoi Valley Railway		CP	1881			Still exists as a nonoperating subsidiary of the Canadian Pacific Railway
Montfort Colonization Railway		CNor	1890	1898	Montfort and Gatineau Colonization Railway	
Montfort and Gatineau Colonization Railway		CNor	1898	1902	Great Northern Railway of Canada	
Montreal and Atlantic Railway		CP	1891			Still exists as a nonoperating subsidiary of the Canadian Pacific Railway
Montreal and Bytown Railway		CNor	1853	1859	Carillon and Grenville Railway	
Montreal, Chambly and Sorel Railway		GT	1871	1875	Montreal, Portland and Boston Railway	
Montreal and Champlain Railroad		GT	1857	1872	Grand Trunk Railway	
Montreal and Champlain Junction Railway		GT	1870	1893	Grand Trunk Railway	
Montreal and City of Ottawa Junction Railway		GT	1871	1879	Canada Atlantic Railway	
Montreal and Lachine Railroad		GT	1846	1850	Montreal and New York Railroad	
Montreal and Lake Maskinonge Railway		CP	1887	1905	Joliette and Brandon Railway	
Montreal and New York Railroad		GT	1850	1857	Montreal and Champlain Railroad	
Montreal Northern Colonization Railway		CP	1869	1875	Montreal, Ottawa and Western Railway, Quebec, Montreal, Ottawa and Occidental Railway	
Montreal and Ottawa Railway		CP	1890	1958	Canadian Pacific Railway	
Montreal, Ottawa and Western Railway		CP	1875	1883	Montreal and Western Railway	
Montreal, Portland and Boston Railway		GT	1875	1896	Montreal and Province Line Railway	
Montreal and Province Line Railway		GT	1896			
Montreal and Sorel Railway		D&H	1881	1894	South Shore Railway	
Montreal and Southern Counties Railway		GT	1897	1957	Canadian National Railway	Electric until 1956
Montreal and Vermont Junction Railway		GT	1849	1956	Canadian National Railway	
Montreal and Western Railway		CP	1883		Canadian Pacific Railway	
Mount Royal Tunnel and Terminal Company		CNor	1914			
Napierville Junction Railway	NJ	D&H	1888			Still exists as a subsidiary of the Canadian Pacific Railway
National Transcontinental Railway		CGR	1903	1993	Canadian National Railway	
National Transcontinental Railway Branch Line Company		CN	1926	1954	Canadian National Railways	Closed in 1979 and dismantled in 1981.
New York Central Railroad	NYC	NYC	1914	1968	Penn Central Transportation Company	
New York Central and Hudson River Railroad		NYC	1898	1914	New York Central Railroad	
Newport and Richford Railroad		CP	1880	2003	Montreal, Maine and Atlantic Railway	
North Shore Railway		CP	1882	1885	Canadian Pacific Railway	
North Shore Railway		CP	1870	1875	Quebec, Montreal, Ottawa and Occidental Railway	
North Shore Railway		CP	1853	1858	North Shore Railway and St. Maurice Navigation Company	
North Shore Railway and St. Maurice Navigation Company		CP	1858	1858	North Shore Railway and St. Maurice Navigation and Land Company	
North Shore Railway and St. Maurice Navigation and Land Company		CP	1858	1870	North Shore Railway	
Northern Colonization Railway			1899	1956	Canadian Pacific Railway	
Ontario and Quebec Railway		CP	1871	1998	St. Lawrence and Hudson Railway	
Orford Mountain Railway		CP	1888	1958	Canadian Pacific Railway	
Ottawa and Gatineau Railway		CP	1894	1901	Ottawa, Northern and Western Railway	
Ottawa and Gatineau Valley Railway		CP	1871	1894	Ottawa and Gatineau Railway	
Ottawa Interprovincial Bridge Company		CP	1898			
Ottawa, Northern and Western Railway		CP	1901	1958	Canadian Pacific Railway	
Ottawa River Railway			1903	1905	Central Railway of Canada	
Ottawa Valley Railway			1892	1894	Atlantic and Lake Superior Railway	
Penn Central Transportation Company	PC		1968	1976	Consolidated Rail Corporation	
Philipsburg Railway and Quarry Company			1895			
Philipsburg, Farnham and Yamaska Railway		CP	1871	1875	Lake Champlain and St. Lawrence Junction Railway	
Philipsburg Junction Railway and Quarry Company			1888	1895	Philipsburg Railway and Quarry Company	
Pontiac Pacific Junction Railway		CP	1880	1903	Ottawa, Northern and Western Railway	
Pontiac and Renfrew Railway			1888	1894	N/A	
Quebec Railway, Light and Power Company	QL&P, QLP		1899	1951	Canadian National Railway	Electric until 1959
Quebec Bridge Company		CGR	1887	1903	Quebec Bridge and Railway Company	
Quebec Bridge and Railway Company		CGR	1903			
Quebec Central Railway	QC	CP	1875	2006	N/A	
Quebec and Gosford Railway	Q&GR		1868	1873	Quebec and Lake St. John Railway	
Quebec and James Bay Railway		CNor	1883	1897	Great Northern Railway of Canada	
Quebec and Lake St. John Railway	Q&LS	CNor	1869			Still exists as a subsidiary of the Canadian National Railway
Quebec, Montmorency and Charlevoix Railway			1881	1899	Quebec Railway, Light and Power Company	
Quebec, Montreal, Ottawa and Occidental Railway		CP	1875	1882	Canadian Pacific Railway, North Shore Railway	
Quebec, Montreal and Southern Railway	QM&S	D&H	1906	1929	Canadian National Railway	
Quebec, New Brunswick and Nova Scotia Railway		CNor	1903	1906	Canadian Northern Quebec Railway	
Quebec Oriental Railway			1903	1929	Canadian National Railway	
Quebec and Richmond Railway		GT	1850	1853	Grand Trunk Railway	
Quebec and Saguenay Railway		CGR	1905	1919	Canadian Government Railways	
Quebec Southern Railway	QSR		1996	2003	Montreal, Maine and Atlantic Railway	
Quebec Southern Railway		D&H	1900	1906	Quebec, Montreal and Southern Railway	
Quebec and Western Railway		CP	1924			Still exists as a subsidiary of the Canadian Pacific Railway
Richelieu, Drummond and Arthabaska Counties Railway	RD&ACRW	CP	1869	1872	South Eastern Railway	
Rouyn Mines Railway		CN	1925	1926	National Transcontinental Railway Branch Line Company	
Rutland Railroad	R, RUT	R	1901	1934	N/A	
Rutland and Noyan Railway		R	1899	1934	N/A	A very short railroad of some 6 km, between a point on the US Border north of Alburgh VT and Noyan QC.
St. Francis and Megantic International Railway		CP	1870	1877	International Railway	
St. Lawrence and Adirondack Railway		NYC	1888			Still exists as a nonoperating subsidiary of CSX Transportation
St. Lawrence and Atlantic Railroad		GT	1845	1853	Grand Trunk Railway	
St. Lawrence and Hudson Railway	STLH	CP	1996	2001	Canadian Pacific Railway	
St. Lawrence, Lower Laurentian and Saguenay Railway		CNor	1878	1888	Lower Laurentian Railway	
St. Lawrence and Industry Village Railway		CP	1847	1879	Joliette Railway Company	
St. Maurice Railway and Navigation Company		CP	1857	1858	North Shore Railway and St. Maurice Navigation Company	
St. Maurice Valley Railway		CP	1904	1958	Canadian Pacific Railway	
Shawinigan Falls Terminal Railway			1902			Electric until the 1950s; still exists as a joint subsidiary of the Canadian National Railway and Canadian Pacific Railway
Sherbrooke, Eastern Townships and Kennebec Railway		CP	1869	1875	Quebec Central Railway	
South Shore Railway		D&H	1894	1902	Quebec Southern Railway	
South Eastern Railway		CP	1872	1891	Montreal and Atlantic Railway	
South Eastern Counties Junction Railway		CP	1866	1872	South Eastern Railway	
Southwestern Railway		NYC	1888	1896	St. Lawrence and Adirondack Railway	
Stanstead, Shefford and Chambly Railroad		GT	1853	1956	Canadian National Railway	
Temiscouata Railway	TMC		1885	1949	Canadian National Railway	
Trans-Ontario Railway	TOR		1996	1997	Ottawa Valley Railway	
United Counties Railway		D&H	1883	1900	Quebec Southern Railway	
Vaudreuil and Prescott Railway		CP	1884	1890	Montreal and Ottawa Railway	
Vermont Central Railroad		GT		1873	Central Vermont Railroad	
Waterloo and Magog Railway		CP	1871	1888	Atlantic and North-West Railway	

=== Electric ===
Hull Electric Company	
Montreal and Southern Counties Railway	
Montreal Island Belt Line Railway	
Montreal, Maine and Atlantic Railway	MMA
Montreal Terminal Railway	
Quebec District Railway	
Quebec Railway, Light and Power Company	QL&P, QLP
Shawinigan Falls Terminal Railway	
Quebec Railway Corporation	QRC; through subsidiary Charlevoix Railway
