= List of defunct Canadian railways =

Most transportation historians date the history of Canada's railways as beginning on February 25, 1832, with the incorporation of British North America's first steam-powered railway, the Champlain and St. Lawrence Railroad (C&SL). This line opened for traffic on July 21, 1836, although there are cases of animal-drawn mining tramways in Nova Scotia from the 18th century onward.

Thousands of railways followed the C&SL and were given a charter by the federal or provincial governments, although in most cases these charters never resulted in an actual line being constructed. Many of these charters were so-called "paper railways" and were absorbed into other railways, that is they existed on paper with the actual trains bearing the name of another railway or system of railways. For example, Canadian National Railways alone consisted of over some 400 railways (see List of Canadian National Railways companies).

The reason for these "paper" railways was the ease of getting a charter. This was often done by a major railway such as Canadian Pacific Railway or Grand Trunk Railway, but the true interests were kept hidden to keep attention away from the efforts of competing major railways to gain access to another's territory. In other instances local interests wanted a railway to connect their community with the main line of a major railway that did not enter their town, or to connect to another major railway for competitive reasons, to get lower freight rates, something that remains to this day. In many cases these local efforts were quickly taken over by a major railway to both expand its own network and to deny its competition access to traffic.

Streetcar and interurban railways were chartered provincially, in the case of Ontario under the Street Railway Act.

Railways that were not common carriers did not require a charter under the Railway Act since they were used primarily for the owners' own purposes, mainly logging and mining.

American railroads always operated in Canada under charters of subsidiary railways even though most had equipment lettered only for the parent company. Most U.S. railroads also operated in Canada through subsidiary railways with one exception: Wabash Railway which had not a mile of track in Canada as it crossed southern Ontario using trackage rights granted by the Grand Trunk Railway of Canada. These rights still exist with present-day Canadian National and Norfolk Southern, which runs into Windsor and Sarnia, Ontario. It formerly ran through Montreal, Quebec, but service was stopped due to such services causing traffic congestion.

This list of defunct railways includes only those railways that actually came into existence. Many were taken over by other railways or had a name change and thus continued to operate trains over the same tracks. A few ceased to exist because they went out of business and were abandoned and dismantled.

For simplicity on this list, Canadian National Railways (CNR) (pre-1960), Canadian National Railway (CN) (post-1960), Canadian Pacific Railway (CPR), Grand Trunk Railway (GTR), and Canadian Northern Railway (CNoR) will be abbreviated for notations. Others will be abbreviated as required.

Also consult the list of active Canadian railways.

== A ==
Railway name	Locale	Operating years	Comments
Alberta Railway and Navigation Company	Lethbridge, Alberta to Great Falls, Montana	1889–1912	Acquired by CPR.
Alberta and Great Waterways Railway	Alberta, British Columbia	1929–1981	Acquired by NAR.
Albion Mines Railway	Pictou County, Nova Scotia	1829–c.1890	First railway and first use of metal rails in British North America; horse-drawn until 1838. Abandoned.
Algoma Central Railway	Algoma and Cochrane Districts, Northeastern Ontario	1899–1995	Acquired by WC.
Algoma Eastern Railway	Algoma and Sudbury Districts, Northeastern Ontario	1911–1930	Acquired by CPR on July 14, 1931 by 999-year lease.
Alma and Jonquières Railway	Herbertville, Quebec and Lake St. John to a point between Grand Decharge and Petite Decharge and from St. Joseph d'Alma to Jonquière	1912–1937	Merged into RS.
Athabasca Northern Railway	Alberta	2000–2007	Reacquired by CN.
Atlantic and North-West Railway	southeastern Quebec, central Maine		Acquired by CPR.
Atlantic, Quebec and Western Railway	Gaspé Peninsula, Quebec	1907–1923	Acquired by CNR.

== B ==
Railway name	Locale	Operating years	Comments
Bay of Quinte Railway	southeastern Ontario	1897–1910	Acquired by CNoR.
Berlin and Waterloo Street Railway	Kitchener and Waterloo, Ontario	1889–1919	Continued operations and renamed to Kitchener and Waterloo Street Railway.
Botwood Railway	central Newfoundland	1908-1956	Subsidiary of AND. Sold to become GFC.
Brantford, Hamilton and Western Railway			
British Columbia Electric Railway			Owned by BCH. Sold to become SRY.
British Columbia Railway	British Columbia	1972–2004	Acquired by CN.
Brockville and Ottawa Railway	eastern Ontario		Acquired by CPR.
Brockville, Westport and North-Western Railway	eastern Ontario		Acquired by CNoR.
Bruce Mines and Algoma Railway			
Buchans Railway	central Newfoundland		Owned by ASARCO. Abandoned.
Buctouche and Moncton Railway	southeastern New Brunswick		Acquired by CNR.
Burlington Northern Manitoba Limited	central Manitoba	1971–1999	Subsidiary of BN. Renamed to BNSFM.
Bytown and Prescott Railway	eastern Ontario	1854–1884	Leased by CPR for 999 years. Abandoned in 1995.

== C ==
Railway name	Locale	Operating years	Comments
Canada and Gulf Terminal Railway	eastern Quebec	?-1975	Acquired by CN.
Calgary and Edmonton Railway			Acquired by CPR.
Campbellford, Lake Ontario and Western Railway			Acquired by CPR.
Canada Air Line Railway			Subsidiary of GWR.
Canada Atlantic Railway	central, eastern Ontario, western Quebec	1890–1914	Acquired by GTR.
Canadian Atlantic Railway	Quebec via Maine to New Brunswick	1988–1994	Part of CPR mainline east of Lac-Mégantic, divested 1994 as Canadian American Railroad (bankrupt 2001) and later MM&A (bankrupt 2013). Portion east of Brownville is Irving's New Brunswick Southern Railway.
Canadian American Railroad	Quebec to Maine	1994–2002	Iron Road Railways segment of CP's former Canadian Atlantic Railway from Lennoxville to Brownville, Maine, bankrupt 2001.
Canadian Pacific	British Columbia, Alberta, Saskatchewan, Manitoba, Ontario, Quebec	1881–2023	Acquired and Merged with the Kansas City Southern Railroad to form CPKC.
Canada Central Railway			Acquired by Canadian Pacific.
Canada Coal and Railroad Company	northwestern Nova Scotia	1905–1906	Sold to become MCR&PC.
Canada Coals and Railway Company	northwestern Nova Scotia	1892–1905	Sold to become CC&RC.
Canada Southern Railway			Acquired by MCRR, later NYC. Sold to CPR and CN. Abandoned.
Canadian Atlantic Railway	eastern Quebec, Maine, western New Brunswick, western Nova Scotia	1988–1994	CPR subsidiary created to operate lines east of Montreal including DAR. Portions abandoned or sold by 1994 to NBSR, EMR, CDAC, and WHRC.
Canadian Government Railways	Maritimes, Quebec, Ontario, Manitoba	1915–1918	Entrusted to CNR. Corporate entity sold to CN in 1993 for $1.
Canadian National Electric Railways			Division of CNR.
Canadian Pacific Electric Lines			Division of CPR.
Canadian Northern Railway	Nova Scotia, Quebec to British Columbia	1899–1918	Nationalized into CNR.
Canadian Northern Alberta Railway			Constituent company of CNoR.
Canadian Northern Branchlines Company			Constituent company of CNoR.
Canadian Northern Consolidated Railways			Constituent company of CNoR.
Canadian Northern Manitoba Railway			Constituent company of CNoR.
Canadian Northern Montreal Tunnel and Terminal Company			Constituent company of CNoR.
Canadian Northern Ontario Railway			Constituent company of CNoR.
Canadian Northern Pacific Railway			Constituent company of CNoR.
Canadian Northern Quebec Railway			Constituent company of CNoR.
Canadian Northern Saskatchewan Railway			Constituent company of CNoR.
Canadian Northern Western Railway			Constituent company of CNoR.
Cape Breton Development Corporation Railway			Sold to SCR.
Cape Breton Railway			
Cape Breton Eastern Extension Railway	Stellarton to Sydney, NS	1890	Constituent part of IRC
Caraquet Railway	northeastern New Brunswick		Acquired by CNR.
Central Canada Railway			
Central Maine and Quebec Railway	Quebec, Maine, Vermont	2014-2020	Acquired by Canadian Pacific Railway
Central Ontario Railway			Acquired by CNoR.
Central Railway of New Brunswick			Acquired by CPR.
Central Vermont Railway			Also a defunct U.S. railroad. Subsidiary of GTR, later CNR. Became NECR.
Champlain and St. Lawrence Railroad	southwestern Quebec	1836–1857	First common carrier railway in British North America. Acquired by M&CR.
Chatham, Wallaceburg and Lake Erie Railway			Interurban railway.
Columbia and Kootenay Railway			Acquired by CPR.
Columbia and Western Railway			Acquired by CPR.
Cornwallis Valley Railway	Kentville to Kingsport, NS	1890-1892	Acquired by W&AR.
Credit Valley Railway	Toronto to St. Thomas, ON		Acquired by CPR.
Cumberland Railway and Coal Company	Springhill Junction to Parrsboro, NS	1883-1962	Abandoned.

== D ==
Railway name	Locale	Operating years	Comments
Detroit River Tunnel Company			Subsidiary of CASO/MCRR.
Devco Railway	Cape Breton, NS	1968-2001	Former DOSCO coal hauler, assets acquired by Sydney Coal Railway
Dominion Atlantic Railway	western Nova Scotia	1894–1994	Acquired by CPR in 1912, after 1988 was operated as part of CAR. Sold to become WHRC.
Dominion Coal Company			
Dominion Timber and Minerals Railway	Laurentian Mountains (Western Quebec) Kilmar, Black Lake, Lachute, Marlean	1916-1981	Subsidiary of CRL.
Duluth, Winnipeg and Pacific Railway	Minnesota to Winnipeg Manitoba / Port Arthur ON		Originally a CNoR railway by the name of Duluth, Rainy Lake and Winnipeg Railway. Now a subsidiary of CN - by way of GT and then merged with WC (both are CN companies).

== E ==
Railway name	Locale	Operating years	Comments
Edmonton, Dunvegan and British Columbia Railway			Acquired by NAR.
Edmonton Interurban Railway	St Albert to Edmonton	September 1913 - April 1914	Abandoned after car barn burned down. Rails dismantled in 1917 and sold for scrap.
Edmonton Yukon and Pacific Railway			Acquired by CNoR.
Elgin and Havelock Railway	central New Brunswick		Acquired by CGR.
Erie and Ontario Railway			Acquired by CASO.
Esquimalt and Nanaimo Railway			Acquired by CPR. Sold 2006 to become Southern Railway of Vancouver Island.
European and North American Railway	southern New Brunswick	1857–1872	Eastern extension merged into IRC. Western extension became part of NBR.
Englewood Railway	Northern Vancouver Island	1917-2017	Sold to Western Forest Products 2006.

== F ==
Railway name	Locale	Operating years	Comments
Fredericton and Grand Lake Railway	central and western New Brunswick		Acquired by CPR.

== G ==
Railway name	Locale	Operating years	Comments
Galt and Preston Street Railway	Cambridge, Ontario	1894–1908	Renamed the Galt, Preston, and Hespeler Street Railway after Hespeler line was built.
Galt, Preston and Hespeler Street Railway	Cambridge, Ontario	1894–1908	Merged into the Berlin, Waterloo, Wellesley, and Lake Huron Railway.
Georgian Bay and Seaboard Railway			Acquired by CPR.
Glengarry and Stormont Railway			
Grand Falls Central Railway	central Newfoundland	1956–1977	Abandoned.
Grand River Railway	Waterloo Region, Ontario	1914–1931	Acquired by CPR, merged into CPEL.
Grand Trunk Pacific Railway	Manitoba, Saskatchewan, Alberta, British Columbia	1914–1920	Nationalized into CNR.
Grand Trunk Railway	Ontario, Quebec, New England	1852–1923	Nationalized into CNR.
Great North West Central Railway			Acquired by CPR.
Great Northern Railway (U.S.)			A trans U.S. railway that had a railway in the BC Fraser Valley competing with CP for the natural resources.
Great Northern Railway of Canada		1892-1907	between Rivière-à-Pierre, Quebec, and Hawkesbury, Ontario
Great Western Railway	southwestern Ontario	1853–1884	Acquired by GTR
Guelph and Goderich Railway			Acquired by CPR.
Gunflint and Lake Superior Railroad	Lakehead Region (Ontario and Minnesota)	1902–1909	

== H ==
Railway name	Locale	Operating years	Comments
Halifax and South Western Railway	southwestern Nova Scotia	1901–1918	Merged into CNoR, nationalized by CNR.
Halifax City Railroad	Halifax, Nova Scotia	1866-1876	Horse-drawn operations; assets acquired by Halifax Street Railway Company, 1886.
Halifax Electric Tramway	Halifax, Nova Scotia	1895-1917	Acquired by Nova Scotia Tramways and Power Company, Limited in 1917.
Halifax Street Railway	Halifax, Nova Scotia	1886-1895	Became Nova Scotia Power Company in 1889.
Hamilton, Grimsby and Beamsville Electric Railway	Hamilton-Niagara Peninsula, Ontario	1894 - 1931	interurban railway.
Hamilton and North-Western Railway			Acquired by GTR.
Hamilton Radial Electric Railway			
Harpoon Logging Railway	central Newfoundland		
Hudson Bay Railway			Charter acquired by CNoR, subsequently built by CNR.
Huntsville and Lake of Bays Railway			Portage railway.

== I ==
Railway name	Locale	Operating years	Comments
Inverness Railway and Coal Company			Acquired by CNoR.
Intercolonial Railway of Canada	Quebec City to Halifax	1872-1918	Operated by CGR, entrusted to CNR.
International Railway			Acquired by CPR.
Irondale, Bancroft and Ottawa Railway			Acquired by CNoR.

== J ==
Railway name	Locale	Operating years	Comments
Joggins Railway	northwestern Nova Scotia	1883–1892	Sold to become CC&RC.

== K ==
Railway name	Locale	Operating years	Comments
Kaslo and Slocan Railway	Kaslo BC to Slocan BC, Central Kootenay Region	1895-1955	Acquired by CPR.
Kelowna Pacific Railway	Okanagan Valley, British Columbia	1999 - 2013	Entered receivership July 2013. CN once again operates a portion of the line. The Vernon to Kelowna portion is under abandonment procedures.
Kettle Valley Railway	Midway BC to Hope BC, Southern Interior Route	1915–1961, all except Penticton area until 1989	Acquired by CPR.
Kingston and Pembroke Railway	Kingston to Renfrew	1884-1913	Acquired by CPR, dismantled 1950s.
Kitchener and Waterloo Street Railway	Kitchener and Waterloo, Ontario	1919–1927	Continuation of Berlin and Waterloo Street Railway. Taken over and municipalized by the City of Kitchener under its Public Utilities Commission.

== L ==
Railway name	Locale	Operating years	Comments
Lake Champlain and St. Lawrence Junction Railway	Richelieu River valley of southeastern Quebec	1879–1880	Leased to the South Eastern Railway 1880. Acquired by CPR 1887.
Lake Erie and Detroit Railway			Subsidiary of PM, later C&O. Abandoned.
Lake Erie and Northern Railway			Acquired by CPR, merged into CPEL.
Lake Manitoba Railway and Canal Company			Acquired by CNoR.
Laurentian Railway			Lower Laurentian acquired by Great Northern of Canada, later by CNoR.
Lindsay, Bobcaygeon and Pontypool Railway			Acquired by CPR by 999-year lease.
London and Lake Erie Railway and Transportation Company	Southwestern Ontario	1909–1918	Abandoned - Formerly South Western Traction Company.
London and Port Stanley Railway	southwestern Ontario	1853–1965	Acquired by CN.
Lotbinière and Megantic Railway	Saint-Jean-Deschaillons, Sainte-Philomène and Lyster (Mégantic)	1889-1909	Merged to Quebec Railway, Light, Heat and Power Co (QRLHP), acquired by CGR.

== M ==
Railway name	Locale	Operating years	Comments
Maine Central Railroad	southwestern New Brunswick		Sold and renamed GRS/ST.
Manitoba Great Northern Railway			Subsidiary of GN.
Manitoba and North Western Railway			Acquired by CPR.
Manitoulin and North Shore Railway	Northeastern Ontario		Reorganized as Algoma Eastern Railway, subsequently largely abandoned.
Maritime Coal Railway and Power Company	northwestern Nova Scotia	1906–1961	Abandoned.
Massawippi Valley Railway	Eastern Townships of Quebec	1870-1990	Leased by Quebec Central Railway (CPR) 1926–1990, abandoned, tracks removed 1992.
Mattagami Railroad	Northeastern Ontario	1927-1998	Acquired by Ontario Northland
Metropolitan Electric Railway			
Michigan Central Railroad			Operated in Canada as CASO.
Midland Railway of Canada			Acquired by GTR.
Midland Railway (Canada)	Hants County NS	1901-1905	Acquired by DAR.
Midland Railway of Manitoba			Subsidiary of GN; became Burlington Northern Manitoba Ltd. in 1971, now Burlington Northern Santa Fe Manitoba.
Millertown Railway			Subsidiary of AND. Abandoned.
Montreal and Champlain Railroad		1857–1872	Acquired by GTR.
Montreal and Ottawa Railway			Acquired by CPR. CP operates to Rigaud, line from Rigaud to Ottawa abandoned and sold to Via Rail.
Montreal and Vermont Junction Railway			Acquired by CNR.
Montreal, Maine and Atlantic Railway	Farnham, Quebec/Brownville, Maine	2003-2013	Sold in bankruptcy to Fortress Investments as Central Maine and Quebec Railway
Montreal Tramways Company			
Montreal Suburban Tramway and Power			Owned Dominion Park
Morrissey Fernie and Michel Railway			Subsidiary of CPCC.

== N ==
Railway name	Locale	Operating years	Comments
Nakusp and Slocan Railway			Acquired by CPR.
Napierville Junction Railway	Rouses Point, NY to Delson Jct. QC		Subsidiary of DH.
National Transcontinental Railway	Manitoba, Ontario, Quebec, New Brunswick	1912–1918	Operated by CGR, entrusted to CNR.
Nelson and Fort Sheppard Railway	Troup BC to Ft Sheppard BC	1893-1993	Acquired by GN Fruitvale to US border still in use for Atco Forest Products.
New Brunswick Coal and Railway			Acquired by CPR.
New Brunswick and Prince Edward Island Railway			Acquired by CGR.
New Brunswick Railway			Acquired by CPR.
New Westminster Southern Railway Company			Subsidiary of GN.
Newfoundland Railway	Newfoundland	1892–1949	Entrusted to CNR.
Newfoundland and Northwestern Railway	Newfoundland		Acquired by NR.
Niagara Falls Park and River Railway			
Niagara, St. Catharines and Toronto Railway			Acquired by CNR, merged into CNEL.
Nicola, Kamloops and Similkameen Coal and Railway Company	Spences Bridge BC to Nicola BC	1907–1989	Acquired by CPR.
North Shore Railway			Acquired by CPR.
Northern Alberta Railways	northern Alberta	1929–1981	Acquired by CNR.
Northern Pacific and Manitoba Railway			Subsidiary of NP.
Northern Railway of Canada			Acquired by GTR.
Nosbonsing & Nipissing Railway			Abandoned.
Nova Scotia Central Railway			Acquired by CNoR.
Nova Scotia Southern Railway			Acquired by H&SW
Nova Scotia Railway	central Nova Scotia	1853–1867	Merged into IRC.
Nova Scotia Tramways and Power	Halifax, Nova Scotia	1917-1928	Became Nova Scotia Light and Power Company, Limited, 1928
Nova Scotia Light and Power	Halifax, Nova Scotia	1928-1949	Rail operations ceased 1949; converted to electric trolley coaches

== O ==
Railway name	Locale	Operating years	Comments
Orangeville Brampton Railway	Orangeville To Brampton, Ontario	2000-2021	
Okanagan Valley Railway	Okanagan Valley, British Columbia	1998 - 2009	Shut down due to lack of business.
Ontario and Quebec Railway			Acquired by CPR.
Ontario and Rainy River Railway	Rainy River, Ontario	1886 – 1900	Acquired by CNoR.
Ontario L'Orignal Railway	eastern Ontario	1996–2001	Acquired by OCR.
Orford Mountain Railway			Acquired by CPR.
Oshawa Railway			Acquired by CNR.
Ottawa and New York Railway	Eastern Ontario	1898–1957	Subsidiary of NYC.
Ottawa, Arnprior and Parry Sound Railway			Acquired by CAR.
Ottawa Northern and Western Railway			Acquired by CPR.

== P ==
Railway name	Locale	Operating years	Comments
Pacific Great Eastern Railway	British Columbia	1913–1972	Renamed BCR.
Parry Sound Colonization Railway	Ontario	1887–1892	Acquired by OA&PS.
Pontiac Pacific Junction Railway	Quebec	1880–1903	Merged with Ottawa Northern and Western Railway.
Port Arthur, Duluth and Western Railway	Ontario	1889–1938	Abandoned
Preston and Berlin Railway	Waterloo Region, Ontario	1857	Short-lived line connecting the city of Berlin (Kitchener) to the town of Preston. Line was later sold to GTR and became part of the Galt Subdivision.
Prince Edward Island Railway	Prince Edward Island	1871–1918	Operated by CGR, entrusted to CNR.

== Q ==
Railway name	Locale	Operating years	Comments
Qu'Appelle, Long Lake and Saskatchewan Railroad and Steamboat Company	Regina to Prince Albert	1885–1906	Acquired by CNoR.
Quebec and Lake St. John Railway	Quebec to Roberval	1880–1906	Acquired by CNoR.
Quebec and Saguenay Railway			Acquired by CNR.
Quebec Central Railway	Eastern Townships and Beauce		Acquired by CPR 1911. Dormant 1994–2000, and again from 2006.
Quebec, Montreal and Southern Railway			Subsidiary of DH, acquired by CN.
Quebec, Montreal, Ottawa and Occidental Railway			Acquired by CPR.
Quebec Oriental Railway			Acquired by CNR.
Quebec Railway Light and Power Company (Quebec, Montmorency & Charlevoix Railway)	Quebec-La Malbaie		Acquired by CNR.
Quebec Southern Railway			

== R ==
Railway name	Locale	Operating years	Comments
Red Mountain Railway	Rossland to Paterson BC	1897–1921	Subsidiary of Great Northern Railway. Also named Columbia and Red Mountain Railway in Washington State.
Rutland and Noyan Railway			Subsidiary of RUT. Abandoned.

== S ==
Railway name	Locale	Operating years	Comments
Shaw Logging Railroad	Prairie River, SK area	1907-1917	
St. Eustache Railway			Acquired by CPR.
St. John and Quebec Railway			Acquired by CNR.
St. Lawrence and Atlantic Railroad	southwestern Quebec	1853-1853	Acquired by GTR.
St. Lawrence and Hudson Railway	Ontario, Quebec, New England	1996–2001	Subsidiary of CPR created to operate lines in eastern North America. Merged back into parent company.
St. Lawrence and Ottawa Railway			Acquired by CPR.
St. Mary's and Western Railway			Acquired by CPR.
St. Maurice Valley Railway			Acquired by CPR.
Schomberg and Aurora Railway			
Shawinigan Falls Terminal Railway			
Smoky Falls Railway			Subsidiary of SFPPC.
South Ontario Pacific Railway			Acquired by CPR.
South Western Traction Company	Ontario	1902–1908	Became London and Lake Erie Railway and Transportation Company.
Sudbury and Copper Cliff Suburban Electric Railway	Greater Sudbury, Ontario	1915–50	Converted to bus operations.
Sydney and Louisburg Railway	Cape Breton Island	1895–1966	Acquired by DEVCO, line to Louisbourg is now defunct.

== T ==
Railway name	Locale	Operating years	Comments
Temiscouata Railway	eastern Quebec, northwestern New Brunswick	1870–1949	Acquired by CNR.
Terra Transport	Newfoundland	1977–1988	Division of CN. Abandoned.
Thousand Islands Railway	Eastern Ontario	1884–1958	Acquired by GTR.
Thurso and Nation Valley Railway	Thurso to Duhamel, Quebec	1927–1986	Subsidiary of SC.
Temiskaming and Northern Ontario Railway	Northeastern Ontario	1902–1946	Renamed to ONR.
Tillsonburg Lake Erie and Pacific Railway	Southwestern Ontario	1896-1958	Acquired by CPR in 1904 and entity ceased to exist by 1958.
Toronto, Grey and Bruce Railway	South-west Ontario	1871–1883	Acquired by O&Q.
Toronto and Nipissing Railway	south-central Ontario	1871–1883	Amalgamated into Midland Railway of Canada.
Toronto, Hamilton and Buffalo Railway	southwestern Ontario	1892–1987	Acquired by CPR.
Toronto Suburban Railway	Southwestern Ontario, Southern-Ontario	1891–1931	Acquired by CNoR.

== V ==
Railway name	Locale	Operating years	Comments
Vancouver and Lulu Island Railway			Acquired by Canadian Pacific subsequently leased to British Columbia Electric Railway.
Vancouver, Victoria and Eastern Railway			
Vancouver, Westminster and Yukon Railway			ran from New Westminster to Vancouver along the Brunette and Still Creeks on modern CN alignment. Owned by lumberman John Hendry, it wanted to bridge the Second Narrows and go north.
Victoria and Sidney Railway			Subsidiary of Great Northern Railway. Known as "the Cordwood Limited"
Victoria Terminal Railway and Ferry Company			later acquired by the Great Northern Railway

== W ==
Railway name	Locale	Operating years	Comments
Wabash Railroad			Operated over running rights on CAL, later CN. WAB merged into NW, later NS.
Walkerton and Lucknow Railway			Acquired by CPR.
West Ontario Pacific Railway			Acquired by CPR.
Western Counties Railway			Merged with W&A into DAR.
Windsor and Annapolis Railway	Nova Scotia	opened August 18, 1869	Merged with WCR into DAR.
Windsor and Hantsport Railway	Nova Scotia	1994 to 2011	
Windsor, Essex and Lake Shore Rapid Railway			
Winnipeg Transfer Railway	Manitoba	formed 1889, charter issued March 31, 1890	Operated in Winnipeg's Exchange District. In 1987 City of Winnipeg acquired spur lines in Exchange District to convert to roads.

== Y ==
Railway name	Locale	Operating years	Comments
Yarmouth and Annapolis Railway			Renamed WCR.

== See also ==
- List of Canadian railways
- History of rail transport in Canada
