= OVR =

OVR may refer to:

- .OVR (file extension), a file extension used with overlay managers
- Ottawa Valley Railway
- Fatherland – All Russia: former political party in Russia, the acronym for the party is often translated from Russian as OVR
