= International Railroad =

The following railroads have been called International Railroad or International Railway:

- International Railway of Maine
- International Railway (New York – Ontario)
- International Railway (Quebec)
- International Railroad (Texas)
- International Railway (New Brunswick)
