= Mattawa station =

Railway station in Ontario, Canada

Mattawa
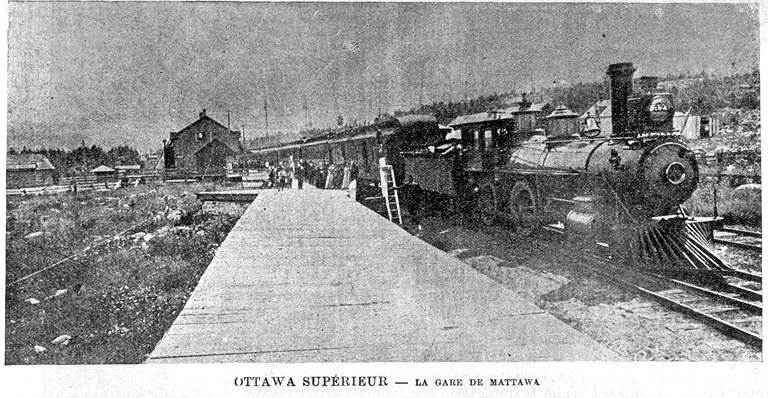
- Train at Mattawa station in 1892

General information
- Location: Park Street, Mattawa, Ontario, Canada
- Coordinates: 46.311607°N 78.703289°W

History
- Opening: 1881
- Closed: 1990
- Rebuilt: 1890s

Former services
Preceding station	Via Rail	Following station
North Bay toward Vancouver	The Canadian before 1990	Chalk River toward Montreal
Preceding station	Canadian Pacific Railway	Following station
Eau Claire toward Vancouver	Main Line	Klock toward Montreal Windsor
Town Hall toward Angliers	Angliers – Mattawa	Terminus
Location

Mattawa station is a disused Canadian Pacific Railway train station in Mattawa, Ontario, Canada.

The railroad was built to Mattawa in 1881 A railway line from Mattawa to Témiscaming, Quebec opened in 1923,

Mattawa was located on the Canadian Pacific Railway's Chalk River subdivision, connecting Smiths Falls and North Bay. The route was later leased to Ottawa Valley Railway, and part of it was abandoned and torn up.
