= Carillon and Grenville Railway =

Abandoned railway in Quebec, Canada

Overview
- Headquarters: Montreal
- Locale: Quebec, Canada
- Dates of operation: 1854–1910

Technical
- Track gauge: 5 ft 6 in (1,676 mm)
- Length: 12 mi (19 km)

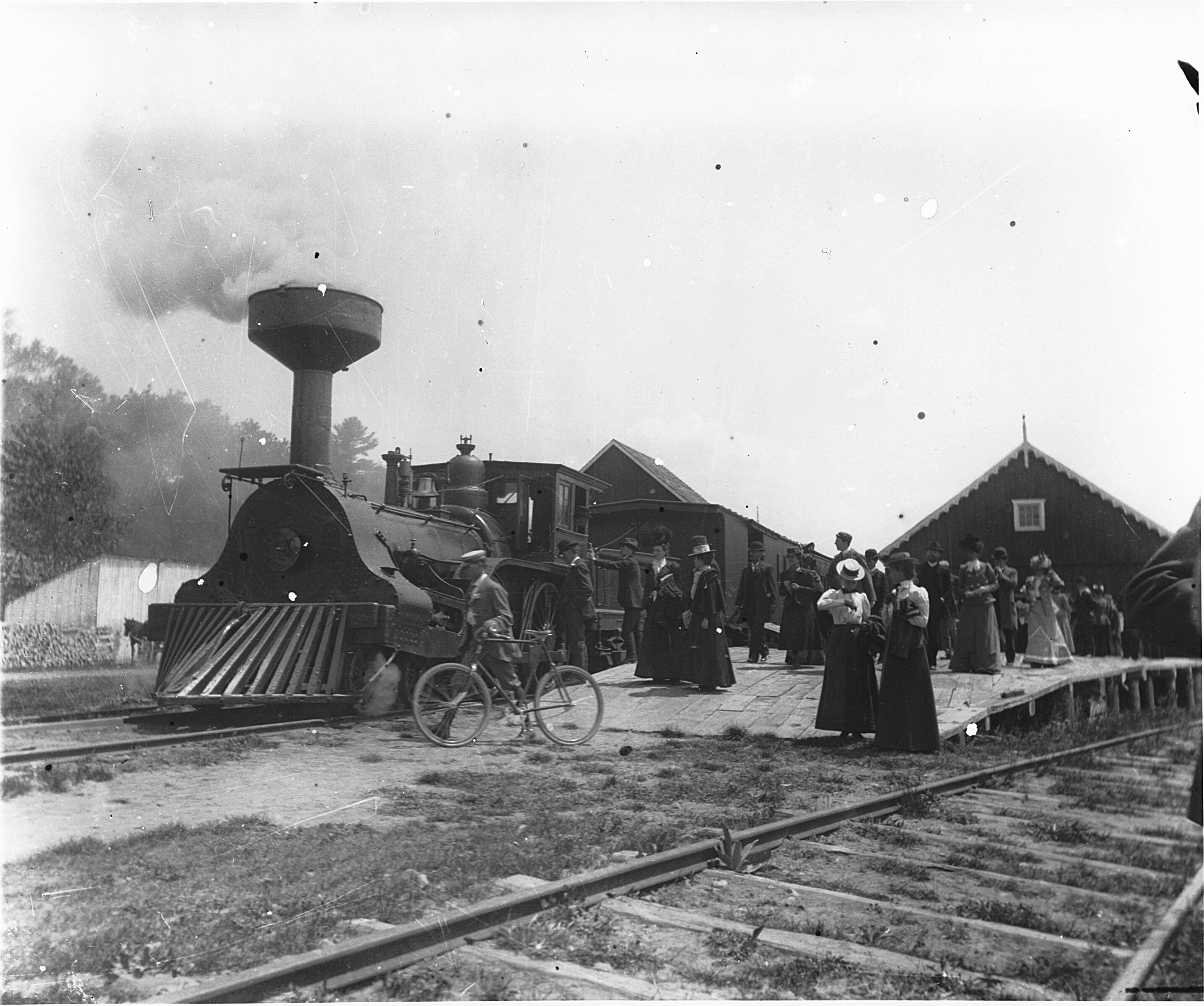
Train and passengers at Carillon station, 1899

The Carillon and Grenville Railway (CAGR) was a 5 ft 6 in (1,676 mm) broad gauge portage railway in Quebec, running approximately 12 miles (19 km) between the towns of Carillon and Grenville on the north bank of the Ottawa River. It provided a through-route from Ottawa to Montreal via steamships on either side of the Long Sault Rapids. It was one of Canada's earliest railways, opened in 1854, and was the last operational broad gauge railway in Canada when it closed in 1910.

Although it was the shortest railway in North America, (Note: In terms of being a separate operating company, as opposed to a branch owned by some other entity.) used for only one round trip a day, and quickly rendered redundant by other railways in the area, the CAGR nevertheless has a storied history. Numerous developers coveted its location on the Ottawa River as an approach to Montreal, and it changed hands repeatedly in the early 20th century. The original rails were lifted in 1914, but portions of the route were re-used by Canadian Northern Railway (CNoR), then in turn by Canadian National Railways (CNR), as the Grenville subdivision, before finally being abandoned in 1988.

== History ==
=== Early efforts ===
The three sets of rapids on the Ottawa River at Carillon, Chute à Blondeau and Grenville had long been a target for canalization. The first such attempt began in 1818 as the Grenville Canal, with a 9.5 kilometres (5.9 mi) section opened in 1833, but the entire length and a set of 11 locks was not fully completed until 1843. The locks had been designed for military use, and were sized at 134 by 33 by 5 feet (40.8 by 10.1 by 1.5 m), which was too small and shallow for commercial use. As the importance of the forestry industry grew in the later half of the 19th century, there was increasing pressure to improve the canals for larger barges, and with the introduction of steamships, for passenger traffic as well.

For the passenger traffic, stage coach service along both shores of the river was available, but this was slow and uncomfortable. On 26 July 1840 the "Upper and Lower Ottawa Rail-road" company formed to build a railway route along the coach line on the north side of the river. The company was unable to raise funds, and the charter lapsed. A second attempt was made by the Carillon and Grenville Railway Company, formed on 24 June 1847, led by Joseph Abbott, with his sons John and Harry both purchasing stock. This effort also lapsed.

=== Montreal and Bytown ===
A much more ambitious plan was hatched in August 1853, involving a large group led by W. A . Masson. This project, known collectively in the newspapers of the era as the "Montreal and Ottawa Valley Trunk Line", was actually a collection of three lines that all ended in Ottawa, at that time still known by its original name, Bytown. The first was the Montreal and Bytown Railway along the north shore of the river, the second was the Brockville and Ottawa Railway which ran to the Ottawa River at Pembroke, and the last was the Bytown and Pembroke Railway running north out of the city to Pembroke. The resulting network would form a large three-pointed star centred on Bytown, offering service over a large area while bypassing rapids on both the Ottawa and St. Lawrence rivers.

The Montreal and Bytown route was originally estimated to be 110 miles (180 km) long along the mainline from Montreal to Hull, where it would enter Bytown via a bridge over the Ottawa. Another 23 miles (37 km) of feeders were also planned. A survey put the actual length of the mainline at 119.5 miles (192.3 km), and the total cost at £831,750 ($4,042,305). The contract for both the Montreal and Bytown and the Brockville and Ottawa was won by James Sykes of Sheffield, England at the end of 1853. Funding was provided by 20-year bonds that matured in 1874 and had a 6% coupon. Skykes was paid with $100,000 in cash and the rest bonds, which he intended to sell in England.

Moving to Canada along with his two brothers and foreman Charles deBergue to oversee construction, the team began work on the Carillon to Grenville section. The 12.5 miles (20.1 km) route was completed on 25 October 1854 and opened for traffic when the locomotive arrived in early December. It ran a single 4-4-0 engine, the Ottawa. Over the winter, Sykes had sold £50,000 of bonds in England, enough for extensions on either side of the existing route. On his return to North America, his ship sank in a storm off Portland, Maine. His brother William took control of the railway on 1 August 1855 and attempted to operate it for his own profit. The company sued, and on 21 September 1855 a writ was signed to seize the equipment. The Sykes brothers moved to Toronto. The company, unable to afford to operate the line, left it dormant for a year.

=== New Carillon & Grenville ===
In 1856 the line was handed to the wardens of Ottawa and Argenteuil counties, who organized a bank loan of $6,000 to pay farmers that had not received their payments for the right-of-way. They then operated the line to pay off the loan. This was successful, and a second locomotive was added in August 1858, the Grenville. By this time, bond holders in England had organized and sued the company, forcing them into bankruptcy. The entire line was put up for auction in January 1859, and John Abbot purchased it for $21,200. On 4 May 1859 he formed the second Carillon and Grenville Railway Company, with the new charter stating that the Montreal and Bytown could purchase the line if construction ever restarted.

On 19 May 1860 the company rechartered, taking over the moribund Montreal and Bytown's land rights, with options to build westward to Ottawa if the Vaudreuil Railway had not done so within two years, and eastward to Montreal to join the Grand Trunk Railway at Pointe-Claire in Montreal, or alternately the North Shore Railway at Rivière des Prairies. A further extension in 1861 allowed a connection to the Montreal and Champlain Railroad at Lachine. In the end, none of these expansion plans would be built, leaving the CAGR isolated. It was given an enormous boost on 31 December 1857 when Queen Victoria announced Ottawa would become the new Canadian capital. Riverboat traffic increased almost immediately and the railway was able to operate one round trip per day as long as the river was passable.

In 1864 the newly organized Ottawa River Navigation Company purchased the line from Abbott, who made a "handsome profit". They operated it as part of an end-to-end network with both steamers and the railway. They added a third 4-4-0 locomotive, the Carillon, in 1874. In practice, the entire line was run by John Halsey, who was General Manager, Superintendent, Road Master, Master Mechanic and Engine Driver.

=== Central Railway of Canada ===
In 1890, Charles Newhouse Armstrong floated the idea of building a mainline from Gaspé, Quebec to Sault Ste. Marie, Ontario by buying up small lines and building links between them. The ideas underwent many modifications, name changes, and rechartering before finally dying in the 1910s. During that time only two railways were actually built, the Great Northern Railway of Canada that ran from Grenville into the area north of Montreal, and Central Railway of Canada that was effectively its counterpart in Ontario, with the two meeting in Hawkesbury, Ontario, directly across the Ottawa River from Grenville.

As part of these plans, Armstrong purchased the Ottawa River Navigation Company in 1905, planning to use it as part of a southern route into Montreal. He continued running the line as before until 1910, when the steamer service ended in favour of the now multiple routes into Ottawa. The line was lifted in 1911 but the locomotives were not removed until 1914. By 1912, Armstrong' empire included the Ottawa River Railway, the Central Counties Railway, the Great Eastern Railway and the Ste. Agathe Branch of the Ottawa Navigation Company. These purchases were later declared illegal, and in December 1917 the company was declared bankrupt.

=== Canadian Northern ===
The Canadian Northern Railway (CNoR) had been considering the problem of their own route into Montreal for some time. In 1907 they purchased the Great Northern from Armstrong, in order to use his crossing at Hawksbury and the ultimate goal of adding the Carillon & Grenville as their initial approach to Montreal. They completed a new line from Ottawa to Hawksbury to 1909, but struggled to purchase the Carillon & Grenville from Armstrong, who still had plans to build up his competing network. These plans began to unravel, and CNoR finally took control of the CAGR in 1914, using only a small portion of the route before turning off its route to run northeast into the city.

CNoR struggled during World War I, a combination of lack of labour, high prices for what labour was available, and grandiose expansion plans that did not make financial sense. By 1918 the company was insolvent, and ultimately became part of Canadian National Railways (CN). CN continued using the CNoR section of the original line until 1939, when they merged operations on several lines in the area.

== Route ==
From maps in Sandilands, unless otherwise noted.

The railway originally ran west-northwest from Carillon to the Grenville Point, a short distance northwest of Grenville. From Carillon it passed through Monalea, Cushing, Watson, Stonefield and finally Grenville.

When the line was taken over by CNoR, a new Grenville station was built a short distance southeast of the town at the northern end of bridge to Hawkesbury. They laid new line for a short distance between the bridge and a location just to the east, where it joined the original CAGR. The line followed the CAGR alignment to a point just west of Cushing. From here they ran new line between the original alignment and the river, building new Cushing and Monalea stations slightly south of their original locations. The new line turned eastward and crossed the original about halfway between Monalea and Carillon, and from that point ran north of the original alignment. The original section from Cushing Junction to Carillon was abandoned, but the section between the new Grenville Station and Grenville Point remained in use as a spur.

The Great Northern originally ran just south of the CAGR to a point just east of the bridge, where it turned east, crossed the CAGR, and then ran to a point just north of Watson where it turned northeast. In 1919, CNoR built a 1.1 miles (1.8 km) line from a point some distance west of Watson, confusingly named Cushing Junction, (Note: Cushing is further from the Junction than Watson.) northeast to meet the rest of the Great Northern. The 4.98 miles (8.01 km) section of the Great Northern from the bridge to this new junction was then abandoned. This entire section of the Great Northern, as far as Lachute, was abandoned in 1940.

The remaining portion of the original CAGR route remained in use as a through route from Ottawa to Montreal until 26 July 1939, when the original Canada Atlantic Railway (CAR) line between Ottawa and Jessup was abandoned, and the lines were lifted in October. In 1940 the remainder of this route from Jessup to Hawkesbury was also abandoned. The original section was now organized as part of the Grenville Subdivision. The bridge to Hawkesbury had to be abandoned in 1962 when the river level was raised as part of Hydro-Québec's Carillon Generating Station. The remaining spur into Grenville was abandoned in 1963, but regular passenger service remained to Grenville Station until its last run on 9 January 1976. The entire Grenville Subdivision was abandoned on 14 September 1988.

== See also ==
- List of Ontario railways
- List of defunct Canadian railways
