= I&R =

I&R may refer to:

- Initiative & Referendum Institute (I&R Institute)
- Intelligence, surveillance, target acquisition, and reconnaissance (I&R Platoon)
- Inverness and Richmond Railway (I&R Railway)
- Imperial and Royal (I&R)

== See also ==
- INR (disambiguation)
- R&I (disambiguation)
