= Hilda Villegas Castrejón =

Mexican physician, researcher and academic

- Born: 26 February 1931; Mexico City
- Died: 1 August 2012 (aged 81)
- Education: National Autonomous University of Mexico; Free University of Berlin
- Occupation: Surgeon
- Known for: Pioneer in electron microscopy

Hilda Villegas Castrejón (26 February 1931 – 1 August 2012) was a Mexican surgeon and a pioneer in electron microscopy. She was a member of the Mexican Academy of Surgery.

== Biography ==
Hilda's father, Andrés Villegas Reyes, was a medical surgeon graduated from "Escuela Medico Militar (S.D.N.)" and radiologist. She graduated in 1955 as a medical surgeon from the Faculty of Medicine of the National Autonomous University of Mexico (UNAM). She earned a pathology fellowship at Presbyterian / St. Luke's Medical Center and Columbus Hospital in Chicago. She earned a doctorate in medical sciences from the Free University of Berlin.

In 1970, she specialized in electron microscopy at the Free University of Berlin, and became a pioneer in the use of this technology in Mexico at medical institutions such as the Centro Médico Nacional Siglo XXI, the National Institute of Perinatology, and the National Institute of Rehabilitation (INR). Villegas was in charge of founding the electron microscopy sections, and at the INR she held the position of research director.

In 1990, she became the first woman to enter the Mexican Academy of Surgery as an expert in morphology. Villegas was a tenured professor at the UNAM School of Medicine.

== Selected works ==
Villegas participated in some 70 publications in peer-reviewed journals.

- Villegas Castrejón, H., Carrillo Farga, J., Paredes, Y., Barrón, A., & Karchmer K, S. (1994). Ultrastructural study of placentas in HIV-positive women. Ginecol. obstet. Méx, 136–42.
- Villegas Castrejón, H., González Jiménez, MA, Fuentes García, S., Casanova Román, G., Beltrán Zúñiga, M., & Flores Rivera, E. (1995). Gardnerella vaginalis infection in heterosexual couples: ultrastructural study in desquamation cells of the stratified epithelium. Ginecol. obstet. Méx, 139–46.
- Villegas Castrejón, H., Paredes Vivas, Y., Flores Rivera, E., Gorbea Robles, MDC, & Arredondo García, JL (1996). Comparative study of the placenta of HIV-positive mothers. Ultrastructural analysis. Ginecol. obstet. Méx, 167–76.
- Villegas-Castrejón, H., Hernández-Pérez, AD, Peralta, S., Vázquez-Escamilla, J., & Reyes-Marín, B. (2006). Diagnosis of Krabbe leukodystrophy by transmission electron microscopy. Report of a patient. Surgery and Surgeons, 74 (6), 477–481.
- García-Pérez, BE, De la Cruz-López, JJ, Castañeda-Sánchez, JI, Muñoz-Duarte, AR, Hernández-Pérez, AD, Villegas-Castrejón, H., ... & Luna-Herrera, J. ( 2012). Macropinocytosis is responsible for the uptake of pathogenic and non-pathogenic mycobacteria by B lymphocytes (Raji cells). BMC microbiology, 12 (1), 1–14.
