= INR =

INR or Inr may refer to:

== Biology ==
- Initiator element, a core promoter in genetics
- International normalized ratio of prothrombin time of blood coagulation
- Interventional neuroradiology, a minimally invasive medical specialty

== Organizations ==
- Bureau of Intelligence and Research of the U.S. State Department
- Institute of National Remembrance, a Polish research institute
- Institute for Nuclear Research of the Russian Academy of Sciences
- Instituto Nacional de Rehabilitación, a public health institute in Mexico
- Institut national belge de radiodiffusion, French name of Belgium's National Institute of Radio Broadcasting (1930–1960)

== Currency ==
- Indian rupee, by ISO 4217 currency code

== Other uses ==
- Independent National Radio, the official term for national commercial radio stations in the United Kingdom
- McKinley National Park Airport, Alaska, USA, FAA identifier
- International Railway (New Brunswick) A former rail line in the province of New Brunswick, in Canada
- Israel Numismatic Research, an Israeli journal of ancient and medieval coins
