= London and Lake Erie Railway and Transportation Company =

The London and Lake Erie Railway and Transportation Company is a defunct Interurban railway that operated in Ontario, Canada from 1902 to 1918. Originally chartered as the South Western Traction Company, the line was renamed the London and Lake Erie Railway in 1909. Throughout its short life, the line was always referred to locally as "The Traction Line".

== The South Western Traction Company ==
In 1902, a group of London, Ontario residents led by Thomas Purdom and Alfred E. Welch chartered an electric railway based in London. Unlike the municipally owned London and Port Stanley Railway, the South Western Traction Company was chartered primarily as a passenger hauling line. Lines were planned to several other municipalities in the area, but ultimately, the line was a 28-mile meandering route between London and Port Stanley. The line began construction in 1903 southward from London to Lambeth. Construction stopped in 1904 when the company ran out of funds but resumed after additional capital was secured from the Canadian Electric Traction Company, a joint venture between Canadian and British investors. The generating equipment and rolling stock were supplied by Bruce Peebles & Co. Ltd. of Edinburgh, Scotland. The equipment on the South Western Traction Company used a Three phase AC electric overhead traction system designed by Ganz of Budapest, Hungary. The new traction line and was the only railroad in North America to use this system.

The powerhouse was built in Chelsea Green, a suburb of London, near its chief competitor the London & Port Stanley Railway (L&PS).

The route of the line continued southward towards St. Thomas, passing through the villages of Scottsville, Tempo and Lynhurst. Tracks reached St. Thomas in July 1906. The Traction Line used the tracks of the St. Thomas Municipal Railway to navigate through the city streets. The line entered town on the west end and exited southward on the east end, crossing over the London and Port Stanley Railway via the street railway on Talbot Street in the process. Continuing southward, the line passed through the village of Union and entered Port Stanley via Colborne Street. The Traction Line station was on the east side of Port Stanley harbour, compared to the more extensive L&PS yards on the west side. The station was located directly off Colborne Street and still exists today. There was a spur line that ran behind the station down to the dock for loading fish and passengers. The line entered London via Baseline Road, and curved north towards downtown. A long trestle carried the line over the Thames River valley before terminating at the company's station on Horton Street.

There had been various issues with the Ganz A/C overhead system, and this prompted the line to switch to D/C operation in early 1907. The company ordered six D/C motor cars from the Ottawa Car Company in Ottawa, Ontario in March 1907. The line was dealt a major blow on August 10, 1907, when a fire caused by crossed wires destroyed the company's car barns in London. The company's six British built cars were in the barns at the time, and five were destroyed. Four of the new Ottawa cars were in St. Thomas, but hadn't had their motors or equipment installed. The losses for the railway were pegged at over $160,000. The following year, six additional cars were purchased from Preston Car and Coach in Preston, Ontario. The first train arrived in Port Stanley in October 1907. Plans for expansions to Delaware and Aylmer, Ontario were looked at in 1907 as well., but for several reasons, these extensions were never built. The year 1908 brought about receivership and with it, a change in ownership.

In 2012, the South Western Traction Line was inducted to the North America Railway Hall of Fame. The South Western Traction Line was recognized for its contribution to railroading as the only three-phase AC electric railroad in North America, and one of only a few in the world. The line was inducted in the "Community, Business, Government or Organization" class in the "Local" category (pertaining specifically to the area in and around St. Thomas, Ontario.)

== The London and Lake Erie Railway and Transportation Company ==
In 1908, the South Western Traction Company was in receivership and was purchased at auction by J. MacDougall of London. A consortium of businessmen led by G.B Woods of Toronto purchased the line from Mr. MacDougall and formed the London and Lake Erie Railway and Navigation Company. The first manager of the company was Mr. S.W. Mower. The company prospered, with both freight and passenger revenues up. In 1911, the company was dealt another blow when Sunday service was suspended by the Province under the Lord's Day Act. The London and Lake Erie, operating as a provincial charter, was not exempt from the act. Sunday cars were viewed as strictly recreational, and as the line did not provide an essential link, was forced to discontinue Sunday service. This was not reinstated until 1913. S.W. Mower resigned as manager in 1912, and was replaced by William Nelson Warburton.

Warburton had worked with several other interurban railways in Ontario including the Niagara, St. Catharines and Toronto Railway and the Chatham, Wallaceburg and Lake Erie Railway. Streamlining of the stops between London and Port Stanley was done shortly after Warburton assumed his position. Business was so good, the company also ordered two motor cars and two trailer cars from the Niles Car Company. The company also experimented with generating more freight service during this period. Fish from the dock in Port Stanley was the main commodity hauled, but never panned out into the big revenue generator the company hoped for. The tight curves and steep grades of the London and Lake Erie Railway, while satisfactory for interurban cars, was not conducive to effective freight operations. An interchange was established in St. Thomas around 1913 with the Michigan Central Railroad. In 1915, the Niles cars were sold to the Niagara, St. Catharines and Toronto Railway. Talks were held in Aylmer in 1915 as well, the company seriously looking at extending the line. The plan was to extend to Port Burwell via Aylmer, but that never came to pass. The London and Lake Erie's lack of a rail connection in London was a major factor in this decision.

In July, 1915, the London and Port Stanley Railway was electrified. That, combined with the ever-growing threat of the automobile, eventually spelled the end for the London and Lake Erie Railway.

== Decline and Sale ==
Throughout the next few years, the London and Lake Erie struggled for survival. The outbreak of World War I did little to improve the line's fortunes. Traffic was up, but revenues were not. The beach area in Port Stanley was very developed as well, but the London and Lake Erie, being on the opposite side of the harbour, lost out on the majority of the tourist traffic. The London and Lake Erie retired its London generating station in 1915 in favour of purchasing power from Ontario Hydro. Management was increasingly cutting power to cut costs, often stranding cars out on the line, much to the chagrin of passengers. A record 726,799 passengers were carried in the 1916-1917 fiscal year, but it was too little, too late. The equipment was under increasing pressure, but revenue wasn't available to perform the necessary repairs. The winter of 1917 was exceptionally harsh. Wartime demands had reduced the amount of coal available, and service had to be drastically cut back due to no heat being available for the cars. Beginning in 1916, management began looking at options to sell the railway.

Both London and St. Thomas expressed interest in purchasing portions of the line, but neither were willing to pay the full $600,000 asking price. Sir Adam Beck, Ontario Hydro visionary and former mayor of London, suggested that the City counter with just over $300,000, but this was declined by management. London was only interested in the portion southward to Talbotville and intended to operate it as commuter railway extension of the London Street Railway. The actual physical appraisal of the line in 1918 was $360,000. A buyer could not be found however, and the decision was made to scrap the line.

On October 28, 1918, a statement was issued by manager Warburton that the London and Lake Erie Railway had ceased operations. Service was first cut back from Port Stanley to St. Thomas, with the remaining service discontinued shortly thereafter. Over the next few years, the assets of the company were liquidated. Most of the company's rolling stock went to the Niagara, St. Catharines and Toronto Railway, with four cars going to the Oshawa Railway.

The right of way inside the London city limits was sold to the municipality. Belgrave Avenue south of Tecumseh Street follows the old traction line grade. The bridge over the Thames River remained until it was moved to the west to carry Richmond Street over the river. The London station building was sold to the Salvation Army and was demolished in the early 1950s when it was replaced. The remaining station buildings were dismantled over the years, save for Port Stanley. The grade can also be seen in various places, mainly south of St. Thomas.

== See also ==
- List of Ontario railways
- List of defunct Canadian railways
