= Chemin de fer Lanaudière =

Canadian railway company

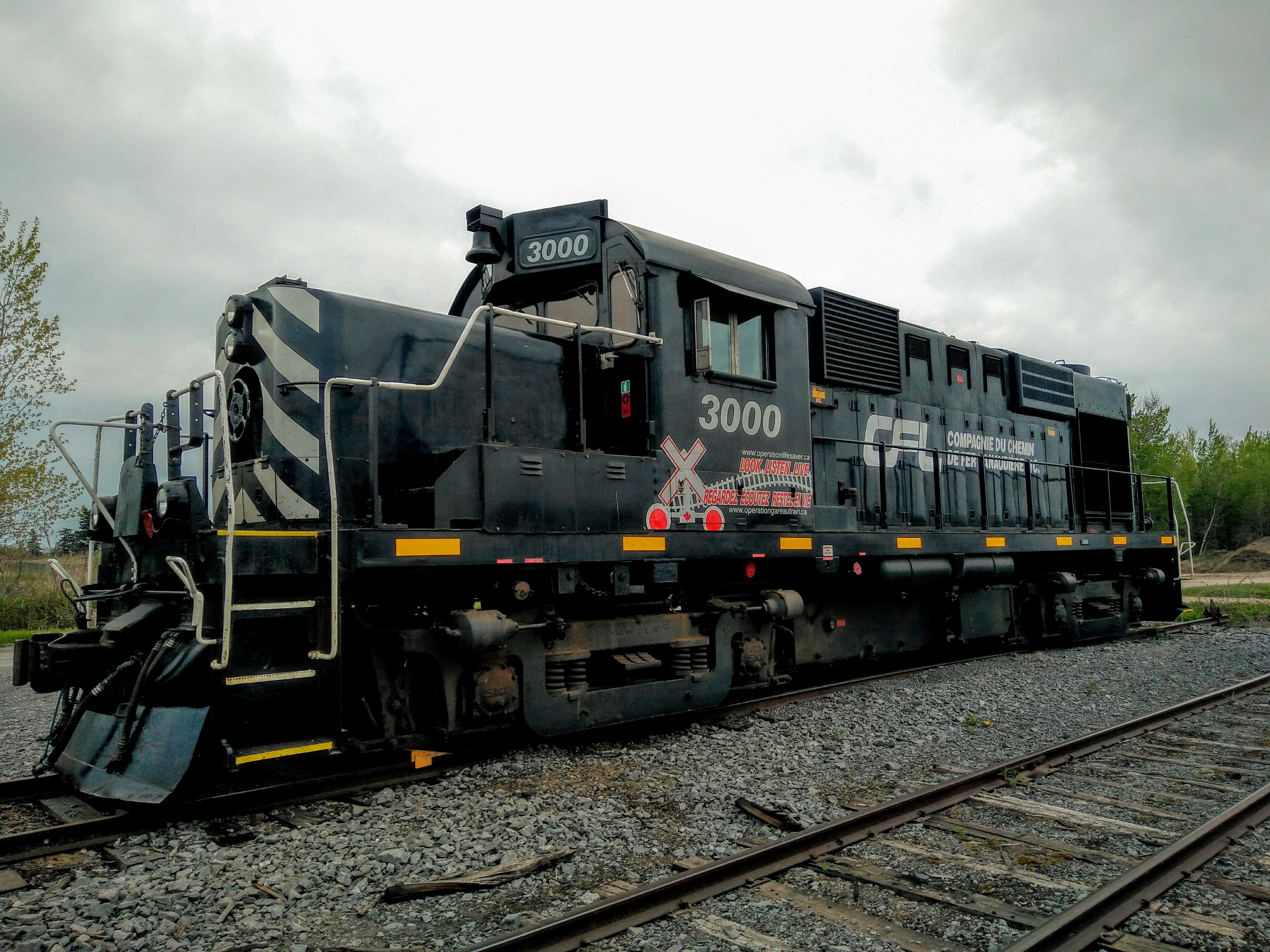
- Locomotive number 3000

Overview
- Headquarters: Saint-Félix-de-Valois, Quebec
- Reporting mark: CFL
- Dates of operation: 1992–

Other
- Website: www.cflanaudiere.com/en/reseau.php

Compagnie du chemin de fer Lanaudière Inc. (French pronunciation: [ʃəmɛ̃ də fɛʁ lanodjɛʁ], CFL), provides regional rail infrastructure supporting local economic activity, including transportation, storage and several unloading sites that accommodate various types of products. The railroad has been in operation since 1992.

Chemin de fer Lanaudière is connected to the Canadian Pacific (CP) and Canadian National (CN) network by the Quebec Gatineau Railway (QGRY). The railroad crosses the Lanaudière region over a distance of 17 kilometres (10.6 mi) between Joliette and Saint-Félix-de-Valois. The network includes transhipping sites and offers the possibility of other junctions.
