= International Railway (New Brunswick) =

Former railway in New Brunswick, Canada

Saint-Quentin Subdivision
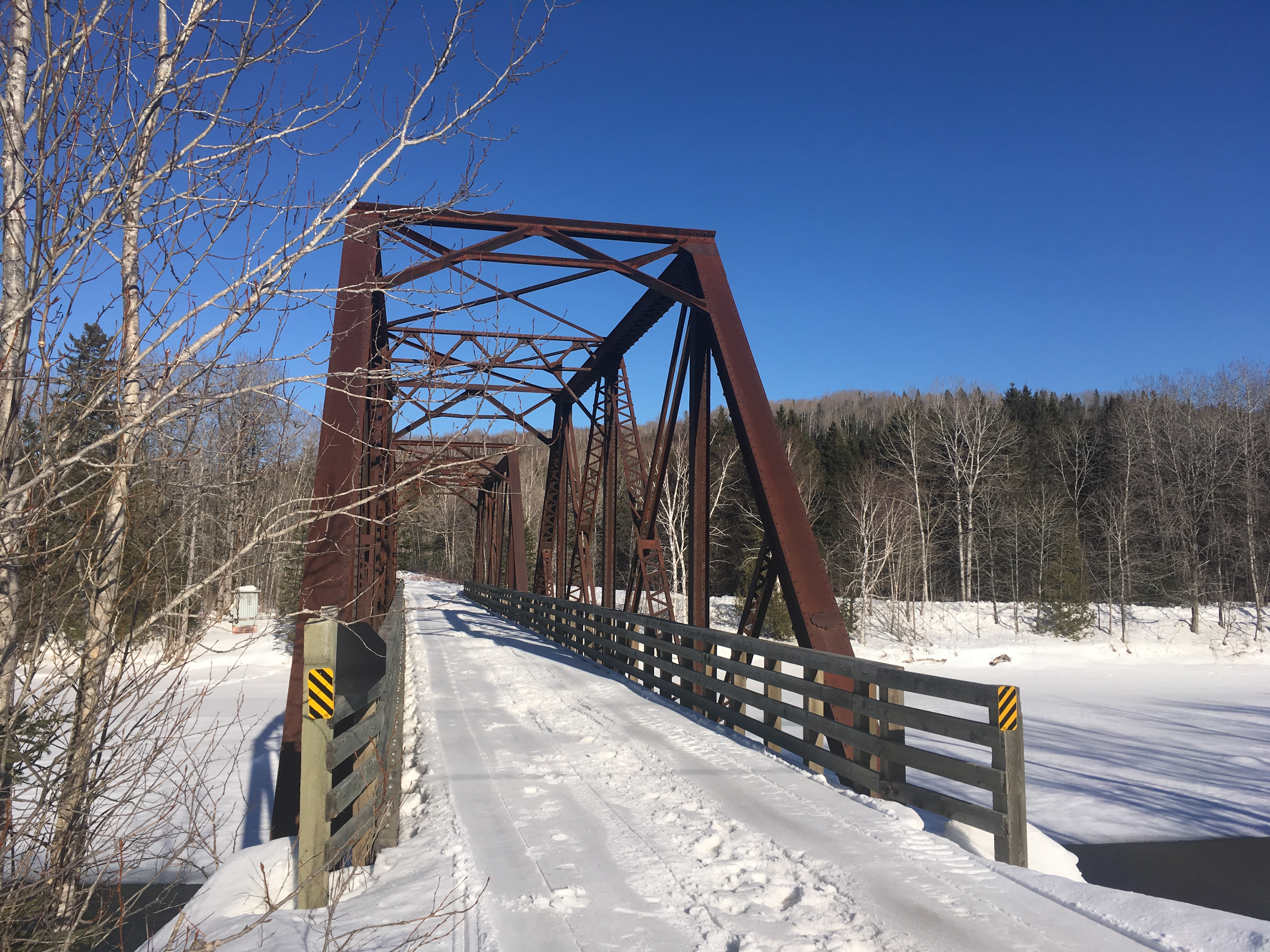
- The former rail bridge in Upsalquitch, the longest one on the route. It is now used as a trail bridge

Overview
- Other names: INR, International Railway
- Status: Abandoned. Now used as trail.
- Owner: CN
- Locale: Northern New Brunswick
- Connecting lines: Mont-Joli Subdivision at Tide Head and the Napadogan Subdivision at Saint-Léonard (Both CN lines.)

History
- Opened: 1900
- Completed: 1911
- Closed: 1989

Technical
- Line length: 105.76 mi (170.20 km)
- Track gauge: 4 ft 8½ in (1435 mm) Standard Gauge

The International Railway, officially the Saint-Quentin Subdivision, often also shortened to the INR, was a former railway in the northern part of the province of New Brunswick, Canada. It stretched from Tide Head, New Brunswick, (near Campbellton) in the northeast, to Saint-Leonard, New Brunswick, in the southwest. It was built in the early 1900s and was existent until 1989, when CN was granted permission to abandon the line. The rail line is now a trail, of which about 60% forms part of the International Appalachian Trail.

== History ==
On the 6th of April, 1885, the Restigouche and Victoria Colonization Railway Company was incorporated to build and maintain a rail line between Campbellton, or a point near it, and somewhere between Grand Falls and Edmundston, on the Saint John River. Between 1900 and 1911, different parts of the line were completed and opened to traffic. Around this time, on June 22, 1906, it became vested in the International Railway Company of New Brunswick. During 1916, the Canadian Government acquired the railway company. In 1918, Canadian Government Railways built a short stretch of track to join the line with its part of the National Transcontinental Railway, and in 1919 and '20, a short (2.66 mile) line was built from Tide Head to Christopher Brook (now Glencoe), to replace the old 7.4 mile line from Campbellton. The line became a part of CN's network in 1923.

In its latter years, in excess of 95% of the traffic operating consisted of forestry products. Carload traffic had been steadily increasing since 1982 but was not enough to render the railway profitable, as traffic was shorthaul in nature.

On April 6, 1983, CN applied to the Canadian Transport Commission to allow them to abandon the line. More than two years later, in June 1985, CN was ordered to continue operation. In 1988, the application was being reconsidered, and in 1989, permission was given to abandon the rail line.

Total Carloads/Year
| Year | Total Carloads |
|---|---|
| 1985 | 2680 |
| 1986 | 2971 |
| 1987 | 1780 |

Total Revenue/Costs/Losses
| Year | Total Revenue | Total Costs | Total Losses |
|---|---|---|---|
| 1985 | $1,249,991 | $2,279,367 | $1,029,376 |
| 1986 | $1,336,262 | $2,863,768 | $1,527,506 |
| 1987 | $976,246 | $2,265,182 | $1,288,936 |

== Stations ==
Stations (Northeast to Southwest)
| Location | Mileage (Miles) | Kilometres |
|---|---|---|
| Upsalquitch | 13.5 | 21.7 |
| Millerville | 21.3 | 34.3 |
| Barbarie | 32.6 | 52.5 |
| Kedgwick | 49.7 | 80 |
| Saint-Quentin | 65.1 | 104.7 |
| Jardine Brook | 73.1 | 117.6 |
| Violette Brook | 83.6 | 134.5 |
| Veneer | 86.8 | 139.7 |
| Flemming | 97.1 | 156.2 |
