= Lake Champlain and St. Lawrence Junction Railway =

Overview
- Locale: Quebec, Canada
- Dates of operation: 1879–

Technical
- Track gauge: 4 ft 8 1/2 in (1,435 mm) standard gauge
- Previous gauge: , 3 ft 6 in (1,067 mm) until 1881

The Lake Champlain and St. Lawrence Junction Railway was a historic Canadian narrow-gauge railway operating in the Richelieu River valley of Quebec. The 1871 charter of the Philipsburg, Farnham and Yamaska Railway Company was renamed in 1875 and commenced operation between Stanbridge and Saint-Guillaume in October 1879. The 100-kilometre (62-mile) line was leased to the South Eastern Railway (SER) in 1880. The rail line and locomotives were converted to standard gauge in 1881. The railway economy was based on agricultural products including hay shipped to cities of the eastern United States as feed for horses pulling delivery wagons. The line was leased to the Canadian Pacific Railway in 1887 and survived into the 21st century as part of the CPR Farnham Division.

== Narrow-gauge locomotives ==
Number	Builder	Type	Date	SER number	SER name
1	Canadian Locomotive Company	4-4-0	1879	19	Saint Pie
2	Canadian Locomotive Company	4-4-0	1879	20	Abbotsford
3	Canadian Locomotive Company	4-4-0	1879	21	Bedford
4	Canadian Locomotive Company	4-4-0	1879	22	L'Ange Gardien
