= Montreal and Bytown Railway Company =

Defunct railway company, Lower Canada

The Montreal and Bytown Railway Company was a Canadian railway company. Chartered in August 1853, the company built a line between Montreal and Bytown, which is now known as Ottawa. It was declared insolvent in 1858 and was acquired by the Carillon and Grenville Railway Company in 1859.
