= Montreal, Portland and Boston Railway =

Map

The Montreal, Portland and Boston Railway was an international railroad located in northern Vermont and southern Quebec. In 1871 it was formed as the Montreal, Chambly, and Sorel Railway Company, a company which constructed their line from Saint Lambert opposite Montreal to Chambly. Upon merging with the Missisquoi Junction Railway Company in 1874, it retained its name. In 1875 it became the Montreal, Portland and Boston Railway Company, with the intent of creating a new Montreal to Boston route via the Portland and Ogdensburg Railroad. To achieve this, the MP&B extended their line from Chambly to Frelighsburg, Quebec, and to Sheldon, Vermont in 1881; at Sheldon Junction it connected with the P&O.

The failure of the P&O also marked the downfall of the MP&B, and in 1883 traffic had declined enough that the tracks south of Farnham were abandoned and removed, only a year after the line's completion. In 1886 and 1888, the company and its former management were involved in litigation in Montreal concerning debts and possible fraud. The line was sold to the Central Vermont Railway and reorganized as the Montreal and Province Line Railway in 1898, which restored the line north of Frelighsburgh in 1901.

== See also ==
- St. Lawrence and Atlantic Railroad
