= Montreal and Lachine Railroad =

19th-century railroad in Quebec, Canada

Map

The Montreal and Lachine Railroad was Montreal's first railroad. The railroad was opened on November 19, 1847, with service between Bonaventure Station in Montreal and the St. Lawrence River in Lachine. Built to bypass the Lachine Rapids, it was 12 km long. The railway merged with the Lake St. Louis and Province Railroad in 1850 under the name Montreal and New York Railroad. In 1857, it merged with the Champlain and St. Lawrence Railroad as the Montreal and Champlain Railroad. It would eventually be absorbed by the Grand Trunk Railway.

== Tokens ==
The railway used token coins after it was found that train tickets were not convenient for use among the Indians and workmen on the Lachine Canal, who formed the bulk of company's third class travel. Imported from Birmingham, where they were made by Boulton & Watt or Ralph Heaton & Sons, the tokens were strung on a wire as they were collected by the conductor. The tokens were issued in 1847 and used until the early 1860s, with the image of a train locomotive on one side and a beaver on the other.
