= Dominion Timber and Minerals Railway =

Coordinates: 45°43′20″N 74°34′46″W

The Dominion Timber and Minerals Railway was a private standard-gauge railroad that operated in the Laurentian Mountains of Southwestern Quebec, Canada from 1916 to 1981. Owned by Canadian Refractories Limited, the railway's 20 km mainline stretched from CRL's magnesite mine in Kilmar, through an extremely rugged mountain route to its final terminus at Marelan. Originally a narrow-gauge railway from 1916 to 1933, the Dominion Timber and Minerals Railway expanded to include a 65-ton locomotive and several freight cars.

Due to rising operating costs and decreasing sustainability, the railway was decommissioned in 1981, with many of the railway ties being dumped into lakes along the route by workmen. Until 2012 the abandoned rail route has been popular among ATV and dirt bike riders, however the upcoming sale of the land will permanently limit trespassing on this now-closed trail.
