= Instituto Nacional de Rehabilitación =

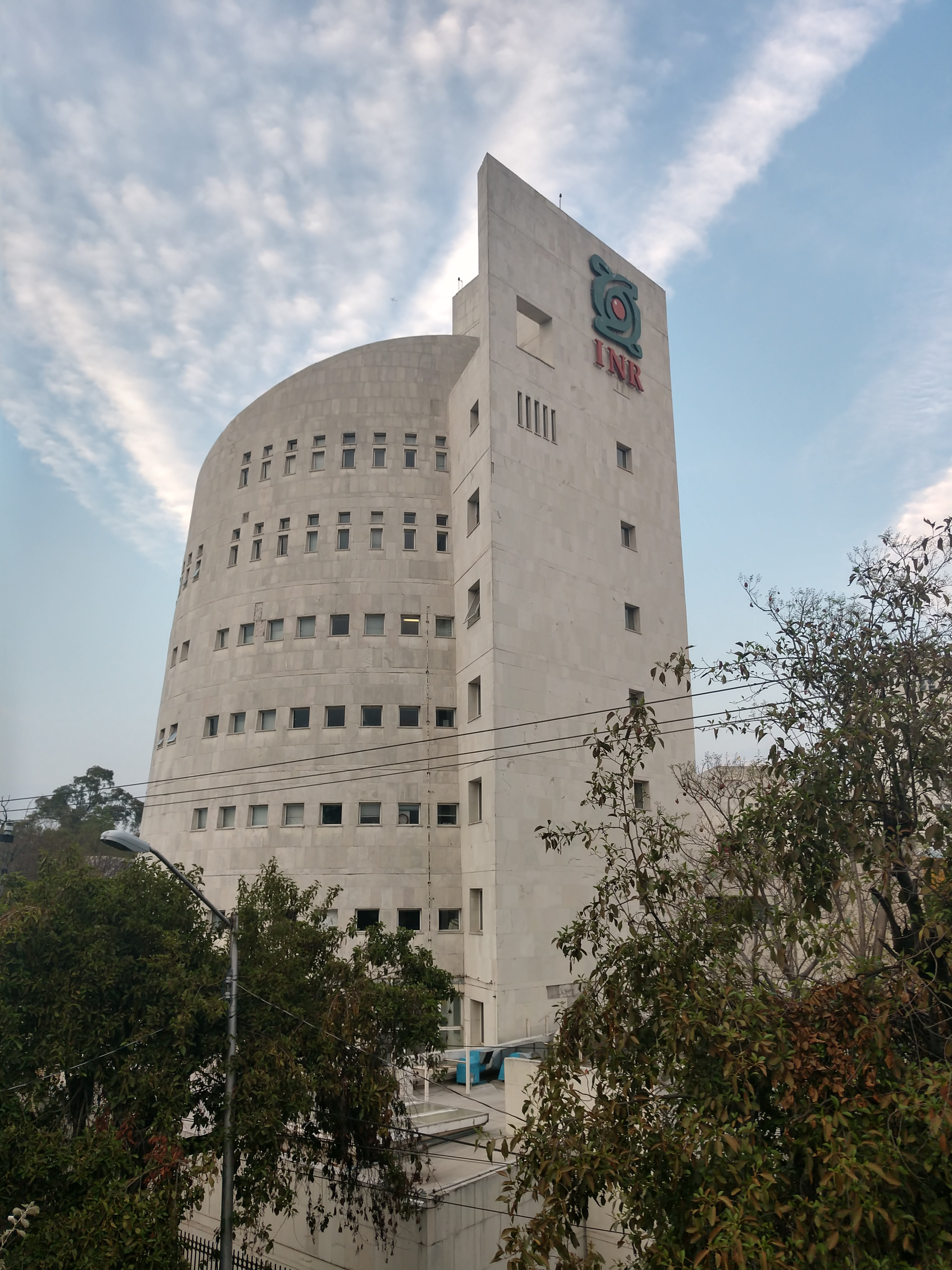

Instituto Nacional de Rehabilitación (transl. National Institute of Rehabilitation, abbreviated as INR) is a public institution that belongs to Mexico's Secretariat of Health, specializing in physical rehabilitation. The institute is funded by Mexico's Federal Government. It is located in the Tlalpan borough (Alcaldía, transl. Town Hall, previously Delegación, transl. delegation) of Mexico City.

Its main objective is the care of disabilities and the training of specialists. Fundadores Luis Guillermo Ibarra I; J.Clemente Ibarra P; J.Medinaveita V; Eduardo Cerón, Genaro Rico, Daniel Chávez, Gustavo del Toro, Pilar Díez, Matilde Enriquez, Rosa E.Escobar, Alejandro Espinosa, Guadalupe Garera, Leticia González, Josefina Gutierrez, Eric Hazán, Víctor Ilizaliturri, Antonio León, Renan León, Norberto Leyva, Francisco Martínez, Antonio Olín, Refugio Pacheco, Ivette Quiñones, Alejandro Reyes, Cayetano Trejo, Alberto Vargas e Hilda Villegas

== Specialities ==
The main specialties provided in the Institute are:

- Audiology, Phoniatrics, and Speech-language pathology.
- Orthopedics
- Physiatry
- Burn center
- Sports Medicine
- Ophthalmology
- Otorhinolaryngology
- Anesthesiology
- Plastic Surgery
