= Champlain and St. Lawrence Railroad =

First Canadian public railway (opened 1836)

Overview
- Locale: Quebec, Canada with a line into New York state
- Dates of operation: 1836–1857

Technical
- Track gauge: 4 ft 8 1/2 in (1,435 mm) standard gauge

The Champlain and St. Lawrence Railroad (C&SL) was a historic railway in Lower Canada, the first Canadian public railway and one of the first railways built in British North America.

== Origin ==
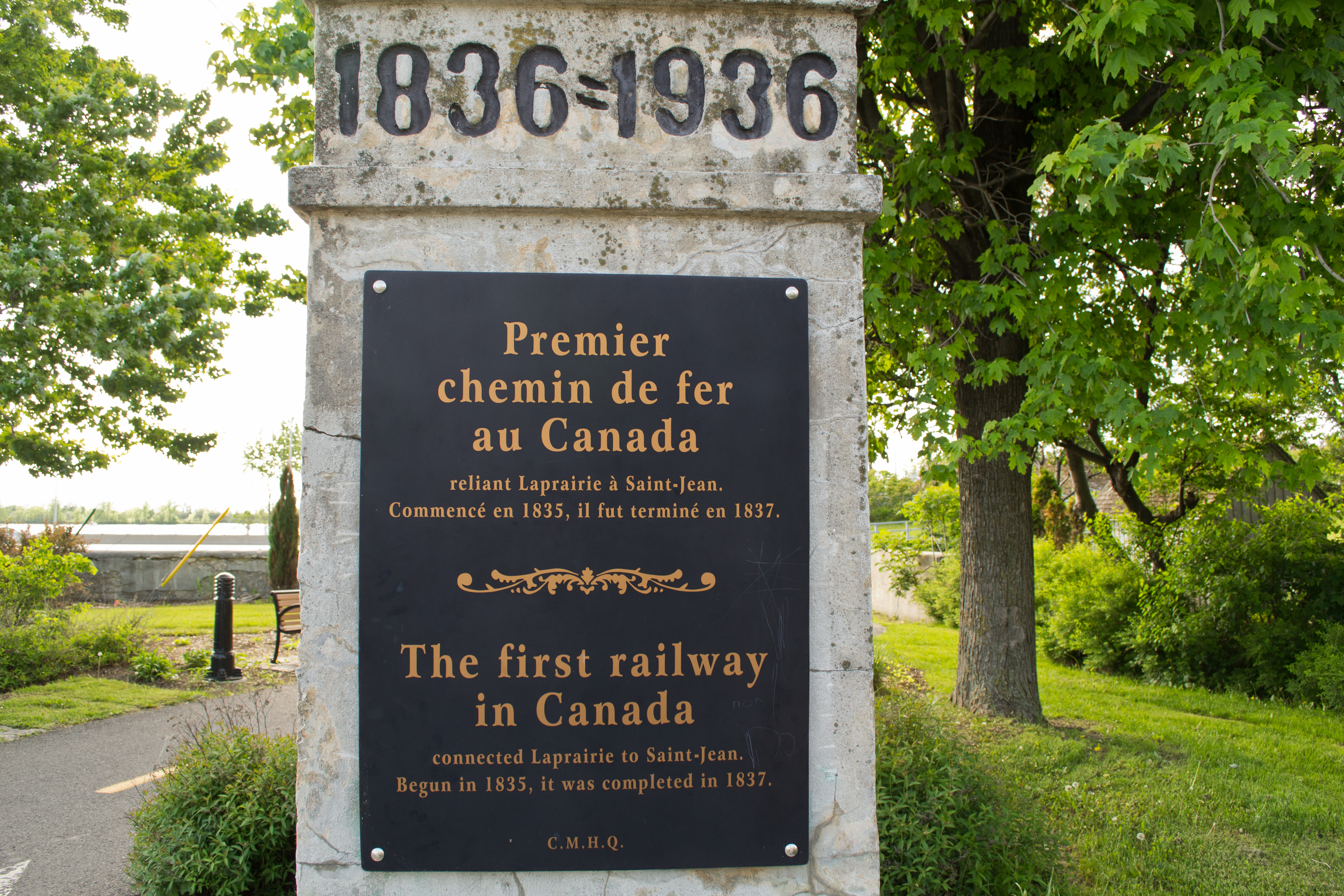
A monument marking the location of the first railway in Canada in La Prairie, Quebec.

The C&SL was financed by Montreal entrepreneur and brewery owner, John Molson. It was intended as a portage road to connect the St. Lawrence River valley with Lake Champlain, cutting time from the trip between Montreal and New York. Construction began in January, 1835 when surveyors determined the line would run from St. John on the Richelieu River to the nearest point on the St. Lawrence at La Prairie, across the river from Montreal.

Throughout 1835 the grading, fencing, masonry and bridge work were completed, as well as stations and wharves at Laprairie and St. John. Orders were also placed for a locomotive, which was to be built in Newcastle upon Tyne, as well as four passenger cars, which were to be built in the United States. Several freight cars were also built in Montreal.

The 16-mile (26 km) line was built as a 4 ft 8 1/2 in (1,435 mm) standard gauge railway, with rails consisting of 6-inch (152 mm) pine logs (squared off) which were joined by iron splice plates and bolts laid across wood cross-ties. The pine rails were protected by iron straps spiked to the upper surface. These rails remained the same until being replaced by completely iron rails in the 1850s.

British North America's first locomotive arrived at Molson's wharf in Montreal in June 1836. It was named Dorchester and had been constructed by Robert Stephenson, son of George Stephenson who was the manufacturer of The Rocket. A wood-burning 0-4-0 design, it was the 127th locomotive built by Stephenson and was nicknamed "Kitten" by those who observed its uneven "skittish" ride – a result of the short wheelbase. Trial runs took place at night to avoid frightening the public; maximum speed was approximately 30 mph (48 km/h).

The C&SL opened to great fanfare on July 21, 1836, with several distinguished guests in attendance besides Molson, including Lord Gosford, the Lieutenant-Governor of Lower Canada, as well as Louis-Joseph Papineau, the rebel politician. Over 300 guests crowded the passenger cars in Laprairie station for the first run. The Dorchester was unable to handle such a load, therefore the two first-class coaches carrying 32 of the distinguished guests were uncoupled and hauled by the locomotive while the remaining cars were hauled by teams of horses. Two hours later, everyone was at the station in St. John where the ceremonies continued.

in 1999, the Dorchester was inducted into the North America Railway Hall of Fame. Due to its unique status as the first locomotive used in Canada, it was recognized for its contribution to the railway industry as "Rolling Stock" in the "National" category.

== Growth and eventual merging ==
Regular operations commenced on July 25 and while freight traffic was stagnant on the line for many years, passenger traffic and excursions proved extremely popular early on, with many extra passenger trains being hauled by horses until additional locomotives arrived in 1837. Charles Dickens even rode the line. The line was extended south along the Richelieu River valley in 1851 to Rouses Point, New York and the following year saw a more direct routing built from the St. John-Laprairie line to St. Lambert, directly opposite Montreal to avoid the indirect journey up and down the St. Lawrence River from Laprairie. This latter line effectively reduced the line into Laprairie to branch line status and it would be later abandoned.

The C&SL merged with the Montreal and New York Railroad in 1857, formerly known as the Montreal and Lachine Railroad, with the new company being named the Montreal and Champlain Railroad. The Grand Trunk Railway leased the M&C in 1864 and purchased it outright in 1872.

In 1923 the GTR was nationalized and the ex-M&C, née-C&SL trackage was incorporated into the Canadian National Railways (CNR). CN (post-1960) continues to operate the majority of this historic route, running from an interchange connection with the Delaware and Hudson Railway (now owned by Canadian Pacific Railway) at Rouses Point, New York, through Saint-Jean and on to Saint-Lambert. The line from Rouses Point to Brossard is now CN's Rouses Point Subdivision.

== New York company ==
The approximately 1.2 miles (1.9 km) between Rouses Point and the New York/Quebec border were owned by a separate company, also called the Champlain and St. Lawrence Railroad, incorporated in New York on February 26, 1851. It was merged into the Canadian National Railway at the end of 1960.

== Culture ==
C&SL Railroad was immortalized by Canadian country music artist Orval Prophet on his "Judgement Day Express" album (1973) with the song "Champlain and St. Lawrence Line"

In 1986, for the World's Fair Exhibition in Vancouver called Expo 86, the Molsons donated a functional replica of the steam engine used to ferry travellers and goods on the C&SL Railway.

== Gallery ==
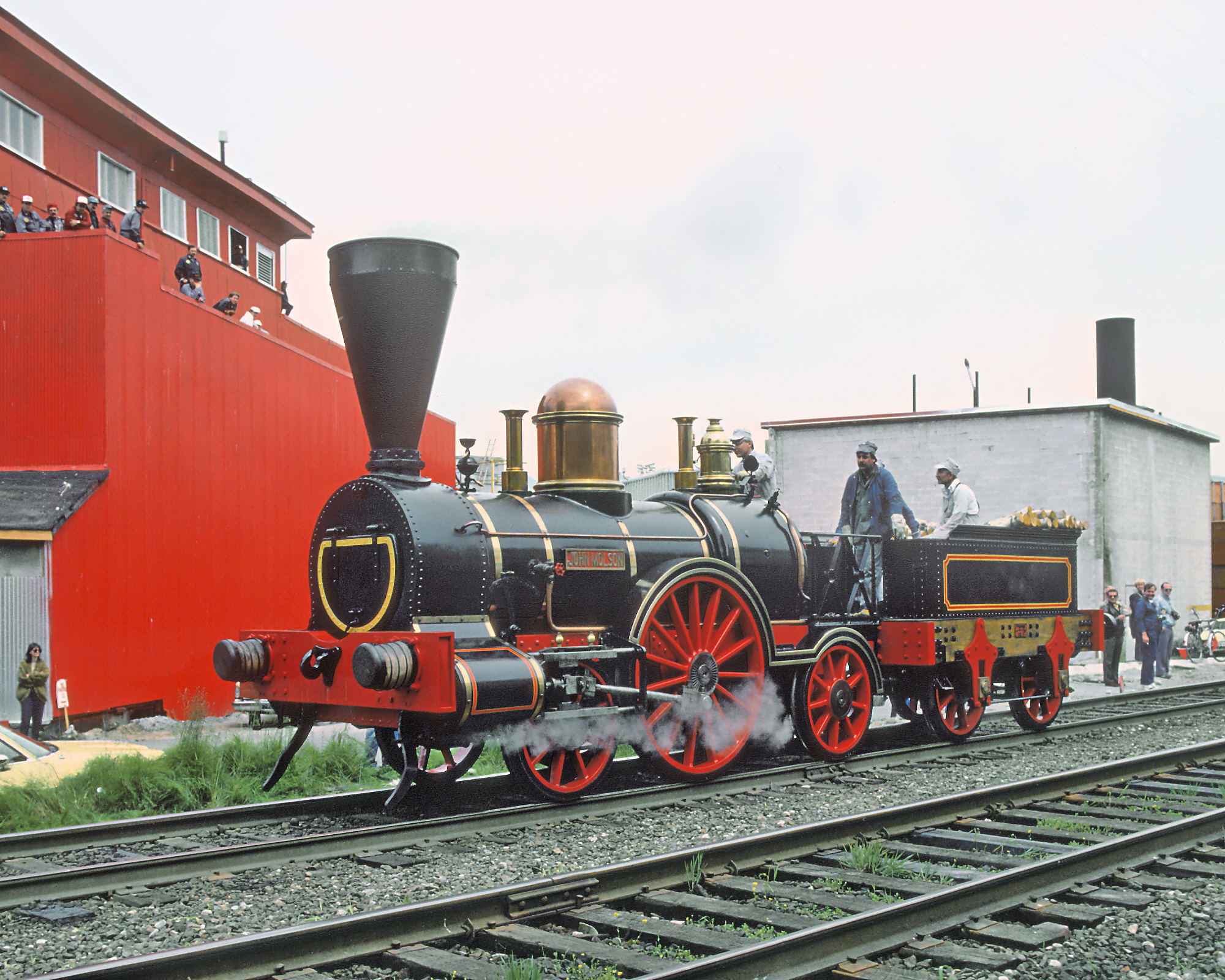
In the Steam Expo Parade of Canadian and U.S. steam locomotives at the 1986 World Exposition on Transportation and Communication (Expo 86), a World's Fair held in Vancouver, BC, Canada

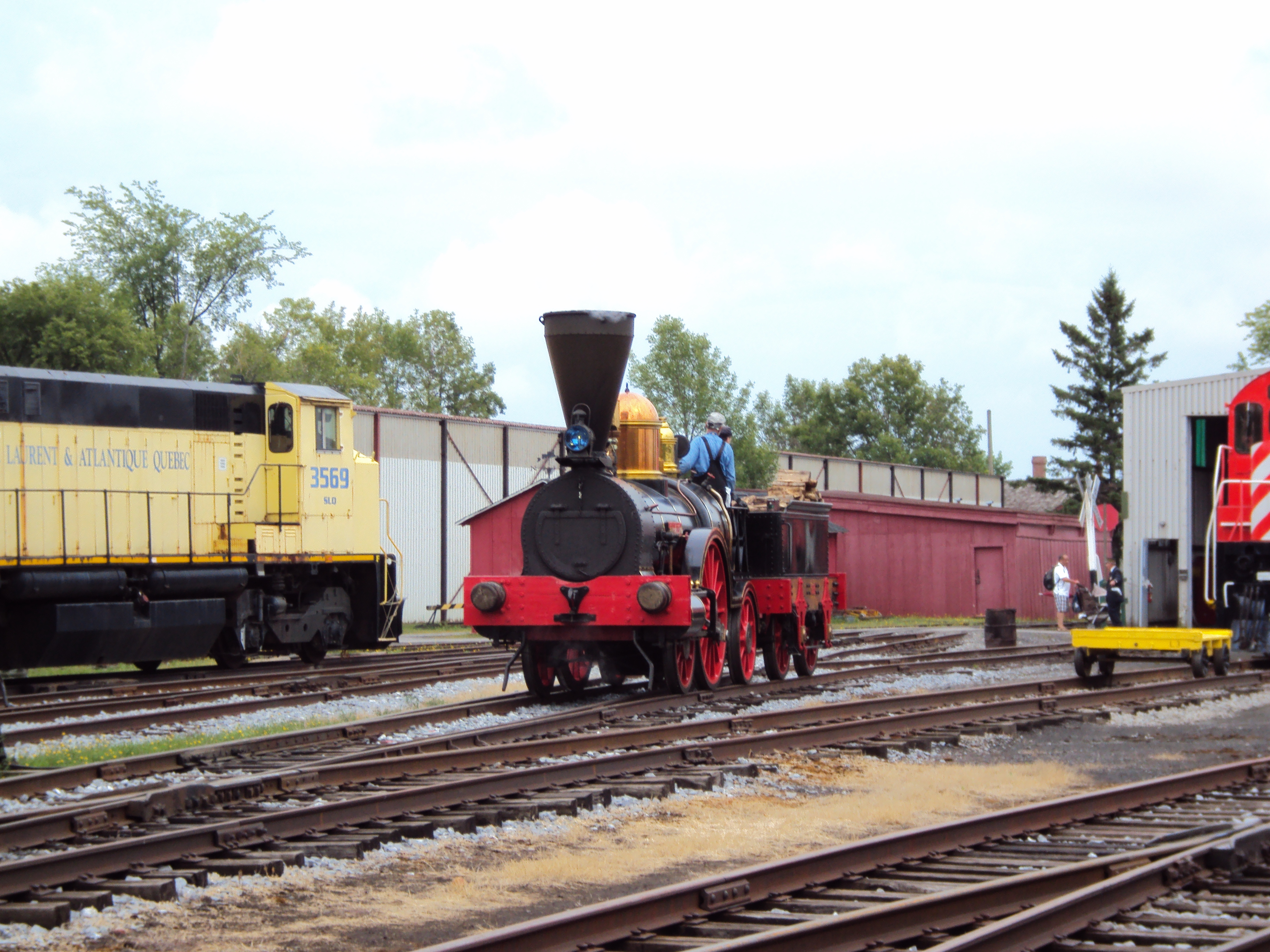
Exporail Museum, John Molson Steam Locomotive reproduction, in action in front of the depot

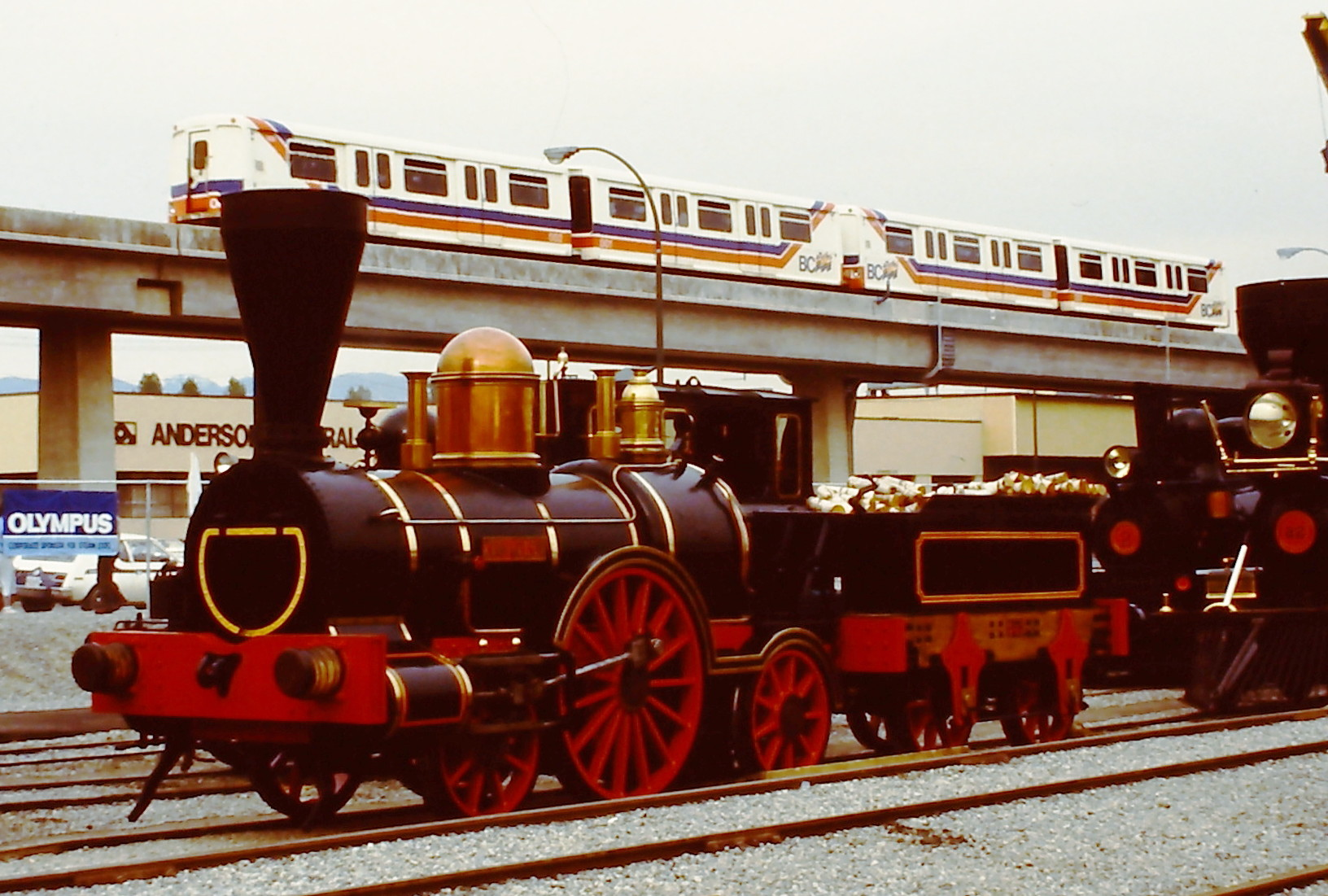
The John Molson replica on Expo 86 in Vancouver

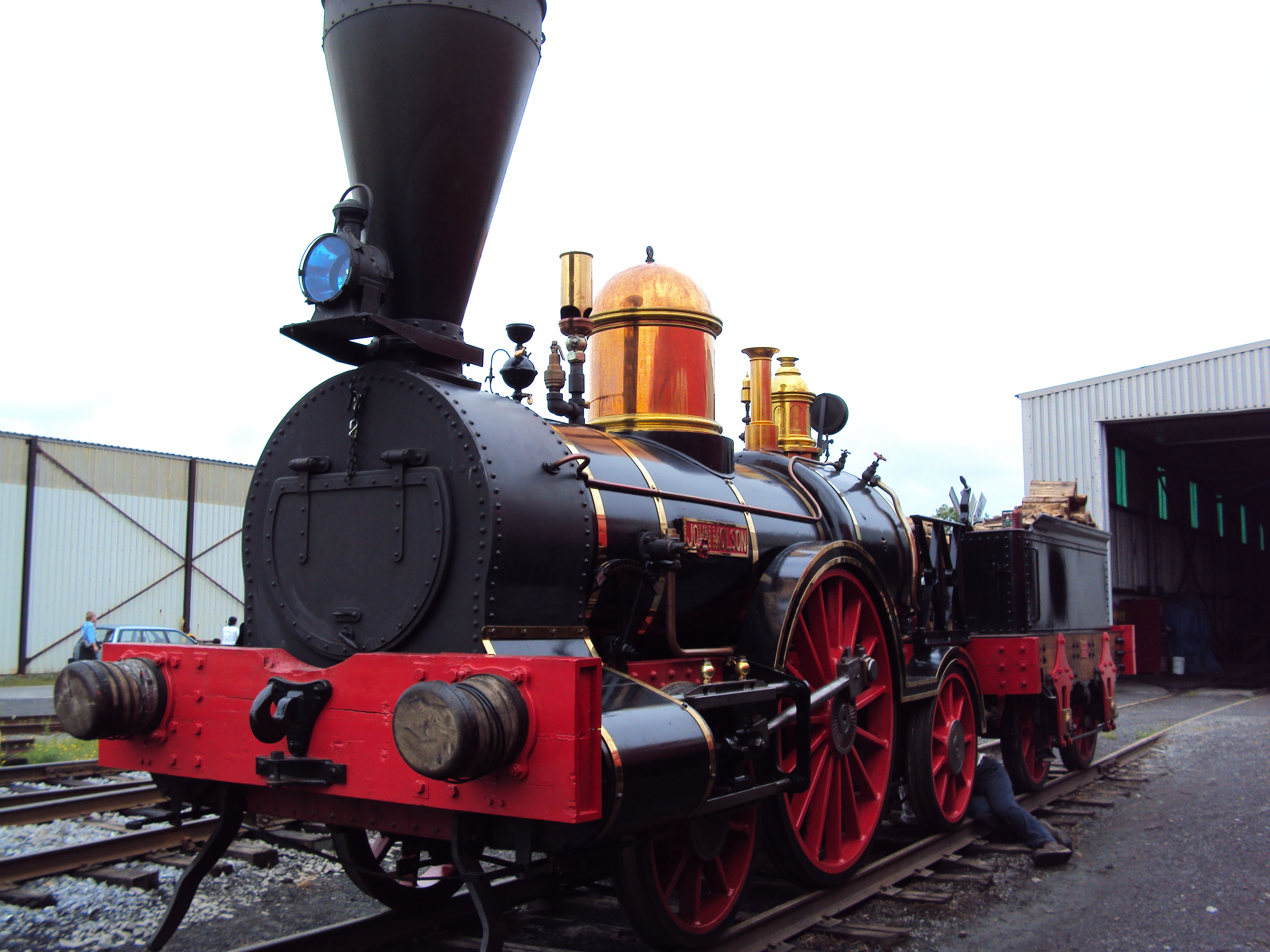
Exporail Museum, John Molson Steam Locomotive reproduction

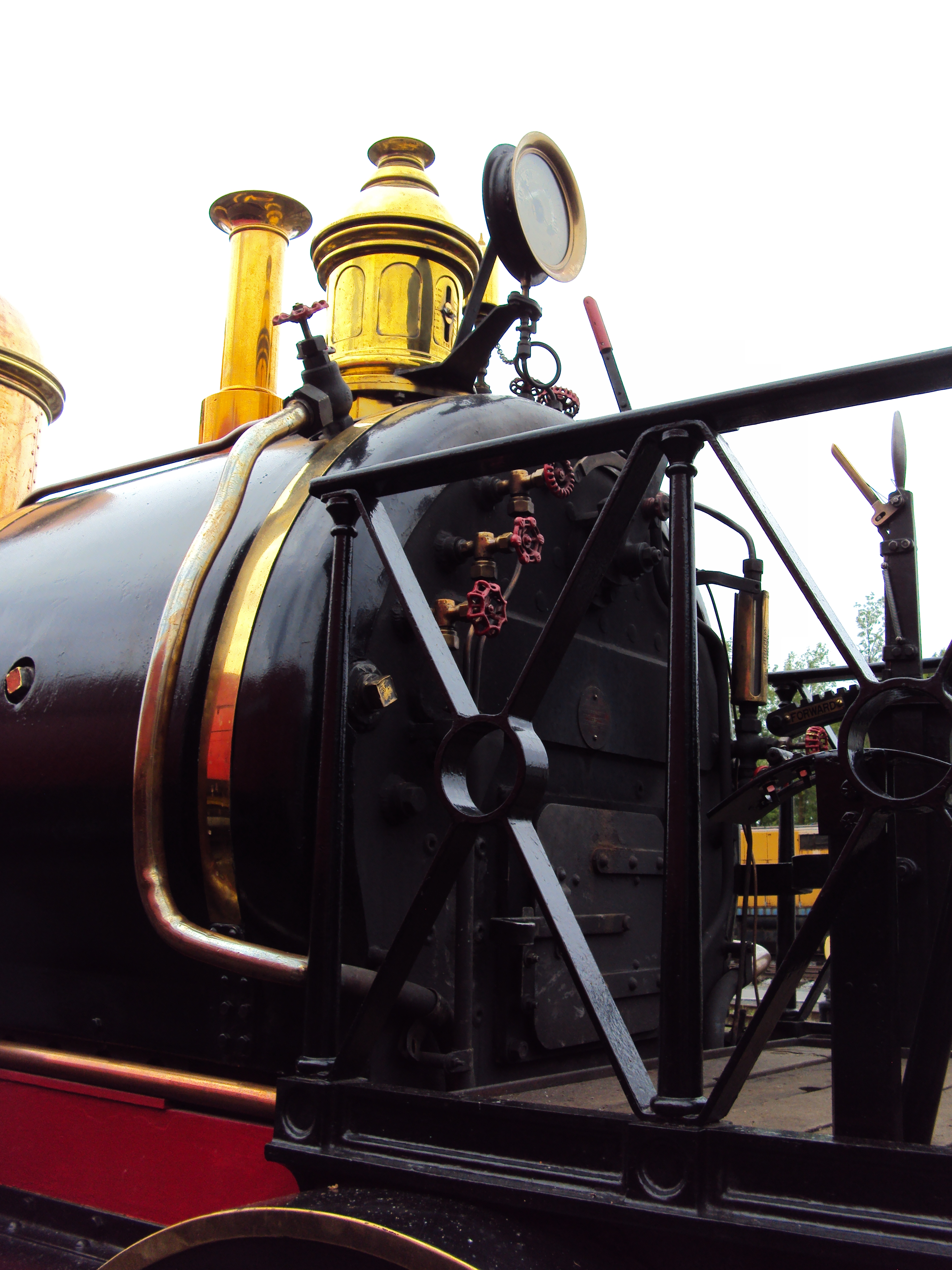
Exporail Museum, John Molson Steam Locomotive reproduction, interior view

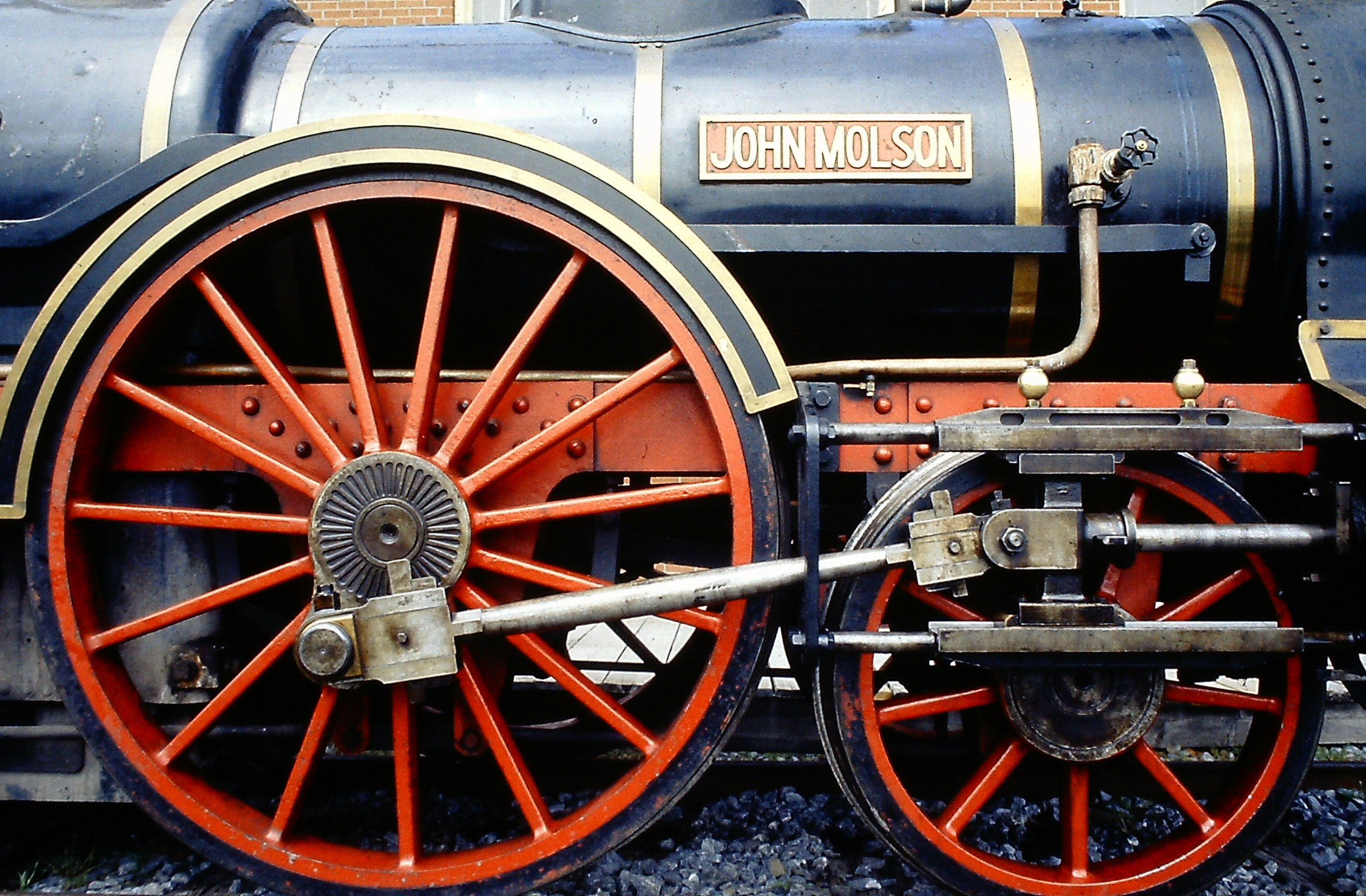
The Wheels of the engine.

== See also ==
- History of rail transport in Canada
- List of defunct Canadian railways
- Plateway
- Rail tracks
- Wagonway
