= Quebec, Montreal, Ottawa and Occidental Railway =

Canadian train operator

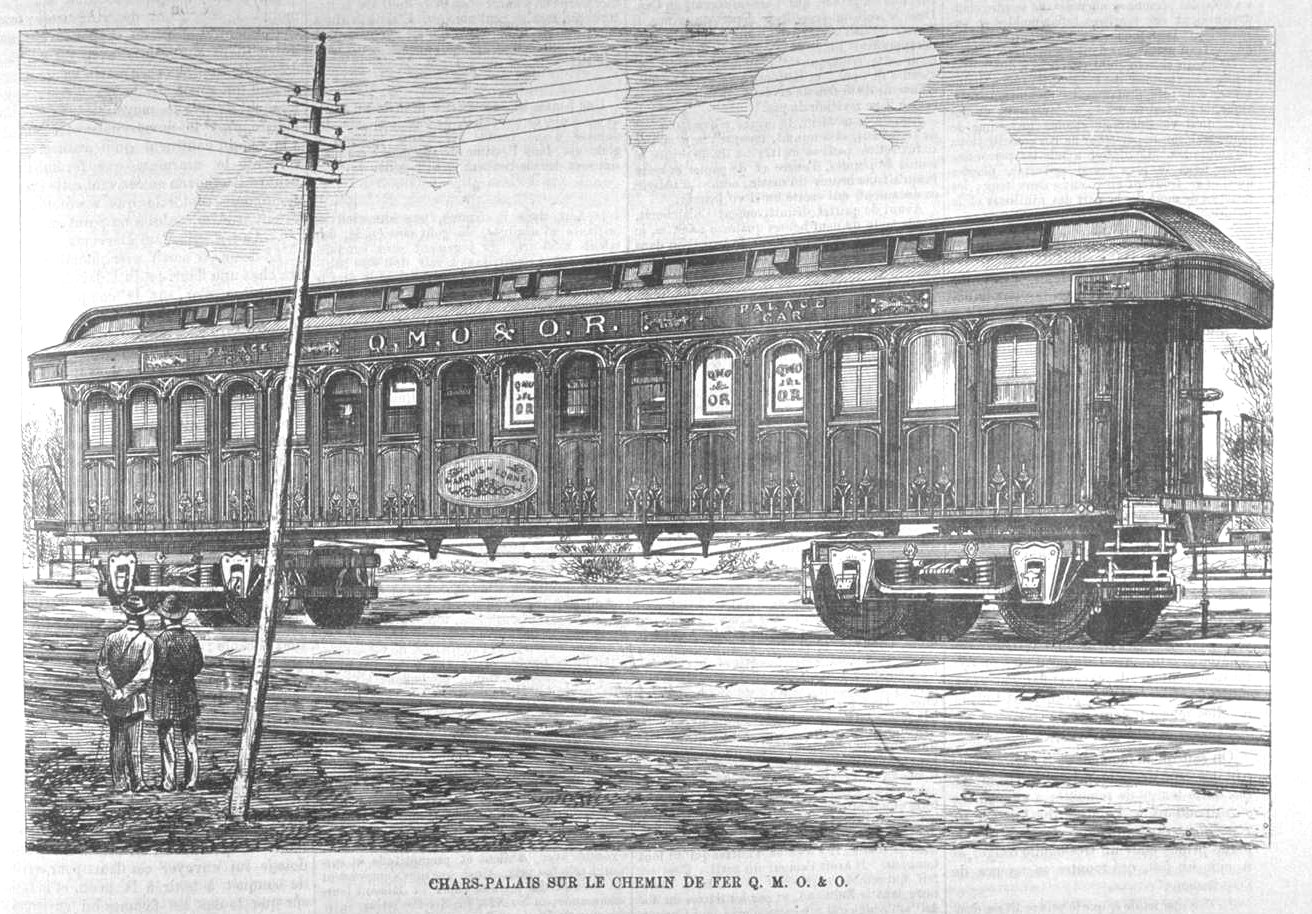
Quebec, Montreal, Ottawa and Occidental Railway palace car, engraving circa 1879

The Canadian province of Quebec formed the Quebec, Montreal, Ottawa and Occidental Railway (QMO&OR) in 1874 to link those cities since private companies, without the usual subsidies from the Federal Government of Canada, could not get financing, mainly because the Grand Trunk Railway was lobbying against it.

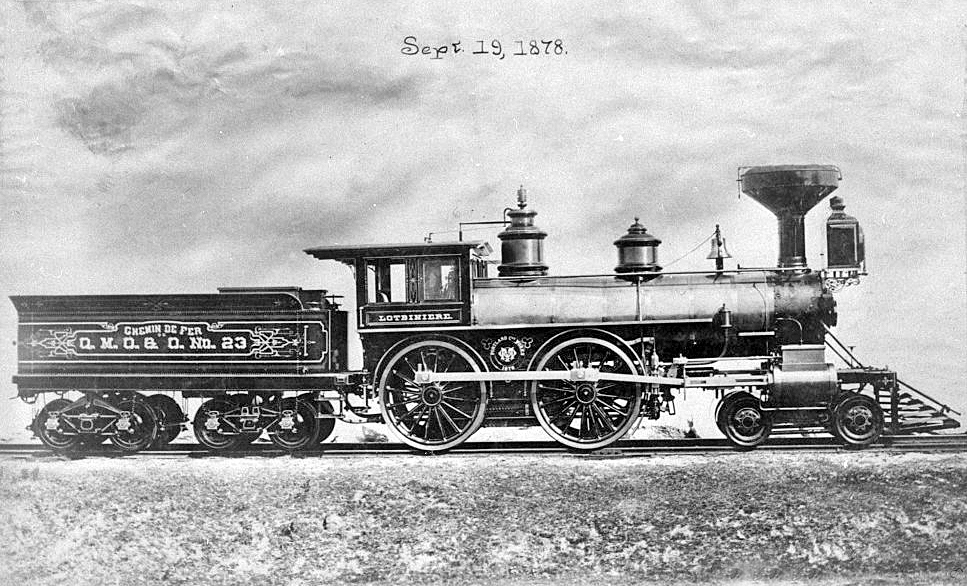
Quebec, Montreal, Ottawa and Occidental Railway steam locomotive named after Prime Minister, 1878

This project was a priority for the premier of the province of Quebec, Sir Henri-Gustave Joly de Lotbinière. It was the first major railway along the north shore of the Ottawa and St. Lawrence Rivers. The promoters of its predecessor companies had hoped to be part of the Canadian transcontinental railway project, a goal which was finally achieved when the QMO&OR was sold to the Canadian Pacific Railway (CPR).

== Two projects that failed to get financing ==
In 1853, the Quebec City bourgeoisie initiated the Quebec North Shore Railway project between Quebec and Montreal; the project was reactivated around 1870 when Quebec City promised a million-dollar subsidy. In 1869, Curé (parson) Antoine Labelle initiated the Montréal Colonization Railway project between Montreal and St-Jérôme to promote colonization and facilitate the delivery of firewood; in 1872, Montreal businessmen became interested with the project, planning to reach Ottawa. Financing came from London and the British-owned Grand Trunk Railway lobbied secretly against the projects.

== Construction period ==
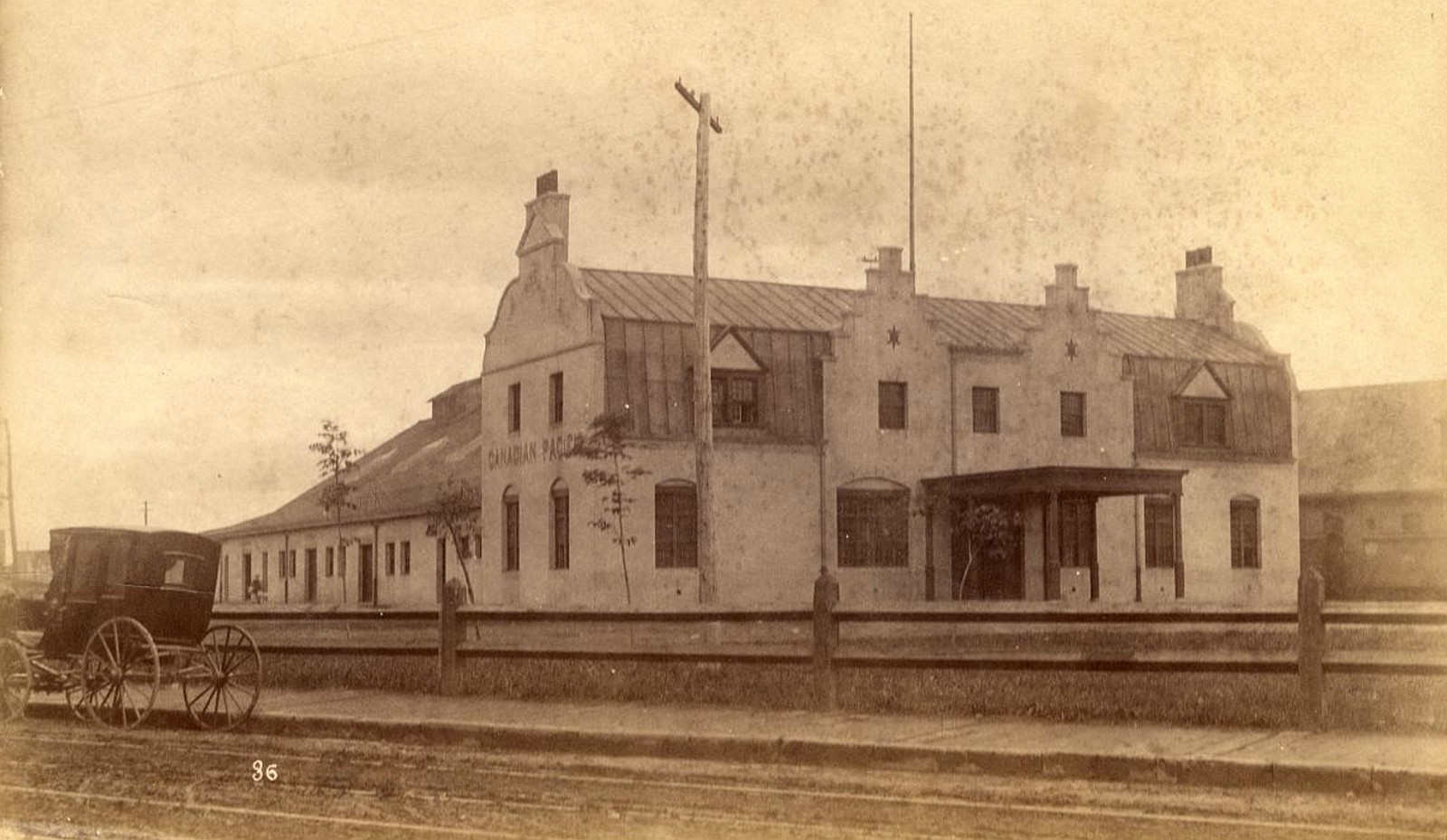
First Palais Station

In 1872, the North Shore Railway started the construction. The Palais station was built in Quebec City around this period. From Quebec, the railway ran a few miles north of the St-Lawrence river: Lorette, St-Augustin, Pont-Rouge (bridge constructed in 1874), St-Basile, Portneuf, Deschambault, La Chevrottière and Grondines (1902 Map of Great Northern Railway of Canada and CPR formerly QMO&OR or North Shore Railway). On December 24, 1875 the North Shore Railway transferred its properties to the QMO&OR. The Quebec-Montreal section (with Piles branch; Cap-de-la-Madeleine, east of Trois-Rivières, to les Piles), and the Montreal-Aylmer section (with St-Jerome branch which was completed in 1876) were completed at the end of 1877.

The QMO&OR was the first railway to connect the city of Hull to Montreal and Quebec City (1879 Tourist's Guide du Touriste Quebec & Ottawa). In 1880, it crossed the Ottawa River over the Prince of Wales Bridge to a junction in Ottawa with the Canada Central Railway. It thus linked the Chaudière Falls sawmills to Montreal and to the United States via Brockville.

== Construction cost ==
The Quebec Government paid $11.5 million; Quebec City, Montreal and other municipalities paid $2.5 million. Since the Federal Government always gave subsidies to private companies for similar projects, the Quebec Government lobbied in Ottawa and finally obtained a subsidy of $2.4 million in 1884.

== Sale to private railway companies ==
In March 1882, the QMO&OR western division (Montreal-Ottawa) was sold for $4 million to Canadian Pacific Railway (newly formed on 15 February 1881). A new Montreal terminal was then built at Dalhousie Square, from which the first Canadian transcontinental departed on June 28, 1886. The same year, the Quebec-Montreal section was sold, for $4 million, to a group led by Louis-Adélard Sénécal, officer of the QMO&O; there was a political scandal and Sénécal rapidly sold his shares, at a large profit, to the Grand Trunk Railway which now had the monopoly on the south and north shores of the St-Lawrence river; in 1885, the Federal Government bought the section and sold it back to the CPR. The CPR did not meet all expectations of the Quebec bourgeoisie: the company chose Montreal as its headquarters and expanded the railway east through the Eastern Townships and Maine. In 1997, CPR sold its railway north of the St-Lawrence river to Quebec Gatineau Railway.

== Piles branch ==
In 1857, Joseph-Édouard Turcotte formed the St. Maurice Railway & Steam, incorporated to the North Shore Railway the next year; the project included a navigation line on Saint-Maurice River between Les Piles and La Tuque. In 1878, the QMO&OR built the railway between Cap-de-la-Madeleine (3 miles east of Trois-Rivières) and Les Piles (Grandes-Piles is situated upstream of Grand-Mère and Shawinigan falls; the site was used for sorting, piling and transshipping of logs floated on St-Maurice river).

In 1878, the St. Lawrence, Lower Laurentian & Saguenay Railway was created to build a railway between Trois-Rivières and lake St-John; in 1888 the name was changed to the Lower Laurentian Railway and it built a line between Garneau junction (Piles branch) and Hervey. In 1895, the Quebec and Lake St-John Railway bought the line which reached Rivières-à-Pierre in 1901. That same year, the Great Northern of Canada built a line between Garneau and Hawkesbury (Ontario) so it could reach Quebec city where it operated a grain silo, (via the Lower Laurentian Railway to Rivière-à-Pierre and the Quebec and lake St-John Railway).

== St-Jérôme branch ==
On 16 October 1876, the QMO&OR opened a railway between Hochelaga (corner of Ste-Catherine street and Harbour, Montreal) and St-Jérôme. The Quebec Government made Antoine Labelle (parson of St-Jérôme) responsible for the colonization (settlement); Labelle sought the construction of a railway north of St-Jérôme to stop the emigration of French Canadians towards New England.

The Montreal Northern Colonization Railway Company, formed on 5 April 1869, was renamed Montreal, Ottawa & Western Company on 8 April 1875 and merged into the QMO&OR in December 1875. After the sale of this company's assets, its charter was used to restart a company in the Laurentians under the name of Montreal & Western Railway on 25 May 1883. On 1 September 1892, the St-Jérôme to Ste-Agathe line (30.5 miles) was opened and reached Labelle on 4 December 1893; the CPR leased the line from 1890 to 1897, then bought it on 25 March 1897.

On 10 July 1899, the Compagnie de Chemin de Fer de Colonisation du Nord (Northern Colonisation Railway) was formed to extend the railway to Mont-Laurier which was reached in 1909; the railway was leased by CPR for 999 years.

== Longueuil branch ==
In 1848, the Atlantic & St. Lawrence Railway was already exploiting a railway between Longueuil and St-Hyacinthe; it was later purchased by the Grand Trunk Railway which transferred to Montréal when the Victoria bridge was built. The QMO&OR bought it, but would not pay the excessive fee to use the Victoria bridge.

A car ferry across the St. Lawrence River between Hochelaga and Longueuil allowed connections with railways running into the United States. During four winters – 1880 to 1883 – rails were laid on the ice of the frozen river to allow trains to cross. (The St. Lawrence bridge, opened in 1887, resolved the problem once and for all.)
