= Canadian Government Railways =

Transport company

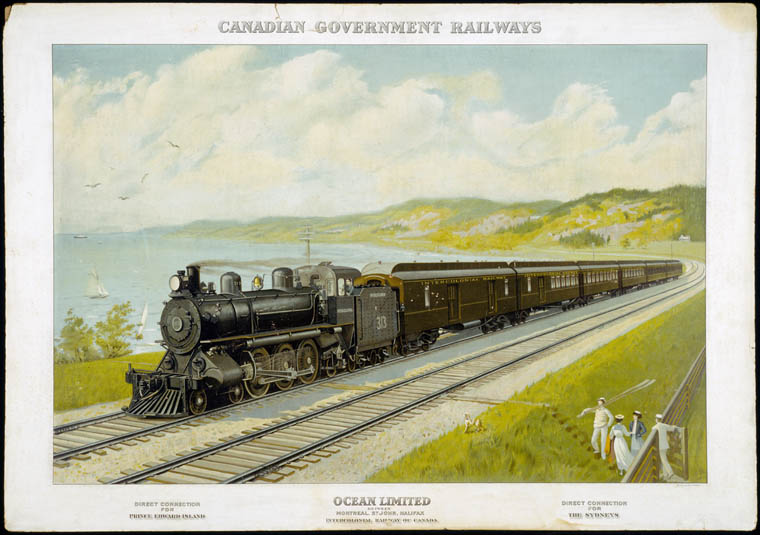
- The Ocean Limited run under the CGR.

Overview
- Reporting mark: CGR, IRC
- Locale: Manitoba, Ontario, Quebec, New Brunswick, Nova Scotia, Prince Edward Island
- Dates of operation: 1915–1918

Technical
- Track gauge: 4 ft 8 1/2 in (1,435 mm) standard gauge
- Previous gauge: 3 ft 6 in (1,067 mm) for PEI

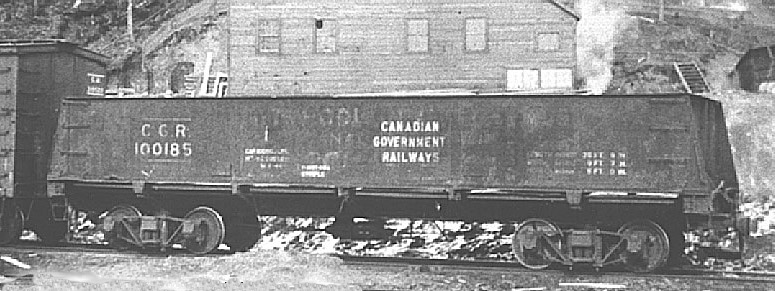
CGR 50-ton coal car, former Intercolonial Railway (faded paint can be seen).

Canadian Government Railways (reporting marks CGR, IRC) was the legal name used between 1915–1918 for all federal government-owned railways in Canada.

The principal component companies were the Intercolonial Railway of Canada (IRC), the National Transcontinental Railway (NTR), the Prince Edward Island Railway (PEIR), and the Hudson Bay Railway (HBR). There were also several minor branch railways in the province of New Brunswick that were acquired by CGR during this time.

The deepening financial crisis in Canada's railway industry toward the end of the First World War saw the majority of major railways across the country nationalized by the federal government. The CGR played a vital role in Canada's wartime effort, moving vast numbers of troops and supplies. A notable role was the relief and reconstruction in Halifax after the 1917 Halifax Explosion and one CGR employee, Vince Coleman became a celebrated hero in the explosion.

The first system to be taken over was the bankrupt Canadian Northern Railway (CNoR) on September 6, 1918, whereby the government-appointed Board of Management for CNoR was instructed to take responsibility for all CGR operations as well. Later that year, the federal government created the Canadian National Railways (CNR) as a means to simplify the funding and administration of the nationalized railway system, which was formally brought about by an order issued on December 20, 1918, by the Privy Council.

The Grand Trunk Pacific Railway (GTPR) was nationalized after defaulting on loan payments March 7, 1919, and entered the CNR fold on July 12, 1920. GTPR's parent company, the bankrupt Grand Trunk Railway (GTR) was nationalized on May 21, 1920, and was absorbed into the CNR on January 30, 1923.

Although the CGR only existed for a short period of time before evolving into the Canadian National Railway, it was a very visible Canadian railway in World War One due to the large scale of wartime railway operation. Large amounts of rolling stock were lettered for the CGR, although in many regions, such as the Maritimes, the public continued to refer to its trains and facilities by their old name of the Intercolonial. The CGR moniker ceased to be used after 1918, but the CGR itself existed on paper until the late 20th century, largely due to real estate leases and other agreements. A Privy Council order dated July 22, 1993, authorized the sale of CGR to the Crown corporation CN for one Canadian dollar.

== See also ==
- History of rail transport in Canada
- List of defunct Canadian railways
