= Ottawa Valley Railway =

Shortline rail road in the provinces of Ontario and Québec, Canada

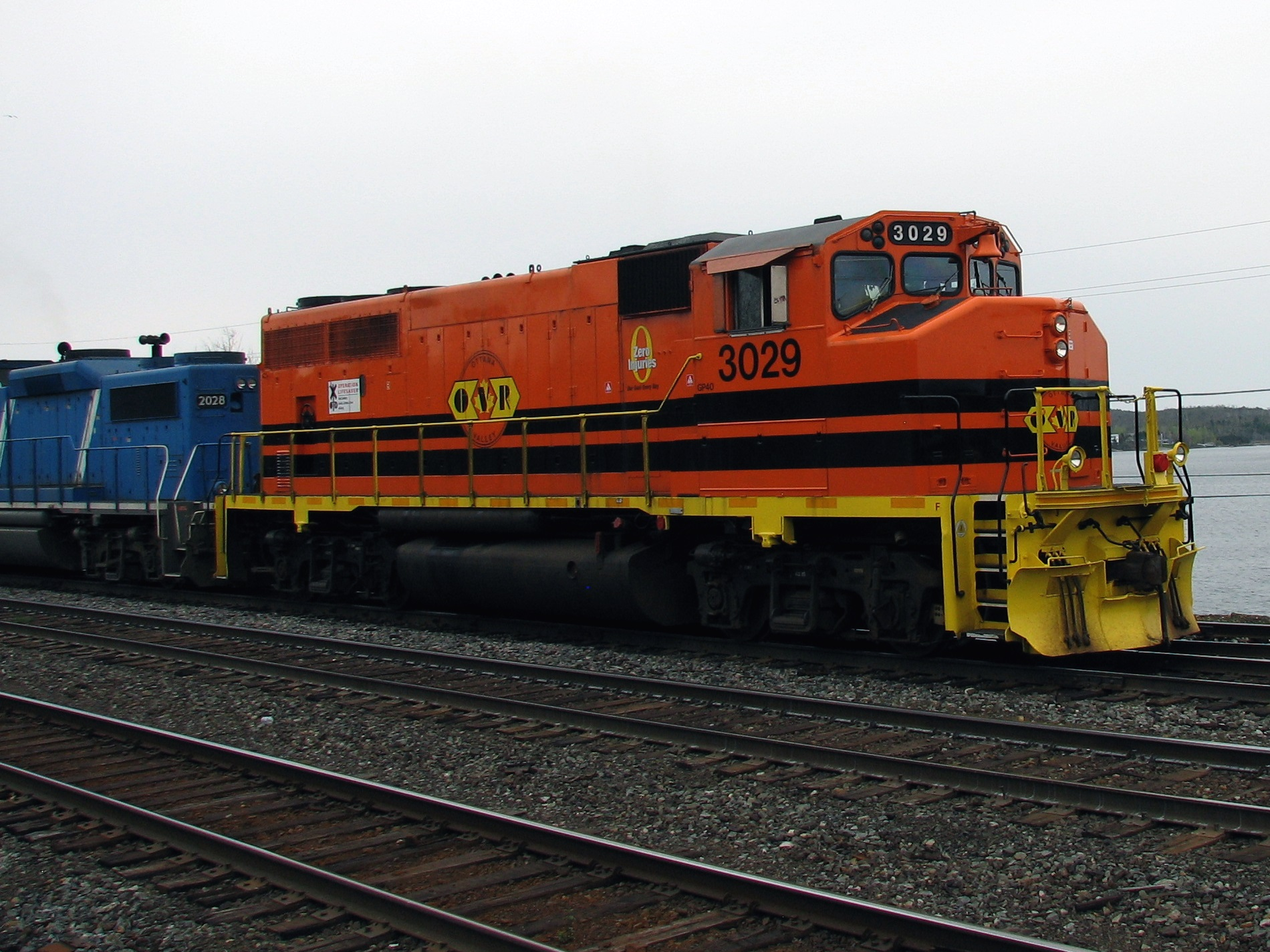
- RLK #3029 entering the CP Sudbury yard

Overview
- Parent company: Genesee and Wyoming
- Headquarters: North Bay, Ontario
- Reporting mark: RLK
- Locale: Ontario and Quebec, Canada
- Dates of operation: 1996–present
- Predecessor: Canadian Pacific Railway

Technical
- Track gauge: 1,435 mm (4 ft 8 1/2 in) standard gauge
- Length: 290 km (180 mi)

Other
- Website: gwrr.com/rlk

Ottawa Valley Railway (reporting mark RLK) is a Canadian railway that operates 180 miles (290 km) of track in the provinces of Ontario and Quebec, and is owned by Genesee & Wyoming Canada Inc., the Canadian subsidiary of Genesee & Wyoming Inc.

The railway began operations on 30 October 1996 under the auspices of RaiLink Canada, and fell under the control of RailAmerica after that company bought RaiLink in July 1999. It was formed to operate both local trains and through-service Canadian Pacific Railway trains between Sudbury, Ontario and Smiths Falls, Ontario. On July 23, 2012, Genesee & Wyoming Inc. announced that it intended to purchase RailAmerica in a deal valued at $1.39 billion. Approval of the purchase was granted by the U.S. Surface Transportation Board on December 19, 2012.

Currently, the OVR operates between Sudbury and Temiscaming, Quebec, reduced from its original routing between Sudbury and Smiths Falls with a branch to Temiscaming.

The rerouting came about as a result of the reduction of both local traffic on the line and through traffic operated by the Canadian Pacific. As traffic was reduced on other CP routes, that railway was able to redirect trains onto its lines through Toronto, and RailAmerica's lease on the line to the east of Petawawa, Ontario ended in December 2009. The OVR continued operating the route between Sudbury and Temiscaming, and in early October 2010, RailAmerica and CP reached a new agreement under which those operations would continue, while CP would continue procedures for ending service to the east of Mattawa. On 3 August 2011, it was announced that the rails between Renfrew and Pembroke, Ontario were planned to be removed by the end of the year, with the remainder of the Mattawa—Smiths Falls route to be removed in following years.

The OVR interchanges with the Canadian Pacific Kansas City (successor to the Canadian Pacific) and the Canadian National Railway at Sudbury, as well as the Ontario Northland Railroad at North Bay.

The railway once hauled around 70,000 carloads a year, the majority of which came from CP's intermodal bridge traffic. The rest of it was self-generated, and included chemicals and forest products. Very little of this traffic came from east of Mattawa. As of 2013, carloadings amount to approximately 8,000 per year.
