= South Eastern Railway (Quebec) =

Richelieu, Drummond, and Arthabaska Counties Railway known as South Eastern Railway

In 1866 the South Eastern Counties Junction Railway was incorporated to build from a point on the Stanstead, Shefford and Chambly Railroad to a point on the province line in the township of Potton, Quebec which was completed in 1873. Soon afterwards, the railway amalgamated with the Richelieu, Drummond and Arthabaska Counties Railway, the combined lines being known as the South Eastern Railway. The railway was an important link between Montreal and the New England States.

Amongst those associated with this railway were American-born Asa Belknap Foster (1817-1877) and Azro Buck Chaffee (1830-1891).

After many years of haphazard running and accumulated deficits, it was eventually taken over by the Canadian Pacific Railway which had leased the South Eastern in 1887 and which subsequently continued to operate the line.
