= Fay Richwhite =

Fay, Richwhite & Company is the investment vehicle of Switzerland-based New Zealand merchant bankers Sir Michael Fay and David Richwhite.

The company operated at the forefront of the country's economic deregulation ("Rogernomics") during the 1980s and 1990s, and became well known for corporate finance, state asset privatisation, and special partnerships.

== History ==
The company was formed in 1975. Sir Michael Fay, David Richwhite and Fay, Richwhite & Company were the founding pioneers of New Zealand's America’s Cup dynasty. Funding three legendary campaigns between 1987 and 1992, they transitioned Kiwi sailing from an amateur pastime into a professional, technologically dominant powerhouse.

Before Fay and Richwhite, New Zealand was largely viewed internationally as a remote, quiet agricultural economy.

They changed this perception not only through the creation of the Eurokiwi bond market, proving to Wall Street and European capitals that New Zealand was a sophisticated place to invest capital, but also through their America’s Cup campaigns. These were not just about sailing as they were also massive corporate hosting platforms to introduce global CEOs, tech tycoons, and billionaires to New Zealand businesses.

== Winebox Inquiry ==
The firm was the prime focus of the "Winebox Inquiry" which dealt with, among other things, tax-avoidance arrangements in the Cook Islands. The publicity surrounding the inquiry generated considerable public ill-feeling towards Fay and Richwhite, and was one of the principal reasons for their emigration to Geneva. Fay and Richwhite were investors in the Bank of New Zealand, which was sold to National Australia Bank in 1992.

Fay and Richwhite were also involved in a series of transactions between 1986 and 1993 involving their companies European Pacific Investments; Capital Markets; Fay, Richwhite; the Bank of New Zealand; Tranz Rail; and Telecom New Zealand, transactions in which they personally gained over half a billion dollars at the same time as their minority shareholders lost NZD$277 million. Fay and Richwhite also made NZD$274 million from sales of Telecom New Zealand share options in September 1993 without having to put up any capital in advance.

In 2000, the High Court ruled there was no conspiracy between BNZ and Fay Richwhite to avoid income tax.

Both men relocated to Geneva in the late 1990s and Richwhite has since moved to London.

== Tranz Rail ==
Fay and Richwhite were advisers to the New Zealand Government on New Zealand Rail Limited from 1990 to 1993 and then distanced themselves from the arrangement to sell the State-Owned Enterprise (SOE). The Bolger National government privatised New Zealand Rail Limited in 1993. The company was sold for $328.3 million to a consortium named Tranz Rail Limited, made up of Fay, Richwhite & Company (31.8% via the investment company Pacific Rail, later renamed Midavia Rail), the American railroad Wisconsin Central (27.3%), Berkshire Partners (27.3%), Alex van Heeren, the owner of Huka Lodge, 9.1% and Richwhite family interests, 4.5%. Tranz Rail borrowed $223.3 million, and its shareholders contributed $105 million to the acquisition price through the purchase of 105 million Tranz Rail shares at $1 each. Fay Richwhite later settled an insider trading claim by the Securities Commission for $27.5 million in June 2007 out of court.
