= David Richwhite =

New Zealand investment banker

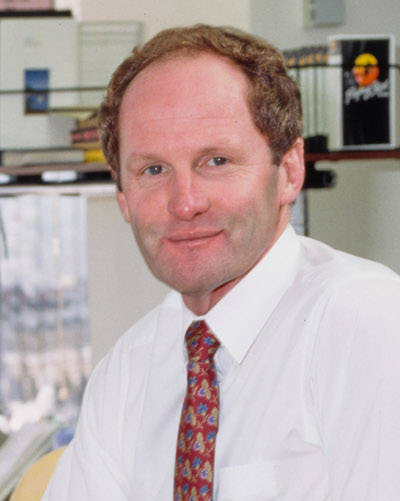
Richwhite during the 1990s

David MacKellar Richwhite (born 1948) is a New Zealand investment banker and was a partner in Fay, Richwhite & Company with Sir Michael Fay.

Educated at King's College, Auckland and the University of Otago, where he graduated in 1974 with a Bachelor of Commerce degree, Richwhite's personal wealth was largely acquired during the late 1980s and early 1990s. During this period he had a significant and controversial role in the structural adjustment of the New Zealand economy undertaken by the Fourth Labour Government.

Fay, Richwhite & Company was the prime focus of the "Winebox Inquiry" which dealt with, among other things, tax-avoidance arrangements in the Cook Islands. The publicity surrounding the inquiry generated considerable public ill-feeling towards Fay and Richwhite.

Based in Geneva from 1998 to 2003, Richwhite now lives with his family in London.

== Fay Richwhite ==
David Richwhite and Sir Michael Fay formed Fay Richwhite in 1973 which grew to become one of the leading merchant banks in Australasia during the 1980s and 1990s, with offices in New Zealand, Australia and London.

Whilst their business encompassed the full range of investment banking and trading services across many sectors, Fay Richwhite became most well known for its role in the privatisation of State Owned Enterprises (SOEs) in New Zealand. During the late 1980s, Fay Richwhite advised the New Zealand government on a number of asset sales and ultimately organised and co-invested in consortia which purchased some of these assets including:

- The Bank of New Zealand in 1989, in which Fay Richwhite purchased a 32% share via their company Capital Markets
- Telecom New Zealand in 1991 for NZD$4.5 billion with Ameritech
- Bell Atlantic and Freightways
- New Zealand Rail in 1993 for NZD$410 million with Wisconsin Central and Berkshire Partners.

Fay Richwhite went on to invest alongside Wisconsin Central, Berkshire Partners and Goldman Sachs in the purchase of four of the five United Kingdom national rail companies being privatised in 1996. Forming English, Welsh & Scottish Railway, the company ran 95% of British rail freight until it was sold to Deutsche Bahn in 2007.

Fay Richwhite was active throughout the 1980s and 1990s in other business activities including:

- Early-stage financing of the New Zealand film industry
- Oil exploration off the Taranaki coast (floating Cultus Petroleum)
- Early-stage financing of New Zealand's kiwifruit, apricot and deer farming industries
- Pioneering of the Eurokiwi bond market
- Acting as government advisor on forestry assets, the Tourist Hotel Corporation, the Government Printing Office, and Housing Corporation assets.

Richwhite personally chaired a steering committee which advised the New Zealand government on the sale of the state-owned Post Bank and was Deputy Chairman of the New Zealand Business Round Table from 1990 to 1997.

In the late 1990s, Fay Richwhite was sold to various partners.

Throughout the 1990s Richwhite was consistently listed as one of New Zealand's wealthiest businessmen with an estimated personal wealth of NZD$660 million. He now co-owns Great Mercury Island with business partner Sir Michael Fay.

=== The Winebox Inquiry: Commission of Inquiry into Certain Matters relating to Taxation ===
In 1994, a Commission of Inquiry was undertaken in New Zealand to investigate claims of corruption and incompetence in two government entities: the Serious Fraud Office (SFO) and Inland Revenue Department (IRD). The inquiry centred on a transaction carried out between a subsidiary of European Pacific Investments (EPI), a company directed by Richwhite and three others, and the Cook Islands Government.

In September 1986, European Pacific Investments was incorporated. One of its directors, David Lloyd, was responsible for convincing the Cook Islands Government to establish a tax haven. EPI's subsidiary company, Magnum, paid the Cook Islands Government NZD$2 million and received a tax certificate which was presented to the tax office in New Zealand. Once presented, EPI received a rebate of the same amount (NZD$2 million). The net effect of the transaction was that the EPI group effectively paid the Cook Islands Government NZD$50,000 but received a New Zealand tax credit of NZD$2 million.

The transaction at the centre of the inquiry was named the "Magnum" transaction after the EPI company involved.

The subsequent inquiry was spearheaded by politician Winston Peters and is commonly referred to as the "Winebox Inquiry" in reference to Winston Peters' delivery of the documents central to the allegations to Parliament in a winebox.

Although the Commission concluded that there was no fraud or incompetence, controversy surrounded the ruling. Changes to the New Zealand tax laws relating to the claiming of foreign tax credits were made and new rules relating to disclosure to the Inland Revenue Department and penalties for non-compliance were introduced.

=== Securities Commission case ===
In June 2007, Richwhite and Midavia Rail Investments, a company he co-owned with Michael Fay, were investigated by Securities Commission of New Zealand for accusations of insider trading relating to Tranz Rail. Richwhite and Fay settled with the Commission out of court for NZD$20million without admission of liability.

Their joint statement read: "While they consider the settlement amount does not properly reflect the lack of merit in the Commission’s proceedings, the settlement payment is only a little over half the amount claimed by the Commission, including interests and costs. It is less than 1/5 of the Commission’s maximum claim at the time it commenced proceedings. It is also at a proportionately lower level than the settlements the Commission reached with all the other defendants. Importantly, it is also reached without any admission of liability. The fact that the Commission was prepared to settle for substantially less than the full claim and without any admission of liability no doubt reflects the Commission’s recognition that it faced a risk of losing if the claim went to trial".

== America’s Cup and other sporting interests ==
Sir Michael Fay and David Richwhite backed and led the first three New Zealand challenges for the coveted America's Cup sailing trophy in 1987, 1988, 1992. They personally invested over $100 million toward the cause.

Following the 1988 "Big Boat" challenge they briefly won the cup, later losing it in the courts to San Diego Yacht Club. New Zealand went on to win the trophy in 1995, a campaign in which Fay and Richwite were not involved.

In 1988, the pair led a team to San Francisco for the World One Ton Cup which they won in Bruce Farr designed "Propaganda" (KZ 6161).

Fay and Richwhite also funded the Manu Samoa Rugby Team for several years following the team running into financial difficulty. The ownership and control of the team has now been handed back to the Samoa Rugby Union.

== Philanthropy ==
Richwhite has been active in his support for and participation in numerous not-for-profit, cultural and community initiatives, including:

- Being a benefactor of the "Play it Strange" Trust for which the David Richwhite Lyric Award was created
- Sponsoring a new high-performance rowing centre at University of Otago
- Founding and sponsoring the Fay Richwhite Corporate triathlon series in New Zealand and Australia
- Patronising New Zealand's exhibition at the Venice Biennale in 2009
- Formerly acting as Chair of the Ellerslie Flower Show
- Gifting a KZ1 (yacht) to the Auckland Maritime Museum
- Donating to Women's Refuge, the Salvation Army, Starship Hospital and Westpac Rescue Helicopter.

== Great Mercury Island ==
In 1978, Fay and Richwhite purchased Great Mercury Island, which lies eight kilometres off the east coast of the Coromandel Peninsula. The island's northern half is primarily farmland which supports both sheep and beef farming operations. Its southern half has been re-vegetated with pine and native trees. Richwhite's wife Libby has overseen the planting of over 600,000 native trees on the island as well as a conservation programme to preserve many of the island's rich historic and archaeologically significant Māori pā and heritage sites.

Groups helping children at risk are often invited to make use of the island's facilities for their camps. Given the island's isolation, land has also made available for a team of scientists breeding a strain of bee immune to the destructive Varroa mite infestation currently affecting the worldwide bee industry.

On 30 November 2009, Great Mercury Island hosted the first successful launch of Rocket Lab's suborbital Atea-1 sounding rocket.

== Other activities ==
David Richwhite has four children and is an active fisherman, hunter and musician. His son Christopher was detained in Iran in 2022.
