= Sarah Paiji Yoo =

American entrepreneur (born 1984)

- Born: Sarah Paiji; 1984 (age 41–42); Cerritos, California, U.S.
- Education: Harvard University (AB, MBA)
- Occupations: Entrepreneur; business executive
- Years active: 2011-present
- Known for: Co-founder and CEO of Blueland; Co-founder and former CEO of Snapette
- Children: 2

Sarah Paiji Yoo (born 1984) is an American entrepreneur who is the co-founder and CEO of Blueland, a company that offers cleaning and personal care products. She also founded and served as CEO of Snapette from 2011 to 2013.

== Early life and education ==
Yoo was born in 1984, in Cerritos, California, to Myung Paiji and Sam Paiji. Yoo attended Harvard University She graduated magna cum laude in 2006 with a Bachelor of Arts in economics. In 2010, Yoo attended the Harvard Business School, which she left after her first year to pursue Snapette.

== Career ==
Yoo began a career in finance in 2005, working various roles at McKinsey & Company, Goldman Sachs, and Berkshire Partners until 2010. Yoo founded her first company Snapette, a platform for fashion shopping, in 2011. Snapette was acquired by PriceGrabber in 2013. In 2014, Yoo founded LAUNCH, a startup accelerator. As a partner, she helped launch various fashion and beauty companies.

=== Blueland ===
In 2018, after reaching out to Syed Naqvi, a director at the cleaning product brand Method, Yoo co-founded Blueland with John Mascari in 2019. Naqvi became the first employee at the company and currently serves as chief innovation officer. Blueland was featured on Shark Tank in 2020, securing a fundraising deal with Kevin O'Leary.

By 2022, Blueland, with over US$100 million in sales, had raised $35 million in venture funding.

== Personal life ==
Yoo married Kenneth Yoo in 2015. They have two sons. Yoo is of Korean descent.
