= San Luis Central Railroad =

Railroad in Colorado, United States

Overview
- Headquarters: Monte Vista, Colorado
- Reporting mark: SLC
- Locale: Colorado
- Dates of operation: 1913–2024
- Successor: Colorado Pacific San Luis Railroad

Technical
- Length: 13 miles (21 km)

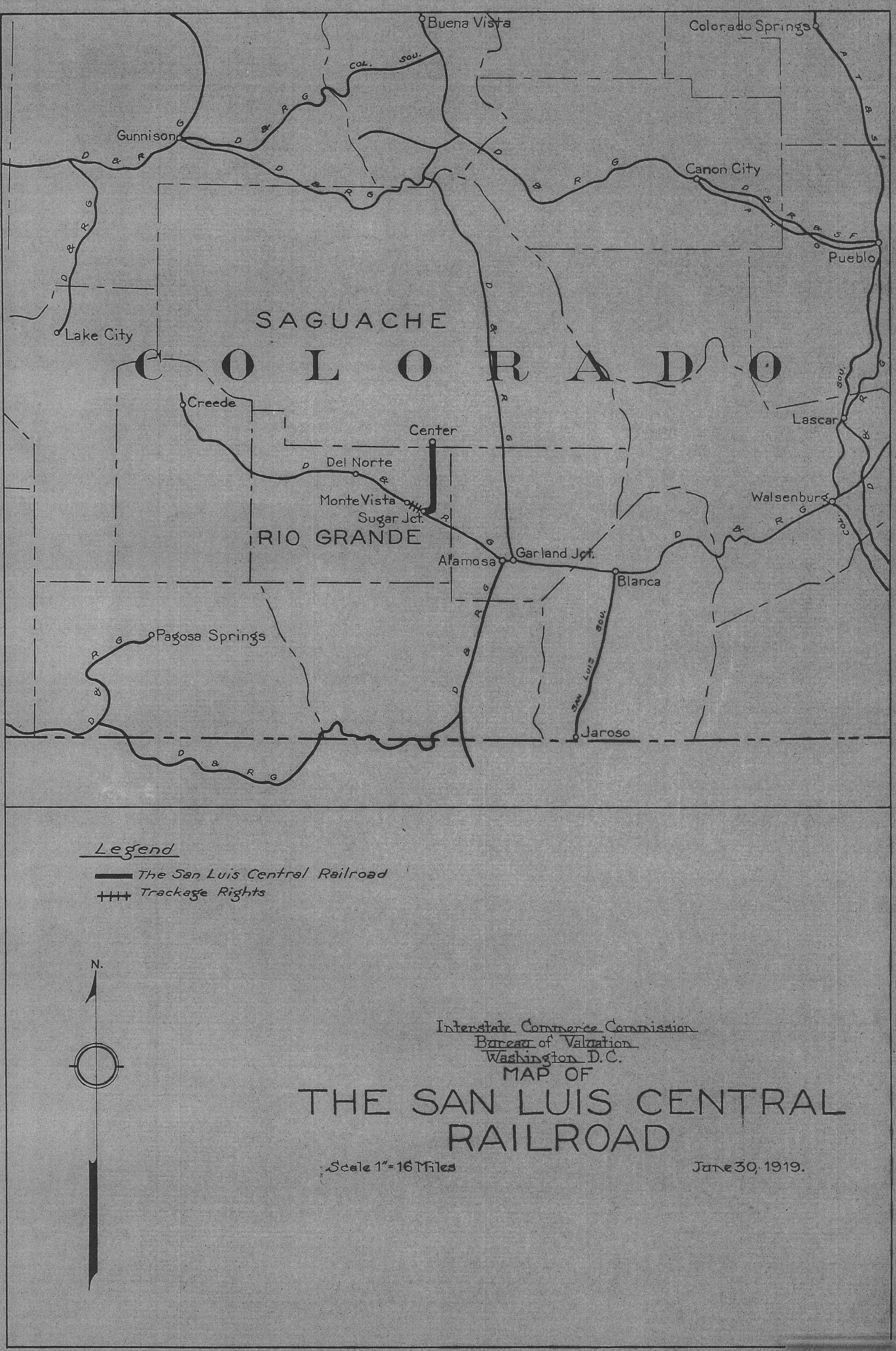
1919 map of the railroad

The San Luis Central Railroad (reporting mark SLC) was a railroad company based in the U.S. state of Colorado.

The San Luis Central Railroad (reporting mark SLC), was founded in 1913 to haul sugar beets from grower to processor. The railroad operated freight traffic through a connection with the Denver & Rio Grande Western, and later its successor, the Colorado Pacific Rio Grande Railroad. Hauling mainly grain, potatoes and fertilizer, SLC was also a railcar owner, of mostly refrigerator cars and boxcars. On August 23rd, 2024, a filing with the Surface Transportation Board revealed that the Soloviev Group, which owned the Colorado Pacific Rio Grande, would be purchasing the San Luis Central, which would then be renamed to the Colorado Pacific San Luis Railroad.

The railroad was 13 miles (21 km) long, located between Sugar Junction (east of Monte Vista, Colorado) and Center, Colorado. At the time of sale in 2024, the railroad owned two locomotives: Electro Motive Division SW8 number 70 and General Electric 70 ton locomotive number 71. Prior to its purchase by Colorado Pacific San Luis, the company was owned by Rail World, Inc., which is controlled by Ed Burkhardt.
