= Michael Fay (banker) =

New Zealand merchant banker

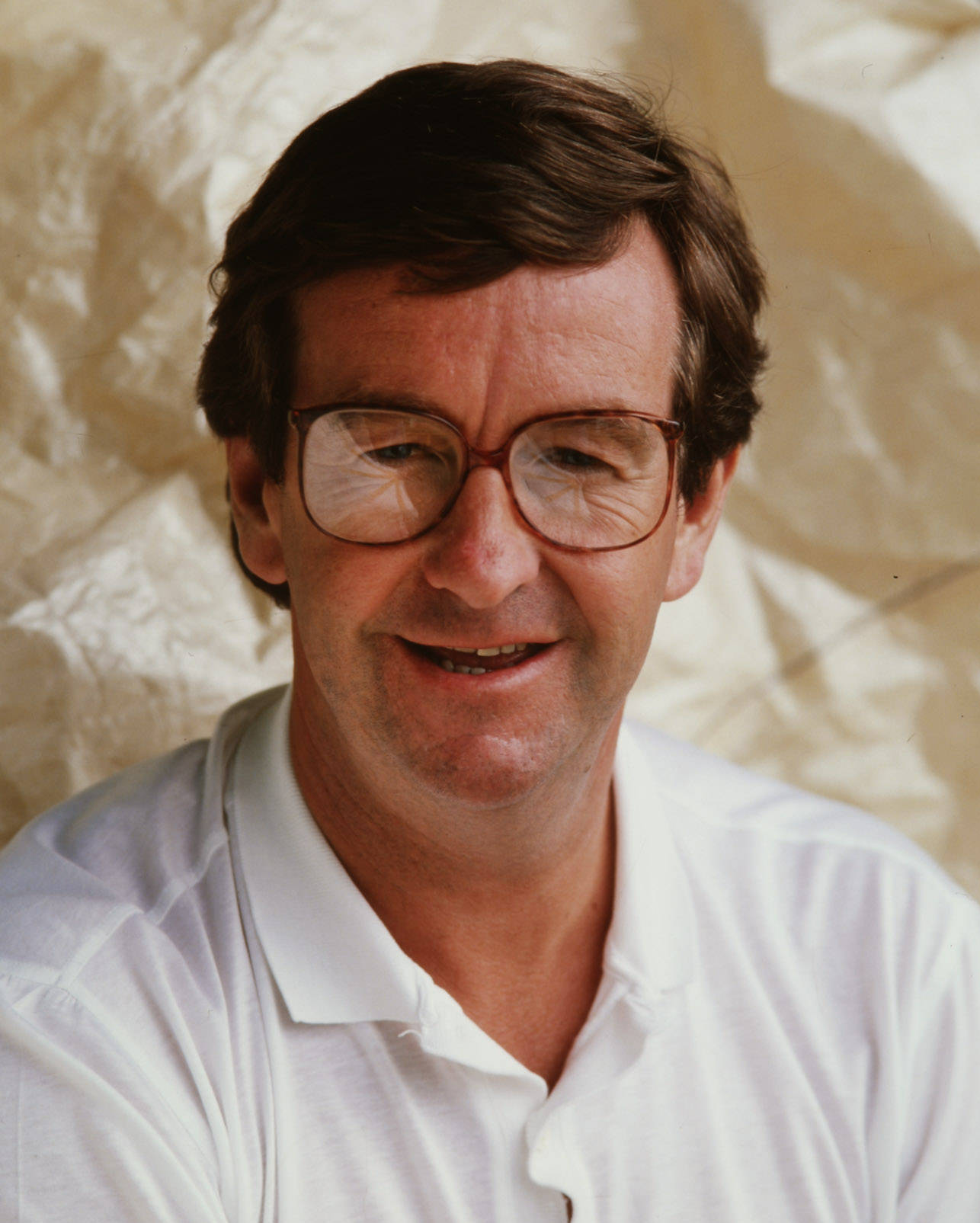
Fay during the 1980s

Sir Humphrey Michael Gerard Fay (born 10 April 1949) is a New Zealand merchant banker and partner in the merchant bank Fay Richwhite. He is one of the ten richest men in New Zealand. His personal wealth was largely acquired during the late 1980s and early 1990s, which included the period in which he had a significant role in the structural adjustment of the New Zealand economy undertaken by New Zealand's Fourth Labour Government. He is thought to be worth in excess of NZD 920 million, making him the 10th richest New Zealand citizen in 2017.

== Early life and family ==
Fay was born in Auckland on 10 April 1949. He was educated at St Peter's College, Auckland and St Patrick's College, Silverstream, and studied law at Victoria University of Wellington, graduating LLB in 1971. In 1983, he married Sarah Ann Williams, and the couple went on to have three children.

== Fay Richwhite ==
Michael Fay and David Richwhite are best known for gaining wealth in a series of loosely regulated privatisation and asset swapping transactions that occurred between 1986 and 1993 – involving their companies European Pacific, Capital Markets and Fay Richwhite and the former state owned operations Bank of New Zealand, Tranz Rail and Telecom New Zealand, and the pension accounts associated to them.

One notable transaction among these actions was their role as advisors to the government on the sale of New Zealand Rail Limited to overseas interests; a deal in which Fay and Richwhite later bought 31.8 per cent of the shares, and were subsequently investigated for insider trading by New Zealand authorities.

=== Securities Commission case ===
In October 2004 the New Zealand Securities Commission accused Richwhite and Midavia Rail Investments, a company owned by Richwhite and Fay, of insider trading. Richwhite was alleged to have tipped off Midavia to sell $63 million worth of Tranz Rail shares, whilst knowing Tranz Rail faced financial problems undisclosed to the public. In June 2007, Midavia paid $20 million to settle insider trading proceedings relating to Tranz Rail. The commission stated that the payments had been made "without any admission of liability". The settlement is the largest of its kind ever seen in Australasia.

== America's Cup ==
Fay backed New Zealand's first America's Cup campaign in 1987, which won through to the challenger's final before losing to a US entry from San Diego.

In 1988 Fay backed a challenge to San Diego Yacht Club, who had just won the America's Cup. Rather than wait three to four years and join a general international challenge as had been the custom for thirty-five years, he had his legal team review the original Deed of Gift. The Deed of Gift was the document drawn up by the owners of the 100 Guineas Cup, won by the yacht America, to offer the cup for international competition. The deed did not specify a time delay between challenges, nor were competitors limited to compete in a particular class of boat, nor did boats have to be the same size or class. Fay financed the creation of KZ 1, a large single-hull yacht which complied with the original Deed of Gift but was much larger and hence faster than the 12-metre class boats which had been used for America's Cup competition for many years. Dennis Conner, skipper of the American defender, responded by building the multihull Stars & Stripes (US-1). Court actions followed which, after initially ruling a mismatch and requiring forfeiture, decided that both boats complied with the original Deed of Gift. Fay sailed on the boat during the 1988 America's Cup. The Stars & Stripes catamaran easily won. The bad press generated by Fay's heavily litigious approach to yacht racing heralded an era of better management and agreement for future challenges.

In the 1990 Queen's Birthday Honours, Fay was appointed as a Knight Bachelor, for services to merchant banking and yachting.

Fay was inducted into the America's Cup Hall of Fame in 2002.

== Sport and domicile ==
Fay is also the chairman of and was the financial backer of the Samoa national rugby union team. Fay now resides in New Zealand and, with David Richwhite, owns Great Mercury Island. They have spent $750,000, matching the same amount contributed by the Department of Conservation, to make the island (which is open to the public) pest-free, in a programme beginning in 2014.

== See also ==
- For some more biographical details: List of alumni of St Peter's College, Auckland
