= Snapette =

- Founded: Palo Alto, California (2011)
- Headquarters: Palo Alto; New York City
- Key people: Jinhee Ahn Kim; Sarah Paiji Yoo
- Website: Official website

Snapette is a location-based shopping mobile application and website that acts as a digital resource for shoppers, enabling users to find nearby stores, products, and exclusive offers. Snapette was founded in 2011 by Jinhee Ahn Kim and Sarah Paiji Yoo and has partnerships with stores in California, New York City, and London.

== History ==
Snapette launched in January 2011 and was co-founded by Harvard alumni Sarah Paiji and Jinhee Kim. The company completed the prestigious 500 Startups accelerator program in Silicon Valley, founded by Dave McClure, and has raised $1.5 million in funding from top investors including Accel Partners, Forerunner Ventures and ShoeDazzle founder Brian Lee.

Prior to Snapette, Paiji worked at firms Goldman Sachs, McKinsey & Co. and Berkshire Partners advising retail and tech companies. Kim attended Parsons in New York and has designed for Liz Claiborne and Ralph Lauren.

Snapette is based in New York City with nine full-time employees.

Snapette was acquired by PriceGrabber in 2013.

== Mobile application ==
As a mobile application, users can upload photos of their fashion finds or browse images uploaded by other users. Users can snap a photo on Snapette and upload it with brand, price, and location

== Press ==
Snapette has been featured and mentioned in several online news sources and publications. Rachel Strugatz from Women's Wear Daily reported in an article about the digital world’s role in driving foot traffic back in stores, which is exemplified by Snapette. In another press release, Kit Eaton from Fast Company revealed specific features on the app that make Snapette the ideal “discovery agent.” WABC also commented on the app’s ability to help you “shop and save” on the mobile phone, while Racked NY reported on how users can “stay connected to their favorite stores” by following boutiques, viewing new products, and getting access to exclusive deals from participating stores.

Snapette was also featured on Apple's iTunes Store as “What’s Hot”, “What’s New and Noteworthy” and as “Staff Favorites.” Version 2.0 of the app, released in June 2012, "redefines the shopping experience," according to PR Newswire. 2.0 is also available on Android phones. International Business Times listed Snapette as one of the "Top 10 Must-Have Fashion Apps."

== Funding ==
Snapette is funded by leading Silicon Valley venture capital firms and strategic angels including Brian Lee the Founder/CEO of Shoedazzle. On October 12, 2011, the company raised $1.3 million in seed funding and with the completion of Dave McClure’s 500 startups accelerator program raised $1.5 million to date.
