= Tranz Rail =

Former rail operator in New Zealand

Tranz Rail Holdings Ltd
- Type: State-owned enterprise (1991—1993); Private Company (1993—1995); Public company (1995—2003)
- Industry: Rail transport in New Zealand
- Predecessor: New Zealand Railways Corporation (as railway operator and owner)
- Founded: 20 December 1991 (as New Zealand Rail Limited)
- Defunct: 7 July 2003
- Fate: Taken over by Toll Holdings
- Successor: Toll NZ (as railway operator) ONTRACK (as railway owner)
- Headquarters: Wellington, New Zealand
- Area served: New Zealand
- Key people: Chairman: Edward Burkhardt (1993—1999); CEO: Dr Francis Small (1991—2000); Michael Beard (2000—2003); CFO: Ronald Russ (1993—1999); Mark Bloomer (1999—2003)
- Services: Freight (rail and trucking) long-distance passenger rail urban passenger rail inter-island ferries
- Parent: Fay, Richwhite & Company; Wisconsin Central (Canadian National Railway); Berkshire Partners
- Divisions: Tranz Scenic; Tranz Metro; Tranz Link the Interisland Line

Tranz Rail, formally Tranz Rail Holdings Limited (New Zealand Rail Limited until October 1995), was the main rail operator in New Zealand from 1991 until it was purchased by Toll Holdings in June 2003.

== History ==
The New Zealand railway network was initially built by provincial governments, starting with the Ferrymead Railway in 1863. From 1880, a central Government department, the New Zealand Railways Department, was responsible for operating most of the growing railway network. A few private lines were built, but only one, the Wellington and Manawatu Railway Company (W&MR) achieved any measure of success. The W&MR was nationalised in 1908. In 1931, due to increasing competition from road carriers, the Transport Licensing Act 1931 was passed, restricting road cartage and giving the railways department a monopoly on long-distance freight. In 1982, the same year the land transport sector was deregulated, the Railways Department was reconstituted as the New Zealand Railways Corporation, a statutory corporation (later a state-owned enterprise from 1986). The Railways Corporation restructured the operations of the railway network substantially during the 1980s, reducing staffing levels, closing workshops, and introducing a number of measures to increase productivity, such as removing guard's vans, increasing train lengths and introducing new, heavier bulk bogie wagons.

=== Formation ===
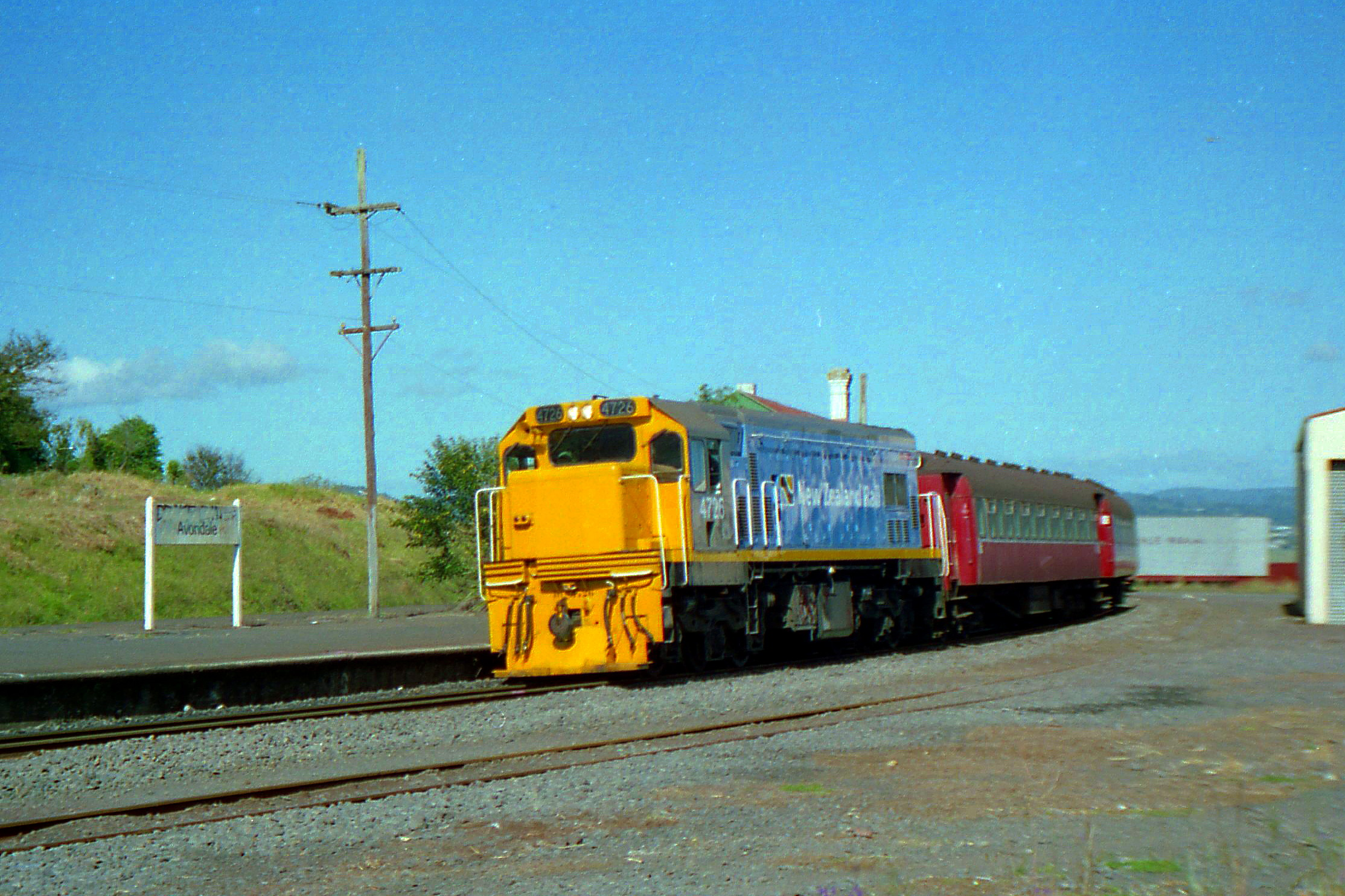
DC4726 in New Zealand Rail livery at Avondale in the 1990s

The Fourth Labour Government passed the New Zealand Railways Corporation Restructuring Act 1990 on 28 August of that year. Two months later, on 28 October 1990, the New Zealand government removed core rail transport and shipping operations from the New Zealand Railways Corporation, creating a separate entity called New Zealand Rail Limited, a Crown Transferee company created under the Act. At the same time, the Rail Heritage Trust of New Zealand was formed to protect heritage assets that New Zealand Rail planned to dispose of, especially heritage rolling stock, stations and other equipment.

The government wrote off NZ$1.08 billion in debt acquired by the company from the Railways Corporation (mainly for the electrification of the North Island Main Trunk, a Think Big project), and injected a further $300 million in capital. Fay, Richwhite and Company, financial advisers to New Zealand Rail, argued the company had a better future with minimal debt.

Despite this capital injection, the company remained only marginally profitable, reporting after-tax profits of $36.2 million in 1992 and $18 million in 1993. The Railways Corporation retained ownership of the land beneath the railway tracks and yards, which New Zealand Rail paid $1 per year to lease.

New Zealand Rail re-branded, introducing a new logo similar to the Railways Corporation but with blue and yellow as colours instead of red and black, and a blue livery on locomotives, rolling stock and buildings.

=== Privatisation ===
The Bolger National government, elected following the defeat of the fourth Labour government in elections held in October 1990, privatised New Zealand Rail Limited in 1993. The New Zealand Treasury supported privatisation of the company, even though it stated Fay Richwhite had an unfair advantage over other bidders. Business journalist Brian Gaynor noted that New Zealand Rail was an attractive investment because of its strong balance sheet.

Six consortiums made bids to buy New Zealand Rail Limited:

- Freightways and the Noel Group: Freightways is a major New Zealand freight operator, Noel Group was a US-based investment company with investments in railways in the United States.
- Fay Richwhite and Wisconsin Central: consortium made up of Fay Richwhite (31.8% via the investment company Pacific Rail, later renamed Midavia Rail), the American railroad Wisconsin Central (27.3%), Berkshire Partners (27.3%), Alex van Heeren, the owner of Huka Lodge, 9.1% and Richwhite family interests, 4.5%.
- Sea Containers, Anschutz Corporation: Sea Containers was particularly interested in the ferry business, and the rail operations as well. Anschutz owned Southern Pacific and the Denver & Rio Grande railways in the US (both later acquired by Union Pacific).
- Mainfreight, Brierley Investments and Railroad Development Corporation: Mainfreight is a major NZ Rail customer, but Brierleys was seen as having an interest as it was a part shareholder of the Union Shipping Group. RDC was a minor owner of railroads in the US and Argentina.
- Port of Tauranga and Port of Lyttelton, Pacifica Shipping, National Mutual and AMP Limited: At the time Port of Tauranga took 25% of rail freight, and Lyttelton was important for coal traffic. Pacifica saw the acquisition complementing its coastal shipping operation, and the insurance and investment firms were there for the later stock float.
- Ports of Auckland and Ports of Wellington, Sofrana-Unilines and Stagecoach: Mirroring Port of Tauranga for competition, Auckland saw the investment as strategic. Wellington saw NZ Rail as its biggest customer with the Interislander. Stagecoach was seen as wanting to complement its bus business in Wellington. Sofrana was a French shipping line.

The company was sold to the Fay Richwhite-Wisconsin Central consortium for $328.3 million through an entity named Pylorus Investments Limited, shortly afterwards renamed Tranz Rail Limited. The sale was completed on 30 September 1993. Tranz Rail Limited raised funds to buy New Zealand Rail by borrowing $223.3 million, and its shareholders contributed $105 million to the acquisition price through the purchase of 105 million Tranz Rail shares at $1 each.

Commentators welcomed the presence of an "experienced American short-line operator" (Wisconsin Central) but were critical of Fay Richwhite, arguing that as a private equity firm the company was only interested in "short-term capital profit maximisation."

In 1994 the company sold its 15% stake in Clear Communications for $72.6 million, $20.1 million above book value. The company had gained its shareholding by selling its fibre optic network along the North Island Main Trunk to Clear.

Tranz Rail won the Roger Award for The Worst Transnational Corporation operating in New Zealand on three occasions: 2000, 2001 and 2002, and was the first corporation inducted into the "hall of shame".

=== Rebranded Tranz Rail ===
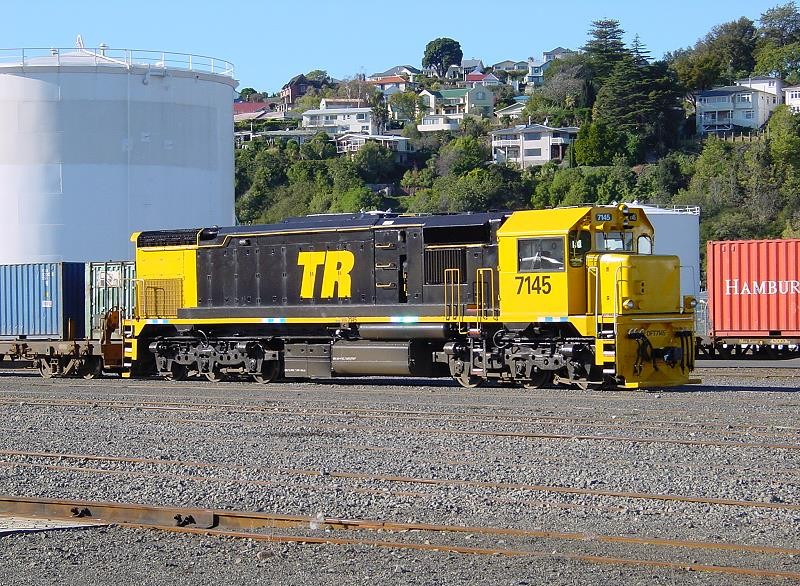
DFT 7145 in Napier in Tranz Rail's bumble bee livery, in use June 2001–2004.

New Zealand Rail carried its corporate brand until 18 October 1995, when Tranz Rail Limited was renamed Tranz Rail Holdings Limited and New Zealand Rail Limited was renamed Tranz Rail. On the same day Tranz Rail Holdings Limited made a $100 million capital repayment to the Fay Richwhite consortium, largely financed by the sale of shares in Clear Communications. The Tranz Rail brand was created by Wellington-based Cato Partners, who also designed brands for the divisions of Tranz Rail:

- CityRail, urban rail commuter services in Auckland and Wellington, were renamed Tranz Metro
- InterCity Rail, long-distance rail passenger services were renamed Tranz Scenic
- RailFreight, rail freight services were renamed Tranz Link

The livery that resulted was nicknamed Cato blue by rail fans.

==== Initial Public Offering ====
Tranz Rail listed on 14 June 1996 on the New Zealand Sharemarket and NASDAQ. 31 million new shares, equivalent to 25% of the company, were issued to the public at $6.19. At the time of the Initial Public Offering (IPO), Tranz Rail had term loans debt of $300 million.

The share price reached $9.00 in the middle of 1997. Some of the original Tranz Rail shareholders took advantage of the high share price to sell down their shares in the company. Berkshire Fund sold most of its shares at more than $8 each between November 1996 and March 1997. In 1998, Alex van Heeren sold his holding for a profit of more than $42 million, and the next year Fay Richwhite sold 6.2 million shares at an average $3.67 a share. On 8 February 2002, Fay Richwhite sold 17.6 million shares at $3.60 a share and Berkshire Fund sold 4.3 million shares on 12 February that year at the same price. The original investors made a $360 million profit from their investment.

=== New services ===
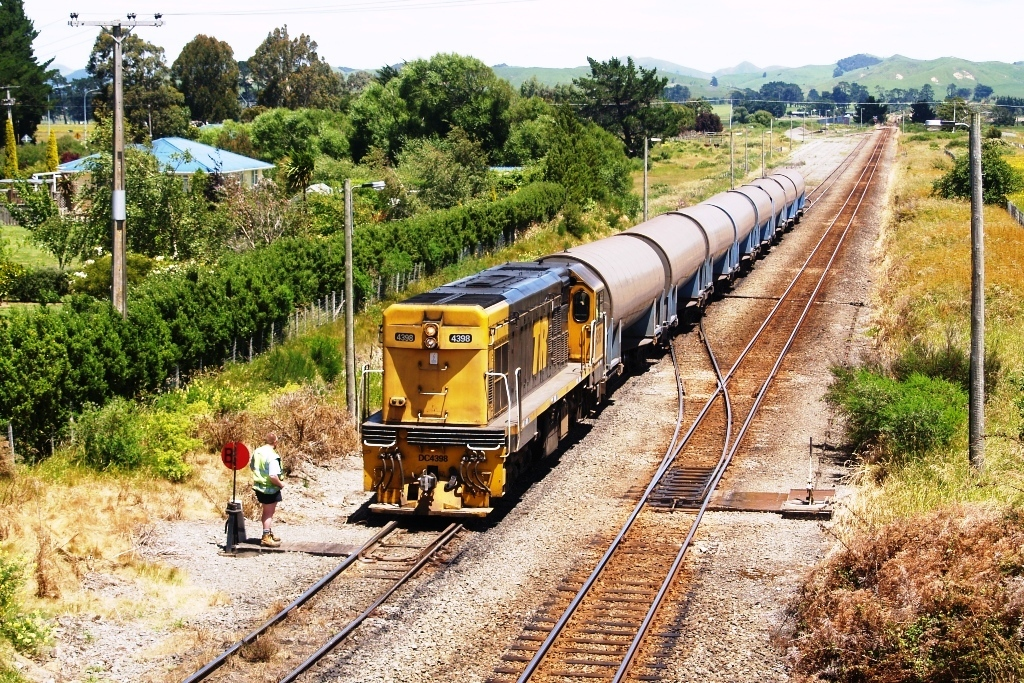
Tranz Rail introduced bulk milk trains during the late 1990s. Here a DC class locomotive shunts OM class milk wagons at Oringi on 11 December 2008.

Tranz Rail introduced bulk milk trains in August 1997, from Oringi and Longburn to Whareroa dairy factory near Hawera. Initial trains consisted of 16 bulk milk wagons, carrying a total of 800,000 litres of milk.

In 1999, Port of Tauranga and Tranz Rail launched MetroPort, a new service using fixed-consist container trains between the Tauranga container terminal and Southdown freight terminal in Auckland. The success of this service prompted Ports of Auckland to initiate a similar service, initially proposed to run from Auckland's container terminal as far south as Palmerston North, with a new "South Auckland Freight Hub" at Wiri. The freight hub has become the ultimate terminal of the Ports of Auckland service.

In 2000, Tranz Rail introduced "Shuttle Train Service", speeding up services to smooth out peaks in traffic. At the same time, four-wheel wagons were banned from mainline services, on account of speed restrictions the wagons created.

=== Maritime deregulation and Asian financial crisis ===
New Zealand's maritime sector was further deregulated in 1994 by the Maritime Transport Act 1994, which abolished of cabotage, allowing international vessels operated by overseas shipping companies to carry New Zealand freight between ports in New Zealand. This further increased competition for Tranz Rail's services, especially for bulk containers.

The 1997 Asian financial crisis further undermined Tranz Rail's profitability, as the New Zealand economy stagnated and unemployment rose sharply. A decline in Tranz Rail's performance, as well as other investments by Wisconsin Central, led to a change in leadership at the company.

=== Tasrail investment ===
In partnership with Wisconsin Central as the Australian Transport Network, Tranz Rail invested in Tasmanian rail operator Tasrail in 1997. From August 1998, Tranz Rail sold twelve members of its DQ class and three QR class locomotives to Tasrail. The locomotives were rebuilt at the Hutt Workshops. The DQ locomotives were originally imported by New Zealand Rail in September 1995 from Queensland Rail as an alternative to buying new locomotives. In service, they proved unpopular with locomotive crews due to excessive vibration and noise in their cabs.

The investment provided only marginal returns, and Toll later sold the TasRail shareholding to Pacific National, a Toll Holdings partnership with Patrick Corporation, in 2003.

=== Interisland ferries and competition ===
From the 1990s to 2000s, New Zealand Rail's (and later Tranz Rail) Interislander ferry services between the North and South Islands faced increasing competition.

In 1992, Strait Shipping launched its own freight-only ferry service between Wellington and Picton. For the first time since the withdrawal of the Union Steam Ship Co. TEV Rangatira in 1976, an alternative to the rail ferry passenger service was launched by Sea Shuttle in late 1994.

In response, New Zealand Rail leased a high-speed catamaran from Incat, Condor 10, for its "Lynx" service, along with a short-lived connecting rail passenger service the Lynx Express. Initially, the Lynx high-speed ferry service was summer-only, but from 1999 this service became year-round, when another competitor TopCat introduced its own high-speed service. The catamarans substantially reduced travel time between islands from 3 hours by conventional ferry to 1 hour 45 minutes. Environmental concerns, as well as damage to small boats in Picton harbour, led the Marlborough District Council to impose a speed restriction on all high-speed catamarans from May 1999, which added an additional 30 minutes to the schedule.

TopCat subsequently went into receivership in November 2000, with Tranz Rail buying its high-speed ferry (Incat 046) for its own Lynx service. With further speed restrictions reducing the time between conventional ferries and high-speed ferries to 45 minutes, Tranz Rail withdrew the Lynx service in 2003. The Lynx ceased operation in 2003.

Strait Shipping launched its own passenger ferry service in 2002 under the Bluebridge brand, further increasing competition with Tranz Rail.

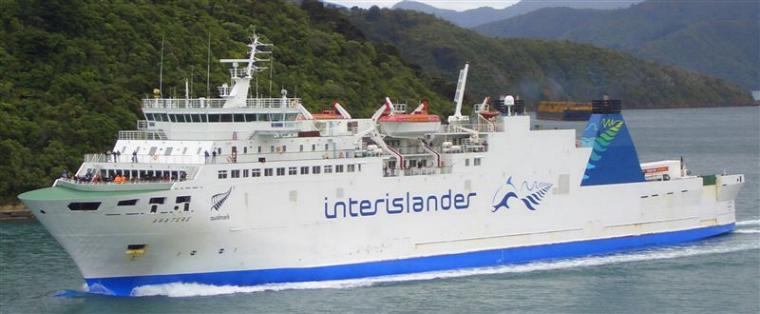
Tranz Rail introduced the ferry Aratere in 1999.

Tranz Rail ordered the sixth inter-island rail and road ferry, Aratere, in 1997, from shipbuilder Hijos de J. Barreras in Vigo, Spain. The Aratere replaced the Aratika, which was sold to a Philippines shipping company, in February 1999. The Aratere had more than the usual teething issues when introduced, and was withdrawn for repairs frequently in the early 2000s, causing many travel disruptions. Tranz Rail financed the purchase of the Aratere using a lease-back agreement, whereby a third-party leased the vessel to Tranz Rail, which had the option of buying out the lease at a future date, which Tranz Rail did in October 2003.

In 1996, Tranz Rail had begun resource consent applications for a new ferry terminal at Clifford Bay in the Marlborough Sounds, to replace Picton. This terminal would greatly shorten travel times between the North and South Islands, and with the introduction of high-speed ferries, protect the environment in the Marlborough Sounds. The application under the Resource Management Act 1991 took many years and appeals to progress, with approval finally being granted on 16 November 1999. Construction of the new terminal did not progress, due to changes in management at Tranz Rail.

=== Asset sales and Beard era ===
In December 1996, Tranz Rail sold the DFT class of locomotives to the Chicago Freight Car Leasing Company for $131.5 million. It then leased the locomotives back for a period of 12 years. The lease ended on 19 December 2008 with the locomotives ownership returning to Tranz Rail's successor, KiwiRail.

Tranz Rail's chairman Ed Burkhardt resigned in August 1999 as a result of resigning as the chairman, CEO and president of Wisconsin Central in July 1999. Industry insiders put this down to his preference to reinvest revenues rather than pay dividends to shareholders. Wisconsin Central's new board sold Wisconsin Central to the Canadian National Railway on 9 October 2001. Canadian National then put its 24% shareholding in Tranz Rail up for sale.

Michael Beard was appointed CEO of Tranz Rail in 2000 following the retirement of Dr Francis Small, who had led the organisation from its SOE days into its first phase of privatisation. Beard's policy was to focus on the rail freight operation, and sell any assets which were not core to this business, such as long-distance passenger trains (Tranz Scenic) and commuter services in Wellington and Auckland (Tranz Metro), as well as the rail network itself.

Tranz Rail also contracted out services which were previously provided in-house. Alstom was contracted for locomotive servicing and took over the Hutt Workshops, while Transfield Services took over track maintenance.

Beard also moved Tranz Rail's headquarters from the Wellington railway station to a new purpose-built office on the North Shore of Auckland, at a cost of $16 million. In 2000, a ministerial inquiry was formed to look into Tranz Rail's safety record, due to an unusually high number of work-related fatalities over the previous 12 months.

In June 2001, Tranz Rail sold 50% of Tranz Scenic to two directors of the Victoria, Australia rail operator West Coast Railway for $33 million. This sale included long-distance passenger rolling stock and ten diesel locomotives of the DC class, reclassified as the DCP class, and two EF class electric locomotives. In 2004, this share was purchased by Toll NZ, as one of the West Coast Railway directors had died and the business was not performing adequately.

On 24 December 2001, Tranz Rail sold the Auckland suburban rail network to the New Zealand Government for $81 million. In 2003 a competitive tender was held to find a new operator for the suburban passenger services, which Tranz Rail did not bid for. Connex (later renamed Transdev Auckland) won the contract and took over Tranz Metro's Auckland operation from 23 August 2004.

=== Intermodal Transformation Project ===
Beard introduced a "mode neutral" policy, as part of his "Intermodal Transformation Project". The project emphasised containerised freight over "marginal" freight, which Tranz Rail stopped carrying by rail. This led to accusations that Tranz Rail was intentionally moving freight off rail and onto roads. One of the reasons cited by Tranz Rail for these policies was that the cost of using road transport to the company was less than that of using rail, because the road infrastructure is provided as a public good. In contrast, the rail network was a private good.

=== Toll takeover ===
In May 2002, Tranz Rail was delisted from the NASDAQ, as 70% of its shares were owned by New Zealanders and 16% Australians.

In May 2003, United States-based RailAmerica made a 75c-per-share takeover offer for Tranz Rail. The offer was later withdrawn when the share price dropped below 50c. At the same time, the Australian transport firm Toll Holdings purchased a 6.1% share of Tranz Rail, increasing its share to 10.1% by June and 19.9% in July. Toll then launched its own takeover bid, initially offering 75c per share, later increased to 95c.

In June 2003, the Government it had reached a Heads of Agreement with Tranz Rail, announcing that it would buy back the rail network for $1 and purchase a 35% stake in the firm for $76 million (67c per share), which would have given it effective control of the company. The Government would have had the right to nominate three of the seven directors on the board. This met with approval from the Rail & Maritime Transport Union (RMTU), which had run a vigorous "Take Back The Track" campaign for the government to renationalise the railway network. The Rail Freight Action Group, which represents the interests of some of the biggest rail freight-using companies, declared its support. Tranz Scenic, by then a separate company from Tranz Rail, did likewise.

In July 2003, the Government announced that it was dropping its bid to buy a 35% stake in Tranz Rail, instead allowing Toll to succeed in its takeover bid. Toll's bid valued Tranz Rail at $231 million. The Government reached a new Heads of Agreement with Toll later that month, and eventually bought the rail network for $1, plus $50 million for property assets, including leases and Wellington railway station. The deal also established a performance regime creating incentives for Toll if it shifted freight from road to rail, and penalties if freight carriage falls below 70% of 2003 levels. If Toll increased freight volumes by 10% or more on certain lines, the Government would have granted it a track access charge holiday. The parties agreed the Government would spend $200 million over the next five years upgrading the track via the New Zealand Railways Corporation, operating as ONTRACK (then known as TrackCo).

Toll did not achieve the 90% stake of Tranz Rail it required to meet the Government's deal and compulsorily acquire the remaining 10% of shares, despite raising its offer again to $1.10 per share. In 2003, around 3,000 small shareholders held 25% of Tranz Rail's shares, many of them major institutional shareholders such as AMI and Infratil. After a number of extensions of the deadline set by Toll, it held 84.2% of shares in Tranz Rail after the offer closed in December 2003. By that time, shares were being sold on the New Zealand Sharemarket for $1.65, above even the independent valuation of between $1.34 and $1.62 made in July by merchant bankers Grant Samuel. Despite Toll not achieving the 90% requirement, the Government honoured the Heads of Agreement made in July 2003.

In February 2004, Tranz Rail reported a $346 million loss for the half-year ended December 2003. In the same year, it carried 2.1 million tonnes of coal on the Midland line in the South Island. The departure of the chief executive officer, Michael Beard, and six other top managers cost it $6 million in exit payments.

Toll and the Government finalised their deal on 1 July 2004. The company was renamed Toll NZ and did not retain any of the Tranz Rail directors.

In May 2008, the New Zealand Government agreed to buy the rail and sea transport assets of Toll NZ Limited for $665 million. The government branded the new company KiwiRail.

== Performance ==
The total number of tonnes transported by New Zealand Rail and Tranz Rail from 1995 increased between 1993 and 2003, peaking in 2000.

Rail freight volumes 1993 – 2003 (year ending 30 June):

Year	Tonnes (000s)	Net tonne-km (millions)	Average length of haul (km)
1993	8,514	2,468	290
1994	9,444	2,835	300
1995	9,584	3,202	334
1996	10,305	3,260	316
1997	11,525	3,505	304
1998	11,706	3,547	303
1999	12,900	3,671	285
2000	14,699	4,078	277
2001	14,461	3,942	273
2002	14,330	3,766	263
2003	13,702	3,692	269

== Securities Commission investigation ==
In late 2004, the New Zealand Securities Commission launched an investigation into the company regarding alleged insider trading. In June 2007, David Richwhite (along with his shell company Midavia Railroad, formerly Pacific Railway) agreed to pay NZ$20 million, but he did not admit liability at all. The money was paid out to former Tranz Rail shareholders.

== See also ==
- Toll Group
- KiwiRail
