= Ātiu / Middle Island =

Island in New Zealand

Ātiu or Middle Island

Geography
- Coordinates: 36.637767°S 175.859951°E

Administration
- New Zealand
- Region: Waikato

Demographics
- Population: uninhabited

Ātiu or Middle Island, also known as Atiu Island, or Middle Island, is an island in the middle of the Mercury Islands of New Zealand. Ātiu means "wandering about" and is the original Māori language name for the island. It was assigned its current dual name in December 1994.

== See also ==
- List of islands of New Zealand
