= Iranian New Zealanders =

Total population
- 11,850 Iran-born (2023)

Regions with significant populations
- Auckland, Wellington, Christchurch

Languages
- New Zealand English, Persian, languages of Iran

Religion
- Shia Islam, Baháʼí, Christian, Judaism, Zoroastrianism

Related ethnic groups
- Iranians, Persian people, Azeris

Iranian New Zealanders (Persian: نیوزیلندی‌های ایرانی), informally known as Persian Kiwis, are New Zealanders of Iranian national background or descent who are expatriates or permanent immigrants, and their descendants. The 2006 census found that 2,895 New Zealanders were born in Iran, although the figure of Iranian New Zealanders will be higher than this as many of them are born in another country.

== Migration history ==
Iranians in New Zealand:
Year	Persons
1881	2
1951	20
2001	1,980
2006	2,895
2018	4,659
2023	11,850

Most Iranian New Zealanders came to New Zealand after the Iranian Revolution of 1979. The community expanded in the early 1980s and 1990s during the Iran–Iraq War and its aftermath. However, most Iranian emigrants since 2010 are professionals who revived their residence permit through emigration programs.

== Demography ==
Around half of Iranians in New Zealand are Muslim, but those of Christian background are also present. Among Iranian migrants there are also Baháʼís who had been persecuted for their religion in Iran. From 1987 to 1989, 142 Baháʼís arrived in New Zealand as refugees

== Notable Iranian New Zealanders ==
- Rasoul Amani, New Zealand wrestler who represented New Zealand in Graeco-Roman wrestling at the 2000 Summer Olympics
- Nazanin "Naz" Khanjani, a contestant in Season 2 of The Bachelor NZ (aired on TV3), a reality dating show. She was born in Tehran (the capital of Iran), and moved to New Zealand at the age of 4.
- Golriz Ghahraman, New Zealand politician, member of the Green Party of Aotearoa New Zealand, elected in 2017 member of parliament in the House of representatives in the 52nd New Zealand Parliament.
- Chaii, rapper who was born in Ahvaz and immigrated to New Zealand at 8 years old.

== See also ==
- Iran–New Zealand relations
- Iranian Australians
- Iranian diaspora
- Asian New Zealanders
