= Iran–New Zealand relations =

- Iran: New Zealand

Diplomatic mission
- Embassy of Iran, Wellington: Embassy of New Zealand, Tehran

Iran established diplomatic relations with New Zealand on December 14, 1973. Both countries have recognition from the United Nations. Iran and New Zealand are part of the World Trade Organization.

== History ==
New Zealand established its embassy in Tehran in 1975, marking it as the first diplomatic mission in the Middle East, which indicated Iran's importance as a trading partner at that time. In response to this, Iran established its embassy in Wellington in the mid-1980s.

In the 1980s, there was a peak in trade between the two nations, where Iran emerged as one of New Zealand’s top export markets, which included its sheep meat trade. This trade was crucial in the establishment of the 1985 Joint Ministerial Commission. However, by the late 20th century, trade dynamics changed due to political developments, such as the Iran-Iraq War and subsequent international sanctions against Iran.

=== Political tensions ===
Relations have encountered significant challenges, especially after the United States withdrew from the Joint Comprehensive Plan of Action in 2018, which resulted in renewed sanctions on Iran. New Zealand kept its sanctions against Iran intact, while advising its businesses to obtain legal counsel about the effects of U.S. sanctions. Since late 2022, human rights in Iran have become a critical factor influencing bilateral relations. Following the death of Mahsa Amini and the ensuing protests, New Zealand condemned Iran’s government actions and criticized its human rights violations by suspending the bilateral human rights dialogue and imposing travel bans on Iranian officials.

As of 2024, New Zealand has taken a firm stance against Iranian governmental actions, including condemning its military strikes against Israel and supporting international resolutions against Iran’s human rights violations.

In response to the outbreak of the Twelve-Day War in mid-June 2025, the New Zealand Embassy in Tehran was closed on 19 June. New Zealand Foreign Minister Winston Peters confirmed that two New Zealand embassy staff in Tehran and their families had been evacuated via neighbouring Azerbaijan. On 22 June, Peters confirmed there were about 80 New Zealanders registered in New Zealand. He and Defence Minister Judith Collins confirmed that the New Zealand government would send a C-130J Super Hercules into the Middle East to evacuate New Zealanders in Iran and Israel.

In late August 2025, Foreign Minister Peters condemned Iranian state-sponsored attacks against Jewish institutions in Australia and expressed support for the Albanese government's decision to expel the Iranian Ambassador. While Peters said that the Ministry of Foreign Affairs and Trade would convey New Zealand's concerns to Iranian Ambassador Reza Nazar Ahari, he confirmed that New Zealand would not follow Australia's lead in expelling the Iranian ambassador.

In mid October 2025, Peters confirmed that New Zealand would be reinstating several United Nations sanctions against Iran including asset freezes and travel bans against certain sanctioned individuals and trade bans on certain nuclear and military products. These sanctions were reinstated after Iran withdrew from the JCPOA in September 2025 following the Twelve-Day War in mid-June 2025.

Following to the 2026 Israeli–United States strikes on Iran which began in late February 2026, New Zealand Prime Minister Christopher Luxon and Foreign Minister Peters issued a joint statement defending the strikes as a response to Iranian "threats to international peace and security" and called for a resumption of negotiations and adherence to international law. By contrast, former Prime Minister Helen Clark and Labour leader Chris Hipkins described the US-Israeli airstrikes as a violation of international law. On 5 March, Peters said that the New Zealand Defence Force was ready to send planes to evacuate stranded New Zealanders in the Gulf region when "conditions allow."

On 13 October, Peters joined over 30 Western foreign ministers including Australia, Canada, the United Kingdom, United States and Ireland in condemning several Iranian activities against Western countries including an alleged plot to attack US aircraft at RAF Fairford.

== Educational and cultural collaborations ==
In 2016, both countries signed a memorandum of understanding to enhance educational cooperation, allowing Iranian government sponsorship for students to study in New Zealand. This agreement laid the groundwork for fostering cultural and academic exchanges between the two nations.

== Resident diplomatic missions ==
- Iran has an embassy in Wellington.
- New Zealand has an embassy in Tehran.

== Issues and controversies ==
=== Detained New Zealanders ===
In July 2022, two social media influencers and New Zealand citizens, Christopher Richwhite and Bridget Thackwray, were detained by authorities upon entering Iran. They were released in October 2022. Iranian-born Greens MP and Greens party human rights spokesperson, Golriz Ghahraman, said that while she was “hugely relieved that they have now left Iran”, she also stated “New Zealand’s stance and our unwillingness to … introduce the kind of actions or statements that other like-minded nations have done has been highly unusual...It’s reasonable to assume this [the couple’s detainment] had some influence”. In response, Prime Minister Jacinda Ardern said that the detainment did not result in a softer stance: “It did not. Of course, we have shared our condemnation. At the same time, we have had also a duty of care to try and ensure that those New Zealanders were able to exit Iran." Ardern further said that the New Zealand government had been “working hard” for several months to secure their freedom. She said that the couple had been in “difficult circumstances” but declined to say where in Iran they had been held.

It was reported that the media decided not to deliberately report on the couple's detention until they were released. Richwite is the son of New Zealand businessman David Richwhite.

== See also ==
- Foreign relations of Iran
- Foreign relations of New Zealand
- Iranian New Zealanders
