= Mercury Islands =

Island group in New Zealand

Ahuahu (Mercury Islands)
Iles d'Haussez
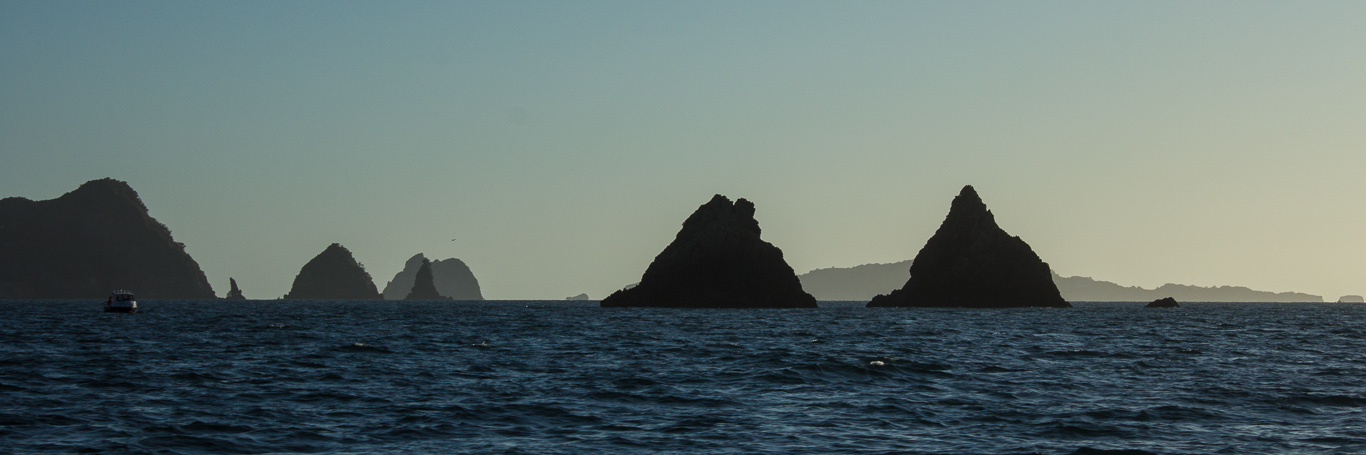
- View of the Mercury Islands

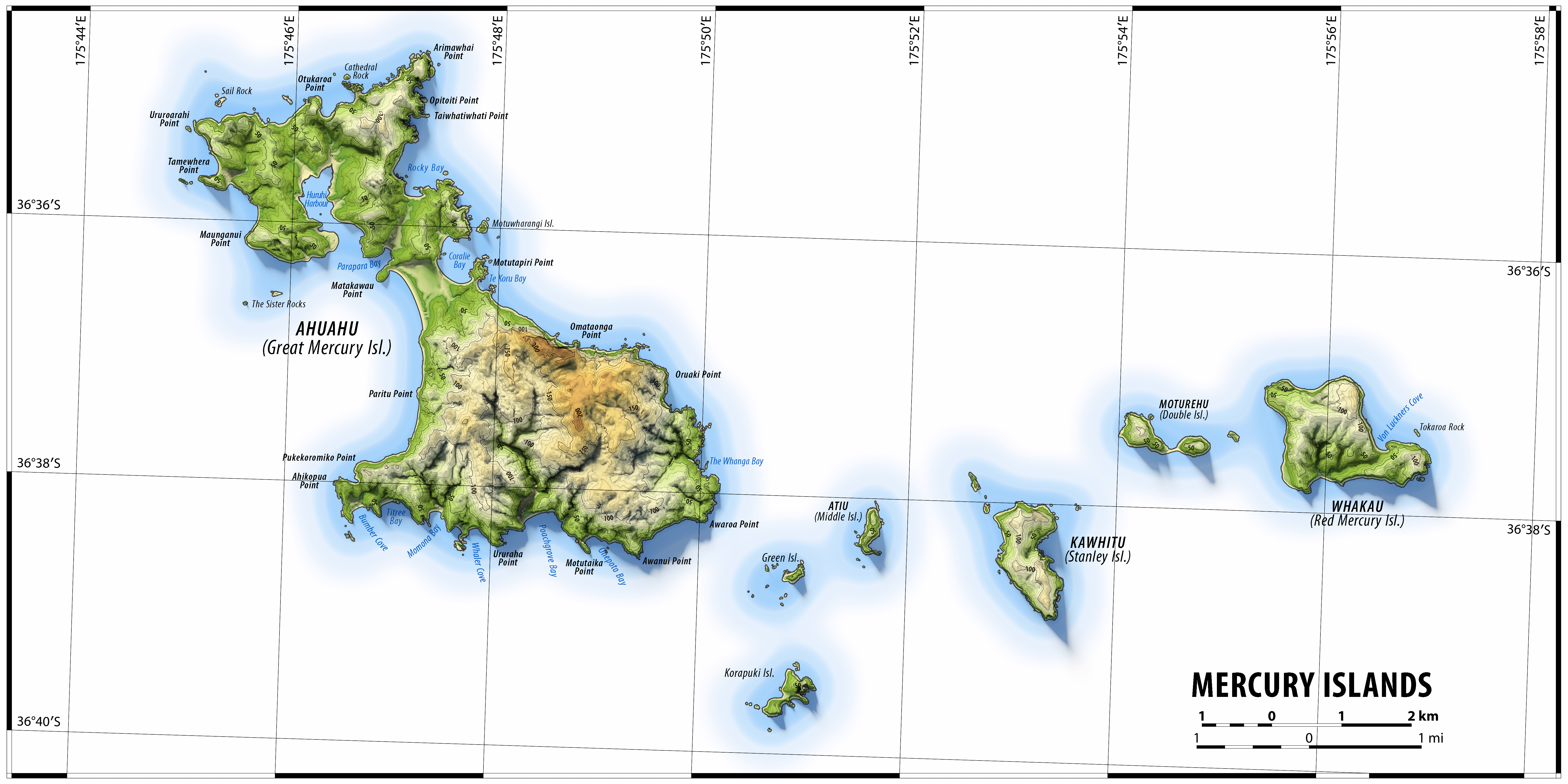
- Topographic map of the Mercury Islands

- Location of the Mercury Islands in New Zealand

Geography
- Coordinates: 36°35′S 175°55′E
- Adjacent to: South Pacific Ocean
- Total islands: 16
- Major islands: Great Mercury Island (Ahuahu), Red Mercury Island (Whakau), Double Island (Moturehu), Kawhitu or Stanley Island, Ātiu or Middle Island, Korapuki Island

Administration
- New Zealand

The Mercury Islands are a group of seven islands off the northeast coast of New Zealand's North Island. They are located 8 kilometres (5 mi) off the coast of the Coromandel Peninsula, and 35 kilometres (22 mi) northeast of the town of Whitianga.

== History ==
Great Mercury Island (Ahuahu) was settled early in Māori history, becoming a major site for toki (adze) quarry and manufacture, supporting a semi-permanent population. In Ngāti Porou traditions, the ancestor Paikea first arrived on the island after travelling from Hawaiki. The islands are within the modern day rohe of Ngāti Hei and the Ngāti Whanaunga hapū Ngāti Karaua.

The islands were observed by James Cook in 1769, who named the islands, along with Mercury Bay on the Coromandel Peninsula, due to Cook observing the 1769 Transit of Mercury near the islands and the bay. In 1827, French explorer Dumont d’Urville sighted the islands, giving them the French name Iles d'Haussez.

A settler claimed to have bought Great Mercury Island in 1839. Great Mercury (Ahuahu), Kawhitu or Stanley Island and Double Island (Moturehu) were purchased and taken as crown land in 1858–65. These included Whakakapua (7^{3} acres) and Kowhaka (21 acres) being purchased in January 1865. Despite inhabiting Ahuahu, the Ngati Hei were not consulted about this purchase. Under private ownership, the islands were farmed by Pākehā settlers, developing isolated cattle and sheep farms.

A 2017 settlement recognized that Ngāti Hei have a legitimate claim to Great Mercury Island.

== Description ==
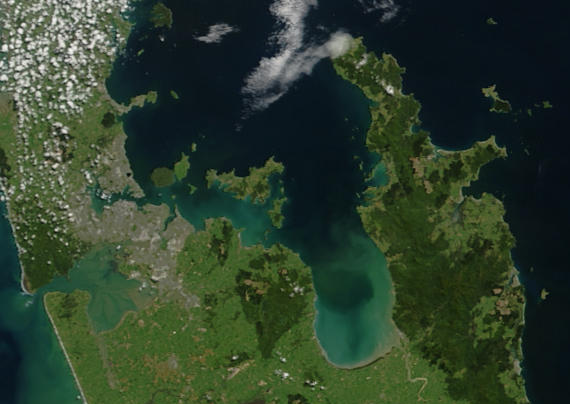
A true-colour image acquired by NASA's Terra satellite, on 23 October 2002. The Mercury Islands are just visible at top right, to the northeast of the Coromandel Peninsula.

The main chain of the Mercury Islands consists of the large Great Mercury Island (also known as Ahuahu) to the west, Red Mercury Island (Whakau) to the east, and five much smaller islands between the two (Korapuki, Green, Atiu/Middle, Kawhitu/Stanley and Moturehu/Double Islands). All the islands, except Ahuahu/Great Mercury Island, have statutory protection and are managed by the Department of Conservation as highly valuable Nature Reserves where public access prohibited. Ahuahu/Great Mercury Island is privately owned and public access is allowed (excluding residential sites and the planted pine forest). One lone island, Repanga/Cuvier Island, also a protected Nature Reserve, lies 15 kilometres (9.3 mi) to the north of Ahuahu/Great Mercury Island, although this island is not normally considered part of the Mercury Island group.

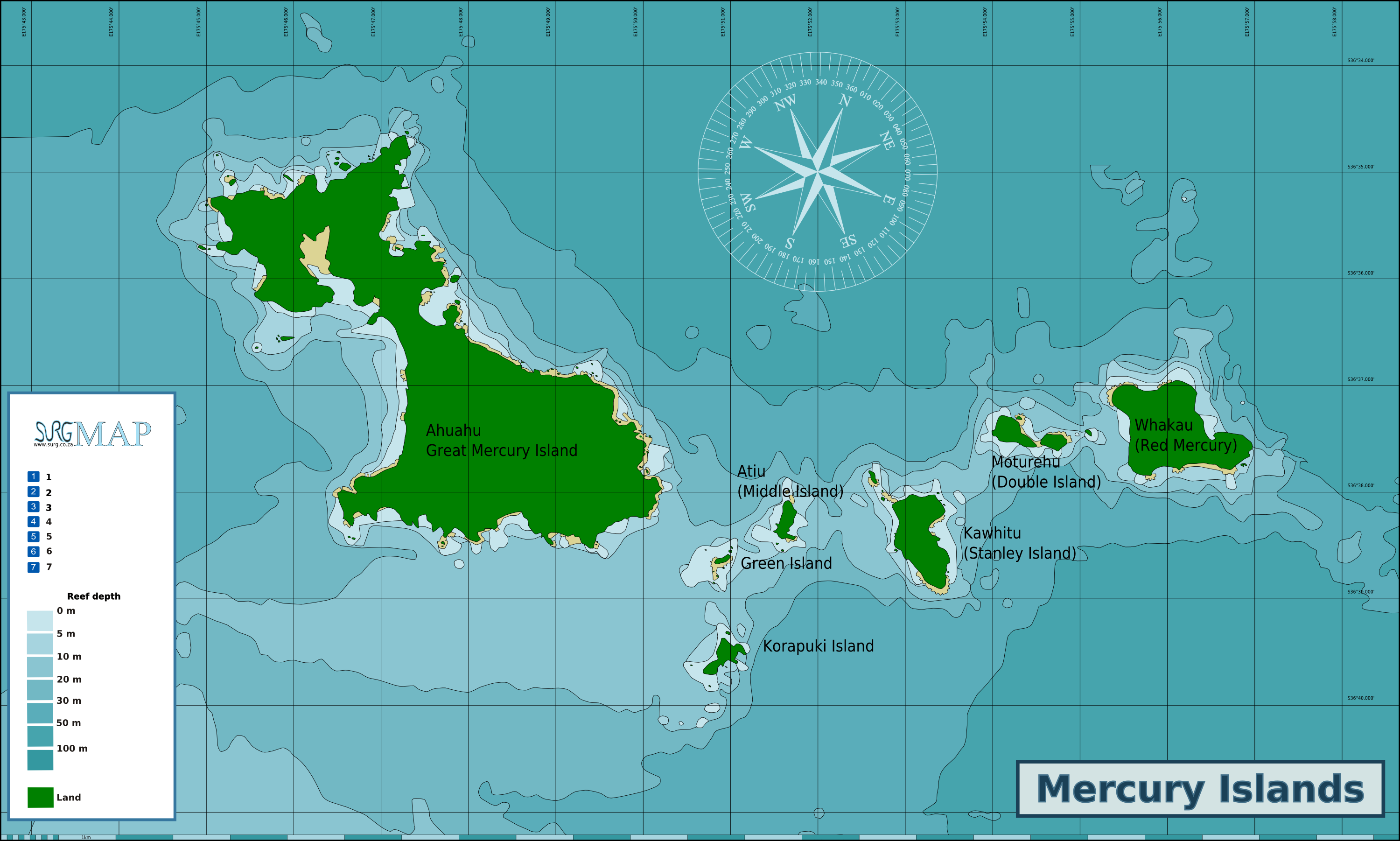
Dive map of the Mercury Islands

Approximately 18,000 years ago during the Last Glacial Maximum when sea levels were over 100 metres lower than present day levels, the islands were hilly features surrounded by a vast coastal plain. Sea levels began to rise 7,000 years ago, after which the islands separated from the rest of New Zealand. When sea levels were lower, the Opitonui River flowed east to the Pacific Ocean between Cuvier Island and Ahuahu/Great Mercury Island.

=== Ahuahu / Great Mercury Island ===
Ahuahu / Great Mercury Island, 1872 ha, is the largest of Mercury Islands and the only one with permanent residents or public access. It is the remnants of a Pliocene rhyolitic volcano. In pre-colonial times, the island was the location of at least 20 pā, including Matakawau, a pā on the western side of the island where extensive archaeological excavations were undertaken in the 1950s. Archaeological investigations by the University of Auckland continue on the island as sites were exposed by a storm in 2009. During the latter 19th century, the island was a location for kauri gum digging.

The island is owned by Michael Fay and David Richwhite, two prominent New Zealand businessmen. The private island, which features two luxurious residences, can be hired for around $20,000 NZD per day. U2's lead singer Bono and guitarist The Edge stayed on the island during U2's Vertigo concerts in Auckland in November 2006. On 30 November 2009, Ahuahu/Great Mercury Island hosted the first successful launch of Rocket Lab's suborbital Atea-1 sounding rocket.

In 2014, Fay and Richwhite, in partnership with the Department of Conservation, successfully undertook an eradication program to remove kiore, ship rats and cats from the island. In 2016, it was declared pest free, making the entire Mercury Island Group free from introduced mammalian pests. The island remains open to the public to showcase conservation and provide an accessible pest-free island in the Mercury Island Group.

=== Whakau / Red Mercury Island ===
Whakau is the easternmost of the Mercury Islands, and at 2.3 kilometres (1.4 mi) across is also the second-largest. The entire island is surrounded by reddish cliffs up to 100 metres (330 ft) high, prompting Captain James Cook to give the island its European name on his exploration of the area in 1769. The island was briefly used by Count Felix von Luckner as a hiding spot during World War One during his attempted escape from New Zealand en route to the Kermadec Islands, with a cove on the island's northern coast bearing his name to commemorate this. As with the rest of the Mercury Islands, Whakau is volcanic, with evidence of this history evident around the island's coast.

=== Other islands ===
The smaller islands in the group have been identified as an Important Bird Area by BirdLife International because they provide nesting sites for up to 3000 breeding pairs of Pycroft's petrels. Moturehu/Double Island and Whakau/Red Mercury are home to the critically endangered Mercury Islands tusked wētā.

== See also ==
- List of islands of New Zealand
