= Rail World =

American rail transport holding company

- Type: Private
- Industry: Rail transport
- Founded: July 1999
- Founder: Edward Burkhardt
- Headquarters: Rosemont, Illinois, United States
- Area served: United States, Poland, Ukraine
- Key people: Edward Burkhardt (President & CEO)
- Subsidiaries: Rail Polska; Rail World Locomotive Leasing; Rail World Ukraine; Baltic Rail OU

Rail World is a rail transport holding company. Its specialties include railway management, consulting, investment, privatizations, and restructurings. Its purpose is to promote rail industry privatization by bringing together government bodies wishing to sell their stakes with investment capital and management skills.

== Overview ==
Rail World was incorporated in July 1999 by Edward Burkhardt, who is the President and Chief Executive Officer.

Rail World's assets consist of Rail Polska (Poland) and Baltic Rail OU (Estonia).

== Subsidiaries ==
- AS Baltic Rail OU (container train operator)
- Rail Polska (freight railway operations)
- Rail World Locomotive Leasing, (locomotive leasing)
- Rail World Ukraine, a freight forwarding service

== Response to Lac-Mégantic derailment ==
After the derailment at Lac-Mégantic, Quebec, Canada of a Montreal, Maine & Atlantic Railway (MM&A) freight train on July 6, 2013 which left 47 people dead or missing, president Edward Burkhardt visited Lac-Mégantic on July 10, 2013, and was heckled by residents who were critical of his company's response to the incident. After the accident the railway's safety record was called into question. Over the previous decade the firm recorded a higher accident rate than the rest of the US rail fleet, according to data from the Federal Railroad Administration. In the previous year the railroad had 36.1 accidents per million miles travelled, in comparison to a national average of 14.6 accidents per million miles traveled.

On August 7, 2013, the MM&A filed for bankruptcy protection in both the Quebec Superior Court in Montreal (under the Companies' Creditors Arrangement Act) and the United States Bankruptcy Court in Bangor, Maine (under Chapter 11). The company owes more than seven million dollars to the municipality of Lac-Mégantic in cleanup costs the town has already paid to MM&A contractors and owes severance pay to its laid-off workers; liabilities are expected to increase as lawsuits are filed on behalf of victims of the disaster and as the long process of environmental decontamination and local rebuilding continues. The MM&A's certificate of fitness was revoked by the Canadian Transportation Agency on August 13, 2013, citing inadequate liability insurance; this effectively bans the MM&A from operating in Canada.

== Former subsidiaries ==
- Eesti Raudtee (25.5%) from August 2001 until January 2007
- San Luis Central Railroad from 1969 to 2024
