= Edward Burkhardt =

American railroad executive

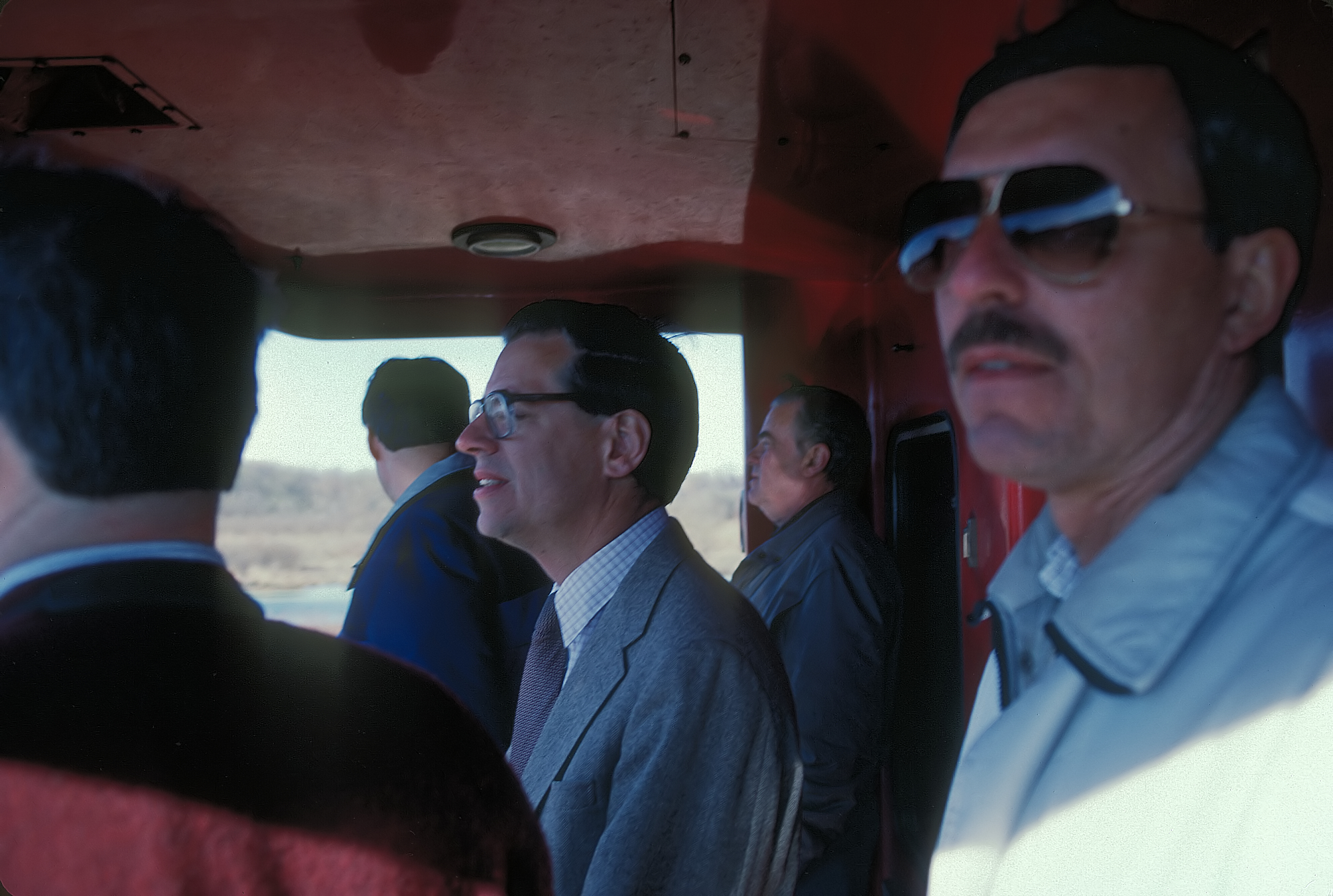
- Edward Burkhardt (center) in 1988
- Born: Edward Arnold Burkhardt; July 23, 1938 (age 88)
- Education: Yale University
- Occupations: President and CEO of Rail World
- Known for: Founder of Wisconsin Central and Rail World

Edward Arnold Burkhardt is a railroad executive, the founder and current chairman of Rail World.

== Career ==
After gaining a Bachelor of Science with honors in Industrial Administration from Yale University and studying Rail Transportation at Yale's graduate school, Burkhardt initially worked for the Wabash Railroad. He was then an executive with the Chicago & North Western Railroad, first as vice president of marketing and then vice president of operations. He also helped back the railroad’s short-lived steam program, which primarily used steam locomotive No. 1385.

=== Wisconsin Central Transportation Corporation ===
Following passage of the Staggers Rail Act, on April 3, 1987, Soo Line Railroad announced the sale of its Lake States Transportation Division to private investors led by Burkhardt and Thomas F. Power Jr., former chief financial officer at the Milwaukee Road, creating the new Wisconsin Central (WC). The first WC train ran from Stevens Point to North Fond du Lac, Wisconsin on October 11, 1987. Burkhardt was chairman, president and chief executive officer of the company for 12 years, during which Burkhardt also:

- Authorized WCTC to buy the Algoma Central Railway
- Became chairman and CEO of English Welsh & Scottish Railway that bought five railway operations from the British Railways Board, handling 93% of rail freight in the United Kingdom
- Founded the Australian Transport Network, which purchased AN Tasrail and the Emu Bay Railway
- Named Railroader of the Year in 1999 by Railway Age magazine

The Weyauwega derailment prominent amongst safety problems that emerged during Burkhardt's tenure. By 1997 the WC stock price had peaked and began to decline. At the same time, the foreign holdings of WC suffered poor returns from 1997–1999. Management issues at WC became apparent as Burkhardt favored investment for the long term whereas Power favored cutting expenses; this reportedly led to frequent clashes between the two executives and culminated in a July 7, 1999, special meeting of the WC board of directors in which Burkhardt was asked to resign.

After a failed proxy battle, in 2001 WCTC and the former Illinois Central Railroad were purchased by Canadian National, and merged into their United States holdings. The overseas railroad holdings were put up for sale, and have slowly been sold off.

=== Honorary Consul ===
In 1997, Burkhardt, while CEO and president of Wisconsin Central Transportation Company, was appointed by the New Zealand government as its honorary consul to Chicago. Previously, he had led the privatisation of New Zealand Rail during the 1990s and was chairman of Tranz Rail for six years, between September 1993 and August 1999.

=== Rail World ===
In July 1999 Rail World was incorporated by Burkhardt, who is the president and chief executive officer. As part of Rail World operations:

- Bought the Montreal, Maine & Atlantic Railway with a 75% share ownership.
- Led the Estonian Railways privatization in 2001, and was chairman until the company was repurchased by the government in 2007
- Founded Rail Polska, which has an unrestricted operator license on the Polish rail network.

=== Lac-Mégantic derailment ===
A derailment at Lac-Mégantic, Quebec, Canada of a runaway Montreal, Maine & Atlantic Railway (MM&A) oil train on July 6, 2013 killed 47 residents and incinerated much of the downtown. Burkhardt waited four days before visiting Lac-Mégantic; on his July 10, 2013 arrival, he was heckled by residents.

As a result of the incident the safety record of MM&A was called into question, particularly with respect to Burkhardt's one-crew policy. Under Burkhardt's ownership and control over the previous decade, MM&A recorded an accident rate higher than rest of the US rail fleet, according to data from the Federal Railroad Administration. For instance, in the year prior to the Lac-Mégantic accident, MM&A had an accident rate more than twice the national average—36.1 accidents per million miles traveled, compared to a national average of 14.6. The Toronto Star also noted that "when Burkhardt took over in 2003, he cut employee wages by 40 per cent" and "locomotive crews were cut in half, replacing two workers with one." Following the Lac-Mégantic disaster Burkhardt initially blamed the Nantes, Quebec fire brigade for shutting down the unattended locomotive to extinguish an engine fire, then he announced that the railway had suspended Tom Harding, the engineer and only crew-member of the runaway train, for improperly setting the handbrakes on the rail cars before retiring for the night to a local motel.

On August 6, 2013, Burkhardt stated that MM&A has no further plans to carry oil by rail. The next day, MM&A filed for bankruptcy protection under US Chapter 11 and Canada's Companies' Creditors Arrangement Act. The Canadian Transportation Agency shut down the remaining Canadian MM&A operations effective August 20, citing inadequate liability insurance. The Canadian Transportation Agency, a quasi-judicial administrative court, had approved MM&A’s insurance coverage in 2002, and the railway had renewed its Certificate of Fitness, which is the license to operate with the CTA, annually since then. Section 94(1) of the Canada Transportation Act mandates the conditions under which "The holder of a certificate of fitness shall notify the Agency in writing without delay if (a) the liability insurance coverage is cancelled or altered so that it may no longer be adequate; or (b) the construction or operation has changed so that the liability insurance coverage may no longer be adequate," and a significant change in MM&A operations had occurred with the initiation of crude oil shipments on MM&A trains in April 2012, yet Burkhardt failed to inform the CTA of the change. As of 12 September 2013, the Canadian authorities had not yet completed their investigation of the Lac-Megantic derailment incident. According to news reports on March 22, 2014, the Quebec police had completed their investigation and turned the files over to prosecutors who were expected to file charges on criminal negligence against Burkhardt.

Criminal negligence charges were ultimately filed against MM&A as a corporation and against three individual workers (the dispatcher, engineer and operations manager).

| Preceded by David R. Goode (Norfolk Southern) | Railroader of the Year; 1999 | Succeeded by The Railroad Worker |
