= Winebox Inquiry =

1994–1997 New Zealand Commission of Inquiry into corruption

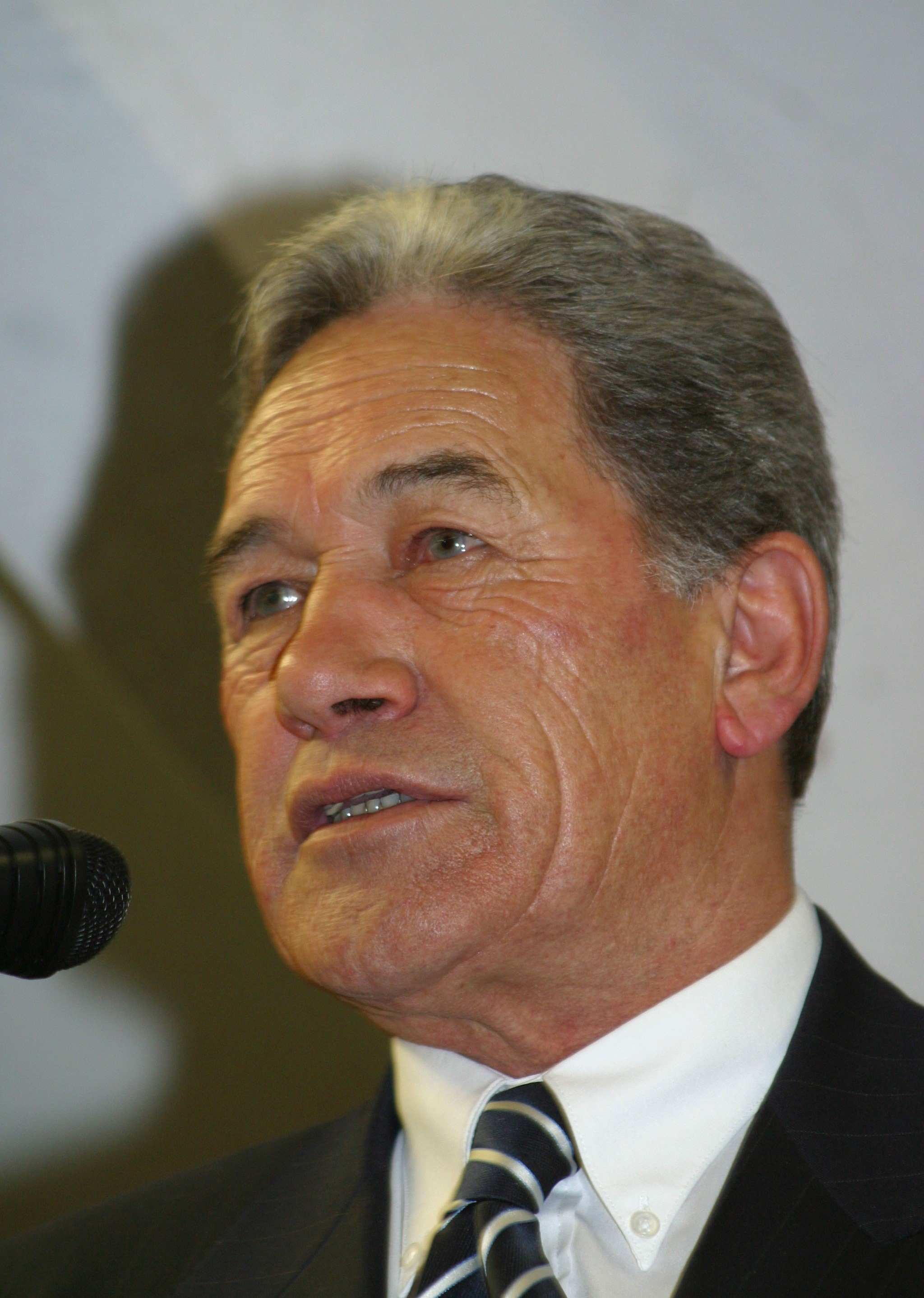
Winston Peters, who instigated the winebox inquiry

The Commission of Inquiry into Certain Matters Relating to Taxation, popularly known as the Winebox Inquiry, was an inquiry undertaken in New Zealand to investigate claims of corruption and incompetence in the Serious Fraud Office (SFO) and Inland Revenue Department (IRD).

The Commissioner was Sir Ronald Davison. The Commission concluded that there were no grounds supporting the allegations of fraud and corruption. The inquiry was characterised by extensive litigation, both during and afterwards and by an extremely high level of public interest. The Commission was established in September 1994 and reported nearly three years later in August 1997.

== Popular name ==
The Commission became popularly known as the Winebox Inquiry, as Winston Peters brought the documents at the centre of the allegations to Parliament in a winebox. The box contained numerous documents relating to a range of transactions entered into or contemplated by a number of parties.

== History ==
In 1992, New Zealand politician Winston Peters made repeated claims in Parliament of criminality associated with tax planning undertaken by some of New Zealand's largest companies (some involving tax deals with the Cook Islands) as well as fraud and incompetence by both the Inland Revenue Department and the Serious Fraud Office.

Journalist Ian Wishart was assigned by the TV3 network to report on the case. He came into possession of documents relating to tax avoidance and tax evasion, known as the "Winebox" documents as they were in an old wine carton. Wishart investigated them in secret for TV3 and then TVNZ, but the proposed December 1993 broadcast was stopped by the TVNZ board and a court injunction. After Wishart leaked details of the programme, it was eventually broadcast in June 1994 as a special primetime two-hour broadcast.

Public pressure eventually forced the government to set up the inquiry in 1994. The terms of reference of the Commission of Inquiry required it to report upon whether the Inland Revenue Department and the Serious Fraud Office had acted in a lawful, proper and competent manner in dealing with the transactions under investigation, and to examine whether any changes to the criminal or tax laws should be made to protect New Zealand's income tax base from the effects of fraud, evasion and avoidance.

== The Magnum Transaction ==
The transaction at the centre of the Winebox Inquiry was known as the "Magnum" transaction. In fact the documents in the winebox outlined more than 60 different transactions involving a range of parties.

In September 1986 a European Pacific Investments (EPI) subsidiary based in New Zealand lent money to another subsidiary based in the Cook Islands. Withholding taxes of $2 million on that loan were paid to the Cook Islands Tax Office, and a tax certificate for that sum was duly issued. European Pacific presented this certificate to the tax office in New Zealand, and as there was no further New Zealand tax to pay, paid a dividend to an investor, a brewery called Magnum. In the Cook Islands, another member of the EPI group received a financial benefit from the Cook Islands government, and simultaneously forgave a loan to the government. The net effect: one EPI company received a benefit of $850,000 from the Cook Islands government, and yet another subsidiary received a New Zealand tax credit of $2 million.

== Controversy ==
Although the Commission concluded that there was no fraud or incompetence, controversy surrounded these rulings.

The Law Commission identified four court cases which arose during or immediately after the inquiry; this indicates the degree of litigation and controversy surrounding it. Other court cases also surfaced, for example against TVNZ, in relation to the inquiry's subject matter.

Subsequent appeals were made seeking to overturn the Commission's findings. Most notable of these was a case for judicial review initiated by Winston Peters against the Commissioner, which effectively resulted in an upholding of Davison's findings. A subsequent ruling of the Court of Appeal overturned this finding and referred the matter back to the High Court. The final ruling of the High Court was that four of the findings of the commission which related to the Magnum transaction were struck out as a result of errors in law by the commission. Also struck out were associated criticisms by Winston Peters to the extent that they related to those errors in law. The Court stated:

"Declarations (1) to (4) [striking out the findings relating to Magnum] are not, and are not intended to suggest, findings by this Court that there has been fraud or incompetence. The effect of the declarations is as if the words in the Winebox report to which they relate were crossed out, leaving the Winebox report incomplete in these respects. Declaration (5) [striking out the related criticism of Winston Peters] will ameliorate the criticisms made of the plaintiff which are related to those errors. The Winebox report remains otherwise unaffected."

Both sides to the debate claimed victory.

== Aftermath ==
Changes to tax laws relating to the claiming of foreign tax credits were made. New rules relating to disclosure to the Inland Revenue Department and penalties for non-compliance were introduced.

To this day controversy remains as to who "won".
