= Berkshire Partners =

American private equity firm

Berkshire Partners LLC
- Type: Private
- Industry: Private equity
- Founded: 1984; 42 years ago
- Headquarters: Boston, Massachusetts, United States
- Products: Private equity funds, Leveraged buyouts
- AUM: ▲US$ 25 billion
- Website: www.berkshirepartners.com

Berkshire Partners LLC is an American private equity firm based in Boston. Since its founding it has made more than 150 private equity investments through eleven funds, the most recent being Berkshire Fund XI, which closed in 2024 with about $7.8 billion in commitments. Berkshire has developed specific industry experience in several areas including consumer products and retail, business services, communications, industrials and healthcare. The firm has invested over $50 million to $500 million of equity capital in each portfolio company.

Berkshire Partners typically makes equity investments of $50 million to $500 million in companies with enterprise values between $100 million and $1.5 billion. The firm seeks to partner with management teams to help grow their businesses and create long-term value.

== History ==
Berkshire Partners was founded by Bradley M. Bloom, J. Christopher Clifford, Carl Ferenbach, Richard K. Lubin and Russell L. Epker in 1984. The firm traces its roots back to Boston's Thomas H. Lee Partners, a large-cap private equity firm founded a decade earlier. Its eleventh private equity fund, Berkshire Fund XI, closed in October 2024 with about $7.8 billion in commitments, the largest in the firm's history.

- Berkshire Fund I (1984) – $59 million
- Berkshire Fund II (1986) – $125 million
- Berkshire Fund III (1992) – $168 million
- Berkshire Fund IV (1996) – $387 million
- Berkshire Fund V (1998) – $985 million
- Berkshire Fund VI (2002) – $1.7 billion
- Berkshire Fund VII (2006) – $3.1 billion
- Berkshire Fund VIII (2011) – $4.5 billion
- Berkshire Fund IX (2016) – $5.5 billion
- Berkshire Fund X (2021) – $5.8 billion
- Berkshire Fund XI (2024) – $7.8 billion

== Portfolio ==
Since its inception in 1984, Berkshire Partners has invested in over 100 companies and developed specific industry experience in several areas including consumer products and retail, business services, communications, industrials and healthcare.
