= Belleville and North Hastings Railway =

Overview
- Headquarters: Belleville, Ontario
- Locale: Hastings County, Ontario, Canada
- Dates of operation: 1880–1984

Technical
- Track gauge: 4 ft 8 1/2 in (1,435 mm) standard gauge
- Length: 33 km (21 mi)

The Belleville and North Hastings Railway (B&NHR) was a short-line railway in Hastings County, Ontario, Canada. It branched off the Grand Junction Railway (GJR) north of Belleville and ended on the Central Ontario Railway (COR) outside Eldorado for a total distance of 33 kilometres (21 mi). In spite of its name, the line did not reach either Belleville or the northern part of Hastings County.

The line was completed in January 1880 and leased to the GJR in June that year. Both companies were merged into the Midland Railway of Canada in 1881, part of the Midland's efforts to consolidate a number of unprofitable lines east of Toronto. The section north of Madoc offered nothing the COR lacked and closed in 1893. The section from Madoc remained in use until the 1980s as a branch line of CN known as the Madoc Subdivision. This section eventually closed in 1984.

Like many railways dismantled since the 1970s, the Madoc Sub right-of-way has been turned over to rail-trail use, and now forms the "Trail of Two Lakes", with the views around Moira Lake considered particularly noteworthy. The section north of Madoc was abandoned years earlier and has returned to bush, but is still navigable for the adventuresome.

== History ==
=== Gold rush ===
The 1866 discovery of gold on John Richardson's farm by Marcus Herbert Powell led to the creation of Ontario's first gold mine, and the community of Eldorado that formed up around it by 1867. Although the mines were not rich and the Richardson Mine closed shortly thereafter, the area proved to create a gold rush that led to similar mines being opened all around the Central Ontario region. At least six gold mines opened, and later a number of copper and iron mines as well, mostly in Hastings County.

Belleville, due south of the mines, became the hub for prospectors on their way north to the fields. The town became known as the "Gateway to the Golden North". Belleville was also a major stop on the Grand Trunk Railway running from Montreal to Toronto. At first the only access to the mines was via coach, so a railway from Belleville to the mining areas was a natural development.

=== B&NHR ===
To serve this burgeoning market a race started between several railway companies, including the Victoria Railway, the Toronto and Nipissing Railway and a Trent River-connected route based on the Cobourg and Peterborough Railway. However, all of these led westward to the Toronto area, less than ideal for access to the major markets and ports to the east.

Business interests in Belleville naturally felt their own city was a better location to service the fields, and chartered the B&NHR in 1874. The company was formed with a total stock purchase of $17,000 that summer, and several thousand dollars of additional money was spent on a survey of the route as far as the Moore iron mine in Madoc. This led to a bonus being raised by the town of Madoc, with $30,000 to be paid to the company on completion of the line.

Construction on the line, under the direction of Francis Shanly, began to Madoc some time in the mid-1870s, likely 1877. (Note: The exact sequence and dates of construction are the subject of considerable confusion in modern sources. Brown notes that the GJR reached Stirling in 1877, but most other sources state that construction on the GJR didn't start until 1879. It is likely Brown is actually referring to the B&NHR.) At some point the owners of the Belleville-based Grand Junction Railway purchased the B&NHR, using it as their approach to Belleville on their Peterborough-Belleville route. (Note: The Archives notes state this occurred in 1875, but most other sources state this was in 1880. The date is likely between these extremes, as construction on the GJR began in 1879, which presumes the B&NHR already existed at that point.) The GJR was branched off the B&NHR near Stirling, at what became known as Madoc Junction.

Further expansion of the original B&NHR route was delayed, with the line ending in Madoc. Progress on the original route did not begin again for a decade, by which time their proposed areas of operation were being served by the Central Ontario Railway. A connection to the COR outside Eldorado was completed in 1887.

=== Midland and mergers ===
The GJR reached Peterborough in June 1880, by which point several other railways were operating the Peterborough to Toronto route and their "loop" plans no longer made sense. Instead, the company started looking in other directions, and settled on a route to Lindsay, where they hoped to capture some of the lucrative grain trade from the Georgian Bay area. This represented a serious threat to the Midland Railway, whose line was one of the few that offered access to the Great Lakes without routing through an increasingly congested Toronto.

By the 1880s there were a number of short-line railways east of Toronto that all served regional markets and competed for business. Chronically under-capitalized, all of these lines became takeover targets. The Midland had long been on friendly terms with the Toronto and Nipissing (T&N) and had been considering a merger with them for some time. In 1881 the companies arranged a massive merger that included the Midland, the Toronto & Nipissing, the Victoria, the Whitby, Port Perry and Lindsay Railway, the aborted Toronto and Ottawa Railway and the Lake Simcoe Junction Railway, a subsidiary of the T&N. The new Midland now included almost all of the railways serving the areas east of Toronto, and itself became a prime takeover target. In 1884 the Grand Trunk leased the entire network.

This amalgamation led to several redundant routes, and over the next few years the GTR began a consolidation effort. With the completion of the Central Ontario Railway through the B&NHR's route, which was better constructed and offered service further north as well, the northern section of the B&NHR was one such redundancy, closing in 1913. (Note: Brown and the Southern Ontario Railways map states this section was closed in 1913, but several online sources say this happened 1893. The earlier date may refer to the GTR's takeover of the Midland running rights that year, but this is unknown.) This left only the southern section open, effectively a Belleville to Madoc spur.

The Grand Trunk suffered an infamous bankruptcy in 1919 and led to its assets being taken over by CNR in 1923. The B&NHR operated as the Madoc Subdivision under CN, while the GJR became the Campbellford Subdivision.

=== Abandonment and conversion ===
Both subdivisions operated profitably for many years, forming CN's eastern mainline into Peterborough as well as continuing to serve various industries and passenger routes around Madoc. Use fell after the 1960s, and the Madoc Sub was abandoned in 1984. This was followed shortly by the abandonment of the main section of the GJR between Belleville and Peterborough in 1987, leaving only industrial spurs in Belleville.

Like many recently abandoned lines, the B&NHR has seen continued use as the Trail of Two Lakes (or "Two Lakes Trail"). The rail trail currently ends at Ontario Highway 7 in Madoc, the section north to Eldorado having long ago returned to farmland and bush. This northern section is navigable, but only with some difficulty.

== Route ==
Based largely on the Southern Ontario Railway Map with confirmation on Google Earth.

The B&NHR started at Madoc Junction (originally North Hastings Jct.), named for the location it was branching to, not where it was actually located. The Junction was just north of Tuftsville Road, just west of Ontario Highway 62 about 6 km due east of Stirling. The line runs northeast from the junction, crossing Rawdon Creek at West Huntingdon Station on Moira Road. The line bends northward past Ivanhoe Station and Crookston before bending sharply around Moira Lake where it crosses a large trestle bridge. From the bridge, the route turns slightly west, entering Madoc on the western side of town and crossing St. Lawrence Street at an angle. Madoc station was located on the north side of the street. A short section between St. Lawrence and Seymore St. West now forms Hill Ave.

North of Madoc the line runs generally north-northwest, remaining fairly obvious until it reaches Mill Road a short distance north of town. From there it gradually forms a series of larger curves as it reaches rougher terrain, crossing O'Hara Road several times. It reaches the former Central Ontario Railway, today known as the Hastings Heritage Trail, about 1 km west-southwest of Eldorado. The location of the junction is still visible from the Hastings trail, in the form of a line of trees curving off to the south.

== See also ==
- Grand Junction Railway (Ontario)
- Central Ontario Railway
- List of Ontario railways
