= Irondale, Bancroft and Ottawa Railway =

Former railway in Ontario, Canada

Overview
- Reporting mark: IB&O
- Locale: Ontario, Canada
- Dates of operation: 1880–1960

Technical
- Track gauge: 4 ft 8 1/2 in (1,435 mm) standard gauge
- Length: 50.9 miles (81.9 km)

The Irondale, Bancroft and Ottawa Railway (IB&O) was a short line railway in Central Ontario, Canada. The line was originally opened in 1878 as the Myles Branch Tramway, a horse-drawn wagonway connecting the Snowdon Iron Mine to the Victoria Railway a few miles away. The line was taken over by a group looking to build a northern extension of the Toronto and Nipissing Railway (T&N) as the Toronto and Nipissing Eastern Extension Railway. This extension was never built; instead, the company rechartered as the IB&O and used the Tramway as the basis for a new line with the ultimate aim to connect Orillia to the Ottawa area.

The Tramway initially ran east from Howland to Furnace Falls, and the IB&O began pushing further northeast through Irondale, Gooderham, Wilberforce and Harcourt, then turning east for Bancroft. Construction stopped at Baptiste Lake when the owner died in July 1899. The line was eventually purchased by Mackenzie and Mann in 1909, who connected it to the Central Ontario Railway (COR) outside Bancroft in July 1910. The IB&O leased the COR, and then both were merged with Mackenzie and Mann's Canadian Northern Railway (CNoR) in 1911.

CNoR's bankruptcy in 1916 led to the line ultimately becoming part of the Canadian National Railways (CN) in 1923. The route saw little use and was abandoned in March 1960, with the rails lifted by the end of July. Only a short section near Bancroft remained, operating as a spur on the COR serving a Domtar plant. The COR was abandoned in 1984. Due to its relatively early abandonment, the IB&O did not see conversion to rail trail, unlike the COR which is now a popular recreational trail. Some sections have been used for roads, but most of it has returned to bush, while some sections were sold to private owners.

== History ==
=== Iron rush ===
Iron was first discovered at Blairton at the western end of Crowe Lake in 1816, but a mine was not constructed until 1820. An iron smelter was built at nearby Marmora, at the eastern end of the lake, and opened for service in 1823. At the time, the only form of transport was via the waterways to railheads some distance to the west, and this limited shipping to the summer months. The mine changed hands several times before falling into ruin in 1848.

A solution was provided by the Cobourg, Peterborough, and Marmora Rail and Mining Company, a reformed version of the Cobourg and Peterborough Railway which had previously gone bankrupt. In 1866, they constructed 14 kilometres (8.7 mi) of railway from Blairton to the Trent River, using the ever extending Trent–Severn Waterway to move the ore by boat to their previous railhead on Rice Lake. This route required several off and on loadings, but was nevertheless successful, and by 1870 the Blairton mine was the largest in Ontario. The mine operated with decreasing output until 1883, when it filled in with water and the railway trestle was damaged by ice.

=== Railway rush ===
By this time several other mines had opened in the area, including the first gold mine at Eldorado in 1866. This led to another wave of prospecting further north, the discovery of new ore, and the need to ship to market. A small railway boom followed and lasted into the early 1870s as a number of companies started projects attempting to service the mines. Among the many attempts were the Central Ontario Railway out of Trenton, the Belleville and North Hastings Railway a short distance to the east of the COR, and the Bay of Quinte Railway further east.

Railways and colonization roads led easier access for prospectors, allowing them to strike out further into central Ontario. New finds were made outside the original Blairton area, areas that the new railways were not well suited to handle. W. Robinson and J.B. Campbell began what was a series of new sources of iron ore on their land near Devil's Creek. It was Campbell who discovered high-quality examples on land belonging to Robert Gibson, but the company formed to exploit this discovery was owned by Robinson and two people from Toronto named Shertis and Savigney. The company was named the Snowden Iron Mine Company and in time it was wholly owned to people associated with Toronto when Robinson sold his share to Henry Stark Howland who lived there. By 1874 the town was growing, with a post office and general store. At the time, everything travelled in and out by wagon on Monck Road.

Businessmen in Toronto were becoming interested in capturing some of this traffic for themselves, as well as providing transport for goods they were personally interested in. The first attempt was backed by William Gooderham, Sr., James Gooderham Wortss and Henry Pellatt, who chartered the Toronto and Nipissing Railway (T&N) in 1869 to build a narrow gauge line with the ultimate aim of reaching the Ottawa Valley. After opening as far as Uxbridge in 1871, the contractor walked away from the job, leaving the partially completed line to Coboconk. With the T&N stalled, in 1874, George Laidlaw, who had been instrumental in setting up the T&N, chartered the competing Victoria Railway with roughly the same goals. The Victoria likewise ran out of money after reaching Haliburton late in 1878.

=== Myles Branch Tramway ===
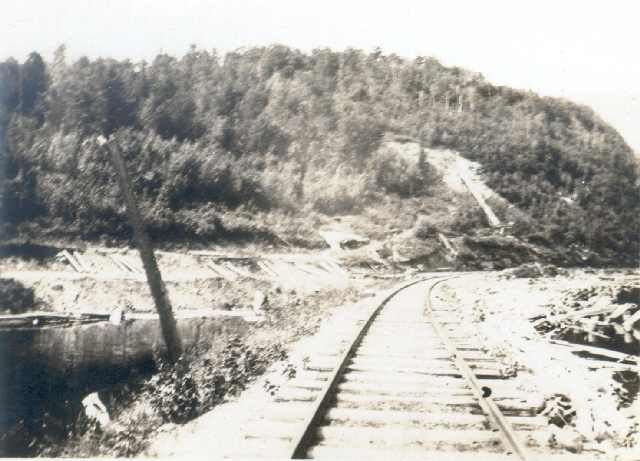
The IB&O mainline is seen passing Old Baptiste Mine just west of Baptiste Lake.

William Myles, "an Irish born coal dealer from Toronto", purchased a share of the Snowdon and began plans to build a railway connection to the Victoria, a little over 6 miles (9.7 km) from the smelters that had been built at Furnace Falls on the Irondale River in 1874. Myles started construction in 1876 (Note: There is considerable disagreement between Wilkins and most other sources about key dates in the IB&O story. Wilkins has most events taking place in the early 1880s, while every other source places it a few years earlier in the late 1870s.) using squared logs supporting horse drawn sledges. (Note: According to Wilkins, Miles attempted to run locomotives on the rails, but they so damaged the wood that they abandoned the attempt.)

Myles borrowed the required $60,000 from the Canadian Bank of Commerce, using the mines as security. The wagonway finally opened in 1878 as the Myles Branch Tramway. The interchange with the Victoria, about 2.5 miles (4.0 km) north of Kinmount, became known as Myles Junction. In 1878, Myles shipped 1000 tonnes of ore, and then abandoned the properties.

In 1879 Charles Pusey and his partner Ivatts purchased both the Snowdon and Howland's mines, only to have Ivatts leave for Europe a short time later. Pusey then formed a partnership with Howland, an influential Toronto businessman who had been a founding director of both the Canadian Bank of Commerce and the Imperial Bank of Canada. Both men were interested in railways, and became friends, and later family when Howland's son married Pusey's daughter.

To improve operations, Pusey and Howland chartered the Snowdon Branch Railway to upgrade the Tramway as a true railway. (Note: Wilkins (apparently incorrectly) suggests the entire operation was under Myles through the period from 1878 to 1880. He never mentions the name "Snowdon Branch".) They eventually abandoned the mines and sold them to Parry and Mills from Chicago. Perry and Mills began construction of a pig iron upgrading furnace and then ran out of money, only to have much of it burn down in 1881. Pusey and Howland were able to purchase the remains and form the Toronto Iron Company.

=== IB&O ===
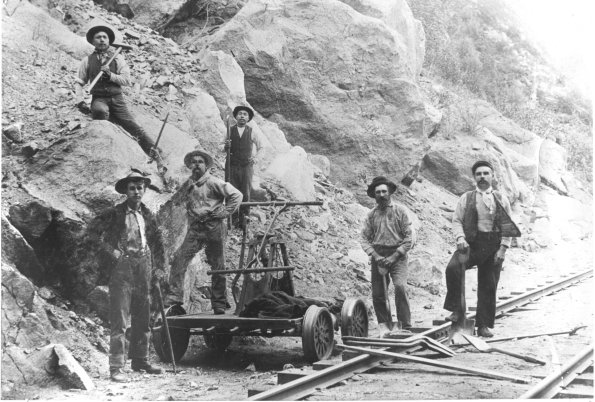
Building the IB&O was not a simple prospect and required considerable rock cutting.

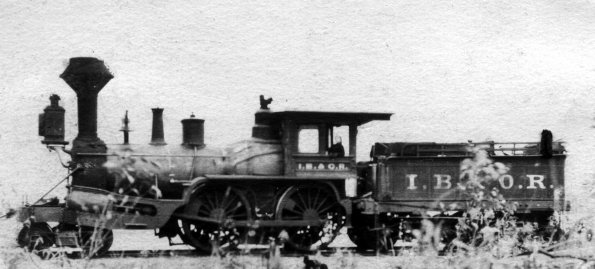
IB&O Engine #1 was nicknamed "Mary Anne" after the engineer's wife.

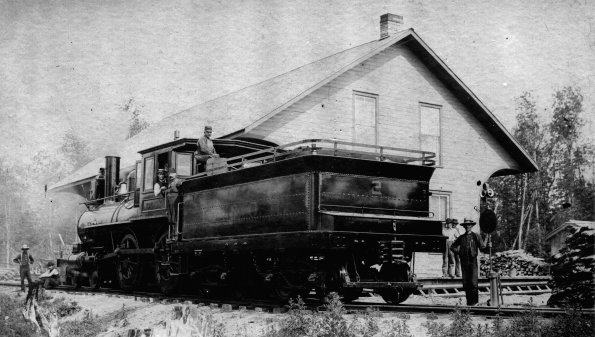
This surprisingly high quality image from 1895 shows engine #2 at Wilberforce.

On 5 March 1880, Pusey and Howland chartered the Toronto and Nipissing Eastern Extension Railway, with the plan to complete the original T&L route at least as far as the Snowdon Branch and other local mines, and then extend to connect to the Canada Central Railway near Ottawa. However, a downturn in the iron market that year led to the plans being shelved. In the fall of 1881 the T&N began expansion plans of its own, surveying the rest of the route to Lake Nipissing. However, in December of that year the T&L amalgamated with the Midland Railway of Canada, ending any expansion plans. When the T&LEE shareholders met for the first time on 31 January 1883, nothing much happened.

On 25 March 1884, the two rechartered the line as the IB&O, this time planning to use the Snowdon Branch Railway as the basis for a new line running from Orillia to Ottawa, a distance of about 225 miles (362 km), with options to build branches northeast to Sault Saint Marie and west-southwest to Brockville. This saw more favourable response from the shareholders, and in 1883 Pusey began surveying the route as far as Bancroft. Notices were placed in November 1884 for construction contacts for this 50 miles (80 km) section. A contract was signed with the Hudson Improvement Company on 15 February 1886.

In November 1886 the IB&O officially purchased the Myles Branch Tramway for $500 and a note for $22,000 due in 12 months. The Bank of Commerce mortgaged the property to the IB&O to provide funding to lay the rails. A $17,710 contract was placed with Cooper, Fairman & Co in Montreal to supply 56 pound rails, with $8,800 of that to be paid when they received their government subsidies after laying the first 10 miles (16 km) of rail. The line was opened in February 1887, including the original 6.75 miles of the Tramway, and an extension to Devil's Creek, which they rechristened Irondale, bringing it to a total of 10 miles. They began operations with two 4-4-0 locomotives purchased from the Grand Trunk Railway.

According to one story, the railway was required to reach the town of Gooderham by a certain date in 1886. However, they ran out of rails short of the goal. To solve the problem they loaded a train with ties and rails and started building off the existing endpoint, and then moving the train forward onto the new rails. The rails were then lifted behind the train and placed in front, allowing it to move forward again. In this leapfrog fashion they reached Gooderham and claimed the bonus, but left the train abandoned until further supplies arrived.

In April 1887 the company began raising the $9,000,000 that would be required to complete the line from Orillia to Ottawa. Most of this was funded by a $3,750,000 bond issue, although no one outside the existing shareholders purchased any of them. The line joking became known as the "IOU Railway". $450,000 of the bonds were used as collateral for loans obtained from J.H. Plummer and Zebulon Aiton Lash, business associates of Howland. Further expansion was funded by Pusey himself, with the line reaching another 20 miles (32 km) to Wilberforce on 23 November 1893, and another 10 miles to Baptiste in January 1897. By late 1898 the line was at Redmond Bay of Baptiste Lake, only a few miles from Bancroft.

=== CNoR takeover ===
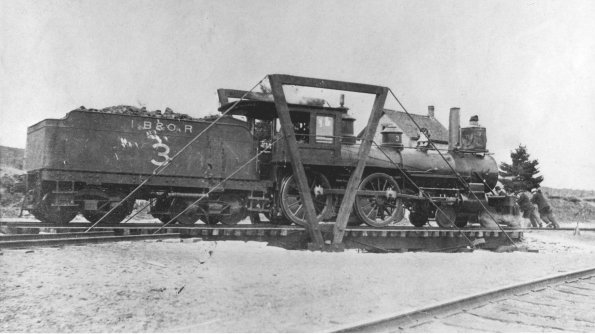
Engine #3 is turned on the Myles Junction turntable.

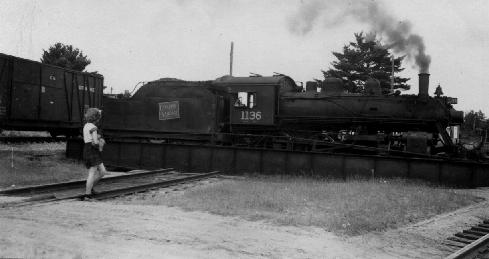
CNoR engine 1136 being turned at Irondale. This engine kept its number after the CN takeover.

The railway reached new mining areas just as it was being discovered that the ore had a high sulphur content, which made it difficult to refine. Combined with lower prices in the market, the railway found little profit in the iron business. By this time, woodcutting was reaching a peak in Ontario and the railway found considerable business servicing various sawmills that were springing up in the area.

Pusey's death on 18 July 1899 left Lash as the executor of his estate. Lash was the General Manager of Bank of Commerce, who held most of the debt for the line, and was also a lawyer for Mackenzie and Mann's CNoR. He officially took over the IB&O in 1905. In April 1906 CNoR leased the COR, and soon made a bid for the IB&O as well. Lash urged all shareholders to accept, and CNoR took over operations of the IB&O on 16 October 1906.

By this time, the COR had opened its line to Bancroft in December 1900, and was continuing north with its own plans to connect to Ottawa via the Ottawa, Arnprior and Parry Sound Railway. This made the original plans for the IB&O superfluous. CNoR provided the funding needed for the remaining 5 kilometres (3.1 mi) from Mud Creek to York River, where the IB&O connected with the COR just north of Bancroft on 1 July 1910. The first through train ran the complete route on 12 September.

Mackenzie and Mann purchased the IB&O outright, and then used it to lease the COR in 1910. In 1911, CNoR officially purchased the IB&O, putting both lines under the CNoR name. (Note: Some sources say it was the IB&O that leased the COR, but this appears to be in error.) The IB&O had been cheaply built and was subject to constant derailments, so the CNoR began upgrading the line while limiting speeds along considerable lengths to only 15 miles per hour (24 km/h). In spite of this, the route was so much more direct that the passenger trip from Bancroft to Toronto was cut to a single day. In 1919, Myles Junction was renamed Howland Junction.

=== CN years ===
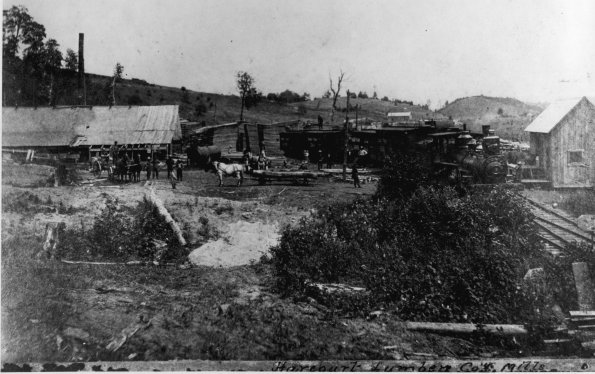
Harcourt Lumber was a major customer for the IB&O, who constructed a siding to service them. This site operated well into the CN years.

Canadian Northern completed its transcontinental line to the Pacific on 23 January 1915, producing a network reaching across the country. Unfortunately the cost of completing the line was enormous, as was the cost of the Mount Royal Tunnel, leaving the company saddled with debts. It also had to compete with two other transcontinental railways, Canadian Pacific and the Grand Trunk Pacific Railway, the later of which reached the Pacific in 1914 and had already discovered there was not enough traffic to share with the CP, let alone a third entrant.

The CNoR was unable to pay its debts, and approached the government looking for a bailout. Instead, the government took over the company in 1916, merged it with the Canadian Government Railways, and then renamed it all Canadian National Railways in 1918. Service continued as the Irondale Subdivision. (Note: Note that CN counted miles from the Y Road west toward Howland Junction, reversing the earlier numbering.)

=== Abandonment ===
The route was little used for much of its history, and the entire line was abandoned on 31 March 1960. A short section west of the wye connection with the COR was used as a spur line to the local Domtar flakeboard plant. The remainder had its rails lifted starting in July 1960.

== Description ==
=== Route ===
The IB&O ran roughly eastward out of Myles Junction to Furnace Falls, where it turned almost north to a point just short of Irondale. At Irondale it crosses the Irondale River to the north bank. It then runs roughly northeast all the way to Harcourt. At Harcourt the line turns more east-northeast to Hughes, and then east to the final connection with the COR north of Bancroft. A siding split off the line at Furnace Falls to serve the mine, but this was lifted around 1900 when the mine closed, and became a road to White Lake. (Note: Although many of the references mention the branch line to the mines, there is no actual description of it in the station listings, nor does it appear on any IB&O maps.)

The line spent most of its history ending at Mud Creek, with Baptiste as the major yard site. Here was a station with engine shed, turntable, shops, water tower and coaling yard. There were manually pushed turntables at Myles Junction, Mud Creek and Irondale. After its linking to the COR, the maintenance area was moved to Bancroft.

=== Stations and stops ===
Taken from Wilkins, which differs slightly from Cooper's similar list.

The line was originally counted from its western end at the Victoria Railway. This was initially known as Myles Junction, but was renamed Kinmount Junction and finally Howland Junction in 1919. A two-story building at this location acted as a house and waiting room, but burned down in 1917. A replacement single-story building remains at the site.

Some of the stations along the line were flag stops, but there were many complete stations as well. Irondale station was also a two-story building like the one at Kinmount, and it burned down in 1931 or 32, to be replaced by three converted boxcars. Similar stations were built at Gooderham, Wilberforce and Highland Grove.

After 1919, the service on both the IB&O and the Grand Trunk became tri-weekly Mondays, Wednesdays and Fridays, and in 1934 to Tuesdays, Thursdays and Saturdays. In 1931, divisional control of the IB&O at Belleville was transferred to Lindsay, and from 1955 trains ran from Bancroft to Lindsay on Tuesdays and Fridays, and returned on Wednesdays and Saturdays.

Name	Mile	Type	Notes
Howland Junction	0	Station	Junction with the Victoria Railway.
Conway	2.9	Flag stop	At Ron Road.
Furnace Falls	4.9	Flag stop and cargo platform	Branch point for the line to Furnace Falls, now forms White Boundary Road.
Irondale	9.3	Station	
Maxwell's (Crossing)	11.3	Flag stop	
Gooderham	16.9	Station	One of the larger stations on the route, was destroyed by a tornado in 1947. A pump powered by steam provided by the locomotives provided water from the Irondale River. A roundhouse was built in the flat area south of the tracks, along with a double-ended siding running past the station.
Tory Hill	24.7	Station	Served a bush camp for loggers from the Standard Chemical Company.
Ward	27.5	Flag stop	
Wilberforce	30.1	Station	Three sidings and a spur to the Wilberforce Graphite Mine.
Ironsides (Radium Springs)	33.5	Flag stop	At Mumford Road. Railbed now forms Cardiff Lake Road to Harcourt.
Mumford (Harcourt)	34.9	Station	Also served a local graphite mill just west of town.
Highland Grove	38.9	Station	Station burned down twice.
Baptiste	45.0	Station	Two sidings and main service depot.
Hughes	46.5	Siding	Served William Hughes' timber operations.
Redmond Bay	47.5	Station	End of the line from 1898 until 1910, turntable used as a turnaround. Shipment east from this point was carried by wagon.
York River	50.9	Junction	Junction with the COR. Railbed now forms Y Road.
Bancroft	53.7	Maintenance yard	Shared COR's maintenance yard in Bancroft after 1910.

== See also ==
- List of Ontario railways
