= Grand Junction Railway (Ontario) =

Map

The Grand Junction Railway (GJR) was a short-line railway in Ontario, Canada. It ran between Peterborough and Belleville. It was originally designed to be a loop, starting near Toronto and running northeast to Peterborough, then southeast to meet the Grand Trunk Railway (GTR) on the banks of Lake Ontario. By the time it had been built other lines had run into Toronto, so the GJR instead ran from Belleville to Peterborough, and then to Omemee where it met the Midland Railway of Canada. Just north of its starting point, the wholly owned subsidiary Belleville and North Hastings Railway branched off for the mining areas around Madoc, meeting the Central Ontario Railway just outside Eldorado.

== History ==
=== Background ===
With the construction of the Grand Trunk Railway between Toronto and Montreal in the early 1850s, the possibility was created for communities along the Grand Trunk's Lake Ontario shoreline route to become significant rail junctions for interchange traffic with possible new railways into the interior. The rapidly industrializing centre of Peterborough was a significant target for a series of proposed shortline railways, as it was mainly connected to the outside world through waterways.

The first of these shortlines was the ill-fated Cobourg and Peterborough Railway. The idea of Cobourg as the lakeshore terminus of a railway went as far back as 1834, with a plan for a line from Cobourg to Rice Lake. Even before the Grand Trunk, the port at Cobourg provided an opportunity to export natural resources from Central Ontario via Lake Ontario without navigating certain parts of the river system. A modified version of this plan would be revived in 1852, with a new northern terminus at Peterborough. The Cobourg and Peterborough line was built along a former plank road (an earlier attempt at a connection between the two centres) and suffered from significant problems related to seasonal ice

The second such line had its terminus further west, at neighbouring Port Hope. This was the Port Hope, Lindsay and Beaverton Railway. Cobourg and Port Hope were fiercely competitive, and a railway from Port Hope to Peterborough had been planned for years. A revival of these plans in the 1850s, however, saw the railway bypass Peterborough and cut ambitiously to the west, aiming for Lake Simcoe and Georgian Bay. It reached Lindsay by 1857, and in 1858, a branch line to Peterborough was built from a junction at Millbrook (the Millbrook Branch), providing direct competition to the Cobourg and Peterborough Railway at a time when it was seriously struggling with infrastructure problems. A bridge collapse in 1861 effectively terminated through traffic on the Cobourg and Peterborough line, restricting rail service to Peterborough to only operate via the Millbrook Branch – a branch line of a shortline – eliminating the direct connection to the Grand Trunk mainline at Cobourg.

=== Merger and later history ===
The GJR was one of five struggling short lines merged into the Midland Railway in April 1882. Midland, in turn, was leased by the GTR in 1884 and acquired outright in 1893. The line was used for passengers into the 1960s and freight until the 1980s, but was abandoned starting in 1987. The first portion between Corbyville and Peterborough was lifted that year, followed by the section between Peterborough and Lindsay in 1990.

Like many historical railways in Ontario, the route of the GJR is now used as a recreational trail.

== See also ==
- List of Ontario railways
