= Central Ontario Railway =

Former railway in Ontario, Canada

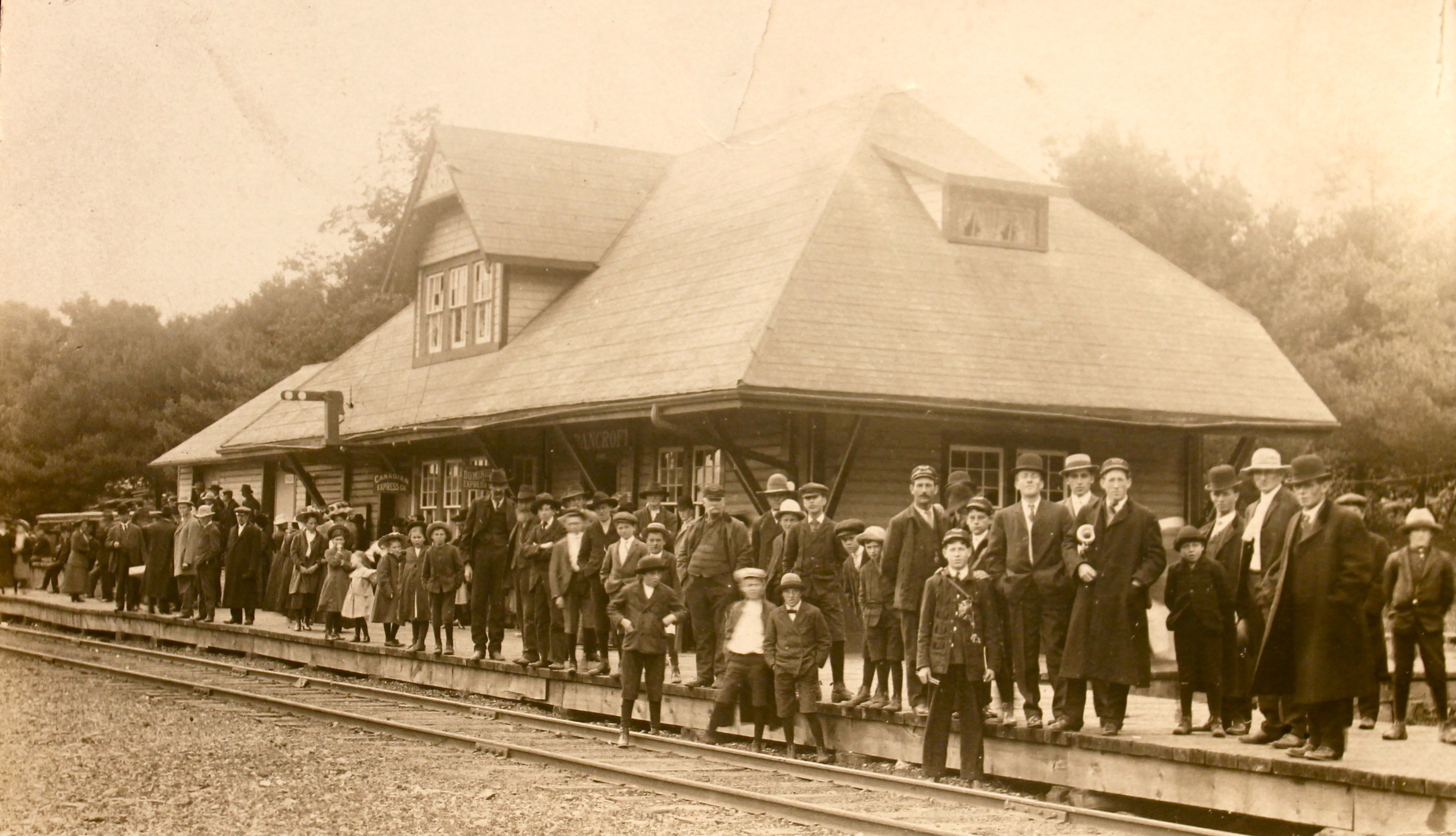
- A crowd gathers on the Central Ontario Railway platform in Bancroft to await the arrival of the first train on 2 November 1900.

Overview
- Headquarters: Maynooth
- Reporting mark: COR
- Locale: Ontario, Canada
- Dates of operation: 1879–1984
- Predecessor: Prince Edward County Railway
- Successor: Canadian Northern Railway

Technical
- Length: 50.9 miles (81.9 km)

The Central Ontario Railway (COR) was a railway that ran north from Trenton, Ontario to service a number of towns, mines, and sawmills. It was formed as the Prince Edward County Railway in 1879, and ran between Picton and Trenton, where it connected with the Grand Trunk Railway that ran between Montreal and Toronto. After being purchased by a group of investors and receiving a new charter to build northward, the company was renamed the Central Ontario Railway in 1882, and it started building towards the gold fields at Eldorado and newly discovered iron fields in Coe Hill.

On reaching Coe Hill in 1884, the mine was found to have low-grade ore, nearly bankrupting the company. Expansion continued to other mining areas around Bancroft, along with two-wholly owned subsidiary lines, the Ontario, Belmont and Northern Railway, later known as the Marmora Railway, and the Bessemer and Barry's Bay Railway. The later was supposed to connect to the Ottawa, Arnprior and Parry Sound Railway (OA&PS) at Barry's Bay, but those plans were shelved. A new route to the OA&PS was selected to Whitney, just outside Algonquin Provincial Park. Construction on the final portion reached Maynooth in 1907 but was never completed, and the line ended in the now-abandoned town of Wallace, about 25 km south of Whitney.

The COR was taken over by Mackenzie and Mann in 1910, along with the Irondale, Bancroft and Ottawa Railway which was connected to the COR north of Bancroft in July 1910. Both lines were then merged into their Canadian Northern Railway (CNoR) in 1911. After CNoR was nationalized 1918, the lines became part of the Canadian National Railway (CN) in 1923. CN operated the COR as the Maynooth Subdivision. Sections of the line north of Maynooth were lifted in 1965, and the entire rest of the line in 1985. All of the side branches had been abandoned much earlier, typically when the ore deposits dried up.

Much of the route of the COR has been repurposed as a multiuse recreational rail trail, which has a variety of names depending on its location, with the Hastings Heritage Trail being a prominent part.

== History ==
=== Prince Edward County Railway ===
Prince Edward County is a large peninsula on eastern Lake Ontario. It is roughly triangular in shape with its apex pointed to the east, and its connection to the mainland at the northwestern corner. It was first settled starting in 1784 by Loyalists after the American Revolutionary War, and depended largely on fishing and barley in its early days.

The Grand Trunk Railway (GTR) reached Belleville on its way to Toronto in 1855, opening new markets to the county. Local businessmen began considering a railway to collect produce from across the peninsula and connecting with the GTR at Trenton, on the north side of the land bridge with the mainland. The Prince Edward County Railway company (PECR) was formed in 1873 (Note: Sources disagree on the date, some suggesting that it was formed in 1879 and opened in 1880, while others give 1873 as the formation and 1879 as the opening date.) and began construction due west out of Picton towards the western shore of the peninsula, then turning northward for Trenton. Due to financial constraints, the line was not completed until 1879, and it opened for service in October. In 1976 a large branch was wyed off west of Picton to serve large quarries north of town, near Elmbrook.

=== Expansion to Coe Hill ===
The opening of Central Ontario during the 19th Century was driven primarily by the discovery of a number of mineral deposits, notably gold and iron ore. As mines grew, principally in the area of Marmora and Madoc, a race formed between a series of railways companies which wanted to serve these markets. Among the many claimants were the Victoria Railway (VicR) that ran through Lindsay, a combined rail and water route by the Cobourg and Peterborough Railway (C&P), and a potential extension of the Toronto and Nipissing Railway. None of these were well placed though, as they ran towards Toronto instead of east to the major markets and shipping routes. The only line that appeared to be well positioned was a proposed branch of the Grand Junction Railway (GJR) out of Belleville. Since the new mining areas were directly north of both Trenton and Belleville, the PERC was also in an ideal location as a starting point.

William Coe of Madoc found iron ore deposits outside Brinklow and began looking for ways to commercialize the find. He contacted George William McMullen, a railway promoter in Chicago who had been born and raised in Picton. McMullen started looking for partners, and found Samuel Ritchey, a businessman from Ohio who was looking for new ventures. Rickey, McMullen and McMullen's brother J.B. bought the PECR in 1880 to serve as the basis for a rapid expansion. In 1881 the group purchased 70,000 acres of land for the mines, and transferred the deeds to the company. The group then petitioned the Ontario Legislature for the rights to rename the company and start construction northward, which was granted on 10 March 1882. The land deeds were transferred to the newly formed Coe Hill Mining Company, and the railway was renamed the Central Ontario Railway.

The route was selected to take the line through several other mining areas, including Marmora, Deloro and Malone, before reaching Eldorado. The line reached Marmora in 1883 and the newly formed Coe Hill in 1884. (Note: Most sources agree this took place in 1884, either directly or by saying "two years later" after formation of the company in 1882. One source states Coe Hill was not reached until 1889, but this appears to be an error.) The first load of ore left the station on 2 June 1884, but when the samples reached Cleveland for analysis the results showed that the ore was too low grade to be useful for mining, leaving the company on the verge of bankruptcy.

=== Further routes and branches ===
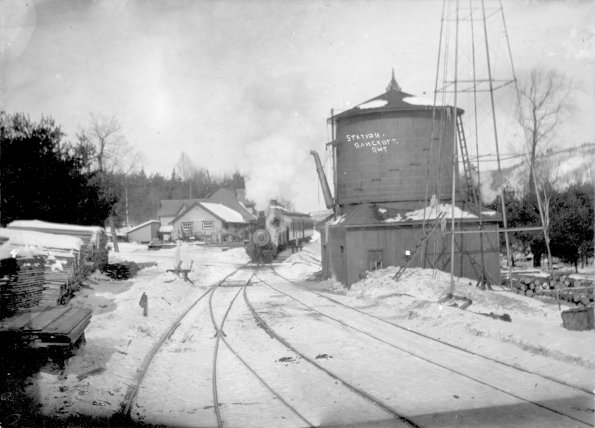
A Canadian Northern Railway (CNoR) passenger train heads south out of Bancroft station in 1910.

From that point the company turned to servicing other mines and sawmills in the area and constructed a number of branch lines. As early as May 1891, the Ontario, Belmont & Northern Railway (OB&NR), a wholly owned subsidiary of the COR, received a charter to build a branch line to the iron mines in the Marmora area. Construction did not start for some time, and the 14.5 km line from Marmora Junction near Belmar to the Cordova mines was finally completed in July 1896. Later that year the branch was renamed to become the Marmora Railway & Mining Company.

Starting in 1899 the mainline was extended further north, not from the original terminus in Coe Hill which became a branch line, but by via a wye off the line south of Brinklow and running almost due north from that point, roughly following the route of the modern Ontario Highway 62. The 19.55 mile extension to Bancroft opened on 2 November 1900. Another subsidiary line, the Bessemer and Barry's Bay Railway, was chartered in 1904 (although apparently formed in the late 1800s) to branch off the COR at L'Amable, just south of Bancroft, and run eastward to connect to Bessemer and the Child's Mine. Later, plans were made to use this branch as the basis for an extension all the way to the Ottawa, Arnprior and Parry Sound Railway, at that time the busiest railway in Canada, meeting it at Barry's Bay. However, the extension plans were never taken up and the B&BB remained a spur ending Child's Mine.

A connection with the OA&PS, by this time reorganized to become part of the Canadian Atlantic Railway (CAR), remained desirable. A new route running from the Bancroft terminus was selected, running almost due north to meet the CAR near Whitney, just outside today's Algonquin Provincial Park. Construction on this link reached Maynooth on 7 November 1907, Lake St. Peter in 1909, and Wallace in 1911 - so-named for the line's surveyor and chief engineer. By this time the logging era had reached its peak and traffic was dwindling on the COR, and further expansion was abandoned, leaving the end of the line a turnaround-wye next to Joseph Lavalley's farm in Wallace.

=== Leasing, purchase and abandonment ===
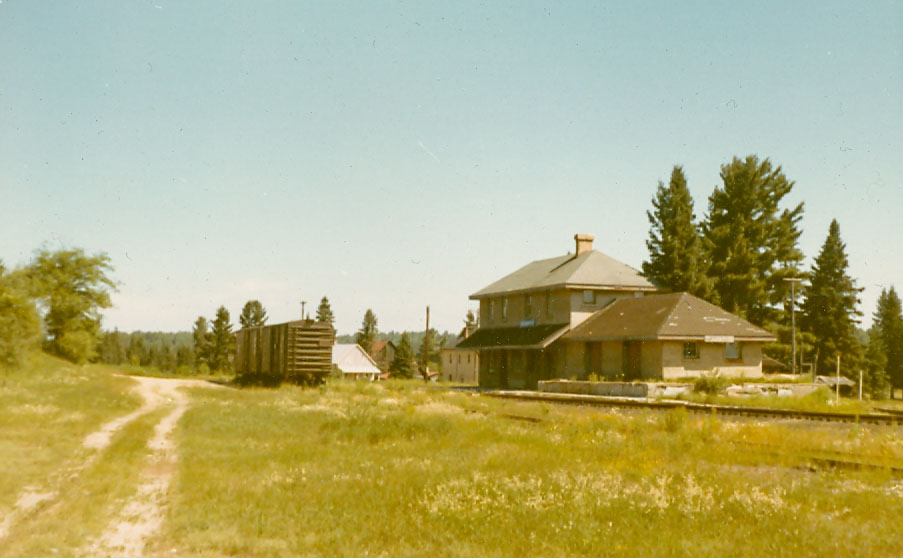
By the time this photo was taken in 1971, the COR north of Maynooth had been abandoned and the section north of Bancroft was little used. Maynooth station is already in shabby condition.

In 1910 the entire COR was leased by the Irondale, Bancroft and Ottawa Railway, which was itself purchased by the Canadian Northern Railway (CNoR) in 1911. The Canadian government took control of the CNoR in 1916, and folded its holdings into the forming Canadian National Railway (CNR) in 1918. Under CN ownership, various sections were renamed as subdivisions; the line from Picton to Trenton became the Picton Subdivision, the mainline to Maynooth became the Maynooth Subdivision, while the various spurs became the Coe Hill Subdivision, the Marmora Subdivision, and the Bessemer Subdivision.

The line was kept active by a series of small lumber mills that opened in the Lake McKenzie area. McConnell's Mill near the current intersection of McKenzie Lake Road and Ontario Highway 127 was the first of these, and later taken over by the Rathbun Lumber Company. Judson Gunters opened a mill slightly to the north around 1918, which gives its name to maps to this day. The final mill in the area opened in 1943 when J.S.L. McRae moved his mill from Lake of Two Rivers in Algonquin to the area just north of Wallace. This mill operated until 1952.

With the closing of the McRae mill and several other businesses in the area, traffic on the northern section of the line quickly dwindled. By 1955 all the business in Wallace had closed, and the COR ran a single train to the town every Wednesday to deliver mail. This section was abandoned in 1960, leaving the terminus at Lake St. Peter. On 22 April 1964 CNR applied to abandon the entire line from Wallace to Bird's Creek, just north of Bancroft where the COR met the Irondale (at today's "Y" Road). But only a smaller section, from Maynooth to Lake St. Peter was abandoned in 1965, along with most of the spurs. The remainder of the line was abandoned by CNR in 1984, and the rails lifted either that year or the next. Today only a 1.5 km long section of the line remains, used by CN Rail as a siding to service the grain terminal at Trenton junction.

=== Conversion to rail-trail ===
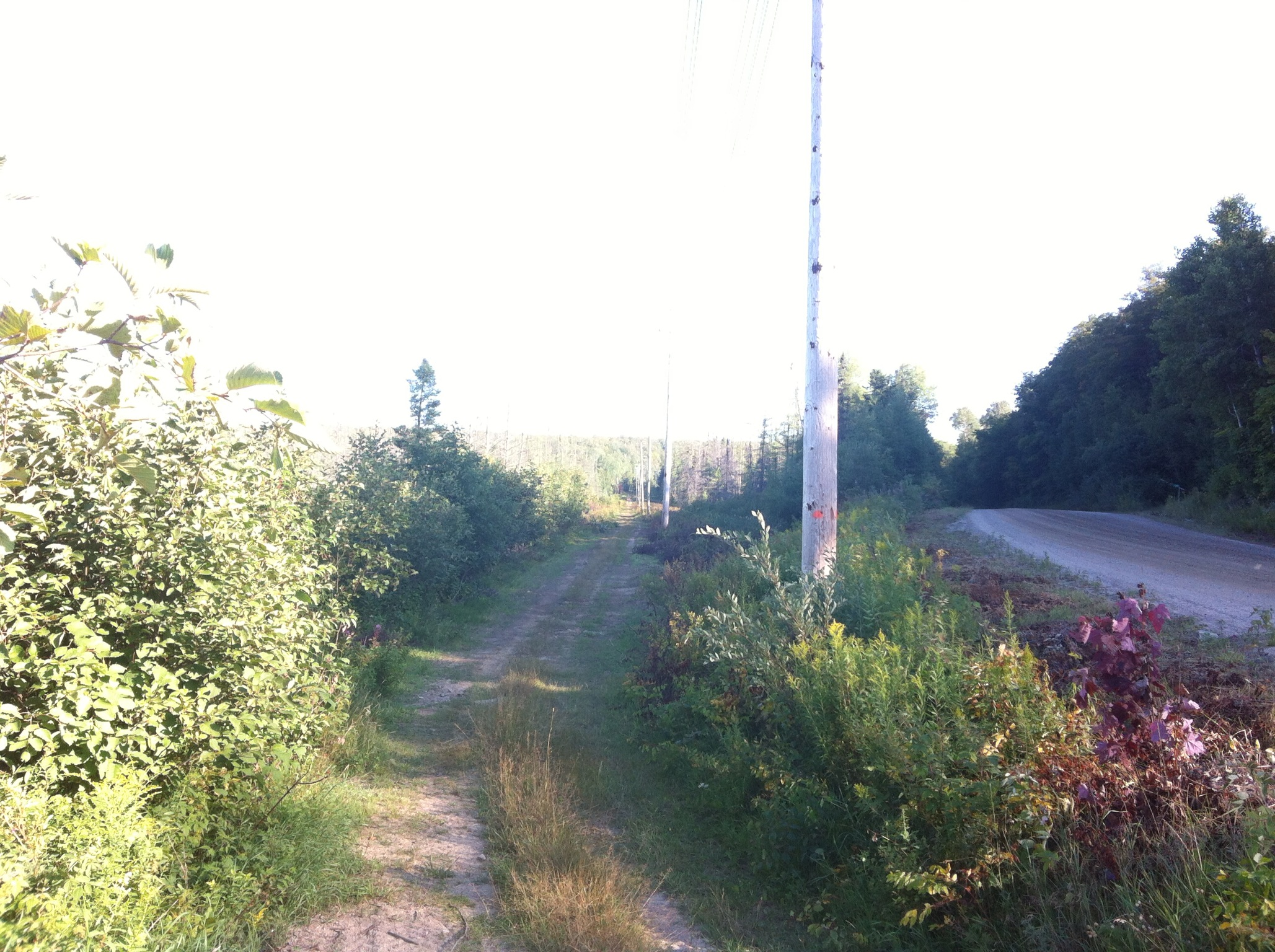
Looking south from the northernmost "navigable" point of the COR, at the ghost town of Gunters.

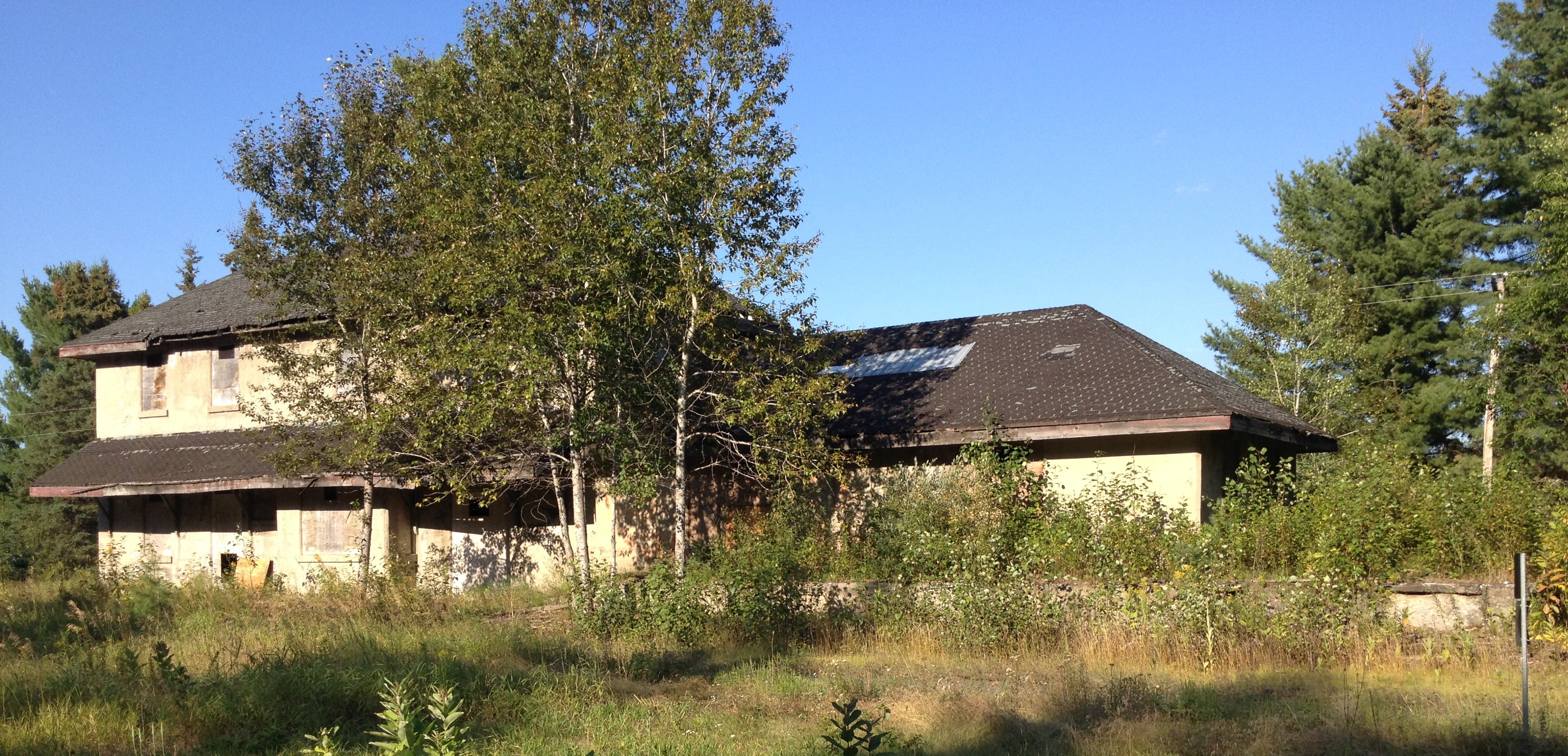
Maynooth Station on the COR, about 2 km east of the town of Maynooth, Ontario. The station was the northernmost major station on the Central Ontario Railway.

Most of the COR, including the original PECR route, has been converted to rail-trail use. After its abandonment the line has increasingly been turned to local authorities for maintenance.

The route of the original PECR was purchased by Prince Edward County in 1997 and is now known as the Millennium Trail, running for 49 km out of Picton and ending just outside Trenton.

The 17 km section between Ontario Highway 401 at Trenton and Glen Ross had been re-used for roadways and other uses, as well as being in a built-up area. The unused sections in this area only started conversion to trail use in the 2000s, and several of these sections opened in 2011. Just north of Trenton this is known as the Jack Lange Memorial Trail, and from there, from just south of Glen Miller to Glen Ross, it becomes the Lower Trent Trail.

The largest section of the trail network is the 156-kilometre (97 mi) long four-season Hastings Heritage Trail, stretching from Glen Ross all the way to Lake St. Peter Provincial Park outside Maynooth. This is the official end of the line, where it hits the border between Hastings County and South Algonquin. The trail remains in good repair, signed and used, north of this border to its current ending point near McKenzie Lake, at the intersection of McKenzie Lake Road and McKenzie North Road, marked on many maps as the village of Gunters.

The short remaining section from Gunters to Wallace is used for a variety of purposes, including section of McKenzie Lake Road, Hydro One lines providing local service, and in some areas simply abandoned and heavily overgrown. The ultimate terminus can be seen a few meters to the west of McKenzie Lake Road at the ghost town of Wallace.

== Route ==
This map, from the COR's June 1910 passenger timetable, shows the route running all the way to Whitney. It actually ended near the "Y" in "RAILWAY", in Sabine County.

The original Prince Edward County Railway ran almost due west out of Picton towards the western shore of the Prince Edward County peninsula. It turned northwest at Wellington and then due north at Hillier before turning northwest again at Consecon to loop around the western end of the Bay of Quinte and then northeast for the short remaining distance to Trenton. There were ten stations on the line, Picton, Bloomfield at 4.22 miles, Hallowell 7.59 miles, Wellington 10.97 miles, Niles' Corner 14.90 miles, Hillier 16.55 miles, Consecon 21.32 miles, Weller's Bay 25.64 miles, Canal 27.02 miles and Trenton 30.60 miles. This section of the line was abandoned in 1984 and the rails removed, but now the majority is used for a recreational trail. The original Picton Station is located on Main Street, and is occupied by C.F. Evans Lumber Company.

From Trenton the line ran almost due north through Frankford, Glen Ross, Anson, Bonariaw, Marmora Station (just northeast of Marmora) and Deloror. Here it turned northeast toward Malone, and then east through Madoc to Eldorado. The line then turned north to run through Bannockburn, Millbridge Station and Gilmour, before turning west just south of Brinklow and running through Ormsby to its end just southwest of Coe Hill.

The Bancroft extension wyed off near Brinklow at Ormsby Junction, running north through Brinklow and detouring to the east en route to serve Detlor before reaching Bancroft. The next extension took it north from Bancroft to Maynooth Station (east of Maynooth). The original plans would have had it run roughly northeast along the route of Ontario Highway 62 to Barry's Bay, but instead took it northward along the route of Ontario Highway 127 through Lake St. Peter Provincial Park before ultimately ending in the bush near McKenzie Lake.

There were two main spur lines. One split just south of Marmora at Belmar Station to run northwest to Cordova Mines, and the other split at Bessemer Junction near Detlor running east-northeast to Childs Mine.

The COR was joined by several other railways in the area. The Grand Junction Railway (GJR) ran between Peterborough and Belleville and met the COR in a wye junction just outside the town of Anson, near Stirling. A branch of the GJR, the Belleville and North Hastings Railway (B&NH), later met the COR about 1 km west of Eldorado. The Bay of Quinte Railway was extended to meet the COR just north of Eldorado at Bannockburn, reaching this point in 1902. The final connection was to the Irondale, Bancroft and Ottawa which met the COR just north of Bancroft in 1910, meeting it at what it today known as "Y" Road, named for the wye intersection.

Main stations on the line included Picton, Bloomfield, Wellington, Trenton, Frankford, Marmora, Coe Hill, Bancroft and Maynooth. Several stations have survived; the original Picton station was moved and became a private home, while the second station remains in use as a lumberyard (C.F. Evans). Hallowell was moved to Stanley Street in Bloomfield as a children's playhouse, Bloomfield moved to West Lake as a summer residence, Consecon is abandoned in place, Frankford moved to Stockdale as a restaurant, Marmora and Coe Hill both moved to a park to become information centres (Marmora Memorial Park and Coe Hill Fairgrounds), Bancroft's station remains in place and is now municipal offices, Maynooth was abandoned in place (see image at top) and Lake St. Peter was moved to an unknown location.

== See also ==
- Maynooth Railway Station
- List of Ontario railways
- List of defunct Canadian railways
