= William Renwick Riddell =

Canadian lawyer, judge, and historian

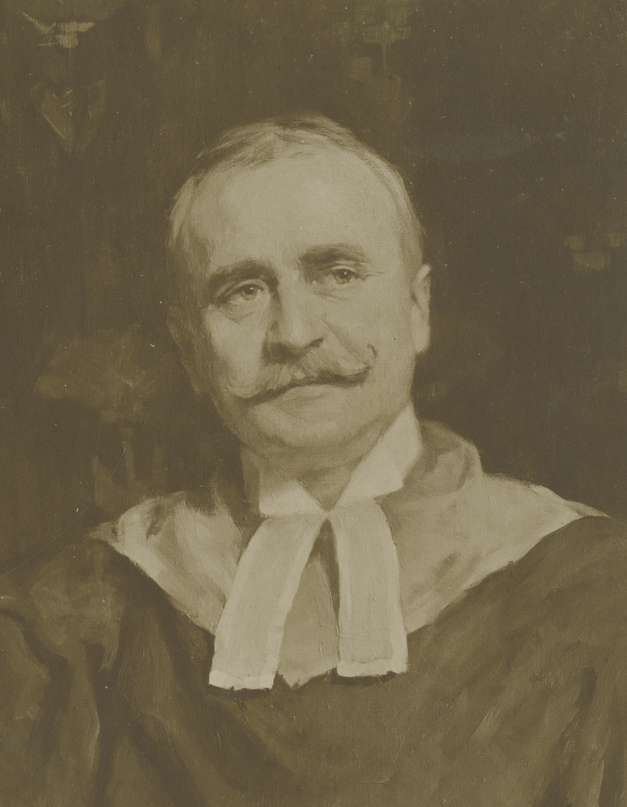

Justice of the Supreme Court of Ontario
- In office 1906–1925

Justice of the Court of Appeal for Ontario
- In office 1925–1945

Personal details
- Born: 6 April 1852 Hamilton Township, Canada West
- Died: 18 February 1945 (aged 92) Toronto, Ontario
- Spouse: Anna Crossen
- Education: Victoria College
- Occupation: Jurist, historian

William Renwick Riddell (6 April 1852 – 18 February 1945) was a Canadian lawyer, judge, and historian.

== Early life and education ==
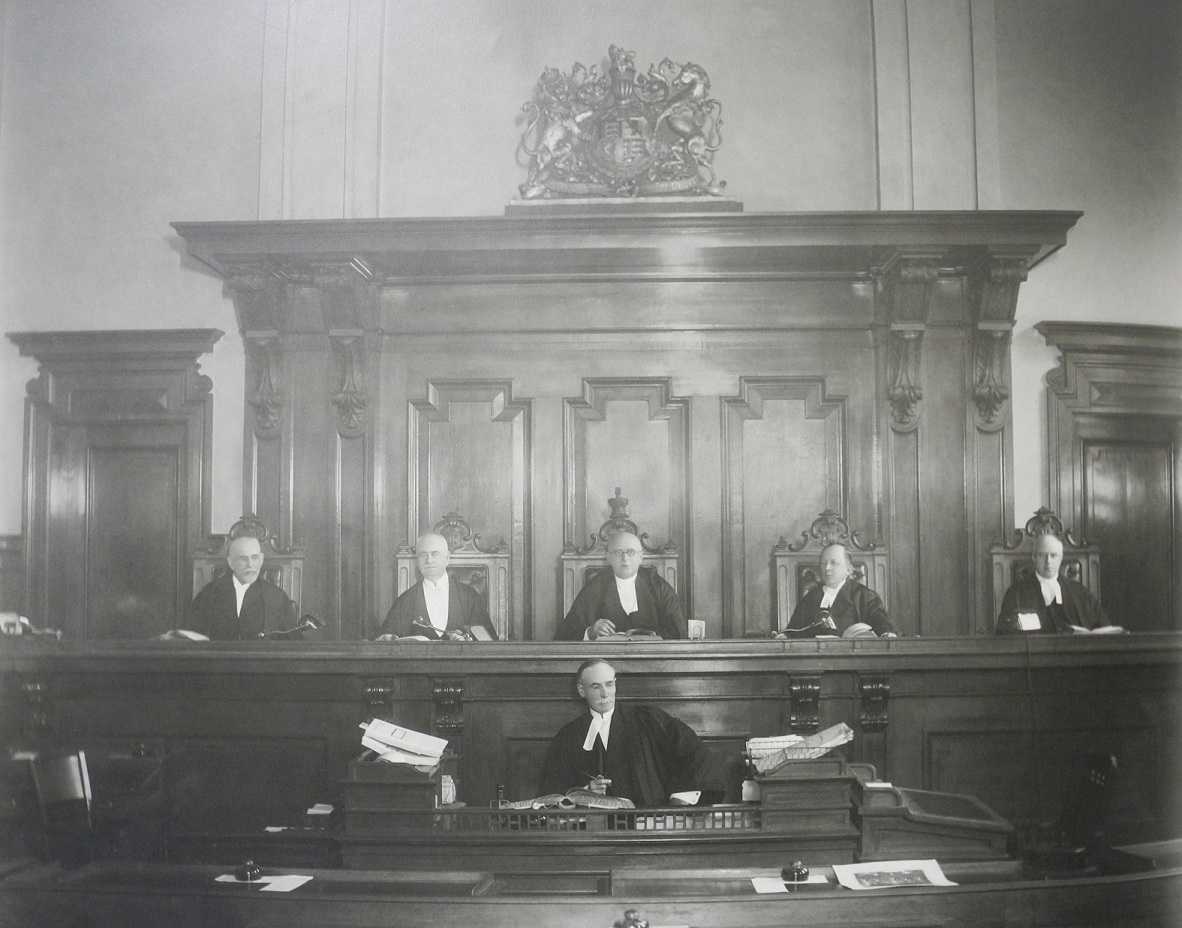
Group photograph of the justices of the Supreme Court of Ontario, Second Divisional Court. Depicted from left to right are: Justice Masten, Justice Riddell, Justice Latchford, Justice Middleton, and Justice Orde. A court clerk is seated below the bench. The photograph was taken in a courtroom at Osgoode Hall, ca. 1925

Riddell was born on 6 April 1852 in Hamilton Township, Canada West, and attended a public school in Hamilton Township, Cobourg Collegiate Institute, and Victoria College (then located in Cobourg). He received a BA from Victoria College in 1874.

== Legal career ==
Riddell was called to the bar in 1883 and conducted a law practice in Cobourg until he moved to Toronto in 1893. Riddell was named a queen's counsel in 1899. In 1892, he attempted to prevent the Law Society of Upper Canada from admitting Clara Brett Martin to the bar of Ontario.

Riddell was appointed as judge to the Supreme Court of Ontario in 1906. He was the trial judge in Sero v Gault, where Eliza Sero, a Mohawk woman, argued that her fishing net had been illegally seized by Thomas Gault, a government fisheries inspector, because the Haudenosaunee were sovereign over the land on which she lived. He dismissed Sero's claim.

He was elevated to the Court of Appeal for Ontario in 1925 and remained in office until his death in 1945.

== Writing ==
As a historian, he published numerous works of legal, medical, and social history, including biographies of William Kirby and John Graves Simcoe. Riddell wrote more than 1,200 articles on history, law, and other subjects.

Riddell was the president of Crossen Car Manufacturing Company and married Anna Crossen, daughter of the company's founder.

== Personal life and views ==
Riddell had an interest in the history of slavery in Canada and abolition, as well as the history of various Indigenous peoples. He has been criticized for holding white supremacist views related to his writing. In 1923 he wrote that "the negro refugees were superior to most of their race, for none but those with more than ordinary qualities could reach Canada." He also referred to Europeans in Canada as the "higher race" in his article about criminal law in the far north.

He was known for biting, sarcastic remarks, and was an "ardent imperialist". Riddell was not well-liked: William Mulock thought him a "terrible man", while according to John Josiah Robinette, "everyone hated the old boy".

Riddell died at his home in Toronto on 18 February 1945.

== Works ==
- Some Early Legislation and Legislators in Upper Canada (1913)
- Constitution of Canada in Its History and Practical Working (1917)
- Old Province Tales (1920)
- Travels of La Rochefoucauld in Canada 1795 (?)
- First Judge at Detroit and His Court (?)
- First Law Reporter in Upper Canada and His Reports (?)
- Magna Carta (?)
- The Legal Profession in Upper Canada in Its Early Periods (1916)
- The Life of Robert Fleming Gourlay (?)
- William Kirby (1923)
- John Richardson (c1926)
- Upper Canada Sketches (?)
- The Bar and the Courts of the Province of Upper Canada (1928)
- The Life of William Dummer Powell... (1924)
- The Life of John Graves Simcoe (1926)
- British Courts in Michigan (?)
- Michigan Under British Rule (1926)
- Joseph Willcocks: Sheriff, Member of Parliament and Traitor (1927)
- The Courts Of Ontario, (?)
- The Bar Of Ontario, (?)
- The Works of Fracastorius on Morbus Gallicus (?)
- A Philadelphia Lawyer in Canada in 1810 (?)
- Civics (?)
- The Constitution of Canada in Form and in Fact (?)
- Canadian Abridgement [edited] (?)

== Arms ==
Coat of arms of William Renwick Riddell

Crest
A demi-greyhound Proper.
Escutcheon
Argent a chevron Gules between three ears of rye slipped and bladed Proper.
Motto
I Hope To Share

== Sources ==
- Backhouse, Constance (2010). Colour-Coded: A Legal History of Racism in Canada, 1900–1950. University of Toronto Press; Osgoode Society for Canadian Legal History. ISBN 978-1-4426-8768-4. OCLC 632170342.
- Moore, Christopher (31 December 2014). The Court of Appeal for Ontario: Defining the Right of Appeal in Canada, 1792–2013. University of Toronto Press. doi:10.3138/9781442622470. ISBN 978-1-4426-2247-0. JSTOR 10.3138/j.ctt1287q35.
