= Supreme Court of Ontario =

Defunct Canadian provincial superior court

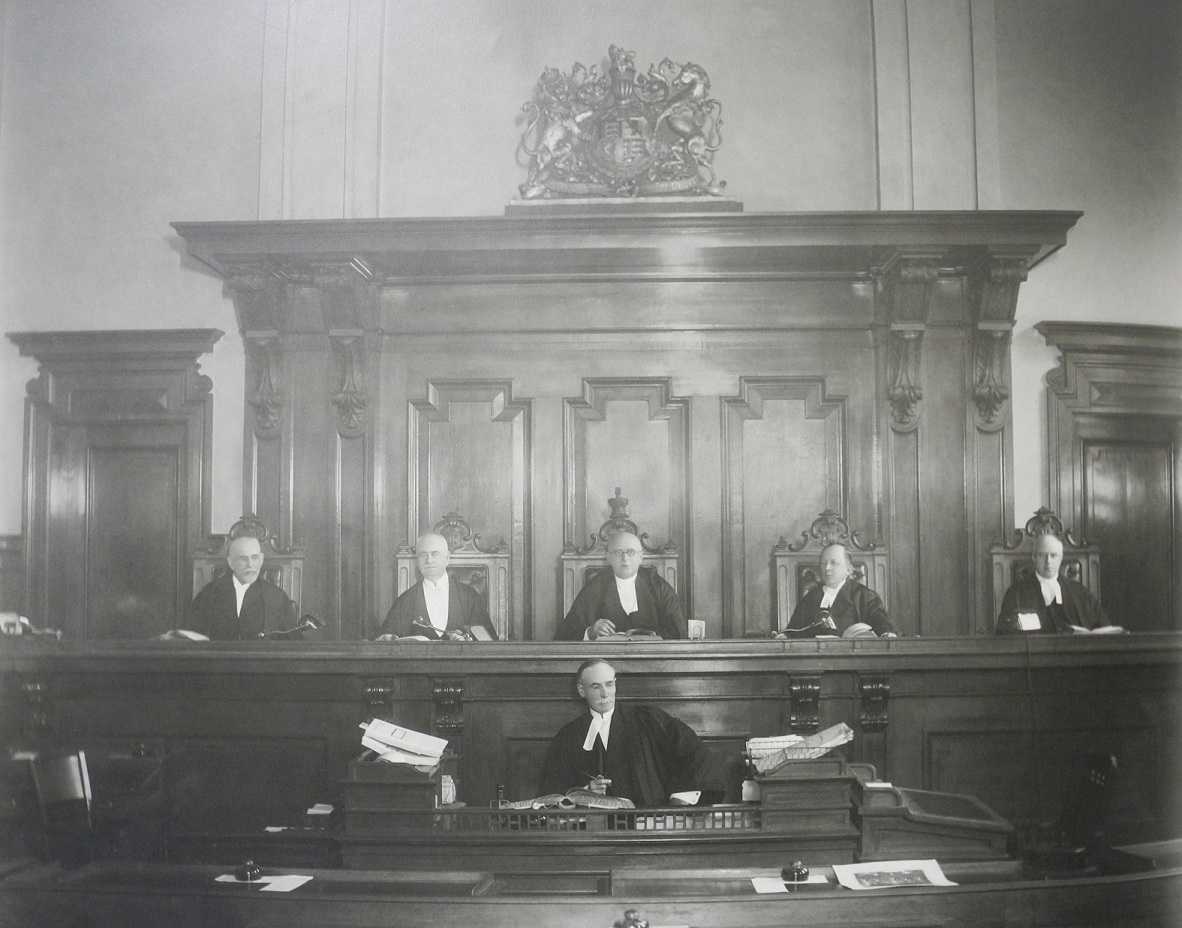
Group photograph of the justices of the Supreme Court of Ontario, Second Divisional Court. Depicted from left to right are: Justice Masten, Justice Riddell, Justice Latchford, Justice Middleton, and Justice Orde. A court clerk is seated below the bench. The photograph was taken in a courtroom at Osgoode Hall, ca. 1925

The Supreme Court of Ontario was a superior court of the Canadian province of Ontario. Created in 1881 pursuant to the Ontario Judicature Act (1881), the Supreme Court of Ontario had two branches: the High Court of Justice Division and the Appellate Division. The Supreme Court of Ontario was a Section 96 court with inherent jurisdiction.

The Appellate Division was later transformed into the Court of Appeal for Ontario.

In 1989 the Courts of Justice Amendment Act, 1989 was enacted by the Government to create one large superior trial court for Ontario. This Act came into force in 1990 and resulted in the merger of the Supreme Court (or High Court), the District Court and the Surrogate Court into the Ontario Court of Justice (General Division).

The Ontario Court (General Division) was later replaced by the Ontario Superior Court of Justice.

The court once sat at 145 Queen Street West in Toronto, now site of Four Seasons Centre.
