= Cobourg Car Works =

Canadian railway car and streetcar builder

- Company type: Subsidiary
- Industry: Rail transport
- Founded: 1873; 153 years ago
- Defunct: 1913
- Headquarters: Cobourg, Ontario, Canada
- Area served: Worldwide
- Products: Locomotives; High-speed trains Intercity and commuter trains Trams; People movers Signalling systems

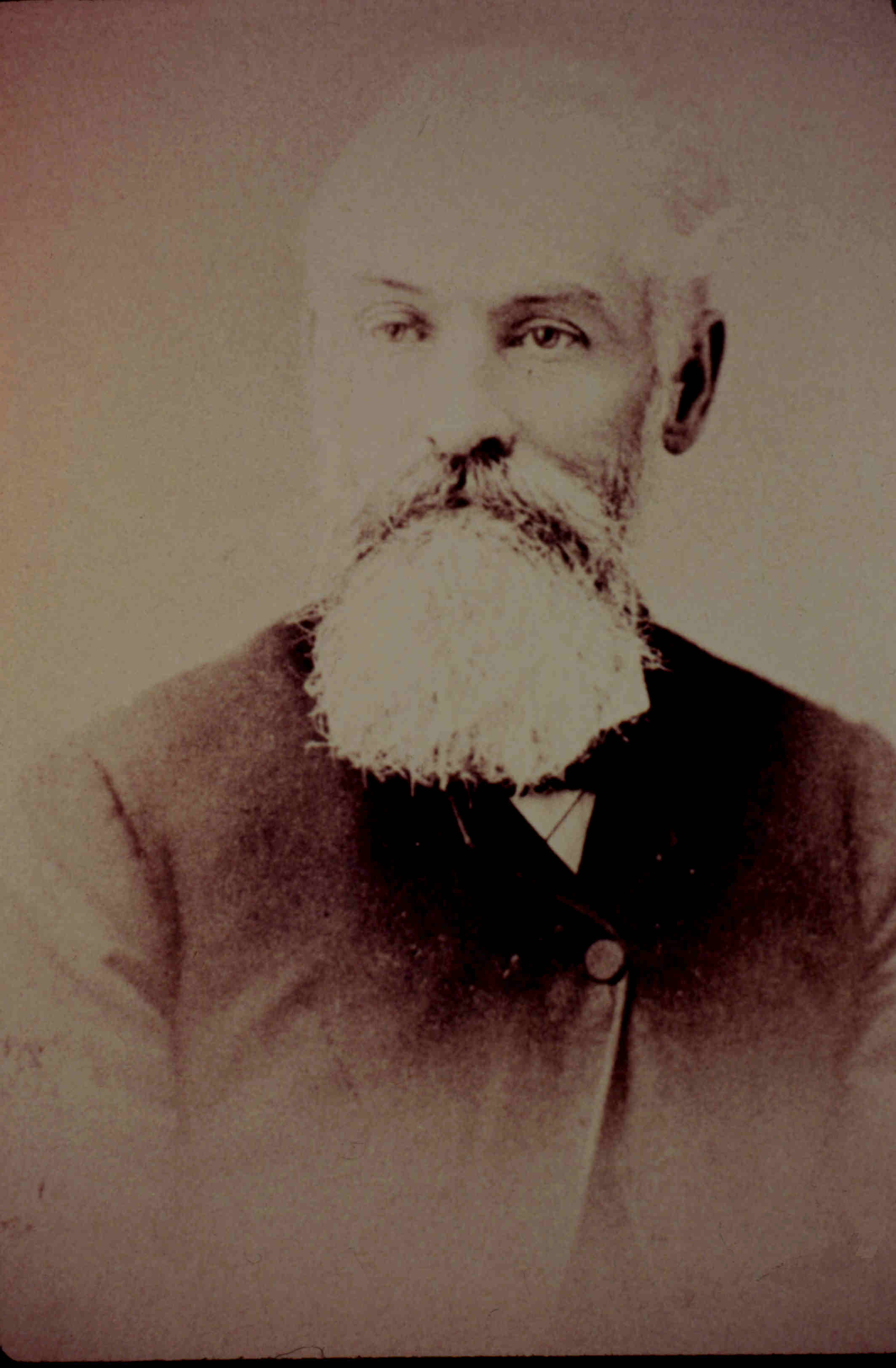
James Crossen Jr. President of Cobourg Car Works circa 1888

The Cobourg Car Works, also known as the Crossen Car Works, was an early railway car and streetcar builder based in Cobourg, Ontario. The company was split off from the Ontario Foundry in 1873 by James Crossen Jr., the foundry's owner. When James died in 1890, control of the company passed to his children, who renamed it as the Crossen Car Manufacturing Company. Supplying almost all of the major Canadian railways, as well as many local regional lines, the Crossen works became the largest car company in Canada. The move to all-steel constructed and CPR's decision to open their own works led to a rapid downturn in business, and the company closed in 1913.

== History ==
=== James Crossen Jr. and the Ontario Foundry ===
The company evolved from the Helm Foundry, a foundry that supplied cast metal fittings and components to grist and flour mills throughout Northumberland County.

James Crossen Jr. (1826-1890) emigrated from Ireland to Batavia, New York in 1842 with his family. At the age of 17, Crossen left his family behind and moved to Cobourg, Ontario where he began work in the Helm Foundry. He moved up the ranks of this company and eventually became a full partner. Eventually the company was renamed Ontario Foundry and, by 1865 James Crossen was listed in a Northumberland/Durham Counties Directory as the sole proprietor of the company.

=== Cobourg Car Works ===
The Ontario Foundry was approached by the Cobourg, Peterborough & Marmora Railway and Mining Company to build twelve wooden railway dump cars for the transportation of ore. Crossen, realizing the capabilities of his foundry to manufacture the metal wheels and under carriage components of the cars, and knowing of a nearby supply of timber, agreed to fill the order. Eventually, one order for cars and rolling stock replaced the previous.

By 1873 various railway companies were coming to the Ontario Foundry to have cars built, and Cossen took the opportunity to form the Cobourg Car Works. The Ontario Foundry faded as his attention turned to the new market. Some of company's earliest customers included the Grand Trunk Railway (GTR), the Canadian Pacific Railway (CPR) and the Intercolonial Railway.

By 1878, the Cobourg Car Works added First Class Passenger Coach Construction to its operations putting it into direct competition with the American firms of the Pullman Company and the Barney and Smith Car Company. In 1879, the Canadian government passed legislation to restrict American Imports of manufactured goods and products. Called the "Tilley Tariff", duties and taxes where put on the importation of products from outside of Canada. This tariff allowed the Cobourg Car Works to flourish, as they could provide an equivalent product at a cheaper cost to railway companies.

=== Crossen Car Manufacturing Company ===
James Crossen died at the age of 64, leaving control of his company to his six children in 1890. The family re-organized and incorporated the company in 1891 under the name Crossen Car Manufacturing Company of Cobourg. James oldest son, William, served as the company's General Manager while his son Frederick served as Secretary Treasurer. His son-in-law, William Renwick Riddell, a prominent Cobourg lawyer, husband of Anna Crossen was elected as the Company President.

In 1896, Frederick Crossen, died at the age of 26 and the continuation of the company was left to William Crossen. At the company's peak, it provided employment to as many as 500 workers, and the company's production output rose to as high as 7 passenger cars and 150 freight cars per month.

=== Closure ===
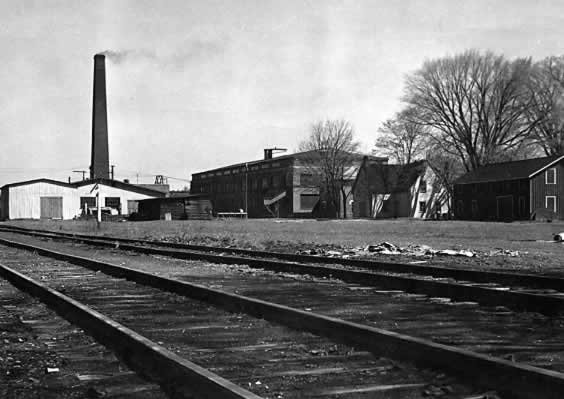
By 1948 all that remained operational was the foundry, seen in the upper left. The tracks of the Cobourg and Peterborough Railway run through the image.

In a display of photographs and materials presented by the Art Gallery of Northumberland, in the 1989 exhibition "Some Prominent Citizens" the exhibit claimed, that Crossen Car Manufacturing Company ceased operations in 1913 and the company's directors liquidated factory's assets soon afterwards. The Gallery referenced, their source of information and materials, as obtained from a great grand daughter of James Crossen, company records and a scrapbook in her possession.

It was also stated that the company's demise came as a result of the introduction of the all-steel cars in 1910. At the time, the company did consider converting their operations to all-steel production, but when one of the company's largest and oldest customers, the Canadian Pacific Railway decided to open their own manufacturing facilities to build cars, it put an abrupt end to the Crossen Company's deliberations. William Crossen died in Toronto in 1927.

The production facilities were later acquired by Dominion Wheel & Foundries Limited and vacated in 1960. The site (northwest of University Avenue West and Division Street) still remains vacant and all buildings relating to Crossen demolished. A small street, Crossen Street, is the only reminder of the company's existence in the area.

The homes of James Crossen at 465 George Street remains near the former manufacturing site.

== Customers ==
The company built cars for the Toronto Railway Company (SE-ST-M) and Birney cars for rival and city owned Toronto Civic Railways. Railcars were bought by:

- Canadian Pacific Railway
- Intercolonial Railway
- Cobourg & Peterborough Railway Company
- Grand Trunk Railway
- Toronto, Grey and Bruce Railway
- Canadian Northern Railway
- Dominion Atlantic Railway

== Products ==
- SE-ST-M streetcar
- Birney cars - Toronto Civic Railways
- four-wheeled ore cars
- passenger cars
- freight cars
- colonist cars
- dining cars
- private cars
- vestibule trains
- parlor cars
- sleeping cars
