= Moira Lake =

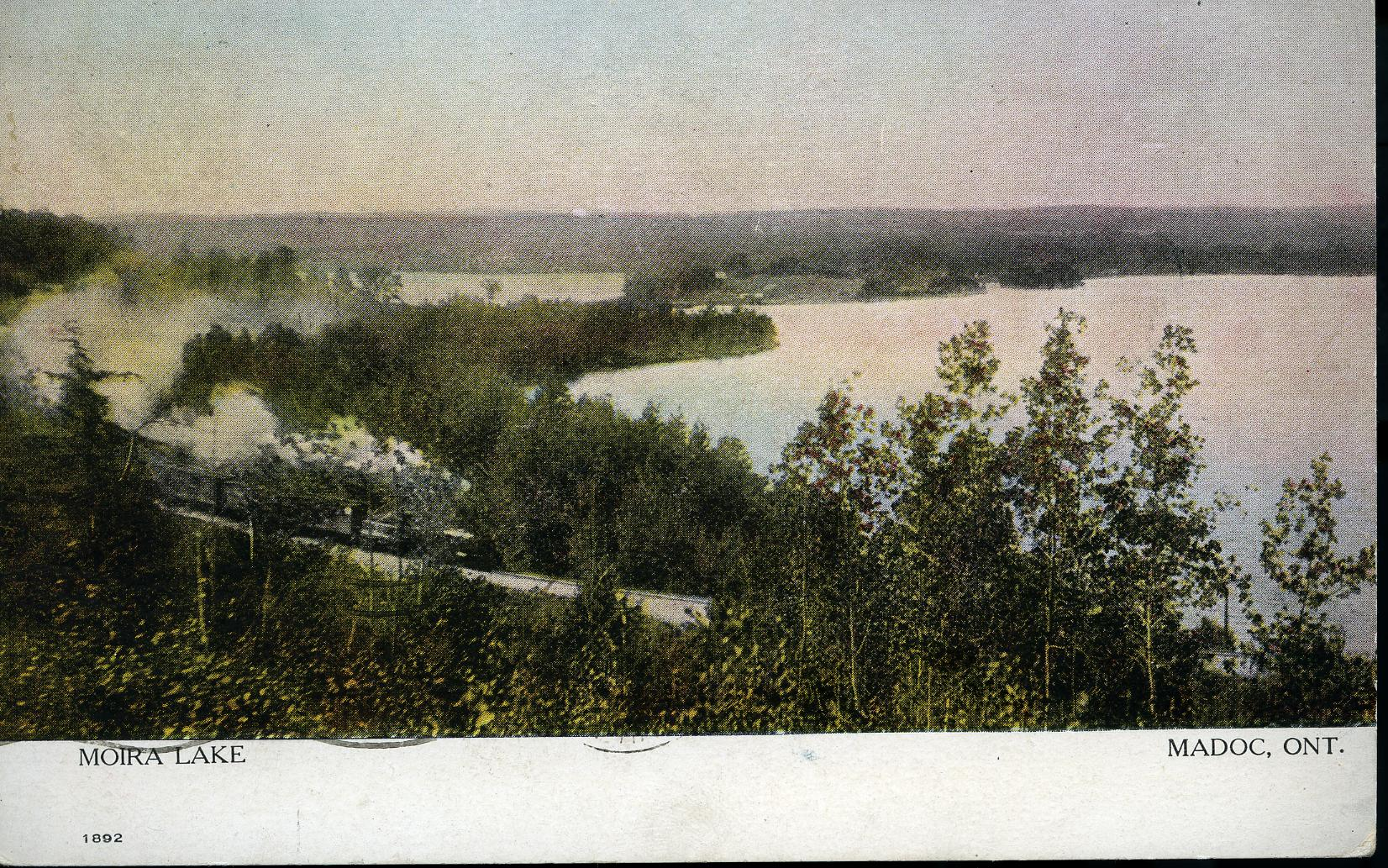
- Postcard of Moira Lake

- Location within Ontario
- Coordinates: 44.48337°N 77.45706°W
- Type: Lake

Moira Lake is a lake in Hastings County in Ontario, Canada. Located on Highway 62 south of Madoc and Highway 7, it is a recreational lake with cottage development along much of the shoreline. The lake is fed by the Moira River. There is a boat launch and a trail that runs past the lake following the abandoned Belleville and North Hastings Railway.

== Etymology ==
The name "Moira Lake" is of Greek origin, meaning "share" or "destiny". Its three islands are named Papoose (a Native American word generally meaning baby or small child), Green Island and Stony island.

== Geography ==
With a total surface area of just over 2000 acres, a maximum depth of 36 feet and an average depth of 14 feet, Moira Lake is an average sized lake that is in two parts: Lower lake, the larger of the two, and Upper Lake. The Moira River feeds the lake from the top of Upper Lake, and drains at the far eastern end of Lower Lake. It is not a part of the Trent Waterway system, but is a closed lake. The river on either end is accessible for about 1 km before rocks and the dams prevent further boat travel.

== Hydrology ==
Moira Lake is borderline eutrophic, meaning that the lake experiences high algae and weed growth particularly during late summer. Cottagers often hire a weed harvester to clear heavy weeds from dock areas in order to allow access to boats. The lake has a limestone bottom that has prevented acidification due to acid rain.

In dry summer weather, the Moira river may cease to flow in or out of the lake in order to maintain a more consistent level.

The wastewater treatment center of the town of Madoc releases effluent into the lake twice per year, usually over two 28-45 day periods. The effluent contains fecal coliform and phosphorus, but did not exceed limits set by provincial regulations. The total amount of effluent released in 2018 was 347,103 cubic meters.

== History of Madoc ==
Moira Lake has one town nearby, the town of Madoc. Donald MacKenzie, the founder of Madoc, arrived in the early 1830s and set about to build a saw mill and a grist mill. For the next 20 years the community was called Mackenzies Mills, then Hastings and finally Madoc.

The following edited excerpt from "Hidden Ontario" explains a temporary growth in Madoc's population: The discovery of gold near Madoc in 1866 touched off a gold rush equalled only by that of the one in California. On August 15, 1866 Marcus Powell and an old miner named Snider, searching high and low on John Richardson's farm, the men made a discovery: they found a vein of gold! Word of the discovery remained a secret for a short time but with the available gold running at 22 carats pure, the story was bound to get out. New hotels could not be built fast enough, with 2000 people being expected from Prince Edward County alone. Madoc was in the newspapers and magazines across Europe. The village population expanded rapidly from 900 to 5000. As most of the gold mines in the area failed due to the difficulty and expense of extracting gold, other mineral deposits were discovered including copper, lead, marble, talc, and lithographic stone. (Courtesy of Hidden Ontario by Terry Boyle, 1999)

== Natural habitat ==
Moira Lake is surrounded by typical eastern Ontario foliage and marsh/swamps. The shoreline has been built up with cottages to the point that most of the lakeshore has been adapted for human use. As such, fishing pressures have increased. In particular, excessive ice fishing in Ontario lakes during winter has put pressure on overall perch and walleye populations, including those in Moira Lake.

Nevertheless, Moire Lake has a variety of fish, including largemouth bass, walleye, northern pike, musky, perch, catfish, rock bass, longnose gar, bluegill, and smallmouth bass. Overall, there is a great variety of species, but "overfishing of various species", along with other possible causes such as phytoplankton disruption due to mining and agricultural practices, has caused a drop in general fish populations.

== Environmental concerns ==
During the 20th century, Moira Lake suffered from the release of arsenic and other metals from the nearby Deloro Mine and Deloro River. For example, a paper from 1993 revealed that "The sediments of Moira Lake, Ontario, have accumulated large quantities of arsenic and toxic metals since the 1830s when mining began in its drainage basin. Despite the fact that the mine activities ceased in 1961, leachates from the abandoned mine wastes still deliver large quantities (about 3.5 Mg.y−1) of arsenic to the lake." However, a multi-million dollar effort by the government of Ontario, known as "The Deloro site cleanup project", has reduced "the amount of arsenic going into the Moira River from the Deloro site ... by over 90 per cent."

Zebra mussels have invaded the lake, brought in by boaters visiting the lake from other mussel-infested waters or by zebra mussels transiting via the Moira River that feeds into Lake Ontario. Efforts to control the zebra mussel population have had some positive impact on the population.

Phosphorus counts performed on the lake demonstrate that Moira Lake has high total phosphorus concentrations associated with algae growth, caused by a number of factors including its shallow average depth, agricultural practices and industrial impacts.

== See also ==
- List of lakes in Ontario
