= Port Whitby and Port Perry Railway =

Former railway in Ontario, Canada

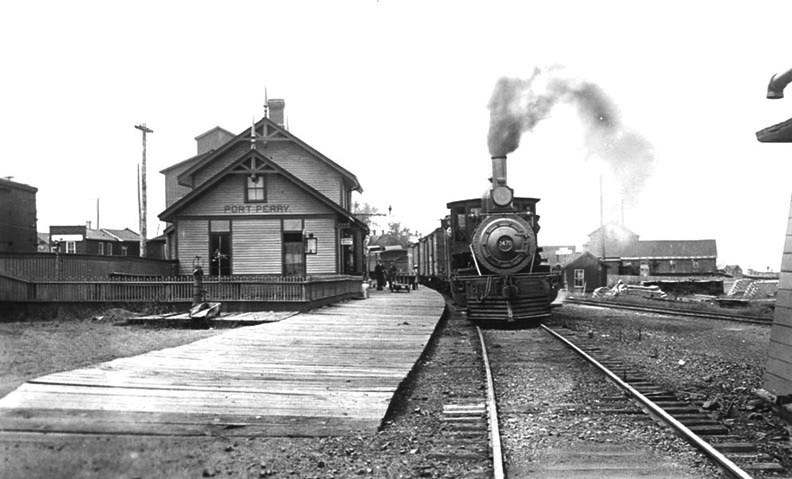
- The Port Perry railway station on the PW&PP, seen looking north some time in 1912. The line leading to Lindsay can be seen running just to the right. The Ross Elevator can be seen in the background, rising over the roof of the station. The station area is now Palmer Park.

Overview
- Headquarters: Whitby, Ontario
- Reporting mark: PW&PP
- Locale: Greater Toronto Area, Ontario, Canada
- Dates of operation: 1871–1941

Technical
- Track gauge: 4 ft 8 1/2 in (1,435 mm) standard gauge

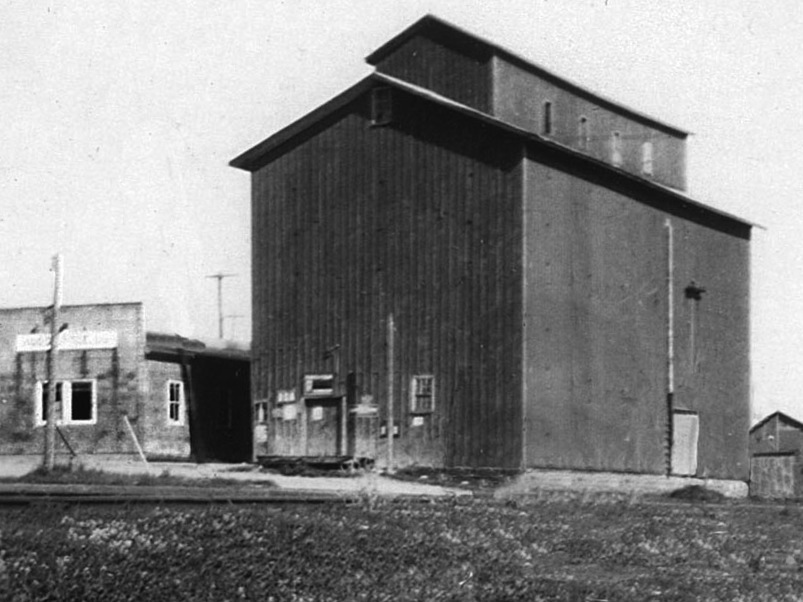
The Port Perry mill and grain elevator, circa 1930. Originally built in 1873, the building remains a major landmark to this day. The original line of the PW&PP Railway can be seen in the foreground.

The Port Whitby and Port Perry Railway (PW&PP) was a railway running from Whitby to Port Perry, running north–south about 50 km east of Toronto. It was built to connect local grain and logging interests with the railway mainlines on the shores of Lake Ontario. It was later extended northeast to Lindsay, becoming the Whitby, Port Perry and Lindsay Railway (WPP&L).

The railway was never very successful, as the original engineering was considered sub-par and reliability was poor from the start. It earned the nickname "The Nip 'n Tuck", a euphemism for something considered unreliable. The last train ran in 1939, a specially commissioned passenger train, and the rails were pulled up in 1941 to feed wartime steel production.

== History ==
=== Background ===
Reach Township started filling out in the 1840s and developed a rivalry between three incorporated towns, Prince Albert, Port Perry and Manchester. The three towns were only a kilometer from each other, lying along a roughly east–west line at the southern tip of Lake Scugog. Rivalries between the towns were intense, and Peter Perry predicted that one day goats would eat grass off of Prince Albert's main street.

Simcoe Street, a graveled toll road, had recently been constructed through Prince Albert. By 1850, Prince Albert was the second largest grain-buying market in what was then known as "Canada West" (today's Ontario). Grain and timber, the major exports from the area to the north, were hauled to Prince Albert, ganged into larger loads, and then sent southward by horse team on Simcoe Street for shipment abroad.

In the 1850s Abraham Farewell, an early advocate of the development of Ontario County through the construction of gravel roads, predicted that unless a railway was built from Georgian Bay to Whitby, control of the inland grain and timber trade would be taken over by Toronto and Port Hope interests. There had been some talk of introducing the "Port Whitby & Port Huron Railway" to pre-empt this possibility, and although a charter was granted in April 1853, no money was forthcoming and nothing came of these early plans.

By the 1860s the need to connect to the newly forming mainlines along Lake Ontario had become more pressing. Plans for the Toronto and Nipissing Railway (T&N) that would connect Beaverton to the dockyards at the Gooderham & Worts distilleries in Toronto would cut off the customers to the west, while the Midland Railway to Port Hope would do the same to the east. These developments had the potential to make the entire Reach area a has-been economically.

=== Raising funds ===
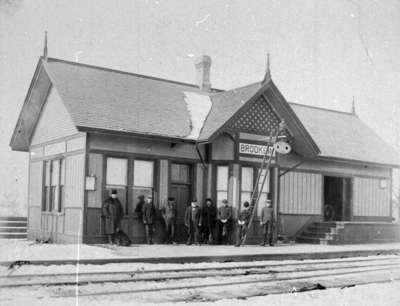
Men stand outside the Brooklin station on the PW&PP, c. 1905

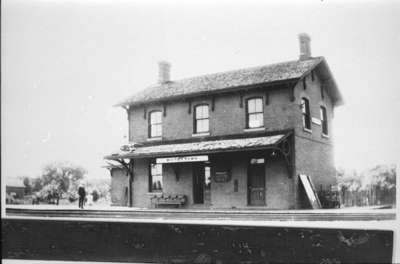
The Uptown Station (placarded "Whitby Town") as seen looking south-west. The station was located in downtown Whitby just south of Dundas Street on the east side of Hickory. The station remained in use until 1963 as a post office shipping depot and was demolished in 1970. It retained its connection to the Canadian Pacific lines just to the north until they were pulled up in 1978.

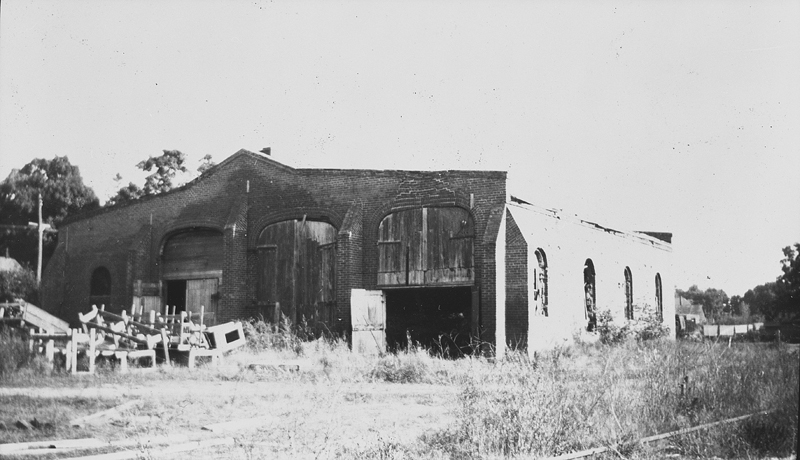
The PW&PP engine house in Whitby as seen in 1946, after the line closed. The house is located just to the north-east of the Uptown Station. The tracks running between the Canadian Pacific and Grand Trunk lines can be seen on the far right, overgrown with weeds. The building was used as a garage for some time during the 1960s.

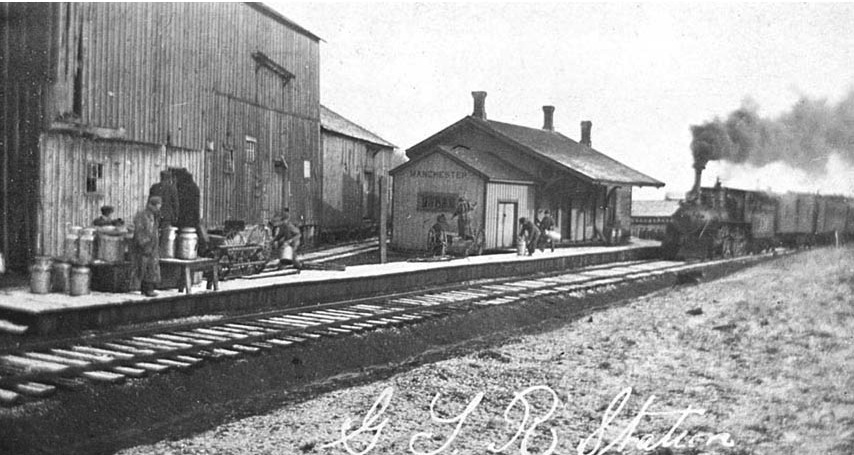
A train from Whitby pulls into Manchester Station, about one mile south of the town of Manchester.

Port Perry was ideally located to gather materials from a considerable area due to its lakeside location on Lake Scugog, which had connections to the Trent-Severn Waterway that offered easy access to large areas of northern Ontario. If a railway was built to the lakeshore, barges could carry produce to Port Perry and then be quickly trans-shipped southward. This would save considerable time compared to shipping by barge to the other access points in towns further northeast like Bobcaygeon or the terminus (at the time) in Peterborough. Lake Scugog was the southernmost point easily reachable from the Trent-Severn, cutting almost 100 kilometres (62 mi) off the route. (Note: The town of Newmarket, Ontario would attempt to replace Port Perry as the southernmost point on the Trent-Severn with the Newmarket Canal, but this was never completed.) Serious efforts to build a line to Port Perry started in 1867, led by the efforts of Joseph Bigelow and Thomas Paxton, men of some import in Port Perry.

Each of the towns took part in the decision on the exact route, which was uncontentious to the south but a matter of some concern within Reach. Adam Gordon, at one time a Canadian Member of Parliament, wanted the line to pass through Manchester, where he lived and was very active in local politics. Joshua Wright, a famed orator, wanted the line to pass near a tannery outside of Prince Albert. Bigelow and Paxton argued the case for Port Perry. A route was finally decided on, making all of the towns happy, running just south of Manchester and east of Prince Albert with the terminus on the shore of Lake Scugog in Port Perry.

Bigelow and Paxton gathered a Provisional Board of Directors which included W.S. Sexton, Chester Draper, John Ham Perry, James Holden and Sheriff Reynolds. Bigelow was named president of the company. A charter was secured 4 March 1868 and fundraising activities began. Each of the towns on the route put up money for the construction; $50,000 from Whitby Town (today's Whitby), $20,000 from Whitby Township, $30,000 from Reach Township. Part of the deal with Whitby was that the existing toll structure on the gravel road from Whitby to Prince Albert would be dropped.

Additionally, the railway argued that the Lindsay Lock on the Trent-Severn should be rebuilt; it had been converted into a log slide in 1859. Access from Lindsay to the south was an important part of the Midland Railway's plan of business, connecting to the mainlines in Port Hope. They did not want to see access to Scugog restored to benefit a competing railway. The newly formed Government of Canada refused to fund the effort, stating that they did not want to get involved in what appeared to be a turf-war between the PW&PP and the Midland Railway. They turned the question over to the Ontario legislature, where Port Perry found strong support from Toronto as it would cut the shipping distance from Lindsay to Toronto by 90 miles. The Midland Railway then proposed a plan to build a bridge "to interfere with the Navigation of the River to prevent the passage of Lumber and other freight through to the proposed Port Whitby and Port Perry Railway.". The PW&PP eventually took over the work on the lock, Midland's bridge never having been built.

=== Construction ===
An official sod-turning ceremony was eventually made on 6 October 1869 by Prince Arthur. The contract for building the railroad itself was originally given to J. H. Drumble of Cobourg with a roadbed using 5 ft 6 in (1,676 mm) Broad gauge, which was then known as Provincial gauge. They were forced into bankruptcy and sold the contract to C. E. English of Toronto. They restarted the line at 4 ft 8 1/2 in (1,435 mm) standard gauge, but got in a dispute with the railway and abandoned further work when the company could not pay for the work rendered. (Note: It is unclear if construction started at 5 ft 6 in (1,676 mm) and was abandoned, or if the line was always 4 ft 8 1/2 in (1,435 mm) gauge. The latter seems more likely, given the changeover that was taking place on the GNR at the same time.) The company was now short of funds, and Bigelow decided to add an additional $40,000, although that required him to give up the presidency of the company.

Southern portions were completed on 31 August 1870 and opened for traffic in July 1871. The first trains were able to reach the southern end of Reach in November 1871, and the first train arrived in Port Perry in the spring of 1872. The railway was poorly built and constantly needed repair. The poor foundation of the roadbed often led to the engine sinking in the marshy area between High Point and Manchester. The hills of the Oak Ridges Moraine south of Reach gave the railway its nickname because it was "nip n' tuck" whether or not it could make its way up the grade when loaded. (Note: The precise origin of the nickname varies from source to source, suggesting it was due to questionable finances, questionable roadbed, or questionable ability to climb the grade.) A ride from Port Perry to the mainlines at Whitby was 70 cents and took about one hour.

In spite of any problems, as Peter Perry had earlier predicted, the railway turned Port Perry into the center of Reach Township. Business quickly moved out of Manchester and Prince Albert, and in a few years Prince Albert nearly turned into a ghost town, leaving only a general store, a post office and a blacksmith. As Port Perry grew the original alignment of Simcoe Street was changed to run through Port Perry instead of Prince Albert, and today Prince Albert is effectively the southern portion of Port Perry.

=== Extension ===
In 1873 the company sold out to James Austin (president of The Dominion Bank), James Michie and James Holden. The three had big plans for the railway, and renamed the company the "Whitby & Port Perry Extension Railway" (W&PPE), with rights to build to Gravenhurst, the Muskoka River and beyond. The company already owned two steamships on Lake Scugog, the Ogemah and Victoria, which had benefitted greatly from the PW&PP and the traffic it drove on the Lake.

In 1874 the company scaled back their plans, with a new termination in Lindsay, becoming the "Whitby, Port Perry & Lindsay Railway". Port Perry put up $20,000 for the extension, only to find that much business left the town as a result. The eventual cost of the railway was over one million dollars, and despite all the bonuses, federal and provincial subsidies, with $600,000 in bonds the company was too heavily indebted to ever become really profitable.

After the railway was extended, other operating companies started watching the books until the company was able to show a margin of profit. As soon as this happened, the Midland Railway bought the company in 1881, joining it to their line from Port Hope to Lindsay. They leased the competing T&N the same year, before leasing their entire road system to the Grand Trunk Railway (GTR) in 1884.

=== Demise ===
In spite of early hopes, and some success, the line was never very profitable. Low quality of the roadbed made for poor reliability and continual maintenance. As Ontario railways began to consolidate, many routes through the area became superfluous. The GTR, later part of Canadian National Railways, used the line less and less, and eventually ended scheduled service.

The last service to run on the line was a special passenger-only service to Toronto to bring well-wishers to the Royal Tour of 1939 by King George VI and Queen Elizabeth. The war was only months away at this point, and as Canada entered the war effort the railway was eventually sold as scrap, its rails fed into steel mills for the war effort. Portions of the route in Whitby were used as industrial spurs for some time and not pulled up until 1978, and the connection from the T&N to Lindsay was used until 1991.

== Route ==
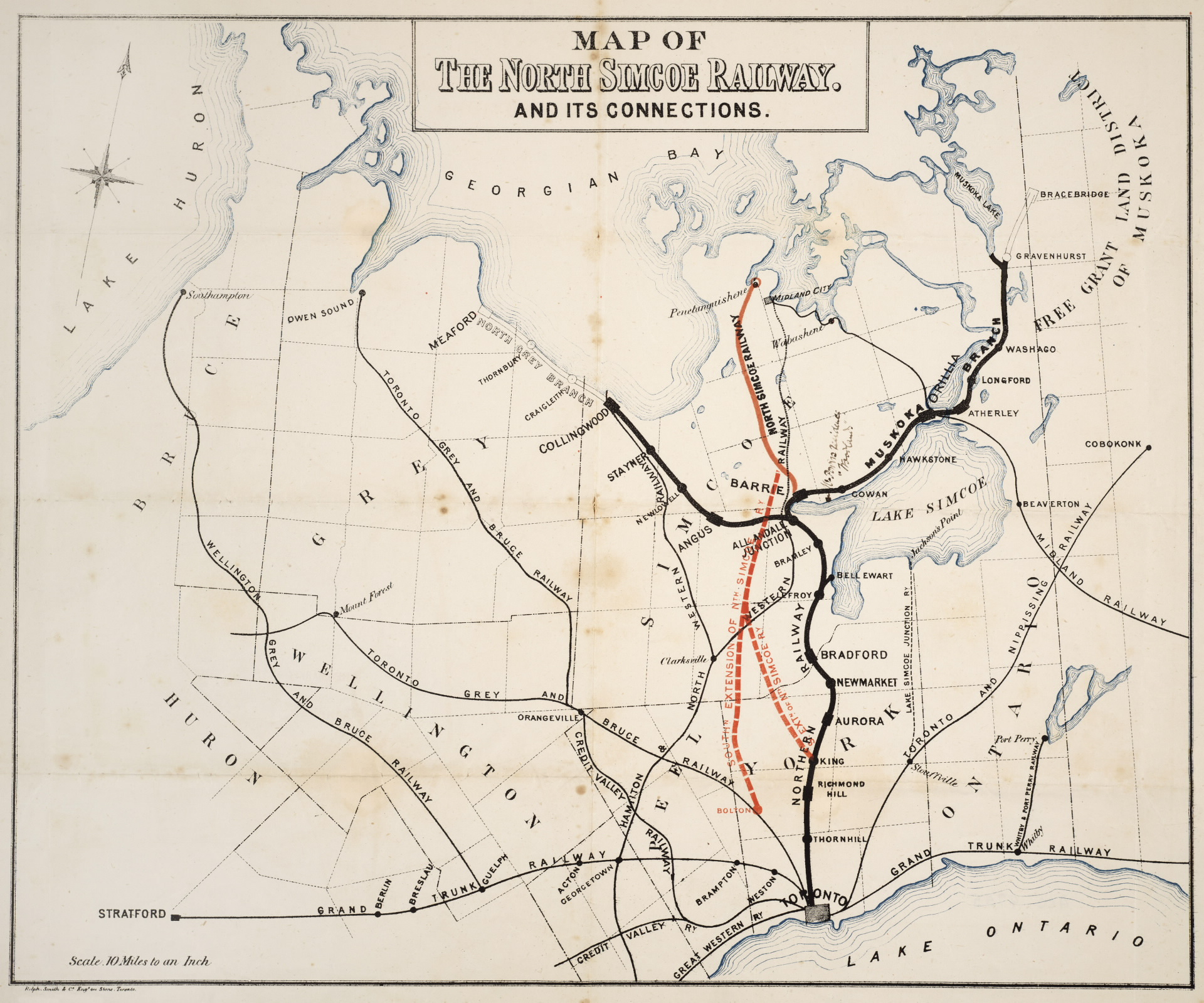
A rather simplified version of the PW&PP route appears near the lower right of this map. This was drawn prior to its extension to Lindsay.

Unless otherwise noted, the following is taken from the Southern Ontario Railway Map.

The PW&PP ran almost due north from a dock at Port Whitby to its own two-story station in Whitby, then a meandering northward path through the Oak Ridges Moraine with stations at Brooklin, Myrtle, south of Manchester, east of Prince Albert and finally running northeast into Port Perry. The WPP&L extension to Lindsay ran northward adding stations at Seagrave, Sonya, and Manilla Junction (between Manilla and Cresswell), and then turned sharply east through Mariposa and Ops, before joining the Midland Railway southwest of Lindsay. In Lindsay, the WPP&L joined with the Victoria Railway at Union Station. When the competing T&N stated north out of Uxbridge in 1883, a connecting spur was added to the WPP&L, running southeast from Manilla to meet the T&N just outside Blackwater at a location known as Blackwater Junction.

The section from Port Perry to Manilla Junction was abandoned in 1937, directing traffic from Lindsay along the spur to the T&N at Blackwater Junction, which led more directly to Toronto. The rest of the line south from Port Perry was pulled up shortly thereafter in 1941, leaving only the sections south of the CNR in use as industrial spurs on the Whitby lakeshore until 1978. The section from Lindsay to Blackwater remained in operation until 1991.

The main station in Port Perry was later moved from its original position on the lakeshore at Palmer Park across Water Street to form a portion of the collection of buildings at Water and Mary. The last remaining portion of the line itself was under the Roadhouse Motor Hotel where it crossed Scugog Street, but disappeared when the site was redeveloped by Shopper's Drug Mart.

Although the last portions of the main railbed were removed in 1941, most of the route can be seen in aerial and satellite photography to this day. It is particularly prominent as it runs northwest out of Port Perry before turning northeast towards Lindsay. A small portion of the former railbed forms Old Rail Line street in Port Perry, just north of the final location of the station. The section from Blackwater to Lindsay, remaining in active use until the 1990s, now forms a major part of the Beaver River Wetland Trail, and forms a portion of the Trans Canada Trail.

== See also ==
- CN Kingston Subdivision
- Grand Trunk Railway
- List of Ontario railways
- List of defunct Canadian railways
