= Midland Railway of Canada =

Railway line in Ontario (1851; 1869–1893)

Overview
- Locale: Ontario, Canada
- Dates of operation: 1869 (as Midland Railway)–1893
- Predecessor: Port Hope, Lindsay & Beaverton Railway (1854-1869)
- Successor: Grand Trunk Railway

Technical
- Track gauge: 4 ft 8 1/2 in (1,435 mm) standard gauge

The Midland Railway of Canada was a historical Canadian railway which ran from Port Hope, Ontario to Midland on Georgian Bay. The line was originally intended to run to Peterborough, but the competing Cobourg and Peterborough Railway was completed in 1854 and the owner's plans changed. Redirecting the line northward, it opened as the Port Hope, Lindsay & Beaverton Railway, a much longer line than originally planned. A further expansion launched in 1869 pushed the line westward towards Georgian Bay, and prompted renaming as the Midland Railway.

By the 1880s the area east of Toronto was over-served by a number of short and generally unprofitable lines. Merger plans between the various lines began in 1881, which resulted in the Midland adding a third rail to the Toronto and Nipissing Railway's (T&N) narrow-gauge line to allow Midland trains to follow the T&N lines into Scarborough. The merger was officially completed in 1881. On 10 March 1882 the company arranged an enormous merger of many of the smaller railways in the area, including the Whitby, Port Perry and Lindsay Railway, Victoria Railway, Toronto and Ottawa Railway and Grand Junction Railway to become a greatly expanded Midland Railway with 474 miles (763 km) of track. Only two years later the Grand Trunk Railway leased most of the lines in the area as part of a major expansion plan, and purchased them outright in 1893.

The Midland was one of the earliest examples of a rail trail conversion in Ontario, started as a Canadian Centennial project. Today, the Midland Railway mainline forms a major portion of the Ganaraska Hiking Trail, the first section of which (between Port Hope and Lindsay) opened in 1968.

== History ==
=== Designs on Peterborough ===
Fierce competition between the Lake Ontario port towns of Port Hope and neighbouring Cobourg drove development of transport through the area during the middle of the 19th century. The competition had started with the 1834 announcements of plans to run a railway from Cobourg to Peterborough, at that time a rapidly developing industrial town. The initial plans for the Cobourg and Peterborough Railway went nowhere due to a lack of funds, especially after the Panic of 1837.

The formation of the federal government and its ministry for development led to both Port Hope and Cobourg competing for funds to develop a line to Peterborough. The Cobourg line was designed to run across Rice Lake, and was therefore more risky than the Port Hope line that ran around the western end of the Lake. The Port Hope proposal was accepted, and The Peterborough and Port Hope Railway Company (P&PH) was officially chartered on 16 December 1846.

Cobourg responded by rapidly building a plank road near their original railway route, which was completed by the end of the year. Meanwhile, the Port Hope plans received no further funding, and eventually went moribund. Cobourg's plank road proved impassible in spring and fall, and by 1850 had fallen into disrepair. Plans for a railway from Cobourg once again surfaced, this time more successfully. Construction on the line started in 1853, and the new Cobourg and Peterborough Railway (C&P) reached Peterborough at the end of 1854.

=== Lindsay and Beaverton ===
With the route to Peterborough now being served by Cobourg, and their original plans having seen no development for six years, business interests in Port Hope looked further north for potential markets. They eventually selected the town of Lindsay due to its connection to the recently announced Trent-Severn Waterway, with a further expansion to the shores of Lake Simcoe.

The new railway received its charter on 18 December 1854 as The Port Hope, Lindsay and Beaverton Railway Company (PHL&B). Construction reached Lindsay in late 1857. By that time the Cobourg and Peterborough had proven to be unreliable due to its constantly failing bridge, and the Lindsay and Beaverton opened their Millbrook Branch to Peterborough in 1858. This was a serious threat to the C&P, who ousted their operator, D'Arcy Boulton Jr.

Boulton soon took out the operations lease on the Millbrook Branch along with two partners, Henry Covert and John Fowler. The next year the three presented a plan to lease operations of the C&P as well. As soon as this was completed, the new operators laid off the men working to finally fix the C&P bridge over Rice Lake, and later sabotaged it so that it eventually fell into the lake around 1861. The PHL&B now had exclusive access to Peterborough, which they retained for some time.

Further expansions were slow in coming. The line did not reach its planned terminus in Beaverton until 1 January 1871, and that same year the Millbrook Branch pushed north out of Peterborough to Lakefield, giving it access to the middle-area of the Trent waterway on Katchewanooka Lake. The competing Cobourg line started the similar Peterborough and Chemong Lake Railway in 1857, but this was not completed until 1891.

The Railway started the 1870s in good financial condition. In 1870 its receipts were $242,157 against expenses of $113,227, an Operating Ratio of 47%. By this time the company had plans for a much more ambitious expansion.

=== Midland Railway ===
On 24 December 1869 the company was re-chartered as The Midland Railway of Canada (MR) with plans to drive around Lake Simcoe and the head towards Midland to provide access to Georgian Bay. In 1872 Frank Shanly was awarded the contract for the new fifty-three mile section. There were unforeseen difficulties with the ground and a rapid increase in labour costs, which ruined Shanly. The Midland was financially strapped, could not afford to pay Shanly for the extras, and seized the contract back in February 1873.

At the same time the recession hit freight receipts which fell by 30% between 1872 and 1874. The first Midland Railway manager D’Arcy E. Boulton of Cobourg, Ontario was replaced by Adolf Hugel of Pittsburgh. Hugel invested money in steel rails and struggled to cut costs. In recognition of his efforts to improve the line, the British bondholders agreed in 1874 to lower the rate on their investments, and not to cash the interest coupons. The line eventually reached Orillia in 1873, Waubaushene in 1875 and Midland in 1879.

Net earnings and the ability to pay interest on the fixed debt declined sharply after 1875, the Midland was insolvent and the ownership of the line essentially passed to the bondholders. The Chairman of their Committee was Sir Henry Tyler of the Grand Trunk Railway and most of the other members were GTR nominees. George Albertus Cox, a prosperous insurance agent for Canada Life and several times Mayor of Peterborough, took over as President of the MR in August 1878.

== Merger ==
The Midland (144 route miles) was surrounded by railways which also were not making money:

- The Grand Junction Railway of Canada (90 route miles)
- The Belleville and North Hastings Railway (15 route miles)
- The Victoria Railway (56 route miles)
- The Whitby, Port Perry and Lindsay Railway (46½ route miles)
- The Toronto and Nipissing Railway (114 route miles of 3' 6" gauge)

Cox first floated a proposal to purchase the Toronto and Nipissing Railway in July 1881 in order to gain the supreme prize of direct Midland Railway access to Toronto. Negotiations continued throughout the Fall and Winter when the shareholders and bondholders were presented with a proposal for ‘Approving an agreement between the Toronto and Nipissing Railway Company; the Whitby, Port Perry and Lindsay Company, the Victoria Railway Company, the Toronto and Ottawa Railway Company; the Grand Junction Railway Company and the Midland Railway Company for the purpose of consolidating said companies into one company, under the name of the Midland Railway of Canada.’

The T&NR and the Midland Railway had always maintained good relations and since it was certain that the T&NR could not long survive in its present form, work commenced during the negotiations to lay a third rail from The Town of Midland to Scarborough Junction. The first through passenger train from Peterborough to Toronto ran on December 15, 1881. An Act enabling the merger came into force on Saturday April 1, 1882 and on that day the first official trains of the new Midland Railway of Canada travelled the system. On January 1, 1884 the GTR finally consolidated its hold on the Midland group of companies by leasing them. Amalgamation of the companies was authorized in 1893. It was eventually absorbed into the Canadian National Railway system.

== Surviving Facilities ==
- 3 in Port Hope, 1 in Orillia, 3 of them being stations.

Stations: Downtown Port Hope: Now known as Lent travel, (67 Walton Street, with an outbuilding present further down the trail marking the extent of the station)

Northern Port Hope: Now the ministry of transport regional office (This station was the second built in Port Hope, much larger than the first station, at 138 Hope Street N, Port Hope)

Orillia: Now an online shopping centre, 158 Front St. S, Orillia, ON

Crew Lodgings:

Downtown Port Hope: Now known as the Ganaraska Hotel (30 Ontario St. Port Hope) the building housed railway personnel overnight as their trains were loaded up to be sent up north the next day. Located a short distance away from the downtown station and the port facilities.

There are also several locations going up towards Midland where evidence of the trackage is still visible, for example crossing the narrows between Lake Simcoe and Lake Couchiching you can see the remains of a swing bridge, along with several kilometres of rail bed, as well as a bridge over highway 12 in Midland

== See also ==
- Whitby, Port Perry and Lindsay Railway
- Victoria Railway
- Grand Junction Railway (Ontario)
- List of Ontario railways
- History of rail transport in Canada
- List of defunct Canadian railways
