= Victoria Railway =

Canadian railway

Overview
- Locale: Ontario, Canada
- Dates of operation: 1878–1990s (line abandoned)

Technical
- Track gauge: 4 ft 8 1/2 in (1,435 mm) standard gauge

The Victoria Railway was a 55.52-mile (89.35 km) long Canadian railway that operated in Central Ontario. Construction under Chief Engineer James Ross began in 1874 from Lindsay, Ontario, with authority to build through Victoria County to Haliburton, Ontario, to which it opened on November 24, 1878. The line is best known as having been built by a large group of Icelandic immigrants, who found the Kinmount winters too rough, and so they all moved to Gimli, Manitoba. The line became part of the Midland Railway of Canada and then later part of the Canadian National Railways. The line was abandoned completely by the early 1990s.

== History ==
The Fenelon Falls Railway Company was formed in 1871. In 1872, it was renamed the Lindsay, Fenelon Falls and Ottawa River Railway Company. The railway was intended to run north from Lindsay in southern Ontario through Victoria County and connect with a proposed line of the Canadian Pacific Railway near Mattawa in northeastern Ontario. In 1873, the company adopted the name "Victoria Railway".

The railway was originally planned as a narrow-gauge line, but it was later converted to standard gauge. The project faced opposition from the town of Peterborough, while Lindsay and the unincorporated village of Fenelon Falls supported the railway. In 1874, Fenelon Falls was incorporated as a village and the Provisional County of Haliburton was created from the northern townships of Peterborough and Victoria counties. On August 5, 1874, Christopher Finlay Fraser, the Ontario Commissioner of Public Works, approved funding for construction in Lindsay.

Construction began on the section between Lindsay and Kinmount, a community north of Fenelon Falls. Workers faced difficult conditions from the beginning. Large pine stumps left behind by earlier logging operations had to be removed before track could be laid, and several major bridges were required along the route, including crossings over Distillery Creek, McLaren's Creek, the Fenelon River, and the Burnt River. The bridge over the Fenelon River alone cost $20,000.

Work on the railway was interrupted twice during the financial depression of 1875. Much of the construction work was carried out by about 300 Icelandic men, women, and children who settled in Kinmount in 1874. Construction was also affected by an outbreak of dysentery, and the Icelandic community relocated to Manitoba in September 1875.

Construction later resumed after steel supplies arrived, despite continuing financial difficulties. Victoria Railway president George Laidlaw secured additional funding through an Ontario government grant of $8,000 per mile and another $3,000 per mile from the Canada Land and Emigration Company, which owned much of Haliburton County. Further north, construction crews encountered additional problems 6.4 km (4.0 mi) beyond Kinmount, where a large rock cutting and a sinkhole affected the final 35 km (22 mi) of track.

After more than four years of construction, interruptions, and engineering difficulties, the 90 km (56 mi) railway between Lindsay and Haliburton village opened to traffic on November 26, 1878.

In 1880, the Victoria Railway was acquired by the Midland Railway of Canada. In 1882, the Victoria Railway Company was consolidated with the Midland Railway of Canada, the Toronto and Nipissing Railway, the Whitby, Port Perry and Lindsay Railway, the Toronto and Ottawa Railway, and the Grand Junction Railway.

== Principal stations ==
- Lindsay, Ontario
- Cameron, Ontario
- Fenelon Falls, Ontario
- Fell(s), Ontario
- Burnt River, Ontario
- Watsons, Ontario
- Kinmount, Ontario
- Gelert, Ontario
- Lochlin, Ontario
- Donald, Ontario
- Haliburton, Ontario

=== Howland Junction ===
Howland Junction was the junction of the Victoria Railway with the Irondale, Bancroft and Ottawa Railway (IB&O). It was the southern terminus of the IB&O. The site was originally a flag stop on the Victoria Railway known as Kendrick's, and took its name from nearby Kendrick's Creek. When William Myles built his horse-drawn wagonway, the Myles Branch Tramway, this interchange point with the Victoria Railway became known as Myles Junction.

The place was renamed to Kinmount Junction following the collapse of Myles' business operations in the area, then once again renamed Howland Junction.

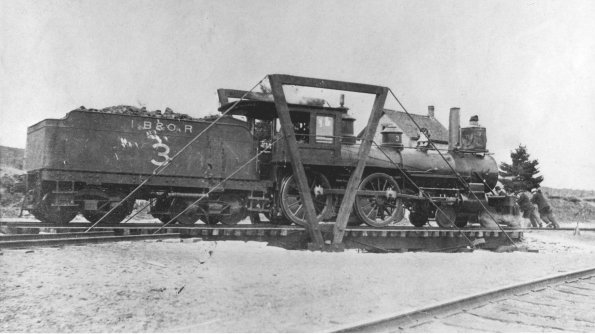
IB&O locomotive #3 on the turntable at Howland Junction, c. 1902.

== Closure ==
The line became part of Canadian National Railways in 1923 with its acquisition of the former Grand Trunk Railway of Canada. Mixed freight/passenger train service ran until September, 1960. CN applied for abandonment in 1978. The Canadian Transport Commission approved the line's abandonment in 1981, and most of the line being taken up in 1983; a final short section south of Kent St Lindsay was taken up in October 1992. The entire length of the line is now the Haliburton County Rail Trail and the Victoria Rail Trail public recreational trails.
