= Cobourg and Peterborough Railway =

Railway line in Ontario, Canada

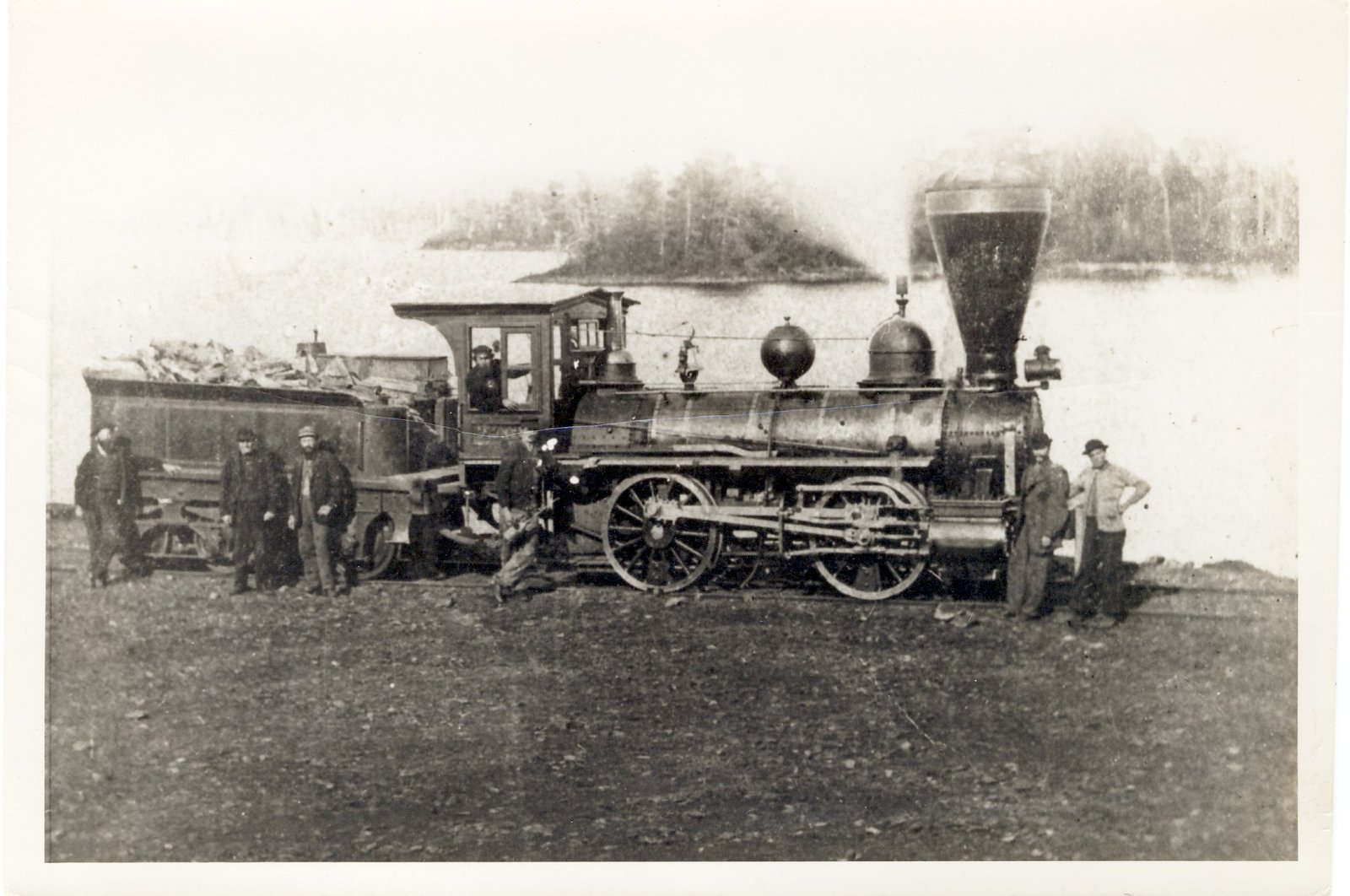
- A locomotive on the Blairton Extension of the Cobourg and Peterborough Railway circa 1870.

Overview
- Headquarters: Cobourg, Ontario
- Locale: Ontario, Canada
- Dates of operation: 1854–1898

Technical
- Track gauge: 4 ft 8 1/2 in (1,435 mm) standard gauge

The Cobourg and Peterborough Railway (C&PRy) was one of the first railway lines to be built in Central Ontario, Canada. The line was initially considered in 1831 as a way to bring the products from the burgeoning area around Peterborough to markets on Lake Ontario through the port in the town of Cobourg. Before the railway the only means of travel was by stage coach lines between larger populated areas overland or by boat. A series of problems, including the Upper Canada Rebellion and the Panic of 1837, meant that construction did not begin until 1853, reaching Peterborough in 1854.

The line ran directly over Rice Lake on what was then the largest trestle bridge in the world. However, it was not the strongest, and the bridge was shifted due to ice only a few days after opening. Problems with ice continued to be a serious concern throughout the railway's history. A series of companies took over operations of the C&PRy, including a lease to the shareholders of the Port Hope, Lindsay & Beaverton Railway, who ran a competing line only a few miles away. The new operators surreptitiously sabotaged the bridge, causing it to collapse in 1861.

The southern portion of the line, below Rice Lake, had a second life from 1867 as part of the Cobourg, Peterborough & Marmora Railway & Mining Company. This was a network using the original C&P, a short run known as the Blairton Extension, and the Trent River between the two which was used to ship iron ore from the mines at Marmora to market. The line was successful for some time, until other lines pushed into the Marmora area, while the mines were running out of profitable ore. In 1886, the line was sold again to the Cobourg, Blairton and Marmora Railway & Mining Company, who operated it sporadically before selling it to the Grand Trunk Railway in 1893, who closed it in 1898. The rails were apparently shipped to France during World War I.

Given its early disappearance, unlike many historical railways the C&PRy route was not converted to rail trail use. Most evidence of the line has since disappeared, although remains of the trestle are still visible, and rise from the lake during periods of low water.

== History ==
=== Growth of Central Ontario ===
Most of Ontario was empty wilderness except for a few scattered settlements that formed primarily after the American Revolutionary War when then United Empire Loyalists were given land around the province, but mostly in Prince Edward County, near Kingston, Ontario.

In August 1825, Peter Robinson brought 2,024 Irish immigrants to Canada and decamped them at Cobourg in tents. The immigrants were moved north and started settlements across the area between Cobourg and Rice Lake. Over time the settlements extended northward past the lake, and the town of Peterborough formed in this newly opened area.

=== James Gray Bethune opens transport ===
James Gray Bethune arrived in Cobourg in 1816 and started several enterprises before settling on running a combined general store and post office. He also became the local cashier for the Bank of Upper Canada.

By the late 1820s it was becoming clear that Peterborough was going to be a success, and there was a definite need to provide markets for the burgeoning lumber mills and farms springing up in the area. Port Hope was opening a port for this trade, but construction was hopelessly mired in local politics.

Bethune took advantage of this by building a small streamer on Rice Lake, the Pemedash, later known as the Otonabee. The Otonabee docked at the town of Sully (today known as Harwood) on the southern shore of the lake, and ran north through the Otonabee River to downtown Peterborough. To serve markets further north, a second steamer was built in Peterborough, sawn in half, and transported overland to Lake Chemong, where it ran as far north as Bobcaygeon.

For services north of Bobcaygeon, Bethune proposed building a lock system to bypass a set of rapids. Bethune spent liberally on construction, only to find it didn't have enough water to operate year-round. In 1834 directors of the Bank of Upper Canada arrived to check the books. Bethune appears to have staged a robbery to upset the investigation, and while nothing was proven, 9,000 pounds of loans were put on Bethune personally. Bethune attempted to sell everything he owned to pay the debt, but failed, and died impoverished in Rochester, New York a few years later.

=== Cobourg Rail Road ===
Bethune's steamer network was hampered by the lack of any ability to reach Lake Ontario, a problem for any of the ports in the area. While Bethune was busy setting up the locks, he was also engaged with local businessmen in an effort to build a railway from the Sully dockyard to the port in Cobourg. Bethune was joined by E. Perry and George Strange Boulton, successful local businessmen. In 1831 the group hired F.P. Rubidge, also working on Bethune's lock system, to examine routes from Cobourg to Rice Lake. In 1832, Rubidge returned a proposed route running through several valleys from D'Arcy Street in Cobourg northward to the docks at Sully.

On 6 March 1834 the Cobourg Rail Road Company was chartered to build the line within set times, and given an initial grant of £10,000 to start the work. Stock subscriptions were slow in coming, perhaps due to Bethune's bankruptcy around this time. Additionally, in 1833 the provincial government hired Nicol Hugh Baird to examine the Trent River with hopes for opening it for navigation. This route would also connect to Rice Lake and therefore bypass a railway link, but was also added 77 miles to the route to Toronto, and would take some time to open. In fact, this section was not fully opened until the 1880s. In 1835 the company once again hired Rubidge, this time accompanied by Baird, to re-survey the route. They returned three potential routes, ending in the towns of Bewdley, Claverton (today known as Gore's Landing) and Sully.

The Panic of 1837 and following US recession caused by presidential meddling in the banking system made further subscriptions hard to come by. The Upper Canada Rebellion of 1837 added to the company's woes, and the efforts became moribund. Several attempts to restart construction through the Cobourg Rail Road Company were unsuccessful. The company secured an extension of three years on their building permit in 1836, but by the early 1840s work on the line had still not begun and the charter lapsed.

=== Cobourg Plank Road and Ferry Company ===
With the railway line abandoned, the town again hired Baird in 1842 to survey the route for a plank road to Rice Lake. The newly formed government of The Canadas formed a Board of Works for these sorts of local improvements, and both Cobourg and Port Hope applied for permission to build a route, with Port Hope's plan winning approval. The Peterborough & Port Hope Railway (P&PH) was duly chartered in 1846.

Worried that business from north of the lake would bypass Cobourg, in the spring of 1846 the Cobourg Plank Road and Ferry Company was formed. With initial capital of £6,000, the company purchased 300,000 feet of three-inch wide planks, 12 or 13 feet long. The road was laid along the current route of Burnham Street to Gore's Landing, under the direction of William Weller, the "Stage Coach King", and Thomas Gore as supervisor.

The road proved almost unusable in spring and fall when wet weather made it unable to carry a load. Maintenance suffered, and by 1850 the road was almost unusable. Luckily for Cobourg business interests, the Port Hope efforts had failed, and competition to the plank road had never materialized.

=== Cobourg and Peterborough Railway ===
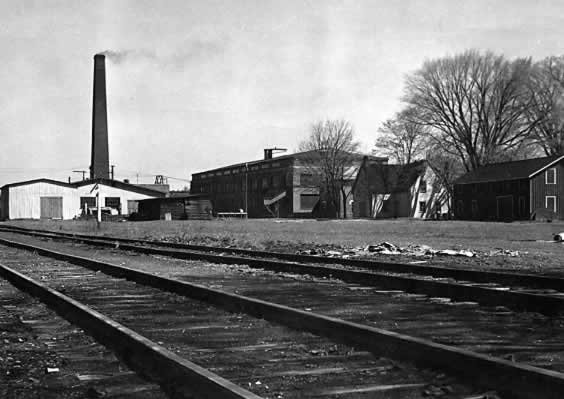
Sod was turned at this location in 1853. The Cossen Car Works grew up on this site, which by this point in 1948 had dwindled to just the foundry.

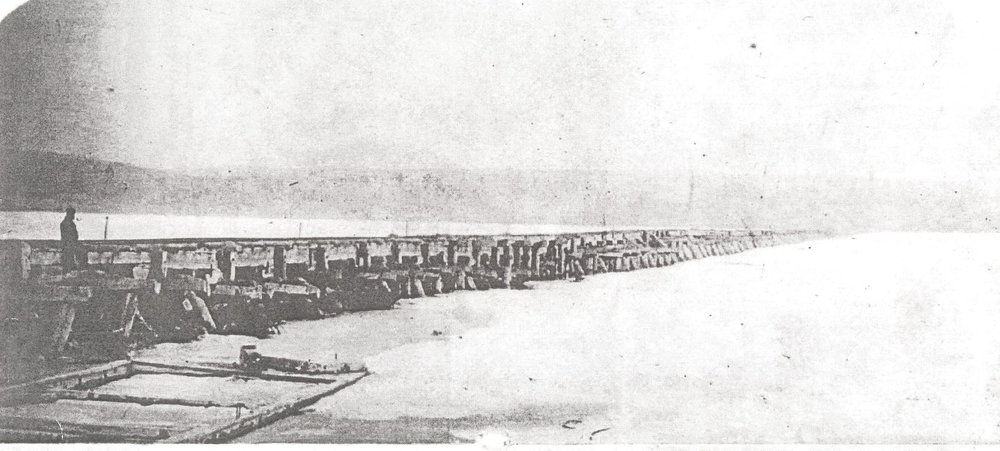
The C&P ran straight across Rice Lake on this causeway and a series of bridges further north.

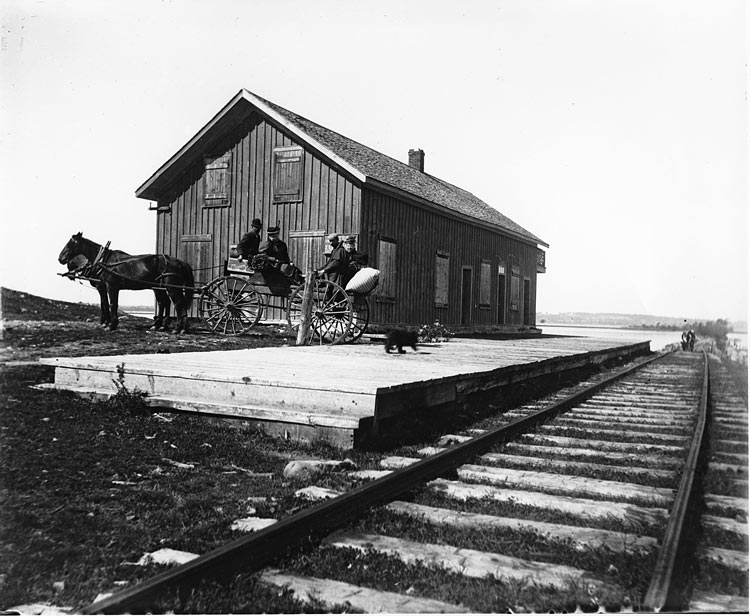
Harwood Station and the causeway to Tic Island, some time after the closure of the Rice Lake crossing.

Soon after the road was rendered useless, a new group led by D'Arcy Boulton Jr. (G.S.'s and Peter Robinson's nephew) restarted efforts to build the railway. This time the plan was to push across Rice Lake and end in Peterborough, at that time a quickly growing industrial town. In the fall of 1850, Andrew Jeffrey was appointed to head a new committee to study the railway. Other members of the group included Boulton, the mayor Ebeneezer Perry, H. Ruttan and T. Dumble. In late 1851 Boulton claimed that a line would be operational in three years.

A new charter for the Cobourg & Peterborough Railway was granted on 10 December 1852, and the town purchased £25,000 of the stock. The engineering was initially offered Samuel Keefer who estimated the cost at £125,000, but could not take the job. It was then offered to Ira Spaulding, who recommended increasing the estimate to £151,000 in light of the costs of the bridge across Rice Lake. A construction contract was offered and picked up by Zimmerman & Balch, Samuel Zimmerman's firm, who signed the contract on 15 January 1853, and threw in £1,000 for good will.

Sod was turned by the new mayor's wife on 7 February 1853, at the corner of what is today the northeast corner of Spring Street and University Avenue (then Railway and Seminary). Work on the bridge started on March 3. Financial problems arose in 1854 with the advent of the Crimean War which created a labour shortage and wages rose to one dollar per twelve-hour day. James Crossen was contracted to build rolling stock, the start of a company that would long outlast the railway itself.

The line reached Harwood in May 1854, and citizens were offered a free ride on the line. Work on the bridge continued through the year. The bridge was the second largest civil engineering project in North America at the time, consisting of a series of trestles, 31 Burr Truss bridges, and a centre pivot draw bridge, extending for two and a half miles across the lake. However, to save money, Zimmerman did not fill in the pilings along the northern sections of the bridge, which were noticed in the spring of 1854 to have shifted due to ice.

The line was opened all the way to Peterborough on 29 December 1854, again with offers of a free ride the 28.5 mile length of the line. The line had only been running for three days when, on 1 January 1855, shifting ice on the lake pushed the bridge and it had to be closed for repairs. The bridge continued to be a serious problem throughout the railway's lifetime. John Fowler was brought in to replace Spaulding, and the bridge was gradually upgraded, starting with the construction of causeways in the shallower portions. Full service was restored in the spring, but by this time poor construction of the southern portions of the line was becoming evident as well.

In spite of any problems, the railway under Boulton's directorship proved extremely lucrative for all involved. Building lots in Harwood jumped from $3 to $400 an acre, and incomes from the line proved to be considerably higher the similar lines in the area.

=== Peterborough & Chemong ===
Through the mid-1800s, what would become the Trent–Severn Waterway was slowly being constructed on the lakes north and west of Peterborough. It would not be complete through Peterborough until 1904, and as a complete waterway until 1920. Nevertheless, by the middle of the 19th century there was already considerable traffic on the canals, but no way to reach markets south or east. This led to the creation of a number of railways whose primary purpose was to act as endpoints for canal traffic to be carried to Toronto.

On 30 May 1855 the Peterborough & Chemong Lake Railway (P&CL) was chartered to connect to the canal system at Lake Chemong, northwest of Peterborough. By the summer of 1859 four miles had been completed from the east side of the Otonabee River across a bridge built between 1867 and 1871, where it crossed the Midland Railway of Canada's branch to Lakefield. A lack of further funding prevented further expansion northward, and the bridge was eventually closed in 1882.

When the Grand Trunk Railway purchased the Midland Railway of Canada they also took over the P&CL on 23 March 1888, and finally completed the line a further four miles to Chemong Lake in 1891, ending at a point known as Bridge Landing (today known as Bridgenorth). This was used for only a short time until it was again abandoned in 1902. (Note: The Historical Society says 1904.) Portions of the line were used in 1915 by Canadian General Electric to test electric locomotives, after which the line was lifted in sections and donated to the Canadian Army's Railway Corps.

=== Changing hands ===
In the summer of 1858 the president of the company, Henry Covert, decided to take over the operations lease from Boulton. The shareholders rejected Covert's plan, and instead handed it to John Henry Dumble, who had some experience from the Grand Trunk Railway (GTR). He raised 5,000 pounds in new funds to upgrade the line and began filling in the remaining portions of the piles.

A major threat to the operations was the construction of a spur from the competing Port Hope, Lindsay and Beaverton Railway (PHL&B), which had started pushing towards Peterborough and reached it on 12 May 1858. In order to ward off this upcoming threat, Dumble arranged contracts with a number of lumber interests in the town to continue using the C&PRy. By 1859 the railway moved 26,000,000 board feet of lumber and the bridge was finally stabilizing.

Meanwhile, Boulton had purchased shares in the PHL&B. Covert entered a partnership with John Fowler, who had bid to lease the C&PRy but lost to Boulton, to lease operations of their Millbrook Branch into Peterborough. In December 1859, J.H. Cameron representing the bondholders, approached Dumble and stated that if he were willing to give up the lease, the line could be leased to the Grand Trunk Railway at a significant profit. He agreed, only to find the next day that the line had not been leased to the GTR, but the shareholders of the Millbrook Branch - Boulton, Covert and Fowler. The new directors immediately laid off the men working to improve the bridge.

In 1860 the town opened their new town hall, Victoria Hall, and invited Prince Albert (the future Edward VII) to attend the official opening. The Duke of Newcastle refused to allow the Prince to cross on the bridge, causing many snide remarks in the Toronto press. The Prince was instead taken across Rice Lake by steamboat, and rejoined the train at Hiawatha on the north side.

The new operators began taking direct action against the Cobourg line. Some time in 1861 they moved the locomotives to their own yards in Port Hope, and then sabotaged the bridge by removing iron bolts and fittings, taking them for use on the Millbrook line. At some point between 1861 and 1863 the main center section of the bridge collapsed.

During a town meeting in 1864, Dumble revealed the successful trickery and sabotage, but offered an optimistic note that the C&PRy still had a shorter route than the Port Hope line, and ended at a better harbour. When Covert was questioned, he claimed that he had removed the iron works for safekeeping, because everyone knew the bridge was going to collapse anyway.

=== Cobourg, Peterborough & Marmora Railway and Mining Company ===
In the late 1840s, the Marmora Iron Works formed as a collection of iron mines in the area around Marmora, Ontario. This was only a few miles from the northern portions of the Trent River where they emptied into Rice Lake. A new plan to service the mines was brought up by W. W. Dean at the 1864 meeting, and in 1865 John Dumble was asked to examine the concept of selling the line to investors for hauling iron. He found an interested party in Pittsburgh, headed by George K. Schoenberger.

The town sold the railway to Schoenberger's group for $100,000. The investors also purchased the entire Marmora works as well, and combined the two to form the Cobourg, Peterborough & Marmora Railway & Mining Company (CP&M&M). In spite of the name, the Peterborough section of the line was not used, however, a new stretch of line from Blairton to Trent River was constructed.

Ore was loaded onto barges on the Trent then hauled up the Trent and across Crowe Lake to the dock in Blairton. The ore was then driven the short distance to Trent River, where the bottom-opening cars would dump the ore into new barges. These were hauled to the dock in Harwood where the ore was hauled uphill on a steam-powered conveyor and loaded into train cars again. The final haul ended on an inclined ramp on the docks in Cobourg, where they ore was again dumped into barges or steamers, typically bound for Rochester.

The line was extremely productive, hauling an average of 300 tons of ore a day. Additionally, the mine's operators came to use Cobourg as their summer cottage areas, greatly increasing the prosperity of the town. The mine's productive period lasted only a short time; the last shipment on the line was in 1878, and mine shut down in 1879. By this point the Marmora area was well served by numerous lines, including the Central Ontario Railway which ran directly to the Grand Trunk lines at Trenton.

=== Cobourg, Blairton & Marmora Railway and Mining Company ===
The residual capital of the original CP&M&M was sold off to the Cobourg, Blairton & Marmora Railway and Mining Company, formed on 23 June 1887. Their interest was primarily in an attempt to connect the Blairton section to the Ontario and Quebec Railway which passed between the two ends of this branch. This was ultimately unsuccessful, and by this time several other lines, notably the Central Ontario Railway which ran directly through the Marmora mines, were providing service in this area.

=== Under the GTR ===
The line was finally sold off to the Grand Trunk on 1 April 1893. The Blairton section was immediately abandoned while the section to Rice Lake continued to be used for passenger service until 1898 when the line was officially closed. Rails were lifted after this period, and apparently shipped to France during World War I. The section between the GTR mainlines and the port in Cobourg were lifted in the 1980s.

=== The route today ===
Due to is early closure and lifting, the C&PRy was closed long before the conversion to rail trails become common. Most of the route has since disappeared. The sections north of Rice Lake are more visible, lately due to these areas remaining in agricultural use, and seeing less residential development. All that remains of the Blairton section are the docks on the Crowe Lake and the Trent. A small section through the Ashburnham section of Peterborough is now used as the Rotary Club Greenway Trail.

Even the bridge is now mostly lost, although this was due largely to the raising of water levels that occurred after the Trent Waterway was finally completed in 1923, and the water levels were lifted to provide more flow into the locks. One portion of the bridge remains visible, stretching from the south shore of Rice Lake at Harwood. It appears as a land causeway, with trees and bushes growing on it.

The Harwood station has since been moved and re-used as a community building in Roseneath.

== Route ==
=== Cobourg to Harwood ===
The railway started on what is today Cobourg's beach area, running northwest across the harbour area before turning north along the line which is now Spring Street. It ran to a point just north of the current Ontario Highway 401 where it turned northeast in a series of curves between Precious Corners and Baltimore. North of Baltimore the line closely follows the current path of Harwood Road, about 50 metres to the west until it reaches Oak Ridges Road, and then on the road's right-of-way for the final two miles into Harwood.

=== Harwood to Hiawatha - the bridge ===
The bridge across Rice Lake starts at the northernmost point of land, on the eastern side of Harwood. Here the causeway ran north-northwest towards Tic Island, then turns very slightly more northward for the remainder of the way to Hiawatha.

The bridge was a 4-kilometer (2.5 mi) long, single-tracked wooden trestle bridge on piles, with 33 truss spans (24 m each) and a 36 m swing section in the navigation between Tic Island and the northern shore.

=== Hiawatha to Peterborough ===
From Hiawatha the line ran roughly northward towards Peterborough, arriving in Ashburnham, on the east side of the Otonabee River. Ashburnham was formerly a separate town, but was annexed by Peterborough.

=== Peterborough to Chemong ===
The final section from Peterborough to Chemong ran due north to meet the lake at a dock north of Smith-Ennismore-Lakefield.

== See also ==
- List of Ontario railways
