= List of Canadian National Railways companies =

The following were component companies of the Canadian National Railways in 1962, or predecessors of such companies:

== A ==
- Acadia Coal Company
- Addison Railroad
- Alberta and Great Waterways Railway
- Alberta Midland Railway
- Albert Railway
- Alexander Gibson Railway and Manufacturing Company
- American Union Telegraph Company
- Amherst and Belchertown Railroad
- Amherst, Belchertown and Palmer Railroad
- Anglo-American Telegraph Company
- Annapolis and Atlantic Railway
- Atlantic and Lake Superior Railway
- Atlantic and St. Lawrence Railroad
- Atlantic, Quebec and Western Railway
- Autoport Limited
- Aquatrain

== B ==
- Baie des Chaleurs Railway
- Barre Granite Railway
- Bay City Terminal Railway
- Bay of Chaleurs Railway
- Bay of Quinte Railway and Navigation Company
- Bay of Quinte Railway
- Beauharnois Junction Railway
- Belleville and North Hastings Railway
- Belt Railway of Chicago
- Bessborough Hotel
- Bessemer and Barry's Bay Railway
- Bethel Granite Railway
- Brantford and Buffalo Joint Stock Railroad
- Brantford, Norfolk and Port Burwell Railway
- Brattleboro and Fitchburg Railroad
- Brattleboro and Whitehall Railroad
- British and American Express Company
- British and North American Express Company
- Brockville, Westport and North-Western Railway
- Brockville and Westport Railway
- Brockville, Westport and Sault Ste. Marie Railway
- Brooksay Realty Company
- Buctouche and Moncton Branch Railway
- Buctouche and Moncton Railway
- Buctouche and Northumberland Strait Railway
- Buctouche Railway and Transportation Company
- Buffalo and Lake Huron Railway
- Buffalo, Brantford and Goderich Railway
- Bulkley and Telkwa Valley Coal Company
- Burk's Falls and French River Railway
- Burlington and Lamoille Railroad
- Burlington and Lamoille Valley Railroad
- Burrard Inlet Tunnel and Bridge Company

== C ==
- Canada Air Line Railway
- Canada Atlantic Railway
- Canada Atlantic Transit Company
- Canada Atlantic Transit Company of U.S.
- Canada Eastern Railway
- Canada, New Brunswick and Nova Scotia Railway
- Canadian Airways
- Canadian Express Company
- Canadian Government Merchant Marine
- Canadian Government Railways
- Canadian Government Railways Employees' Relief and Insurance Association
- Canadian - Minnesota Bridge Company
- Canadian National Electric Railways
- Canadian National Express Company
- Canadian National Hotels
- Canadian National Land Settlement Association
- Canadian National Lines - Niagara Frontier - New York
- Canadian National Railway
- Canadian National Railways - Eastern Lines
- Canadian National Railways (France)
- Canadian National Railways Pension Fund - 1929
- Canadian National Railways Pension Fund - 1935
- Canadian National Railways Radio
- Canadian National Railways Securities Trust
- Canadian National Railways Trust Company
- Canadian National Realties
- Canadian National Rolling Stock
- Canadian National Steamship Company
- Canadian National Telegraph Company
- Canadian National Transfer Company
- Canadian National Transportation
- Canadian National (West Indies) Steamships
- Canadian Northern Alberta Railway
- Canadian Northern Branch Lines Company
- Canadian Northern Coal and Ore Dock Company
- Canadian Northern Consolidated Railways
- Canadian Northern Express Company
- Canadian Northern Manitoba Railway
- Canadian Northern Montreal Tunnel and Terminal Company
- Canadian Northern Ontario Railway
- Canadian Northern Pacific Railway
- Canadian Northern Quebec Railway
- Canadian Northern Railway Arbitration Award
- Canadian Northern Railway
- Canadian Northern Railway Express Company
- Canadian Northern Realties
- Canadian Northern Rolling Stock
- Canadian Northern Saskatchewan Railway
- Canadian Northern Steamships
- Canadian Northern System Terminals (Limited)
- Canadian Northern Telegraph Company
- Canadian Northern Transfer Company
- Canadian Northern Western Railway
- Canadian Yukon Railway
- Cannar Oils
- Canso and Louisburg Railway
- Cape Breton Railway, Coal and Iron Company
- Cape Breton Railway
- Cape Breton Railway Extension Company
- Caraquet and Gulf Shore Railway
- Caraquet Railway
- Carillon and Grenville Railway
- Centmont Corporation
- Central Canada Express Company
- Central Canada Railway
- Central Counties Railway
- Central Ontario Railway
- Central Railway Limited, (N.S.)
- Central Vermont Airways Incorporated
- Central Vermont Railroad
- Central Vermont Railway
- Central Vermont Railway Incorporated
- Central Vermont Terminal Incorporated
- Central Vermont Transit Corporation
- Central Vermont Transportation Company
- Central Vermont Warehouse Incorporated
- Champlain and Connecticut River Railroad
- Champlain and St. Lawrence Railroad
- Champlain and St. Lawrence Railroad (New York)
- Charlottetown Hotel
- Chateauguay and Northern Railway
- Chateau Laurier Hotel
- Chatham Branch Railway
- Chatham Railway
- Cheney, Rice and Company
- Chicago, Detroit and Canada Grand Trunk Junction Railroad
- Chicago and Grand Trunk Railway
- Chicago, Kalamazoo and Saginaw Railway
- Chicago and Kalamazoo Terminal Railroad
- Chicago Lake County Railway
- Chicago and Lake Huron Railroad
- Chicago, New York and Boston Refrigerator Company
- Chicago and North Eastern Railroad
- Chicago and Southern Railroad
- Chicago and State Line Extension Railway
- Chicago and State Line Railway
- Chicago and Western Indiana Belt Railway
- Chicago and Western Indiana Railroad
- Cincinnati, Saginaw and Mackinaw Railroad
- City and Suburban Electric Railway
- Clarke Steamship Company
- Coast Railway of Nova Scotia
- Cobourg, Blairton and Marmora Railway and Mining Company
- Cobourg, Peterborough and Marmora Railway and Mining Company
- Cobourg and Peterborough Railway
- Cobourg Railroad
- Company of Proprietors of the Champlain and St. Lawrence Railroad
- Consolidated Land Corporation
- Consolidated Railroad of Vermont
- Continental Realty and Holding Company
- Coteau and Province Line Railway and Bridge Company
- Crosby Transportation Company

== D ==
- Dalhousie Navigation Company
- Davenport Street Railway
- Detroit Belt Railroad
- Detroit, Grand Haven and Milwaukee Railway
- Detroit and Huron Railway
- Detroit and Huron Railway
- Detroit and Milwaukee Railroad
- Detroit and Milwaukee Railway
- Detroit and Pontiac Railroad
- Detroit Terminal Railroad
- Detroit and Toledo Shore Line Railroad
- Digby and Annapolis Railway
- Dominion Telegraph Company
- Dominion Telegraph Securities
- Drummond County Railway
- Duluth, Rainy Lake and Winnipeg Railway
- Duluth, Virginia and Rainy Lake Railway
- Duluth and Virginia Realty Company
- Duluth, Winnipeg and Pacific Railroad
- Duluth, Winnipeg and Pacific Railway

== E ==
- East Richelieu Valley Railway
- East-West Transport
- Eastern Extension Railway
- Eastern Lands Department
- Eastern Transport
- Edmonton District Railway
- Edmonton, Dunvegan and British Columbia Railway
- Edmonton and Slave Lake Railway
- Edmonton, Yukon and Pacific Railway
- Elgin and Havelock Railway
- Elgin, Petitcodiac and Havelock Railway
- Empire Coal and Mining Company
- Empire Freightways
- Erie, London and Tillsonburg Railway
- European and North American Railway

== F ==
- Federal Properties
- Fenelon Falls Railway
- Flos Tramway Company
- Fort Garry Hotel
- Fredericton and Saint Mary's Bridge Company
- Fredericton and Saint Mary's Railway Bridge Company

== G ==
- Galt and Guelph Railway
- Gananoque, Perth and James Bay Railway
- Gananoque and Rideau Railway
- Gaspe Lines
- Georgian Bay and Wellington Railway
- Grand Haven and Milwaukee Transportation Company
- Grand Junction Railroad
- Grand Junction Railway of Canada
- Grand Junction Railway
- Grand Rapids Terminal Railroad
- Grand Trunk Car Ferry Line
- Grand Trunk Fire Brigade
- Grand Trunk, Georgian Bay and Lake Erie Railway
- Grand Trunk Junction Railway
- Grand Trunk Milwaukee Car Ferry Company
- Grand Trunk Pacific Alaska Steamship Company
- Grand Trunk Pacific Branch Lines Company
- Grand Trunk Pacific Coast Steamship Company
- Grand Trunk Pacific Development Company
- Grand Trunk Pacific Dock Company of Seattle
- Grand Trunk Pacific Railway
- Grand Trunk Pacific Saskatchewan Railway
- Grand Trunk Pacific Telegraph Company
- Grand Trunk Pacific Terminal Elevator Company (Limited)
- Grand Trunk Pacific Town and Development Company
- Grand Trunk - Pennsylvania Transportation Company
- Grand Trunk Pension Fund
- Grand Trunk Radio Communications
- Grand Trunk Railway of Canada
- Grand Trunk Railway Acquisition
- Grand Trunk Railway of Canada East
- Grand Trunk Railway Fire Brigade
- Grand Trunk Railway Insurance and Provident Society
- Grand Trunk Railway Literary and Scientific Institute
- Grand Trunk Railway of Canada Superannuation and Provident Fund
- Grand Trunk Railway Regiment
- Grand Trunk Terminal Warehousing Company
- Grand Trunk Western Railroad
- Grand Trunk Western Railway
- Granville and Victoria Beach Railway and Development Company
- Great American and European Short Line Railway
- Great Eastern Railway
- Great Northern Elevator Company
- Great Northern Construction Company
- Great Northern Railway of Canada
- Great Northern Western Telegraph Company of Canada
- Great Western Railway
- Gulf Shore Railway

== H ==
- Halifax and Cape Breton Railway and Coal Company
- Halifax and Eastern Railway
- Halifax and Guysborough Railway
- Halifax and South Western Railway
- Halifax and Yarmouth Railway
- Hamilton and Lake Erie Railway
- Hamilton and North-Western Railway
- Hamilton and Port Dover Railway
- Hamilton and South Western Railway
- Hamilton and Toronto Railway
- Hampton and Saint Martin's Railway
- Hoar Transport Company
- Harlem Extension Railway
- Harvey Elevator Company
- Hudson Bay Railway
- Huron and Quebec Railway

== I ==
- Imperial Rolling Stock Company
- Indiana Railway
- Industrial Land Company
- Intercolonial and Prince Edward Island Railways Employees, Provident Fund
- Intercolonial Express Company of Canada, (Limited)
- Intercolonial Railway
- Intercolonial Railway Windsor Branch
- International Bridge Company
- International Railway of New Brunswick
- Inverness Coal, Iron and Railway
- Inverness Coal, Field and Railway
- Inverness Railway and Coal Company
- Inverness Railway
- Inverness - Richmond Collieries and Railway of Canada
- Inverness and Richmond Railway
- Irondale, Bancroft and Ottawa Railway

== J ==
- Jacques Cartier Union Railway
- James Bay and Eastern Railway
- James Bay Railway
- Jasper Park Lodge

== K ==
- Kent, Northern Extension Railway
- Kent Northern Railway
- Kingston, Napanee and Western Railway
- Kingston and Toronto Railway
- Kingston, Smiths Falls and Ottawa Railway

== L ==
- Lachine and Hochelaga Railway
- Lachine, Jacques Cartier and Maisonneuve Railway
- Lake Manitoba Railway and Canal Company
- Lake St. Joseph Hotel Company
- Lake St. Louis and Province Line Railway
- Lake Simcoe Junction Railway
- Lake Superior Branch - Grand Trunk Pacific Railway
- Lake Superior Terminals Company
- Lakeside Navigation Company (Limited)
- Lamoille Valley Extension Railroad
- Lawlor Building - Toronto
- Lebanon Springs Railroad
- Lewiston and Auburn Railroad
- Lindsay, Fenelon Falls and Ottawa River Railway
- Liverpool and Milton Railway
- Liverpool and Milton Tramway Company
- London and Gore Railroad
- London and Grand Trunk Junction Railway
- London, Huron and Bruce Railway
- London and Port Sarnia Railway
- Lobtiniere and Megantic Railway
- Louisburg Extension Railway
- Lower Laurentian Railway
- Luscar Coals
- Luscar Collieries

== M ==
- Macdonald Hotel, Edmonton
- Maganetawan River Railway
- Mackenzie Mann and Company
- Malone and St. Lawrence Railway
- Manitoba Northern Railway
- Manitoba Railway
- Manitoba and South Eastern Railway
- Market Gardens
- Marmora Iron Company
- Marmora Railway and Mining Company
- Massena Springs and Fort Covington Railroad
- Maskinonge and Nipissing Railway
- Medonte Tramway Company
- Michigan Air Line Railway
- Michigan Railway
- Middleton and Victoria Beach Railway
- Midland Extension Railway
- Midland Railway of Canada
- Midland Superior Express
- Minnesota and Manitoba Railroad
- Minnesota and Ontario Bridge Company
- Missisquoi Junction Railway
- Missisquoi Railroad
- Missisquoi Valley Railroad
- Moncton and Buctouche Railway
- Moncton and Northumberland Strait Railway
- Montalta Holdings
- Montfort Colonization Railway
- Montfort and Gatineau Colonization Railway
- Montpelier and White River Railroad
- Montreal and Bytown Railway
- Montreal and Champlain Junction Railway
- Montreal and Champlain Railroad
- Montreal and City of Ottawa Junction Railway
- Montreal and European Short Line Railway
- Montreal and Bytown Railway
- Montreal, Chambly and Sorel Railway
- Montreal and Champlain Junction Railway
- Montreal and Champlain Railroad
- Montreal and City of Ottawa Junction Railway
- Montreal and European Short Line Railway
- Montreal Fruit and Produce Terminal Company
- Montreal Island Belt Line Railway
- Montreal and Kingston Railroad
- Montreal and Kingston Railway
- Montreal and Lachine Railroad
- Montreal and New York Railroad
- Montreal, Portland and Boston Railway
- Montreal and Province Line Junction Railway
- Montreal and Province Line Railway
- Montreal Railway Terminus Company
- Montreal and Sorel Railway
- Montreal and Southern Counties Railway
- Montreal Stock Yards Company
- Montreal Telegraph Company
- Montreal Terminal Railway
- Montreal and Vermont Junction Railway
- Montreal Warehousing Company
- Morden and North-Western Railway
- Mountain Park Coals
- Mountain Park Coal Syndicate
- Mount Royal Tunnel and Terminal Company
- Muskegon Railway and Navigation Company
- Musquodoboit Railway

== N ==
- Napanee, Tamworth and Quebec Railway
- National Construction Company (Limited)
- National Terminals of Canada
- National Transcontinental Railway
- National Transcontinental Railway Branch Lines Company
- Nelson Valley Railway and Transportation Company
- New Brunswick and Prince Edward Railway
- New Brunswick and Prince Edward Island Railway
- New England Elevator Company
- Newfoundland Hotel
- Newfoundland Northern and Western Railway
- Newfoundland Railway
- Newfoundland Railway Steamship Services
- New Glasgow Iron, Coal and Railway
- New London Northern Railroad
- New London, Willimantic and Palmer Railroad
- New London, Willimantic and Springfield Railroad
- New Westminster Southern Railway
- Niagara and St. Catharines Street Railway
- Niagara Falls International Bridge Company
- Niagara Falls Suspension Bridge Company
- Niagara Falls, Wesley Park and Clifton Tramway Company
- Niagara, Hamilton and Pacific Railway
- Niagara Lower Arch Bridge Company
- Niagara, St. Catharines and Toronto Navigation Company (Limited)
- Niagara, St. Catharines and Toronto Railway
- Nictaux and Atlantic Railway
- Norfolk Railway
- North Eastern Railway
- North Grey Railway
- North Railway
- North Shore Railway
- North Shore Railway and St. Maurice Navigation Company
- North Simcoe Railway
- Northern Alberta Railways Company
- Northern Consolidated Holding Company
- Northern Extension Railway
- Northern Extension Railways Company
- Northern and North-Western Railway
- Northern, North-Western and Sault Ste. Marie Railway
- Northern and Pacific Junction Railway
- Northern Pacific and Manitoba Railway
- Northern Railroad, (N.Y.)
- Northern Railway, (N.B.)
- Northern Railway of Canada
- Northern Townsites
- Northumberland Straits Tunnel Railway
- North Western Grand Trunk Railway of Illinois and Indiana
- North Western Grand Trunk Railway of Michigan
- Norway Branch Railroad
- Nova Scotia Central Railway
- Nova Scotia Eastern Railway
- Nova Scotia Iron and Steel Company
- Nova Scotia, Nictaux and Atlantic Central Railway
- Nova Scotia Railway
- Nova Scotia Southern Railway
- Nova Scotia Southern Railway
- Nova Scotia Steel and Coal Company
- Nova Scotia Iron and Steel Company
- Nova Scotian Hotel, Halifax

== O ==
- Oakland and Ottawa Railroad
- Ogdensburg and Lake Champlain Railroad
- Ogdensburg Railroad
- Omemee, Bobcaygeon and North Peterborough Junction Railway
- Ontario, Belmont and Northern Railway
- Ontario Car Ferry Company, (Limited)
- Ontario and Ottawa Railway
- Ontario and Rainy River Railway
- Ontario Sault Ste. Marie Railway
- Ontario, Simcoe and Huron Railroad Union Company
- Oshawa Railway and Navigation Company
- Ottawa, Arnprior and Parry Sound Railway
- Ottawa, Arnprior and Renfrew Railway
- Ottawa and Parry Sound Railway
- Ottawa, Rideau Valley and Brockville Railway
- Ottawa Terminals Railway
- Oxford and Port Austin Railroad

== P ==
- Pacific, Northern and Omineca Railway
- Parry Sound Colonization Railway
- Pembina Valley Railway
- Pembroke Southern Railway
- Peninsular Railroad
- Peninsular Railway
- Peninsular Railway - Illinois
- Peninsular Railway - Indiana
- Peninsular Railway - Michigan
- Peninsular Railway Extension Company
- Peterborough and Chemong Lake Railway
- Peterborough and Port Hope Railway
- Petitcodiac and Elgin Branch Railway
- Pleasant Bay Railway
- Polk and 49th Street Junction Railway
- Pontiac, Oxford and Northern Railroad
- Pontiac, Oxford and Port Austin Railroad
- Port Arthur, Duluth and Western Railway
- Port Dalhousie, St. Catharines and Thorold Electric Street Railway
- Port Dalhousie and Thorold Railway
- Port Dover and Lake Huron Railway
- Port Hope, Lindsay and Beaverton Railway
- Port Huron and Indiana Railway
- Port Huron and Lake Michigan Railroad
- Port Huron and Milwaukee Railway
- Port Huron Railroad Tunnel Company
- Port Whitby and Port Perry Railway
- Portage and North-Western Railway
- Portland Elevator Company
- Prescott County Railway
- Preston and Berlin Junction Railway
- Preston and Berlin Railway
- Prince Edward County Railway
- Prince Edward Island Car Ferry Terminals
- Prince Edward Island Ferry Service
- Prince Edward Island Railway
- Prince Charles
- Prince David
- Prince George
- Prince Henry
- Prince John
- Prince Robert
- Prince Rupert Dry Dock and Shipyard
- Prince Rupert Hotel Site
- Prince Rupert
- Prince William
- Public Markets
- Pullin and Copp
- Pullin, Virgil and Company's Express

== Q ==
- Qu'Appelle, Long Lake and Saskatchewan Railroad and Steamboat Company
- Quebec Bridge Company
- Quebec Bridge and Railway
- Quebec and Gosford Railway
- Quebec and James Bay Railway
- Quebec and Lake St. John Railway
- Quebec, Montmorency and Charlevoix Railway
- Quebec, Montreal, Ottawa and Occidental Railway
- Quebec, Montreal and Southern Railway
- Quebec, New Brunswick and Nova Scotia Railway
- Quebec Oriental Railway
- Quebec Railway Bridge Company
- Quebec Railway, Light and Power Company
- Quebec and Richmond Railroad
- Quebec and Saguenay Railway
- Quebec Southern Railway
- Queen Elizabeth Hotel

== R ==
- Rail and River Coal Company
- Rainy River Bridge Company
- Railroad Credit Corporation
- Railway Express Agency, Incorporated
- Realty Assets Company
- Red River Valley Railway
- Reid Newfoundland Company
- Restigouche and Victoria Colonization Railway
- Restigouche and Victoria Railway
- Restigouche and Western Railway
- Rouyn Mines Railway
- Rutland and Burlington Railroad
- Rutland Railroad

== S ==
- Saguenay and Lake St. John Railway
- St. Boniface Western Land Company
- St. Catharines, Merritton and Thorold Street Railway, Company
- St. Catharines and Niagara Centre Railway
- St. Catharines Street Railway
- St. Charles and Huron River Railway
- St. Clair Frontier Tunnel Company
- St. Clair Tunnel Company
- Saint John and Quebec Railway Bridge Company
- Saint John and Quebec Railway
- Saint John and Quebec Railway Trust Company
- Saint John Valley Railway
- Saint John's Dry Dock
- Saint Joseph Valley Railway
- St. Lawrence and Atlantic Railroad
- St. Lawrence, Lower Laurentian and Saguenay Railway
- St. Lawrence and Ottawa Grand Junction Railroad
- St. Louis, Richibucto and Buctouche, Railway
- Saint Martin's Railway
- Saint Martin's and Upham Railway
- Saint Maurice Railway and Navigation Company
- Salisbury and Albert Railway
- Salisbury and Harvey Railway. Company
- Saratoga and St. Lawrence Railroad
- Saskatchewan and North Western Railway
- Saskatchewan Bridge Company
- Saskatchewan Midland Railway
- Saskatchewan North Western Railway
- Shawinigan Falls Terminal Railway
- Societe Immobiliere de la Rue Scribe
- South Chicago and Western Indiana Railroad
- South Norfolk Railway
- South Shore Railway
- Southern New England Railway
- Southern New England Railway
- Southern Vermont Railway
- Stanstead, Shefford and Chambly Railroad
- Stratford and Huron Railway
- Street Railway Construction Company
- Sydney Transfer and Storage

== T ==
- Temiscouata Railway
- Terminal Warehouse and Cartage Company
- Terminal Warehouse Registered
- Terminal Warehouse Company
- Thousand Islands Railway
- Terra Transport
- Thunder Bay Colonization Railway
- Toledo and Ottawa Beach Railway
- Toledo Railway and Terminal Company
- Toledo, Saginaw and Mackinaw Railroad
- Toledo, Saginaw and Muskegon Railway
- Toledo Terminal Railroad
- Toronto Belt Line Railway
- Toronto Dwellings
- Toronto Eastern Railway
- Toronto and Goderich Railway
- Toronto and Guelph Railway
- Toronto and Hamilton Railway
- Toronto, Niagara and Western Railway
- Toronto and Nipissing Eastern Extension Railway
- Toronto and Nipissing Railway
- Toronto and Ottawa Railway
- Toronto - Peterborough Transport Company
- Toronto, Simcoe and Lake Huron Railroad Union Company
- Toronto, Simcoe and Muskoka Junction Railway
- Toronto Suburban Railway
- Toronto Suburban Street Railway
- Toronto Terminals Railway
- Transcontinental Townsite Company

== U ==
- United Counties Railway
- United States and Canada Railroad
- United States and Canada Railway
- United States Social Security Legislation

== V ==
- Vale Coal, Iron and Manufacturing Company
- Vale Railway
- Van Buren Bridge Company
- Vancouver Dock
- Vancouver Hotel Company
- Vancouver Terminal Railway
- Vancouver, Victoria and Eastern Railway and Navigation Company
- Vermont and Canada Railroad
- Vermont Central Railroad
- Vermont and Massachusetts Railroad
- Vermont and Province Line Railroad
- Victoria Bridge
- Victoria Dock
- Victoria Hotel Site
- Victoria Railway

== W ==
- Wacos Holdings
- Waskada and North Eastern Railway
- Waterloo Junction Railway
- Welland Railway
- Wellington and Georgian Bay Railway
- Wellington, Grey and Bruce Railway
- West River Railroad
- Western Extension Railway
- Western Union Telegraph Company
- Western Vermont Railroad
- Weston, High Park and Toronto Street Railway (Limited)
- Whipple Car Company
- Whitby and Port Perry Extension Railway
- Whitby, Port Perry and Lindsay Railway
- Windsor and Hantsport Railway
- Winnipeg Great Northern Railway
- Winnipeg and Hudson Bay Railway
- Winnipeg and Hudson's Bay Railway and Steamship Company
- Winnipeg Land Company
- Winnipeg and Northern Railway
- Winnipeg Transfer Railway (Limited)

== Y ==
- York and Carleton Railway

== See also ==
- CNR Radio
