= Peninsular Railroad =

Peninsular Railroad or Peninsular Railway may refer to:

- Peninsular Railroad (Florida), a predecessor of the Seaboard Air Line Railroad
- Peninsular Railway (Illinois–Indiana–Michigan), a predecessor of the Grand Trunk Western Railroad
  - Peninsular Railroad (Indiana), a predecessor of the above
- Peninsular Railway (California), an interurban subsidiary of the Southern Pacific Company

== See also ==
- Peninsula Railroad (disambiguation)
