= John Davis Barnett =

Canadian librarian (1848–1926)

- John Davis Barnett
- Born: 28 December 1848; London or Liverpool, England
- Died: 1926 (aged 77–78); London, Ontario
- Occupations: Railway Engineer, Librarian, Curator
- Known for: Contributions to the Canadian library community

John Davis Barnett (1848–1926) was an early Canadian curator-librarian. Barnett collected the materials to create one of the significant early personal Ontario libraries and was a vocal proponent of education through the use of freely available printed materials. He is a renowned collector writing extensively on the ideas of inter-library loans, classification scheme trends, the national library for Canada movement, collections development, scientific management theory and his own personal reference theory. Involved with books from an early age he collected widely and worked throughout his life to ensure that knowledge was available to all. His personal donation of some 40,000 volumes to the University of Western Ontario, his work as a lecturer at the first provincial library school and his commitment to the first Ontario library institute make him a notable Canadian librarian from the beginning of the confederation era right through to the period between the two world wars.

== Early life ==
John Davis Barnett, son of George Barnett, was born in 1848 or 1849. Sources have him born in Liverpool, England or London, England. At the age of 17 he emigrated to Montreal, Canada East.

=== Education ===
Barnett studied civil engineering and design under J. Armstrong at Wolverhampton, London and Swindon, England. John’s father, George Barnett had worked in the railroads and made arrangements for his son to study and work in the railroads. In 1919, Barnett was awarded an Honorary Doctorate of Laws, University of Western Ontario.

=== Railroad engineer ===
In 1866 when Barnett emigrated to Canada he became an apprentice in the Grand Trunk Railroad shops in Montreal. With experience in draughting, he quickly moved to the draughting room advancing steadily through the posts in the mechanical side of railroad work. He contributed widely to the engineering journals of North America. His posts included:

- Assistant Mechanical Superintendent, Grand Trunk Railroad
- Mechanical Superintendent, Midland Railway

==== Engineering society memberships ====
- Institute of Mechanical Engineers (UK)
- Engineering Club of London
- American Master Mechanics Association
- Canadian Society of Civil Engineers
- Master Mechanics Institute

== Contributions to Canadian libraries ==
=== Collector ===
John Davis Barnett collected what became a research library with special emphasis on literature, history and science and technology. The Barnett literary collection concentrated on Shakespeariana, literary criticism and classical literature with some foreign works. Monographs, magazines, bulletins, clippings and prints were collected contributing to the collection's diverse nature. In history, Barnett collected a large section on Canadian history, with other large sections of American history. The War of 1812 and the Rebellion of 1837 were of special interest. Government publications are also included in this section. European, African and Asiatic history were also represented. In the science and technology section, Barnett collected everything he could find on railroads and the development of the Canadian railroads.

The main body of the Barnett collection, some 40,000 volumes, was donated to the University of Western Ontario, 10 August 1918. Barnett was actively involved with the collection until 1922. The Barnett collection was presented to the Library and Archives Canada in 1975. Pamphlets and other published material became part of the Public Archives Library; photographs to the National Photography Collection; maps and plans to the National Map Collection.

=== Mechanics' Institutes contributions ===
Barnett was the head of the Grand Trunk Railway Literary and Scientific Institute during the many years he worked for the GTR. Barnett was a strong advocate for the teaching of mechanics. He wrote and spoke frequently about the virtues of providing a venue where knowledge, and especially technical knowledge, could be transferred from one person to another for either professional improvement or personal pursuits.

=== Early Ontario libraries ===
In 1896, Barnett was involved in organizing the Free Public Library in Stratford, Ontario. In 1907, Barnett was a delegate to the first Ontario Library Institute. Twenty-one libraries were represented at a meeting held at the Brantford Public Library and funded by a grant from the Ministry of Education (Ontario). Immediately after the meeting, 10 Institutes districts were formed and in 1908 the Institutes were held. In 1909 an Act was passed providing for permanent establishment of Library Institutes under the Province of Ontario Department of Education. Barnett participated in the early evolution of Ontario public libraries through lectures at Ontario Provincial Library Training School beginning in 1910 and at Ontario Library Institutes.

=== National Library of Canada movement ===
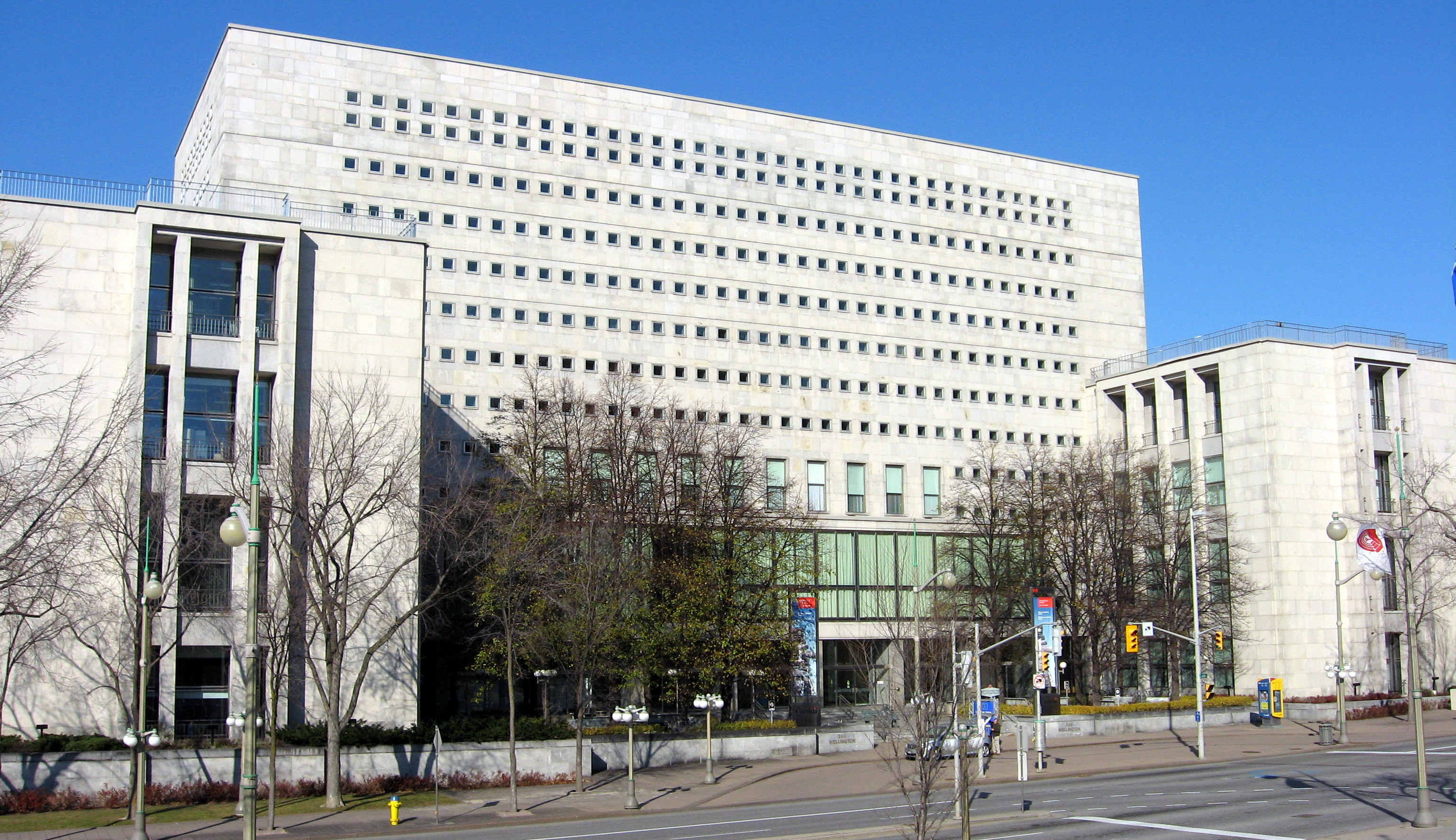
Library and Archives Canada

Barnett was one of the first advocates for a Canadian national library. At the opening of the 20th century the Canadian identity was just awakening and the need for national cultural and educational institutions was beginning to be discussed within the broader political arena. Barnett was vocal in his thoughts. Beginning in 1910, J D Barnett saw the function of a national library as storage, lending and inter-library lending with a leadership role in joint-action agreements between provincial library and a national library with regard to joint functions such as inter-library lending. He saw the primary role of a library as education; a national library’s role within the national educational context. He was also a vocal advocate of advertising any library, but particularly a national library where one had yet to be founded. More controversial at the time, he supported a collections management strategy of quality and not demand. In May 1918 Barnett wrote an article for the Ontario Library Review advocating a national library. Unfortunately timing was not in his favour, and it was not until nearly 20 years after his death that the National Library of Canada was created by an Act of Parliament in 1953 and later as the Library and Archives of Canada.

== Bibliography ==
- Landon, Fred. J. Davis Barnett’s Gift to the Western University. Ontario Library Review. Vol. III, No. 1, (August 1918): 16.
- Landon, Fred. The J. Davis Barnett Library and Inter-Library Loans. Ontario Library Review. Vol. III, No. 3, (February 1919): 64-65.
- Landon, Fred. John Davis Barnett, 1846-1926. Ontario Library Review. Vol. X, No. 4, (May 1926): 75076.
- Landon, Fred. untitled. University of Western Ontario Library Bulletin. Vol. I, No. 1, 1941): 4-8.
- Morgan, Henry James. The Canadian Men and Women of the Time.Toronto: Briggs, 1912.
- Canada. Public Archives of Canada. Barnett, John Davis. Trade Catalogues and Pamphlets. Part I and II. (Pa MG30 B86).
- The Ontario Library Association. An Historical Sketch 1900-1925. Toronto: University of Toronto Press, 1926.
- Canada. Dominion Bureau of Statistics. Annual Survey of Education in Canada, 1928.Ottawa: F. A. Acland, 1930.
- Bow, Eric C. The Public Library Movement in Nineteenth Century Ontario. Ontario Library Review 66 (Mar 1982): 1-16.
- Toronto. Toronto Mechanics. 47 Vic 1884 (Sessional Papers No 14.)
