= Peninsula Railroad =

Peninsula Railroad may refer to:

- Peninsula Railroad (Maryland–Virginia), see list of Maryland railroads and list of Virginia railroads
- Peninsula Railroad of Michigan, see list of Michigan railroads

== See also ==
- Peninsular Railroad (disambiguation)
