= Niagara, St. Catharines and Toronto Railway =

Interurban railway in Ontario, Canada

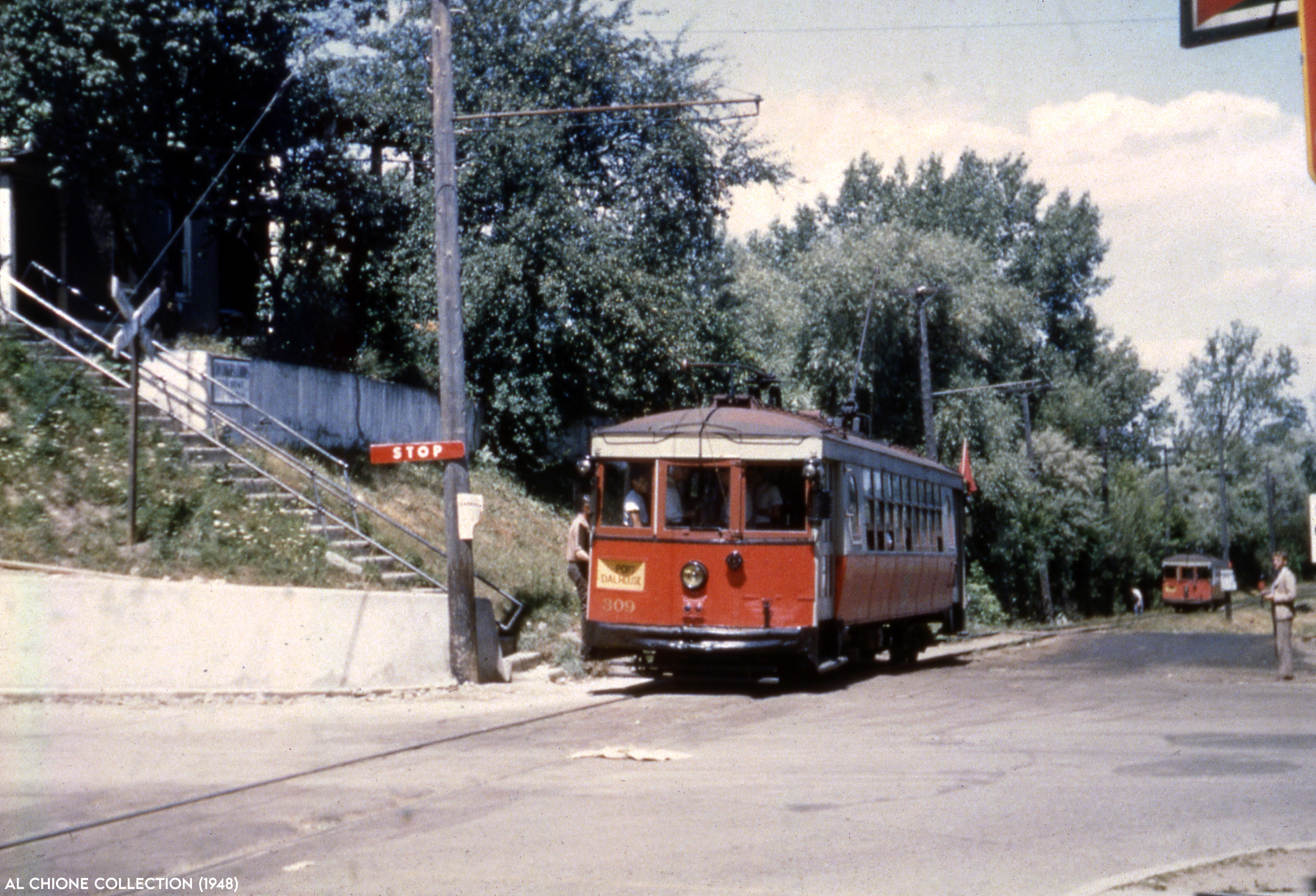
- Car #309 near Port Dalhousie in 1948.

Overview
- Headquarters: St. Catharines, Ontario
- Reporting mark: NS&T
- Locale: Niagara Region, Ontario, Canada
- Dates of operation: 1899–1959

Technical
- Track gauge: 4 ft 8 1/2 in (1,435 mm) standard gauge

The Niagara, St. Catharines and Toronto Railway (reporting mark NS&T) was an interurban radial electric railway in the Niagara Peninsula of Southern Ontario, Canada. It operated from 1899 to 1959. It was based in St. Catharines and had lines to Niagara-on-the-Lake, Port Dalhousie, Niagara Falls, Thorold, Welland and Port Colborne.

== History ==
The NS&T was created in 1899 when a previous railway, the St. Catharines and Niagara Central Railway, was reorganized. The new railway was originally under U.S. ownership but was sold to a Toronto group in 1904. The initial layout was about 32 km. This was mainly between St. Catharines, Thorold, and Port Dalhousie. Several plans were made to extend the rail network to Hamilton and Toronto; however, none of them were successful. This included a plan to build a radial network along hydro rights of way. This plan was encouraged by hydro pioneer, Sir Adam Beck, but provincial and municipal subsidy requests were turned down and the plan died on the drafting table.

In 1908, control passed to the Canadian Northern Railway. When Canadian Northern experienced financial difficulties, the government decided to take it over and in 1918 it was renamed the Canadian National Railway.

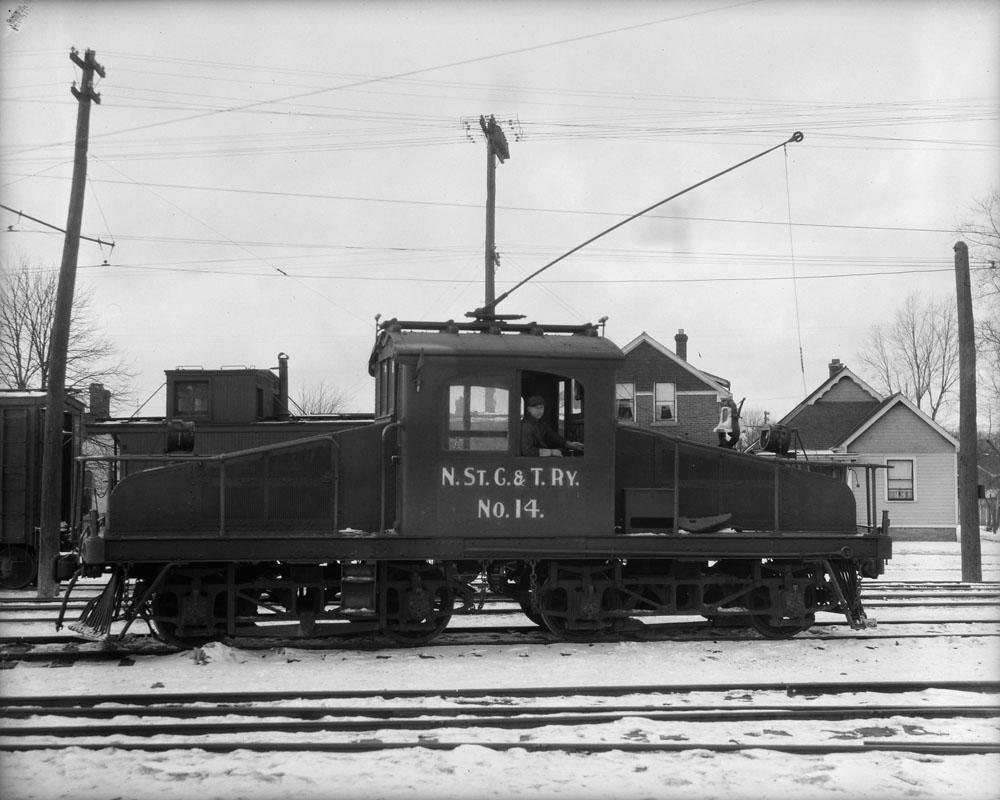
NS&T electric locomotive (1927)

In 1923, CNR formed a subsidiary called Canadian National Electric Railways which placed the NS&T, the Toronto Suburban Railway, the Toronto Eastern Railway and the Oshawa Railway under the same administration. Since the only connection among them was that they were all electric railways, the NS&T retained its name during subsequent operations.

The rail network was expanded to Port Colborne in the mid-1920s and much repair work was done on the existing track. The NS&T started running buses in 1929 to complement its rail network, but by the mid-1930s, buses started to replace some of the rail service. During the Second World War, the rail service experienced heavy use as bus fuel was rationed.

After the war, a program of dieselisation started to replace many of the electric trams but the decline of the railway continued. Two of the main lines were replaced by buses in 1951 and 1954 and passenger rail service stopped altogether in 1959.

The NS&T amalgamated with the CNR in 1960 and ceased operations as a separate entity.
