= Section 145 of the Constitution Act, 1867 =

Provision of the Constitution of Canada

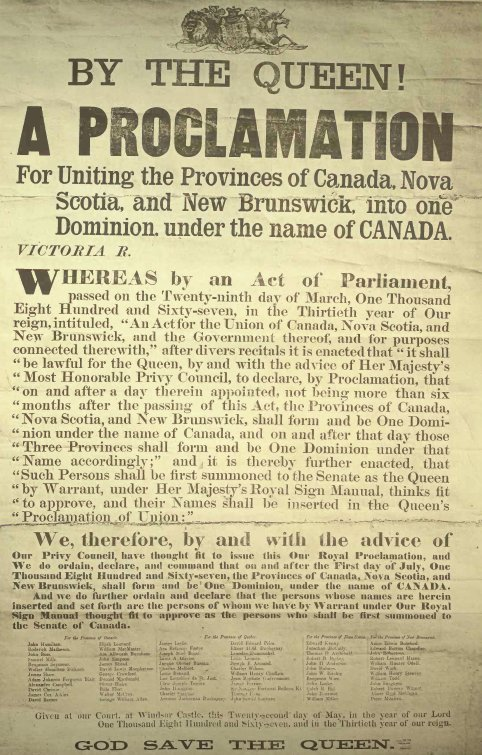
Royal Proclamation which brought the Act into force on July 1, 1867

Section 145 of the Constitution Act, 1867 (French: article 145 de la Loi constitutionnelle de 1867) is a repealed provision of the Constitution of Canada which required the federal government to build a railway connecting the River St. Lawrence with Halifax, Nova Scotia.

The Constitution Act, 1867 is the constitutional statute establishing Canada as a federation. Originally named the British North America Act, 1867, the Act continues to be the foundational statute for the Constitution of Canada, although it has been amended many times since 1867. It is now recognised as part of the supreme law of Canada.

== Constitution Act, 1867 ==
The Constitution Act, 1867 is part of the Constitution of Canada and thus part of the supreme law of Canada. It was the product of extensive negotiations by the governments of the British North American provinces in the 1860s. The Act sets out the constitutional framework of Canada, including the structure of the federal government and the powers of the federal government and the provinces. Originally enacted in 1867 by the British Parliament under the name the British North America Act, 1867, in 1982 the Act was brought under full Canadian control through the Patriation of the Constitution, and was renamed the Constitution Act, 1867. Since Patriation the Act can only be amended in Canada, under the amending formula set out in the Constitution Act, 1982.

== Text of section 145 ==
Section 145 has been repealed. As originally enacted in 1867, it read:

Duty of Government and Parliament of Canada to make Railway herein described
145 Inasmuch as the Provinces of Canada, Nova Scotia, and New Brunswick have joined in a declaration that the construction of the Intercolonial Railway is essential to the consolidation of the Union of British North America, and to the assent thereto of Nova Scotia and New Brunswick, and have consequently agreed that provision should be made for its immediate construction by the Government of Canada : Therefore, in order to give effect to that agreement, it shall be the duty of the Government and Parliament of Canada to provide for the commencement, within six months after the Union, of a railway connecting the River St. Lawrence with the City of Halifax in Nova Scotia, and for the construction thereof without intermission, and the completion thereof with all practicable speed.

Section 145 was the only section in Part X of the Constitution Act, 1867, dealing with the intercolonial railway. It was repealed in 1893 by the Statute Law Revision Act 1893, a statute of the British Parliament. There is no indication that the British government consulted the government of Canada about the repeal.

== Origins of the provision ==
Proposals for a railway linking the Province of Canada to the Maritime provinces had circulated in British North America long before Confederation. One of the earliest proposals was made by Lord Durham in his 1838 report. He recommended the construction of a railway linking Lower Canada with New Brunswick and Nova Scotia, as part of a general union of the British North American colonies.

The distance by land between Rivière-du-Loup on the St. Lawrence and Halifax is approximately 815 kilometres. The proposed railway would be significant for trade, giving the Province of Canada an all-season route to ice-free Halifax Harbour, and increasing trade and transportation for New Brunswick and Nova Scotia. It would also be significant for the defence of British North America, by providing a railway link that would not run through American territory. The defence purposes of the railway were heightened during the American Civil War, when events such as the Trent Affair and the St. Albans Raid heightened tensions between the United States and the United Kingdom. In the winter, the only way to transport British troops from Quebec to the Maritimes was by horse-drawn sleigh.

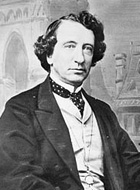
John A. Macdonald, whose comments in the Confederation Debates seemed to cast doubt on the inclusion of the Intercolonial Railway in the constitution

There had been some initial discussions for the railway among the provinces in the early 1860s, but the prospects for a railway dimmed in 1863 when the Province of Canada withdrew from the discussions because of the cost. The matter was raised again in 1864 at the Quebec Conference, where the delegates agreed that the Intercolonial Railway would be part of the Confederation proposal. At the insistence of the Maritime delegates, the Quebec Resolutions included a requirement that the new federal government would build the railway. However, in the subsequent debates in the Parliament of the Province of Canada in 1865 on the Confederation project, John A. Macdonald, one of the co-premiers of the province, appeared to back away from that commitment, weakening support for Confederation in the Maritimes, particularly New Brunswick which was in the middle of an election. Macdonald's comments were felt to have contributed to the victory of the Anti-Confederate party in the New Brunswick election of 1865.

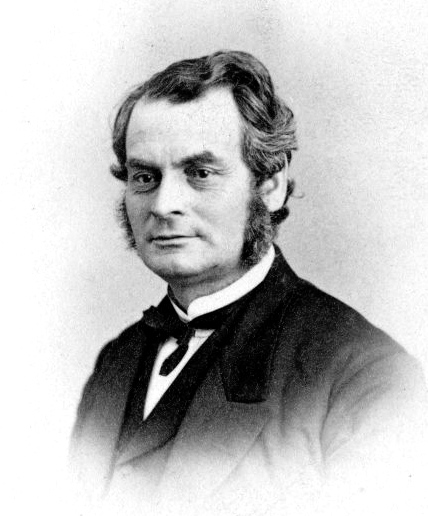
Samuel Tilley of New Brunswick, delegate to the London Conference, who insisted that the Intercolonial Railway be included in the constitution

The final stage of the process leading to Confederation was the London Conference of 1866, a meeting of delegates from the Province of Canada, New Brunswick, and Nova Scotia. The Maritime delegates came to London seeking adjustments to the proposed Confederation plan, to satisfy concerns that had been raised by residents of those provinces in discussions on the proposal. At the first day of the conference, Leonard Tilley, one of the New Brunswick delegates, firmly stated that New Brunswick would only participate if the construction of the railway was part of the plan for union. The Conference immediately accepted that point. The construction of the railway was included in the final resolutions produced by the London Conference. The commitment was then included in the bill prepared by the British government and introduced in the British Parliament.

== Related provisions ==
One of the significant issues relating to the construction of the Intercolonial Railway was the cost, which had contributed to the Province of Canada backing away from the proposal in 1863. The British North American governments therefore sought financial assistance from the British government to build the Intercolonial. In 1862, the British government had indicated that it would not contribute to the construction costs directly, but would guarantee the interest on the loan which would be needed to fund the construction.

This arrangement was again proposed in 1867, and was implemented by an act passed by the British Parliament. The Canada Railway Loan Act 1867 committed the British government to guarantee the interest on a loan to be issued by the new federal government for the construction of the Intercolonial, up to a loan value of £3,000,000.

== Construction of the Intercolonial Railway ==
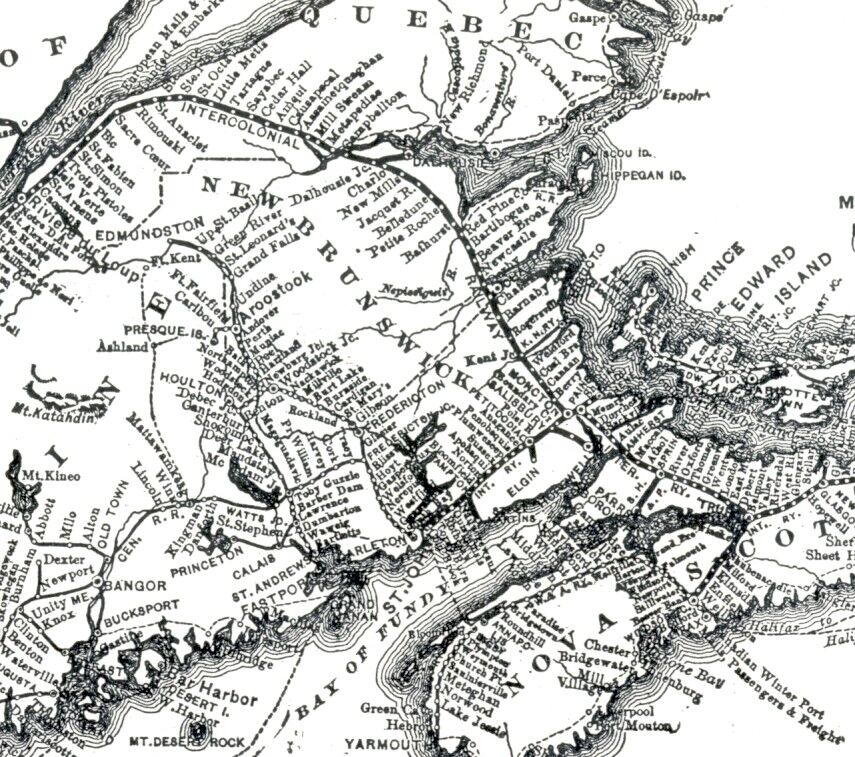
Route of the Intercolonial Railway, 1877

The federal government began building the railway shortly after Confederation in 1867, as a public works project. Because of its significance for national defence, the railway was built along Chaleur Bay, on the east coast of New Brunswick, as far from the United States as possible. The Intercolonial Railway was completed in 1876, and was operated as a federal public work for many years. It was eventually incorporated into the Canadian National Railways, a federal Crown corporation, in 1918.

== Repeal ==
Section 145 was repealed by the British Parliament in 1893, in the Statute Law Revision Act 1893. The revision act was of a "housekeeping" nature, repealing statutory provisions which no longer had any purpose. Since the Intercolonial Railway had been constructed by 1876, section 145 was no longer needed and was repealed. The Canada Railway Loan Act 1867 was also repealed by the 1893 Act, as the loan had been paid off and the interest guarantee was no longer needed.
