= Moncton and Buctouche Railway =

Railway in New Brunswick, Canada

Map

The Moncton & Bouctouche Railway was a historic railroad company in the province of New Brunswick, Canada. It was founded in 1883, at first as a Bouctouche and Moncton Railway, and built a 30-mile-long (48 km) section which branched off at Bouctouche Junction to the east of Moncton, New Brunswick, on the Intercolonial Railway, and continued north to Bouctouche, New Brunswick. The rail line was opened on 1 September 1887, and extended in the next year to Moncton, crossing the Intercolonial in Bouctouche Junction. The road had to fight with economic problems and was put up for compulsory auction in the end of 1894. The M&BR was bought by the Canadian government and was integrated into the Canadian Government Railways (CGR). In the same year Bouctouche Junction was abandoned to Moncton and purchased by a private enterprise. The Canadian National Railway, which had been formed from various mergers in 1918–24, including the CGR, closed the line to Bouctouche on 1 January 1965.
