= Toronto Suburban Railway =

Railway operator in Toronto, Canada

Toronto Suburban Railway Company
Overview
- Locale: Toronto
- Dates of operation: 1891–1931

Technical
- Track gauge: from 1917 to end: 4 ft 8 1/2 in (1,435 mm) standard gauge
- Previous gauge: from start to 1917: 4 ft 10 3/4 in (1,492 mm) (Toronto-gauge)

The Toronto Suburban Railway was a Canadian electric railway operator with local routes in west Toronto, and a radial (interurban) route to Guelph.

== History ==
=== Corporate timeline ===
The Weston, High Park and Toronto Street Railway Company was incorporated in 1890, and changed its name to the City and Suburban Electric Railway Company the next year. The Davenport Street Railway Company was incorporated in 1891. In 1894, the Toronto Suburban Street Railway Company was incorporated and acquired these two companies, giving it 7.5 miles (12.1 km) of lines in the northwestern suburbs of Toronto. In 1900, the company name was shortened to Toronto Suburban Railway Company, and in 1904 it was authorized to extend its operations to Hamilton, the Niagara Peninsula, Brampton, Guelph and Woodbridge. The Township of Etobicoke also granted the TSR a franchise to cover the full length of Dundas Street within its limits, west of the Humber River. Expansion plans were hampered because of the shortness of capital and labour, as well as by potential takeover interest by the Hydro-Electric Power Commission of Ontario, but it did convert its power source from internally generated 500V DC from its own plant, to high-voltage AC power from Niagara Falls.

Allan Royce was the largest shareholder of the TSR, eventually gaining a controlling interest. In 1911, that was sold to William Mackenzie and Donald Mann, who incorporated it into the quickly-expanding Canadian Northern Railway system. At that time, Sir Adam Beck of Ontario Hydro and Henry Thornton of Canadian National Railways had also expressed an interest in the TSR.

In April 1915, the company was authorized to operate all day on Sundays, and to be able to transport milk on the Lord's Day as well.

Under the Municipal Electric Railway Act, 1922, local municipalities were authorized to operate radial lines, or enter into agreements with Ontario Hydro to do so, as part of a larger plan to create a radial network spanning the Greater Golden Horseshoe region, but that did not take place with respect to the TSR lines as that measure was rejected by Toronto voters in a plebiscite held on 1 January 1923, and the issue was not pressed by the Province as the government was subsequently defeated in the 1923 general election. However, routes inside the city were purchased by the City of Toronto in 1923, which then turned them over to the Toronto Transportation Commission. The TTC did upgrade the city routes, and operated the Lambton, Weston and Davenport lines for some years, connecting them with the St. Clair and Dundas routes. In the same year, TSR was amalgamated with the Toronto Eastern Railway, leaving the Canadian National Electric Railways (CNER) with the Guelph and Woodbridge lines.

In 1924, the Township of York acquired the TSR's track within its boundaries, which subsequently became the Township of York Railways. These lines were managed under contract by the Toronto Transportation Commission but with the TofYR paying all capital costs and any operating deficits. Track within the Town of Weston was subsequently transferred to the TofYR in 1925.

The Canadian National Electric Railways let the TSR bond interest go unpaid on 15 July 1931, causing the Guelph line to go into receivership and be shut down on 15 August 1931. Eventually, in 1934, CNER paid off the bondholders at 25 cents on the dollar, following which the receivership was ended on 13 September 1935, and the line was promptly dismantled and equipment disposed.

=== Operational timeline ===
This is a summarized timeline with more details found in the Routes section.

| 1892 | Davenport route started running from Keele and Dundas Streets to Davenport Road and Bathurst Street. This was the first TSR route. |
| April, 1893 | Crescent route began operation running from Keele and Dundas Streets via Dundas Street, south to Evelyn Crescent. |
| 1894 | Service began on Weston line from Keele and Dundas Streets to the then Village of Weston. |
| 1896 | Lambton route opened from Keele and Dundas Streets west on Dundas Street to Lambton. |
| 10 October 1914 | Woodbridge line started operating from Keele and Dundas Streets via the village of Weston to Woodbridge. This was effectively an extension of the Weston line. |
| by January, 1917 | TSR converted all lines from 4 ft 10 7/8 in (1,495 mm) to 4 ft 8 1/2 in (1,435 mm) standard gauge. |
| 14 April 1917 | Guelph line opened running from Keele and Dundas Streets to Guelph. |
| 1923 | Toronto Transportation Commission acquired the Lambton and Davenport lines and converted them to Toronto gauge. |
| 1923 | TTC took over operation of Weston line, completing the conversion of the line to Toronto gauge to Weston by November, 1925. This isolated the standard-gauge line to Woodbridge. |
| 28 November 1923 | Crescent route closed south of Dundas Street due to poor ridership. |
| 1925 | New entrance into Toronto was opened connecting Lambton to Keele Street and St. Clair via private right-of-way. |
| 1925 | TSR opened Eldorado Park in order to spur Sunday ridership. |
| 1926 | Woodbridge line was closed. |
| 15 August 1931 | Guelph line closed. |

=== Today ===
Since the TSR's closure, the right-of-way has become popular for strolling and hiking. From 1970, the Guelph Hiking Trail Club was formed to establish and maintain a formal trail on it between the Bruce Trail at Limehouse and Guelph. A small part of the Guelph line's right-of-way is used by the Halton County Radial Railway museum. The areas where tracks were once located include the walking trails along the south bank of the Eramosa River, the Smith Property loop in Puslinch and the Halton County Radial Railway site on Guelph Line, in the old Township of Nassagaweya.

A power house on Weston Road is now a lumber store and a power house on James Street East in Guelph has been converted to residential use.

The remains of a TSR bridge can still be found in the Meadowvale neighbourhood of Mississauga, Ontario. In Halton Hills, the railbed can be readily seen running parallel to the Canadian National track between Acton and Limehouse.

== Routes ==
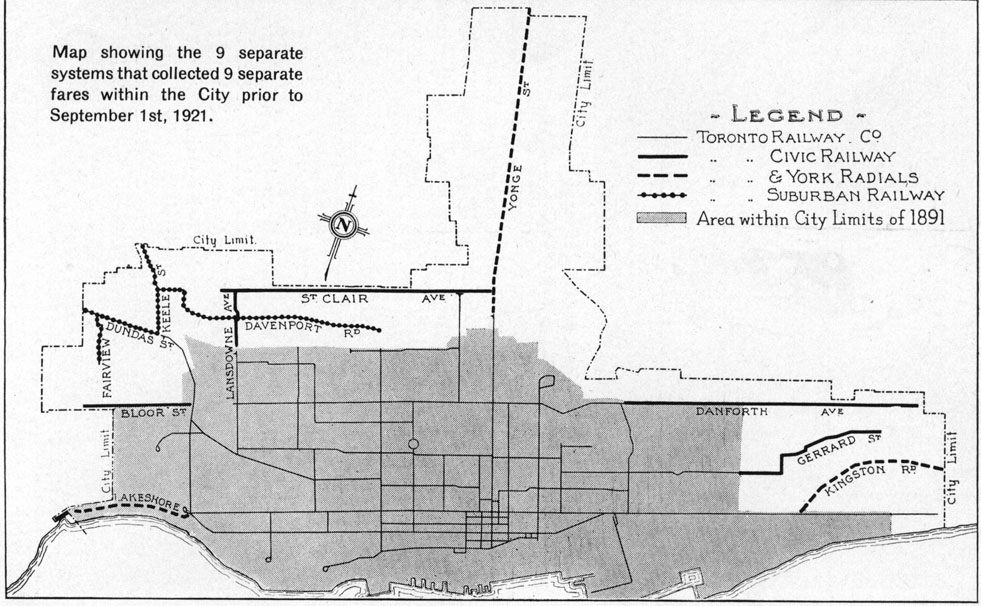
1921 map of electrified rail lines serving Toronto at that time

The Toronto Suburban operated one radial and five city routes during its existence. The following route descriptions are in opening date order.

=== Davenport ===
The Davenport route commenced service on 6 September 1892. From Keele and Dundas Streets (in The Junction neighbourhood), the route ran north on Keele Street, east on St. Clair Avenue, south on Ford Street, east on Davenport Road and then south on Bathurst Street ending north of the CPR near today's Hillcrest Complex. This was a single-track line laid in the middle of the street with a passing siding just east of Lansdowne Avenue. From 1917, the Toronto Civic Railway's line on Lansdowne Avenue had a flat crossing with the Davenport line protected by interlocking signals. The Davenport line used express cars to transport milk from the west to dairies at the eastern end of the line.

On 15 November 1923, the Toronto Transit Commission took over the Davenport line, then double-tracked the line and converted it to Toronto gauge. The TTC decided to abandon the TSR track on St. Clair Avenue and Ford Street and to build a new alignment west on Davenport Road from Ford Street, then north on Old Weston Road to the new Townsley Loop at Townsley Street. The former TSR route was split between the TTC Davenport route to Dovercourt Road, and the northern portion of the Dovercourt route to Bathurst Street.

=== Crescent ===
In April, 1893, the Crescent route began operation running from Keele and Dundas Streets, west on Dundas Street, south on Gilmour Avenue, east on Louisa Street (today St. Johns Road), south on the unpaved Fairview Avenue to Evelyn Crescent. The line was single-track in the middle of the street. About 1894, the line was extended east of Keele and Dundas Streets to Humberside Avenue to meet the streetcars of the Toronto Railway Company. However, in 1899, the TSR sold this extension to the TRC, which extended its operations to a wye-shaped junction at Keele and Dundas Streets. This junction was used by both the TSR and the TRC as both were Toronto gauge at that time. The Crescent route was closed on 28 November 1923 due to poor ridership, and track along Fairview Avenue was removed.

=== Weston ===
The Weston line was constructed in 1894. From Keele and Dundas Streets, the line followed the Davenport route to St. Clair Avenue where a switch allowed the Weston route to proceed north along Weston Road to Church Street in the village of Weston, reaching this terminus on 10 November. Later, the line would be extended a further 1,000 ft (300 m) to the Weston post office. The line ran mostly on the side of the road, but within the village of Weston it ran in the centre of the street. The line was single-track with passing sidings at Seneca Avenue, Buttonwood Avenue and King Street (Weston). In 1923, the Toronto Transportation Commission took over operation of the line to Weston. After converting the line back to Toronto gauge, through service from Keele and Dundas Streets to Humber Street in Weston started on 28 November 1925. On 13 September 1948, the TTC replaced the Weston streetcars with trolley buses.

=== Lambton ===
In 1896, the Lambton line was built as an extension of the Crescent Line along Dundas Street west of Gilmour Avenue, across Scarlett Road, down Lambton Hill to a loop in an open field on the east side of the Humber River. The route ran from Keele and Dundas west on Dundas Street to Lambton. The Lambton line had a passing siding at Willard Avenue.

It was recorded that when the car swung around the Lambton loop "that the conductor would holler to the motorman to go slow around it so he could have a quick thirst-quencher ..." as the car passed the Lambton Hotel where passengers often waited.

In 1923, the Toronto Transportation Commission took over the line from Keele Street to Runnymede Road, and later to the Lambton Loop, converting the line back to Toronto gauge in 1924. The line was closed on 17 August 1928 being replaced by bus service.

=== Woodbridge ===
The Woodbridge line was built as a 7.9 mi (12.7 km) extension of the Weston line. It commenced operation on 10 October 1914. North of Weston, the line was essentially a cross-country rural trolley ending in Woodbridge with a short spur and a wooden shelter as a terminal on Pine Street (now Woodbridge Avenue) east of Wallace Street and just west of Humber River. There were passing sidings at Vaughan Town Line (Steeles Avenue east of Kipling), Thistletown and Albion Road as well as Kipling and Albion. From Keele and Dundas Streets to Woodbridge, the line was 12.02 mi (19.34 km) long. After the Toronto Transportation Commission converted the Weston line to Toronto gauge starting in 1923, the northern part of the standard gauge Woodbridge line was cut off from the old TSR system. The Woodbridge line closed in 1926.

=== Guelph ===
The Guelph line ran from Keele and Dundas Streets to the Grand Trunk Railway station in Guelph. All intermediate stations except Limehouse had a passing siding. Service on the line was every two hours. The first streetcar arrived in Guelph on 12 August 1917. In the city, the trains travelled down Gordon Street to Bay Street (now James Street East), followed the Eramosa River to Speedwell, near the access to the Prison Farm.

From April, 1926, there was hourly weekday service east of Georgetown. When the Toronto Transportation Commission took over all TSR lines within the Toronto city limits and converted them back to Toronto gauge, the TSR's Lambton Carhouse became the Toronto terminus of the Guelph line. In 1925 the route was extended to a new station at Keele Street and St. Clair, situated between the TTC's streetcar loop and the CNR tracks. It was connected by new off-street track from Lambton.

In 1925, The TSR opened Eldorado Park in order to spur Sunday ridership. The TSR owned this 100-hectare (250-acre) recreational property, which was located on the Credit River near Churchville. One period photo shows a 12-coach train pulled by electric locomotive number 300 bound for Eldorado Park.

By 1931, the Guelph line was only carrying 300 daily passengers, compared to 1,662 cars and nine buses per day travelling along the essentially parallel Highway 7. A bond interest default caused the Guelph line to go into receivership and be shut down on 15 August 1931. After receivership ended on 13 September 1935, the line was promptly dismantled.

== Carhouses ==
The TSR's first carhouse was built on the south side of St. Clair Avenue just west of Old Weston Road. It had a loop to turn single-end cars. It closed in 1923.

Lambton Carhouse, the second TSR carhouse, was opened to service the Guelph radial cars as well as local cars. It was next to Lambton Park and just west of Scarlett Road on the south side of the CPR main line. The car barn and shops were in a large brick building that had six tracks. The facility had some yard tracks and a wye.

The Woodbridge line had its own temporary barn on the Massey-Harris Co. property (on Weston Road) from November, 1923 until May, 1926 when the Woodbridge line was closed.

== Track gauge ==
The TSR originally used Toronto gauge which allowed the TSR and the Toronto Railway Company to share tracks at Dundas and Keele Streets. By January, 1917, the TSR had converted all lines to standard gauge because it wanted to interchange freight cars with steam railways. However, very little such traffic materialized on the TSR. The new Guelph line would use standard gauge from its first day, which would allow the TSR Guelph line to enter downtown Guelph via the tracks of the Guelph Radial Railway, a standard gauge streetcar system. After August, 1912, the tracks at Dundas and Keele Streets were rearranged so that the standard gauge track of the TSR (running between west and north of the intersection) crossed a new Toronto gauge wye for reversing TRC streetcars coming from the east.

== Rolling Stock ==
The cars were constructed at the Preston Car Company. Car 101, for example, was equipped with 68 seats affair with cherry wood finish throughout, an overhead luggage rack and a button to signal when a passenger wished to disembark at the next stop. The Main Room included green, plush, upholstered, high-backed seats with headrests, footrests and polished bronze handles on the aisle sides. The Smoking Room was equipped with low-backed seats of imitation leather. The motorman's compartment was at the front.

The one remaining TSR car is number 24, built in 1914, reusing an 1897-vintage Taylor truck. After the TSR was absorbed by the CNR in 1923, the car was renumbered as CN 15702 and used at Neebing Yard in Fort William, Ontario. It was retired in the 1960s, donated to the Canadian Railway Museum, leased to the Edmonton Radial Railway Society (ERRS) in 1989 then sold to ERRS on April 7, 2022. It has been fully restored and is in operation at Fort Edmonton Park.

| Number | Built | Builder | Trucks | Type | Route | Notes |
|---|---|---|---|---|---|---|
| 1 | | | DEST | city line car | | 1–17 in service by 1911 |
| 2 | | | DEST | sweeper | | |
| 3 | | | | | | known to have existed |
| 4 | | | | | | known to have existed |
| 5 | | | | | | no details |
| 6 | | | | | | no details |
| 7 | | | | | | no details |
| 8 | | | | open | | |
| 9 | | | | | | no details |
| 10 | | | | open | | |
| 11 | | | DEST | open | | |
| 12 | | | DEST | closed | | |
| 13 | | | | open | | |
| 14 | | | | | | known to have existed |
| 15 | | TRCo | DEST | | LAMBTON | |
| 16 | | | | | spare | for CRESCENT or LAMBTON |
| 17 | | | DEST | | LAMBTON | |
| 18 | | | | | WESTON | no details |
| 19 | | | DEDT | | WESTON | |
| 20 | | | | | WESTON | |
| 21 | | | | | WESTON | |
| 22 | | TRCo | DEST | | CRESCENT | |
| 23 | | | | | CRESCENT | |
| 24 | 1914 | Preston | DEST | | DAVENPORT | to Canadian National Railways 15702 in 1923; see above (now with ERRS) |
| 25 | | | DEST | | DAVENPORT | |
| 26 | | | | | WOODBRIDGE | |
| 27 | | | | | WOODBRIDGE | |
| 28 | | TRCo | DEDT | | COOKSVILLE | |
| 29 | | TRCo | DEDT | | COOKSVILLE | |
| 30 | | | DEDT | semi-convertible | WESTON | ex-Tuscaloosa, AL |
| 31 | | | DEDT | semi-convertible | WESTON | ex-Tuscaloosa, AL |
| 32 | | | DEDT | semi-convertible | | ex-Tuscaloosa, AL |
| 33 | | | DEDT | semi-convertible | WESTON | ex-Tuscaloosa, AL |
Guelph Radial Cars
| 101 | 1915 | Preston | SEDT | centre entrance | GUELPH | rebuilt to DE in 1924-25 |
| 102-103 | 1915 | Preston | SEDT | centre entrance | | burnt in storage before delivery |
| 104-106 | 1915 | Preston | SEDT | centre entrance combine | GUELPH | rebuilt to DE in 1924-25 |
| 107 | 1924 | NS&T | DEDT | coach | GUELPH | to NS&T 83 in 1927 |
| 108 | 1926 | NS&T | DEDT | combine | GUELPH | to M&SC 300 in 1927; rebuilt to snow plow |
| 150-153 | | | DT | open-platform trailer | GUELPH | ex-New York City, 1918; rebuilt with closed platforms |
| 201 | | TRCo? | DEDT | express motor | GUELPH | |
| 250 | | | DEDT | express motor | GUELPH | to Montreal & Southern Counties Railway 305, 1927 |
| 251 | | | | flat trailer | GUELPH | |
| 252 | | | DT | line car/plow | GUELPH | to NS&T in 1927; scrapped 1947 |
| 300 | 1926 | NS&T | DEDT | 60-ton box cab locomotive | GUELPH | to Waterloo, Cedar Falls & Northern 7 in 1927 |
Canadian Nitro Products
| "1000" | c.1916 | | DEDT | flat motor | | rebuilt from Toronto and York Radial Railway flat trailer; originally James Bay Railway flat trailer; to Stanstead Granite Quarries Ltd. (Beebe, PQ) in 1920; scrapped 1940 |

Builder

Trucks

| NS&T | Niagara, St. Catharines & Toronto |
| Preston | Preston Car Company |
| TRCo | Toronto Railway Company |

| DE | double-ended |
| DT | double trucked |
| SE | single-ended |
| ST | single truck |

== Other Toronto lines controlled by Sir William Mackenzie ==
- Niagara, St. Catharines and Toronto Railway
- Toronto and York Radial Railway
- Toronto Railway Company

== See also ==
- Rail trail
- Wilbur Lake
- List of Ontario railways
- List of defunct Canadian railways
