= Drummond County Railway =

Defunct 19th-century railway company in Quebec, Canada

- chemin de fer du comté de Drummond

Overview
- Dates of operation: 1886–1899
- Successor: Intercolonial Railway; Canadian National Railways

Technical
- Track gauge: 1,435 mm (4 ft 8 1/2 in)

The Drummond County Railway (DCR), or chemin de fer du comté de Drummond, was a Canadian railway active from 1886 to 1899 based in Drummondville, Quebec, Canada.

== History ==
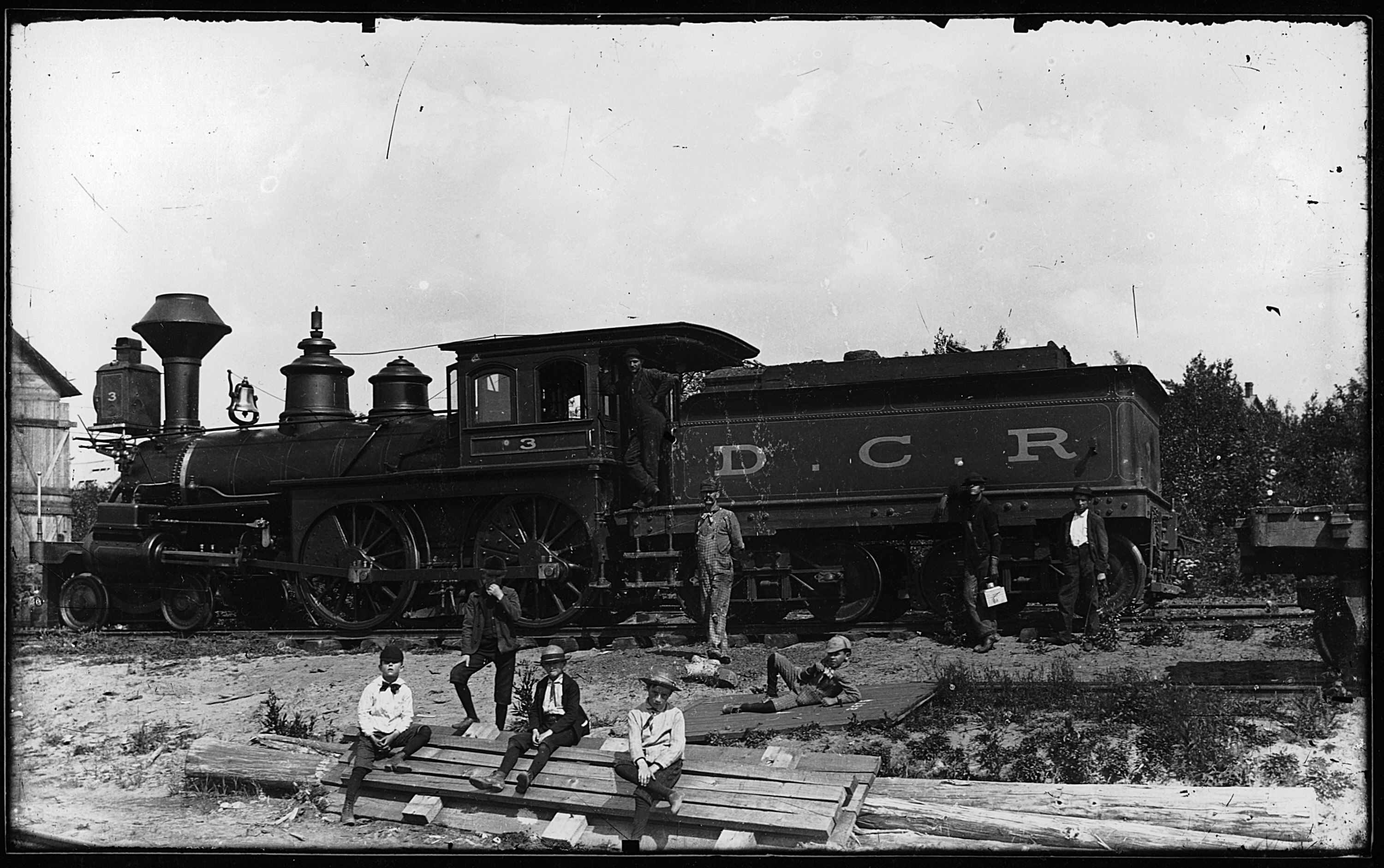
Drummond County Railway engine No. 3, Drummondville, Quebec, Canada, about 1895

It was originally a local line for the timber industry. At its maximum expansion, it stretched from Lévis to Saint-Hyacinthe, Quebec. It connected with the Grand Trunk Railway at Saint-Hyacinthe. The DCR was purchased by the Canadian government in 1899 and integrated into the Intercolonial Railway's network. An earlier attempt to lease the company to the government was criticized as paying too much for the company to benefit financial backers of the party in power.

The line's Drummondville station in Drummondville, built in 1904 after the federal government acquired the line, is listed in the Quebec government's Répertoire du patrimoine culturel du Québec.

Currently, the main line is still in operation. It is part of the Canadian National network and is also used by the trains of VIA Rail.

== See also ==
- Railways in Canada
