= Grand Trunk Railway Literary and Scientific Society =

Former institute and library

The Grand Trunk Railway Literary and Scientific Institute was a mechanics' institute and library established by officers and employees of the Grand Trunk Railway (GTR) in 1857 in the Point St. Charles neighbourhood of Montreal in the Province of Canada. Incorporated in 1871, the institute remained active until 1923, when GTR was purchased by Canadian National Railways. The institute is listed as a component of the Canadian National Railway.

The institute, like other mechanics' institutes of its time, aimed to provide its members with education in science, literature, and the arts. It also offered a reading room, library, and various specimens and drawings. While some mechanics' institutes functioned as cultural centres for their communities, the Grand Trunk Railway Literary and Scientific Institute focused more on educating its workers.

At its location in Point St. Charles, the institute housed over 6,500 volumes. Membership provided access to various amenities, including hot and cold baths, the use of the lecture hall for lunch at noon, and various lectures and entertainments. The lecture hall, a large room equipped with tables and benches, also featured a heating chamber to keep men's lunches hot. Additionally, the hall had a stage with stock scenery for dramatic productions.

== Membership ==
Any employee could become a member of the institute to make use of the library and reading room, providing the potential member had two recommendations from existing members and paid the monthly membership dues.

=== Life members ===
Life membership was given to anyone who donated $25, rendered valuable service to the institute, retained membership for at least 25 years, or was a person eminent in arts or sciences.

By 1905, Life Members included:

- Sir Charles Rivers Wilson
- Charles Melville Hays
- Alfred Waldron Smithers
- Frank W. Morse
- Wm. McWood, Esq.
- George Allan
- S. Walker
- L. J. Seargeant
- F. L. Wanklyn
- Henry Oppenheim
- Robert Surgeon
- J. Millington
- Sir Henry W. Tyler
- James Black
- H.A. White
- Herbert Wallis
- J. Alex Hutchison
- John Taylor
- Alfred Walton
- F. R. Clark
- Wm. Cross
- David Thomas
- Andrew Patterson
- J. Gollan
- F.P. Currie
- Robert Cowans
- Sir Joseph Hickson

== Governance ==
=== Officers ===
The institute was governed by the officers of the institute: president, vice presidents, secretary-treasurer, a managing committee of thirteen members, a board of trustees, a librarian and two auditors. The president was to preside over all meetings and see that the institute's constitution and by-laws were observed. The vice presidents were to assist the president and act in his absence. The secretary-treasure was to keep the books, attend all general and committee meetings, keep the minutes of the meetings, conduct all correspondence, receive all moneys due, and make the books available to the auditors twice a year. The trustees consisted of the president of the Grand Trunk Railway, the board of directors, the mechanical superintendent, and two members elected as working trustees.

=== Librarian ===
The librarian was to open the library and reading room for the hours set by the committee. He had to take care of all the books, periodicals, papers and property of the institute. He had to keep a register of the members. He had to keep a record of all books taken out of the library by members. He was to not permit anyone but committee members from having access to the book cases. If a book needed repairs, the librarian was to report the offending members to the committee and submit the books for the committee's inspection. He was required to be courteous to visitors.

=== Managing Committee ===
Among the powers of the Managing Committee were: deciding the charges for lectures and classes, purchasing, exchanging, and accepting gifts or loans of books, and establishing regulations of use of the reading room, library, lectures and classes. The committee also had the power to draft by-laws of the institute, but all acts of the committee were to be approved by members at a general meeting. The committee also had governance over membership with the ability to reprimand, fine, suspend or expel a member for acting contrary to the rules of the institute.

=== By-laws ===
The by-laws included setting a date for the annual general meeting, the frequency of the committee's meetings, and the hours of operation of the reading room. The by-laws stated that "silence and decorum must be observed at all times in the Reading Room." The by-laws required the catalogue to be kept in the reading room for all members' convenience. Papers and periodicals were not allowed to leave the room. Members were allowed to borrow books for 14 days; late fines were one cent per day. Members no longer employed by GTR had their membership service unless they qualified to be a life member.

== Lectures and programming ==
One topic included for lecture in 1915 was "Banks: Ancient & Modern," given by C. E. Benedict of the Bank of Montreal.

== Gifts to the institute ==
In 1861, when the Prince Edward, Prince of Wales, visited the new railway bridge in Montreal, Victoria Bridge, he presented the Point St. Charles location of the institute a gift of $440 for the benefit of the employees. The directors of the Grand Trunk Railway handed over the sum to the committee of the institute for the purchase of new books.

On March 27, 1879, the Point St. Charles branch of the institute received a gift from J. Curtis Clark, in the form of five framed pictures of Queen Victoria, the Governor General John Campbell, Marquess of Lorne, the Princess Louise, Marchioness of Lorne, the late Governor General the Frederick Hamilton-Temple-Blackwood, Earl of Dufferin, and Hariot, Countess of Dufferin.

== Other locations ==
The institute was also located in GTR stations in the Ontario towns of Belleville, Stratford, and Lindsay.

The institute in Lindsay operated from 1890 to 1923 with a reading room and library on the second floor of the station at Durham and William Streets. The library contained 1600 volumes of books. Hours of operation were 2 to 5 pm and 7 to 9 pm six days a week. The librarian, David Callison Trew (1844–1925), was paid $8 per month. The fee for membership was 5¢ per month. In 1914, a spark from a passing engine set the station's roof on fire. The extent of the damage was to the roof and attic of the building. The greatest loss for the library was to the periodicals on the tables. "The cases saved the books."
