= Canadian National Electric Railways =

Overview
- Headquarters: Toronto, Ontario
- Reporting mark: CNER
- Locale: Ontario and Quebec
- Dates of operation: 1923–

Technical
- Track gauge: 1,435 mm (4 ft 8 1/2 in) standard gauge

The Canadian National Electric Railways (CNER) was a subsidiary of the Canadian National Railways created to operate a few electric lines. It was formed in November 1923, with headquarters in Toronto.

== Acquired lines ==
The CNER inherited the following lines or systems from the Canadian Northern Railway and unified them under one management:

- Niagara, St. Catharines and Toronto Railway - an interurban system operating on the Niagara Peninsula
- Toronto Suburban Railway - Guelph and Woodbridge lines only
- Toronto Eastern Railway - a line never completed

== Associated lines ==
The CNER was closely associated with three railways which Canadian National Railways inherited from the Grand Trunk Railway. These railways never became a corporate part of the CNER:

- Oshawa Railway - a passenger and freight operation in Oshawa, Ontario
- Thousand Islands Railway - a shortline in Gananoque, Ontario - never electrified
- Montreal and Southern Counties Railway - an interurban between Montreal and Granby, Quebec with a branch to Longueuil

== Radial network ==
With the creation of the CNER, CNR president Henry Thornton was enthusiastic to develop Canadian National's own network of electric railways. This followed setbacks that Adam Beck had in promoting an Ontario Hydro radial network with its subsidiary the Hydro-Electric Railways.

Thornton planned to link the unfinished Toronto Eastern Railway to the Toronto Suburban Railway's Guelph line via the Toronto Belt Line Railway running through northern Toronto. There was also another plan to extend the Guelph line from its "temporary" terminal at Keele Street and St. Clair Avenue to downtown via the nearby CNR line. The CNER's Toronto Suburban district never turned a profit, and its abandonment in 1931 was the result of huge deficits from that line.

== See also ==
- Hydro-Electric Railways was another organization intended to promote radials in Ontario.
- Interurban
- List of defunct Canadian railways
