= Chicago and Lake Huron Railroad =

Overview
- Dates of operation: 1873–1880
- Predecessors: Peninsular Railway; Port Huron and Lake Michigan Railroad
- Successor: Chicago and Grand Trunk Railway

Technical
- Track gauge: 1,435 mm (4 ft 8 1/2 in)
- Length: 232 miles (373 km)

The Chicago and Lake Huron Railroad was a railway company in the United States. It was formed in 1873 from the consolidation of the Peninsular Railway and Port Huron and Lake Michigan Railroad. The company owned two disconnected lines: one between Port Huron, Michigan, and Flint, Michigan, and the other between Lansing, Michigan, and Valparaiso, Indiana. The completion of the Chicago and North Eastern Railroad in 1877 unified the two segments. The company went bankrupt in 1879; the interests behind the Grand Trunk Railway acquired the assets and created the Chicago and Grand Trunk Railway in 1880. The line, still extant, became part of the Grand Trunk Western Railroad's main line between Port Huron and Chicago.

== History ==
The Chicago and Lake Huron Railroad was composed of two disconnected railway lines. The Port Huron and Lake Michigan Railroad had completed a line between Port Huron, Michigan, and Flint, Michigan, in 1871. The Peninsular Railway completed a line between Lansing, Michigan, and Battle Creek, Michigan, in 1870. The company extended its line southwest to South Bend, Indiana, in 1871, and at the time of consolidation the western terminus stood at Kingsbury, Indiana, 20 miles (32 km) from Valparaiso, Indiana.

The consolidation was formalized on August 15, 1873. The extension to Valparaiso was completed on October 7, 1873. In Valparaiso a connection was made with the Pittsburgh, Fort Wayne and Chicago Railway, permitting through operation between Lansing and Chicago.

The railroad entered receivership in 1874, with the gap between Lansing and Flint unclosed. This finally changed with the founding of the Chicago and North Eastern Railroad, under the leadership of James Munroe Turner. The Chicago and North Eastern was incorporated on August 12, 1874, with at least the informal backing of the Grand Trunk Railway. That railroad opened for operation on January 15, 1877, creating a new route between Port Huron and Chicago. The Chicago and North Eastern coordinated its operations with the Chicago and Lake Huron and remained fiscally independent.

In 1878–1879 the Chicago and Lake Huron Railroad was caught up in a struggle between the New York Central and Hudson River Railroad, led by William Henry Vanderbilt, and the Grand Trunk, led by Sir Henry Tyler. Vanderbilt briefly gained control of the Chicago and Lake Huron Railroad, disrupting the Grand Trunk's access to Chicago. The Chicago and Lake Huron, still in receivership, was sold in a foreclosure sale in 1879. The company's assets were split between three companies: the Michigan Railway, North Western Grand Trunk Railway, and Indiana Railway. All three were Grand Trunk-affiliated, and in 1880 were consolidated with the Chicago and North Eastern to create the Chicago and Grand Trunk Railway.
