= Port Huron and Lake Michigan Railroad =

Overview
- Dates of operation: 1847–1873
- Successor: Chicago and Lake Huron Railroad

Technical
- Track gauge: 1,435 mm (4 ft 8 1/2 in)
- Length: 66 miles (106 km)

The Port Huron and Lake Michigan Railroad was a railway company in the United States. It was chartered in 1847, and after decades of inactivity, completed a line between Port Huron, Michigan, and Flint, Michigan, in 1871. It was consolidated with the Peninsular Railway in 1873 to form the Chicago and Lake Huron Railroad. Its line, still extant, became part of the Grand Trunk Western Railroad's main line between Port Huron and Chicago.

== History ==
The state of Michigan authorized land grants for various railroad projects, including a "northern" route between Port Huron and Grand Haven or Ludington via Flint. Two railroads were established to take advantage of this offer. The first of these was the Port Huron and Lake Michigan Railroad, which was chartered on January 30, 1847. The second, the Port Huron and Milwaukee Railway, was chartered on February 12, 1855.

Both projects remained dormant for decades. The Port Huron and Milwaukee completed some work and received some land grants, but never operated and was acquired by the Port Huron and Lake Michigan on June 26, 1862. The Port Huron and Lake Michigan completed a line between Port Huron and "Emmet" (near Capac) in November 1869, and to Flint on December 12, 1871. In Flint, the line terminated at Saginaw Street, west of the present location of the University of Michigan–Flint and just short of the Flint and Pere Marquette Railroad.

Between 1871 and 1873 the company considered various expansion plans. These included building southwest to Lansing to connect with the Peninsular Railway, west to Owosso to connect with the projected Owosso and North Western Railroad (a forerunner of the Ann Arbor Railroad), or building a connection at an unnamed location with the eastern end of Michigan Air Line Railroad. (Note: In 1872, the Michigan Air Line Railroad leased its line between Romeo and Richmond (then called Ridgeway) to the St. Clair River, Pontiac and Jackson Railroad. The Michigan Air Line Railway acquired that company in 1875.) The Port Huron and Lake Michigan Railroad and Peninsular Railway consolidated on August 15, 1873, to form the Chicago and Lake Huron Railroad.
