= Intercolonial Railway =

Historic Canadian railway linking Central Canada to Maritime provinces

Intercolonial Railway of Canada

Overview
- Headquarters: Moncton, New Brunswick
- Reporting mark: ICR, IRC
- Locale: Nova Scotia, New Brunswick, Quebec
- Dates of operation: 1872–1918

Technical
- Track gauge: 4 ft 8 1/2 in (1,435 mm) standard gauge
- Previous gauge: sections built to 5 ft 6 in (1,676 mm) but converted in 1875 prior to opening

The Intercolonial Railway of Canada (reporting mark IRC), also referred to as the Intercolonial Railway (ICR), was a historic Canadian railway that operated from 1872 to 1918, when it became part of Canadian National Railways. As the railway was also completely owned and controlled by the Government of Canada, the Intercolonial was also one of Canada's first Crown corporations.

== Origins ==
The idea of a railway connecting Britain's North American colonies arose as soon as the railway age began in the 1830s. In the decades following the War of 1812 and ever-mindful of the issue of security, the colonies of Upper and Lower Canada (later the Province of Canada after 1840) wished to improve land-based transportation with the Atlantic coast colonies of Nova Scotia and New Brunswick, and to a lesser extent Prince Edward Island and Newfoundland. A railway connection from the Province of Canada to the British colonies on the coast would serve a vital military purpose during the winter months when the waters of the Gulf of St. Lawrence and St. Lawrence River were frozen and shipping was impossible, but it would similarly serve an economic purpose for the Maritimes by opening up year-round access to new markets.

Significant surveys were conducted throughout the 1830s–1850s. Several rival routes emerged: a southern, a central, and a northern route. In 1849, Major William Robinson recommended the northern route as most secure from American attack. Funding talks were established between the various colonial administrations and the British government, but progress remained slow and little was accomplished beyond talk.

== Pre-Confederation components ==
Railway construction came to the Maritime provinces as early as the mid-1830s with the opening of the Albion Railway, a coal mining railway in Nova Scotia's Pictou County and the second railway to open in British North America. Construction in the 1850s saw two important rail lines opened in the Maritimes to connect cities on the Atlantic coast with steamship routes in the Northumberland Strait and the Gulf of St. Lawrence:

- The Nova Scotia Railway (NSR) was built in stages between the Atlantic port of Halifax north to Truro, and northeast to industrial Pictou County, those being the towns of Westville, Stellarton, New Glasgow, Trenton, and the Northumberland Strait port town of Pictou. Pictou soon became an important ferry port for steamships servicing Prince Edward Island. The NSR also built northwest from Halifax to the town of Windsor, a port on the Bay of Fundy and gateway to the agricultural hinterland of Nova Scotia's Annapolis Valley.
- The European and North American Railway (E&NA) was a line that was envisioned to extend the New England rail network eastward through the Maritimes to an ice free harbour closer to the shipping routes to Europe. The first portion of the E&NA built was between the Bay of Fundy port city of Saint John, via "The Bend" (of the Petitcodiac River, this area is today known as the city of Moncton) to the Northumberland Strait port town of Shediac. The Saint John–Shediac line opened on August 20, 1857, and eventually other companies built separate sections of railway linking Saint John west through Maine to the New England network, however the E&NA remained solely a Saint John–Shediac connection, with a number of minor feeder lines, and never reached a port in Nova Scotia.

An intercolonial rail system in the British North American colonies was never far from the minds of government and civic leaders, and in an 1851 speech at a Masonic hall in Halifax, Joseph Howe, editor of the Novascotian, said:

I am neither a prophet, nor the son of a prophet, yet I will venture to predict that in five years we shall make the journey hence to Quebec and Montreal, and home through Portland and St. John, by rail; and I believe that many in this room will live to hear the whistle of the steam engine in the passes of the Rocky Mountains, and to make the journey from Halifax to the Pacific in five or six days.

But a rail connection between the Maritime colonies and the Province of Canada was not to be for another quarter century. Central Canada's dominant railway player in the 1850s was the Grand Trunk Railway (GTR), and its profit-driven business model chose the U.S. Atlantic port of Portland, Maine, over a much longer journey to a Maritime port. As a result, Portland boomed during the winter months when Montreal's shipping season was closed.

== Confederation ==
Nevertheless, the geopolitical instability in North America resulting from the American Civil War led to increased nervousness on the part of British North American colonies, particularly wary of the large Union Army operating south of their borders. The demands for closer political and economic ties between colonies led to further calls for an "Intercolonial Railway". An 1862 conference in Quebec City led to an agreement on financing the railway with the Maritime colonies and Canada splitting construction costs and Britain assuming any debts, but the deal fell through within months.

It is speculated that this failure to achieve a deal on the Intercolonial in 1862, combined with the ongoing concerns over the American Civil War, led to the Charlottetown Conference in 1864, and eventually to Confederation of New Brunswick, Nova Scotia, and the Province of Canada (Ontario and Quebec) in 1867.

Section 145 of the British North America Act, 1867 created a constitutional requirement for the federal government to build established the Intercolonial Railway:

145. Inasmuch as the Provinces of Canada, Nova Scotia, and New Brunswick have joined in a Declaration that the Construction of the Intercolonial Railway is essential to the Consolidation of the Union of British North America, and to the Assent thereto of Nova Scotia and New Brunswick, and have consequently agreed that Provision should be made for its immediate Construction by the Government of Canada; Therefore, in order to give effect to that Agreement, it shall be the Duty of the Government and Parliament of Canada to provide for the commencement, within Six Months after the Union, of a Railway connecting the River St. Lawrence with the City of Halifax in Nova Scotia, and for the Construction thereof without Intermission, and the Completion thereof with all practicable Speed.

Despite being enshrined in the British North America Act 1867, it would still be another decade before a route was finally selected and construction was completed; however, as a start, the federal government assumed the operations of the NSR and E&NA which were to be wholly absorbed into the ICR. The route connecting the NSR and the E&NA was not contestable as the line had to cross the Cobequid Mountains and the Isthmus of Chignecto where options were limited by the local topography. In New Brunswick, it was a different story, as the choice was narrowed to three options. A commission of engineers, headed by Sandford Fleming had been unanimously appointed in 1863 to consider the following:

- The "Frontier Route"—surveyed in 1836 by Captain Yule (Royal Engineers) from Saint John, via Fredericton, up the Saint John River valley to Canada East, not far from the International Boundary which had been recently decided in favour of the United States during the Webster–Ashburton Treaty of 1842.
- The "Central Route"—surveyor unknown, running north from a point near Sussex, passing near Grand Lake, and north to Canada East.
- The "Chaleur Bay Route"—surveyed in the 1840s by Major Robinson (Royal Engineers), running from "The Bend" (Moncton), north to Newcastle on the Miramichi River, Bathurst and Campbellton, to Canada East. It would cross the Gaspé Peninsula using the Matapédia River valley Kempt Road before heading up the St. Lawrence River valley to the rail connection with the GTR at Rivière-du-Loup.

Despite pressure from commercial interests in the Maritimes and New England who wanted a rail connection closer to the border, the Chaleur Bay routing was chosen, amid the backdrop of the American Civil War, as it would keep the Intercolonial far from the boundary with Maine.

== Construction ==
Fleming was appointed "engineer in chief" of the ICR project by the federal government. The majority of the construction was to be tendered to local contractors, with engineering oversight to be provided by Fleming's staff, however political interference and contractor negligence (or incompetence) led to escalating costs on some of the contracts, forcing Fleming to assume some of the direct contractor duties as violators were discovered and purged from the project.

Perhaps the greatest case of cost overruns was caused by political interference during construction of the section of new line between the NSR trackage at Truro and the E&NA trackage near Moncton. This resulted in several diversions from the most direct route:

- From Debert to the Wentworth Valley running a circuitous route known as "The Grecian Bend" through the iron mining community of Londonderry on the southern slope of the Cobequid Mountains. An iron trestle was required to cross the Folly River and to this day the diversion adds 4 miles (6.4 km) to the mainline.
- From Oxford to Amherst, running near the coal mining community of Springhill, along the northern slope of the Cobequid Mountains.
- The section running from the interprovincial boundary at the Missaguash River near the town of Amherst to Moncton was diverted further west to run into the Memramcook River valley to service the village of Dorchester at the insistence of an influential politician, A. J. Smith. The alignment is known as the "Dorchester Diversion".

To Fleming's credit, he insisted upon a high quality of workmanship in designing the route, using fills several metres higher than the surrounding landscape, where possible, to prevent snow accumulation, and mandated the installation of iron bridges over streams and rivers rather than the cheaper wooden structures that many railways of the time favoured. This latter decision proved extremely far-sighted as the strength of the bridges and their material saved the line from lengthy closures on numerous occasions in the early years during forest fire seasons. The scale of construction on the Intercolonial made it the biggest Canadian public works project of the 19th century.

Sections of the railway opened as follows:

- Truro to Moncton in November 1872. A major obstacle involved crossing the Cobequid Mountains with the Intercolonial's route running through the "Folly Gap", also known as the Wentworth Valley.
- Rivière-du-Loup to S^{te}-Flavie (now Mont-Joli) in August 1874. This portion of the route is entirely in the lower St. Lawrence River valley.
- Moncton to Campbellton in 1875. A major obstacle involved bridging the northwest and southwest branches of the Miramichi River near their confluence at Newcastle.
- Campbellton to S^{te}-Flavie on July 1, 1876. The main obstacle involved running the line through the Matapedia River valley where deep cuts would prove to be a problem for years during the winter months. Problems with clearing snow in some of these areas were resolved with the construction of extensive snow sheds—the only ones in eastern Canada.

The ICR was initially built to broad gauge of 5 feet 6 inches (1,680 mm) to be compatible with other railways in British North America, namely its component systems, the NSR and the E&NA, as well as its western connection at Rivière-du-Loup, the GTR. Before the construction was even complete, Fleming had the ICR re-gauged to standard gauge in 1875, following the trend of standardization sweeping U.S. and Canadian railways at the time.

== Operation and expansion ==
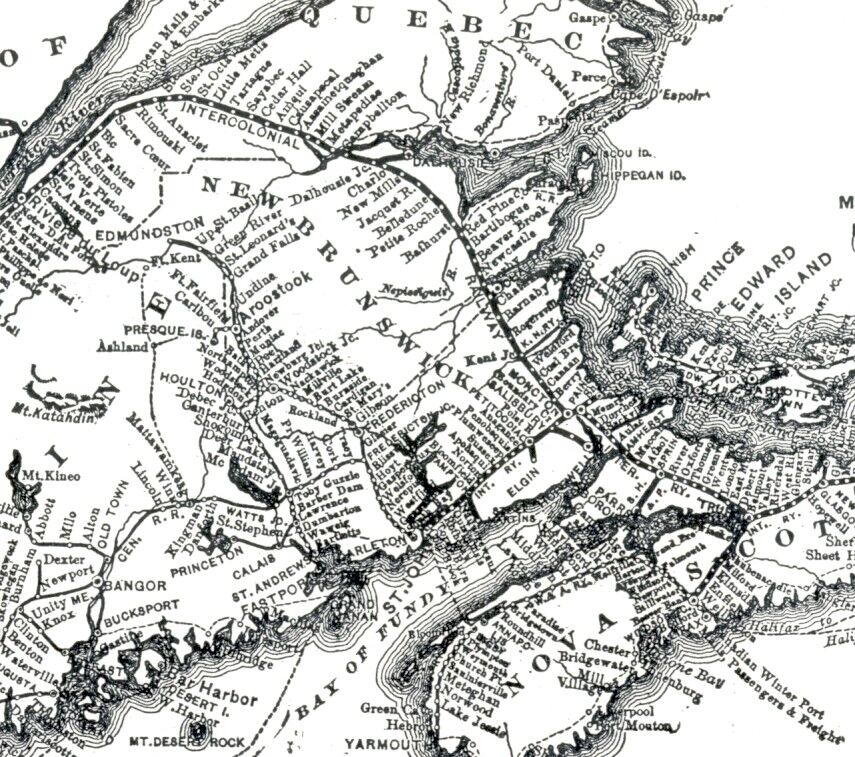
Intercolonial system map in 1877

In 1879, the ICR purchased the GTR line between Rivière-du-Loup and Levis, opposite from Quebec City. This line had been completed in 1860 by the GTR, and the ICR had had running rights on it since 1876.

The main line of the ICR competed directly with the steamship service of the Quebec & Gulf Ports Steamship Company, which was reorganized in 1880 as the Quebec Steamship Company. By the late 1880s, this concern operated only one steamer, the Miramichi, between Quebec and Pictou; all of its other vessels had been shifted to service between New York and the West Indies.

In 1884, the ICR built a branch from its mainline east of Campbellton to service the port and forest industry town of Dalhousie.

At Rivière du Loup, in the 1880s the ICR made connections with the steamers of the St. Lawrence Steam Navigation Company. This steamship line was absorbed by the Richelieu & Ontario Navigation Company in 1886.

In the late 1880s, the ICR received running rights over the GTR main line between Levis and Montreal (via Richmond), allowing passengers and cargo from the Maritimes to Canada's then-largest city to transit without interchanging.

In 1887 the ICR took over and completed construction of a line running from Oxford Junction to Stellarton, along Nova Scotia shores of the Northumberland Strait. This line was known as the "Short Line" and it provided an alternate route for ICR trains heading to Pictou County and Cape Breton Island from New Brunswick.

The Temiscouata Railway was completed in 1889 from Rivière du Loup to Edmundston, New Brunswick, giving the ICR a connection with the Canadian Pacific line up the St. John Valley.

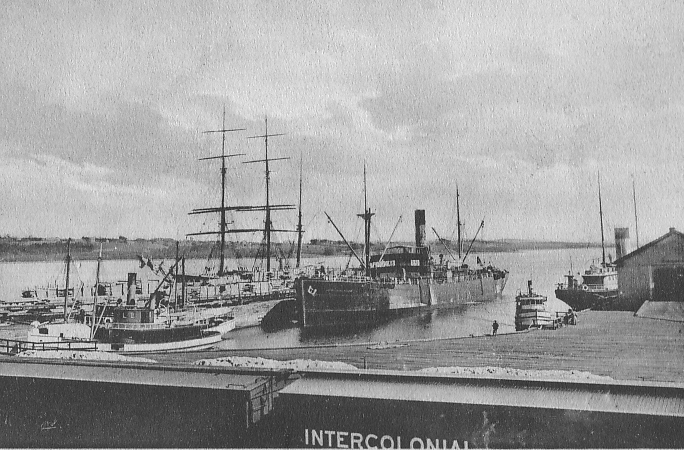
ICR cars dockside at Pictou, Nova Scotia, c. 1912.

In 1890, the ICR completed construction of what had begun as the Cape Breton Eastern Extension Railway, with a line running from its former NSR terminus at New Glasgow eastward through Antigonish to the port of Mulgrave where a railcar ferry service was instituted over a 1.6-kilometre (1 mi) route across the deep waters of the Strait of Canso to Point Tupper. The line then headed east across the centre of Cape Breton Island, crossing the Bras d'Or Lake on the newly built Grand Narrows Bridge, continuing to the port of North Sydney (with ferry and steamship connections to Port aux Basques, Newfoundland) and terminating in the burgeoning industrial centre and port of Sydney.

In 1899, the Department of Railways and Canals purchased the Drummond County Railway from James Naismith Greenshields and folded it into the ICR to provide the railway with a direct route from Sainte-Rosalie (east of Saint-Hyacinthe where it met the GTR main line) to Lévis. After this purchase was complete, the ICR stopped using the GTR's route via Richmond.

The ICR opened a branch of 10.06 kilometres (6.25 mi) on June 22, 1903, between Rivière Ouelle Station and Pointe St. Denis on the South Shore of the St. Lawrence. In 1904 the ferry Champlain entered service between Pointe St. Denis and the North Shore ports of St. Irenée, Murray Bay and Cap à l'Aigle.

Also in 1904, the ICR purchased the Canada Eastern Railway, giving it a connection to the Fredericton area.

Moncton became the headquarters for the company and extensive shops and yard facilities were built, as well as a grand station, built to rival the Canadian Pacific Railway station in McAdam. Following a February 24, 1906 fire, the Moncton shops were rebuilt at a new location at the insistence of the local Member of Parliament, Henry Emmerson, who was the Minister of Railways and Canals in Prime Minister Wilfrid Laurier's cabinet. The replacement shops were built northwest of downtown while the former shops location was converted into yard facilities. Both Rivière-du-Loup and Campbellton had unsuccessfully lobbied to become the new headquarters of the ICR following the Moncton fire.

As a result of the ICR with its subsidized freight-rate agreements, as well as the National Policy of prime minister John A. Macdonald, the industrial revolution struck Maritime towns quickly. The ICR was the perfect vehicle for transporting raw ore such as iron ore and coal to steel plants in Trenton, Sydney Mines and Sydney, as well as finished and semi-finished products to other Maritime and central Canadian locations. This led to foundries and factories of various industries springing up throughout Nova Scotia and New Brunswick along the ICR main line and branch lines.

== Passenger trains ==
Passenger trains on the ICR operated between all points on the system which included the following major sections:

- Halifax–Truro
- Truro – Pictou County – Sydney
- Truro–Moncton
- Saint John – Moncton
- Moncton–Newcastle–Bathurst–Campbellton–Rivière-du-Loup–Lévis–Montreal

Several "name trains" were started by the ICR, including the Maritime Express and the longest-enduring "name" passenger train in Canada to this very day, the Ocean Limited.

ICR passenger trains also connected with steamship services to Prince Edward Island at Shediac and Pictou, steamship services to Quebec at Pictou, steamship services to the United States and Europe at Halifax and Saint John, provided railcar ferries to Cape Breton Island, and steamship services operated by the Newfoundland Railway to Newfoundland at North Sydney.

== First World War ==
As a government-owned railway and the only operator of a rail connection to the port of Halifax and the extensive defence establishment there, the ICR became a lifeline for the Canadian and British war effort throughout the First World War, particularly since as the CPR line to Saint John ran through the state of Maine on its eastward route from Montreal, thereby any war shipments on CPR would violate the United States' neutrality.

Halifax grew in importance, particularly as Germany introduced use of submarines for the first time to a large-scale conflict, requiring the Royal Canadian Navy and the Royal Navy to institute the use of convoys for protecting ships. Halifax's protected harbour allowed ships to load and form up into convoy formations under protection due to torpedo nets strung across the harbour entrance. The ICR swelled in its ranks of employees and equipment as it struggled to carry the burden of military supplies from central Canada to the Atlantic coast. After 1915, the busy wartime railway officially operated under the name Canadian Government Railways but continued to be widely known as the Intercolonial. An equally important connection was the line from Cape Breton where the largest private employer in Canada, the Dominion Steel and Coal Company (through its predecessors) produced vast quantities of steel and coal for the war effort, much of which was carried by the ICR westward to other industrial centres, before returning via Halifax for shipment overseas.

The tragedy of the Halifax Explosion on December 6, 1917, played havoc with much of the ICR's infrastructure in the Richmond neighbourhood of north-end Halifax. The ICR's North Street station was heavily damaged and its Richmond Yard and shipping terminals were destroyed or rendered unusable. Hundreds of freight cars were destroyed and dozens of passenger and military hospital cars were heavily damaged. Many ICR employees, most notably train dispatcher Vincent Coleman, responded with heroism and desperate determination to evacuate wounded and summon relief. The explosion severely but only briefly hampered war-time operations at the port. The railway mobilized repair crews from across Eastern Canada to clear debris with remarkable speed and resumed its full schedule five days after the explosion, albeit with diminished passengers cars as many were severely damaged. Wharves and freight facilities were rebuilt for wartime service within a month. Construction that had begun on a second route using a vast rock cut through the south end of the Halifax peninsula to a new "Ocean Terminal" was accelerated. The ICR repaired the North Street Station to serve for another year but switched passenger service to a new south end station near the present day Halifax railway station in January 1919.

== Herald and reporting marks ==
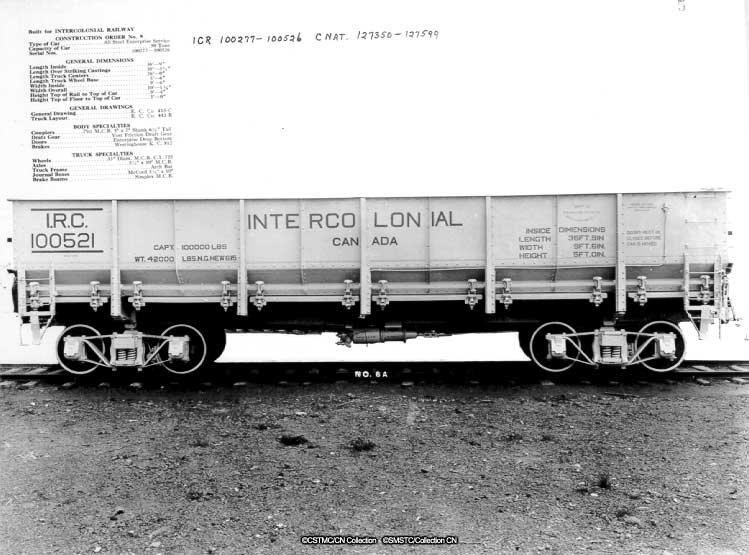
Steel Intercolonial self-dumping car in Nova Scotia, circa 1916.

For most of its history the Intercolonial reporting mark was ICR, but was changed to IRC during the First World War. Intercolonial publications, newspaper reports and popular usage used ICR. The railway's logo was a large bull moose herald, part of a campaign to promote hunting and fishing tourism traffic. It appeared on many promotional publications but seldom appeared on rolling stock.

== Legacy ==
The ICR was Canada's first national railway (although some might argue the case for the GTR), having pre-dated the CPR by nine years, and it was also the first significant Crown corporation. The ICR was a pervasive and ubiquitous presence in the Maritimes, with the company employing thousands of workers, purchasing millions of dollars in services, coal, and other local products annually, operating ferries to Cape Breton Island at the Strait of Canso, and carrying the Royal Mail. The IRC was the face of the federal government in many communities in a region that was still somewhat hostile to what many believed was a forced Confederation (anti-Confederation organizers remained active in Nova Scotia and particularly New Brunswick into the 1880s).

In 1915 the ICR, together with the federally-owned National Transcontinental Railway (NTR) and the Prince Edward Island Railway (PEIR), as well as several bankrupt or defunct shortlines in New Brunswick, were grouped under the collective banner of the Canadian Government Railways (CGR) for funding and administrative purposes, although each company continued to operate independently.

On September 6, 1918, the bankrupt Canadian Northern Railway (CNoR) was nationalized by the Borden government, as part of a three-year long programme of re-organization of Canadian railways by Minister of Railways and Canals John Dowsley Reid. The CNoR's government-appointed Board of Management was directed to assume control of the CGR system at this time. On December 20, 1918, Reid consolidated the management of the various companies by creating the Canadian National Railways (CNR), by means of an order issued by the Privy Council. Another bankrupt western railway system, the Grand Trunk Pacific Railway (GTPR), was nationalized by the federal government on March 7, 1919, and became part of the CNR system on July 12, 1920. GTPR's parent company, the GTR was also nationalized on May 21, 1920, before being included in the CNR system on January 30, 1923.

The ICR had been called the "People's Railway" and this slogan was similarly applied to the CNR for a period.

Despite many claims of political interference in its construction and subsequent operation, the majority of IRC from an operations viewpoint remained economically self-sufficient. This was largely because ICR balance books never had to contend with falling freight and passenger revenues as a result of post-Second World War highway construction and airline usage. During the 42-year life of the ICR from 1876 to 1918, the railway had grown to a monopoly position in land transportation.

Following its demise in 1918, the ICR trackage and facilities formed the majority of CNR's Maritimes operations and CN (acronym abbreviated post-1960) maintained Moncton as its principal regional headquarters well into the 1980s. Until the late-1970s, the ICR line through northern New Brunswick and eastern Quebec continued to host a large portion of CN's freight and the majority of its passenger traffic to Nova Scotia, Prince Edward Island, and Newfoundland.

In 1976, a 48-kilometre (30 mi) "cutoff" was built from Pelletier, Quebec, to a point on the former ICR main line west of Rivière-du-Loup, eliminating 320 kilometres (200 mi) of mountainous trackage on the former NTR to Quebec City. Following this development, the majority of freight traffic to the Maritimes shifted to the NTR's line through central New Brunswick, relegating the ICR line east of Rivière-du-Loup to secondary main line status.

Following CN's privatization in 1995, the company undertook a network rationalization program which made the IRC line between Moncton and Rivière-du-Loup, along with its trackage on the Gaspé Peninsula, redundant and it was sold in 1998 to short line operator Quebec Railway Corporation which operated for a time the New Brunswick East Coast Railway and associated subsidiaries. The ICR line from Truro to Sydney was sold to a short line operator, the Cape Breton and Central Nova Scotia Railway, in 1993.

The former ICR main line from Sainte-Rosalie to Charny and the east end of Lévis to Rivière-du-Loup, as well as the ICR lines from Moncton to Saint John and Moncton to Halifax remain in operation under CN. A short section on the waterfront of Lévis was abandoned on October 24, 1998, due to network rationalization, resulting in the CN main line between Charny and the east end of Levis running on former NTR trackage.

Despite the replacement or upgrading of bridges and track since the 19th century, almost the entirety of Fleming's route continues to operate; its fills and rock cuts and iron bridges, once considered extravagant, remain much as they were when they were built.

Via Rail continues to operate the Ocean passenger train between Halifax and Montreal following the entire route of the ICR the entire way except for the waterfront section in Levis.

Former ICR stations in Lévis and Pictou have been designated as National Historic Sites of Canada, as well as the Joffre Roundhouse constructed by the ICR in Charny. The establishment of the ICR has been designated a National Historic Event.

== See also ==
- History of rail transport in Canada
- List of defunct Canadian railways
