= Peninsular Railway (Illinois–Indiana–Michigan) =

Overview
- Dates of operation: 1865–1873
- Successor: Chicago and Lake Huron Railroad

Technical
- Track gauge: 1,435 mm (4 ft 8 1/2 in)
- Length: 144 miles (232 km)

The Peninsular Railway was a railway company in the United States. It was incorporated in 1865, and constructed a line between Lansing, Michigan, and Kingsbury, Indiana, between 1871 and 1873. It was consolidated with the Port Huron and Lake Michigan Railroad in 1873 to form the Chicago and Lake Huron Railroad. Its line, still extant, became part of the Grand Trunk Western Railroad's main line between Port Huron, Michigan, and Chicago.

== History ==
The Peninsular Railway or Peninsular Railroad was the name of six different companies, all related to each other, incorporated in Illinois, Indiana, or Michigan. The earliest incarnation was the Peninsular Railway of Michigan, which was incorporated on October 3, 1865. It constructed no track before being consolidated with the Peninsular Railway Extension Company, another Michigan entity, on February 17, 1868. The new company was also known as the Peninsular Railway. In 1869, two new companies were incorporated in Illinois and Indiana: the Peninsular Railway (March 15, 1869), and the Peninsular Railroad (October 14, 1869).

The goal of the various companies was a new line between Lansing, Michigan, and Chicago, via Battle Creek, Michigan, and South Bend, Indiana. The Michigan company began laying track between Battle Creek and Lansing on September 14, 1869. Trains began running between Battle Creek and Bellevue, Michigan, a distance of approximately 13 miles (21 km), before the end of 1869. In Battle Creek, a connection was made with the Michigan Central Railroad.

The three companies voted to consolidate into a single company on February 9, 1870, and it formally took effect on May 9. The new company was also named the Peninsular Railway. Service to Charlotte, Michigan, 26 miles (42 km) from Battle Creek, began on February 14, 1870. The entire line between Battle Creek and Lansing, 45 miles (72 km) long, opened on June 13, 1870. In Charlotte, connection was made with the Grand River Valley Railroad. In Lansing, connections were made with the Jackson, Lansing and Saginaw Railroad and the Ionia and Lansing Railroad. (Note: Stimson and Dunbar give December 1869 as the date for the entire railroad. The ICC valuation report gives 1872.)

Work now commenced south of Battle Creek. The line between Battle Creek and Climax, Michigan, opened on October 15, 1870. This was further extended to Cassopolis, Michigan, on June 26, 1871. The line was finally opened to South Bend, 120 miles (190 km) from Lansing, on September 11, 1871. The company continued building west toward Chicago, eventually reaching Kingsbury, Indiana, 20 miles (32 km) from Valparaiso, Indiana. The Peninsular Railway and the Port Huron and Lake Michigan Railroad consolidated on August 15, 1873, to form the Chicago and Lake Huron Railroad.
