= Toronto Eastern Railway =

Railway in Ontario, Canada

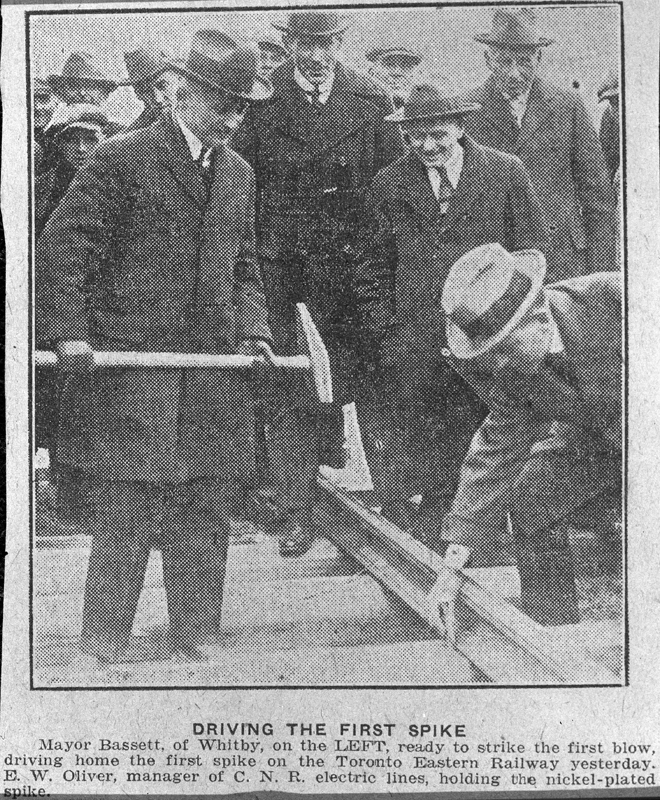
The mayor of Whitby, Norman Bassett, gets ready to drive the first spike on the Toronto Eastern Railway on 31 October 1923. Rails would be laid eastward from this point in downtown Whitby to Bownmanville.

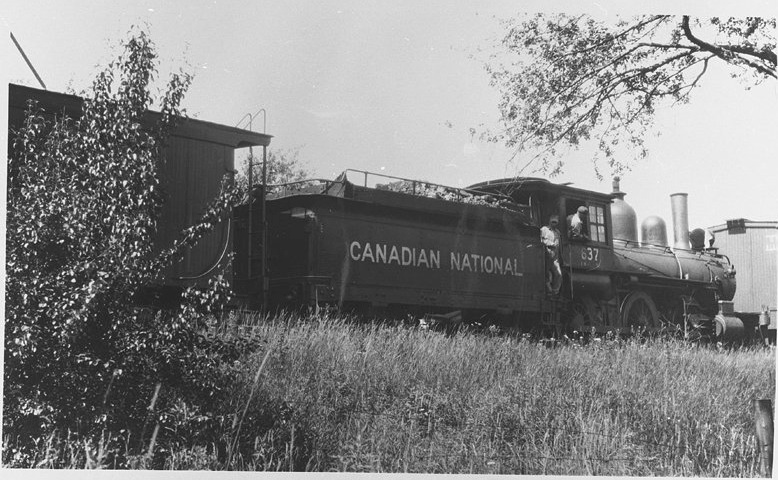
This image shows the eventual fate of the Toronto Eastern in 1927; a CNR train is dismantling the rails between Whitby and Oshawa.

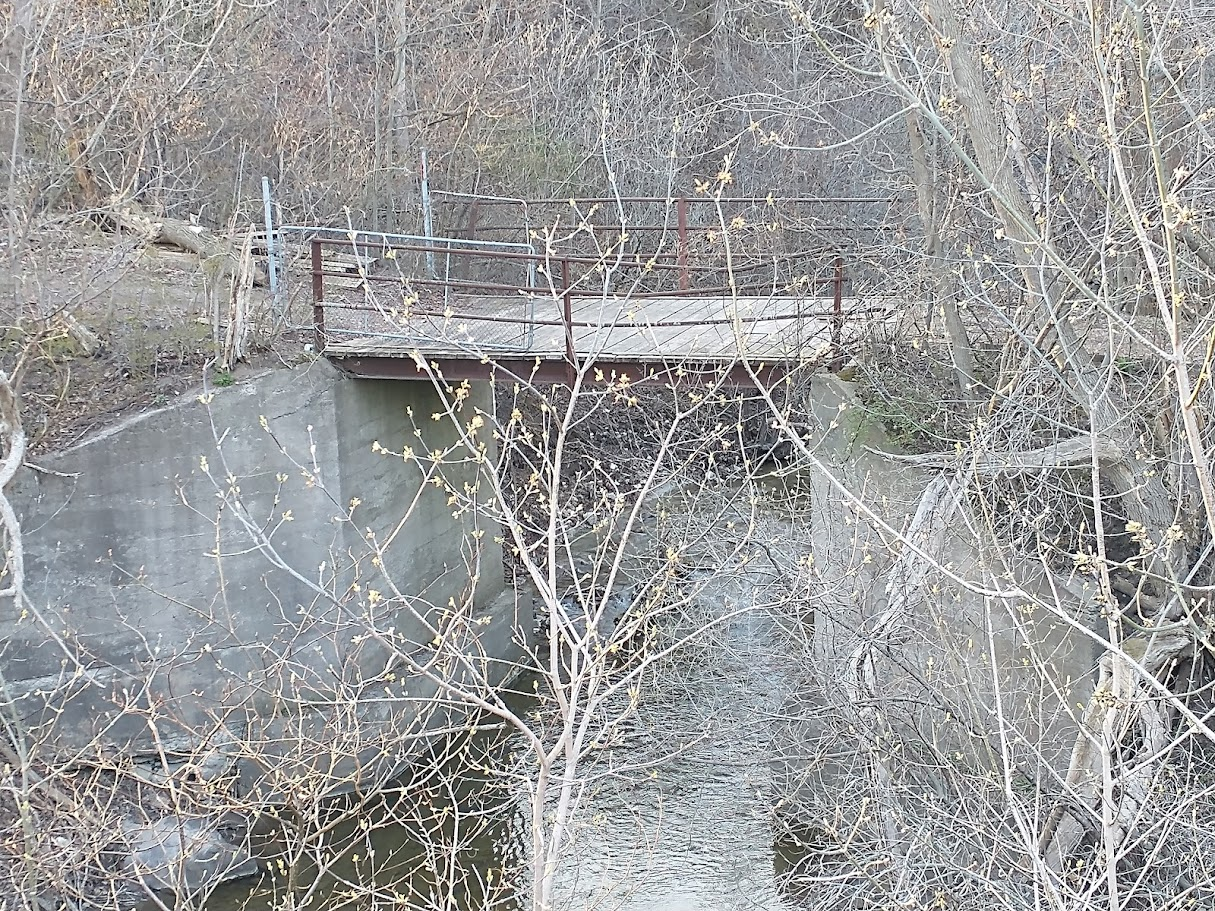
Toronto Eastern Railway bridge abutments over Farewell Creek, Courtice Ontario

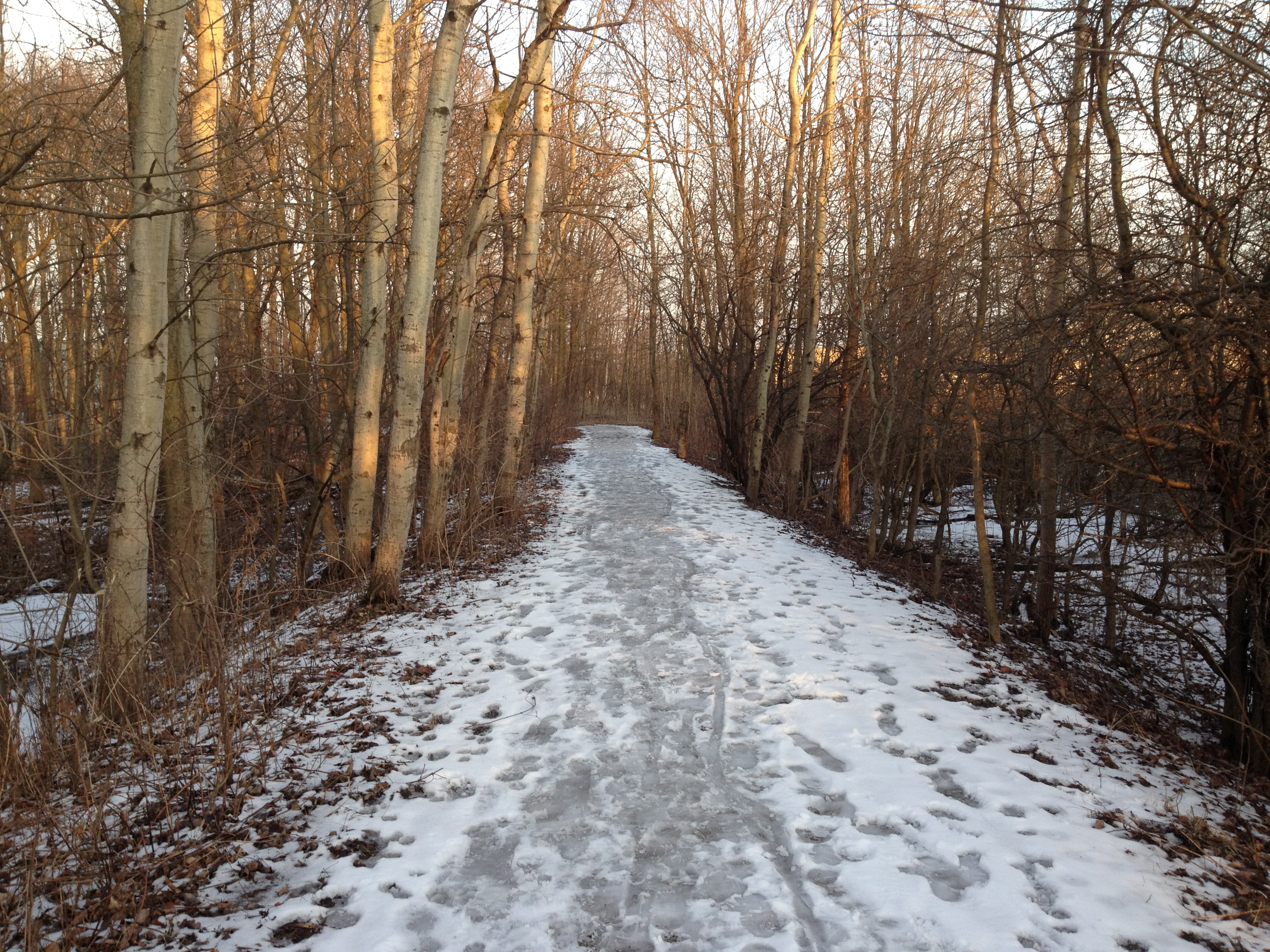
The berm of the railway shows up clearly in winter when snow improves the contrast. This section runs through Courtice towards Bowmanville.

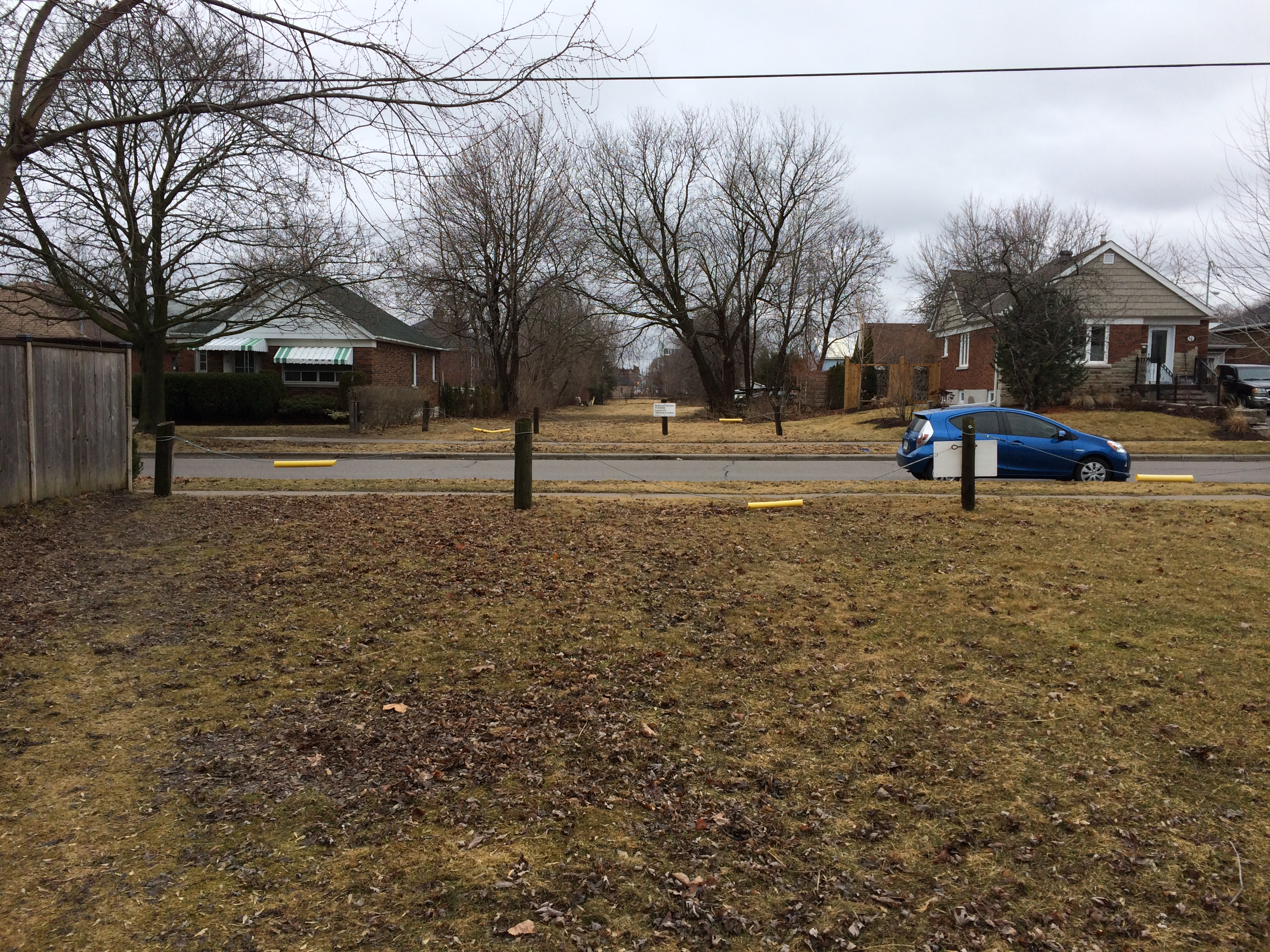
The railway ran through Oshawa on a separate right of way that has mostly been reused for roads and other purposes. This short section is one of the only portions left in the city.

The Toronto Eastern Railway, or Toronto and Eastern Railway, is a noted "ghost railroad" in southern Ontario, Canada. It was part of William Mackenzie's ambitious plan to provide high-speed electric "interurban" service throughout the district that first appeared in 1910; however, those plans fell afoul of World War I and, later, political manoeuvres.

The railway was incorporated on 4 April 1910 to build a high-speed route from Toronto east to Pickering, Whitby, and Oshawa. The company acquired by Canadian Northern Railway interests in 1911, who extended the proposal east of Oshawa to Bowmanville and Cobourg. They also applied for additional rights of way, north from Cobourg or Port Hope to Peterborough, north from Oshawa to Linsday, north from Scarborough to Markham, Stouffville or Uxbridge, and south from Oshawa to the shore of Lake Ontario. Construction begun on the mainline in 1912, and by 1913 track was in place from Bowmanville to Whitby, when construction halted.

In September 1918 the Canadian Northern was nationalized and reorganized as part of the Canadian National Railways (CNR). On 26 December 1923 CNR merged the Toronto Eastern with its other electric holdings to form the new Canadian National Electric Railways.*

- In 1923, existing tracks were reconstructed and new trackage built from Whitby to Pickering, and a few "test trains" were run. One of these carried the line's only passenger, an uninvited youth who sneaked onto a train in Bowmanville and disembarked when the train reached Oshawa.

In 1924, the Provincial government refused to provide the additional funds necessary to turn the project into an operating railway. Although this was largely due to the political infighting of the time, it is fairly certain that the new railway was already obsolete, since the ownership of automobiles (many built in Oshawa) was becoming much more common at that time. The Bowmanville to Whitby section, already fully built and ready for use, was abandoned then, with the railway having never carried a paying passenger. The rails were pulled up during World War II's steel shortages, as were any steel bridges or trestles.

Small portions of the railway were used for other purposes for a time. A section in Oshawa was incorporated into the Oshawa Railway Company, and about two miles of track to the Ontario Missionary College (today's Kingsway College) was used between 1924 and 1936 for freight service. After this a short section by Ritson Road was used by McCallum Transport to load cars from the General Motors "North Plant" in downtown Oshawa.

Most remaining traces of the railway have disappeared during the relentless "suburbanization" of the area. One lasting legacy is the alignment of roads in downtown Oshawa; Bond Street, the westbound section of Highway 2 through the city, suddenly turns north for a section, before re-joining King. Between the two is a long empty lot. This land is actually owned by Ontario Hydro, the legal successor to the railway, and carries a medium-voltage overhead line. A small portion of the old alignment is also used in Courtice, Ontario, as the basis for a walking trail, just west of the Courtice Community Complex. In addition, the abutments of the bridge that carried the railway across Farewell Creek can be seen north of Nash Road, about 100 metres east of Tooley Road.
