= Grand Rapids (disambiguation) =

Grand Rapids is a city in the U.S. state of Michigan.

Grand Rapids may also refer to:

== Places ==
In Canada:

- Grand Rapids, Manitoba
- Grand Rapids (Athabasca River)
- Grand Rapids, British Columbia
- Le Grand Rapide, Zec de la Rivière-Sainte-Marguerite, Sainte-Marguerite River, Quebec

In the United States:

- Grand Rapids metropolitan area, Michigan
- Grand Rapids, Minnesota
- Grand Rapids, North Dakota
- Grand Rapids, Ohio, a village in Wood County
- Grand Rapids, Wisconsin, a town in Wood County
- The city of Wisconsin Rapids, Wisconsin, also in Wood County, formerly named Grand Rapids

== Transportation ==
- Grand Rapids Airport (disambiguation)

=== Railroads ===
- Grand Rapids, Grand Haven and Muskegon Railway
- Grand Rapids, Newaygo and Lake Shore Railroad
- Grand Rapids and Indiana Railroad
- Grand Rapids Terminal Railroad
- Grand Rapids Branch

=== Vehicles ===
- USS Grand Rapids, a U.S. Navy shipname
- USS Grand Rapids (PF-31), a WWII U.S. Navy Tacoma-class frigate
- USS Grand Rapids (PG-98), a Vietnam War U.S. Navy Asheville-class gunboat

== Schools ==
- Grand Rapids High School, Grand Rapids, Minnesota, USA
- Grand Rapids High School (Michigan), Grand Rapids, Michigan, USA
- Grand Rapids Community College, Grand Rapids, Michigan, USA

== Other uses ==
- Grand Rapids Hotel, Mount Carmel, Illinois, USA
- Grand Rapids Dam, Wabash River, Illinois-Indiana, USA

== See also ==
- Great Rapids, Holyoke Canal System, Connecticut River, Massachusetts, USA
- Grand Rapids Township (disambiguation)
- Grand Rapids station (disambiguation)
