= Grand Rapids station =

Grand Rapids station may refer to:

== Transport ==
- Vernon J. Ehlers Station, Grand Rapids, Michigan, US; an Amtrak passenger train station
- Grand Rapids Union Station, Grand Rapids, Michigan, US; a union station for multiple train companies
- Rapid Central Station, Grand Rapids, Michigan, US; intermodal motorbus-motorcoach terminal

== Broadcast ==
- WOOD-TV, NBC 8, Grand Rapids, Michigan, US
- WOTV-TV, ABC 4, Grand Rapids-Battle Creek, Michigan, US
- WWMT-TV, CBS 3, Grand Rapids-Kalamazoo, Michigan, US
- WZZM-TV, ABC 13, Grand Rapids, Michigan, US

== Other uses ==
- Grand Rapids Air Force Station, Grand Rapids, Minnesota, US; a USAF surveillance station

== See also ==
- Grand Rapids Airport (disambiguation)
- Grand Rapids (disambiguation)
