= Toledo, Saginaw and Muskegon Railway =

Railway in Michigan

Map

The Toledo, Saginaw and Muskegon Railway is a defunct railroad incorporated in January, 1886. The railroad offered service between Ashley, Michigan and Muskegon, Michigan starting on August 1, 1888. The Grand Trunk Railway of Canada took control the same day, but the company did not merge with the Grand Trunk Western Railway until 1928.

== Financial background ==
The Toledo, Saginaw and Muskegon Railway (TS&M) was started by a group of Toledo Ohio investors headed by David Robinson Jr. and John Ashley, who at the time was also building the Toledo, Ann Arbor and North Michigan Railroad, which connected Ashley with Owosso, Michigan. The investors spent about $1,560,000 to build the line.

== Construction ==
Construction started in the spring of 1887 with building bridges and grading. Trackwork was started in August 1887 from Ashley westward. The track crews reached Carson City, Michigan on September 24. In October, another crew started laying rail from Egelston and Moorland Townships in Muskegon County eastward.

== Operation ==
The first freight train to Greenville over the new line was on November 12, when eleven cars of wheat from Carson City were delivered to E. Middleton & Sons flour mills. The two track crews met at a location just west of Cedar Springs on Christmas Day 1887, finishing the main track the entire 96 miles (154 km). The next day a mixed train (carrying freight and passengers) worked the line each way out of Muskegon and Ashley.

In the spring of 1888, the TS&M began running a full passenger train from Muskegon to Ashley and back. On August 1, 1888, the Grand Trunk Railway took control of the TS&M and the trains began using the Toledo, Ann Arbor, & Northern Michigan between Ashley and Owosso Junction. Operations consisted of mail and express trains #1 and 2 and mixed trains #5 and #6. Trains #1 and #5 were eastbound and trains #2 and #4 were westbound. Later, these trains were given Grand Trunk numbers #31 and #32 for the mail and express and #71 and #72 for the mixed trains.

By 1914, the mail and express trains numbers had changed again to #41 and #42 and the mixed trains to #471 and #472. These trains would continue to operate under these numbers for the next forty years. It was common for the TS&M to run second and third sections of trains #471 and #472. Because of the light rail (#60), the TS&M used American type (4-4-0)locomotives. Doubleheaders and extra freights were common. The Grand Trunk experimented with a steam powered motor car between Ashley and Muskegon. The motorcar, #2, started running as trains #43 and #44 from Ashley to Muskegon and back in January 1914. The motorcar broke down frequently and had to be replaced with a regular steam train. After about a year, the motorcar was discontinued.

In 1924, the right of way was rebuilt with #80 rail, and newer locomotives were used.

In 1928, the TS&M was merged along with other Michigan Grand Trunk Railway owned rail lines into the Grand Trunk Western Railroad, and the TS&M became the Muskegon Subdivision of the GTWRR.[2]

== List of operations ==
The railroad had stops in the following communities:[3]

- Ashley
- Ola
- Pompeii
- Perrinton
- Middleton
- Carson City
- Vickeryville
- Butternut
- Sheridan
- Millers
- Greenville - The line west of Greenville was abandoned in 1946.
- Lincoln Lake
- Harvard (originally called Griswold)
- Evans
- Sheffield
- Cedar Springs
- Reeds
- Sparta
- Gooding (originally called Lisbon)
- Harrisburg
- Slocum (originally called Slocum's Grove)
- Moorland
- Muskegon

Information from TS&M timetables The TS&M also had interlocking towers at the following locations:

- Virgil (Sheridan) - Detroit, Lansing & Northern
- Greenville - DL&N
- Cedar Springs - Grand Rapids and Indiana Railroad
- Saxon (Sparta) - Chicago & West Michigan
- Simpson (Muskegon) - C&WM

== Notes ==
- TS&M and GT Rwy timetables, Greenville Independent newspaper from 1887 to 1888, The Grand Rapids Press Jan. 21st, 1914, The Owosso Argus-Press May 31, 1946.
- TS&M and GT Rwy timetables.
- Grand Trunk train orders from 1912 and 1914.
