= USS Grand Rapids =

USS Grand Rapids may refer to:

- USS Grand Rapids (PF-31), was commissioned 10 October 1944 and sold 14 April 1947 for scrapping
- USS Grand Rapids (PG-98), was commissioned 5 September 1970
