= EMD GP38AC =

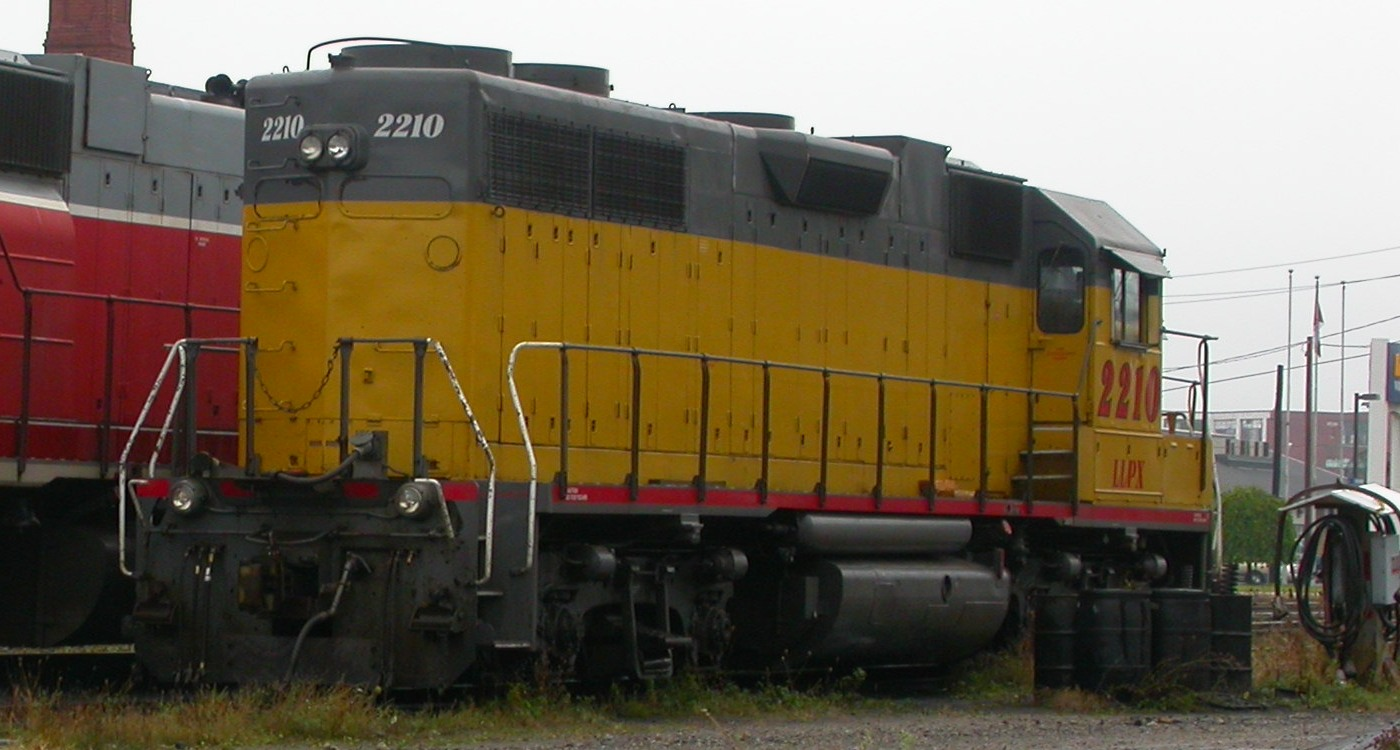
- LLPX 2210
Type and origin
- Power type: Diesel-electric
- Builder: General Motors Electro-Motive Division (EMD)
- Model: GP38AC
- Build date: February 1970 - December 1971
- Total produced: 261
Specifications
- Configuration
  - AAR: B-B
  - UIC: Bo'Bo'
- Gauge: 4 ft 8 1/2 in (1,435 mm) standard gauge
- Prime mover: EMD 16-645E
Career
- Locale: United States

The EMD GP38AC is a 4-axle diesel-electric locomotive built by General Motors Electro-Motive Division between February 1970 and December 1971. It was basically a GP38 with an AR10 alternator instead of the GP38's normal generator.

261 examples of this model were built; railroads that purchased this model include CP, DT&I, GTW, GM&O, IC, LV, L&N, N&W, SLSF, SOU and Pacific Power and Light.

Many were upgraded to full GP38-2 status with the Dash 2 modular electrical cabinet.

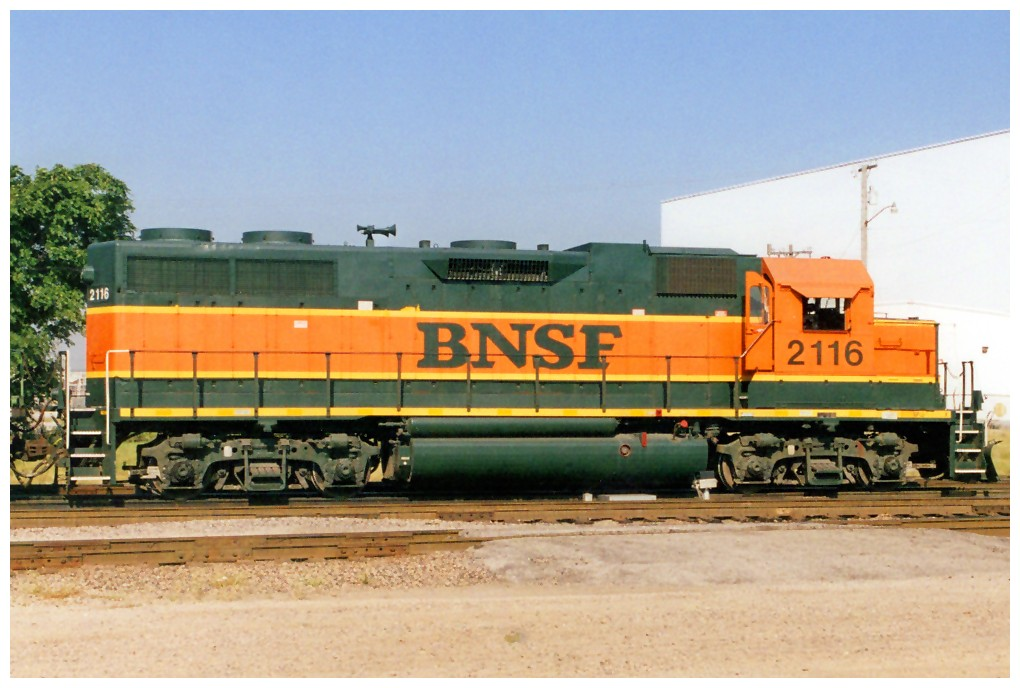
BNSF 2116 EMD GP38AC

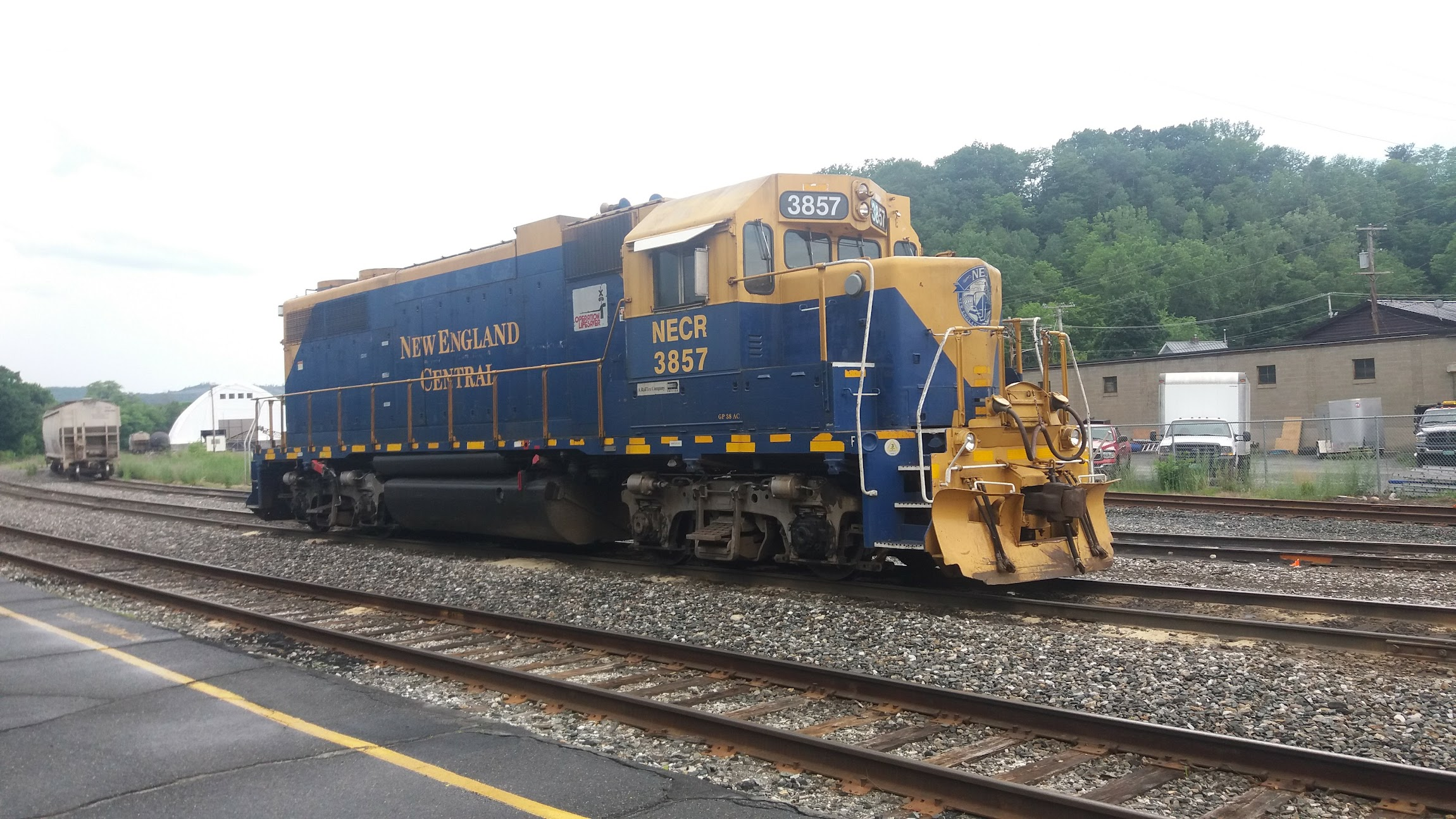
New England Central Railroad EMD GP 38 AC Unit #3857 at White River Junction, VT

== Original buyers ==
Railroad	Quantity	Road numbers	Notes
CP Rail	21	3000-3020	
Detroit, Toledo and Ironton Railroad	14	210-217	215 renumbered 209, 216 renumbered 208, 217 renumbered 207; to Grand Trunk Western Railroad 6207-6214
Detroit, Toledo and Ironton Railroad	14	215-220	To Grand Trunk Western Railroad 6215-6220
Grand Trunk Western Railroad	12	5800-5811	
Gulf, Mobile and Ohio Railroad	13	721-733	To Illinois Central 9540-9552
Illinois Central Railroad	20	9500-9519	
Lehigh Valley Railroad	4	310-313	To Conrail 7656-7659, and then to Norfolk Southern 2881-2884, Rebuilt into remote control yard slugs in 2007
Louisville and Nashville Railroad	30	4020-4049	To Seaboard System Railroad 6241-6270 then to CSX
Norfolk and Western Railway	60	4100-4159	To Norfolk Southern.
Pacific Power & Light Company	1	11	To Arizona Public Service - Pacificorp Cholla Power Plant
Southern Railway	56	2823–2878	To Norfolk Southern.
St. Louis – San Francisco Railway	30	633-662	651 wrecked, remaining to Burlington Northern Railroad 2110-2138 and later to BNSF. Some of them were rebuilt as GP38-3R or GP39-3
Totals	261		

== Preservation ==
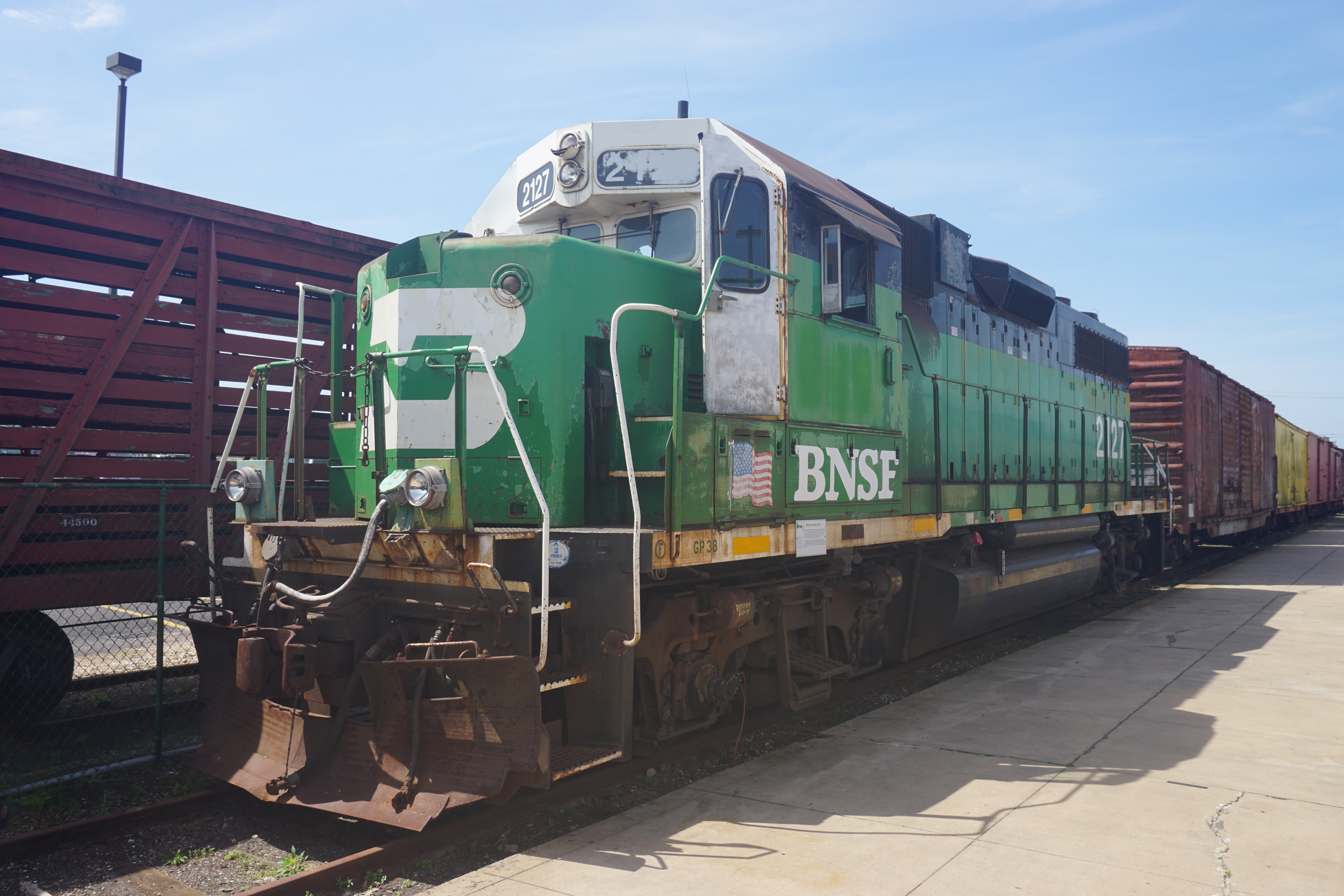
* BNSF Railway EMD GP38AC No. 2127 at the Galveston Railroad Museum

- BNSF #2127 (originally Frisco #650 built in February 1971) is preserved at the Galveston Railroad Museum in Galveston, Texas. It was donated by BNSF in June 2020.
