= Detroit, Grand Haven and Milwaukee Railway =

American defunct railroad

Map

The Detroit, Grand Haven and Milwaukee Railway is a defunct railroad which operated in the US state of Michigan during the late 19th and early 20th centuries. Itself the product of several consolidations in the 1870s, it became part of the Grand Trunk Western Railroad in 1928.

The DGH&M was formed from the ruin of Detroit and Milwaukee Railroad, a successor road to the Detroit and Pontiac Railroad, one of the first roads organized in the state of Michigan. The Great Western Railway, a Canadian company, had taken financial control of the D&M in 1860 after it defaulted on debt payments. The D&M entered receivership in 1875; in 1878 Great Western purchased it outright and refinanced the debts. The reorganized company bore the name Detroit, Grand Haven & Milwaukee Railway. Its Grand Rapids, Michigan station was located at the corner of Plainfield and East Leonard.

The new company possessed a 189-mile (304 km) line stretching from Detroit in the southeast to Grand Haven on the eastern shore of Lake Michigan. By 1882 the road came under the ownership of the Grand Trunk Railway of Canada when the Grand Trunk acquired the Great Western, but it was not formally consolidated until 1928.
