= Chicago, Kalamazoo and Saginaw Railway =

Railway in Michigan

Map

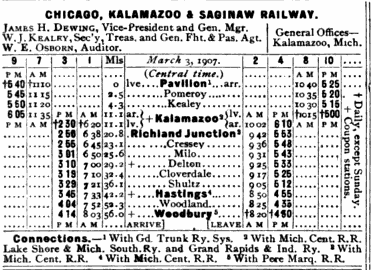
A CK&S timetable from 1908.

The Chicago, Kalamazoo and Saginaw Railway (CK&S), known informally as the "Cuss, Kick & Swear" is a defunct railroad which operated in southwest Michigan in the late 19th and early to mid 20th centuries. Despite the name, the line ran entirely within the state of Michigan, with the majority in Kalamazoo County. It eventually became part of the New York Central. As of 2010, most of the former CK&S tracks have since been abandoned.

== History ==
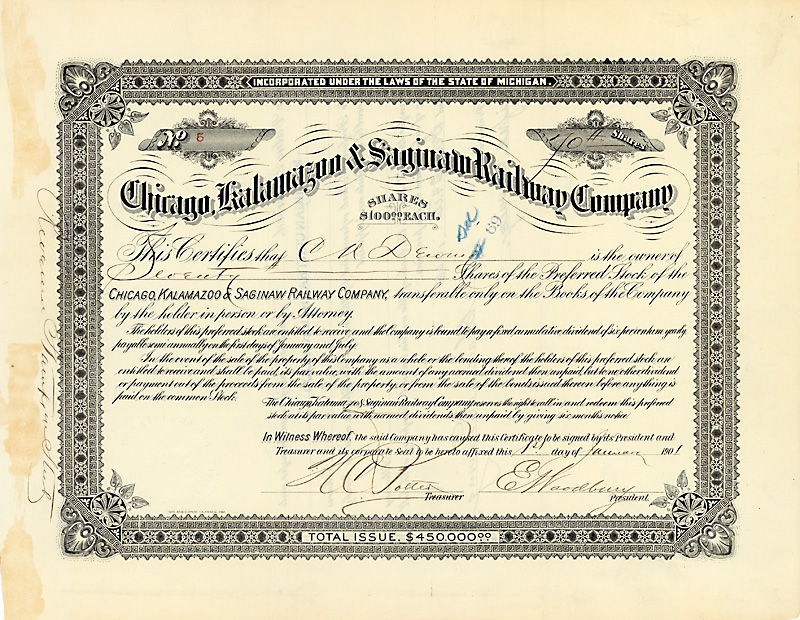
Preferred Share of the Chicago, Kalamazoo & Saginaw Railway Company from the 1st January 1901

The company incorporated on June 7, 1883, with the initial intent of constructing a 31-mile (50 km) line from Kalamazoo northeast to Hastings. On October 29, 1887, the company amended its articles, now calling for a line of 141 miles (227 km) connecting the Chicago and Grand Trunk Railway's line in northeastern Cass County to Saginaw. This grandiose vision never came to pass; the company's completed line stretched a mere 14 miles (23 km) beyond Hastings.

In 1906 the CK&S was leased by the Michigan Central Railroad–the Central took 60% control, while the Lake Shore and Michigan Southern Railway, itself owned by the New York Central Railroad, took 40%. In 1930 the New York Central, having merged with the LS&MS in 1915 and leased the Michigan Central in 1930, leased the CK&S. The New York Central continued to operate the CK&S under its own name until 1968, when Conrail bought the remaining properties.

== Operation ==
Despite its name, the line linked neither Chicago, Illinois nor Saginaw, Michigan, although it did pivot on Kalamazoo, Michigan. Construction started in 1886 between Kalamazoo, Michigan and Hastings, Michigan; this section was completed by 1888. On September 1, 1889, the northern branch reached Woodbury, on the northwest edge of Eaton county, where it met the Detroit, Lansing and Northern Railroad (later the Pere Marquette Railroad). On December 1, 1901, the southern terminus was extended to Pavilion, Michigan, in southern Kalamazoo County, where it met the Grand Trunk Railway, for a total length of 44 miles (71 km).

A 1909 report by the Michigan Railroad Commission found that the CK&S operated three trains in each direction daily; two passenger and one freight.

In 1910, the Grand Trunk Western leased the line from Kalamazoo to Pavilion; the CK&S converted the rump to yard service. In 1937, the CK&S abandoned the section between Delton and Woodbury; in 1942, it cut back further to Richland Junction. In 1978, Conrail abandoned the line to Richland as well, leaving only yard trackage within Kalamazoo itself.

On July 25, 1930, the CK&S purchased a 13.2-mile (21.2 km) line from the dying Michigan United Railways. This line ran south from Hooper to Richland, and crossed the CK&S's main line at Richland Junction, 2.9 miles (4.7 km) north of Richland proper. The CK&S converted the track from electrified interurban to standard operation. In 1961, it cut the line back to Doster, and in 1978 Conrail abandoned the rest. Except for the portion from Kalamazoo to Pavilion where Grand Elk RR uses it to connect with CN.
