= Grand Trunk Western Railroad =

American railroad

Overview
- Headquarters: Montreal, Quebec
- Reporting mark: GTW
- Locale: Michigan, Illinois, Indiana, Ohio
- Dates of operation: 1859–1991
- Successor: Canadian National Railway

Technical
- Track gauge: 4 ft 8 1/2 in (1,435 mm) standard gauge

The Grand Trunk Western Railroad Company (reporting mark GTW) was an American subsidiary of the Grand Trunk Railway, later of the Canadian National Railway (reporting mark CN) operating in Michigan, Illinois, Indiana, and Ohio. Since a corporate restructuring in 1971, the railroad has been under CN's subsidiary holding company, the Grand Trunk Corporation. Grand Trunk Western's routes are part of CN's Michigan Division. Its primary mainline between Chicago and Port Huron, Michigan, serves as a connection between railroad interchanges in Chicago and rail lines in eastern Canada and the Northeastern United States. The railroad's extensive trackage in Detroit and across southern Michigan has made it an essential link for the automotive industry as a haulier of parts and automobiles from manufacturing plants.

== Early history ==
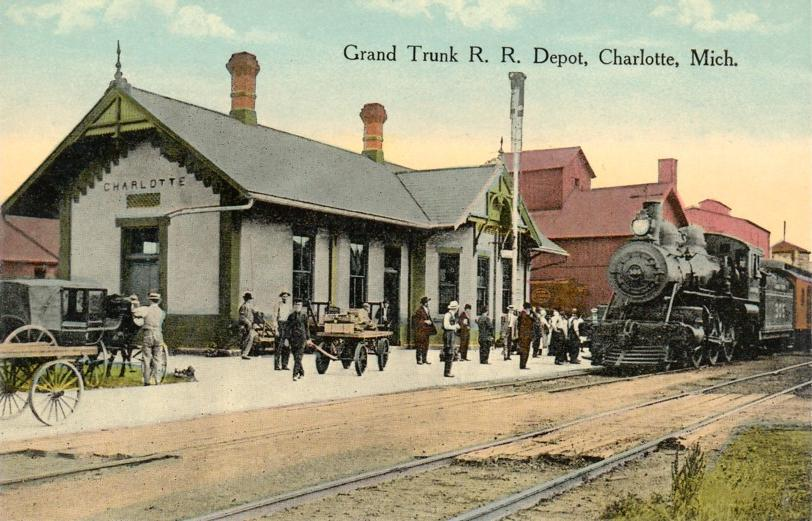
A 1912 postcard of the Grand Trunk depot at Charlotte, Michigan, built in 1885 by GTW predecessor Chicago and Grand Trunk Railroad

Grand Trunk Western grew out of a collection of 19th century Michigan rail lines which included:

- Bay City Terminal Railway
- Chicago, Detroit and Canada Grand Trunk Junction Railroad
- Chicago and Grand Trunk Railway
- Chicago, Kalamazoo and Saginaw Railway
- Chicago and Kalamazoo Terminal Railroad
- Chicago and Lake Huron
- Chicago and Northeastern
- Detroit, Grand Haven and Milwaukee Railway
- Detroit and Huron Railway
- Grand Rapids Terminal Railroad
- Michigan Air Line Railway
- Muskegon Railway and Navigation Company
- Peninsular Railway of Michigan and Indiana
- Pontiac, Oxford and Northern Railroad
- Toledo, Saginaw and Muskegon Railway

=== Mainline ===
Grand Trunk Western began as a route for the Grand Trunk Railway (GTR) to link its line to Chicago through lower Michigan. GTR's objective was to have a mainline from shipping ports in Portland, Maine, to rail connections in Chicago through the southern part of the Province of Canada that would serve Toronto and Montreal.

In 1859 the Grand Trunk completed its route to Sarnia, Canada West, and began a ferry service across the St. Clair River to Port Huron. GTR leased the Chicago, Detroit and Canada Grand Trunk Junction Railroad to reach Detroit and from there then ran over the Michigan Central Railroad's line from Detroit into Chicago. It was on the line from Port Huron to Detroit that a 12-year-old Thomas Edison held his first job as a newsboy and candy butcher onboard passenger trains. Grand Trunk established its own route to Chicago across Michigan when the New York Central Railroad's William Henry Vanderbilt took over control of the Michigan Central in 1878. GTR sought to put together a route by acquiring three railroads it had already been sending some of its Chicago-bound trains on since 1877. The Chicago and Lake Huron Railroad, the Chicago and Northeastern Railroad (C&NE) and the Peninsular Railway of Michigan and Indiana together formed a direct route from Port Huron through Flint and Lansing, Michigan, to Valparaiso, Indiana, where it connected into Chicago on the Pittsburgh, Fort Wayne & Chicago Railroad. However, Vanderbilt owned the Chicago and Northeastern section of the route from Flint to Lansing and charged Grand Trunk higher rates to move its freight over the line. Vanderbilt soon sold the C&NE to Grand Trunk when GTR bought the other two lines in 1879 and proposed building its own route between Flint and Lansing just north of Vanderbilt's line. Grand Trunk completed its own route into Chicago from Valparaiso in 1880 and incorporated the entire line from Port Huron to Chicago as the Chicago and Grand Trunk Railway.

=== More routes ===
Over the next two decades through either leases or purchases Grand Trunk acquired several other branch lines in Michigan. It took control of the Michigan Air Line Railway through a lease in 1881. The line connected with the Chicago, Detroit and Canada Grand Trunk Junction at Richmond and ran to Jackson, through Romeo and Pontiac, Michigan. When Grand Trunk purchased the Great Western Railway in 1882 it also acquired the Detroit, Grand Haven and Milwaukee Railway (DGH&M), which Great Western had owned since 1877. The DGH&M gave Grand Trunk a route from Detroit through Pontiac, Durand and Grand Rapids to Grand Haven, Michigan, where it began its Lake Michigan railcar ferry operations in 1902. The DGH&M connected with the Chicago and Grand Trunk at Durand and with the Chicago, Detroit and Canada Grand Trunk Junction in Detroit. Durand became a major junction point for Grand Trunk when it continued to increase its mileage. It acquired the 96-mile (154 km) Toledo, Saginaw and Muskegon Railway from Ashley to Muskegon, Michigan, in 1888. GTR obtained trackage rights to reach the line at Ashley from Owosso, Michigan, with the Toledo, Ann Arbor and North Michigan Railway, the predecessor of the Ann Arbor Railroad. Grand Trunk acquired a route into Saginaw, Michigan, in 1890 with the lease of the Cincinnati, Saginaw & Mackinaw Railroad from Durand to Bay City, Michigan. The line was the last to be held as a leased property until January 1943, when it was fully merged into Grand Trunk Western.

=== Western Division ===
By 1900 Grand Trunk united the operations of the Chicago and Grand Trunk Railway and all of its lines in Michigan, Illinois and Indiana under a subsidiary company called the Grand Trunk Western Railway Company. The name derived from the fact that GTR's rail lines west of the St. Clair and Detroit rivers were referred to as its Western Division. The lines had also operated under the name Grand Trunk Railway System. Pontiac also continued to become another important junction point when the Pontiac Oxford and Northern Railroad was acquired in 1909. It ran north from Pontiac to Caseville in Michigan's thumb region. By 1910, GTW had a network of trackage connecting all of lower Michigan's major manufacturing cities when it acquired a lease on a short branch of the Chicago, Kalamazoo and Saginaw Railroad giving it access to Kalamazoo, Michigan. A few years before, in 1902, GTW had gained access into Ohio with its shared ownership of the Detroit and Toledo Shore Line Railroad. The line was a small carrier that had a multi-track mainline bridging Detroit and Toledo, Ohio, and was purchased equally by GTW and the Toledo, St. Louis and Western Railroad, a predecessor of the Nickel Plate Road. GTW eventually took complete control of the line when it bought Nickel Plate's half interest from its successor Norfolk and Western Railway in 1981.

=== Terminal railroads ===
Grand Trunk Western also owned or co-owned terminal switching railroad companies in some of the cities it operated in. Beginning in 1905, it co-owned equal shares of the Detroit Terminal Railroad with New York Central (NYC). By the 1970s Detroit Terminal was suffering financial losses, and GTW negotiated to sell its share to NYC's successors Penn Central and Conrail until it dropped its ownership in 1981. In Grand Rapids, Michigan, it acquired the Grand Rapids Terminal Railroad in 1906. In Bay City, Michigan, it owned the Bay City Terminal Railway and in Kalamazoo it took over the nearly 3-mile-long (4.8 km) Chicago and Kalamazoo Terminal Railroad by 1910. Prior to moving its ferry operations to Muskegon, GTW also acquired the railway belt-line Muskegon Railway and Navigation Company in 1924. The company existed as a GTW subsidiary until 1955. For its entry into Chicago GTW, along with the Erie, Wabash, Chicago and Eastern Illinois and Monon railroads, was a co-owner of the Chicago and Western Indiana Railroad (C&WI), beginning in 1883. It performed passenger and express car-switching duties at Chicago's Dearborn Station. GTW was also part of a group that created and shared ownership in the Belt Railway Company of Chicago, which connects every rail line in the Chicago area.

=== Canadian National ===
By 1919, GTW's parent, Grand Trunk Railway of Canada, was suffering financial problems related to its ownership of the Grand Trunk Pacific Railway. The Canadian government nationalized Grand Trunk and other financially troubled Canadian rail companies by 1923 and amalgamated them into a new government-owned entity, the Canadian National Railway. GTW became a subsidiary of the new entity and was reincorporated as the Grand Trunk Western Railroad Company on November 1, 1928, when nearly all of its lines were formally merged under the company.

=== River tunnel ===
GTW's predecessor Grand Trunk Railway also sought to expedite its rail service between Port Huron and Sarnia by constructing a rail tunnel under the St. Clair River. The St. Clair Tunnel, completed in 1891, approximately 6,000 feet (1,800 m) long and hand-dug, allowed Grand Trunk to discontinue its ferry service across the river. The tunnel was the last link in GTR's complete mainline from Chicago through southern Canada. In 1992, Canadian National began construction of a new, larger tunnel next to the original tunnel to accommodate double-stacked intermodal containers and tri-level auto carriers used in freight train service. The new tunnel was completed in 1994 and dedicated on May 5, 1995. GTW also gained trackage rights in 1975 to use Penn Central's Detroit River Tunnel between Detroit and Windsor, Ontario. Penn Central's successor Conrail sold the tunnel to CN and Canadian Pacific Railway in 1985. Eventually, CN sold its share of the Detroit tunnel in 2000 after the new St. Clair tunnel was completed.

The railroad's first major line abandonment came in 1951 when it abandoned about half of the former Toledo, Saginaw and Muskegon Railway line from Muskegon to Greenville, Michigan. That same year, Grand Trunk Western bought its headquarters building at 131 West Lafayette Avenue in downtown Detroit. At the end of 1970, GTW operated 2,154 miles (3,467 km) of track on 946 miles (1,522 km) of road, and that year it reported 2,732 million net revenue ton-miles of freight and 49 million passenger-miles.

== Grand Trunk Corporation ==
After several years of Canadian National subsidizing the financial losses of Grand Trunk Western, a new holding company would be established by CN in 1971 to manage GTW. The Grand Trunk Corporation was created to shift full control of GTW operations to Detroit and begin a strategy to make the railroad profitable. CN's other American properties, the Central Vermont Railway and the Duluth, Winnipeg and Pacific Railway (DW&P), would also be placed under the new corporation initially for tax purposes.

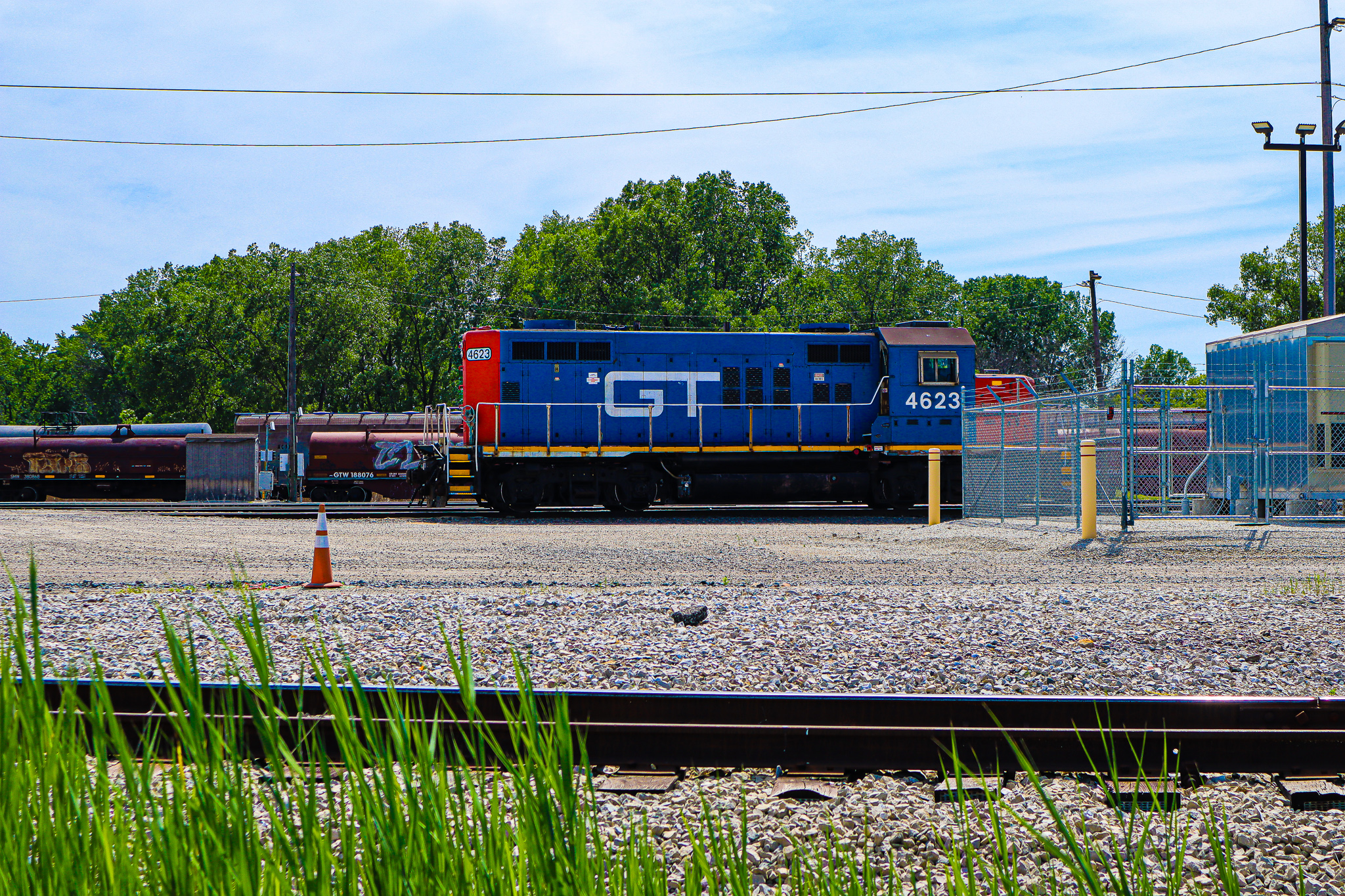
GTW GP9R #4623 sits in CN's Green Bay yard.

With the new corporation came a new autonomy for GTW from its parent CN. Grand Trunk Western had always shared equipment, color schemes and corporate logos with Canadian National. It shared CN's herald styles with its own name on the previous "tilted herald" and "Maple Leaf" logos. In 1960, when CN launched its new image, GTW had its own initials incorporated into the "wet noodle" logo and followed with CN's black red/orange and gray locomotive color scheme. However, to show its new autonomy from CN, in 1971 GTW began receiving its new locomotives in its famous bright-blue, red/orange and white scheme. Most of GTW's freight cars also received the blue and white color scheme. With new management, the railroad implemented a new strategy to market to shippers and improve its performance. In 1975, the railroad adopted its company slogan: The Good Track Road. This slogan promoted GTW's track maintenance efforts at a time when many Eastern and Midwest railroads suffered from deferred maintenance. The company also encouraged better safety practices, which earned it the E.H. Harriman Award for safety five times in the 1980s.

=== Detroit, Toledo and Ironton merger ===
Part of the railroad's new strategy in the 1970s and 1980s was to seek new routes to expand and compete in the long-haul railroad market. After Conrail took over the railroad operations of Penn Central in 1976, the Penn Central Corporation sought to divest itself of its subsidiary, the Detroit, Toledo and Ironton Railroad (DT&I). After petitioning the Interstate Commerce Commission, GTW won approval over a joint bid by Norfolk and Western and Chessie System to acquire the DT&I in June, 1980. The acquisition increased GTW's trackage around Detroit's industries, including Ford Motor Company's large River Rouge Complex, DT&I's classification hump yard in Flat Rock, Michigan and routes south into Ohio with access to rail interchanges in Cincinnati, Ohio. As part of the ICC's approval, GTW was obligated to divest its half or buy Norfolk and Western's share in the Detroit and Toledo Shore Line. It purchased N&W's share in April 1981 for $1.9 million and completely merged the line into GTW later that same year.

=== Milwaukee Road ===
Grand Trunk Western sought to further expand its trackage by seeking to purchase one of the bankrupt Midwest railroads, the Milwaukee Road or the Rock Island, in the 1970s. After inspecting the Rock Island's property and finding its trackage in need of costly repairs, GTW turned its attention in 1981 to acquiring the Milwaukee Road. GTW saw the acquisition of the Milwaukee Road (shorn of its Pacific Coast Extension and many of its midwestern branchlines) as an opportunity to expand its route further south and west to rail interchanges in Kansas City, Missouri, and Louisville, Kentucky. It would also afford GTW the opportunity to connect directly with its corporate cousin, the DW&P, at Duluth, Minnesota. Instead of initially placing a bid for the Milwaukee Road and seeking immediate ICC approval, GTW embarked on a strategy to improve the line's revenue and track maintenance. GTW and Milwaukee Road would enter into a voluntary coordination agreement where GTW would direct more of its shipments over the Milwaukee Road's route. It would also launch a marketing effort promoting the merger. However, as the Milwaukee Road became more successful, two other potential bidders, the Soo Line Railroad and the Chicago and North Western Railway, petitioned the ICC to purchase the railroad. Despite GTW's efforts, the ICC rejected its bid and, after a further bidding war between the Soo and the C&NW, approved the Soo Line's acquisition of the Milwaukee Road. The two roads were merged in January, 1986.

=== Improving efficiency and downsizing ===
During the 1970s and 1980s, Grand Trunk Western would continue to improve its efficiency and embark on efforts to improve its operating ratio. It had consolidated some of its operations, including dispatching in Pontiac, locomotive maintenance in Battle Creek and railcar maintenance in Port Huron. Its intercity passenger train operations would be handed over to Amtrak on May 1, 1971. Responsibility for GTW's commuter rail operation in Detroit was turned over in 1974 to the regional transportation authority SEMTA. GTW moved into the intermodal freight business by creating intermodal transfer yards in Chicago in 1975, and suburban Detroit in 1978. The railroad's president at the time, John H. Burdakin, was also a proponent of the Automatic Car Identification (ACI) system. It was a means to identify the location of shipments and equipment with bar code labels on the sides of freight cars and locomotives. The labels were read by automatic scanners at various rail yards. When Conrail was formed in 1976, GTW sought to acquire some of its routes in Michigan. It gained 151 miles (243 km) of trackage between Saginaw and Bay City as well as near Muskegon and Midland, Michigan. Several of GTW's cuts in its expenditures came from reductions in its workforce through changes it negotiated in union work rules. In 1978, it discontinued its Lake Michigan railcar ferry operations after several years of annual financial losses of over $1 million. By 1987, the company sold its headquarters building on Lafayette Avenue in Detroit and moved to the new office-park complex Brewery Park. The complex was developed on the site of the former Stroh's Brewery near downtown Detroit. Locomotive performance was also enhanced with a rebuilding program of its EMD GP9s. By the 1990s, several miles of routes and facilities were abandoned or sold to regional rail companies. GTW would eliminate all of the former Pontiac, Oxford and Northern line north of General Motors' Lake Orion manufacturing plant by 1985. In 1987, the former Cincinnati, Saginaw, and Mackinaw and the former Detroit, Grand Haven and Milwaukee routes north of Durand were sold to the Central Michigan Railway. Elsdon Yard, GTW's primary terminal and rail yard in Chicago, had been downsized and closed by 1990. It had also sold almost the entire route of the Detroit, Toledo and Ironton in 1997 to the shortline rail operator Railtex. By 1998, it had abandoned the entire former Michigan Air Line route except for a portion in Oakland County, Michigan, which it sold to Coe Rail. With the end of SEMTA commuter rail service to downtown Detroit, in 1983, GTW abandoned and sold its trackage from the Milwaukee Junction area to downtown Detroit. That line was the former route to Brush Street Station and its railcar ferry dock on the Detroit River. It is known as the Dequindre Cut, which has been transformed into an urban greenway rail trail. By the year 2000, engine terminals and maintenance facilities had also been eliminated or downsized in Chicago, Detroit, Durand, Pontiac, Port Huron and Battle Creek.

=== CN North America ===
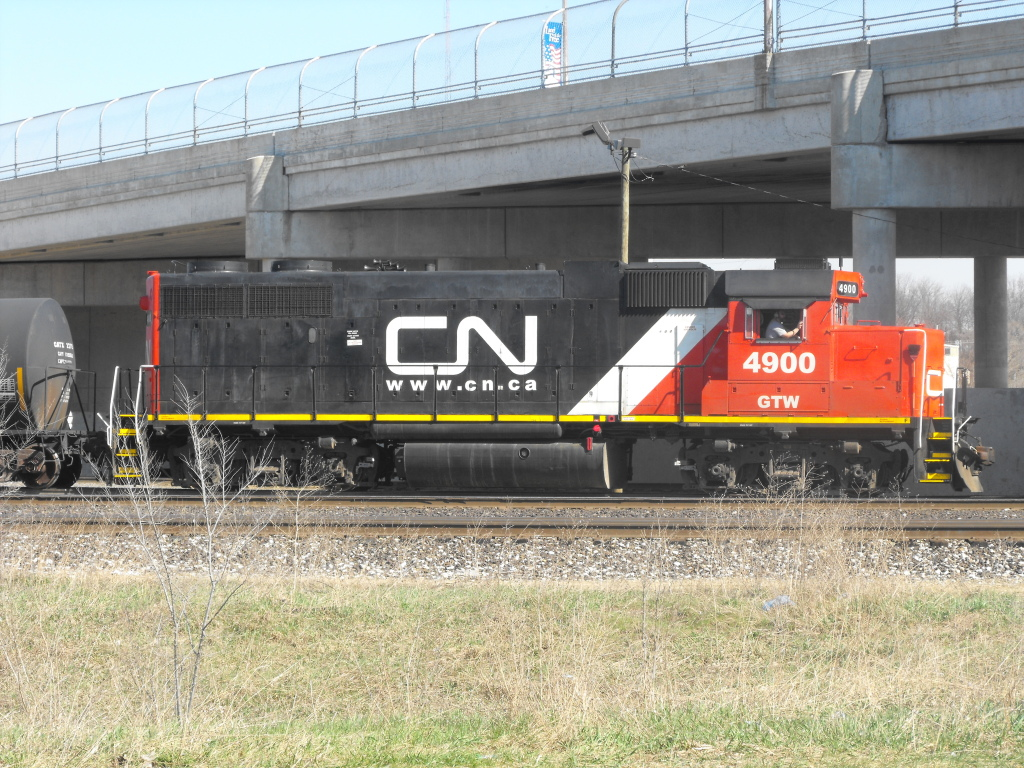
Grand Trunk Western GP38-2 4900 at Battle Creek, Michigan in the CN color scheme with GTW reporting marks

In December 1991, Canadian National announced a corporate image and restructuring program to consolidate all of its U.S. railroads under the CN North America brand. Grand Trunk Western, along with other CN owned subsidiaries, would see their images replaced with the CN logo and name. All GTW corporate identification and that of its new corporate cousins, the Illinois Central Railroad (acquired by CN in 1999) and Wisconsin Central Ltd. (acquired by CN in 2001), are referred-to with CN's name and corporate image. However, while each railroad's locomotives would eventually receive CN's logo and black, red-orange and white paint scheme, they would still retain their respective reporting marks. Despite the corporate re-branding, GTW's blue color scheme and its logo would persist on rolling stock and locomotives for several years while they were slowly either repainted or retired. CN also reintegrated managerial and some operational control of GTW, as it would gradually shift out of Detroit and into CN headquarters in Montreal. GTW would continue to maintain some office and dispatching functions from offices in suburban Troy, Michigan. All the routes that make up GTW are part of CN's Midwest Division in its Michigan Zone. Grand Trunk Corporation, now formally headquartered at CN in Montreal, is the holding company for almost all of CN's U.S. properties, which include Grand Trunk Western, Illinois Central, Wisconsin Central, Duluth, Winnipeg & Pacific and Great Lakes Transportation, which includes the Bessemer & Lake Erie Railroad and the Duluth, Missabe and Iron Range Railway. The Association of American Railroads has considered the Grand Trunk Corporation as a single, non-operating Class I Railroad since 2002. Grand Trunk Western still exists as a corporate entity, but can now be considered a company on paper. CN refers to GTW's routes and operations in its corporate communications as the former Grand Trunk Western territory.

== Locomotives ==
=== Steam ===
Grand Trunk Western was one of the last U.S. railroads to employ steam locomotives. It ran the last scheduled steam passenger train in the United States on March 27, 1960, on its train #21 from Detroit's Brush Street Station north to Durand Union Station. The run drew thousands of rail enthusiasts. With 3,600 passengers holding tickets, train #21 had to be run in two sections (as two separate trains) to accommodate the excess of passengers. GTW U-3-b class 4-8-4 Northern-type locomotive 6319 led the first section of train #21 with 15 passenger cars, and GTW 4-8-4 Northern 6322 pulled the second section with 22 passenger cars. Steam was used on some freight trains until 1961.

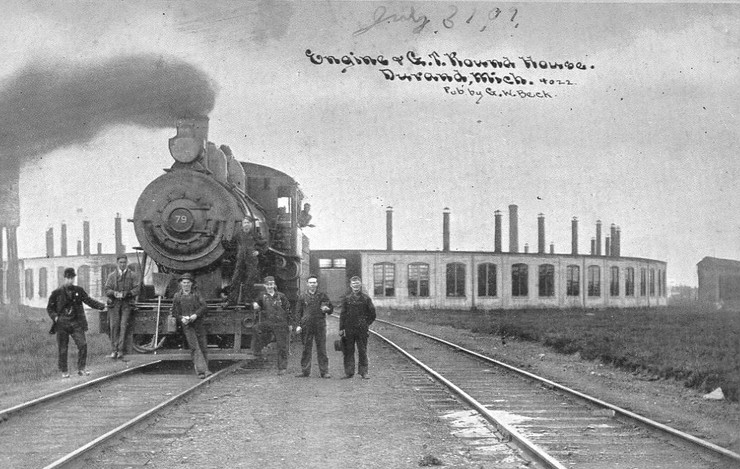
A 1909 photograph of a Grand Trunk Western locomotive and crew at the Durand, Michigan roundhouse

GTW's predecessor lines primarily used 4-4-0 American-type locomotives before the turn of the 20th century. Throughout its history, GTW has shared the same type and class designations of its locomotives with parents Grand Trunk Railway and Canadian National. Its locomotive road numbers would also be integrated into CN's roster sequence. By the first half of the 20th century, the railroad's largest steam power would be its Northern type 4-8-4 locomotives, called Confederations by CN. The locomotives, built by the American Locomotive Company in the 1930s and 1940s, had 73-inch (1.854 m) driving wheels with 60,000 pounds of tractive effort and would be used in mainline freight and passenger service. Six GTW U-4-b class 4-8-4s built by Lima Locomotive Works would have streamlined shrouding and 77-inch (1.956 m) driving wheels, to be used only in passenger service.

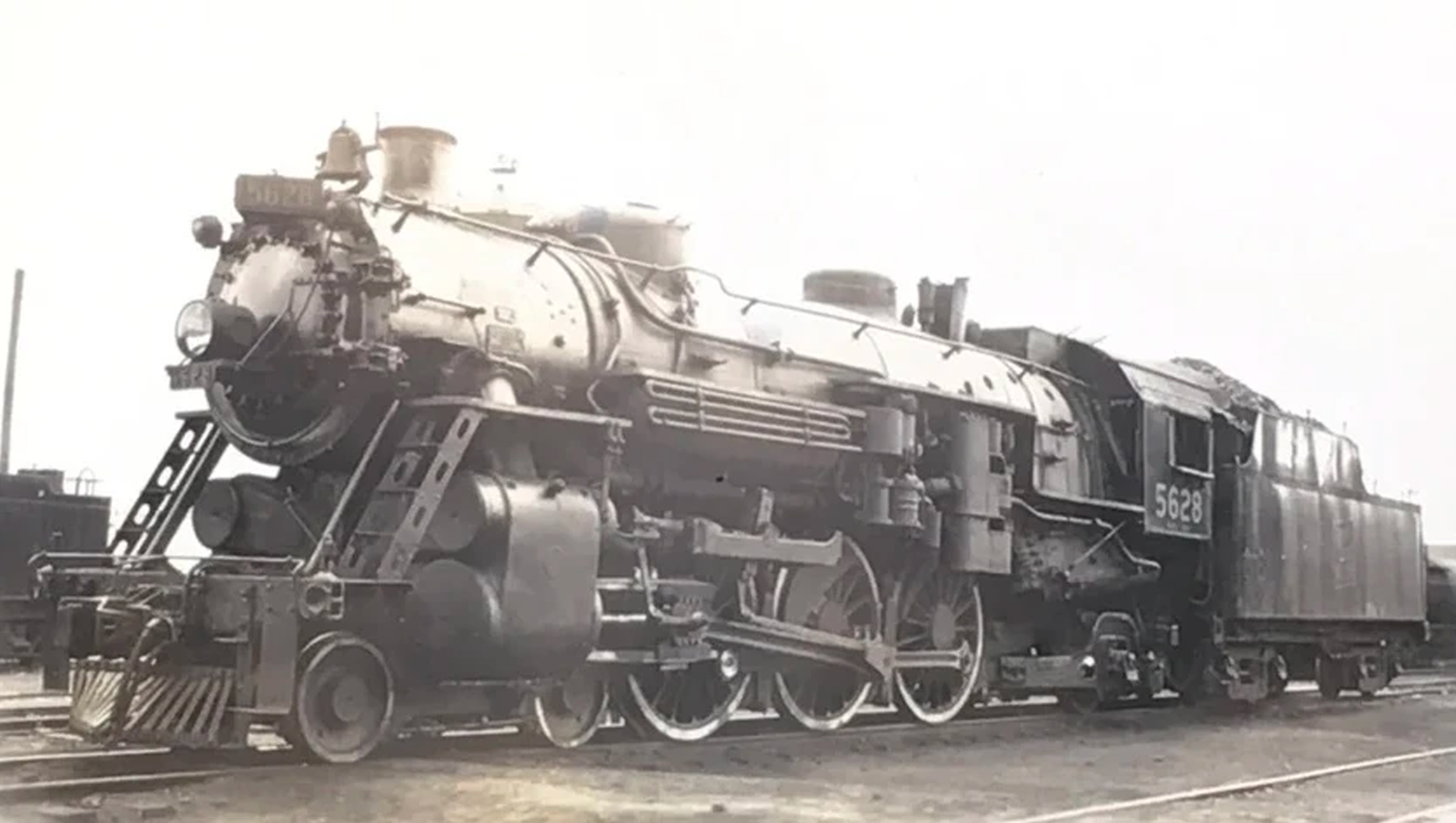
GTW class K-4-a #5628 in c. 1955

Other steam locomotives in GTW's fleet at the time included the Mikado type 2-8-2s built by Baldwin Locomotive Works and Alco, primarily used in mainline freight service. 4-6-2 Pacific type and 4-8-2 Mountain type locomotives, also built by the Baldwin Locomotive Works (BLW) and American Locomotive Company (ALCO) in the 1920s, and 4-6-0 Ten-Wheelers built around 1900 began in mainline service but later were eventually both found mostly on branch lines and mixed train service. GTW also had a variety of other models of steam engines, including several 0-8-0 and 0-6-0 switching locomotives used to move rolling stock around in rail yards.

==== Surviving steam locomotives ====
Some of GTW's steam engines survive today as static park displays or in operation. Three are park displays in Michigan; they include two 4-6-2 "Pacifics" at Durand and Jackson and an 0-6-0 at Sidney Montcalm Community College Heritage Village. Steamtown National Historic Site has GTW No. 6039, a U-1-c class 4-8-2 Mountain type. The Illinois Railway Museum in Union, Illinois, has U-3-b class 4-8-4 No. 6323, which was the last GTW steam locomotive to operate in regular service, and P-5-g class 0-8-0 No. 8380 as part of its collection. Locomotive No. 4070, an S-3-a class 2-8-2 Light Mikado, has been used in excursion service by the Midwest Railway Preservation Society and as of 2021 was being restored back to service in Cleveland, Ohio. The Age of Steam Roundhouse in Sugarcreek, Ohio, possesses U-3-b class No. 6325, which was previously restored and operated on the Ohio Central System from 2001 until 2004. One of the two 4-6-2s in Michigan, K-4b 5632, is on display in Durand. J-3-b No. 5030 was purchased in February 2021 by the Colebrookdale Railroad, which has the intent of restoring it to operating condition after moving it to Boyertown, Pennsylvania. Although there was a third Pacific, K-4a 5629, that was used on excursions from the 1960s to 1970s, it was scrapped in July 1987, in Blue Island, Illinois.

=== Diesel ===
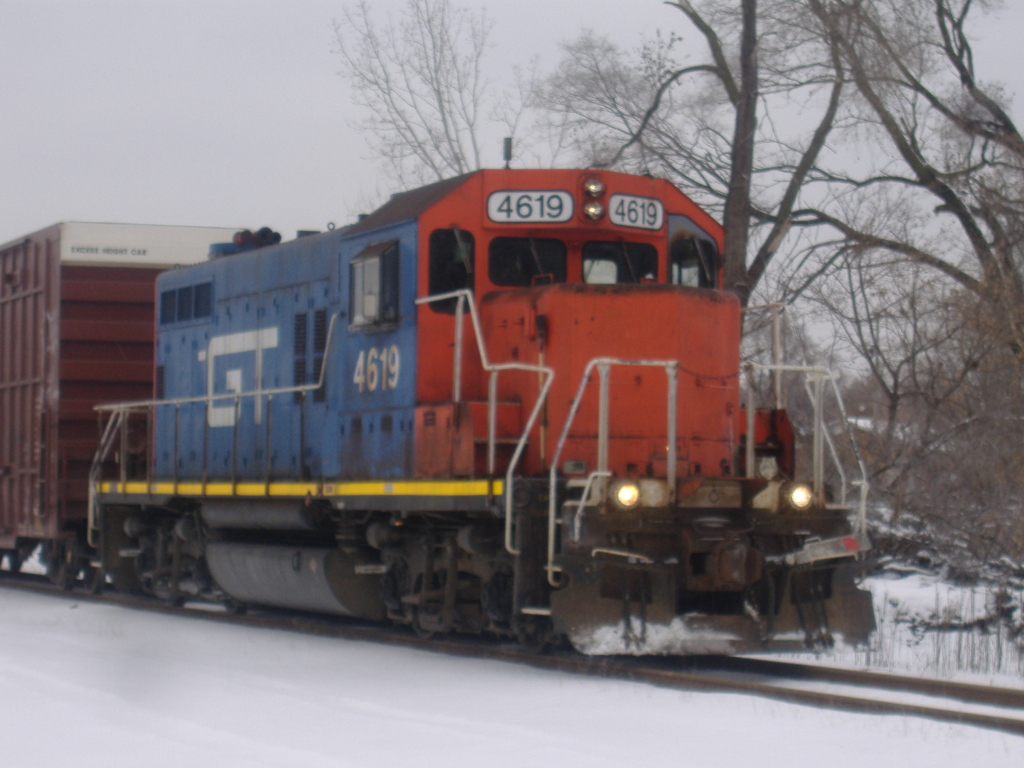
GTW 4619 heading south from Kalamazoo near Battle Creek is one of the GP9s the railroad rebuilt and designated a GP9R

The first diesel locomotive to operate in regular service in Michigan arrived in 1938. It was GTW 7800, an EMC SC switching locomotive to work in Detroit. Previously, in 1925, GTW acquired from EMC an early motorized gasoline-electric railcar known as a Doodlebug. The cars were self-propelled units resembling a passenger car, with a baggage compartment and a coach section for passengers that GTW used on its Detroit to Port Huron and Richmond to Jackson routes until 1953. GTW also had another gasoline-electric locomotive referred to as a box-cab, built by Brill in 1926. Originally built for the Long Island Rail Road, GTW purchased it in 1934 and numbered it 7730. It was relegated to loading and unloading freight cars from GTW ferries in Milwaukee, Wisconsin. The unit was eventually converted to diesel power in 1939 and served in Milwaukee until 1960.

GTW continued to dieselize its locomotive fleet in the 1940s and 1950s, primarily with models from EMD, which was owned by one of GTW's largest freight customers, General Motors. The exceptions were approximately 40 Alco S-2 and S-4 switching locomotives. Other diesel locomotives from EMD included several NW2s, SW900s and SW1200s, purchased for switching duties in rail yards and on branch lines. Grand Trunk Western's first mainline road diesel locomotives were almost two dozen EMD F3As, acquired in 1948. They were followed in the 1950s by EMD GP9s and GP18s for freight and passenger service. The GP9s were rebuilt by GTW's Battle Creek locomotive shops into GP9Rs, with improved internal components and modern low-nose cabs.

==== Second-generation diesel locomotives ====
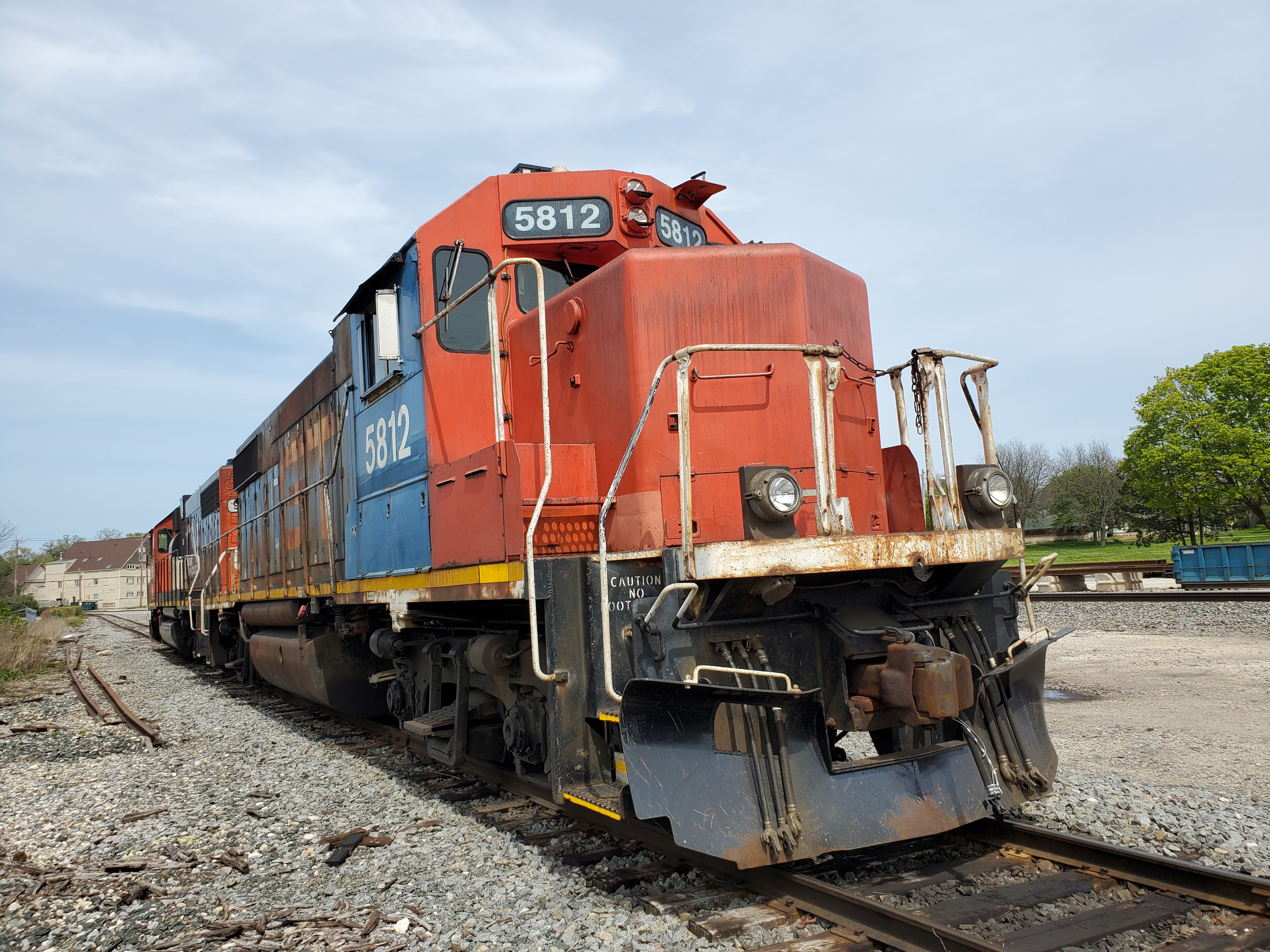
GTW 5812, an EMD GP38-2, in Waukesha, Wisconsin, on May 16, 2020.

The next new motive power to be acquired was the EMD SD40 in 1969. These were GTW's first six-axle locomotives, and most lasted on GTW for at least four decades. GTW's most-dominant diesel locomotive in its fleet was the 2,000-horsepower (1.5 MW) EMD GP38. The first GP38s were delivered in 1971, and were also the first locomotives to wear GTW's blue, red/orange and white scheme. It proved to be a versatile locomotive for GTW, used in switching and mainline service. The GP38AC was the first version to be purchased by GTW which had an alternating current alternator instead of the typical direct current generator. This was followed by the acquisition of several GP38-2s into the 1980s. GTW also purchased its new locomotives without dynamic brakes since the company did not have any significant grades on its routes. GTW also inherited several locomotives, including its first 3,000-horsepower (2.2 MW) GP40-2s, from its acquisition of the Detroit, Toledo and Ironton Railroad. It also rostered its first EMD GP7s when it obtained full ownership of the Detroit and Toledo Shore Line Railroad, in 1981. GTW management found it cost-effective to lease or purchase second-hand diesel locomotives. It purchased several former Rock Island GP38-2s after that railroad closed in 1980. Union Pacific sold GTW several surplus former Missouri Pacific SD40-2s after it had acquired that railroad. It was also common for GTW and CN to share steam and diesel locomotives when either of them needed extra motive power. GTW also sent diesel locomotives for use to its fellow GTC subsidiary railways Central Vermont and Duluth, Winnipeg and Pacific. As of 2012, many GTW GP38s still wore their original blue, red/orange and white paint scheme and were found operating throughout CN's other US subsidiaries. However, since 1991, CN gradually retired, sold or applied its own paint scheme to GTW locomotives. As of December 2020, the last GTW-painted SD40-2, 5936, was still operated by CN.

In November 2020, as part of celebrations for the 25th anniversary of CN's privatization, the company unveiled a series of locomotives repainted in the schemes of its predecessor and subsidiary railroads. EMD SD70M-2 No. 8952 was repainted in the blue and red livery of GTW, along with the logos of that company.

== Facilities ==
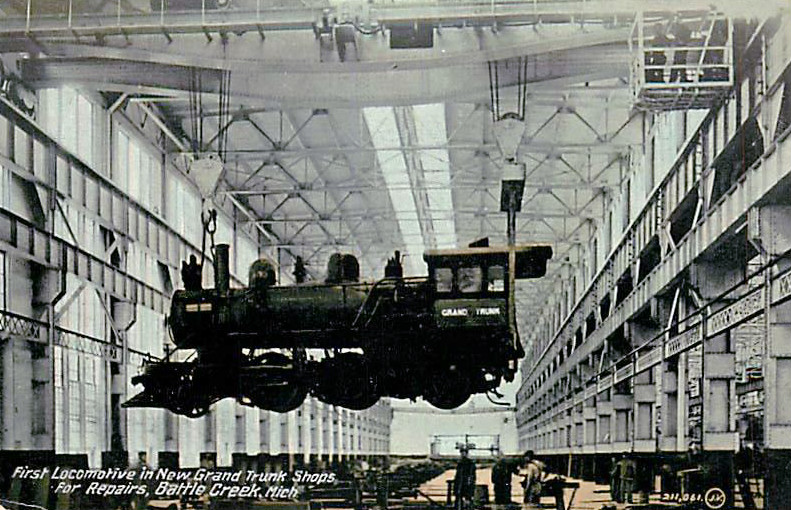
The first locomotive in Grand Trunk Western's Battle Creek locomotive shops. c. 1908

Over its history, Grand Trunk Western has had rail yards and engine terminals located in Detroit, Battle Creek, Durand, Flat Rock, Flint, Grand Rapids, Pontiac, Port Huron, Blue Island, Illinois and Chicago. In each of these cities, GTW had engine terminals and facilities for locomotive maintenance, including roundhouses and turntables. Prior to 1900, the railroad constructed its major locomotive repair shops in Battle Creek, while railcar repair and maintenance was handled by GTW's Port Huron car shops. The Battle Creek Shops were upgraded and modernized in 1907. The original Port Huron car shops were destroyed by fire in 1913 and rebuilt on a new 55-acre site at Griswold Road and 32nd Street. Its major freight yards were Durand Yard and Pontiac Yard, located in the two Michigan cities that were major GTW junction points. There is also Nichols Yard in Battle Creek, Tunnel Yard in Port Huron, Torrey Yard near Flint and East Yard near the Milwaukee Junction area in the Detroit enclave of Hamtramck. City Yard was the railroad's rail yard on the Detroit riverfront adjacent to Brush Street Station and its ferry slip dock. The yard, dock and station were eventually all removed and redeveloped by 1975 for construction of the Renaissance Center. It also obtained the former Penn Central Winona Yard in Bay City when it acquired that trackage from Conrail, in 1976.

On Chicago's southwest side, GTW's Elsdon Yard served as its primary yard and locomotive facility there since the railroad laid tracks into the city in the 1880s. GTW also had a smaller transfer yard south of Chicago near rail junction Blue Island, Illinois. In 1975, GTW opened an intermodal freight terminal yard in Chicago known as Railport. The facility is in Chicago's Back of the Yards neighborhood and was formerly the Pennsylvania Railroad's Levitt Street Yard. GTW also increased intermodal operations in Detroit In 1976, when it expanded its Ferndale, Michigan railyard into an intermodal facility it called GT MoTerm. The Elsdon Yard was closed and abandoned by 1990 and has been redeveloped. Detroit, Toledo and Ironton's former hump classification yard in Flat Rock, which GTW acquired from its 1983 merger with DT&I. It still serves as an important freight hub for Canadian National. Several interlocking and crossing gate towers were also maintained by GTW through its history.

== Passenger trains ==
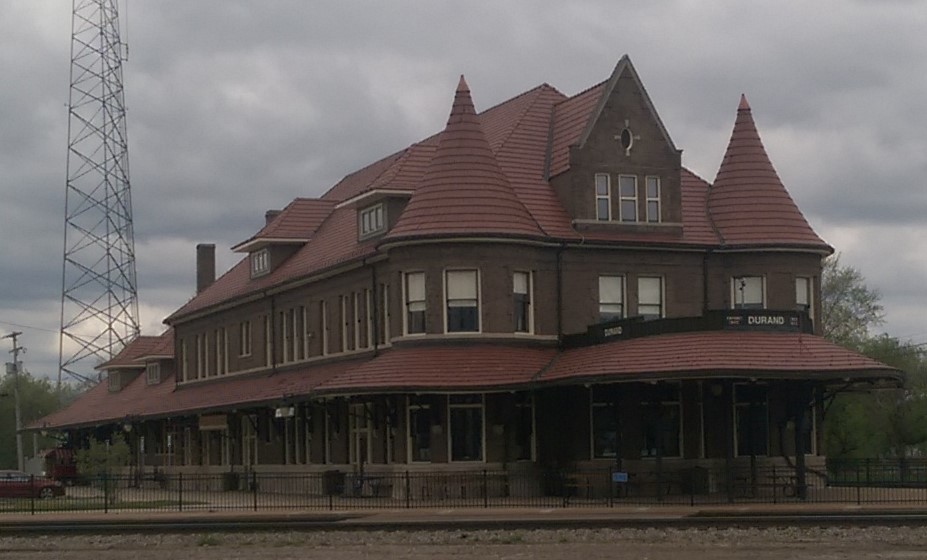
Durand Union Station in Durand, Michigan, a former major GTW hub.

Grand Trunk Western's primary passenger trains were the Maple Leaf, the International Limited, the Inter-City Limited and The LaSalle, which provided service between Chicago's Dearborn Station and Toronto Union Station. In 1967, GTW introduced The Mohawk as a fast through train between Chicago and Brush Street Station in Detroit. Passenger operations were handed-over to Amtrak (National Railroad Passenger Corporation) on May 1, 1971. Amtrak's Chicago to Port Huron trains, known as its Blue Water Service, operate over GTW's route between Battle Creek and Port Huron.

The railroad also operated suburban commuter trains between downtown Detroit and Pontiac, Michigan, from August 1931 until January 1974, when the now-defunct Southeast Michigan Transportation Authority (SEMTA) took over operating the commuter trains. Amtrak's Detroit–Chicago trains now originate or terminate over this former commuter line, making stops in the northern Detroit suburbs of Pontiac, Troy and Royal Oak, Michigan. Part of GTW's former route in Detroit, to Brush Street Station and its railcar ferry dock known as the Dequindre Cut, has been transformed into an urban greenway rail trail.

== Car ferries ==
=== Lake Michigan ===
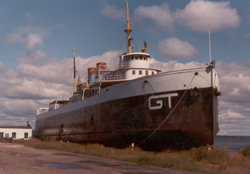
The carferry steamship Grand Rapids at Muskegon, Michigan in 1980

Grand Trunk Western was one of three Michigan railroads, along with the Ann Arbor Railroad and Pere Marquette Railway, that operated separate railcar ferry service across Lake Michigan between Michigan and Wisconsin. Loading rail cars onto ships that had rails mounted to their decks, and ferrying the cars east and west across Lake Michigan, allowed railroads to bypass the congested rail interchanges in Chicago and move time-sensitive freight more quickly.

GTW's ferry service was originally operated by the former Detroit, Grand Haven and Milwaukee Railway (DGH&M), which Grand Trunk Railway acquired in 1882. DGH&M initially had agreements with ferry companies operating on Lake Michigan to transfer its passengers and freight onto ships bound for Milwaukee from Grand Haven, Michigan. GTW's rail car ferry service began in 1902 with an operating agreement with the steamship company, Crosby Transportation Company. The railway constructed ferry slip docks at Grand Haven and Milwaukee and had two steamships built, the SS Grand Haven and SS Milwaukee, capable of carrying 26 freight railcars. In 1905, Grand Trunk assumed Crosby's interest and incorporated the Grand Trunk Milwaukee Car Ferry Company to operate the ships. In Milwaukee, GTW interchanged rail cars with the Milwaukee Road, Chicago and North Western and the Soo Line. The ownership of the ferry company was shared with the Pennsylvania Railroad (PRR) from 1927 until 1954, and sailed as the Grand Trunk-Pennsylvania Route. The SS Milwaukee sank, loaded with rail cars, in a storm after departing Milwaukee in October, 1929, with everyone aboard lost. Three new ships, the Grand Rapids, Madison and the City of Milwaukee, constructed between 1926 and 1931, replaced the Grand Haven and Milwaukee. The ships required a crew of 34 and, with strengthened ice-breaking hulls, operated year-round. At PRR's request, GTW moved its Michigan docks to Muskegon, Michigan, in 1937, where its subsidiary, the Muskegon Railway and Navigation Company, initially operated ferry loading and switching operations. GTW had also changed its route into Muskegon, with trackage rights over PRR's line from Grand Rapids.

By 1968, GTW was shipping over 800,000 short tons (710,000 long tons; 730,000 t) of freight a year across Lake Michigan. However, the ferry service began running deficits of over $1 million annually in the 1970s and, in 1975, GTW petitioned the ICC to end the service. Permission was eventually granted, and the last ferry sailed on October 31, 1978.

=== River ferries ===
==== St. Clair River ====
The first river ferry service began in 1860, when the Grand Trunk Railway's tracks reached Sarnia, Ontario, and it had to transfer its passengers and freight across the St. Clair River to Port Huron, and onto the Chicago, Detroit and Canada Grand Trunk Junction Railroad to Detroit or its Chicago and Grand Trunk Railway route to Chicago. GTR started its St. Clair River ferry service with a type of swing ferry-barge. The barge was anchored by 1,000 feet (300 m) of chain. When the barge was loaded, it was released into the current to dock on the opposite side of the river. When this proved unreliable, Grand Trunk replaced it with the wood-burning steamer International II in 1872. It soon was joined in service by the steamer Huron. The ferries continued until 1891, when Grand Trunk completed its rail tunnel connecting Sarnia and Port Huron under the river. However, GTW and CN reinstated the ferry service 80 years later, in 1971, with its Rail-Barge service to accommodate the larger freight railcars that were higher than the 1891 tunnel's height clearance. The St. Clair river barges discontinued service again in 1995, after the new, larger St Clair Tunnel was completed.

==== Detroit River ====
Grand Trunk's river ferry service on the Detroit River connecting Detroit and Windsor, Ontario was also inherited from its 1882 purchase of the Great Western Railway. Great Western's ferry service began after its rails reached Windsor in 1853. Because Great Western's track gauge of 5 ft 6 in (1,676 mm) was different from the standard American gauge of 4 ft 8 1/2 in (1,435 mm), it had to transfer its cargo off railcars and onto the ships. By the 1860s, Great Western made its railway dual gauge by adding a third rail to its tracks to accommodate rail cars of both gauges. Its first side-wheel steam ferry, the Great Western, arrived in 1866, and when first launched was the largest steel vessel on the Great Lakes. The Wabash Railroad contracted with Grand Trunk in 1897 to use its ferry service to connect Wabash's own route from Detroit through Southwest Ontario to Buffalo, New York. Wabash started its own service after 1910, when it acquired Michigan Central's ferries after that railroad opened the Detroit River Tunnel. Eventually, GTW's parent CN took over sole responsibility for ferry operations on the Detroit and St. Clair rivers. The Detroit River ferry operation ceased running in 1975, when GTW was granted trackage rights to use Penn Central's Detroit River Tunnel to connect with CN in Windsor. The start of construction of the Renaissance Center in Detroit in 1973 necessitated the removal of GTW's Detroit ferry-slip docks. During the more than 130 years of rail car ferry operations on the Detroit and St. Clair rivers, all the major railroads, including Michigan Central, Pere Marquette, Wabash and Canadian Pacific, had ferry operations on the Detroit River. The GTW/CN rail car ferry service was the last to operate in the Great Lakes when it ended operations on the St Clair River in 1995.

== Gallery ==
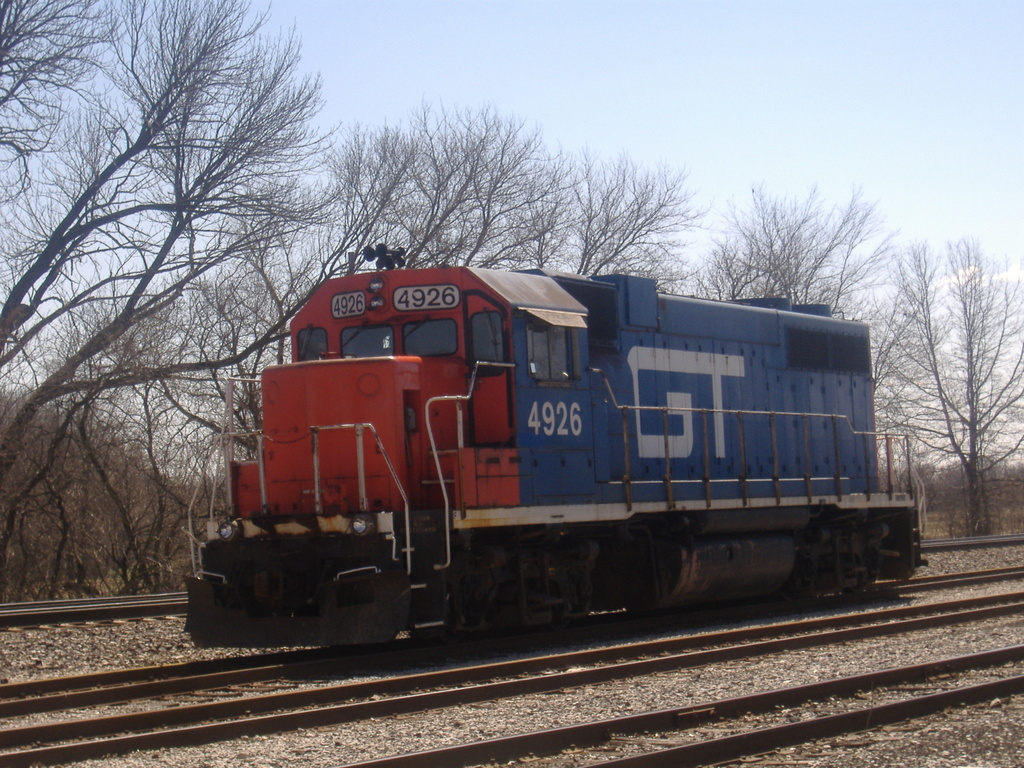
Grand Trunk Western GP38-2 Locomotive 4926 idles at a siding in Pavilion, Michigan on April 14, 2008.

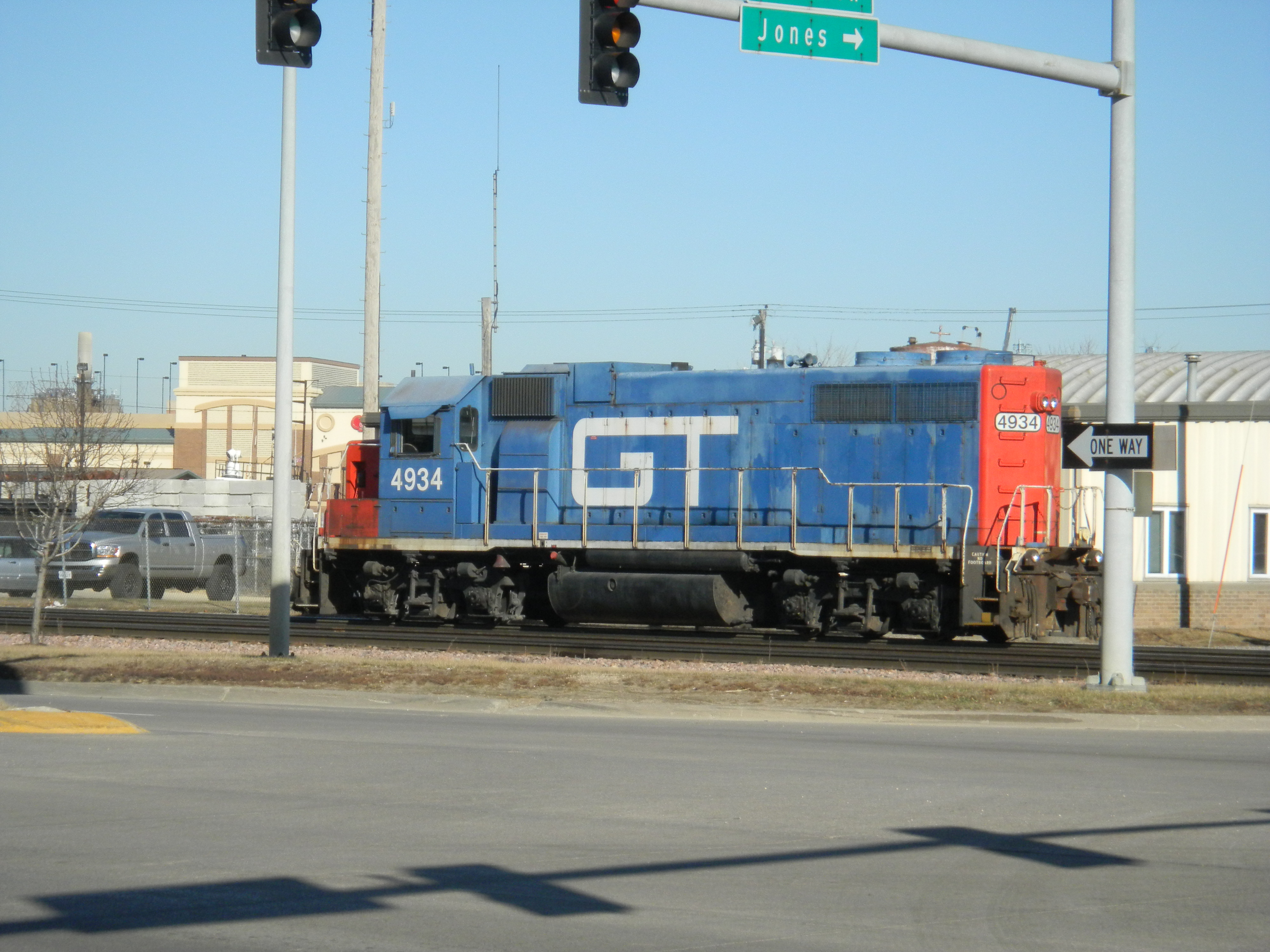
GP38 #4934 in Iowa.

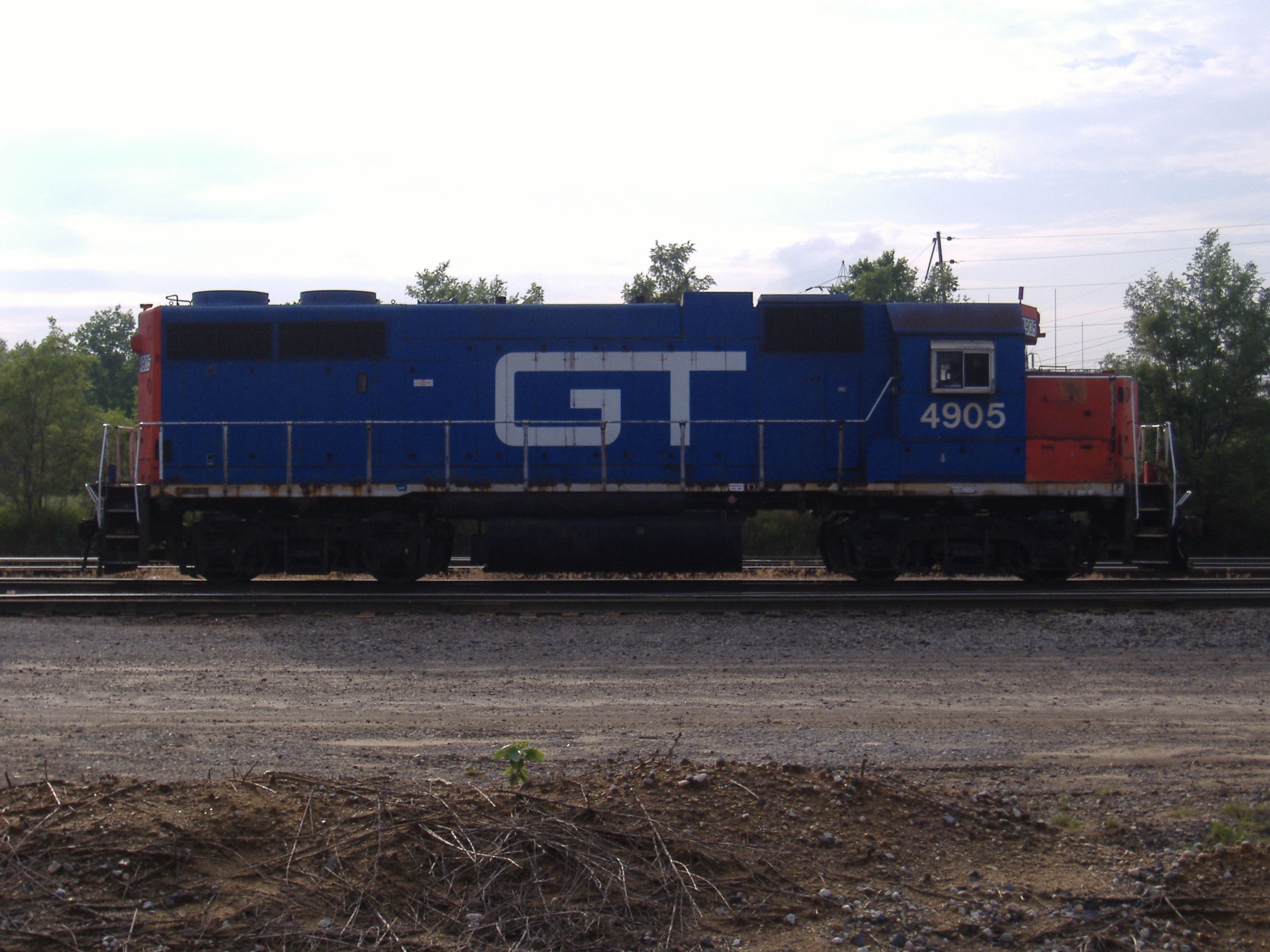
This GP38-2, GTW 4905 is sitting idle in Battle Creek, Michigan on July 7, 2008.

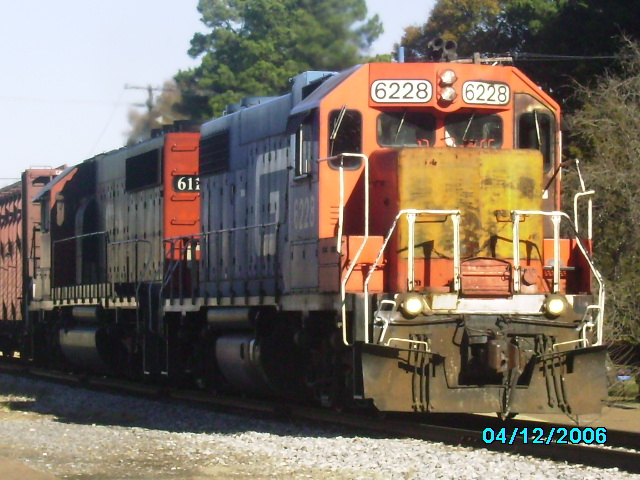
GTW 6228, a GP38-2 at Senatobia, Mississippi on December 4, 2006, would just after this receive new paint in the CN colors.

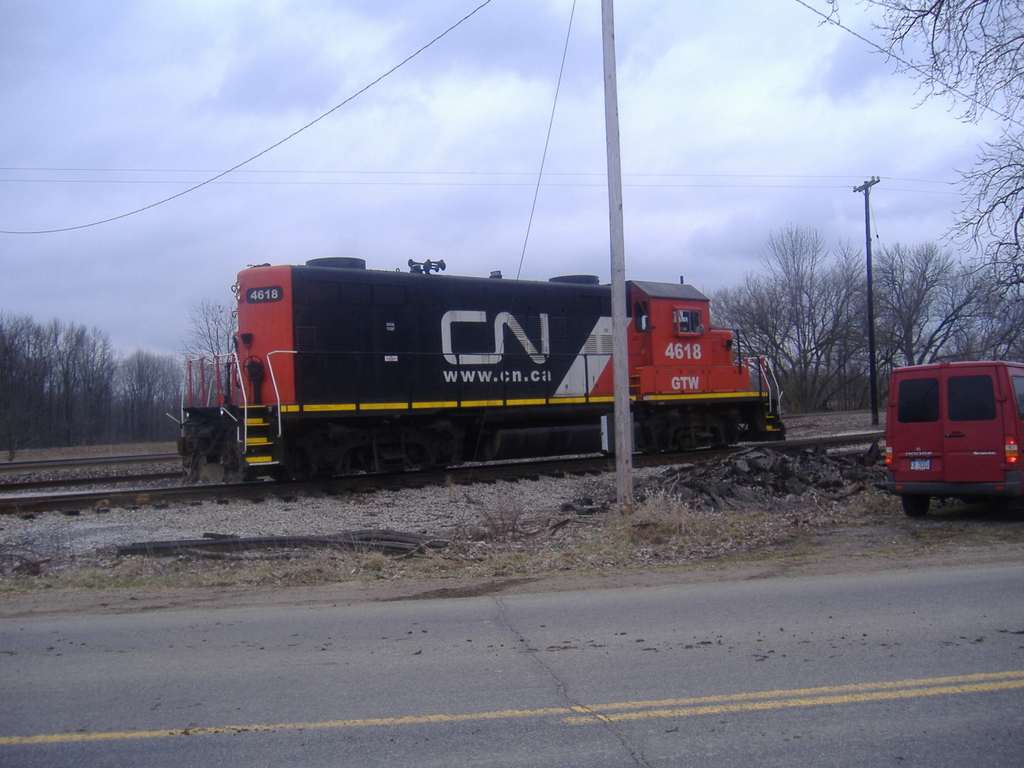
A GTW GP9R in the Canadian National color scheme.

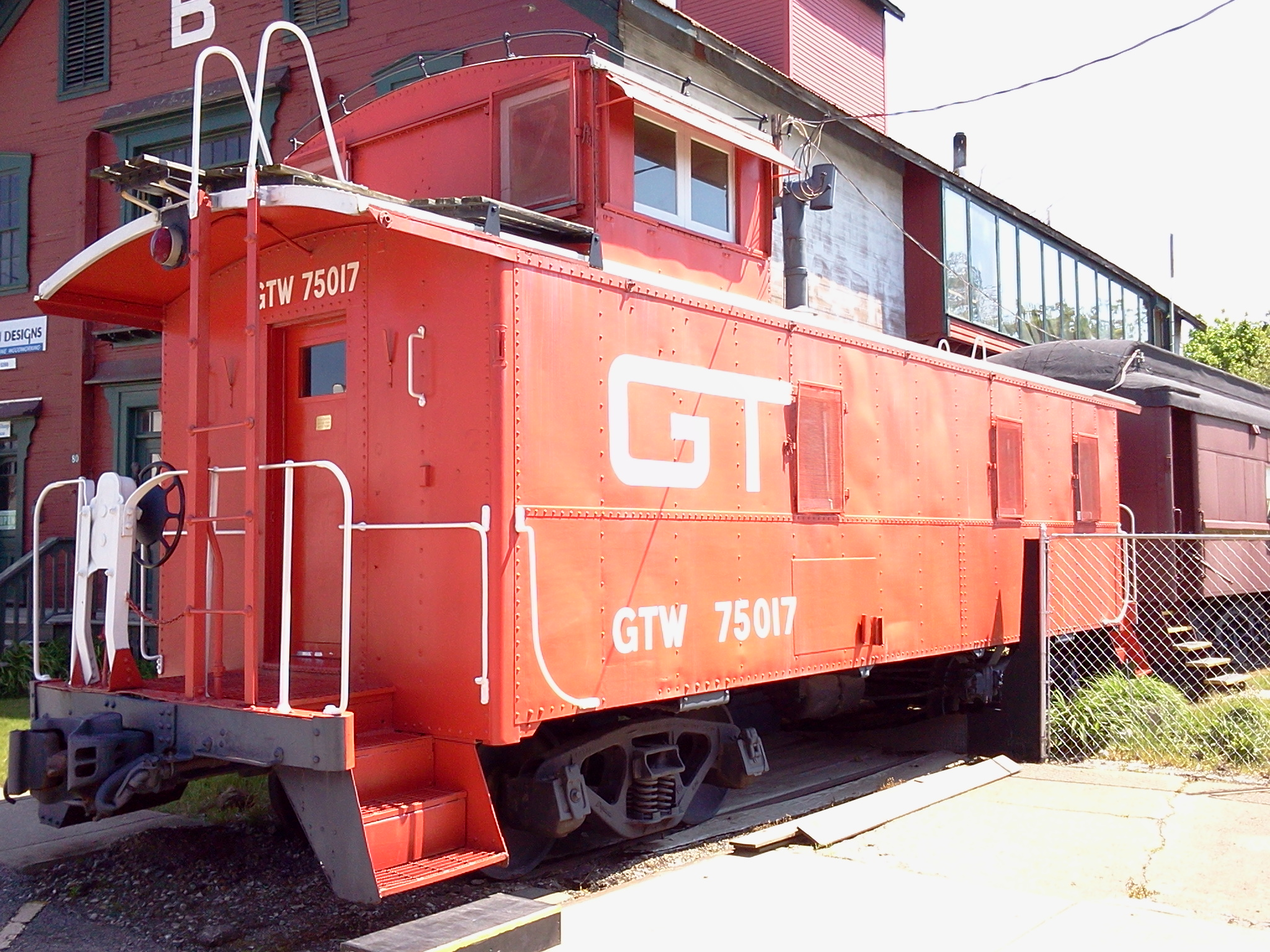
GTW Caboose 75017 on display in Imlay City, Michigan.

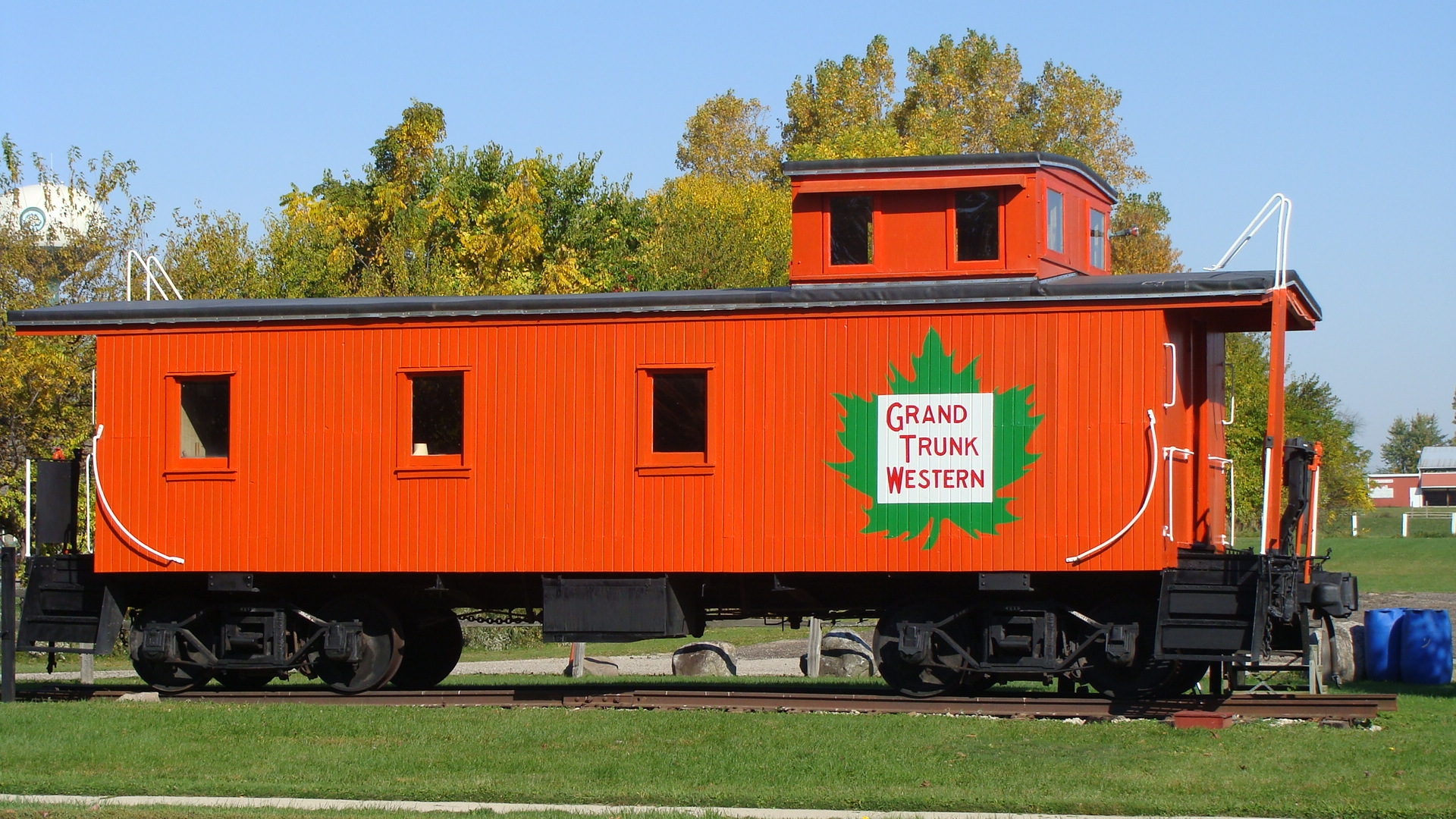
A restored GTW wood caboose on display at Lake Odessa, Michigan

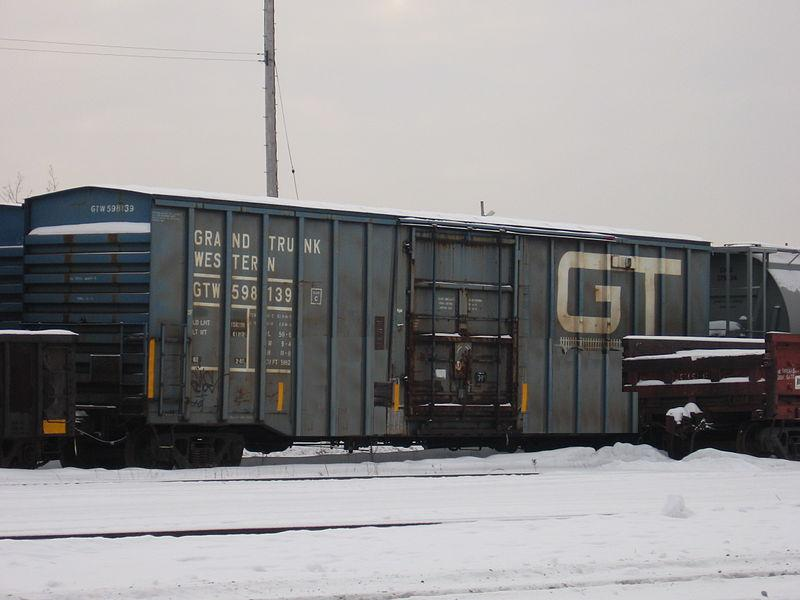
GTW boxcar at Maréchal Joffre carload centre in Charny, Quebec. date taken January 26, 2011

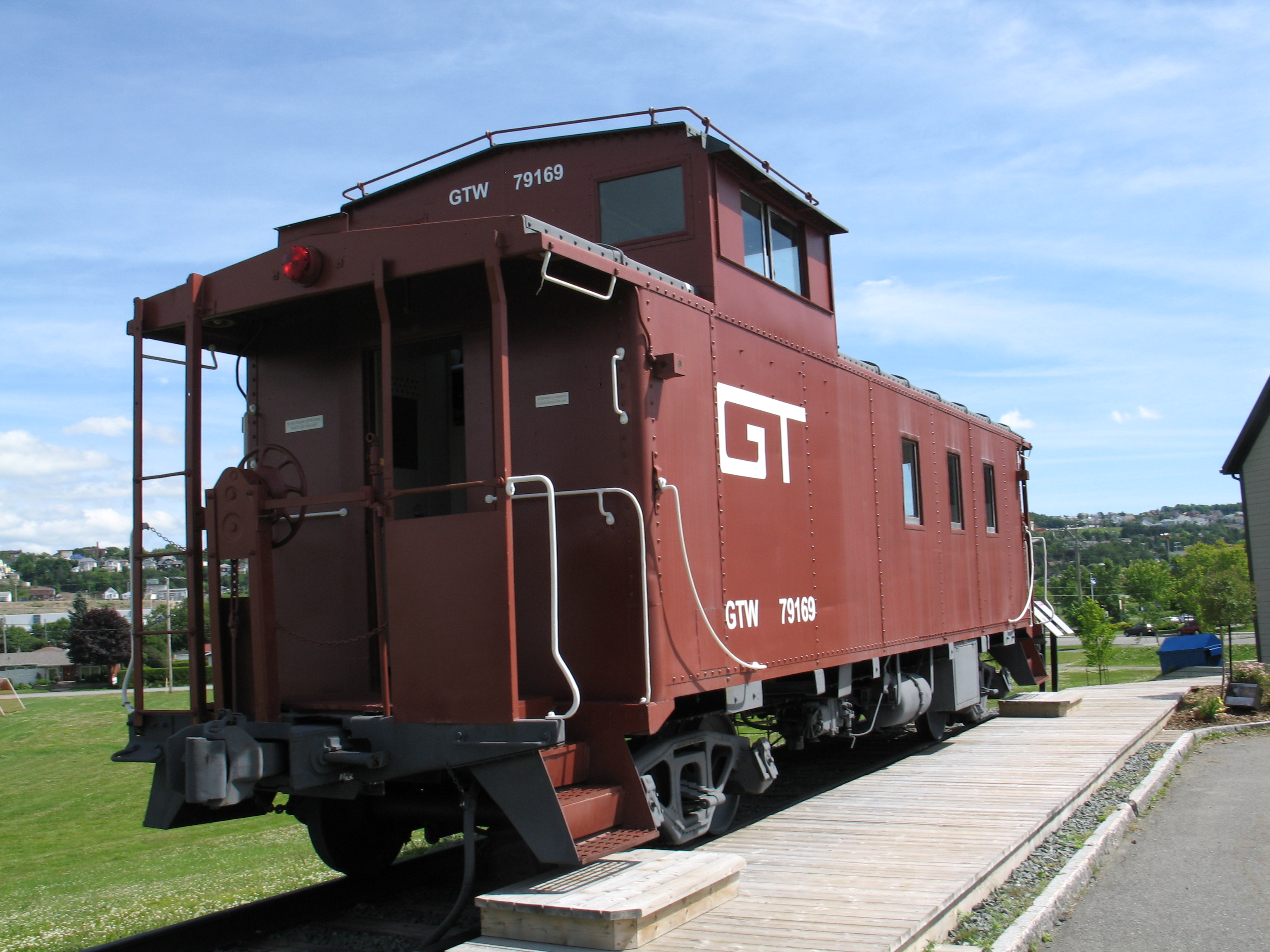
A GTW caboose, on permanent display at a tourist information center in Rivière-du-Loup, Quebec.

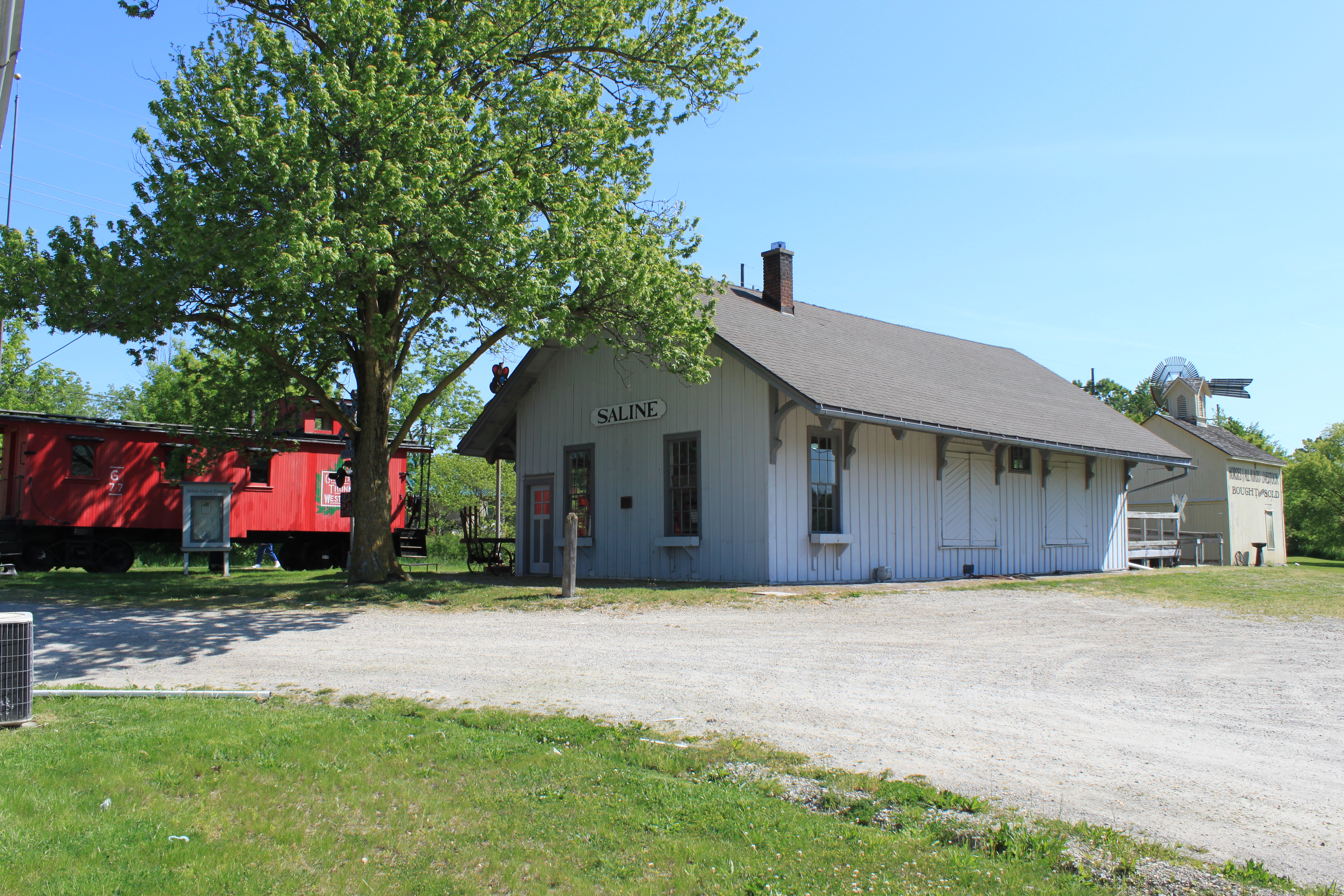
The former GTW depot at Saline, Michigan with a restored GTW wood caboose.

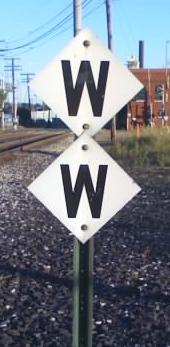
The whistle post sign style of GTW on a double whistle post at Battle Creek, Michigan

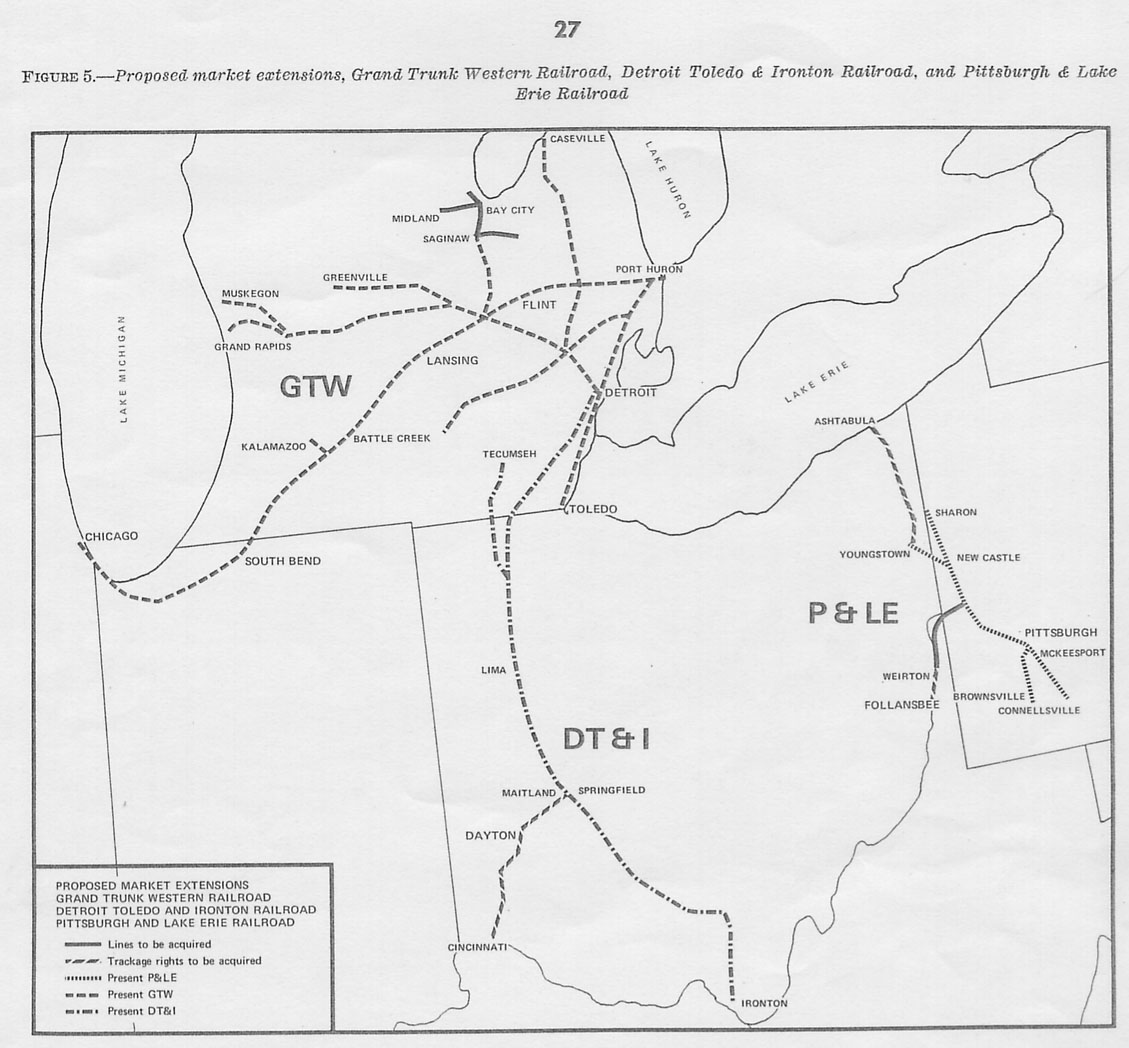
A 1976 map of the proposed routes to be turned over by Conrail on the GTW, DT&I and P&LE.
