= Grand Rapids Airport =

Grand Rapids Airport may refer to:

- Gerald R. Ford International Airport (IATA: GRR) near Grand Rapids, Michigan, US
- Grand Rapids–Itasca County Airport (IATA: GPZ) near Grand Rapids, Minnesota, US
- Grand Rapids Aerodrome (TC LID: CJV8) near Grand Rapids, Manitoba, Canada

== See also ==
- Grand Rapids Air Force Station, Grand Rapids, Minnesota, US
- Grand Rapids (disambiguation)
