= Grand Rapids Township =

Grand Rapids Township may refer to:

- Grand Rapids Township, LaSalle County, Illinois
- Grand Rapids Charter Township, Michigan
- Grand Rapids Township, Itasca County, Minnesota
- Grand Rapids Township, LaMoure County, North Dakota, a township in LaMoure County
- Grand Rapids Township, Wood County, Ohio
