= Grand Rapids, North Dakota =

Unincorporated community in North Dakota, U.S.

Coordinates: 46°26′40″N 98°22′14″W

Grand Rapids is an unincorporated community in LaMoure County, in the U.S. state of North Dakota.

== History ==
A post office called Grand Rapids was established in 1880, and remained in operation until 1966. The community took its name from the rapids in the James River.
