= Grand Rapids Terminal Railroad =

Former terminal railroad

Overview
- Locale: Michigan
- Dates of operation: about 1906–1928
- Successor: Grand Trunk Western

Technical
- Track gauge: 4 ft 8 1/2 in (1,435 mm) standard gauge

The Grand Rapids Terminal Railroad was a terminal railroad in Grand Rapids, Michigan. Established about 1906, it was absorbed by the Grand Trunk Western Railroad in 1928.
