= USS Grand Rapids (PF-31) =

Tacoma-class patrol frigate of the United States Navy

History

United States
- Name: Grand Rapids
- Namesake: City of Grand Rapids, Michigan
- Builder: Walter Butler Shipbuilders Inc., Superior, Wisconsin
- Laid down: 30 July 1943
- Launched: 10 September 1943
- Commissioned: 10 October 1944
- Decommissioned: 10 April 1946
- Fate: Sold for scrapping, 14 April 1947

General characteristics
- Class & type: Tacoma-class frigate
- Displacement: 1,430 long tons (1,453 t) light; 2,415 long tons (2,454 t) full
- Length: 303 ft 11 in (92.63 m)
- Beam: 37 ft 11 in (11.56 m)
- Draft: 13 ft 8 in (4.17 m)
- Propulsion: 2 × 5,500 shp (4,101 kW) turbines; 3 boilers; 2 shafts
- Speed: 20 knots (37 km/h; 23 mph)
- Complement: 190
- Armament: 3 × 3"/50 dual purpose guns (3x1); 4 x 40 mm guns (2×2); 9 × 20 mm guns (9×1); 1 × Hedgehog anti-submarine mortar; 8 × Y-gun depth charge projectors; 2 × Depth charge tracks

USS Grand Rapids (PF-31), a Tacoma-class frigate, was the first ship of the United States Navy to be named for Grand Rapids, Michigan.

== Construction ==
Grand Rapids (PF-31), formerly designated PG-139, was launched at Walter Butler Shipbuilders, Inc., in Superior, Wisconsin, on 10 September 1943, sponsored by Mrs. Ted Booth; and commissioned on 10 October 1944. The ship had been taken down the Mississippi River and outfitted at Plaquemine, Louisiana, before being commissioned at New Orleans.

== Service history ==
Outfitted as a weather ship, Grand Rapids sailed on 17 October for Bermuda and her shakedown cruise, but was damaged at sea by a hurricane and returned to Algiers, Louisiana, for repairs. After repairs were completed, she proceeded toward Bermuda again on 27 October, and after her shakedown training put in at Boston, Massachusetts, on 4 December 1944. Grand Rapids steamed out of Boston on 6 January 1945 for duty as a weather picket ship off Newfoundland.

Grand Rapids operated as a weather ship out of NS Argentia until returning to Boston on 6 June 1945. The ship soon sailed for her station on 7 July, and continued sending vital weather reports for the North Atlantic area until finally returning to Boston on 15 January 1946. Grand Rapids decommissioned at Boston on 10 April 1946, was sold to Sun Shipbuilding & Dry Dock Company, Chester, Pennsylvania, on 14 April 1947, and subsequently scrapped.
