= Château Prince Rupert =

Proposed hotel in Prince Rupert, British Columbia

Coordinates: 54.312766°N 130.327778°W

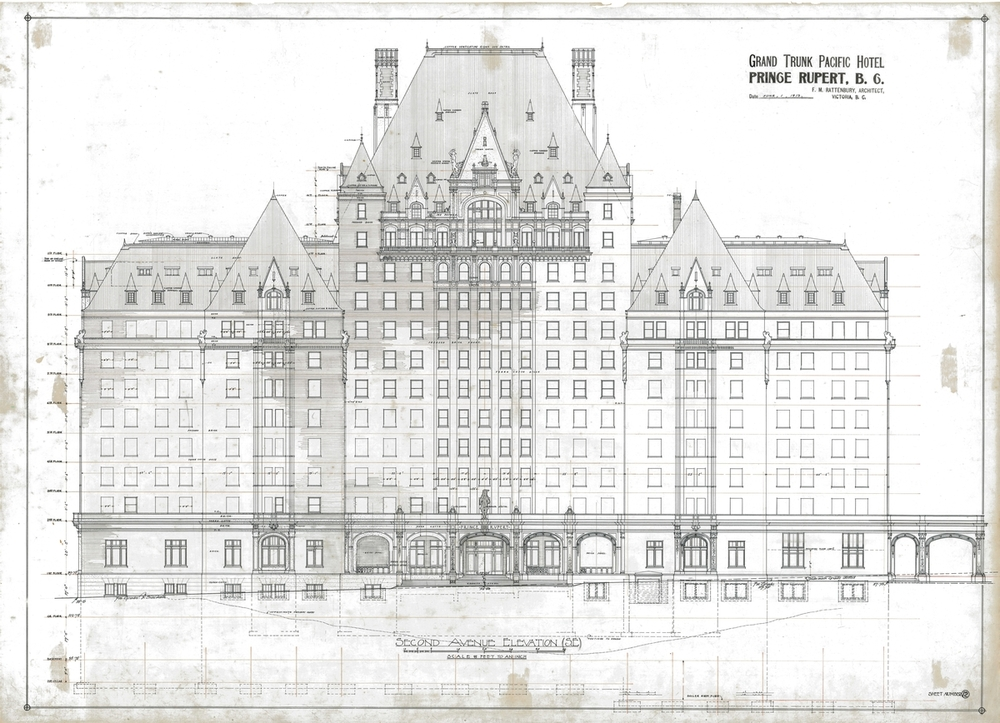

General information
- Status: Unexecuted
- Groundbreaking: November 1913
- Owner: Grand Trunk Pacific Railway

Design and construction
- Architect: Francis Rattenbury

The Château Prince Rupert was an unexecuted hotel to be built in Prince Rupert, British Columbia. The hotel was planned by the Grand Trunk Pacific Railway and was designed by Francis Rattenbury. The architect's first sketches were made in September 1911, and he completed the final plans in June 1913. Work on the foundations began in late 1913, but halted shortly thereafter and never resumed.

The hotel project was part of the Grand Trunk Pacific's plan to make Prince Rupert a west coast port city to rival Vancouver, Seattle, Portland, and San Francisco. If built, the structure would have been the focal point of the town and one of the largest hotels in the country. However, the railway's financial problems, combined with the onset of World War I, prevented its realisation. By 1923 the GTP had been absorbed into the new Canadian National Railway, which chose Vancouver as its western terminus.

== History ==
The Grand Trunk Pacific Railway had chosen Prince Rupert in 1904 to be its western terminus. President Charles Melville Hays intended Prince Rupert to become the "metropolis of the north." The company contracted landscape architects Brett, Hall & Co. of Boston to plan the town.

At the company's annual meeting in 1911, president Charles Melville Hays informed shareholders that the railway "proposed to construct a chain of first-class modern hotels" stretching from Winnipeg to Prince Rupert.

In July 1913, Rattenbury's designs for the Château Prince Rupert, Château Mount Robson, and Château Miette received an extensive profile in the Contract Record and Engineering Review. Rattenbury submitted to the journal a watercolour rendering of each building. Curiously, the image Rattenbury submitted and the building the article describes was the first iteration of the design, which had been superseded in September 1912. In November 1913, the Canadian Railway and Marine World reported that excavations for the hotel had begun recently.

== Drawings ==
In the summer of 1985, a set of 283 drawings of the hotel was found in the attic of Glenlyon School in Victoria by headmaster Keith Walker. Part of the school buildings comprised Rattenbury's former house, "Iechinihl." These drawings are now held at the British Columbia Archives in Victoria. A full set of drawing is also held by the Prince Rupert City and Regional Archives as part of the Francis M. Rattenbury fonds.
