= Ker Block =

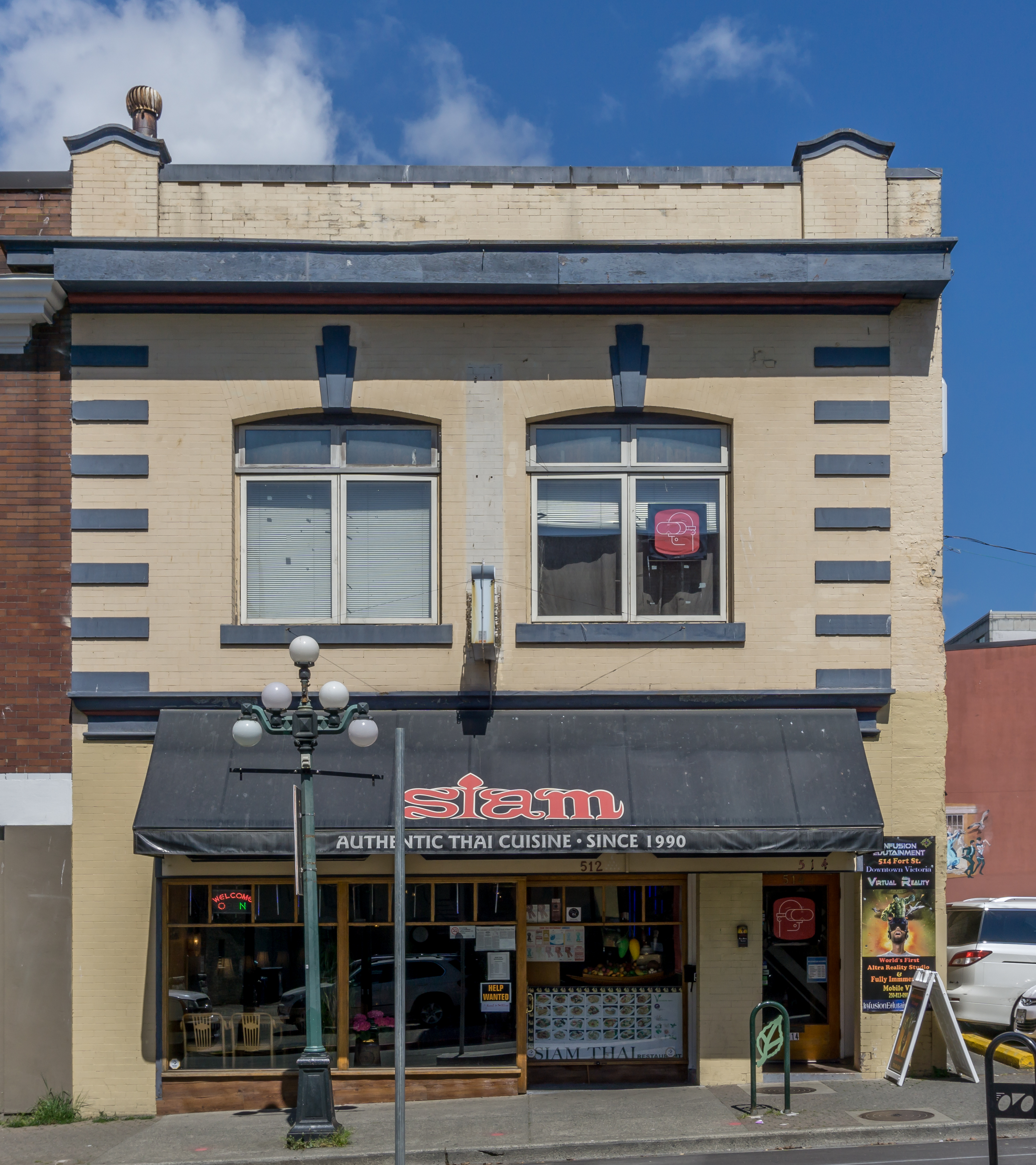
- The building's exterior in 2018
- Interactive map of the Ker Block area

General information
- Location: 512 Fort Street, Victoria, British Columbia, Canada
- Coordinates: 48.4252°N 123.3690°W
- Completed: 1909
- Opened: 1909

Technical details
- Floor count: 2

Design and construction
- Architect: Francis Mawson Rattenbury

Ker Block is an historic building in Victoria, British Columbia, Canada. It is a two-storey brick commercial building built in 1909.

== See also ==
- List of historic places in Victoria, British Columbia
