= Compton Packenham =

British-American journalist (1893–1957)

Founding member of American Council on Japan

Personal details
- Born: 11 May 1893 Kobe, Japan
- Died: 17 August 1957 (aged 64)

Thomas Compton Packenham, MC (11 May 1893 – 17 August 1957) was a British-American journalist. He served as a British Army officer in the First World War, and worked at the American Council on Japan.

== Early life ==
Packenham was born 11 May 1893 in Kobe, Japan. His father was British and managed a shipyard. He spoke fluent Japanese. He had spent his early childhood in Japan. He served in the Coldstream Guards as a lieutenant colonel, was awarded the Military Cross (MC) and mentioned in despatches.

== Career ==
Packenham worked in the New York Times in the 1920s. He was the author of The Rearguard (1930.) He was the Tokyo Correspondent of Newsweek after World War II. In 1946 he was appointed the bureau chief of Newsweek in Japan. He was part of the American Council on Japan. He helped found the council in late June 1948 in Harvard Club in New York City. Upon the recommendation the Emperor of Japan, Packenham helped John Foster Dulles meet Japanese politicians and businessmen. In 1947 he engaged in bitter criticism of Supreme Commander for the Allied Powers.

He along with others of the American Council on Japan taught Nobusuke Kishi English and helped him improve his image. They helped him become Prime Minister of Japan. In Japan during the post-World War II occupation period, he helped Japanese government officials communicate with senior US politicians and officials. The Japanese government was able to circumvent MacArthur's communication blockade. Compton Packenham died 17 August 1957.

== Personal life ==
In 1915, Packenham married Phyllis Price. Their daughter, Simona, was born in 1916; she never met her father. They soon separated as "he had taken no time at all to reveal himself as a most unsatisfactory choice".

In January 1918, Packenham was on leave from the Army in London, and he met and began a relationship with Alma Dolling, a war widow. In October 1918, Packenham wrote a letter to his first wife informing her their marriage was over. Alma was cited in the Packenham's divorce in 1920, and she married him in 1921. However, once again, his marriage failed and Alma left him to return to her native Canada: their marriage formally ended in divorce in 1925.
