= Joseph Hickson =

Sir Joseph Hickson
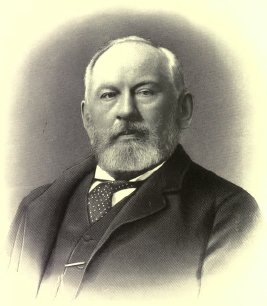
- Born: 23 January 1830; Otterburn, Northumberland, England
- Died: 4 January 1897 (aged 66); Montreal, Quebec
- Known for: railway executive

Sir Joseph Hickson (23 January 1830 – 4 January 1897) was a Canadian railway executive.

Hickson was born in England to parents Thomas Hixon and Ann Brodie, then began his railway career with Newcastle and Berwick Railway, Maryport and Carlisle Railway and Manchester, Sheffield, and Lincolnshire Railway before moving to Canada in 1862. He was Secretary-Treasurer, and afterwards President, of the Grand Trunk Railway Company of Canada. He was knighted by Queen Victoria 20 January 1890. He died January 4, 1897.

== Family ==
He married Catherine Dow, daughter of Andrew Dow at Stralhearn House, Montreal, June 17, 1869. She was involved in charity work, in particular for the prevention of the spread of tuberculosis in Canada. The couple, who lived at 272 Mountain Street, Montreal, had six children, three sons and three daughters. Their eldest son, J. W. A. Hickson, Esquire, Ph.D., was a professor at McGill University.
