= Edson Joseph Chamberlin =

President of the Grand Trunk Railway from 1912 to 1917

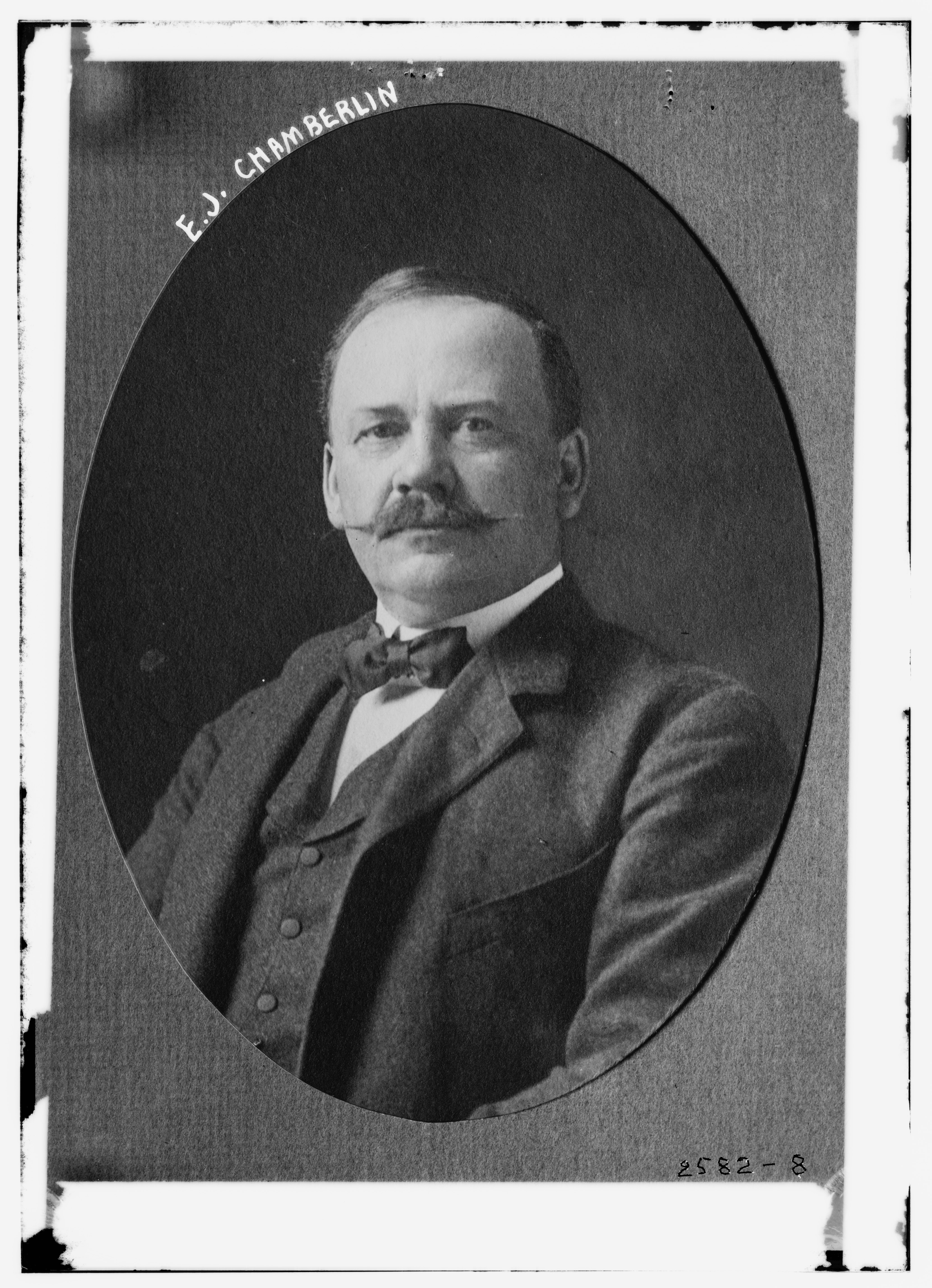

Edson Joseph Chamberlin (August 25, 1852 – August 27, 1924) was the president of the Grand Trunk Railway from 1912 to 1917.

== Biography ==
He was born in Lancaster, New Hampshire, on August 25, 1852. He attended Montpelier Methodist Seminary, and in 1871 started work with the New England Railroad. In 1886, he became the general manager of the Canada Atlantic Railway, and in 1909 he was the general manager and then the vice president of the Grand Trunk Railway. In 1912 he became the president of the Grand Trunk Railway when Charles Melville Hays lost his life on the RMS Titanic. Chamberlin's presidency differed from Hays' in that he led the Grand Trunk to expand westward as part of the Canadian transcontinental railway rather than continuing investment in the Central Vermont Railway and connections with New England.

He remained president until he retired in 1917. Chamberlin was succeeded as president of Grand Trunk Railway by Howard G. Kelley. Chamberlin died at Pasadena, California, on August 27, 1924.

The town of Edson, Alberta, was named in his honour.

Business positions
Preceded by Charles Melville Hays	President of the Grand Trunk Railway; 1912-1917	Succeeded by Howard G. Kelley
