= Howard G. Kelley =

- Born: January 12, 1858; Philadelphia, Pennsylvania
- Died: May 15, 1928 (aged 70); San Diego, California
- Occupations: railroad engineer and executive
- Known for: president of Grand Trunk Pacific Railway

Howard George Kelley (January 12, 1858 – May 15, 1928) was president of Grand Trunk Pacific Railway from 1917 to 1922.

== Biography ==
Kelley was born in Philadelphia on January 12, 1858. He graduated from the Polytechnic College of Pennsylvania then began his railway career with the Northern Pacific Railway in 1881. He served as an assistant engineer at railroad construction sites until 1884 when he was transferred to be a construction and bridge engineer for the railroad's Western and Pacific divisions, but resigned from that position in the same year.

Kelley briefly left railroad work, to work in mining until 1887 when he took a position as resident engineer and superintendent of bridges for St. Louis Southwestern Railway. He worked his way up to earn a promotion to chief engineer in 1890 and consulting engineer on March 1, 1898. Between 1899 and 1907 Kelley also worked as chief engineer for Minneapolis and St. Louis Railway (M&StL). From 1905 to 1907, Kelley also served as president of the American Railway Engineering and Maintenance of Way Association.

On July 4, 1907, Kelley left the M&StL to become chief engineer of Grand Trunk Railway. Kelley was promoted to vice president for construction, operating and maintenance on October 1, 1911, then succeeded Edson Joseph Chamberlin as president of Grand Trunk Pacific Railway on August 28, 1917. Kelley served as a director for the American Railway Association during his term as Grand Trunk president. Kelley resigned from the Grand Trunk Railway in 1922, to be succeeded by W. D. Robb.

Kelley died on May 15, 1928, in San Diego, California; his funeral was held in Denison, Texas, on May 20.

Business positions
Preceded by Hunter McDonald	President of the American Railway Engineering Association; 1905 – 1907	Succeeded by A. W. Johnston
Preceded by Edson Joseph Chamberlin	President of the Grand Trunk Railway; 1917 – 1922	Succeeded by W. D. Robb
