= Grand Trunk Railway =

British-owned railway in Canada and New England

- Map of the Grand Trunk system, including a connection via the NTR

Overview
- Headquarters: Montreal, Quebec
- Reporting mark: GT
- Locale: The Canadian provinces of Ontario, Quebec, Manitoba, Saskatchewan, Alberta, and British Columbia and the U.S. states of Vermont, New Hampshire, Massachusetts, Connecticut, Michigan, Indiana, Maine and Illinois
- Dates of operation: 1852–1923
- Successor: Canadian National Railway

Technical
- Track gauge: 4 ft 8 1/2 in (1,435 mm) standard gauge
- Previous gauge: Built to 5 ft 6 in (1,676 mm) but converted by 1873

The Grand Trunk Railway (reporting mark GT); French: Grand Tronc) was a railway system that operated in the Canadian provinces of Quebec and Ontario and in the American states of Connecticut, Maine, Michigan, Massachusetts, New Hampshire, and Vermont. The railway was operated from headquarters in Montreal, Quebec, with corporate headquarters in London, United Kingdom (4 Warwick House Street). It cost an estimated $160 million to build. The Grand Trunk system and the Canadian Government Railways were precursors of today's Canadian National Railway.

The original charter was for a line running from Montreal to Toronto mostly along the north shore of the St. Lawrence River. It quickly expanded its charter eastward to Portland, Maine, and westward to Sarnia, Ontario. Over time it added many subsidiary lines and branches, including four important subsidiaries:

- Grand Trunk Eastern which operated in Quebec, Vermont, New Hampshire and Maine.
- Central Vermont Railway which operated in Quebec, Vermont, Massachusetts, and Connecticut.
- Grand Trunk Pacific Railway which operated in Northwestern Ontario, Manitoba, Saskatchewan, Alberta, and British Columbia.
- Grand Trunk Western Railroad which operated in Michigan, Indiana, and Illinois.

A fifth subsidiary was the never-completed Southern New England Railway, chartered in 1910, which would have run from a connection with the Central Vermont at Palmer, Massachusetts, to the deep-water, all-weather port of Providence, Rhode Island.

== History ==
=== Charter, construction, and expansion ===
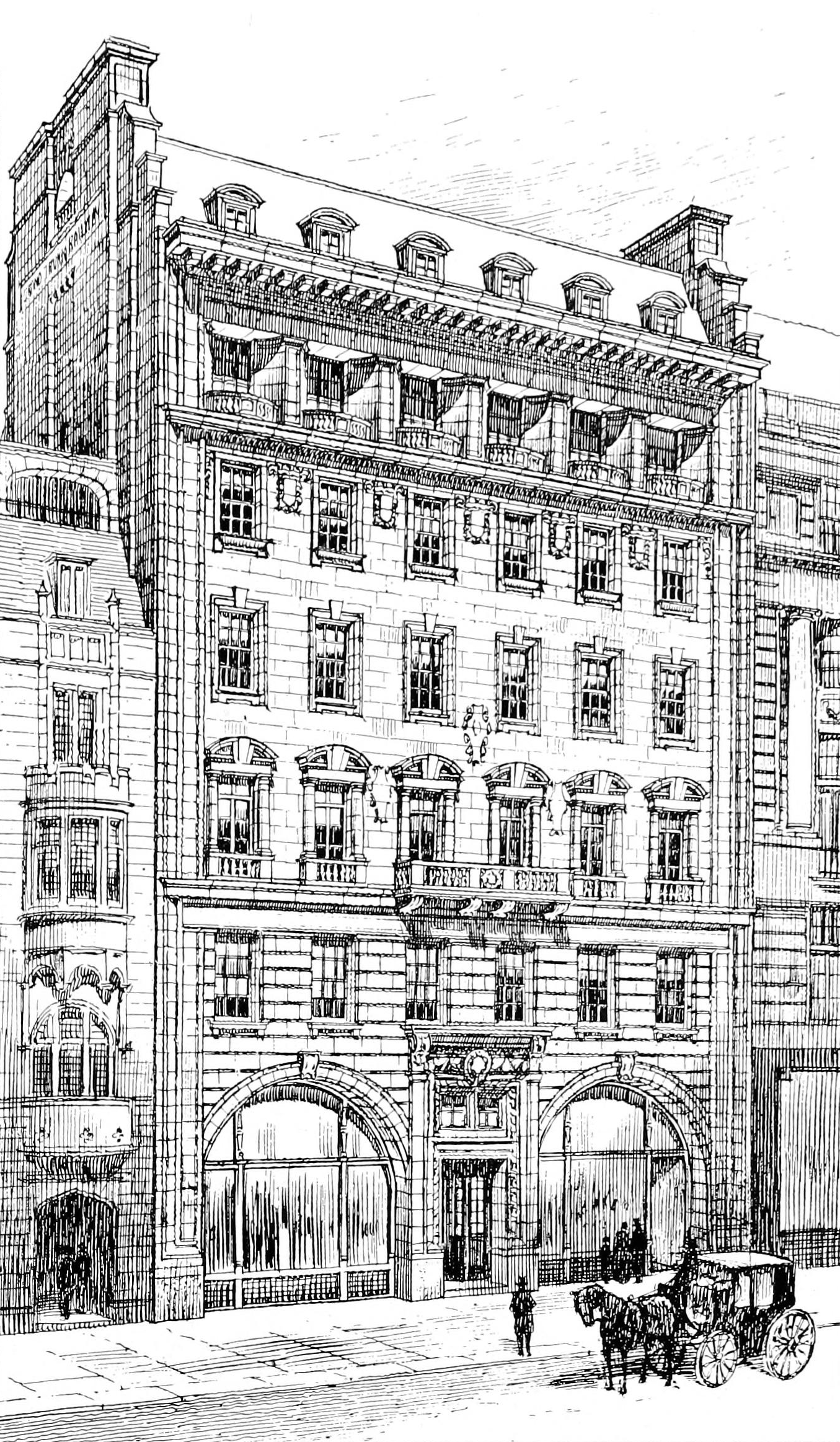
The head office in London at 17-19 Cockspur Street, designed by Sir Aston Webb

The company was incorporated on November 10, 1852, as the Grand Trunk Railway Company of Canada to build a railway line between Montreal and Toronto.

The charter was soon extended east to Portland, Maine and west to Sarnia, Canada West. In 1853 the GTR purchased the St. Lawrence and Atlantic Railroad from Montreal to the Canada East – Vermont border, and the parent company Atlantic and St. Lawrence Railroad through to the harbour facilities at Portland. A line was also built to Lévis, via Richmond from Montreal in 1855, part of the much-talked about "Maritime connection" in British North America. In the same year it purchased the Toronto and Guelph Railroad, whose railway was already under construction. But the Grand Trunk Railway Company changed the original route of the T&G and extended the line to Sarnia, a hub for Chicago-bound traffic. In October of 1856, the section from Montreal to Toronto opened, while the line from Toronto to Sarnia was finished in November of 1859. Also in 1859, a ferry service was established across the St. Clair River to Fort Gratiot (now Port Huron, Michigan).

The Grand Trunk was one of the main factors that pushed British North America towards Confederation. The original colonial economy structured along the water route from the Maritimes up the St. Lawrence River and the lower Great Lakes was greatly expanded by the duplicate route of the Grand Trunk. The explosive growth in trade during the 1850s within the United Province of Canada and further east by water to the Maritimes demanded that a railway link the entire geopolitical region. During this time the GTR extended its line to Lévis further east to Rivière-du-Loup.

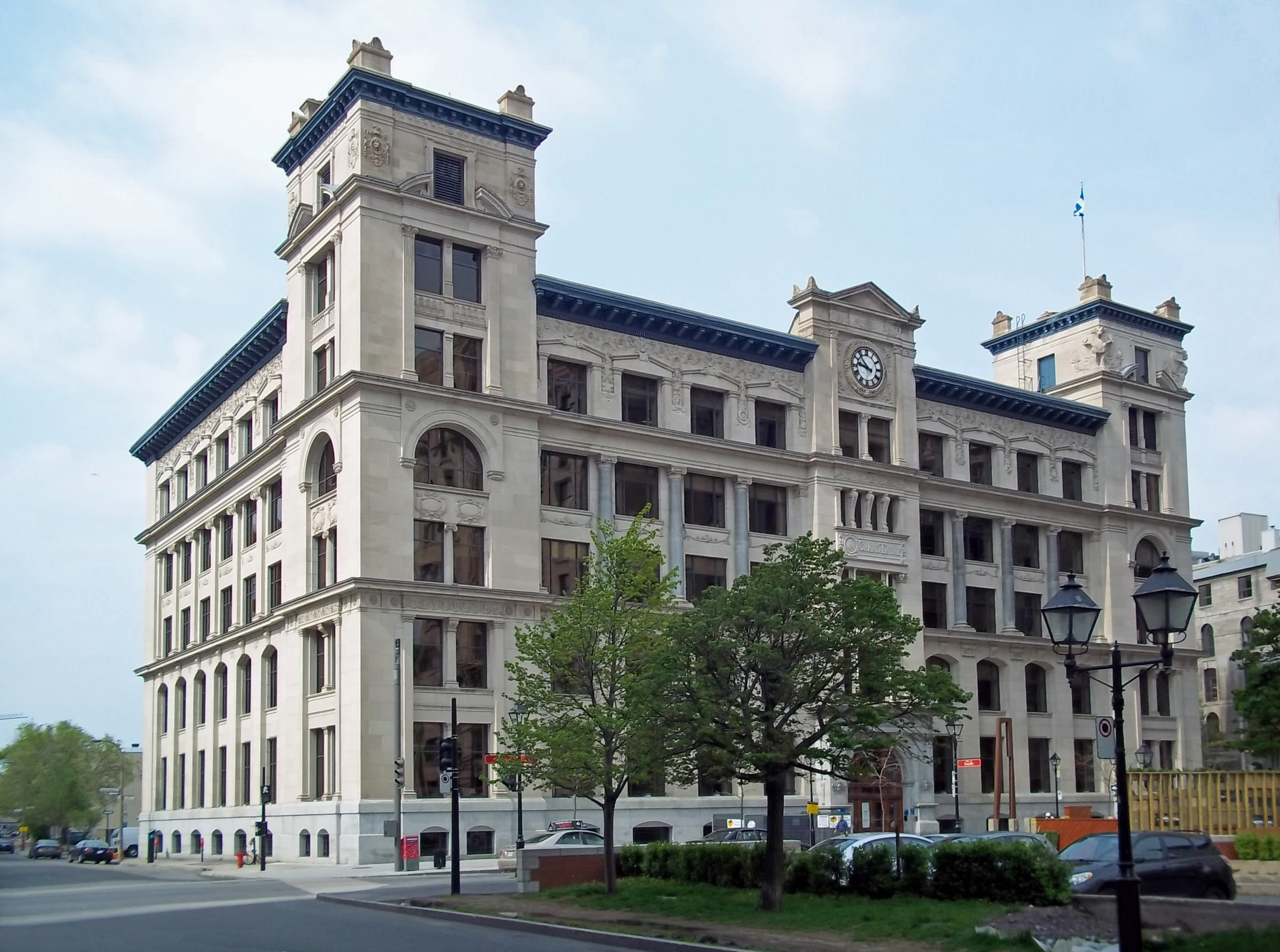
The Canadian headquarters in Montreal, built in 1900

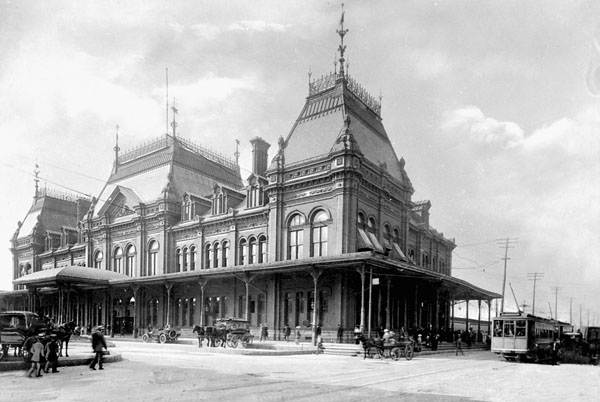
Grand Trunk's Bonaventure Station, Montreal, 1900s

By 1860, the Grand Trunk was on the verge of bankruptcy and in no position to expand further east to Halifax. On the eve of the American Civil War, it stretched from Sarnia in the west to Rivière-du-Loup in the east and Portland in the southeast. Colonists in the United Province of Canada, some of whom had experienced their territory being attacked by the United States fifty years earlier (in the War of 1812), were uncomfortably close to the giant Union Army and faced terrorist attacks during the mid-19th century in the form of Fenian raids.

Such security concerns led to demands for a year-round transportation system that British reinforcements could use should their territory be attacked during winter when the St. Lawrence River was frozen, and the only railway for British reinforcements to use would be the Grand Trunk connection at Portland, in the United States. Many citizens thought that the only way to finish the Grand Trunk – and protect the country – would be to unite all the colonies into a federation so that they could share the costs of an expanded railway system. Thus the British North America Act, 1867 included the provision for an Intercolonial Railway to link with the Grand Trunk at Rivière-du-Loup.

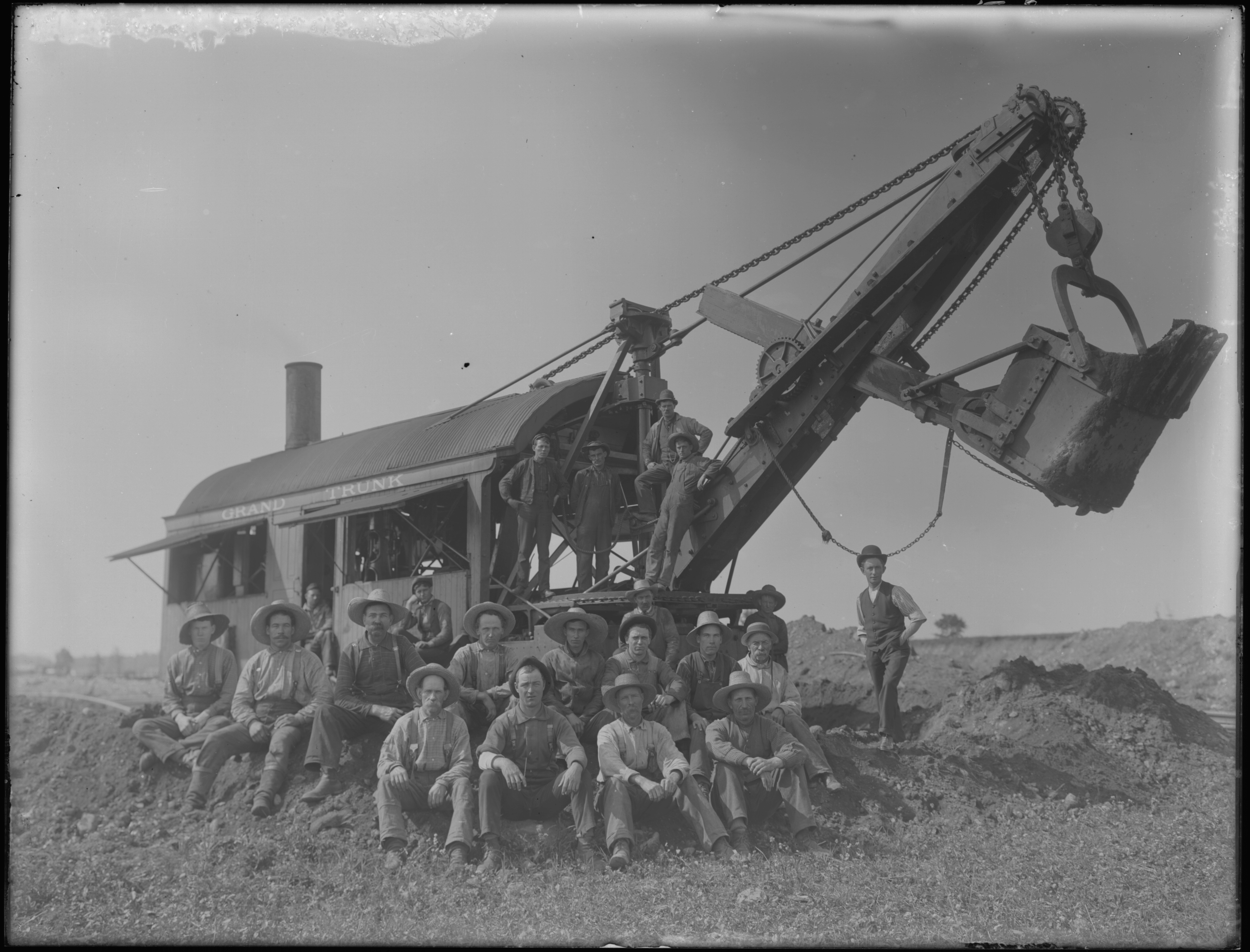
Group of men working on GTR construction, Glengarry County, Ontario, between 1895 and 1910

The end of the American Civil War saw British North America on the verge of uniting in a single federation, and the GTR's financial prospects improved as the railway was well-positioned to take advantage of increased population and economic growth. By 1867, it had become the largest rail system in the world by accumulating more than 2,055 km (1,277 mi) of track that connected locations between its ocean port at Portland, Maine, its river port at Rivière-du-Loup, the three northern New England states, and much of the southern areas of the new provinces of Quebec and Ontario. By 1880, the Grand Trunk Railway system stretched all the way from Portland in the east to Chicago, Illinois, in the west (by means of the Grand Trunk Western Railroad between Port Huron and Chicago).

Several impressive construction feats were associated with the GTR: the first successful bridging of the St. Lawrence River on August 25, 1860, with the opening of the first Victoria Bridge at Montreal (replaced by the present structure in 1898); the bridging of the Niagara River between Fort Erie, Ontario and Buffalo, New York; and the construction of a tunnel beneath the St. Clair River, connecting Sarnia, Ontario, and Port Huron, Michigan. The latter work opened in August 1890 and replaced the railcar ferry at the same location.

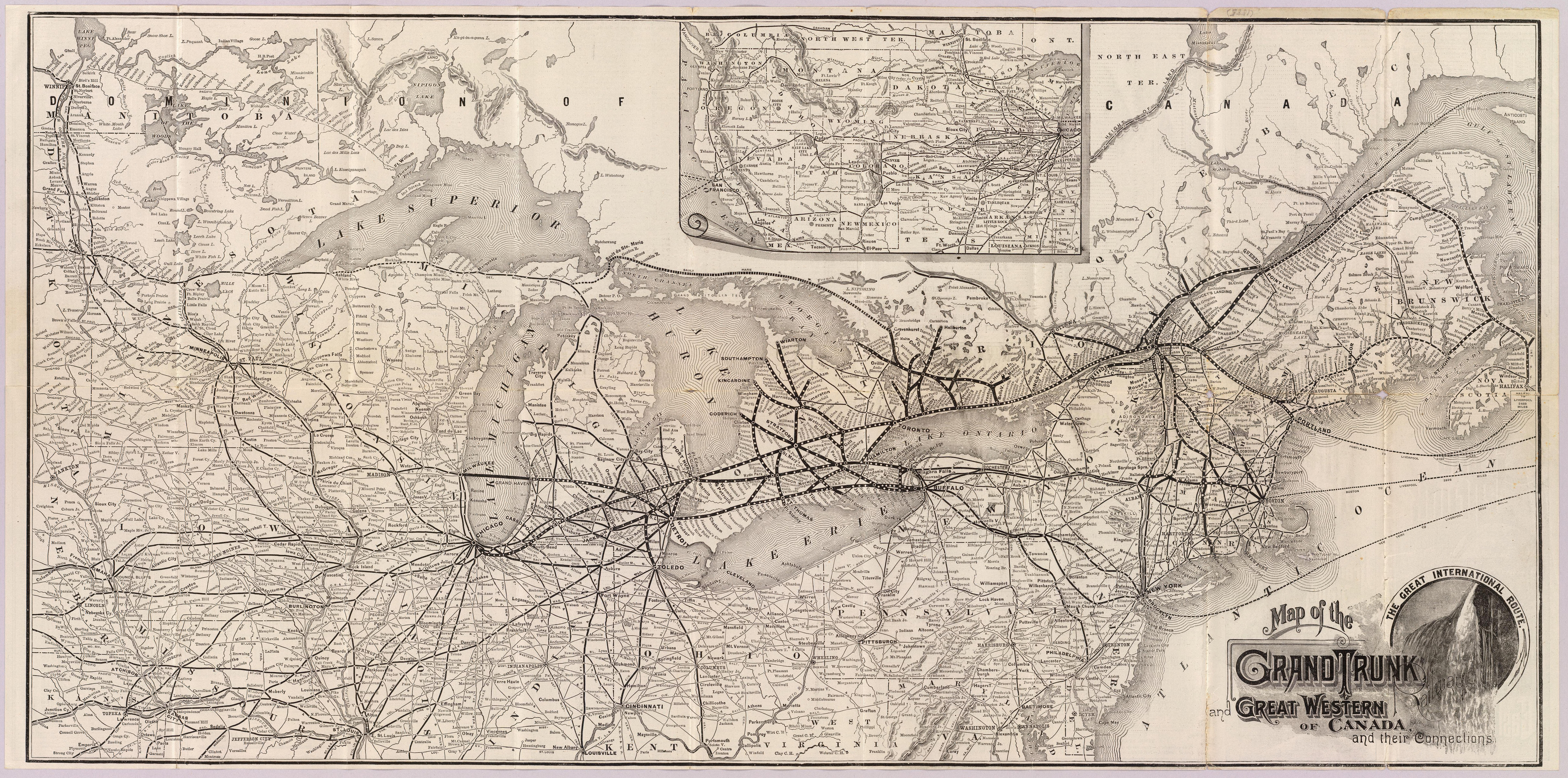
Map of the Grand Trunk in 1885

==== Heyday ====
Common during 19th century railway construction in British colonies, GTR built to a broad gauge (Provincial Gauge) of 5 ft 6 in (1,676 mm); however, this was changed to the standard gauge of 4 ft 8 1/2 in (1,435 mm) between 1872 and 1885 to facilitate interchange with U.S. railroads. To overcome the gauge difference, the GTR experimented with a form of variable-gauge axles called "adjustable gauge trucks", but these proved unreliable.

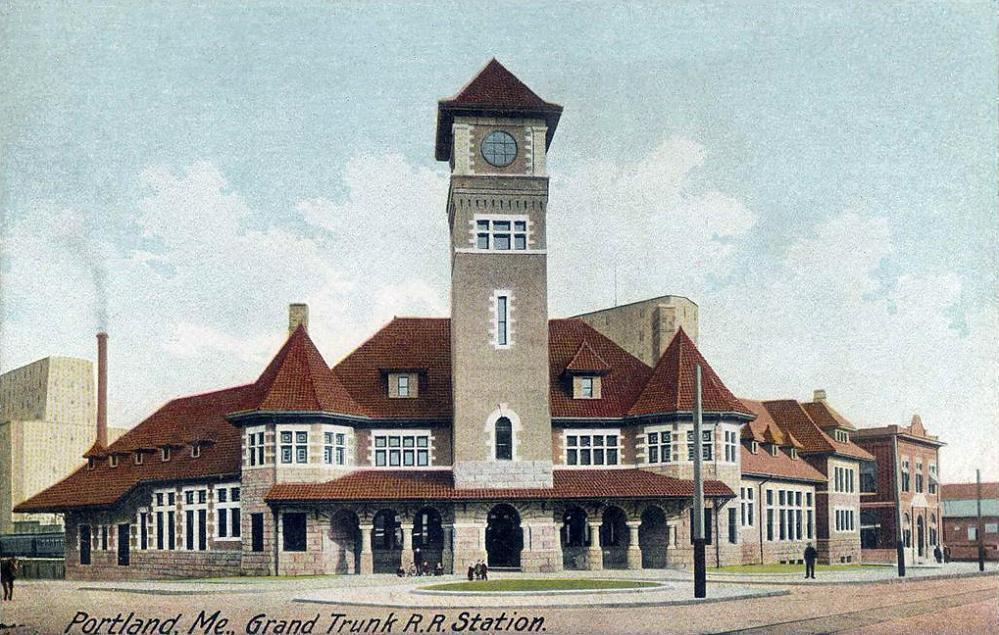
The Grand Trunk station at Portland, Maine, in 1906.

The GTR system expanded throughout southern Ontario, western Quebec, and the U.S. state of Michigan over the years by purchasing and absorbing numerous smaller railway companies, as well as building new lines. GTR's largest purchase came on August 12, 1882, when it bought the 1,371-kilometre (852 mi) Great Western Railway, running from Niagara Falls to Toronto, and connecting to London, Windsor, and communities in the Bruce Peninsula.

The company sold the line along the St. Lawrence River between Rivière-du-Loup and Lévis in 1879 to the federal government-owned Intercolonial Railway (IRC), and granted running rights in 1889 to the IRC on trackage between Lévis and Montreal (via Richmond); however, the IRC's construction of a more direct line from Lévis to Saint-Hyacinthe in 1899 saw most of this traffic transferred to that line.

=== Bankruptcy and nationalization ===
Original logo of the railway

As the dominant railway in British North America, GTR was reportedly asked by the federal government soon after Confederation to consider building a rail line to the Pacific coast at British Columbia but refused, forcing the government to enact legislation creating the Canadian Pacific Railway (CPR) to meet British Columbia's conditions for joining Confederation. By the early 20th century, GTR desired to operate in Western Canada, particularly given the virtual monopoly of service that CPR maintained and the lucrative increasing flows of immigrants west of Ontario. The federal government encouraged GTR to co-operate with a local railway company operating on the Prairies, the Canadian Northern Railway (CNoR), but an agreement was never reached.

CNoR decided to build its own transcontinental system at this time, forcing GTR in 1903 to enter into an agreement with Wilfrid Laurier's government to build a third railway system from the Atlantic to the Pacific. GTR would build (with federal assistance) and operate the Grand Trunk Pacific Railway (GTPR) from Winnipeg, Manitoba to Prince Rupert, British Columbia, while the government would build and own the National Transcontinental Railway (NTR) from Winnipeg to Moncton, New Brunswick via Quebec City, which the GTR would also operate.

As part of this program, the federal government encouraged the GTR to purchase the Canada Atlantic Railway (CAR) with lines southeast from Ottawa to Vermont, and west from Ottawa to Georgian Bay. The GTR took effective control of the CAR in 1905, although the purchase was not ratified by Parliament until 1914.

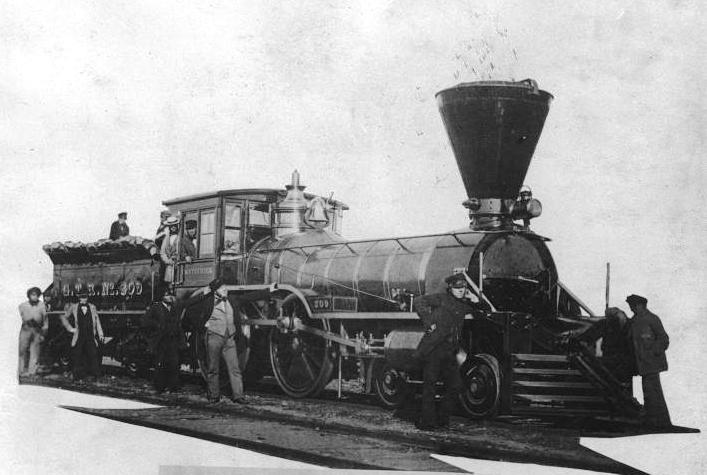
Grand Trunk Locomotive Trevithick utilized on the Victoria Bridge, Montreal, 1859.

The routing of these systems was extremely speculative, as GTPR's main line was located farther north than the profitable CPR main line in the Prairies, and NTR was located even farther north of populous centres in Ontario and Quebec. Construction costs on the GTPR escalated, despite having the most favourable crossing of the Continental Divide in North America at Yellowhead Pass. GTR's cost-conscious president Charles Melville Hays was one of the victims on board RMS Titanic on April 15, 1912. His death is speculated to have contributed to poor management of GTR over the ensuing decade, and also contributed to the abandonment of the uncompleted Southern New England Railway to Providence, Rhode Island, begun in 1910.

Construction started on the GTPR/NTR in 1905, and the GTPR opened to traffic in 1914, followed by the NTR in 1915. It was a transcontinental system, with the only exception being the NTR's ill-fated Quebec Bridge, which would not be completed for several more years.

The first indication the arrangement with the government was faltering came when GTR refused to operate the NTR, citing economic reasons. With the enormous cost of building the GTPR and the limited financial returns being realized, GTR defaulted on loan payments to the federal government in 1919. GTPR was nationalized on March 7 of that year, being operated under a federal government Board of Management until finally being placed under the control of the Crown corporation Canadian National Railways (CNR) on July 20, 1920.

GTR underwent serious financial difficulties as a result of the GTPR, and its shareholders, primarily in the United Kingdom, were determined to prevent the company from being nationalized as well. Eventually on July 12, 1920, GTR was placed under control of another federal government Board of Management while legal battles continued for several more years. Finally, on January 20, 1923, GTR was fully absorbed into the CNR on a date when all constituent companies were merged into the Crown corporation.

At the time that the GTR was fully merged into CNR, approximately 125 smaller railway companies comprised the Grand Trunk system, totalling 12,800 kilometres (8,000 mi) in Canada and 1,873 kilometres (1,164 mi) in the United States.

== Accident ==
Canada's worst railway accident based on loss of life happened on the GTR, occurring on June 29, 1864, when a passenger train operating between Lévis and Montreal missed a signal for an open drawbridge on the Richelieu River near the present-day town of Mont-Saint-Hilaire, Quebec, plunging onto a passing barge and killing 99 German immigrants.

== Legacy ==
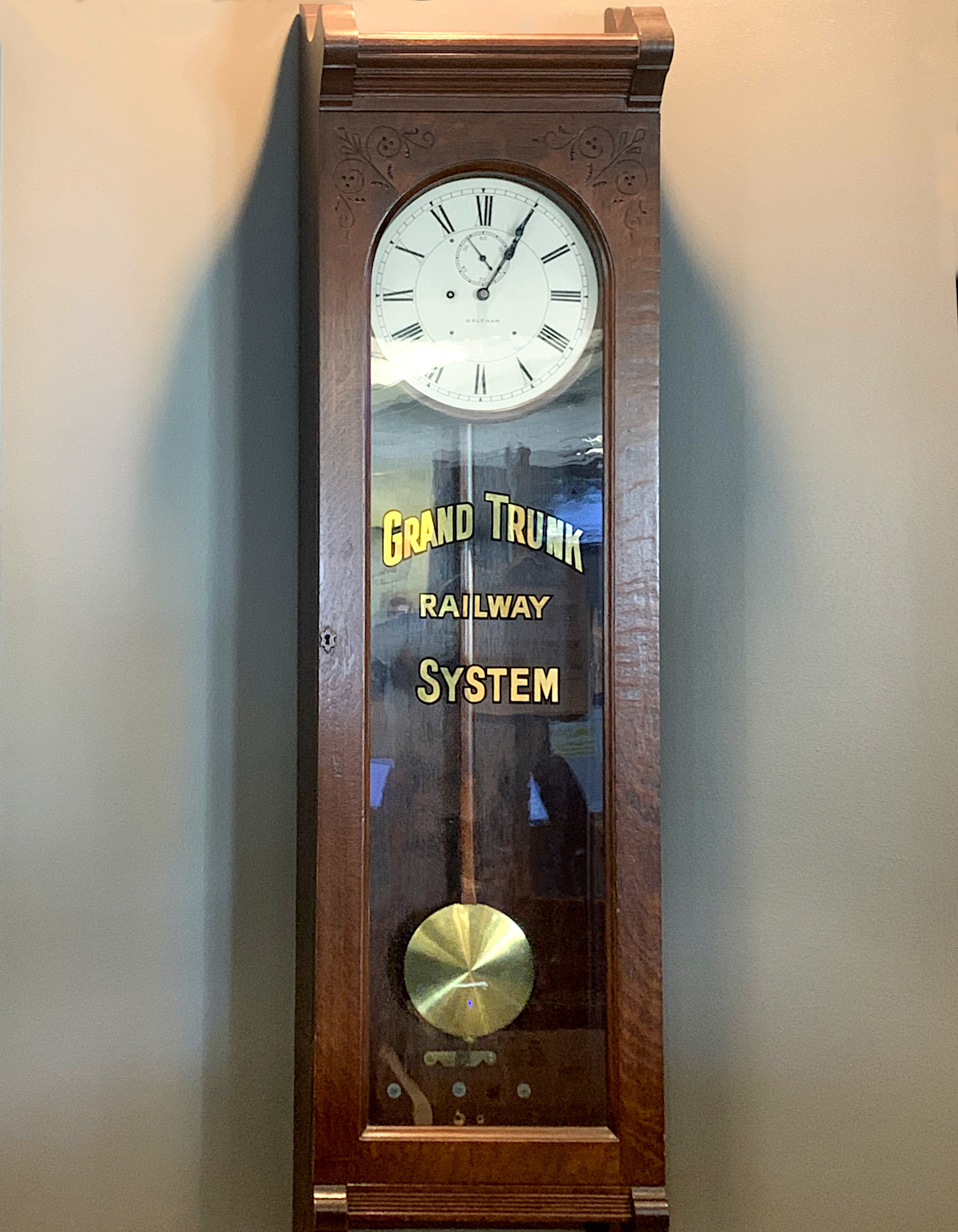
Antique Grand Trunk Railway clock, in use in Via Rail station at Kingston, Ontario

Canadian Rail speculated in 1963 that an independent GTR might have survived had it always used standard gauge. The GTR was a private company headquartered in England that received heavy Canadian government subsidies and was never profitable because of competition from shipping and American railways. (In 1880 40% of the Grand Trunk traffic was from one or another American city to and from Chicago, taking a shortcut across Ontario.) Inflated construction costs, overestimated revenues, and an inadequate initial capitalization threatened bankruptcy for the Grand Trunk.

Sir Joseph Hickson was a key executive from 1874 to 1890 based in Montreal who kept it afloat financially and formed an alliance with the Conservative party. Carlos and Lewis (1995) show that it managed to survive because its British investors accurately assessed the corporation's value and prospects, which included the likelihood that the Canadian government would bail out the railway should it ever default on its bonds. The government had guaranteed a very large loan and had enacted legislation authorizing debt restructuring. These arrangements allowed the company to float new bond issues to replace existing debt and to issue securities in lieu of interest.

Charles Melville Hays joined the Grand Trunk in 1895 as general manager (and in 1909, president, based in Montreal). Hays was the architect of the great expansion during a colourful and free-spending era. He upgraded the tracks, bridges, shops and rolling stock, but was best known for building huge grain elevators and elaborate tourist hotels such as the Château Laurier in Ottawa. Hays blundered in 1903 by building a subsidiary, the Grand Trunk Pacific Railway Company some 4,800 kilometres (3,000 mi) long; it reached Prince Rupert in northern British Columbia in 1914. The government built and the Grand Trunk was to operate the National Transcontinental to link the main Grand Trunk with its Pacific subsidiary. The very expensive subsidiary was far north of major population centres and had too little traffic.

Nearing bankruptcy in 1919, the entire system was nationalized: the government merged the Grand Trunk, the Grand Trunk Pacific, and the National Transcontinental lines into the new Canadian National Railways. The process was completed in 1923. The Grand Trunk lines in the United States, however, kept their distinctive name.

GTR corporate headquarters in London at 17-19 Cockspur Street in London was used by CNR and later sold. This building is now home to other businesses including the Original London Visitor Centre.

The Grand Trunk legacy seeped into late 20th century popular culture, when a hard rock trio from Flint, Michigan, called itself Grand Funk Railroad in 1969.

== GTR hotels ==
Like the CPR and CNR, the GTR began building and operating hotels during the first two decades of the 20th century. Most of the hotels survived the takeover of the GTR by CNR in 1923 and were operated by Canadian National Hotels:

- Château Laurier (Ottawa) 1912-1923 - acquired by Canadian National Hotels and later by Canadian Pacific Hotels; now part of the Fairmont Hotels and Resorts chain
- Hotel Macdonald (Edmonton) 1912-1923 - acquired by Canadian National Hotels and later by Canadian Pacific Hotels; now part of the Fairmont Hotels and Resorts chain
- Fort Garry Hotel (Winnipeg) 1913-1923 - acquired by Canadian National Hotels and now independently operated
- Highland Inn (Algonquin Park) 1905–1923; sold to Government of Ontario and demolished

== Grand Trunk today ==
Grand Trunk Railway was built fully a century before major property and highway development took place in the various jurisdictions it crossed and as such had the choice of geography in selecting the most direct routes. As a result, significant sections of GTR mainlines in Canada and Grand Trunk Western routes in the U.S. are still in active use by Canadian National (CN) today, particularly the Quebec City–Chicago corridor by way of Drummondville, Montreal, Kingston, Toronto, London, Sarnia/Port Huron, and Battle Creek.

Following deregulation of the railway industry in Canada and the United States, CN has abandoned or sold many former GTR and GTW branch lines in recent decades, including the former Portland–Montreal main line which had instigated the development of the system to a large degree. As well, a part of the original Toronto–Sarnia routing via St. Mary's Junction and Forest to Point Edward, Ontario, was sold or abandoned, using the Great Western Railway routing instead.

=== Grand Trunk Corporation ===
CN continues to use the "Grand Trunk" name for its holding company the Grand Trunk Corporation. The corporation was created in 1971 to provide autonomy in operation for CN's US subsidiaries: Grand Trunk Western Railroad; Duluth, Winnipeg & Pacific Railway; and the Central Vermont Railway. The main goal of the corporation, headquartered in Detroit, was to make GTW profitable and keep parent CN from having to subsidize GTW's losses. CN sold off the Central Vermont in 1995 when CN became a public traded company instead of a crown corporation.

CN continued to place its US acquisitions as subsidiaries under the Grand Trunk Corporation which includes Illinois Central, Wisconsin Central, and Great Lakes Transportation. The Association of American Railroads considers the Grand Trunk Corporation as a Class I railroad.

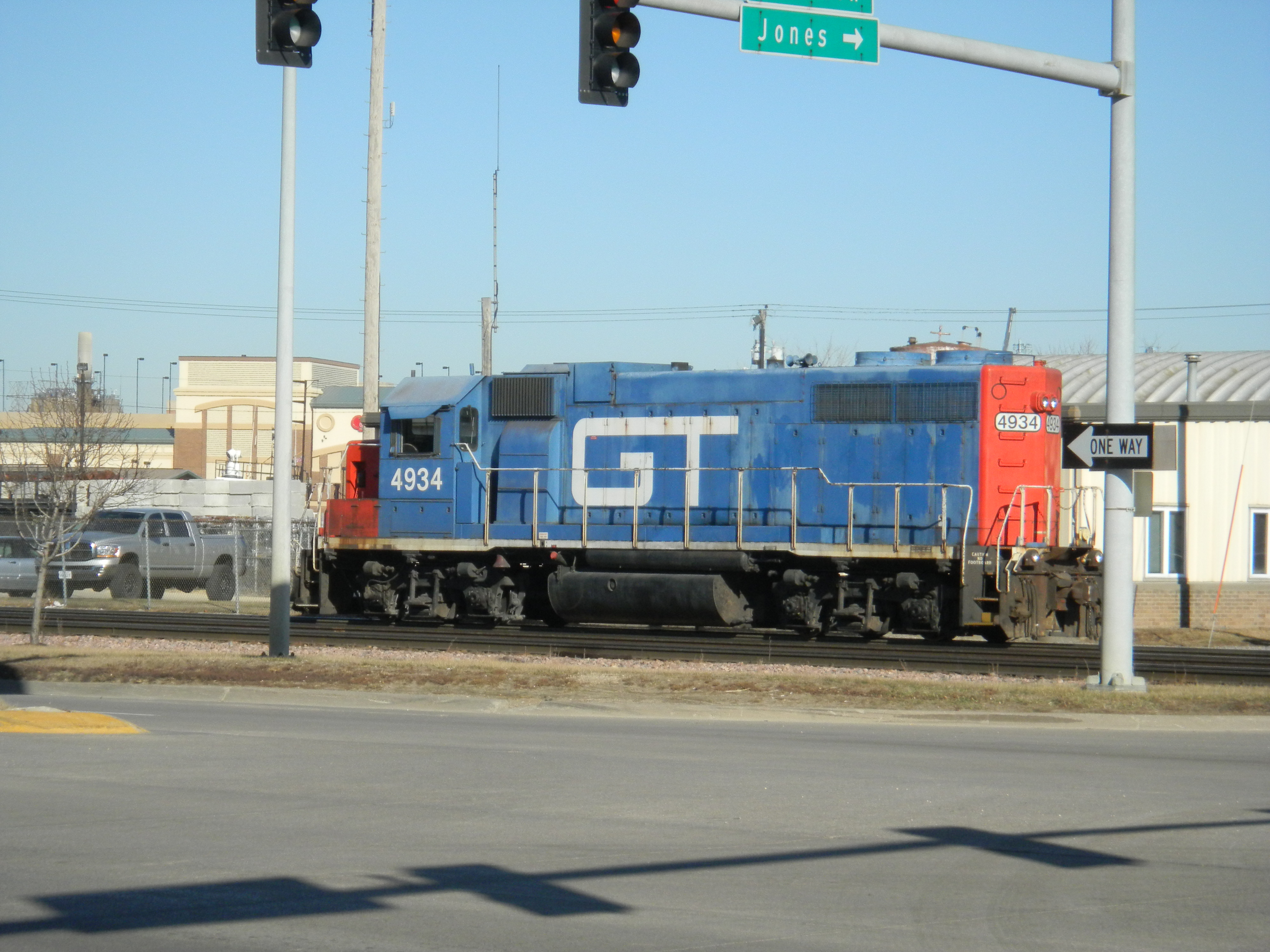
GTW 4934 at Dubuque, Iowa

The Portland, Maine-Chicago, Illinois mainline of the Grand Trunk is or was known by the following names:

- CN Berlin Subdivision, Portland to Island Pond
- CN Sherbrooke Subdivision, Island Pond to Saint-Hyacinthe
- CN Saint-Hyacinthe Subdivision, Saint-Hyacinthe to Montreal
- CN Montreal Subdivision, Montreal to Dorval
- CN Kingston Subdivision, Dorval to Toronto
- CN Weston Subdivision, Toronto to Brampton
- CN Halton Subdivision, Brampton to Georgetown
- CN Guelph Subdivision, Georgetown to St. Marys
- CN Forest Subdivision, St. Marys to Sarnia (St. Clair Tunnel)
- GTW Flint Subdivision, Port Huron (St. Clair Tunnel) to Battle Creek
- GTW Southbend Subdivision, Battle Creek to Chicago

The Montreal-Toronto segment had been known by the following names:

- CNR Cornwall Subdivision, Dorval to Brockville
- CNR Gananoque Subdivision, Brockville to Belleville
- CNR Oshawa Subdivision, Belleville to Toronto

The Grand Trunk Railway Building on Warwick House Street in London continues to stand. Built by Aston Webb, the 7 storey building was built in 1907 with the banner The Grand Trunk Railway of Canada on 4 Warwick House Street and Canadian National Railway on Cockspur Street. CN no longer owns the building. The current tenant on the lower floor is The Original London Tour Centre at 17–19 Cockspur Street.

== In popular culture ==
In Series 3, Episode 1 of Downton Abbey, which takes place during the spring of 1920, Robert Crawley, Earl of Grantham learns that he has lost most of the fortune that he received from his wife Cora, which Lord Grantham had largely invested in Grand Trunk Railway stock.

== Leadership ==
The leaders of the company were:

=== President ===
1. John Ross, 1852–1862
2. Sir Edward William Watkin, 1862–1869
3. Richard Potter, 1869–1876
4. Sir Henry Whatley Tyler, 1876–1895
5. Sir Charles Rivers Wilson, 1895–1910
6. Charles Melville Hays, 1910–1912
7. Edson Joseph Chamberlin, 1912–1917
8. Howard George Kelley, 1917–1922

=== Managing Director (to 1874) and General Manager (from 1874) ===
1. Sir Cusack Patrick Roney, 1853
2. Thomas Evans Blackwell, 1853–1862
3. Charles John Brydges, 1862–1874
4. Sir Joseph Hickson, 1874–1890
5. Lewis James Seargeant, 1891–1896
6. Charles Melville Hays, 1896–1901
7. George Bell Reeve, 1901
8. Charles Melville Hays, 1902–1912
9. William Doig Robb, 1922–1923

=== Chairman of the Board ===
1. Sir Alfred Waldron Smithers, 1910–1921

== See also ==
- Guelph Junction Railway
- Pontiac Pacific Junction Railway
- List of defunct railroads of North America
- Edson Joseph Chamberlin, president
- History of rail transport in Canada
- Grand Trunk Railway Literary and Scientific Society

== Bibliography ==
- Baskerville, Peter (1990). "Hickson, Sir Joseph". In Halpenny, Francess G. (ed.). Dictionary of Canadian Biography. Vol. XII (1891–1900) (online ed.). University of Toronto Press.
- Baskerville, Peter (1981). "Americans in Britain's backyard: the railway era in Upper Canada, 1850–1880". Business History Review. 55 (3): 314–36. doi:10.2307/3114127. JSTOR 3114127. S2CID 155762840.
- Carlos, Ann M.; Lewis, Frank D. (1995). "The Creative Financing of an Unprofitable Enterprise: the Grand Trunk Railway of Canada, 1853-1881". Explorations in Economic History. 32 (3): 273–301. doi:10.1006/exeh.1995.1012. ISSN 0014-4983.
- Clegg, Anthony; Corley, Ray (1969). Canadian National Steam Power. Trains & Trolleys.
- Currie, A. W. (1957). The Grand Trunk Railway of Canada. University of Toronto Press. OCLC 563715.
- Hofsommer, Don L. (1995), Grand Trunk Corporation: Canadian National Railways in the United States, 1971-1992, East Lansing, Michigan: Michigan State University Press, ISBN 978-0-87013-406-7 – via Google Books.
- Holt, Jeff (1986). The Grand Trunk in New England. Railfare.
- Leonard, Frank (1996). A Thousand Blunders: The Grand Trunk Pacific Railway and Northern British Columbia. Archived from the original on 2008-06-21 – via Questia.
- Regehr, Theodore D. (1998). "Hays, Charles Melville". In Cook, Ramsay; Hamelin, Jean (eds.). Dictionary of Canadian Biography. Vol. XIV (1911–1920) (online ed.). University of Toronto Press.

=== Primary sources ===
- Canada. Legislature. Legislative Assembly. Special Committee on the Condition, Management and Prospects of the Grand Trunk. Report 1857, 263 pages online
