= Charles Rivers Wilson =

British civil servant and financier (1831–1916)

Sir Charles Rivers Wilson GCMG
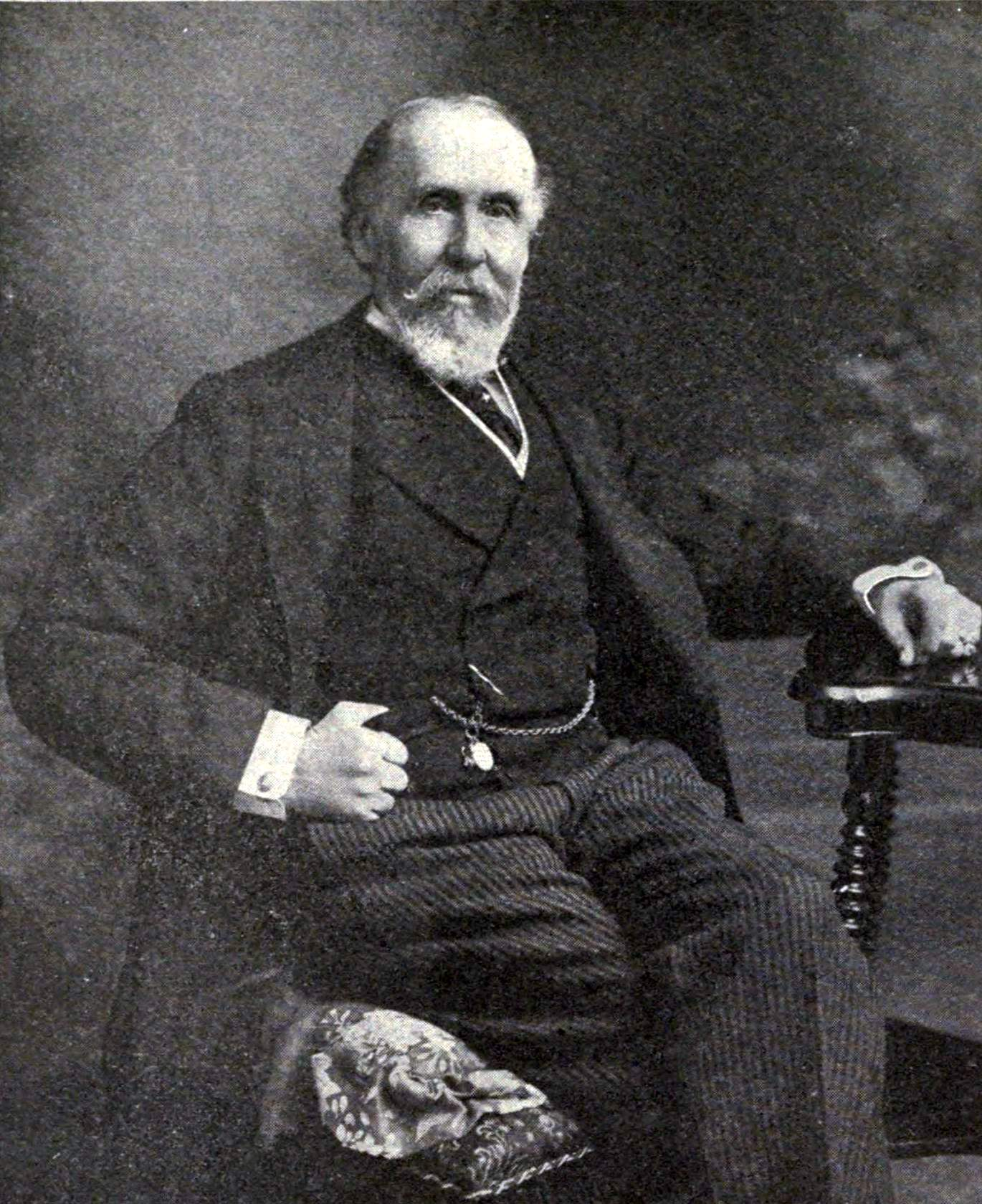
- Born: February 19, 1831; London, England
- Died: February 9, 1916 (aged 84); London, England
- Resting place: Kensal Green Cemetery
- Education: Eton College
- Alma mater: Balliol College, Oxford
- Occupations: Civil servant; financier

Sir Charles Rivers Wilson, GCMG (1831–1916) was a British civil servant and financier.

== Biography ==
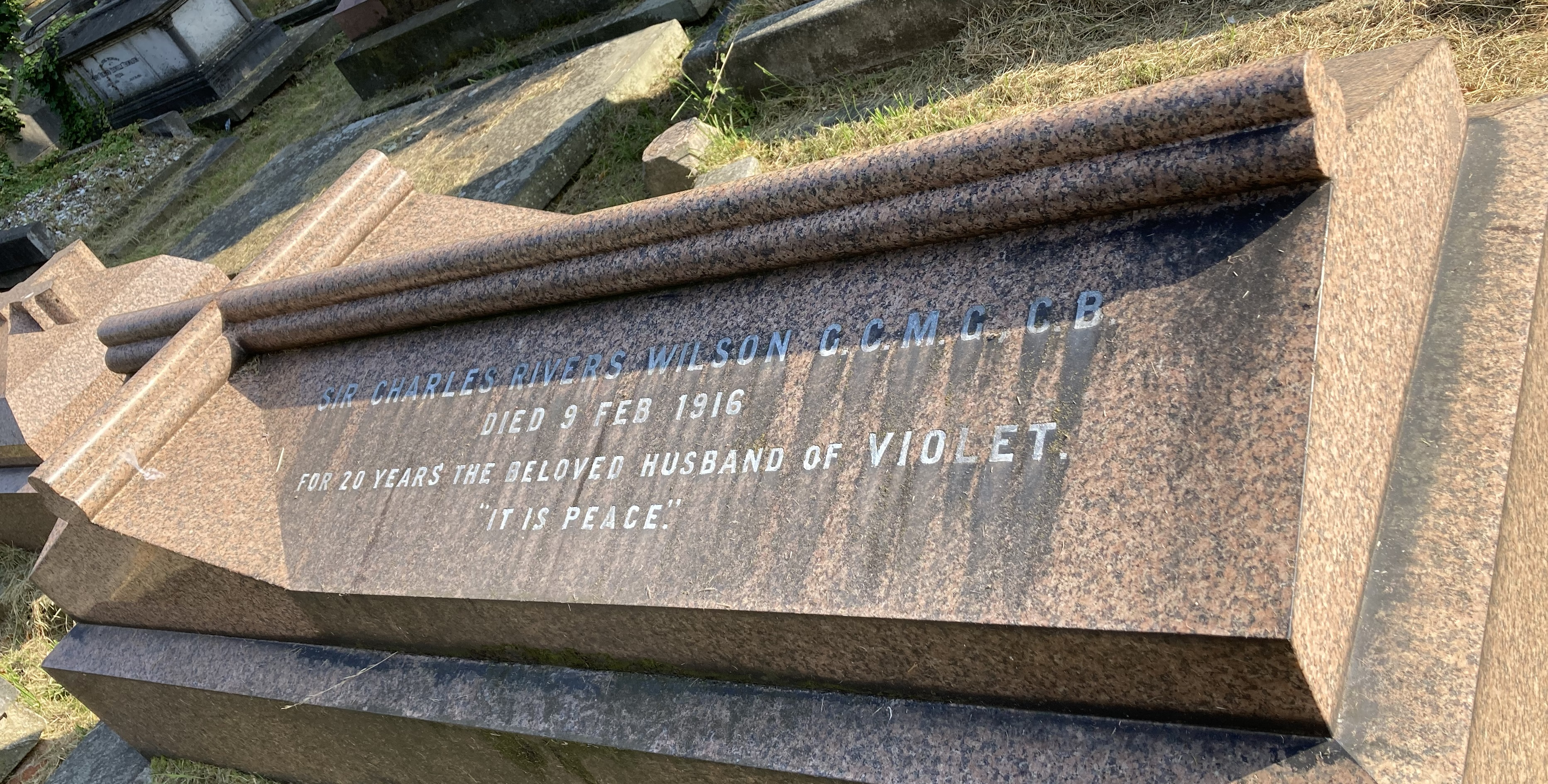
Grave of Sir Charles Rivers Wilson in Kensal Green Cemetery

Wilson was born in London on 19 February 1831. He studied at Eton College and Balliol College, Oxford. He entered the Treasury in 1856, and was private secretary to the Chancellor of the Exchequer (Robert Lowe) from 1868 to 1873. He was Royal Commissioner for the Paris Exhibition of 1878, having been already appointed Comptroller General of Office for Reduction of National Debt in 1874.

Whilst holding this position, Wilson visited Egypt in 1876 and he was appointed a government director of the Suez Canal Company. Early in 1878 he was selected as vice-president of the Commission to enquire into the Egyptian financial situation. A few months later, in May, Wilson was nominated Financial Minister in Egypt.

In 1879, Wilson and the first Prime Minister of Egypt, Nubar Pasha, were the victims of a serious outrage by the mob in the streets of Cairo – an incident which was the direct precursor of the Urabi revolt and the British occupation of Egypt in 1882. In April 1880, on the fall of the Khedive Ismail and the inauguration of his son Tewfik as Khedive, Wilson was appointed president of the Commission for the Liquidation of the Egyptian Debt, with full powers to regulate the financial position of Egypt. On the conclusion of this duty he returned to his post in London.

On retiring from his post as Comptroller General of the National Debt Office in 1894, he became in 1895 president of the Grand Trunk Railway of Canada. He appointed Charles Melville Hays as general manager, who undertook a major reorganisation of the railway. In 1903 he launched the Grand Trunk Pacific Railway. He also served as director of the Alliance Assurance Company (from 1880), and as chairman of British Electric Traction Company from 1896.

He was created a K.C.M.G. in 1880 and was promoted G.C.M.G. in 1895. Married twice, he had no children and he died in London on 9 February 1916. He is buried with his second wife, Violet, in Kensal Green Cemetery, opposite the grave of Wilkie Collins.

The town of Rivers, Manitoba is named after him.
