= Alma Rattenbury =

English-Canadian songwriter, tried for murder

- Born: Alma Victoria Wolfe; 1897/8; Prince Rupert, British Columbia, Canada
- Died: 4 June 1935 (age 37); Bournemouth, Dorset, England
- Known for: Accused of the murder of Francis Rattenbury
- Criminal charges: Murder
- Criminal status: not guilty
- Spouses: C. R. J. R. Dolling (m. 1914; † 1916) Compton Packenham (m. 1921; div. 1925) Francis Rattenbury (m. 1925; murdered 1934)
- Children: 2 sons
- War service
- Period of service: January 1917–January 1918
- Rank: Orderly
- Unit: Scottish Women's Hospitals for Foreign Service
- Conflicts: First World War
- Awards: Croix de Guerre

Alma Victoria Rattenbury (née Wolfe, also Clarke, Radclyffe Dolling and Packenham; 1897/8–4 June 1935) was an English-Canadian songwriter who was tried for murder.

Born and educated in Canada, she was a talented musician and played with the Toronto Symphony Orchestra. She married for the first time to Caledon Robert John Radclyffe Dolling in 1914, a relative of the Earl of Caledon. With the outbreak of the First World War, her husband joined up. He was initially stationed in Prince Rupert, where she involved herself in entertaining the troops. In August 1915, they moved to England and her husband was posted to France in October 1915. She worked at the War Office. Her husband was awarded the Military Cross for bravery before being killed in action during the First Battle of the Somme. Following her husband's death, she volunteered with the Scottish Women's Hospitals for Foreign Service, and served with distinction in France. Having been wounded twice, she was awarded the French Croix de Guerre for her war service.

In 1918, she began a relationship with the then-married Compton Packenham. He divorced his wife in 1920, and the couple emigrated to the United States. He was employed as a lecturer, wrongly claiming to hold a doctorate, and she worked as a piano teacher. They married in 1921 and had a son. However, the relationship failed, and she took her son and returned to her native Canada in 1922; they formally divorced in 1925. She continued to give music lessons, and also composed song music with the pen name Lozanne.

While in Vancouver, she met Francis Mawson Rattenbury, a noted architect, and they began a relationship. In 1925, he divorced his first wife and married Alma. The scandal that followed the affair and divorce meant that the couple chose to emigrate to England to start a new life. They settled in Bournemouth and had a son in 1928. Following the birth, they lived a celibate life with separate bedrooms on separate floors of their home, Villa Madeira. In September 1934, they employed George Stoner (born 1916) as a chauffeur and handyman, and he moved in to live with them. Stoner and Alma began an affair; Rattenbury was aware and tolerated it.

On 24 March 1935, Rattenbury was attacked with a wooden mallet while sleeping in an armchair in their drawing room. A local doctor was called and Rattenbury was transferred to a nursing home, but he died five days later. The morning after the attack, and having been heavily sedated the night before by the doctor, Alma admitted to attacking him. After Rattenbury died, both Alma and Stoner were arrested and charged with having murdered him alone. The sensational trial took place between 27 May and 31 May 1935, and was heavily covered in the press. Alma was found not guilty, while Stoner was found guilty and sentenced to death, with a recommendation for mercy from the jury. Days later, on 4 June, Alma committed suicide by stabbing herself in the chest six times. Stoner's sentence was commuted to life imprisonment, but he only served seven years before being allowed to join the British Army during World War II.

== Biography ==
Alma Victoria Wolfe was born to a gold mining prospector and his wife, Elizabeth, who was reputedly related to the cricketer W. G. Grace. Alma was probably born in Prince Rupert, British Columbia, Canada. After her father disappeared, her mother re-married and Alma took her step-father's surname of Clarke. She was educated in Kamloops and Toronto. Showing great musical talent, she was reportedly a soloist with the Toronto Symphony Orchestra by the age of seventeen.

=== First marriage and the First World War ===
In 1914, Alma married Caledon Robert John Radclyffe Dolling, the nephew of Eric Alexander, 5th Earl of Caledon and a resident of Vancouver. With the outbreak of the First World War, he joined up and was commissioned in the 11th Irish Fusiliers of Canada. He was posted to Prince Rupert as second in command, and was involved in local guard duties and the training of soldiers. Alma devoted her spare time to entertaining the troops and creating competitions for them.

In August 1915, the couple moved to England and her husband was granted a commission in the Royal Welch Fusiliers in September 1915: he was posted to France in October 1915. Alma worked at the War Office in central London, while living with her aunt-in-law in Chislehurst. Her first husband was awarded the Military Cross (MC) for leading a night raid to capture a crater from the Germans on 6 February 1916: he was injured and 40 British soldiers died during the action. He was injured for a second time on 25 April during a raid on the German trenches and required hospital treatment. He was granted leave to attend the investiture ceremony at Buckingham Palace for his MC on 29 May 1916: Alma accompanied her husband to the palace but was obliged to wait outside while he received his medal from King George V. He returned to France and the front in July 1916. On 3 August, he was made a temporary captain and the officer commanding B Company, 2nd Battalion. He was killed in action on 20 August 1916 during the First Battle of the Somme. This left Alma widowed at the age of 24.

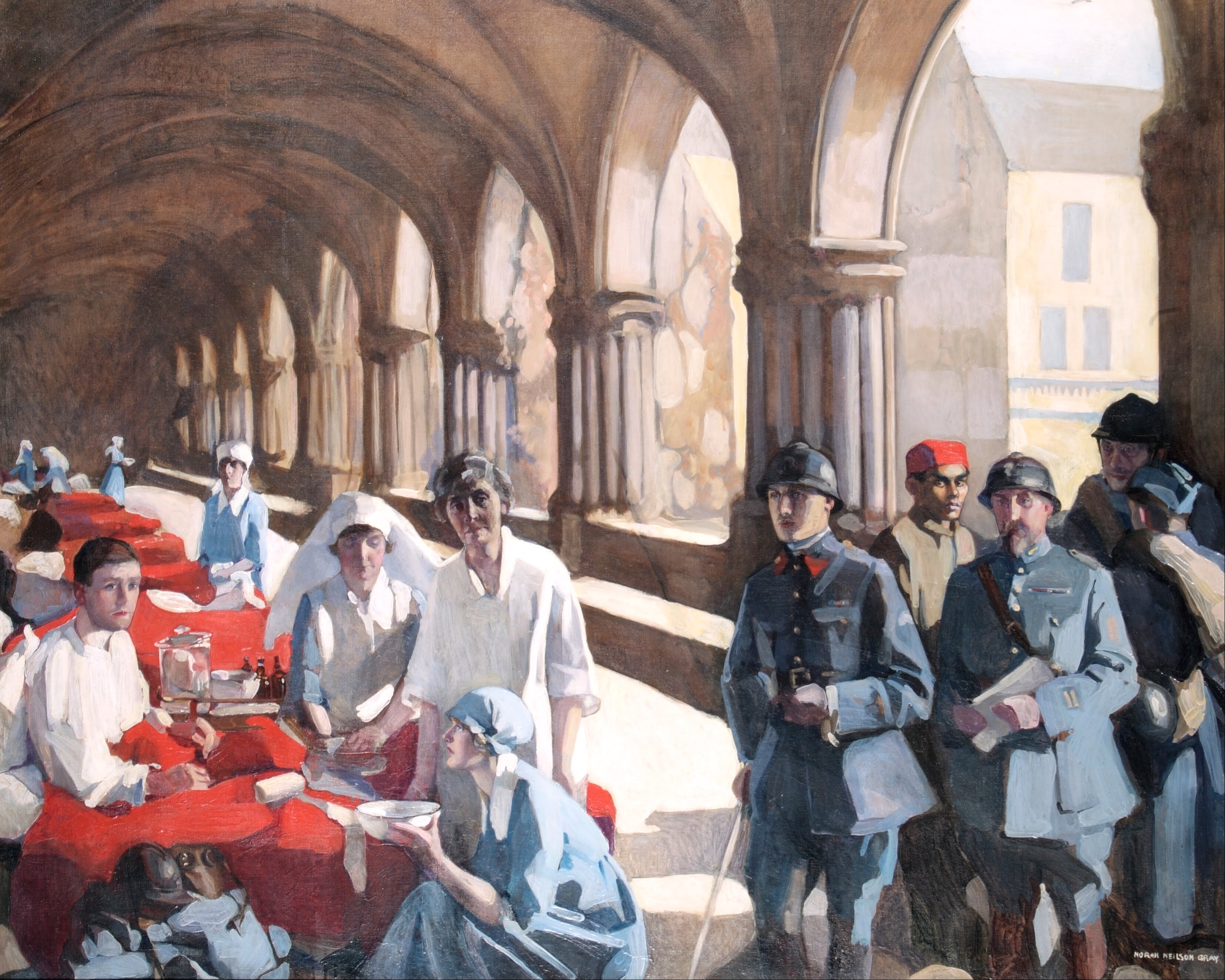
Impression of the Scottish Women's Hospital at Royaumont; painting by Norah Neilson Gray.

Following her husband's death, she underwent a protracted process to be awarded the correct widow's pension. She was initially offered only a second lieutenant's pension but, with a supporting letter from a former prime minister of Canada, she was finally awarded a captain's war widow pension of £100 a year plus a £250 gratuity (equivalent to £8,000 and £19,000 in 2025). Now financially independent, and influenced in part by the wish to see her husband's grave in France, she volunteered with the Scottish Women's Hospitals for Foreign Service as a stretcher bearer and field ambulance orderly.

On 6 January 1917 Alma arrived in Creil, France, to begin her work as an orderly at the Scottish Women's Hospital at Royaumont Abbey. The volunteers were not paid but did receive a uniform, free lodging and board. Orderlies were the lowest rank of the hospital hierarchy; they undertook strenuous and emotionally draining activities such as cleaning blood from the floor of the operating theatre, holding down men or their limbs as amputations took place, carrying stretchers of injured or dead soldiers up and down flights of stairs, and changing bed linen. In the summer of 1917 an auxiliary hospital was set up at Villers-Cotterêts, closer to the front, and Alma was one of the first group to staff the converted wooden huts which had become fully operational in August. She wrote in a letter that she could sleep through the bombing falling nearby, but would regularly wake at the sound of rats scratching near her sleeping area. Then, from October 1917, she returned to work at Royaumont Abbey. While in France she was attached to the French Red Cross and served with distinction, being awarded the Croix de Guerre with star and palm. She was twice wounded during the war. In January 1918, she returned to England.

It was later stated that her experiences in the war, including the loss of her husband and her volunteer work, changed her irreparably.

=== Post-war and second marriage ===
In January 1918 Compton Packenham was on leave from the Army in London when he met and began a relationship with Alma. Packenham had married Phyllis Price in 1915 but, in October 1918, he wrote a letter to his first wife informing her that their marriage was over. Alma was cited in the Packenhams' divorce in 1920.

In 1920, the couple emigrated to the United States of America, claiming on their Ellis Island entrance papers that they were a married Irish couple and that Compton was the son of his childless uncle, William Pakenham. They lived in an apartment on Eleventh Avenue, New York City. Pakenham found work as a lecturer on Japan, claiming to have attended the University of Oxford and calling himself "Dr Pakenham"; he had never attended university and held no degrees. Alma gave piano lessons, in contrast to her pre-war status as a concert soloist. The couple married in 1921 and they had a son, Christopher, in July 1921. However, Alma left Pakenham to return to her native Canada in March 1922; their marriage formally ended in divorce in 1925. Alma earned her living in Canada by giving music lessons and composing song music under the pen name Lozanne. Her songs were sung by the likes of Richard Tauber and Frank Titterton, and played by bandleaders such as Bert Ambrose.

=== Third marriage and murder ===
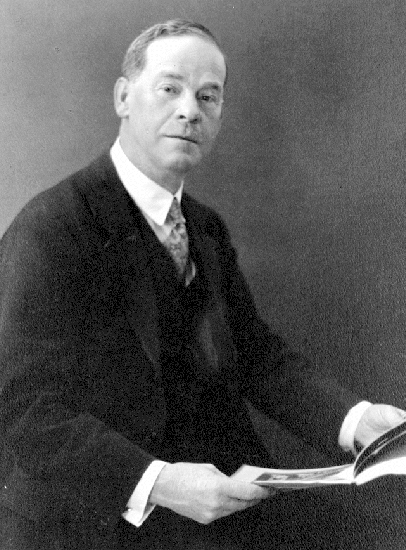
Francis Rattenbury in 1924

In 1925, Alma officially divorced Pakenham and was cited in the divorce of Francis Rattenbury (born 1867) from his first wife. Rattenbury had been born and educated in Leeds, England, and had trained as an architect. In 1892 he emigrated to Canada, settling in Vancouver and establishing himself as a leading architect in British Columbia. Amongst his designs were the British Columbia Parliament Buildings and The Empress Hotel. The couple married in late 1925 but the controversy that surrounded their infidelity and his subsequent divorce led to their decision to emigrate to England. They had one son, John, born in 1928. That year, Rattenbury retired at the age of 60.

Following the birth of their son the couple maintained a celibate relationship, with separate bedrooms on separate floors of their home, the Villa Madeira, 5 Manor Road, Bournemouth. They did not have an unhappy marriage but neither was it an entirely happy one. They occasionally quarrelled about money: Rattenbury gave his wife £1000 (equivalent to £54,000 in 2025) a year to cover all household expenses including bills, clothing, food and alcohol (Rattenbury was a heavy drinker of whisky), and the education of her first son. The only major quarrel, in which Rattenbury gave Alma a black eye, occurred in July 1934 and was related to his depressive turns in which he would threaten suicide.

On 25 September 1934, the couple advertised in the Bournemouth Daily Echo for a teenage male live-in servant. The advertisement was answered by George Percy Stoner (born 1916), a 17-year-old who was thereafter employed by the couple as a chauffeur and handyman. Stoner turned 18 in November 1934 and at some point became the lover of Alma; her husband, Rattenbury, was a mari complaisant (i.e. he knew of and tolerated the affair).

On 24 March 1935 Rattenbury was sleeping in an armchair in the drawing room when he was struck multiple times in the head with a wooden carpenter's hammer. Alma summoned the local doctor, who arrived by taxi. He found Rattenbury lying on his bed in the downstairs bedroom, with a blood-soaked sheet wrapped around his head and without his trousers; he was unconscious. There was blood covering the armchair and carpet, in the drawing room next door. The local doctor called in a surgeon who, having inspected Rattenbury with difficulty as Alma kept interfering, called an ambulance to take him to Strathallen Nursing Home. There, his head was shaved and three wounds were identified, confirming foul play, contrary to the preliminary assumption of the local doctor that Rattenbury had hit his head on the grand piano in the drawing room.

Alma was "highly excited, incoherent, and intoxicated" and, when the police arrived, declared that she was the one who had attacked her husband with a mallet. She had to be sedated by the local doctor, who had returned to Villa Madeira at 4am with "half a grain of morphia". The following morning Alma was taken to the police station where she stated "That is right — I did it deliberately, and would do it again". She was charged with grievous bodily harm with intent to murder. She later stated that she had no recollection of that night and could not remember signing a confession.

On 28 March 1935 Rattenbury died of his injuries and Stoner admitted that he had struck him with a mallet. The following day, on 29 March, Alma and Stoner were both arrested and charged with murder at Bournemouth Magistrates' Court. The Director of Public Prosecutions decided to proceed against both parties, as both had admitted murder. They were not charged with conspiracy; rather, each was separately charged with committing the murder while acting alone.

=== Trial and death ===
Both Alma and Stoner entered not guilty pleas. The trial opened on 27 May 1935 at the Central Criminal Court of England and Wales (the Old Bailey), before Sir Travers Humphreys. The trial was heavily covered in the press, with one newspaper sending the entertainment editor rather than a crime writer to cover it. On 31 May, following clear direction from the judge and after less than an hour of deliberation, the jury acquitted Alma and convicted Stoner.

There was probably no one in England, and no one in Court when the trial opened, save Mrs. Rattenbury, her solicitor and counsel, Stoner and his solicitor and counsel, and Irene Riggs, who did not think Mrs. Rattenbury was guilty of the crime of murder. [...] The whole truth about Mrs. Rattenbury came out during the trial, and the woman, who at first seemed so guilty, was seen to be undoubtedly innocent.

— F. Tennyson Jesse

On 4 June Alma bought a knife, travelled to Bournemouth, and on the bank of the River Avon near Christchurch Priory, stabbed herself in the chest six times, three times penetrating her heart. She left a note stating: "If I only thought it would help Stoner I would stay but it has been pointed out too vividly that I cannot help him—and that is my death sentence". She was buried on 8 June 1935 at Wimborne Road Cemetery, Bournemouth, in a grave separate from her husband's. Owing to the publicity surrounding the case, souvenir-hunters stole flowers from the grave and burgled Villa Madeira.

Stoner was sentenced to death, albeit with a recommendation for mercy from the jury. His sentence was later commuted to life imprisonment. He served seven years in prison before being released to serve in the British Army for the Second World War. Afterwards, he returned to the Bournemouth area and got married. In 1987, Stoner broke his silence about this case after a play about the murder was shown on ITV in 1987.

"It was so long ago and there was no other person to witness the actual event. The whole crime was committed on an emotional basis. Both I and the lady involved were in a highly emotional state. Our emotions were completely out of control."

Stoner said he had been accepted in Bournemouth:

"I have lived here all my life and no one has ever said they were disgusted. They have always sympathised and I have admitted I made a mistake."

In 1990, Stoner was placed on probation for the indecent assault of a 12-year-old boy in a bathroom in Bournemouth. He died in Christchurch in 2000.

== Cultural references ==
- In 1937, playwright and actor Emlyn Williams suggested to producer Alexander Korda the idea of making a film about "the Rattenbury murder case" with actors Laurence Olivier and Merle Oberon. Williams then joined Oberon in the cast of Korda's film I, Claudius instead. A television play based on the case, Killer In Close-Up: The Rattenbury Case, written by George F. Kerr, and produced by Melbourne television station ABV-2, was broadcast on June 18, 1958.
- The case was dramatised for Australian television in 1958 by George F. Kerr as an episode of Killer in Close-Up
- The case was the basis of the radio and stage play Cause Célèbre by Sir Terence Rattigan. A British television adaptation of the Rattigan play was produced by Anglia and shown on ITV on 23 August 1987, with Helen Mirren portraying Alma.
- The 2014 Sarah Waters' novel The Paying Guests was part inspired by the murder.
- The 2018 novel Our Friends In Berlin by the author Anthony Quinn mentions the trial as part of its historical background.
- Sean O'Connor's 2019 account of the case The Fatal Passion of Alma Rattenbury
