= Francis Rattenbury =

British architect active in Canada (1867–1935)

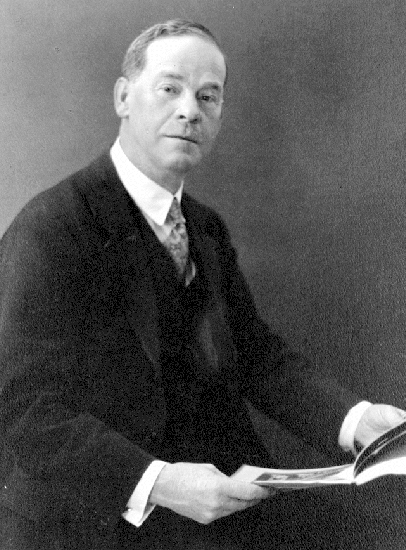
- Rattenbury in 1924
- Born: 11 October 1867; Leeds, West Riding of Yorkshire, UK
- Died: 28 March 1935 (aged 67); Bournemouth, Hampshire, UK
- Occupation: Architect
- Spouses: Florence (div. 1925) Alma (m. 1925)
- Buildings: British Columbia Parliament Buildings Provincial Courthouse of British Columbia

Francis Mawson Rattenbury (11 October 1867 – 28 March 1935) was a British architect whose career was mostly spent in British Columbia, Canada, where he designed the province's legislative building among other public commissions. Divorced amid scandal, he was murdered in England at the age of 67 by his second wife's lover.

== Architectural career ==
Rattenbury was born in 1867 in Leeds, England. He began his architectural career with an apprenticeship in 1884 to the "Lockwood and Mawson Company" in England, where he worked until he left for Canada. In 1891, he arrived in Vancouver, in the Canadian province of British Columbia.

The province, anxious to show its growing economic, social and political status, was engaged in an architectural competition to build a new legislative building in Victoria. The new immigrant entered, signing his drawings with the pseudonym "A B.C. Architect," and won the competition. Despite many problems, including going over-budget by $400,000, the British Columbia Parliament Buildings were officially opened in 1898. The grand scale of its 500-foot (150 m)-long facade, central dome and two end pavilions, the richness of its white marble, and its use of the then-popular Neo-Romanesque style contributed to its being seen as an impressive monument for the new province. Rattenbury's success in the competition garnered him many commissions in Victoria and other parts of the province, including additions to the Legislative Buildings in 1913–1915. In 1900 he was commissioned to design the 18 bedroom, three story Burns Manor in Calgary for his close friend Pat Burns.

He designed Paardeburg Gate (1901), a memorial to South African war soldiers opposite the Legislative Buildings, 1901.

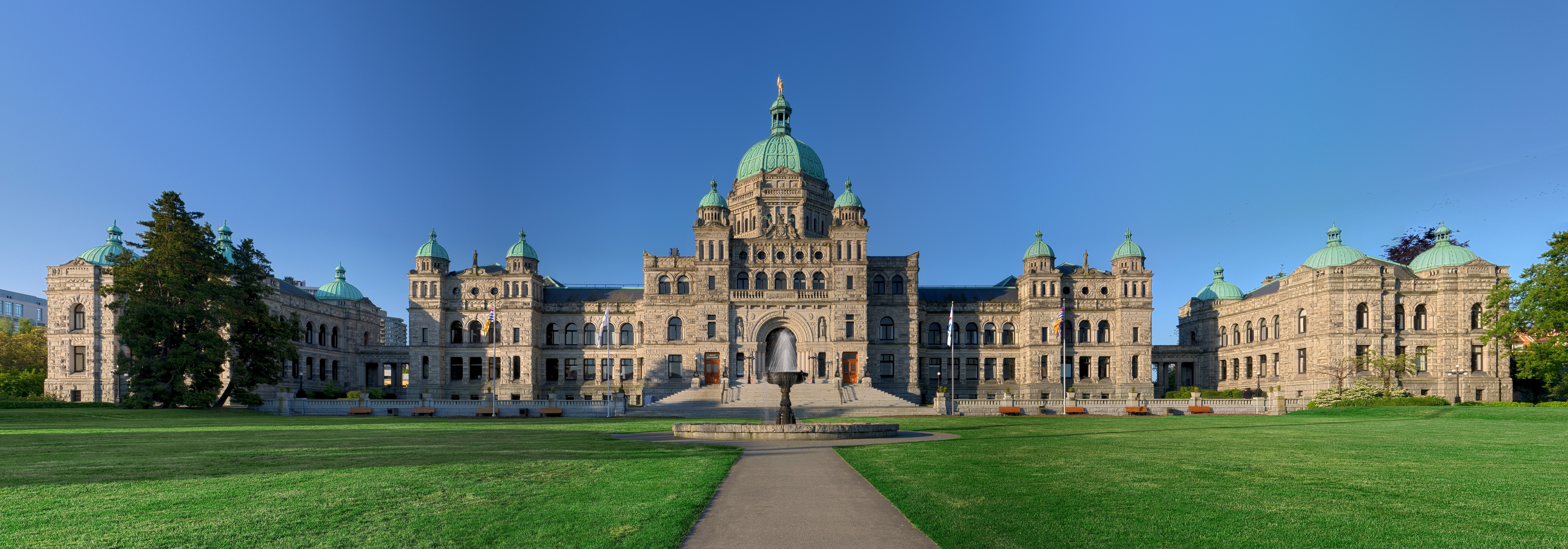
Rattenbury's Parliament Building, Victoria, Canada

Rattenbury worked for the Canadian Pacific Railway as their Western Division Architect. His best known work for the CPR was a Chateau-style hotel, The Empress, which was built in 1904–1908 in Victoria, with two wings added in 1909–1914. The architect, however, fell out with the CPR and then joined their competition, the Grand Trunk Pacific Railway. He designed many hotels and stations for the GTP, but they were never completed because of the death of the president, Charles Melville Hays, in the sinking of the RMS Titanic and the company's subsequent bankruptcy. The largest of these would have been the Château Prince Rupert. The CPR allowed him to return, however, and he built the second CPR Steamship Terminal in Victoria in 1923–1924 in association with another architect, Percy James. Rattenbury and James also collaborated in the design of the Crystal Garden at the same time although they later had a public conflict over Rattenbury's refusal to give James credit and payment for his work on the Garden.

Just as quickly as he became popular, Rattenbury and his architecture fell out of favour. Perhaps a symptom of his waning popularity, he lost the competition to build the Saskatchewan Legislative Building, built 1908–1912 in Regina, to E. and W.S. Maxwell, two Montreal architects trained at the École des Beaux-Arts in Paris. In contrast to the Maxwells, Rattenbury had no formal training in architecture, and with increasing professionalism, he was soon outpaced by better-trained and better-educated architects.

== Personal life ==
At 25 years old Rattenbury moved to Vancouver and placed an ad in The Vancouver Daily World announcing his arrival along with the credentials of having been trained by the influential English architect Henry Francis Lockwood (1811–1878), although Lockwood had died when Rattenbury was just 11 years old.

Soon after winning the competition for the Legislative Buildings in Victoria, Rattenbury was involved in a series of financial ventures. He planned to supply meat and cattle to prospectors during the Klondike Gold Rush and he ordered three steam trains to serve the Yukon Territory. The investments eventually became profitable. After World War I, however, his luck turned sour with the failure of some financial speculations, eventually leading to conflicts with his business partners.

His personal life also began to show strains at this time. In 1923, he left his wife Florence Eleanor Nunn, whom he had married in 1898, and his adult children, Frank and Mary, for the 27-year-old, twice-married Alma Pakenham. His maltreatment of Florence, which included having the heating and lights turned off in their home after he moved out and the public flaunting of his affair with Alma, led his former clients and associates to shun him, and the couple soon left Victoria.

He married Alma in 1925 after Florence agreed to his request for divorce. He and Alma returned to Victoria in 1927 with Christopher, her son from her second marriage. There, they had a son of their own, John, before deciding to move to Bournemouth, England, in 1929, the same year that Florence died.

== Murder ==
In Bournemouth, Rattenbury's financial problems continued, causing his relationship with Alma to deteriorate. She began an affair with George Percy Stoner (19 November 1916 – 24 March 2000), their 18-year-old chauffeur. Stoner had been recruited through an advertisement in the Bournemouth Daily Echo and had been living a sheltered, largely-friendless life with his parents before he moved into the Rattenburys' home, the 'Villa Madeira', in Manor Road.

In the early hours of 23 March 1935, Rattenbury was discovered in his sitting room with severe head injuries. He had sustained a series of blows with a carpenter's mallet, the blows savage enough to remove the back of his skull and to cause his false teeth to fall out; he died four days later. His wife confessed, but Stoner admitted to the housekeeper that he had actually carried out the deed. Alma Rattenbury and Stoner were both charged although Alma was to retract her confession after her elder son Christopher visited her in prison. Stoner was convicted and sentenced to death, which was commuted to life imprisonment following the submission to the Home Secretary of a petition signed by over 300,000 people, who felt that the young man had been manipulated into committing murder by the older woman.

Alma, represented by Ewen Montagu, was acquitted of murder and of being an accessory after the fact but committed suicide a few days later on 4 June 1935, stabbing herself with a dagger six times in the chest (three of which penetrated her heart), before throwing herself into the River Stour at Christchurch.

Stoner served only seven years of his sentence since he was released early to join the army and fight in the Second World War. He married in 1944 and fathered a daughter in 1948. He and his wife led "a quiet life" in the Bournemouth area although he briefly attracted the attention of the media again when he was given two years' probation for indecently assaulting a 12-year-old boy in a public toilet in 1990. Stoner died aged 83 at Christchurch Hospital, Dorset, in 2000, having suffered from Alzheimer's disease.

Despite Francis Rattenbury's outstanding career as an architect, he was buried in an unmarked grave in the Wimborne Road Cemetery close to his home in Bournemouth. In 2007, a headstone was erected as a lasting memorial, paid for by a family friend.

== Cultural references ==
- In 1937, playwright and actor Emlyn Williams suggested to producer Alexander Korda the idea of making a film about "the Rattenbury murder case" with actors Laurence Olivier and Merle Oberon. Williams then joined Oberon in the cast of Korda's film I, Claudius instead.
- A television play based on the case, Killer In Close-Up: The Rattenbury Case, written by George F. Kerr and produced by Melbourne television station ABV-2, was broadcast on 18 June 1958.
- The case was the basis of the radio and stage play Cause Célèbre by Sir Terence Rattigan. A British television adaptation of the Rattigan play was produced by Anglia and shown on ITV on 23 August 1987.
- A chamber opera by the composer Tobin Stokes, Rattenbury, based on the architect's fall from grace, was performed in concert in Powell River, British Columbia on 7 April 2016, with Richard Margison as Rattenbury and Kathleen Brett as Alma. A full-scale production was performed in Victoria, the home of Rattenbury's parliament buildings, in 2017.
- The 2014 Sarah Waters' novel The Paying Guests was part inspired by the murder.
- The 2018 novel Our Friends In Berlin by the author Anthony Quinn mentions the trial as part of its historical background.
- Sean O'Connor's 2019 account of the case The Fatal Passion of Alma Rattenbury suggested that the sensational treatment of the murder in the tabloid press was the reason for Rattenbury's suicide shortly after her acquittal.

== Gallery of his work ==
Building	Year Completed	Builder	Style	Location	Image
British Columbia Parliament Buildings home to the Legislative Assembly of British Columbia.	1891–1898, additions 1913–1915	Francis Rattenbury		Victoria, British Columbia	
Empress Hotel	(1904–1908, additions in 1909 and 1914)	Francis Rattenbury		Victoria, British Columbia	
Canadian Pacific Railway Steamship Terminal, Victoria	1924	Francis Rattenbury		Victoria's Inner Harbour; Victoria, British Columbia	
Buntzen No. 2 Power Plant	1912	Francis Rattenbury		Indian Arm, British Columbia	
Burns Manor	1903	Francis Rattenbury		Calgary, Alberta	
Vancouver Art Gallery formerly Court House	(1905–1913, remodelled in 1983)	Francis Rattenbury		Vancouver, British Columbia	
Chateau Lake Louise	additions (1900–1912, burned down in 1924)	Thomas Sorby, Francis Rattenbury		Lake Louise, Banff National Park, Alberta	
Mount Stephen House	additions (1900–1902, dismantled 1963)	Thomas Sorby, Francis Rattenbury	Tudor Revival	Field, British Columbia	
Bank of Montreal	1900	Francis Rattenbury	Normanesque Revival	2004 Columbia Avenue, Rossland, British Columbia	The main bank hall provides a marketplace for Kootenay Creative products known as the Quoynary Canada.

=== List of buildings ===
- Roedde House, Vancouver (1893)
- Nanaimo Court House, Nanaimo (1895)
- Bank of Montreal, Victoria (1896) (now the Irish Times Pub)
- Bank of Montreal, Rossland (1898)
- Bank of Montreal, Nelson (1899)
- Lieutenant Governor's Residence, Victoria (1901, destroyed by fire in 1957)
- Victoria High School (Fort Street location), Victoria (1901, demolished in 1953)
- Phoenix Hospital, Phoenix (1901, demolished)
- Burns Manor (1903)
- Janet Clay House, Victoria (1904)
- Merchant's Bank, Victoria (1907)
- Court House, Nelson (Designed 1903, completed November 1908, supervising local architect, Alexander Carrie)
- Château Prince Rupert (unexecuted)
- Pacific Railway Steamship Terminal, Victoria (1923–1924)
- Crystal Garden, Victoria (1925)
- Merchants Bank, Nanaimo (1909–1911) (now The Vault Cafe)
