= Charles Melville Hays =

American businessman (1858–1912)

- Charles Melville Hays
- Born: May 16, 1856; Rock Island, Illinois, United States
- Died: April 15, 1912 (aged 55); North Atlantic Ocean
- Occupation: Railway executive
- Title: President of the Grand Trunk Railway
- Spouse: Clara Jennings Gregg (m. 1881)
- Children: 4

Charles Melville Hays (May 16, 1856 – April 15, 1912) was the president of the Grand Trunk Railway. He began working in the railroad business as a clerk at the age of 17 and quickly rose through the ranks of management to become the General Manager of the Wabash, St. Louis and Pacific Railway. He became vice-president of that company in 1889 and remained as such until 1896 when he became General Manager of the Grand Trunk Railway (GTR) of Canada.

Hays left GTR for a short time to serve as the President of the Southern Pacific Railway Company but returned to GTR after one year. As Vice-president and General Manager of GTR he is credited with keeping the company from bankruptcy. In 1909, he became the president of GTR and all its consolidated lines, subsidiary railroads, and steamship companies. He was known for his philanthropy and received the Order of the Rising Sun, third class, from the Emperor of Japan in 1907.

Hays is credited with the formation of the Grand Trunk Pacific Railway (GTP), a plan he had to create a second transcontinental railroad within the borders of Canada. He is also blamed for the insolvency of both the GTR and the GTP. He died in the sinking of the RMS Titanic before his plan was complete. Before the ship collided with an iceberg, Hays said that in the near future there would be "the greatest ... of all disasters at sea." His body was recovered, and he was buried in Montreal. He had a wife and four daughters.

== Early life ==
Charles Melville Hays was born in Rock Island, Illinois, on May 16, 1856. His family moved to St. Louis, Missouri, when he was a child.

== Career ==
In 1873, at the age of 17, he began his career in the railroad business working for the Atlantic and Pacific Railroad in St. Louis. From 1877 to 1884, Hays was Secretary to the General Manager of the Missouri Pacific Railroad. Beginning in 1884, he held the same position with the Wabash, St. Louis and Pacific Railway until 1886, when he became that company's General Manager. In 1889, he became vice-president of the Wabash Railroad and remained as such until 1896, when he became General Manager of the Grand Trunk Railway (GTR) of Canada.

In 1901, Hays left GTR to serve as the President of the Southern Pacific Railway Company but returned to the company in January 1902 as vice-president and General Manager. In October 1909, he was appointed president of GTR, which also gave him control of its subsidiary railroad and steamship companies. These included the Central Vermont Railway, the Grand Trunk Western Railway, the Grand Haven and Milwaukee Railway, the Detroit and Toledo Shoreline Railroad, the Toledo, Saginaw and Muskegon Railway, the Southern New England Railway Company, the Canadian Express Company, and several others. In addition, he was sought after to help manage several philanthropies. He was Governor of the Royal Victoria Hospital, Montreal, Montreal General Hospital and McGill University. He received the Order of the Rising Sun, third class, from the Emperor of Japan in 1907 for assistance he gave the Imperial Government Railways.

When Hays became General Manager of GTR in 1896, it was near bankruptcy and under-performing its rival, the Canadian Pacific Railway (CPR). On the advice of American financier J. Pierpont Morgan, the GTR board selected Hays as General Manager to bring more aggressive, "American" business practices to the company. He reorganized the management of the company and successfully negotiated running rights with CPR. He also brought more efficiency to the handling of accounts, built new track and ordered more powerful locomotives. These changes produced an era of greater success for the railroad.

== Transcontinental Railway ==
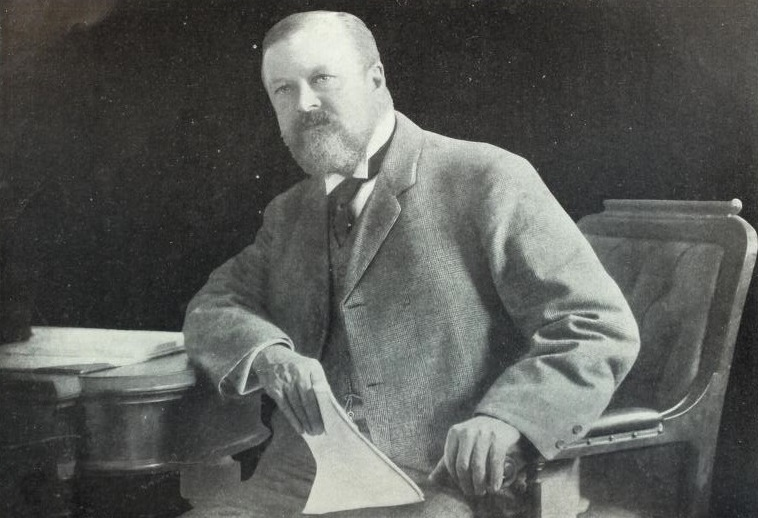
Charles Melville Hays.

At the time, the western prairies were being rapidly settled. Hays wanted to capitalize on the trend by constructing a transcontinental railroad, within the borders of Canada, to run 3,600 miles from Moncton, New Brunswick, to Prince Rupert, British Columbia. In 1900, he introduced a proposal to extend the lines of the Grand Trunk Western, an American subsidiary, from Chicago to Winnipeg, "and thence to the Pacific." However, he was turned down by the railroad's directors in London. Later that year, Hays left GTR to work for Southern Pacific, but a change in ownership there lead to his resignation. He returned to the GTR to find that the president, Sir Charles Rivers Wilson, had convinced the board of directors to pursue the transcontinental railway. Meanwhile, the government, under Sir Wilfrid Laurier, had also decided to back the project. Plans to construct the transcontinental line were announced on November 24, 1902.

Hays's plan involved the creation of a subsidiary line from Winnipeg to Prince Rupert, with the government building the line from New Brunswick to Winnipeg. The cabinet became weary of Hays's demands for subsidies, but after negotiations between the government and Hays, aided by the railroad's president Rivers Wilson, the National Transcontinental Railway Act was passed in 1903. It enabled the incorporation of the Grand Trunk Pacific Railway (GTP). The government's portion of the line would be called the National Transcontinental Railway (NTR).

There were problems with some of Hays's policies regarding the GTP.

- Firstly, he had planned to buy out the Canadian Northern Railway (CNoR), but the company resisted and instead provided competition.
- Secondly, Hays lacked support from the board of directors in London; he wanted to link the GTR with the GTP, but the board would not back this plan. He thus proceeded on his own authority, making commitments that would ultimately ruin both the GTP and the GTR.
- Thirdly, Hays faced opposition to his choice of Prince Rupert, on Kaien Island, B.C., for the western terminal, because there was not much traffic there. Hays preferred the location as he believed it would provide a shorter route for transshipment to destinations in Asia.

Hays made the construction of the mainline his priority, failing to develop feeder lines. CNoR and CPR joined forces to gain control of the prairie traffic. The competition among the three railroads led to Canada's ending up with three transcontinental railways instead of one. This was to result in the GTP's being starved of traffic; even though it was arguably the best of the three, it ultimately failed to attract enough freight to make it profitable.

After construction on the GTP began in 1905, Hays started the Grand Trunk Pacific Development Company in order to purchase thousands of acres of land on which he established town sites along the route of the railway, including Melville, Saskatchewan, which was named after him. Hays's vision went beyond the building of the railway. He also had plans for a fleet of ocean liners and a string of resort hotels across the Rocky Mountains. He hired the famed architect Francis Rattenbury from CPR to design a grand hotel, the Château Prince Rupert, at the westernmost stop on the railway. In 1909, only 3000 people lived in Prince Rupert, but anticipation of the railroad caused it to grow rapidly, despite the rapidly rising cost of property and the muddy environs. The city was incorporated in 1910.

After Rivers Wilson retired as the railroad's president in 1909, Hays was appointed to fill the position. By 1910, Grand Trunk union workers were demanding wages on par with those of railroad workers in the United States. A strike put a stop to construction. Hays finally gave into the workers' demands but failed to re-hire 250 previously fired strikers despite promising to do so. He also denied workers their pensions, causing one member of Parliament to describe him as "heartless, cruel, and tyrannical."

By 1912, the cost of constructing the railway was increasing, with rising wages and price increases on materials, while the government refused to allow a rate increase. Another reason for the mounting costs was Hays's insistence on "building to the very highest standards". Meanwhile, CNoR and CPR monopolized the traffic in the west. In addition, Grand Trunk, which would be leasing the NTR from the government, was responsible for paying back the construction cost of that line. Hays began to fear insolvency.

== RMS Titanic ==
In April 1912, Hays was in London soliciting financial support for the GTP. He was anxious to get back to Canada for the opening of the Château Laurier in Ottawa, Ontario, named after Prime Minister Laurier. The gala opening of this hotel was set for April 25, 1912. Hays had also received news that his daughter Louise was having difficulty with her pregnancy.

Additionally, he might have had business with J. Bruce Ismay, chairman of the White Star Line; in any case, Ismay had invited Hays to join him on the RMS Titanic. Hays, his wife, Clara, his daughter, Orian (see source note), his son-in-law, Thornton Davidson (son of Charles Peers Davidson), his secretary, Mr. Vivian Payne, and a maid, Miss Mary Anne Perreault, shared a deluxe suite (cabin B69) on B Deck, also known as the Bridge Deck.

At 11:40 pm on April 14, 1912, Titanic struck an iceberg. Hays helped the women in his party into one of the ship's 20 lifeboats, but he, his son-in-law, and his secretary remained and perished when the ship sank, along with nearly 1,500 other Titanic passengers and crew. Hays was reported to have made a prophetic remark on the evening of the disaster; deploring the way the steamship lines were competing to win passengers with ever-faster vessels, he is said to have commented, "The time will come soon when this trend will be checked by some appalling disaster."

Some early sources, aware that one of the Hays daughters (Orian Davidson) was accompanying her parents, misidentified the daughter as "Margaret Hays", who was actually a totally unrelated young woman, traveling with two female friends. Early newspaper reports incorrectly stated that Clara and Margaret Hays, and Mrs. Thornton [Orian] Davidson disembarked the rescue ship in New York City together and boarded a train for Montreal,

=== Death ===
Hays was a victim of the Titanic. Hays's body was recovered from the waters of the North Atlantic by the CS Minia, and he was buried at Mount Royal Cemetery in Montreal. Two funerals were held for him on May 8, one at the American Presbyterian Church in Montreal, the other in London at the Church of St Edmund, King and Martyr.

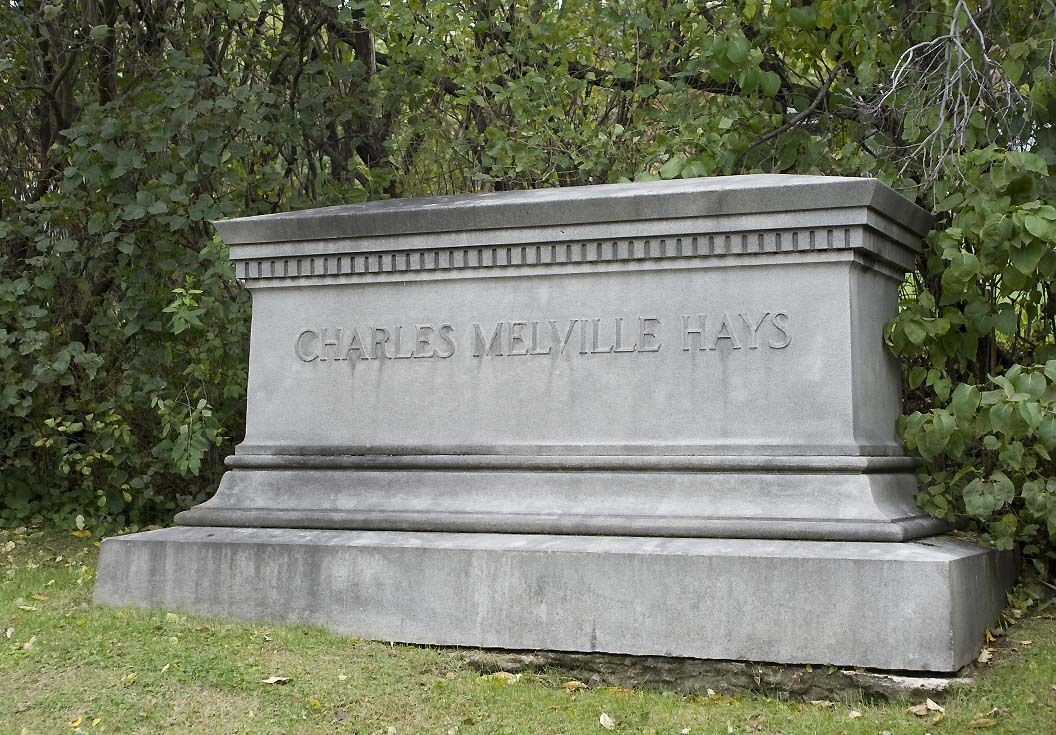
C.M. Hays's tombstone in Montreal

== Legacy ==
Hays died before he could see the GTP completed. He was eulogized as one of the greatest railwaymen in Canada, and work on the GTR was stopped for five minutes, on April 25, 1912, in his memory. The period in which Hays led the GTR was its most prosperous era.

However, his policies led to the GTP's collapse in 1919. The company was placed in receivership, and the government seized GTR's stock. It was later alleged that Hays had deceived the company's London directors in 1903 by committing them to conditions in the railway's agreements with the Canadian government for the building of the GTP to which they did not agree. That scheme was blamed for the company's collapse.

The railroad car in which his body was transported back to Montreal is preserved at the Canadian Railway Museum, near Delson, Quebec. There is a statue of him in Prince Rupert, and the city of Melville, Saskatchewan, is named after him, as is the village of Haysport, British Columbia. Mount Hays, south of Prince Rupert, British Columbia is named for him.

Charles Hays Secondary School in Prince Rupert is also named in his honour.

== Personal life ==
His wife was Clara Jennings Hays (née Gregg), whom he married in St. Louis, Missouri on October 13, 1881. They had four daughters: Orian (who married Thornton Davidson, and later Robert Newmarch Hickson), Clara (who married Hope Castle Scott), Marjorie (who married George Duffield Hall), and Louise (who married a Mr. Arthur Harold Grier).

Preceded by Charles Rivers Wilson	President of the Grand Trunk Railway; 1910–1912	Succeeded by Edson Joseph Chamberlin
