= Preston and Berlin Railway =

History of the Preston and Berlin railway, in Ontario, Canada

Overview
- Main region(s): Preston; Berlin (now Kitchener)
- Stations called at: Berlin; German Mills; Doon; Preston
- Parent company: Galt and Guelph Railway; Great Western Railway
- Locale: Waterloo County, Midwestern Ontario, Canada
- Dates of operation: 1857–1858
- Successor: Grand Trunk Railway Galt Branch; CN Waterloo Subdivision; CN Huron Park Spur

Technical
- Track gauge: 1,435 mm (4 ft 8 1/2 in) standard gauge
- Length: 9.7 miles (15.6 km)

The first Preston and Berlin Railway was a steam-operated railway, opened for operation in 1857. Berlin, Ontario (now Kitchener, Ontario), and Preston, Ontario (now part of Cambridge, Ontario), were only 13 kilometres (8.1 mi) apart, but the route required a bridge over the Grand River.

Berlin's city council awarded the line a subsidy.

The line operated for just three months. Ice flowing down the Grand River damaged piers of its bridge at Doon, Ontario.

The bridge never re-opened.

There were recriminations over the line's failure, and the satisfaction of those who inspected the line, and its bridge. Eventually, in 1863, an act in Canada's Parliament exonerated Berlin City Council. Edward Irving Ferguson acquired the line's assets, because he had held a mortgage on some of the line's property. He sold those assets to the Grand Trunk Railway, on November 14, 1865.

The 6.9 miles (11.1 km) from Berlin, to the Grand River, at Doon, was incorporated into a route the Grand Trunk built from Berlin to Galt, Ontario.

== See also ==
- Preston and Berlin Street Railway
- Grand River Railway
- Great Western Railway (Ontario)
- List of Ontario railways
