= Galt, Preston and Hespeler Street Railway =

Former street railway in Cambridge, Ontario, Canada

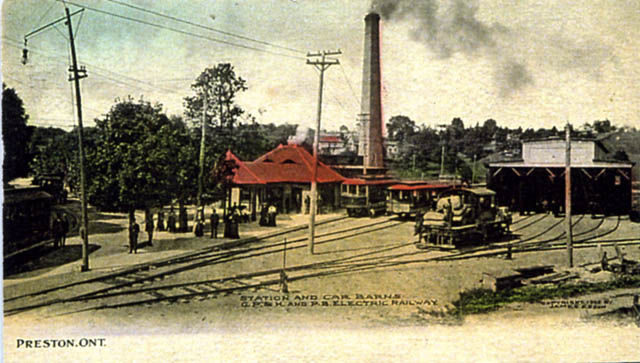
- The GP&H car barn and union station with the Preston and Berlin Street Railway in Preston.

Overview
- Reporting mark: GP&H
- Locale: Waterloo County, Ontario, Canada
- Dates of operation: 1894–1908
- Predecessor: Galt and Preston Street Railway
- Successor: Berlin, Waterloo, Wellesley, and Lake Huron Railway

Technical
- Track gauge: 1,435 mm (4 ft 8 1/2 in) standard gauge
- Electrification: Overhead 600 V DC

The Galt, Preston and Hespeler Street Railway (GP&H) was an interurban electric street railway connecting the three nearby communities of Galt, Preston, and later Hespeler in Waterloo County (now Waterloo Region), Ontario, Canada. The firm was organized in 1890, and began operation in 1894. In 1908 it merged with the Preston and Berlin Street Railway, with the new entity called the Berlin, Waterloo, Wellesley, and Lake Huron Railway Company.

In 1911, the line reached Hespeler, Berlin (now Kitchener), and Waterloo. In 1914, the company was incorporated as the Grand River Railway. By 1916, the line was extended to Brantford/Port Dover.

== See also ==
- Preston and Berlin Street Railway
- Grand River Railway
- Galt Subdivision
- Kitchener and Waterloo Street Railway
- List of street railways in Canada
- List of Ontario railways
- List of defunct Canadian railways
