= Preston and Berlin Street Railway =

Former street railway in Waterloo Region, Ontario, Canada

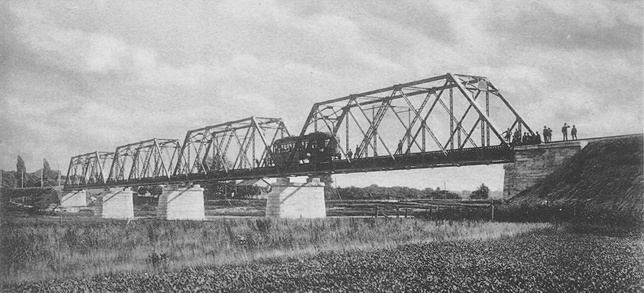
- Freeport Bridge, c. 1905.

Overview
- Main regions: Berlin (now Kitchener); Preston; Waterloo
- Reporting mark: P&B
- Locale: Waterloo County, Midwestern Ontario, Canada
- Dates of operation: 1904–1908 (or 1914)
- Successor: Berlin, Waterloo, Wellesley, and Lake Huron Railway; Grand River Railway

Technical
- Track gauge: 1,435 mm (4 ft 8 1/2 in) standard gauge
- Electrification: 600 V DC overhead
- Length: 30 km (19 mi)

The Preston and Berlin Street Railway (or Preston and Berlin Electric Street Railway) was an interurban electric street railway which served the 12.68 kilometres (7.88 mi) between what were then the towns of Preston (now part of Cambridge) and Berlin (renamed Kitchener) in Midwestern Ontario, Canada. The company was formed in 1894, but lay dormant until 1900, when construction finally began. The company began operation in 1904.

== History ==
=== Steam railways ===
==== East–west railways ====
Railways appeared in Waterloo County, Ontario in the mid- to late-19th century. These railways were steam-powered, and primarily followed an east–west orientation, each connecting Toronto with the London and St. Thomas area via different means: the Great Western Railway's southerly mainline through Harrisburg and Paris, which opened in 1853; the Grand Trunk Railway's original northerly mainline through the county town of Berlin (later Kitchener), which opened in 1856; and the Credit Valley Railway's third, more central line through Galt, which formally opened in 1879. With the merger of the Great Western Railway under the Grand Trunk, the first two lines came under the same ownership, while in 1883 the third came under the ownership of the Canadian Pacific Railway.

The area suffered, however, for north–south connections. The Great Western began work on a branch line from Harrisburg to Galt even before the mainline through Harrisburg was complete; the branch opened a year after the mainline did, in 1854. It ambitiously advanced further up the Grand River valley, chartering the Galt and Guelph Railway Company (Galt to Guelph via Preston, Hespeler, and Glenchristie) in 1852 and the Preston and Berlin Railway Company (Preston to Berlin via Doon and German Mills) in 1857.

==== Preston and Berlin Railway ====
The Preston and Berlin Railway was the first major attempt at a rail connection between the two towns. They both sat along the route of the "Great Road" leading roughly northwest from Dundas, and nearby the Huron Road which ultimately led to Goderich and which opened in 1828. With relatively few bridges across the Grand River and Speed River, crossing places had significance and attracted settlers who built inns and shops to take advantage of stagecoach traffic. Preston was an early centre in the area, and the town had built a bridge across the Grand River to promote trade with the area to the west. This made it a de facto point of entry for settler groups such as Mennonites from Lancaster County, Pennsylvania who would later spread out through the Waterloo County area. Some of these settlers remained, such as John Erb, on whose land the town of Preston was mainly built.

Across the Grand River and to the north, the settlement of Ebytown had been founded by the Mennonite Bishop Benjamin Eby. This started with the construction of a meeting house and schoolhouse in the 1810s, which were soon replaced by larger community structures in the 1830s. Eby encouraged manufacturing in the village, and it soon became a regional centre which was renamed Berlin. By the mid-1850s, its growth had accelerated, with more industrial development, a rapidly increasing population, the status of county seat of Waterloo County, and the Grand Trunk Railway mainline having been run just to the north of its downtown.

A set tri-weekly stagecoach and mail route between the two settlements existed as early as 1835, running between Preston and Waterloo, the latter of which had gotten a post office in 1831; Berlin was along the route. The mail route was extended to Woolwich by 1837, with a "by-office" in Berlin. Berlin finally got its own post office in 1842.

The Preston and Berlin Railway closely followed existing routes between the two centres, passing through the mill towns of Doon and German Mills. Taking advantage of the waterpower available from the creeks flowing through these hilly areas, industries had developed in the early- to mid-19th century, which would be potential freight customers for the railway. In theory a short distance of only 13 kilometres (8.1 mi), a route which was noted by contemporary travellers as sometimes difficult for roadway traffic proved circuitous and steep for railways. The resulting 9.7-mile (15.6 km) route had twenty-two curves, some as sharp as eight degrees.

The railway initially opened in November 1857 without incident, running passenger trains on revenue service, with a 40-minute timetabled travel time between Berlin and Preston. By January, however, the Great Western was threatening to close the line due to unprofitability. In February 1858, disaster struck when the key infrastructural element to the line, the bridge over the Grand River, was washed out. Service along the line was immediately suspended, and the Great Western became embroiled in a legal dispute with the town of Berlin over an annual subsidy, which the town would not pay for a railway which was not operational. This dispute was only resolved in 1863 by an act of Canadian parliament, which absolved the town of its duty to have paid the subsidy for the period being disputed. Two years later, the entire Preston and Berlin Railway, whose upper stretch was no longer accessible from the Great Western mainline, was deeded to the Grand Trunk Railway.

The Grand Trunk did not immediately restore service to the line, and in 1871, a bylaw was passed in Galt which authorized a $25,000 expenditure for Grand Trunk service to be extended to the town. The Grand Trunk line extension held to the west bank of the Grand River, bypassing Preston entirely. This left Preston without rail service aside from the Great Western's Galt and Guelph Railway line.

=== Street railway development ===
Preston's fortunes began to improve again in 1890, when the Galt and Preston Street Railway (G&PSR, or G&P) was incorporated. This would become the second street railway system in Waterloo County, opening about six years after the Berlin and Waterloo Street Railway (later the Kitchener and Waterloo Street Railway) did; however, it was the first electric one. Interest arose in restoring the rail connection between Preston and Berlin, and a company was incorporated for this purpose in 1894. It would be years before construction began on a line, however, and in the meantime, a Hespeler branch of the G&P was constructed, transforming the G&P into the GP&H, or Galt, Preston and Hespeler Street Railway.

Between 1894 and 1902, "little if anything was actually accomplished towards the construction of the proposed [Preston and Berlin line]." In 1900, rights were signed away to the Hamilton Radial Electric Railway Company in an initiative proposed by John Patterson, the president of the company, who had connections to the Dominion Power and Transmission Company of Hamilton. In 1902, however, work actually began on the line. This started with laying of track near Albert Street (now Madison Avenue) in Kitchener, near the Berlin and Waterloo Street Railway's southern car barns and end of track. Work proceeded east along King Street until it reached Freeport, after which it began at the other end of the line in Preston. In March 1903, the Hamilton Radial Electric Railway Company transferred the franchise and other rights back to the Preston and Berlin Street Railway Company. Later that year, in August, the Town of Berlin authorized the construction of a freight line leaving King Street and following Türk, Park, Wilmot, and Victoria streets. Meanwhile, the bridge over the Grand River at Freeport was constructed during the winter of 1903–04, and the line's electrical system (which operated at 600 V DC) was set up in the summer of 1904, along with a powerhouse at Preston Junction, where the Preston and Berlin met the GP&H tracks. The power house used steam boilers to generate electricity, along with a 300 KW Canadian General Electric generator.

=== Operations ===
On 6 October 1904, the line finally opened to passenger traffic. Freight traffic was slow to follow, only beginning in 1905 after the completion of remaining freight tracks around Preston, as well as the freight terminal at Linden Avenue and Joseph Street in Berlin. The Preston and Berlin's entry into Waterloo caused a brief railway war. Local industrialist Joseph Seagram, the owner of a major distillery, opportunistically supported the Preston and Berlin against the Grand Trunk. Grand Trunk crews attempted to physically prevent construction crews from completing the Preston and Berlin freight line through to Erb Street in Waterloo, but were defeated when the Waterloo municipal fire department became involved. On a wider scale, the conflict resulted in an agreement between the Grand Trunk and the Canadian Pacific Railway, the latter of which was seen as an invisible influence in the conflict. This was to the effect that the Canadian Pacific would not enter the Kitchener or Waterloo freight markets.

Ultimately, the local electric railways proved a tempting acquisition, especially given their propensity to undercut Grand Trunk freight service. The Canadian Pacific had been expanding its influence in the area for decades through covert proxies and intermediaries, but in 1908, both the Preston and Berlin Street Railway and the Galt, Preston, and Hespeler Street Railway were suddenly merged under a new entity called the Berlin, Waterloo, Wellesley, and Lake Huron Railway (BWW&LH), which was leased to Canadian Pacific for a period of 99 years. The BWW&LH was framed by promoters around lofty goals of constructing further lines to the north, but retrospectively, researchers such as Peter Cain argued that it simply functioned as a vehicle to further Canadian Pacific's ambitions.

In 1914, the BWW&LH was effectively rebranded to the Grand River Railway, and greater attempts were made to consolidate the P&B and GP&H systems on a technical and operational level.

=== Legacy ===
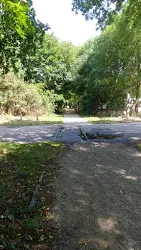
A fragment of remaining rails on the former 1905 freight cutoff right of way, which has been converted to rail trail.

The Preston and Berlin Railway would continue to operate for decades under a succession of management schemes, becoming increasingly integrated with neighbouring electric railways as it did so. In 1931, Canadian Pacific began to assert more direct control and ownership over the electric lines in the area, managing both the Grand River Railway and another related line, the Lake Erie and Northern Railway, under a single subsidiary, the Canadian Pacific Electric Lines, a mirror of the Canadian National Electric Railways started by the successor of its old adversary, the Grand Trunk. The Preston and Berlin line built in the first few years of the 20th century began to change drastically, as municipal politicians in Berlin (renamed Kitchener in 1916) began to oppose the private street railway operations in downtown areas, in favour of automobile traffic as well as the recently municipalized Kitchener and Waterloo Street Railway. Under Canadian Pacific-guided infrastructure upgrades, the Grand River Railway switched to 1500 V DC operations, as well as larger passenger cars and an increasing emphasis on freight. This led to a divorcing of the municipal and Canadian Pacific-owned systems, and the surrendering of old P&B trackage along King Street in Berlin, along with abandonment of the original freight line cutoff in favour of a newer cutoff further to the south, at what would become Kitchener Junction.

While passenger service was maintained through to the 1950s, after many Canadian interurbans had begun to shut down, Canadian Pacific began to campaign aggressively for permission to abandon passenger service and to use the line exclusively for freight. This succeeded in 1955, leading to a total abandonment on passenger service along the line and replacement by Canadian Pacific Transport Company motor coach service. During the 1960s, the new freight line was itself abandoned in favour of an even more southerly line far away from downtown, as part of a general municipal plan in Kitchener for a greenfield development of new industrial parks, residential subdivisions, and the Fairview Park Mall south of Highway 8. By the 1990s, Canadian Pacific began to abandon the freight line through the west end of Berlin to Waterloo altogether, in favour of an interchange yard with CN Rail, which had abandoned the southern part of the original Preston and Berlin Railway line in the 1960s. In 1997, parts of the Canadian Pacific right of way were reused for the Iron Horse Trail, a multi-use urban rail trail running from Uptown Waterloo south through much of Kitchener.

== See also ==
- Galt, Preston and Hespeler Street Railway
- Preston and Berlin Railway
- Grand River Railway
- Kitchener and Waterloo Street Railway
- List of street railways in Canada
- List of Ontario railways
