= Kitchener and Waterloo Street Railway =

Former street railway in Waterloo Region, Ontario, Canada

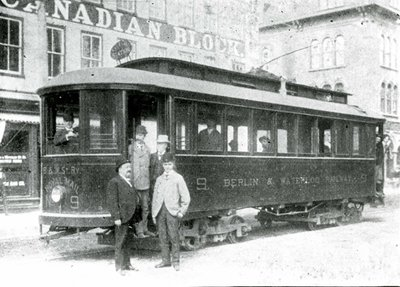
- Streetcar photographed on King Street at King and Ontario in front of the Canadian Block building.

Operation
- Locale: Kitchener and Waterloo, Ontario, Canada
- Open: 1888
- Close: 1946 (replaced by trolleybus service)
- Status: Closed
- Lines: 1
Horsecar era: 1888–89–1895
Owner(s)	Berlin and Waterloo Street Railway Company
Track gauge	?
Propulsion system	Horse-drawn
Depot(s)	Corner of King Street and Cedar (now Bridgeport) Street, Waterloo
Stock	2 horsecars
Route length	Cedar Street in Waterloo to Scott Street in Kitchener
Early electrification era: 1895–1906
Owner(s)	Berlin and Waterloo Street Railway Company
Propulsion system	Electricity
Depot(s)	Corner of Albert (now Madison) Street and King Street in Berlin starting in 1900
Route length	Extended to Albert (now Madison) Street and King Street in Berlin starting in 1900
Municipalization era: 1906–1946
Owner(s)	1906–12: Town of Berlin; 1912–16: City of Berlin; 1916–46: City of Kitchener
Operator	Kitchener Public Utilities Commission
Propulsion system	Electricity
Depot(s)	1923–46: Car barns at Kitchener Junction station
Stock	1906: 8 electric trams, 8 trailers

The Kitchener and Waterloo Street Railway was a street railway in Berlin (renamed Kitchener) and Waterloo in Waterloo County, Ontario, Canada. Horsecar service began in 1888 under the original Berlin and Waterloo Street Railway name and continued until the system was electrified in 1895, when the existing horsecars were converted for electric service. This proved ineffective, and the company suffered from under-investment. In 1896, a local consortium bought out the company and purchased a new fleet of purpose-built electric trams. The system was municipalized in 1907 and was run by the Town (later City) of Berlin/Kitchener until the end of service. The railway was renamed in 1919 to reflect the name change of the City of Kitchener, which had occurred in 1916. In 1927, it was reorganized under the Kitchener Public Utilities Commission, which continued operations until 1946, when streetcar service was discontinued and replaced with trolleybus service.

== Construction and horsecar era ==
The street railway originated with the chartering of the Berlin and Waterloo Street Railway Company in 1886. There were considerable delays in the construction of the line, however, and the local holders of the charter made the decision to sell the company to an American consortium. The American consortium appointed a single man, Thomas M. Burt of Boston, as simultaneously president, treasurer, and manager of the railway while he supervised construction. The Town of Waterloo had passed an amended bylaw setting the date for the start of construction at 1 July 1888, so on 30 June, the ceremonial first spikes were driven by the mayors of Berlin and Waterloo. At the time, the deferred completion date was 1 August 1889, but the line was largely complete by 13 June, when the first streetcar crossed the Grand Trunk Railway tracks in Berlin and went as far to the south as Scott Street. When the 2.5-mile (4.0 km) line was opened, it ran along King Street from the Berlin Town Hall at Scott Street north to Cedar Street in Waterloo, with a spur running along Water Street to the Berlin Grand Trunk Railway station.

Typically of streetcar systems, very light rail was laid, with 27-lb. rail used for paved sections, and 30-lb. rail used for dirt road. The railway operated out of a car barn and stables at the north end of the line at Cedar Street in Waterloo. A year into its operations, the railway owned eight cars and seventeen horses. The small street railway had opened in the twilight of the horsecar years, however, as the street railway in Windsor had opened in 1886 with electrified streetcars from the beginning, and Toronto street railways began electrifying in 1891.

== Electrification ==
The company had little ability to finance electrification, which took over two years to complete, from March 1893 to May 1895, and also involved bonding the rails and reballasting the track. An electric power contract was negotiated with the Berlin Gas Company, beginning a long relationship between these two companies which ultimately would lead to their merger into a single organization. Three of the old horse cars were fitted with electric motors and used as electric streetcars, with the first electrically-powered run occurring on 18 May 1895.

The driver of the horsecars was Henry U. Clemens, who estimated that they transported about 400 people per day, carrying 10-15 passengers per car from a first southbound trip at 6:40 am to a final northbound trip arriving at Waterloo at 10:20 pm.

== Legacy ==
Though the tracks were largely removed in the 1950s, some physical remnants of the streetcar line survived until the 2010s, when wooden ties were discovered during excavations on King Street to prepare for the construction of the ION light rail system.

== See also ==
- Grand River Railway
- Grand River Transit
- List of defunct Canadian railways
- List of Ontario railways
- List of street railways in Canada
- Preston and Berlin Street Railway
- Urban rail transit in Canada
- Streetcars in North America
- Public transport in Canada
