= Preston, Ontario =

Neighbourhood in Cambridge, Ontario, Canada

Preston
- Neighbourhood
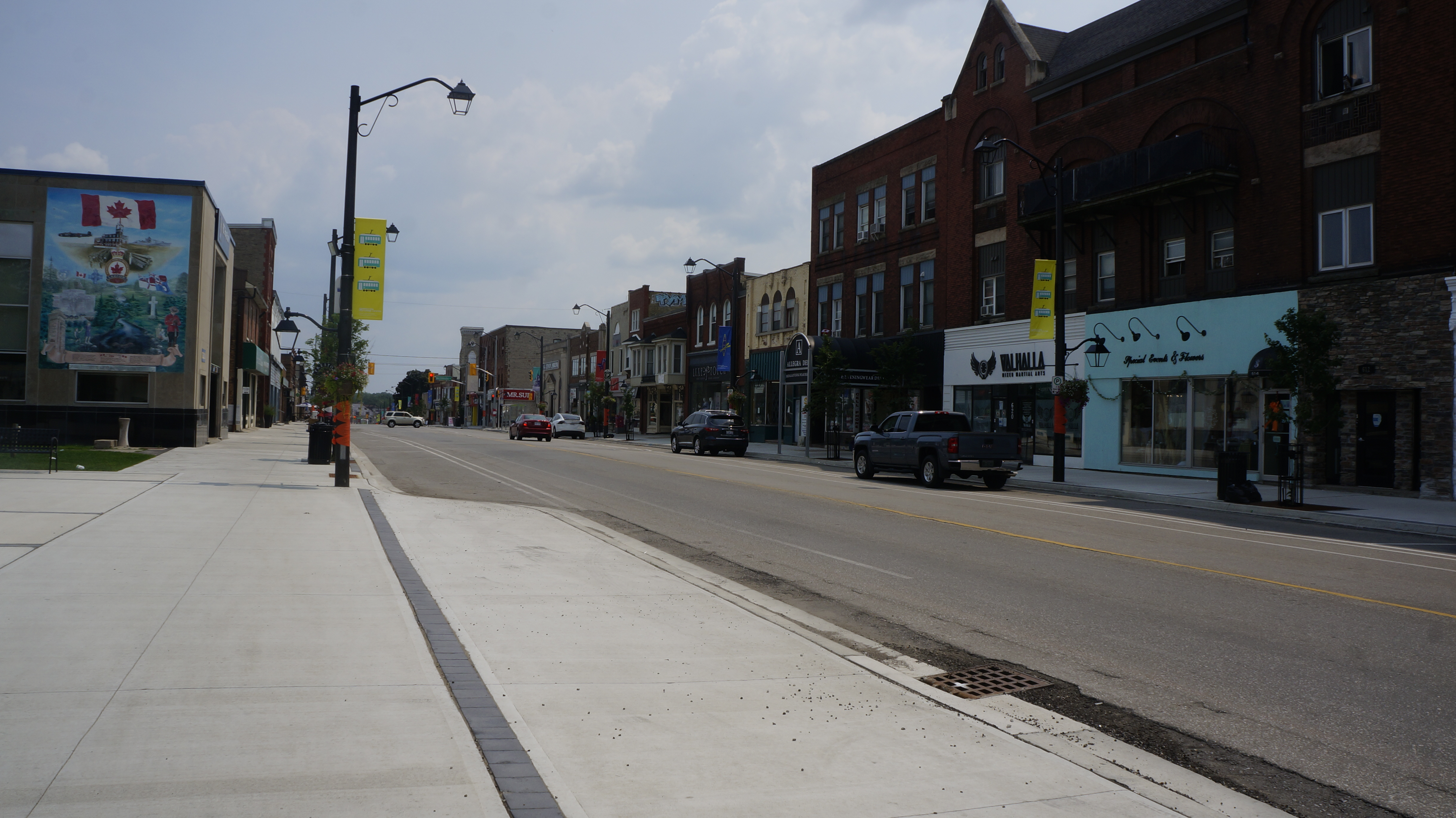
- Preston Downtown

- Location within Regional Municipality of Waterloo Location within Southern Ontario
- Coordinates: 43°23′29″N 80°20′55″W
- Country: Canada
- Province: Ontario
- Regional municipality: Waterloo
- City: Cambridge
- Settled: 1805
- Incorporated (town): 1900
- Amalgamated (city): 1973
- Time zone: UTC-5 (EST)
  - Summer (DST): UTC-4 (EDT)
- Forward sortation area: N1R, N1S, N1T, N3C, N3H
- Area codes: 519 and 226
- NTS Map: 040P08
- GNBC Code: FCIKJ

Preston is a community in Cambridge, Ontario, Canada in the Regional Municipality of Waterloo, Ontario. Prior to 1973 it was an independent town, incorporated in 1915, but amalgamation with the town of Hespeler, Ontario, the city of Galt, Ontario and the village of Blair formed the new municipality of Cambridge. Parts of the surrounding townships were also included. No population data is available for the former Preston since the Census reports cover only the full area of Cambridge, though the combined population of the census tracts covering the majority of Preston reported a population of 20,008 as of the 2016 Canada Census. The first mayor of Cambridge was Claudette Millar.

There was considerable resistance among the local population to this "shotgun marriage" arranged by the provincial government and a healthy sense of rivalry had always governed relations among the three communities. Even today, many residents refer to their area of Cambridge as being Galt or Preston or Hespeler. Each unique centre has its own history that is well documented in the Cambridge City Archives.

The former Preston is located on the western side of the city at the confluence of the Grand River and Speed River. Downtown Preston is commonly considered to be bounded on the north by the entrance to Riverside Park on King Street, and on the south by the King and Bishop plaza.

== History ==
Preston was originally formed on land belonging to the German Company Tract, along the Speed River, which was purchased earlier from the Six Nations Indians. The massive territory of the Tract had been purchased from Richard Beasley who had acquired it from the British Crown in the late 1700s.

The name Preston is named for the hometown of William Scollick, who was surveyor and a native of Preston, Lancashire in England.

In the 1800s a group of German-speaking Mennonites from Pennsylvania arrived in the area and purchased land in the area. Among the first settlers to arrive in what was later to become Preston was John Erb, a Mennonite from Lancaster County, who arrived in 1805. He bought 7,500 acres (3,035 ha) including land at the confluence of the Grand and Speed Rivers in what later became Preston.

The first school opened in 1802 near the village of Blair, then known as Shinglebridge. The first teacher's name was Mr. Rittenhaus.

It was John Erb who bought the 7,500 acres (3,035 ha) of land and settled it in 1805. He later built a sawmill in 1806 and a gristmill in 1807. This settlement became known as Cambridge Mills.

Even in the early 1800s, the area included homes, a store, an inn, small shops operated by artisans and craftsmen, mostly immigrants from Germany. The Erb sons had hired William Scollick for their development business and the latter completed a full survey in 1834 and convinced the Erbs to rename the Cambridge Mills area to Preston. After Erb's death in 1832, a son sold off property on both sides of the Speed River. What eventually became Preston started as a large settlement on the north side.

There were only 250 inhabitants in 1836, many from Pennsylvania, but the population had reached about 1600 by 1855, with some 70% originally from Germany. By then, the area had eight hotels and taverns. Some of these hotels, such as the North American Hotel (later called the Kress and still standing) from the 1840s and the later Del Monte (most successful in the 1890s) and the Sulphur Springs, were built to accommodate visitors who arrived via the Great Road to benefit from the mineral springs. The high sulphur content was believed to be useful for those with arthritis and rheumatism.

The Canadian Gazetter of 1846 indicates a population of about 600 inhabitants, two churches, a post office that receives mail each day, a steam grist mill, and tradesmen of various types. At the time, there was no significant industry.

The Preston post office opened in 1837 and the population continued to grow primarily because of immigration from Germany. Preston was incorporated as a village in 1853. Due to continued growth, by 1879 there were many industries such as a foundry, carriage manufacturer, potteries and a furniture company. This was also the year that the Cherry Flour Mills started, which would later become the Dover Flour Mills, a Preston company that still operates today.

The Preston Springs Hotel, then called the Del Monte Hotel, was operating prior to 1888, and featured 5 acres (2.0 ha) of grounds with gardens and lawns. The primary attraction was the mineral baths in the basement, whose high sulphur content was believed to cleanse the body and treat arthritis and rheumatism. A competing facility next door, the Sulphur Springs Hotel, opened in the mid 1890s, and a nearby hotel, the North American (renamed the Kress Hotel in 1900), had opened in 1840. Walder sold the Del Monte in 1903; a later owner, A.R. Kauffman, renamed it Preston Springs, and the facility remained successful as a health spa until 1940. After the war, it closed for some years, eventually becoming a retirement and care facility, until closing in 1990, when the building was boarded up, and remained vacant. The building was vacant since 2012. The city considered issuing a demolition order but in June 2020, the matter was referred to a provincial tribunal that handles disputes on heritage properties. Finally, the city ordered an emergency demolition in late December 2020 for reasons of public safety; the work began on 30 December.

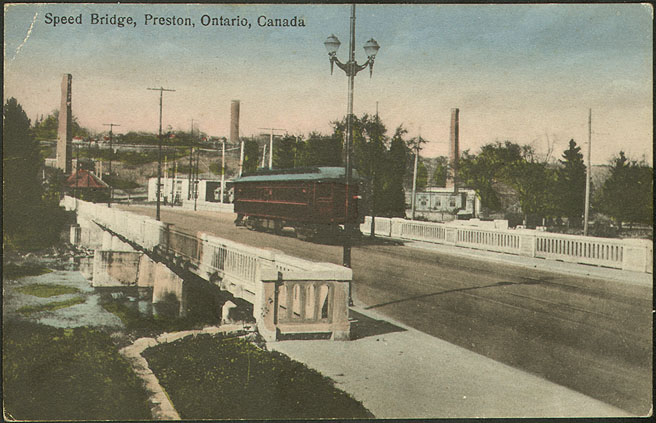
A streetcar crosses the Speed River c. 1910.

Various interurban and street railways connected Preston to neighbouring towns over the years. The Galt and Preston Street Railway was chartered in 1890, but disputes over construction and management delayed the start of construction until 1894. In particular, Preston merchants feared a loss of business that might ensue from shoppers taking the streetcar to Galt rather than shopping locally. These concerns were partially addressed by having the head office of the railway company be located in Preston, rather than Galt as originally intended. The steam equipment which powered the street railway's electrification system, including the boilers and engines, was supplied by the Goldie and McCulloch Company of Galt. When completed, the result was a 4-mile (6.4 km) line running from the Great Western Railway station in Galt along Water Street, then alongside the road between Preston and Galt (now Concession Boulevard), then along the centre of King Street in Preston, crossing the Speed River using a timber trestle bridge. The line terminated in the vicinity of the Del Monte Hotel. Passenger service on the line was provided by a set of electric streetcars, while early freight service was provided by a small steam locomotive and boxcar which transported less than carload freight between the Canadian Pacific Railway freight office at Galt and merchants in Preston.

Soon, in 1895, the Galt and Preston Street Railway became the Galt, Preston and Hespeler Street Railway, with the authorization of a 3.60-mile (5.79 km) branch line from Preston to Hespeler. The Hespeler branch line was constructed on a private right of way rather than running in the street, and the street railway company upgraded its freight service with an electric locomotive provided by the Canadian General Electric Company of Peterborough. A number of industrial sidings were constructed to serve freight customers along King Street, providing street-level urban freight rail service to three large Preston furniture factories, as well as a coal yard, wood yard, flour mill, and stove and furnace foundry.

On September 30, 1899 Preston was incorporated as a town with a population of just under 11,000. The Great Road between Dundas and Berlin (Kitchener) as well as the railroad connections helped the community to continue growing into an important industrial centre. Products made here included flour, agricultural implements, furniture, stoves, shoes and textiles. Preston grew and continued to be a successful industrial area; expansion followed in the 1950s and 1960s.

While most of the population of what became Waterloo County, Ontario was Protestant in 1911, Preston had a larger share of Roman Catholics, 844, while 862 were Lutherans, 707 Methodists, 704 Anglicans, and 525 Presbyterians.

Located in Riverside Park, Leisure Lodge operated from 1948 until it was destroyed by a fire in 1980. It was started by Olaf "Olie" Waimel as a big band music venue and included a massive outdoor dance floor.

== Government ==
The local government is the Cambridge City Council consisting of a mayor and eight councillors, each representing a ward. The mayor (2014-2018 term) is Doug Craig.

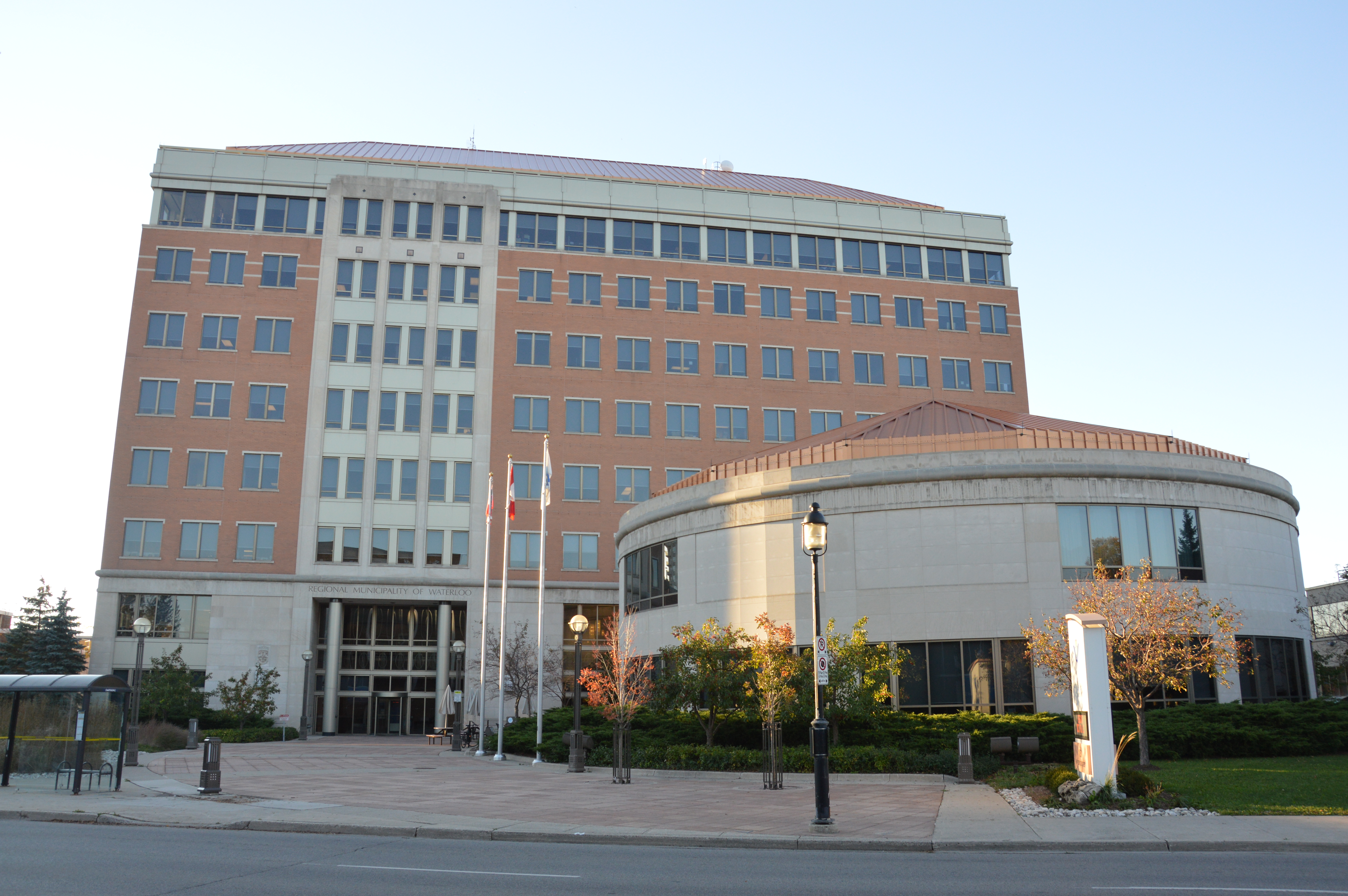
Region of Waterloo Headquarters in Kitchener

Cambridge is also represented on the higher-tier Waterloo Regional Council which consists of the Regional Chair, the Mayors of the seven cities and townships, and eight additional Councilors - four from Kitchener and two each from Cambridge and Waterloo. Ken Seiling has held the position of Regional Chair since 1985.

Cambridge is represented in Ottawa by Bryan May (Liberal), the federal member of Parliament who defeated the previous incumbent MP (Gary Goodyear, Conservative – 2004 to 2015) in the October 2015 election.

The MPP for Cambridge is Belinda Karahalios of the Ontario Progressive Conservative Party, who was first elected to this position in 2018.

== Municipal services ==
Prestion was an independent entity in Waterloo County, Ontario until 1973 when amalgamation created the Regional Municipality of Waterloo. At that time, Preston was amalgamated into the new city of Cambridge. The Region handles many services, including Fire, Police, waste management, community health, transit, recreation, planning, roads and social services.

The Region consists of the cities of Cambridge, Kitchener, and Waterloo, and the townships of Woolwich, Wilmot, Wellesley, and North Dumfries.

=== Public transportation ===
Since 2000, public transport throughout the Region of Waterloo has been provided by Grand River Transit, which was created by a merger of the former Cambridge Transit and Kitchener Transit.

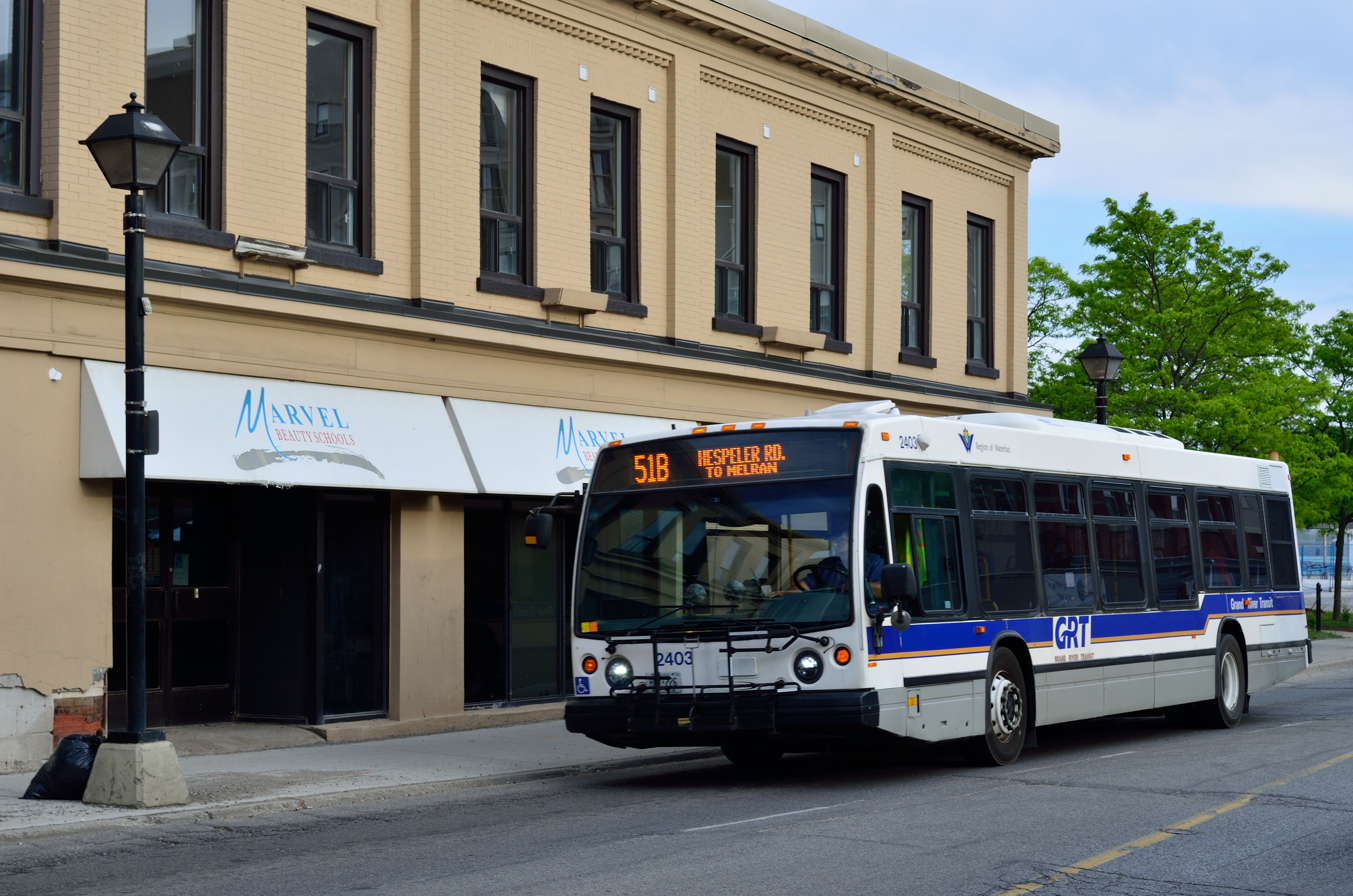
Grand River Transit bus in Cambridge

GRT operates a number of routes in Cambridge, four of which travel outside of the city: presently the 206 (Previously the 52), 61, 72, and 111 buses run to southern Kitchener, while the iXpress limited-stop express route runs from the Ainslie St. Transit Terminal (Galt) through Kitchener to the north end of Waterloo.

In June 2009 Regional Council voted to approve a plan to construct a light rail line, which has been named the Ion rapid transit. The first phase would run from Conestoga Mall in the north of Waterloo, to Fairview Park Mall in the south of Kitchener.

The second phase of the line would run from Fairview Mall to the Galt area of Cambridge. Mayor Doug Craig was a determined opponent of the plan. He felt that a series of buses would be just as effective but much less expensive. As of late February 2017, the Kitchener-Waterloo portion was well into the final phase of construction, but plans for the Cambridge section of the LRT were still in the very early stage. Public consultations were just getting started at the time. Three routes had been agreed on in 2011, with eight "endorsed" stops: at Fairway, Sportsworld, Preston, Pinebush, Cambridge Centre Mall, Can-Amera, Delta and Ainslie Street Terminal. Three others were still being considered.

== Education ==
Public English-language schooling is provided by the Waterloo Region District School Board, which operates 26 elementary and five secondary schools in Cambridge.

Publicly funded Catholic education is available through schools operated by the Waterloo Catholic District School Board.

Preston is home to one high school, Preston High; one public middle school, William G Davis; as well as the elementary schools Preston Public, Coronation Public, Grandview Public, Parkway Public, Blue Heron Public, St. Michael's Catholic and St. Joseph's Catholic.

The University of Waterloo School of Architecture campus is located in nearby Galt in the Riverside Silk Mill, also known as the Tiger Brand Building. Inside there is a theatre, a fitness room, and the gallery "Design at Riverside", which is one of two publicly funded galleries dedicated to architecture in Canada. The School of Architecture is home to 380 students who live, study, and learn within the Cambridge community.

== Parks and trails ==
The main park in Preston is Riverside Park. It is Cambridge's largest community park with an area of 256 acres (1.02 km^{2}.) The park contains a splash pad, two playgrounds, tennis courts, soccer pitch, a skateboard park, picnic areas that can be reserved, and a multitude of walking trails. The baseball fields are used often and on Canada Day there is always an event at the field whether it is a fair, bands at a bandstand, or fireworks. Riverside Park also hosts a fishing derby on Canada Day when support is available.

The 7.5 kilometre Mill Run Trail runs north-east from the park at Russ Street, along the banks of the Speed River, to Sheffield Street in the town of Hespeler. On its way, it passes through the hamlet of Speedsville, the former site of Idylwild Park and Chilligo Conservation Area.

Also in Preston is Linear Park which has extensive trails for walking, running or biking. At certain points the trail gives a perfect view of the confluence of the Grand and the Speed Rivers.

== Preston Towne Centre ==
This traditional downtown core area remains active and through the B.I.A. has organized a closely knit group of merchants providing varied goods and services in office-related industry, business service industries and licensed restaurants. The target market area is predominately the immediate surrounding residential area, which is growing through new high density developments. In addition, high traffic counts through this area adds to the market potential.

The Grist Mill Centre including a new Giant Tiger Department store is a small commercial mall on King Street in Preston.

== See also ==
- Cambridge, Ontario
- Hespeler, Ontario
- Preston Car Company
- Regional Municipality of Waterloo
- Speed River
