= Canadian Pacific 283 =

Canadian Pacific No. 283
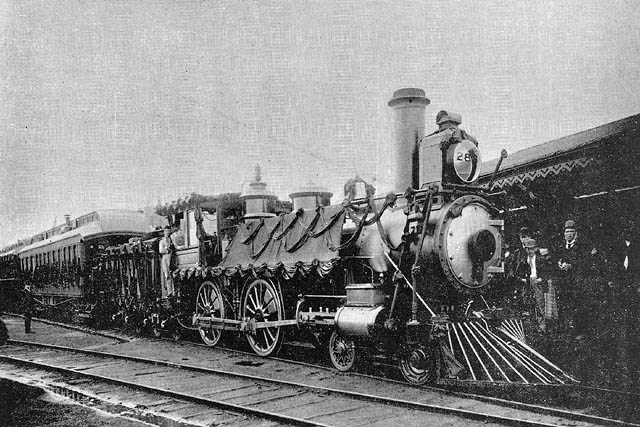
- Engine 283 with Prime Minister Sir John A. Macdonald's funeral train.
Type and origin
- Power type: Steam
- Builder: Hinkley Locomotive Works
- Serial number: 1619
- Build date: 1883
Specifications
- Configuration
  - Whyte: 4-4-0 American
- Driver dia.: 62 in (1,575 mm)
- Cylinder size: 17 in × 24 in (432 mm × 610 mm)
Career
- Operators: Canadian Pacific Railway
- Numbers: 283
- Retired: 1897
- Disposition: Scrapped

Canadian Pacific Railway no. 283 was a 4-4-0 locomotive built by the Hinkley Locomotive Works in 1883. The engine did not receive a class designation like most of the railway's locomotives received, and little is known about its service life, though it can be assumed that the engine was in general passenger and freight service throughout its career. The engine is notable for having pulled the funeral train of former Canadian Prime Minister John A. Macdonald from Ottawa to Kingston, Ontario on June 10, 1891. It was scrapped in 1897.
