= Canadian Pacific Railway =

Class I railway in Canada and the United States

- Chemin de fer Canadien Pacifique

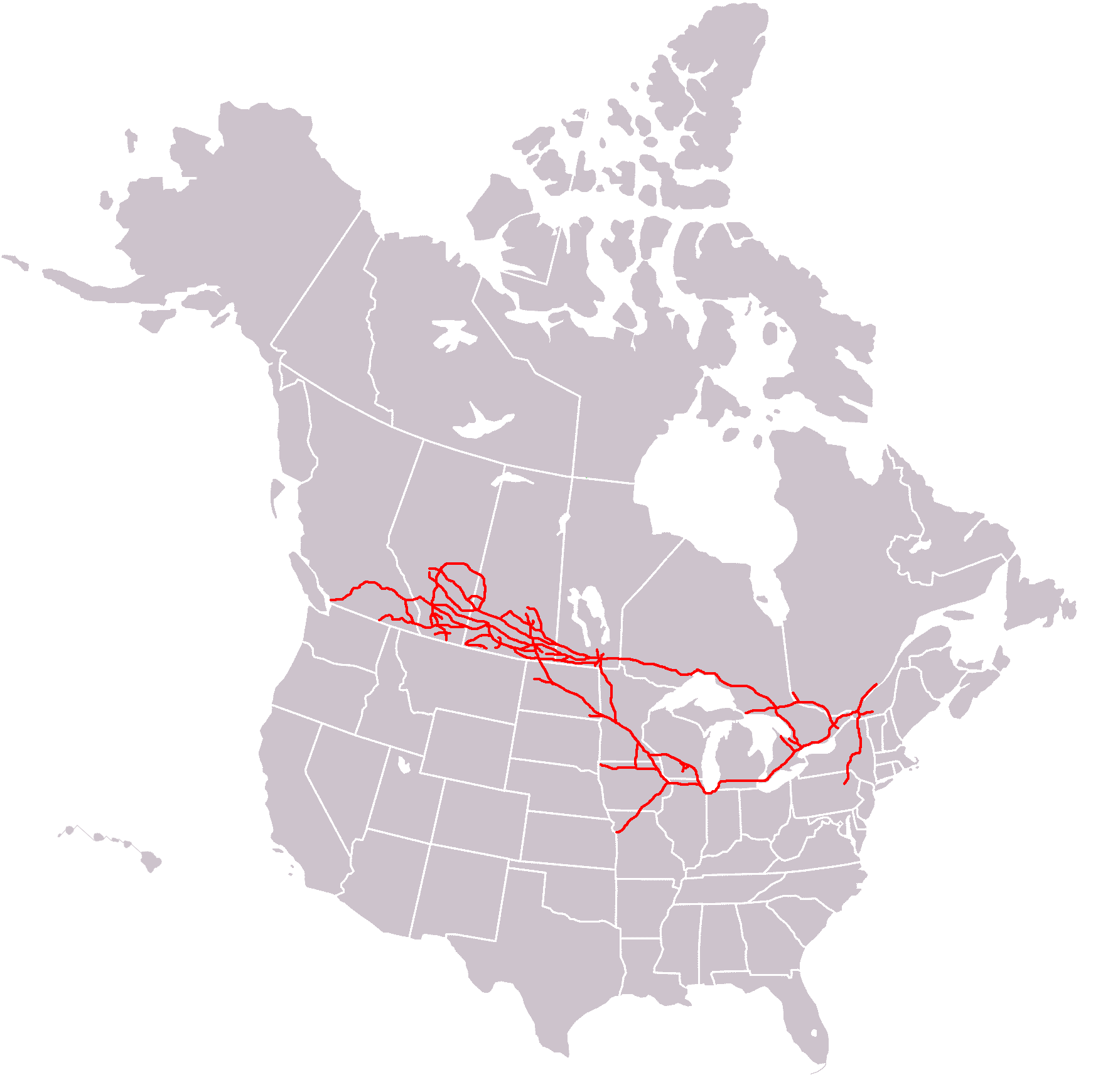
- Canadian Pacific 2023 system map (does not include CMQ and some DM&E trackage)

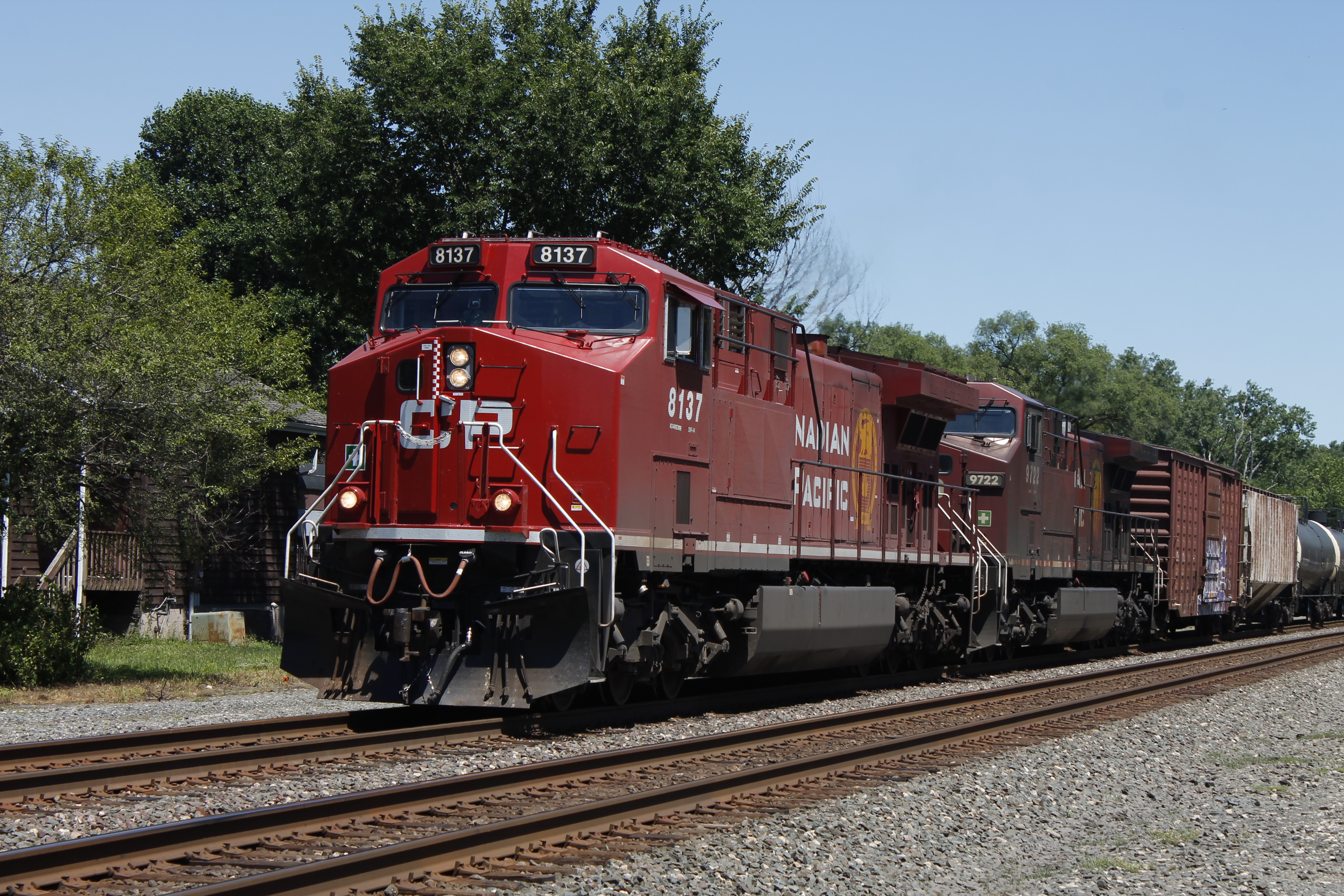
- CP 8137, a rebuilt GE AC4400CWM, in Chesterton, Indiana

Overview
- Parent company: CPKC
- Headquarters: Calgary, Alberta, Canada
- Reporting mark: CP, CPAA, MILW, SOO, DME, ICE, DH
- Locale: Canada and the United States
- Dates of operation: 1881–present

Technical
- Track gauge: 1,435 mm (4 ft 8 1/2 in) standard gauge
- Length: 20,100 kilometres (12,500 mi)

Other
- Website: cpr.ca

The Canadian Pacific Railway (French: Chemin de fer Canadien Pacifique) (reporting marks CP, CPAA, MILW, SOO), also known simply as CPR or Canadian Pacific and formerly as CP Rail (1968–1996), is a Canadian Class I railway incorporated in 1881. The railway is owned by Canadian Pacific Kansas City Limited, known until 2023 as Canadian Pacific Railway Limited, which began operations as legal owner in a corporate restructuring in 2001.

The railway is headquartered in Calgary, Alberta. In 2023, the railway owned approximately 20,100 kilometres (12,500 mi) of track in seven provinces of Canada and into the United States, stretching from Montreal to Vancouver, and as far north as Edmonton. Its rail network also served Minneapolis–St. Paul, Milwaukee, Detroit, Chicago, and Albany, New York, in the United States.

The railway was first built between eastern Canada and British Columbia between 1875 and 1885 (connecting with Ottawa Valley and Georgian Bay area lines built earlier), fulfilling a commitment extended to British Columbia when it entered Confederation in 1871; the CPR was Canada's first transcontinental railway. Primarily a freight railway, the CPR was for decades the only practical means of long-distance passenger transport in most regions of Canada and was instrumental in the colonization and development of Western Canada. The CPR became one of the largest and most powerful companies in Canada, a position it held as late as 1975. The company acquired two American lines in 2009: the Dakota, Minnesota and Eastern Railroad (DM&E) and the Iowa, Chicago and Eastern Railroad (IC&E). The company also owns the Indiana Harbor Belt Railroad, a Hammond, Indiana-based terminal railroad along with Conrail Shared Assets Operations. CPR purchased the Kansas City Southern Railway in December 2021 for US$31 billion. On April 14, 2023, KCS became a wholly owned subsidiary of CPR, and both CPR and its subsidiaries began doing business under the name of its parent company, CPKC.

The CPR is publicly traded on both the Toronto Stock Exchange and the New York Stock Exchange under the ticker CP. Its U.S. headquarters are in Minneapolis. As of March 30, 2023, the largest shareholder of Canadian Pacific is the Royal Bank of Canada, at 5.94% of shares.

== History ==
The creation of the Canadian Pacific Railway was undertaken as the National Dream by the Conservative government of John A. Macdonald, together with mining magnate Alexander Tilloch Galt. As a condition for joining Confederation, British Columbia had insisted on a transport link to the East, with the rest of the Confederation. In 1873, Macdonald, among other high-ranking politicians, bribed in the Pacific Scandal, granted contracts to the Canada Pacific Railway Company, which was unrelated to the current company, as opposed to the Inter-Ocean Railway Company, which was thought to have connections to the Northern Pacific Railway Company in the United States. In 1867, the year of Canada's Confederation, US Secretary of State William H. Seward surmised that the whole North American continent "shall be, sooner or later, within the magic circle of the American Union." After this scandal, the Conservatives were removed from power, and Alexander Mackenzie, the new Liberal prime minister, ordered construction of the railway under the supervision of the Department of Public Works.

Enabled by the CPR Act of 1874, work began in 1875 on the Lake Superior to Manitoba section of the CPR. The ceremonial sod-turning at Westfort on June 1, 1875, was prominently reported in the June 10 edition of the Toronto Globe. It noted that a crowd of "upwards of 500 ladies and gentlemen" gathered to celebrate the event on the left bank of the Kaministiquia River in the District of Thunder Bay, about four miles upriver from Fort William.

Macdonald would later return as prime minister in 1878 and adopt a more aggressive construction policy. Bonds were floated in London and called for tenders to complete sections of the railway in British Columbia. American contractor Andrew Onderdonk was selected, and his men began construction on May 15, 1880.

In October 1880, a new consortium signed a contract with the Macdonald government, agreeing to build the railway for $25 million in credit and 25 million acres (100,000 km^{2}) of land. In addition, the government defrayed surveying costs and exempted the railway from property taxes for 20 years. Once completed in 1882 with a last spike at Feist Lake, near Vermilion Bay, Ontario, the line was turned over to the newly minted private Canadian Pacific Railway company. In 1883, the first wheat shipment from Manitoba was transported over this line to the Lakehead (Fort William and Port Arthur) on Lake Superior.

A beaver was chosen as the railway's logo in honour of Donald Smith, 1st Baron Strathcona and Mount Royal, who had risen from factor to governor of the Hudson's Bay Company over a lengthy career in the beaver fur trade.

=== Building the railway, 1881–1886 ===
Canadian Pacific Railway Limited

- An alternative CP logo, featuring a beaver, Canada's national animal
- Type: Public
- Traded as: TSX: CP; NYSE: CP
- Industry: Rail transport
- Founded: February 16, 1881; 145 years ago
- Defunct: April 14, 2023; 3 years ago
- Successor: Canadian Pacific Kansas City Limited
- Headquarters: Calgary, Alberta, Canada
- Area served: Canada; Contiguous United States
- Key people: Andrew Reardon (chairman); Keith Creel (president and CEO)
- Revenue: ▼CA$7.710 billion (2020)
- Operating income: ▲CA$3.311 billion (2020)
- Net income: ▲CA$2.444 billion (2020)
- Total assets: ▼CA$19.221 billion (2020)
- Total equity: ▲CA$4.626 billion (2020)
- Number of employees: 11,904 (2020)
- Subsidiaries: List of subsidiaries

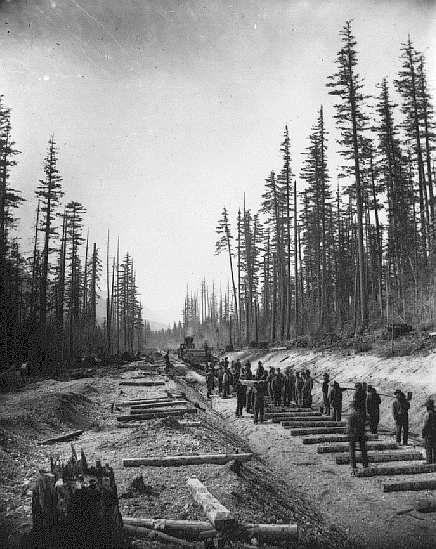
CPR crew laying track at lower Fraser Valley, 1883

Building the railway took over four years. The Canadian Pacific Railway began its westward expansion from Bonfield, Ontario, where the first spike was driven into a sunken railway tie. That was the point where the Canada Central Railway (CCR) extension ended. The CCR started in Brockville and extended to Pembroke. It then followed a westward route along the Ottawa River and continued to Mattawa at the confluence of the Mattawa and Ottawa rivers. It then proceeded to Bonfield.

It was presumed that the railway would travel through the rich "fertile belt" of the North Saskatchewan River Valley and cross the Rocky Mountains via the Yellowhead Pass. However, a more southerly route across the arid Palliser's Triangle in the District of Assiniboia and via Kicking Horse Pass and down the Field Hill to the Rocky Mountain Trench was chosen.

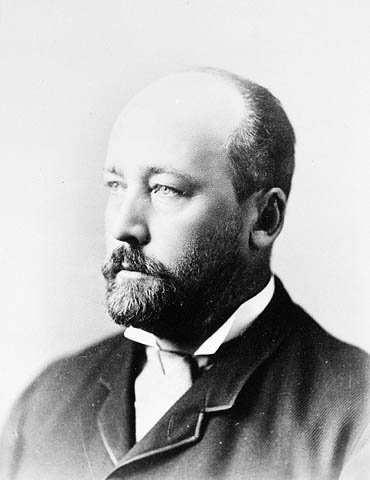
William Cornelius Van Horne

In 1881, construction progressed at a pace too slow for the railway's officials who, in 1882, hired the renowned railway executive William Cornelius Van Horne to oversee construction. Van Horne stated that he would have 800 km (500 mi) of main line built in 1882. Floods delayed the start of the construction season, but over 672 km (418 mi) of main line, as well as sidings and branch lines, were built that year.

The Thunder Bay branch (west from Fort William) was completed in June 1882 by the Department of Railways and Canals and turned over to the company in May 1883. Construction reached Calgary in the North-West Territories' District of Alberta by August 1883, and regular service to Winnipeg, Manitoba, was established by December 1883. By the end of 1883, the railway had reached the Rocky Mountains, just 8 km (5.0 mi) east of Kicking Horse Pass. The treacherous 190 km (120 mi) of railway west of Fort William was completed by Purcell & Company, headed by "Canada's wealthiest and greatest railroad contractor," industrialist Hugh Ryan.

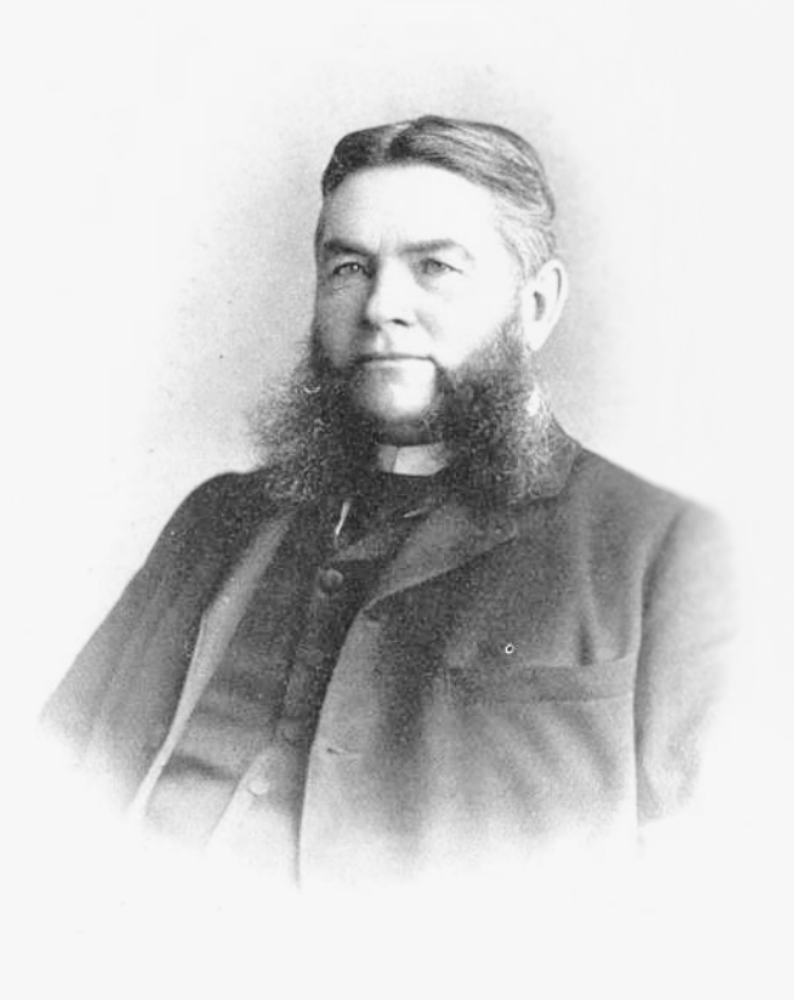
Irish-Canadian industrialist and railway magnate Hugh Ryan

Many thousands of navvies worked on the railway. Many were European immigrants. An unknown number of Stoney Nakoda also assisted in track laying and construction work in the Kicking Horse Pass region. (Note: John Lee Laurie, Ee-yayth-skabe-the Stonies in Alberta, unpublished manuscript, 37, John Lee Laurie fonds, F0048, Glenbow Archives.) In British Columbia, government contractors eventually hired 17,000 workers from China, known as "coolies". After 2 1/2 months of hard labour, they could net as little as $16 ($506 in 2025 adjusted for inflation) Chinese labourers in British Columbia made only between 75¢ and $1.25 a day, paid in rice mats, and not including expenses, leaving barely anything to send home. They did the most dangerous construction jobs, such as working with explosives to clear tunnels through rock. The exact number of Chinese workers who died is unknown, but historians estimate the number is between 600 and 800.

By 1883, railway construction was progressing rapidly, but the CPR was in danger of running out of funds. In response, on January 31, 1884, the government passed the Railway Relief Bill, providing a further $22.5 million in loans to the CPR. The bill received royal assent on March 6, 1884.

In March 1885, the North-West Rebellion broke out in the District of Saskatchewan. Van Horne, in Ottawa at the time, suggested to the government that the CPR could transport troops to Qu'Appelle in the District of Assiniboia in 10 days. Some sections of track were incomplete or had not been used before, but the trip to Winnipeg was made in nine days and the rebellion quickly suppressed. Controversially, the government subsequently reorganized the CPR's debt and provided a further $5 million loan. This money was desperately needed by the CPR. Even with Van Horne's support with moving troops to Qu'Appelle, the government still delayed in giving its support to CPR, due to Macdonald pressuring George Stephen for additional benefits.

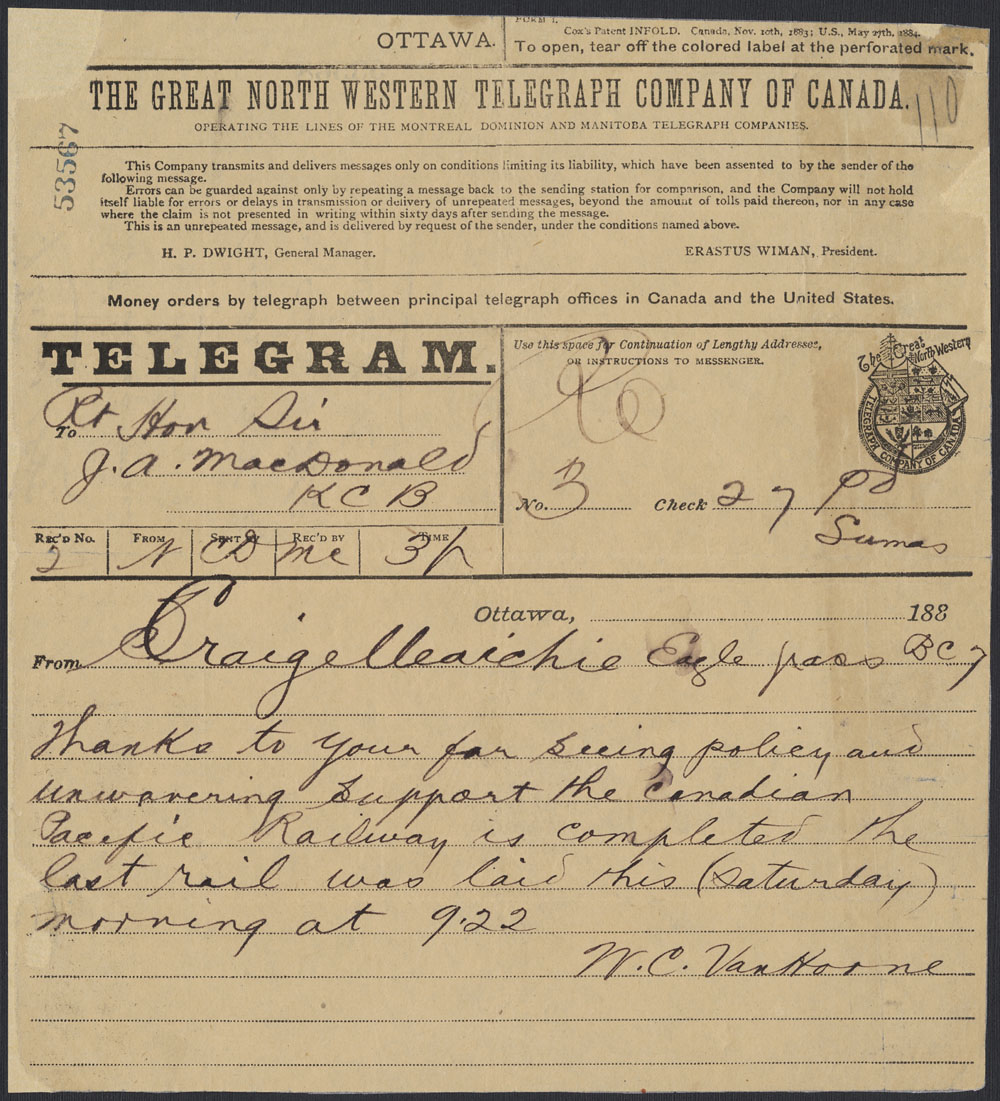
Telegram to Prime Minister John A. Macdonald announcing the completion of the CPR, November 7, 1885

On November 7, 1885, the last spike was driven at Craigellachie, British Columbia by one of the CPR directors, Donald Smith. Four days earlier, the last spike of the Lake Superior section was driven in just west of Jackfish, Ontario. While the railway was completed four years after the original 1881 deadline, it was completed more than five years ahead of the new date of 1891 that Macdonald gave in 1881.

In Eastern Canada, the CPR had created a network of lines reaching from Quebec City to St. Thomas, Ontario, by 1885 – mainly by buying the Quebec, Montreal, Ottawa & Occidental Railway from the Quebec government and by creating a new railway company, the Ontario and Quebec Railway (O&Q). It also launched a fleet of Great Lakes ships to link its terminals. Through the O&Q, the CPR had effected purchases and long-term leases of several railways, and built a line between Perth, Ontario, and Toronto (completed on May 5, 1884) to connect these acquisitions. The CPR obtained a 999-year lease on the O&Q on January 4, 1884. In 1895, it acquired a minority interest in the Toronto, Hamilton and Buffalo Railway, giving it a link to New York and the Northeast United States.

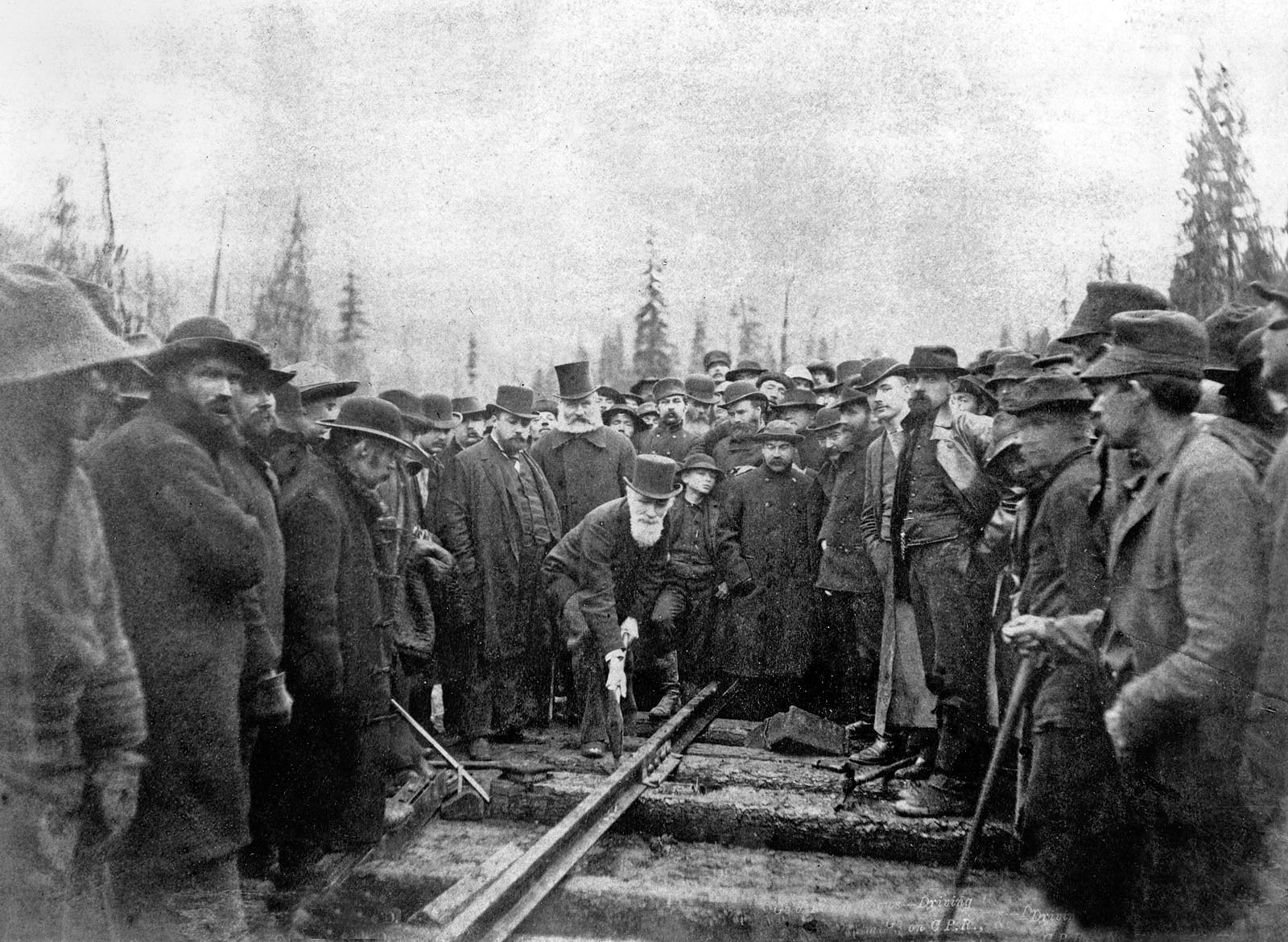
Donald Smith, later known as Lord Strathcona, drives the last spike of the CPR, at Craigellachie, November 7, 1885. Completion of the transcontinental railway was a condition of BC's entry into Confederation.

=== 1886–1900 ===
The first transcontinental passenger train departed from Montreal's Dalhousie Station, at Berri Street and Notre Dame Street, at 8 pm on June 28, 1886, and arrived at Port Moody at noon on July 4. This train consisted of two baggage cars, a mail car, one second-class coach, two immigrant sleepers, two first-class coaches, two sleeping cars and a diner (several dining cars were used throughout the journey, as they were removed from the train during the night, with another one added the next morning).

By that time, however, the CPR had decided to move its western terminus from Port Moody to Granville, which was renamed "Vancouver" later that year. The first official train destined for Vancouver arrived on May 23, 1887, although the line had already been in use for three months. The CPR quickly became profitable, and all loans from the federal government were repaid years ahead of time. In 1888, a branch line was opened between Sudbury and Sault Ste. Marie where the CPR connected with the American railway system and its own steamships. That same year, work was started on a line from London, Ontario, to the Canada–US border at Windsor, Ontario. That line opened on June 12, 1890.

The CPR also leased the New Brunswick Railway in 1891 for 991 years, and built the International Railway of Maine, connecting Montreal with Saint John, New Brunswick, in 1889. The connection with Saint John on the Atlantic coast made the CPR the first truly transcontinental railway company in Canada and permitted trans-Atlantic cargo and passenger services to continue year-round when sea ice in the Gulf of St. Lawrence closed the port of Montreal during the winter months. By 1896, competition with the Great Northern Railway for traffic in southern British Columbia forced the CPR to construct a second line across the province, south of the original line. Van Horne, now president of the CPR, asked for government aid, and the government agreed to provide around $3.6 million to construct a railway from Lethbridge, Alberta, through Crowsnest Pass to the south shore of Kootenay Lake, in exchange for the CPR agreeing to reduce freight rates in perpetuity for key commodities shipped in Western Canada.

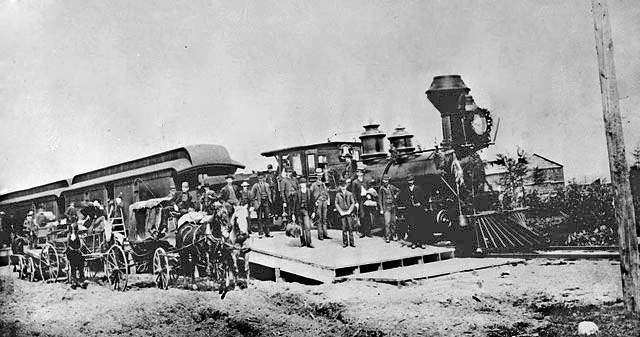
First transcontinental train arrives in Port Arthur on June 30, 1886

The controversial Crowsnest Pass Agreement effectively locked the eastbound rate on grain products and westbound rates on certain "settlers' effects" at the 1897 level. Although temporarily suspended during the First World War, it was not until 1983 that the "Crow Rate" was permanently replaced by the Western Grain Transportation Act, which allowed the gradual increase of grain shipping prices. The Crowsnest Pass line opened on June 18, 1898, and followed a complicated route through the maze of valleys and passes in southern British Columbia, rejoining the original mainline at Hope after crossing the Cascade Mountains via Coquihalla Pass.

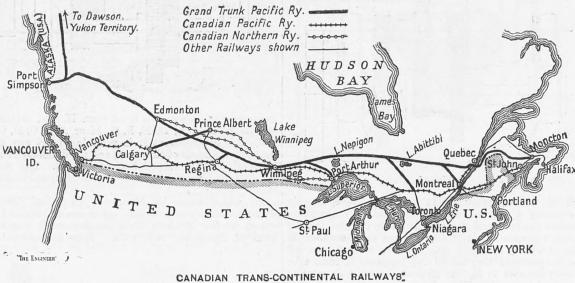
The system in 1906, soon after the construction of the transcontinental railway

The Southern Mainline, generally known as the Kettle Valley Railway in British Columbia, was built in response to the booming mining and smelting economy in southern British Columbia, and the tendency of the local geography to encourage and enable easier access from neighbouring US states than from Vancouver or the rest of Canada, which was viewed to be as much of a threat to national security as it was to the province's control of its own resources. The local passenger service was re-routed to this new southerly line, which connected numerous emergent small cities across the region. Independent railways and subsidiaries that were eventually merged into the CPR in connection with this route were the Shuswap and Okanagan Railway, the Kaslo and Slocan Railway, the Columbia and Kootenay Railway, the Columbia and Western Railway and various others.

==== Settlement of western Canada ====
One of the CPR's land offerings, 1883

Under the initial contract with the Canadian government to build the railway, the CPR was granted 100,000 square kilometres (25 million acres). Canadian Pacific then began an intense campaign to bring immigrants to Canada; its agents operated in many overseas locations, where immigrants were often sold a package that included passage on a CP ship, travel on a CP train and land sold by the CP railway. Land was priced at $2.50 an acre and up but required cultivation. To transport immigrants, Canadian Pacific developed a fleet of over a thousand Colonist cars, low-budget sleeper cars designed to transport immigrant families from eastern Canadian seaports to the west.

=== 1901–1914 ===
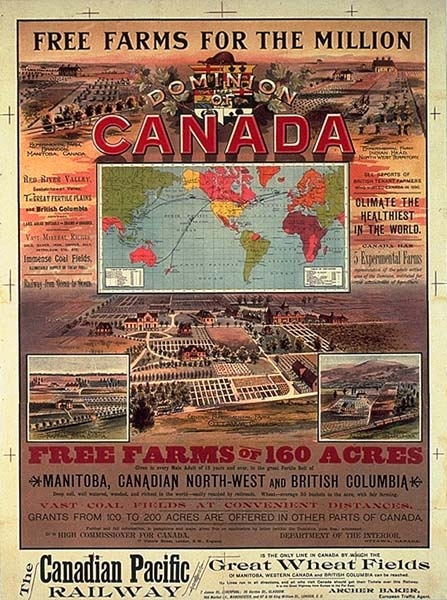
CPR advertisement highlighting "Free Farms for the Million" in western Canada, circa 1893

During the first decade of the 20th century, the CPR continued to build more lines. In 1908, the CPR opened a line connecting Toronto with Sudbury. Several operational improvements were also made to the railway in Western Canada.

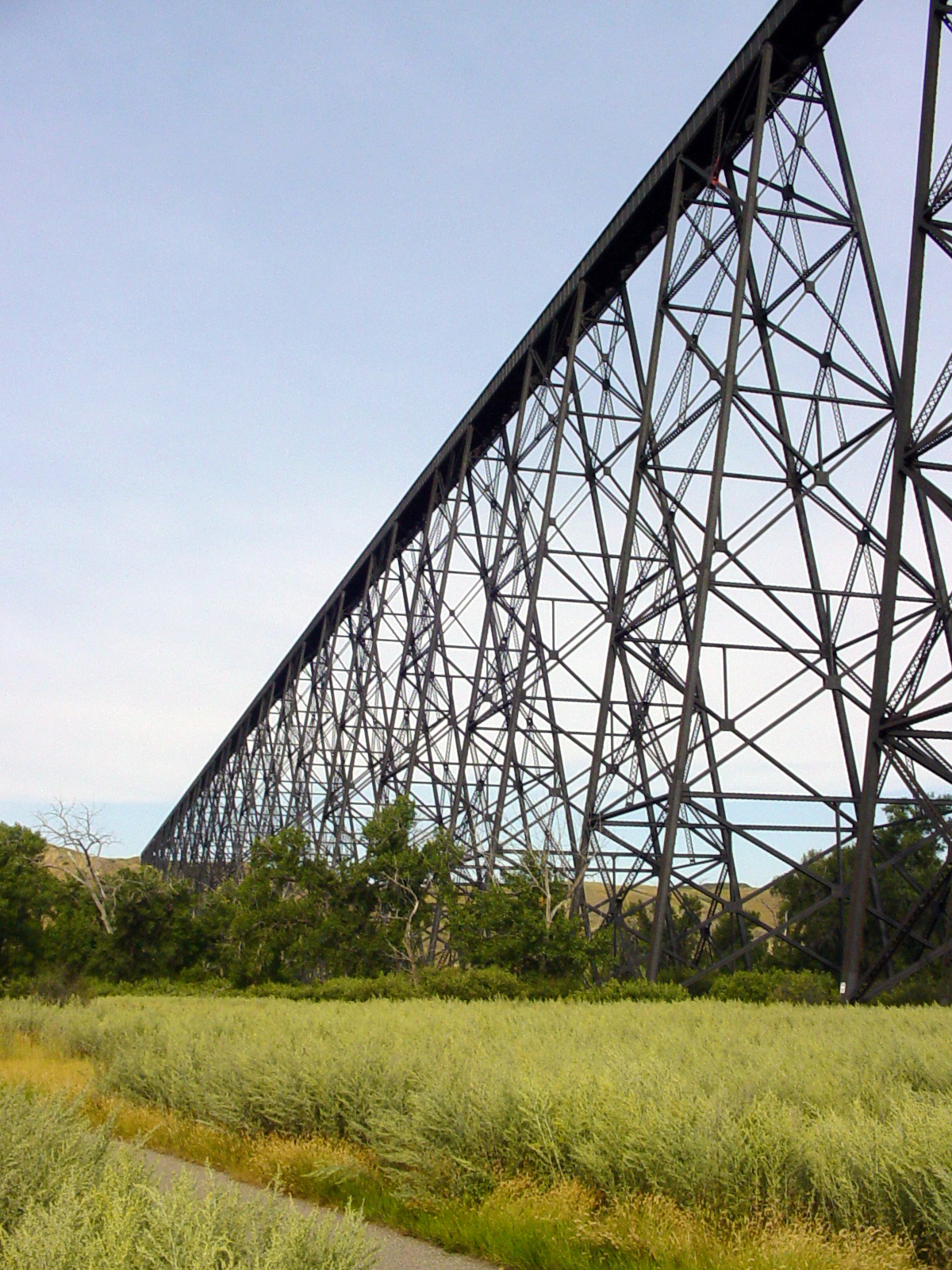
Lethbridge Viaduct

On November 3, 1909, the Lethbridge Viaduct over the Oldman River valley at Lethbridge, Alberta, was opened. It is 1,624 metres (5,328 feet) long and, at its maximum, 96 metres (315 feet) high, making it one of the longest railway bridges in Canada. In 1916, the CPR replaced its line through Rogers Pass, which was prone to avalanches (the most serious of which killed 62 men in 1910) with the Connaught Tunnel, an eight-kilometre-long (5-mile) tunnel under Mount Macdonald that was, at the time of its opening, the longest railway tunnel in the Western Hemisphere.

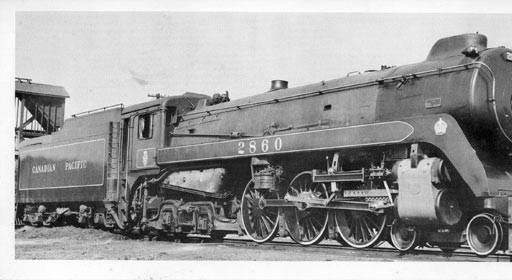
C.P.R. railway locomotive 2860

On January 21, 1910, a passenger train derailed on the CPR line at the Spanish River bridge at Nairn, Ontario (near Sudbury), killing at least 43.

On January 3, 1912, the CPR acquired the Dominion Atlantic Railway, a railway that ran in western Nova Scotia. This acquisition gave the CPR a connection to Halifax, a significant port on the Atlantic Ocean. The CPR acquired the Quebec Central Railway on December 14, 1912.

During the late 19th century, the railway undertook an ambitious program of hotel construction, building Glacier House in Glacier National Park, Mount Stephen House at Field, British Columbia, the Château Frontenac in Quebec City and the Banff Springs Hotel. By then, the CPR had competition from three other transcontinental lines, all of them money-losers. In 1919, these lines were consolidated into the government-owned Canadian National Railways.

=== First World War ===
During the First World War, CPR put the entire resources of the "world's greatest travel system" at the disposal of the British Empire, not only trains and tracks, but also its ships, shops, hotels, telegraphs and, above all, its people. Aiding the war effort meant transporting and billeting troops; building and supplying arms and munitions; arming, lending and selling ships. Fifty-two CPR ships were pressed into service during World War I, carrying more than a million troops and passengers and four million tons of cargo. Twenty seven survived and returned to CPR. CPR also helped the war effort with money and jobs. CPR made loans and guarantees to the Allies of some $100 million. As a lasting tribute, CPR commissioned three statues and 23 memorial tablets to commemorate the efforts of those who fought and those who died in the war. After the war, the Federal government created Canadian National Railways (CNR, later CN) out of several bankrupt railways that fell into government hands during and after the war. CNR would become the main competitor to the CPR in Canada. In 1923, Henry Worth Thornton replaced David Blyth Hanna becoming the second president of the CNR, and his competition spurred Edward Wentworth Beatty, the first Canadian-born president of the CPR, to action. During this time the railway land grants were formalized.

=== Great Depression and the Second World War, 1929–1945 ===
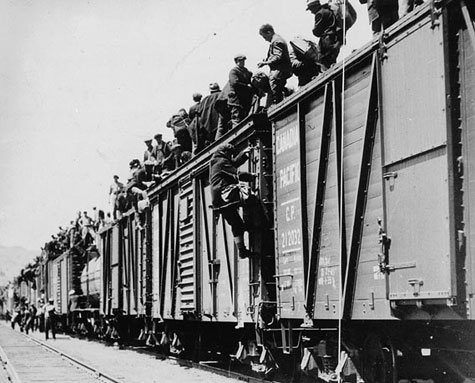
Strikers from unemployment relief camps climbing on boxcars as part of the On-to-Ottawa Trek, 1935

The Great Depression, which lasted from 1929 until 1939, hit many companies heavily. While the CPR was affected, it was not affected to the extent of its rival CNR because it, unlike the CNR, was debt-free. The CPR scaled back on some of its passenger and freight services and stopped issuing dividends to its shareholders after 1932. Hard times led to the creation of new political parties such as the Social Credit movement and the Cooperative Commonwealth Federation, as well as popular protest in the form of the On-to-Ottawa Trek.

One highlight of the late 1930s, both for the railway and for Canada, was the visit of King George VI and Queen Elizabeth during their 1939 royal tour of Canada, the first time that the reigning monarch had visited the country. The CPR and the CNR shared the honours of pulling the royal train across the country, with the CPR undertaking the westbound journey from Quebec City to Vancouver. Later that year, the Second World War began. As it had done in World War I, the CPR devoted much of its resources to the war effort. It retooled its Angus Shops in Montreal to produce Valentine tanks and other armoured vehicles, and transported troops and resources across the country. Additionally, 22 of the CPR's ships went to war, 12 of which were sunk.

=== 1946–1978 ===
The Multimark logo was used from 1968 to 1987, when it fell out of favour. It was sometimes referred to as the 'Pac-Man' logo, after the popular 1980s video game of the same name.

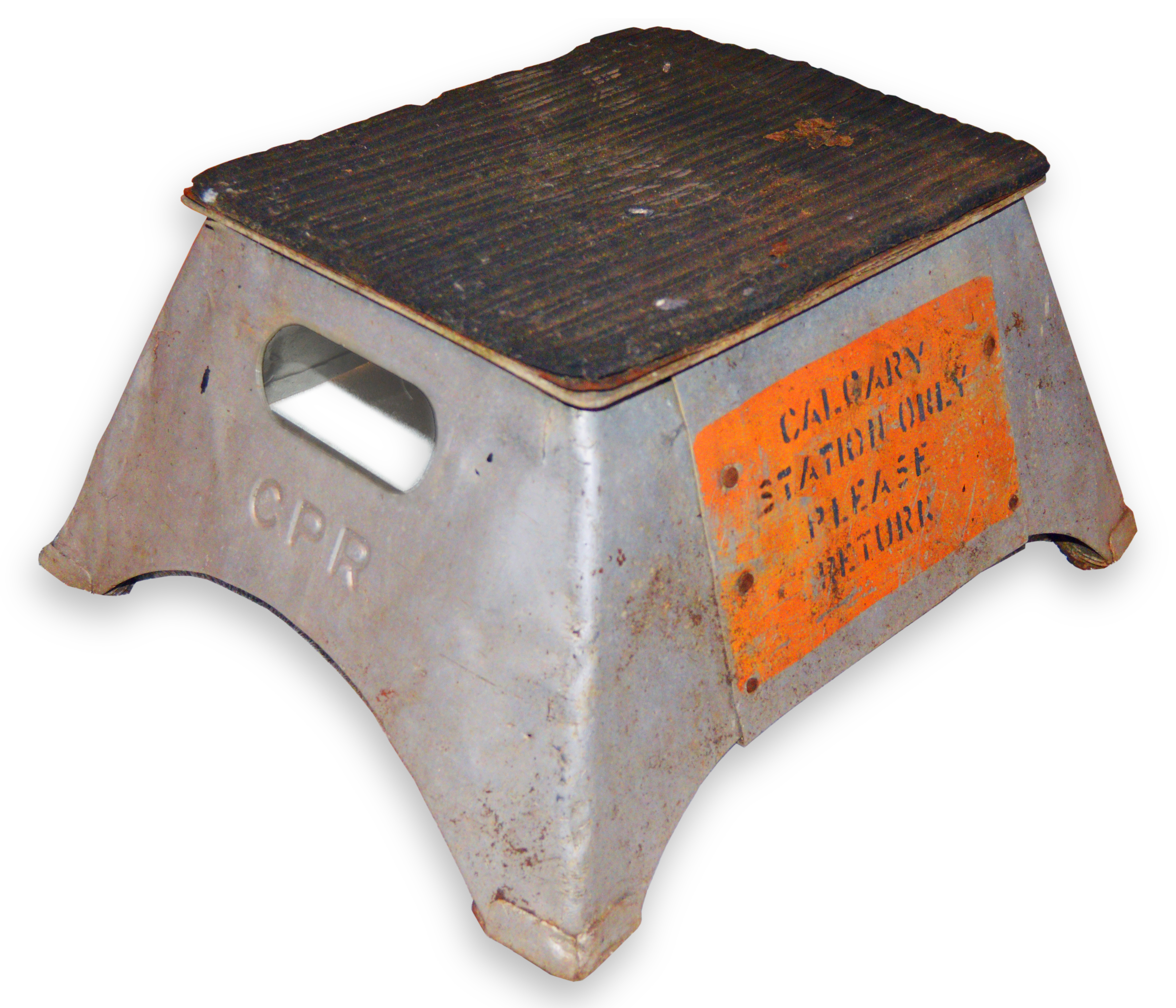
CPR train step stool (Calgary station) c. 1950

After the Second World War, the transportation industry in Canada changed. Where railways had previously provided almost universal freight and passenger services, cars, trucks and airplanes started to take traffic away from railways. This naturally helped the CPR's air and trucking operations, and the railway's freight operations continued to thrive hauling resource traffic and bulk commodities. However, passenger trains quickly became unprofitable. During the 1950s, the railway introduced new innovations in passenger service. In 1955, it introduced The Canadian, a new luxury transcontinental train. However, in the 1960s, the company started to pull out of passenger services, ending services on many of its branch lines. It also discontinued its secondary transcontinental train The Dominion in 1966, and in 1970, unsuccessfully applied to discontinue The Canadian. For the next eight years, it continued to apply to discontinue the service, and service on The Canadian declined markedly. On October 29, 1978, CP Rail transferred its passenger services to Via Rail, a new federal Crown corporation that is responsible for managing all intercity passenger service formerly handled by both CP Rail and CN. Via eventually took almost all of its passenger trains, including The Canadian, off CP's lines.

In 1968, as part of a corporate reorganization, each of the major operations, including its rail operations, were organized as separate subsidiaries. The name of the railway was changed to CP Rail, and the parent company changed its name to Canadian Pacific Limited in 1971. Its air, express, telecommunications, hotel and real estate holdings were spun off, and ownership of all of the companies transferred to Canadian Pacific Investments. The slogan was: "TO THE FOUR CORNERS OF THE WORLD". The company discarded its beaver logo, adopting the new Multimark (which, when mirrored by an adjacent "multi-mark" creates a diamond appearance on a globe) that was used – with a different colour background – for each of its operations.

=== 1979–2001 ===
==== The 1979 Mississauga train derailment ====
On November 10, 1979, a derailment of a hazardous materials train in Mississauga, Ontario, led to the evacuation of 200,000 people; there were no fatalities. Mississauga Mayor Hazel McCallion threatened to sue Canadian Pacific for the derailment. Part of the compromise was to accept GO Transit commuter rail service along the Galt Subdivision corridor up to Milton, Ontario. Limited trains ran along the Milton line on weekdays only. Expansions to Cambridge, Ontario may be coming in the future.

In 1984, CP Rail commenced construction of the Mount Macdonald Tunnel to augment the Connaught Tunnel under the Selkirk Mountains. The first revenue train passed through the tunnel in 1988. At 14.7 km (nine miles), it is the longest tunnel in the Americas. During the 1980s, the Soo Line Railroad, in which CP Rail still owned a controlling interest, underwent several changes. It acquired the Minneapolis, Northfield and Southern Railway in 1982. Then on February 21, 1985, the Soo Line obtained a controlling interest in the bankrupt Milwaukee Road, merging it into its system on January 1, 1986. Also in 1980, Canadian Pacific bought out the controlling interests of the Toronto, Hamilton and Buffalo Railway (TH&B) from Conrail and molded it into the Canadian Pacific System, dissolving the TH&B's name from the books in 1985. In 1987, most of CPR's trackage in the Great Lakes region, including much of the original Soo Line, were spun off into a new railway, the Wisconsin Central, which was subsequently purchased by CN. Influenced by the Canada-U.S. Free Trade Agreement of 1989, which liberalized trade between the two nations, the CPR's expansion continued during the early 1990s: CP Rail gained full control of the Soo Line in 1990, adding the "System" to the former's name, and bought the Delaware and Hudson Railway in 1991. These two acquisitions gave CP Rail routes to the major American cities of Chicago (via the Soo Line and Milwaukee Road as part of its historically logical route) and New York City (via the D&H).

During the 1990s, both CP Rail and CN attempted unsuccessfully to buy out the eastern assets of the other, so as to permit further rationalization. In 1996, CP Rail moved its head office from Windsor Station in Montreal to Gulf Canada Square in Calgary and changed its name back to Canadian Pacific Railway.

A new subsidiary company, the St. Lawrence and Hudson Railway, was created to operate its money-losing lines in eastern North America, covering Quebec, Southern and Eastern Ontario, trackage rights to Chicago, Illinois, (on Norfolk Southern lines from Detroit) as well as the Delaware and Hudson Railway in the northeastern United States. However, the new subsidiary, threatened with being sold off and free to innovate, quickly spun off money-losing track to short lines, instituted scheduled freight service, and produced an unexpected turn-around in profitability. On 1 January 2001 the StL&H was formally amalgamated with the CP Rail system.

=== 2001 to 2023 ===
In 2001, the CPR's parent company, Canadian Pacific Limited, spun off its five subsidiaries, including the CPR, into independent companies. In September 2007, CPR announced it was acquiring the Dakota, Minnesota and Eastern Railroad from London-based Electra Private Equity. The merger was completed as of October 31, 2008.

Canadian Pacific Railway Ltd. trains resumed regular operations on June 1, 2012, after a nine-day strike by some 4,800 locomotive engineers, conductors and traffic controllers who walked off the job on May 23, stalling Canadian freight traffic and costing the economy an estimated CA$80 million (US$77 million). The strike ended with a government back-to-work bill forcing both sides to come to a binding agreement.

On July 6, 2013, a unit train of crude oil which CP had subcontracted to short-line operator Montreal, Maine and Atlantic Railway derailed in Lac-Mégantic, killing 47. On August 14, 2013, the Quebec government added the CPR, along with lessor World Fuel Services (WFS), to the list of corporate entities from which it seeks reimbursement for the environmental cleanup of the Lac-Mégantic derailment. On July 15, the press reported that CP would appeal the legal order.

On October 12, 2014, it was reported that Canadian Pacific had tried to enter into a merger with American railway CSX, but was unsuccessful.

In 2015–16 Canadian Pacific sought to merge with American railway Norfolk Southern. and wanted to have a shareholder vote on it. CP ultimately terminated its efforts to merge on April 11, 2016.

On February 4, 2019, a loaded grain train ran away from the siding at Partridge just above the Upper Spiral Tunnel in Kicking Horse Pass. The 112-car grain train with three locomotives derailed into the Kicking Horse River just after the Trans Canada Highway overpass. The three crew members on the lead locomotive were killed. The Canadian Pacific Police Service (CPPS) investigated the fatal derailment. It later came to light that, although Canadian Pacific CEO Keith Creel said that the RCMP "retain jurisdiction" over the investigation, the RCMP wrote that "it never had jurisdiction because the crash happened on CP property". On January 26, 2020, Canadian current affairs program The Fifth Estate broadcast an episode on the derailment, and the next day the Canadian Transportation Safety Board (TSB) called for the RCMP to investigate as lead investigator Don Crawford said, "There is enough to suspect there's negligence here and it needs to be investigated by the proper authority".

On February 4, 2020, the TSB demoted its lead investigator in the crash probe after his superiors decided these comments were "completely inappropriate". The TSB stated that it "does not share the view of the lead safety investigator". The CPPS say they did a thorough investigation into the actions of the crew, which is now closed and resulted in no charges, while the Alberta Federation of Labour and the Teamsters Canada Rail Conference called for an independent police probe.

On November 20, 2019, it was announced that Canadian Pacific would purchase the Central Maine and Quebec Railway from Fortress Transportation and Infrastructure Investors. The line has had a series of different owners since being spun off of the Canadian Pacific in 1995. The first operator was the Canadian American Railroad a division of Iron Road Railways. In 2002 the Montreal, Maine & Atlantic took over operations after CDAC declared bankruptcy. The Central, Maine and Quebec Railway started operations in 2014 after the MMA declared bankruptcy due to the Lac-Mégantic derailment. On this new acquisition, CP CEO Keith Creel remarked that this gives CP a true coast-to-coast network across Canada and an increased presence in New England. On June 4, 2020; Canadian Pacific bought the Central Maine and Quebec.

==== Merger with Kansas City Southern (2021–2023) ====
On March 21, 2021, CP announced that it was planning to purchase the Kansas City Southern Railway (KCS) for US$29 billion. The US Surface Transportation Board (STB) would first have to approve the purchase, which was expected to be completed by the middle of 2022.

However, a competing cash and stock offer was later made by Canadian National Railway (CN) on April 20 at $33.7 billion. On 13 May, KCS announced that they planned to accept the merger offer from CN, but would give CP until May 21 to come up with a higher bid. On May 21, KCS and CN agreed to a merger. However, CN's merger attempt was blocked by a STB ruling in August that the company could not use a voting trust to assume control of KCS, due to concerns about potentially reduced competition in the railroad industry.

On September 12, KCS accepted a new $31 billion offer from CP. Though CP's offer was lower than the offer made by CN, the STB permitted CP to use a voting trust to take control of KCS. The voting trust allowed CP to become the beneficial owner of KCS in December, but the two railroads operated independently until receiving approval for a merger of operations from the STB. That approval came on March 15, 2023, which permitted the railroads to merge as soon as April 14. On April 14, 2023, KCS officially became a subsidiary of CPR, and CPR with its subsidiaries began conducting business under the name of its parent company, Canadian Pacific Kansas City (CPKC).

== Freight trains ==
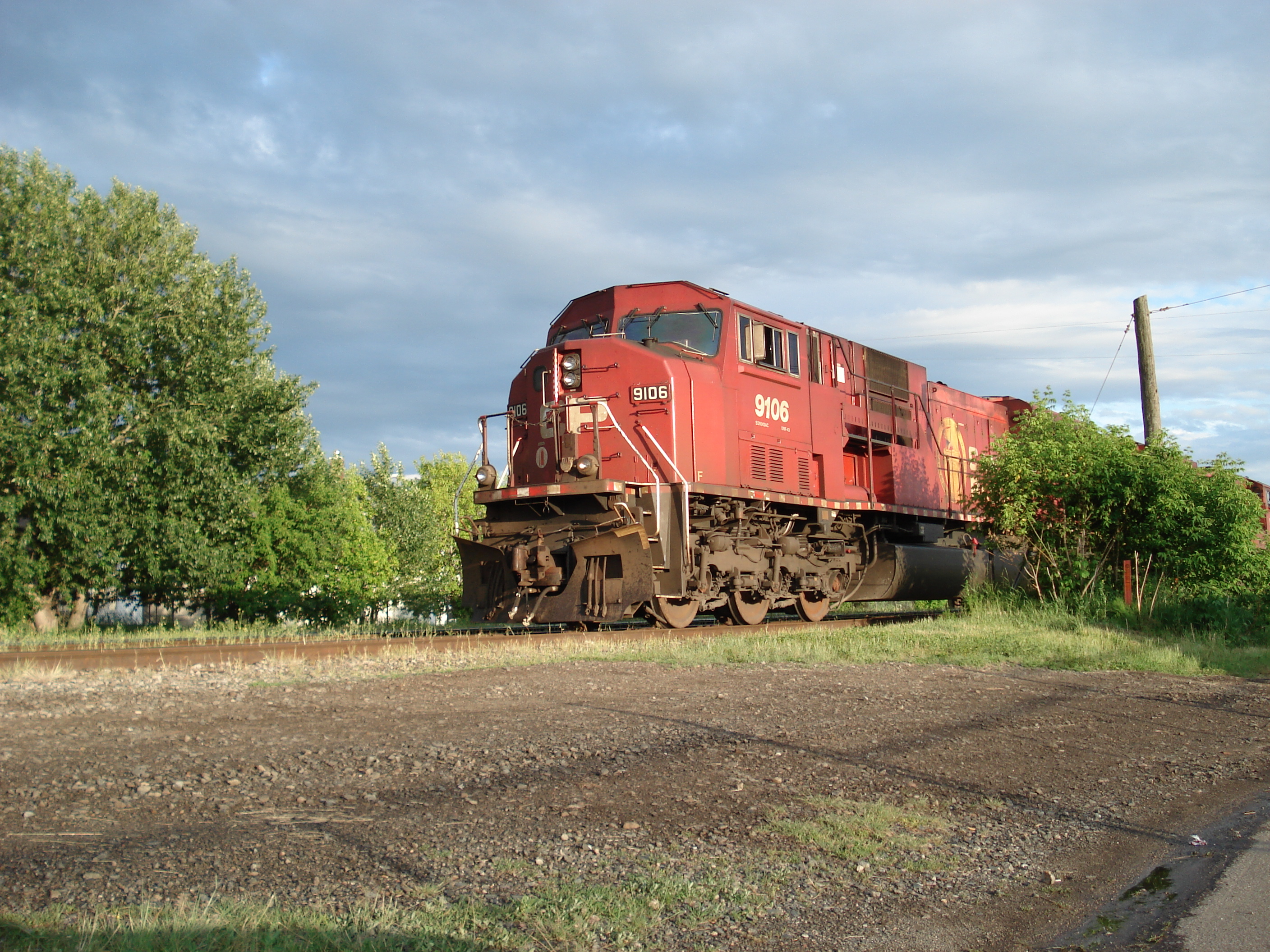
CP EMD SD90MAC locomotive in Thunder Bay, Ontario

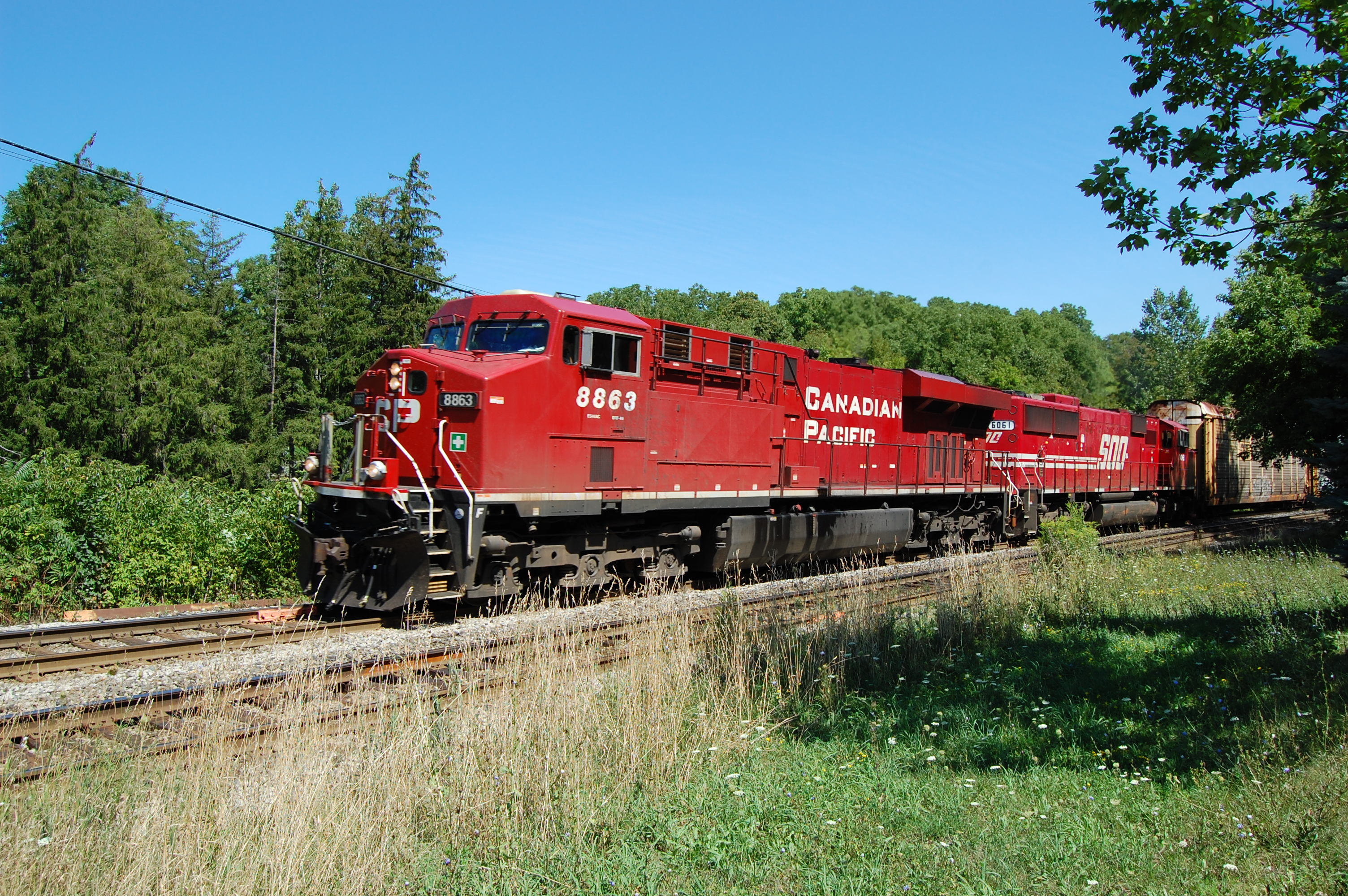
GE ES44AC CP 8863 in Campbellville, Ontario

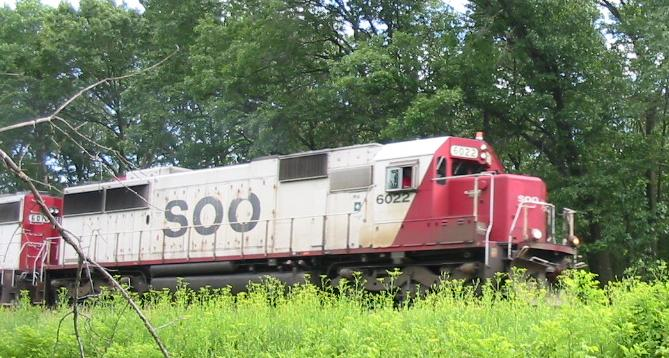
Soo Line 6022, an EMD SD60, pulls a train through Wisconsin Dells, Wisconsin, June 20, 2004.

Over half of CP's freight traffic is in grain (24% of 2016 freight revenue), intermodal freight (22%), and coal (10%) and the vast majority of its profits are made in western Canada. A major shift in trade from the Atlantic to the Pacific has caused serious drops in CPR's wheat shipments through Thunder Bay. It also ships chemicals and plastics (12% of 2016 revenue), automotive parts and assembled automobiles (6%), potash (6%), sulphur and other fertilizers (5%), forest products (5%), and various other products (11%). The busiest part of its railway network is along its main line between Calgary and Vancouver. Since 1970, coal has become a major commodity hauled by CPR. Coal is shipped in unit trains from coal mines in the mountains, including Sparwood, British Columbia, to terminals at Roberts Bank and North Vancouver, from where it is then shipped to Japan.

Grain is hauled by the CPR from the prairies to ports at Thunder Bay (the former cities of Fort William and Port Arthur), Quebec City and Vancouver, where it is then shipped overseas. The traditional winter export port was Saint John, New Brunswick, when ice closed the St. Lawrence River. Grain has always been a significant commodity hauled by the CPR; between 1905 and 1909, the CPR double-tracked its section of track between Fort William (part of present-day Thunder Bay) and Winnipeg to facilitate grain shipments. For several decades this was the only long stretch of double-track mainline outside of urban areas on the CPR. Today, though the Thunder Bay-Winnipeg section is now single tracked, the CPR still has two long distance double track lines serving rural areas, including a 121-kilometre (75 mi) stretch between Kent, British Columbia, and Vancouver which follows the Fraser River into the Coast Mountains, as well as the Canadian Pacific Winchester Sub, a 160-kilometre (100 mi) stretch of double track mainline which runs from Smiths Falls, Ontario, through downtown Montreal which runs through many rural farming communities. However, CPR was, as of 2020, partially dismantling the stretch of double track mainline on the Winchester Sub.

== Passenger trains ==
The train was the primary mode of long-distance transport in Canada until the 1960s. Among the many types of people who rode CPR trains were new immigrants heading for the prairies, military troops (especially during the two world wars) and upper class tourists. It also custom-built many of its passenger cars at its CPR Angus Shops to be able to meet the demands of the upper class.

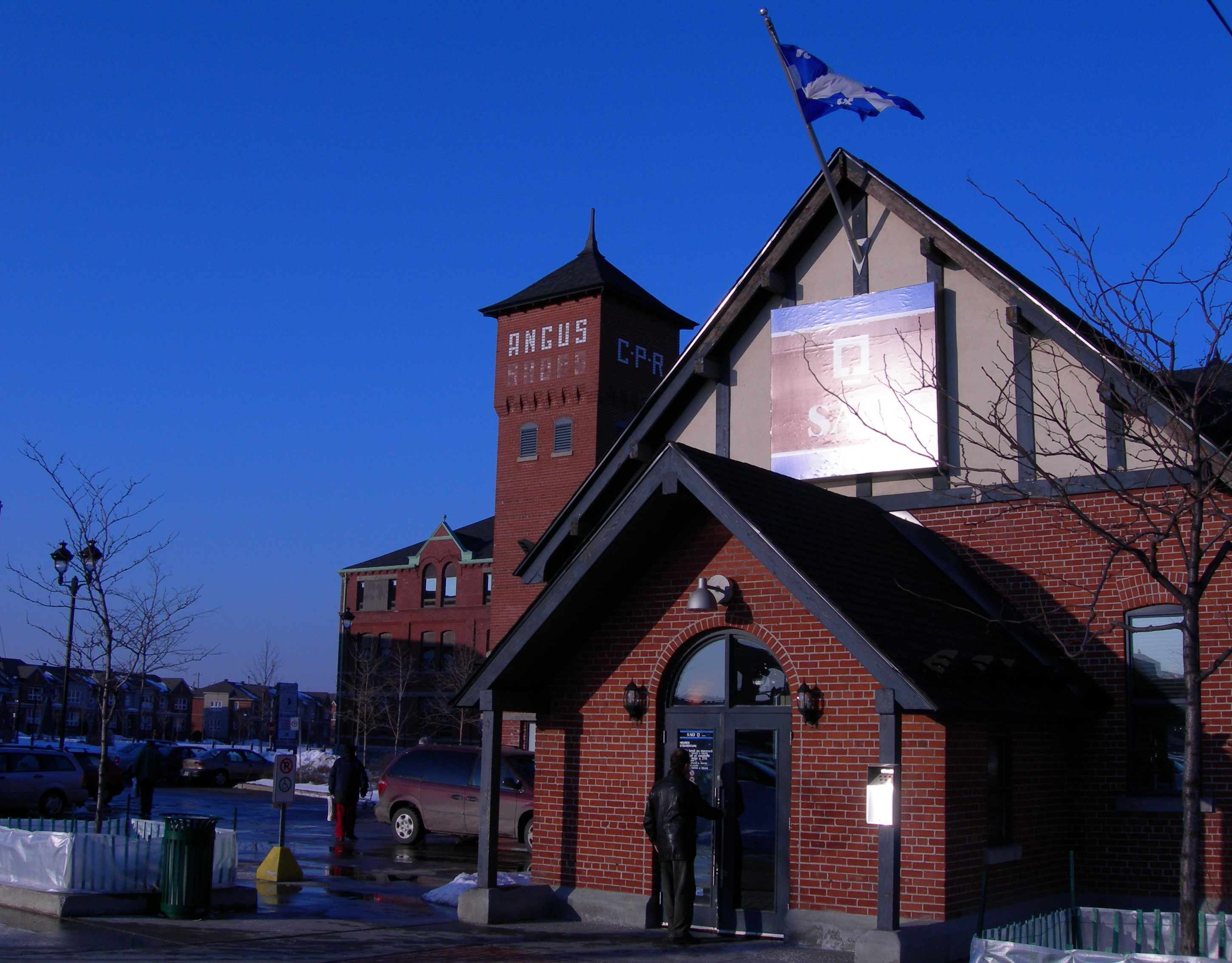
An Angus Shops building converted into an SAQ liquor store

The CPR also had a line of Great Lakes ships integrated into its transcontinental service. From 1884 until 1912, these ships linked Owen Sound on Georgian Bay to Fort William. Following a major fire in December 1911 that destroyed the grain elevator, operations were relocated to a new, larger port created by the CPR at Port McNicoll opening in May 1912. Five ships allowed daily service, and included the S.S. Assiniboia and S.S. Keewatin built in 1907 which remained in use until the end of service. Travellers went by train from Toronto to that Georgian Bay port, then travelled by ship to link with another train at the Lakehead. After World War II, the trains and ships carried automobiles as well as passengers. This service featured what was to become the last boat train in North America. The Steam Boat was a fast, direct connecting train between Toronto and Port McNicoll. The passenger service was discontinued at the end of season in 1965 with one ship, the Assiniboia, carrying on in freight service for two more years before being sold. Planned to be a floating restaurant, "Assiniboia" caught fire during renovations in 1969 and was subsequently scrapped. Meanwhile "Keewatin" which was laid up in 1966 and scheduled to be scrapped, was purchased by RJ and Diane Peterson in 1967 and towed to their marina in Douglas, Michigan to serve as a marine museum. Forty-five years later Skyline International CEO Gil Blutrich purchased "Keewatin" and engaged former crewman Eric Conroy to repatriate "Keewatin" to Port McNicoll and operate her as an historical attraction, which he did in 2012 through 2019. "Keewatin" was closed to visitors in 2020 as a result of the COVID-19 pandemic and did not reopen in Port McNicoll. In 2023 "Keewatin" was donated by Skyline to the Marine Museum of the Great Lakes at Kingston, and towed to Hamilton shipyards for restoration before proceeding to Kingston, where it reopened to visitors in 2024.

After the Second World War, passenger traffic declined as automobiles and airplanes became more common, but the CPR continued to innovate in an attempt to keep passenger numbers up. Beginning November 9, 1953, the CPR introduced Budd Rail Diesel Cars (RDCs) on many of its lines. Officially called "Dayliners" by the CPR, they were always referred to as Budd Cars by employees. Greatly reduced travel times and reduced costs resulted, which saved service on many lines for a number of years. The CPR went on to acquire the second largest fleet of RDCs totalling 52 cars. Only the Boston and Maine Railroad had more. This CPR fleet also included the rare model RDC-4 (which consisted of a mail section at one end and a baggage section at the other end with no formal passenger section). On April 24, 1955, the CPR introduced a new luxury transcontinental passenger train, The Canadian. The train provided service between Vancouver and Toronto or Montreal (east of Sudbury; the train was in two sections). The train, which operated on an expedited schedule, was pulled by diesel locomotives, and used new, streamlined, stainless steel rolling stock. This service was initially heavily promoted by the company and many images of the train, especially as it traversed the Canadian Rockies, were captured by CPR's official photographer Nicholas Morant. Featured in numerous advertising promotions worldwide, several such images have gained iconic status.

Starting in the 1960s, however, the railway started to discontinue much of its passenger service, particularly on its branch lines. For example, passenger service ended on its line through southern British Columbia and Crowsnest Pass in January 1964, and on its Quebec Central in April 1967, and the transcontinental train The Dominion was dropped in January 1966. On October 29, 1978, CP Rail transferred its passenger services to Via Rail, a new federal Crown corporation that was now responsible for intercity passenger services in Canada. Canadian Prime Minister Brian Mulroney presided over major cuts in Via Rail service on January 15, 1990. This ended service by The Canadian over CPR rails, and the train was rerouted on the former Super Continental route via Canadian National without a change of name. Where both trains had been daily prior to January 15, 1990, cuts, the surviving Canadian was only a three-times-weekly operation. In October 2012, The Canadian was reduced to twice-weekly for the six-month off-season period, and as of 2025 operates three-times-weekly for only six months a year. In addition to inter-city passenger services, the CPR also provided commuter rail services in Montreal. CP Rail introduced Canada's first bi-level passenger cars here in 1970. On October 1, 1982, the Montreal Urban Community Transit Commission (STCUM) assumed responsibility for the commuter services previously provided by CP Rail. It continues under the Metropolitan Transportation Agency (AMT).

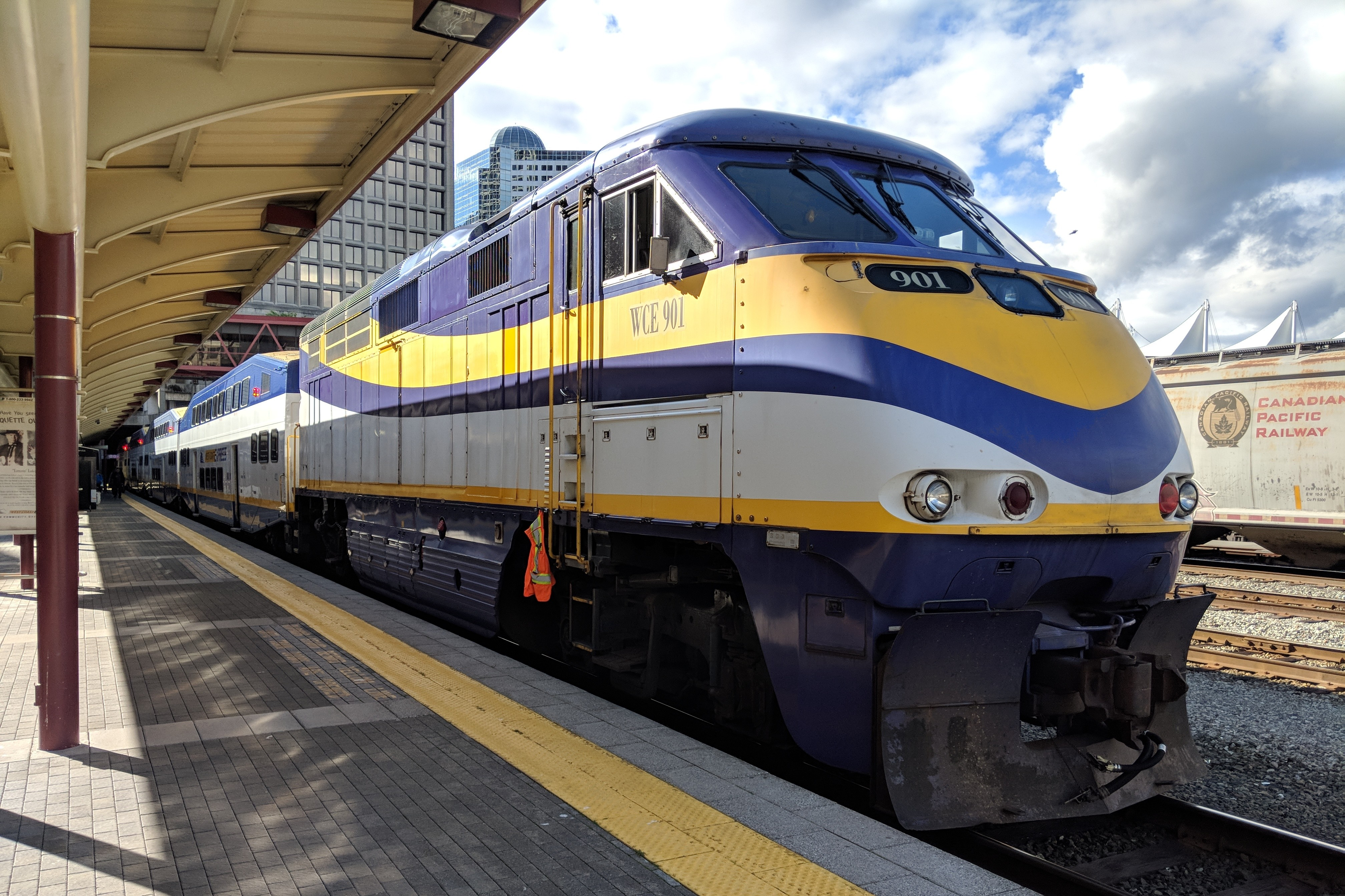
West Coast Express at Waterfront station in Vancouver

As of 2025 Canadian Pacific Railway operates two commuter services under contract. GO Transit contracts CPR to operate 10 return trips between Milton and central Toronto in Ontario. In Montreal, 59 daily commuter trains run on CPR lines from Lucien-L'Allier station to Candiac, Hudson and Blainville–Saint-Jérôme on behalf of the AMT. CP no longer operates Vancouver's West Coast Express on behalf of TransLink, a regional transit authority. Bombardier Transportation assumed control of train operations on May 5, 2014. Although CP Rail no longer owns the track nor operates the commuter trains, it handles dispatching of Metra trains on the Milwaukee District North and Milwaukee District West Lines in Chicago, on which the CP also provides freight service via trackage rights.

=== Sleeping, Dining and Parlour Car Department ===
Sleeping cars were operated by a separate department of the railway that included the dining and parlour cars and aptly named as the Sleeping, Dining and Parlour Car Department. The CPR decided from the very beginning that it would operate its own sleeping cars, unlike railways in the United States that depended upon independent companies that specialized in providing cars and porters, including building the cars themselves. Pullman was long a famous name in this regard; its Pullman porters were legendary. Other early companies included the Wagner Palace Car Company. Bigger-sized berths and more comfortable surroundings were built by order of the CPR's General Manager, William Cornelius Van Horne, who was a large man himself. Providing and operating their own cars allowed better control of the service provided as well as keeping all of the revenue received, although dining-car services were never profitable. But railway managers realized that those who could afford to travel great distances expected such facilities, and their favourable opinion would bode well to attracting others to Canada and the CPR's trains.

== Express ==
W. C. Van Horne decided from the very beginning that the CPR would retain as much revenue from its various operations as it could. This translated into keeping express, telegraph, sleeping car and other lines of business for themselves, creating separate departments or companies as necessary. This was necessary as the fledgling railway would need all the income it could get, and in addition, he saw some of these ancillary operations such as express and telegraph as being quite profitable. Others such as sleeping and dining cars were kept in order to provide better control over the quality of service being provided to passengers. Hotels were likewise crucial to the CPR's growth by attracting travellers.

Dominion Express Company was formed independently in 1873 before the CPR itself, although train service did not begin until the summer of 1882 at which time it operated over some 500 kilometres (300 mi) of track from Rat Portage (Kenora) Ontario west to Winnipeg, Manitoba. It was soon absorbed into the CPR and expanded everywhere the CPR went. It was renamed Canadian Pacific Express Company on September 1, 1926, and the headquarters moved from Winnipeg, to Toronto, and the company also handled the establishment of the first money order system in Canada. It was operated as a separate company with the railway charging them to haul express cars on trains, and was initially highly profitable.

Express operations consisted of separate cars included on existing Canadian Pacific routes, were typically charged on a less-than-carload basis, and transported a wide range of goods, including fresh goods like dairy or flowers, refrigerated goods such as fish, transport of cash and jewellery, livestock with handlers and in some cases goods that took an entire carload, such as automobiles.

The company later expanded to shipping by transport truck. The company eventually became unprofitable, possibly due to competition from trucking companies, was purchased by an employee buyout in 1994 and renamed itself Interlink Systems. The company failed quickly, and went into receivership in 1997.

== Special trains ==
=== Silk trains ===
Between the 1890s and 1933, the CPR transported raw silk from Vancouver, where it had been shipped from the Orient, to silk mills in New York and New Jersey. A silk train could carry several million dollars' worth of silk, so they had their own armed guards. To avoid train robberies and so minimize insurance costs, they travelled quickly and stopped only to change locomotives and crews, which was often done in under five minutes. The silk trains had right over all other trains; even passenger trains (including the royal train of 1939) would be put in sidings to make the silk trains' trip faster. At the end of World War II, the invention of nylon made silk less valuable, so the silk trains died out.

=== Funeral trains ===
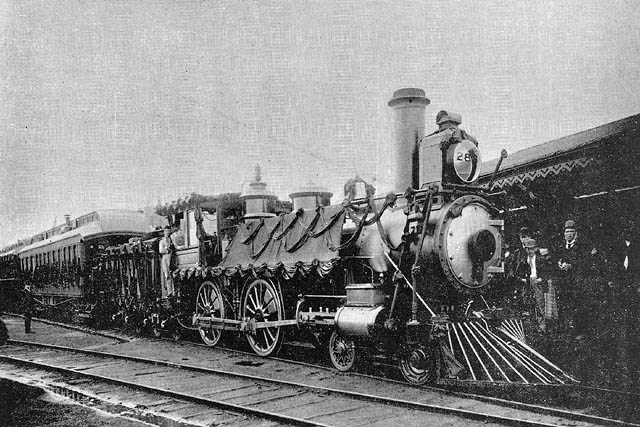
Funeral train of Prime Minister Sir John A. Macdonald

Funeral trains would carry the remains of important people, such as prime ministers. As the train would pass, mourners would be at certain spots to show respect. Two of the CPR's funeral trains are particularly well-known. On June 10, 1891, the funeral train of Prime Minister Sir John A. Macdonald ran from Ottawa to Kingston, Ontario. The train consisted of five heavily draped passenger cars and was pulled by 4-4-0 No. 283. On September 14, 1915, the funeral train of former CPR president Sir William Cornelius Van Horne ran from Montreal to Joliet, Illinois, pulled by 4-6-2 No. 2213.

=== Royal trains ===
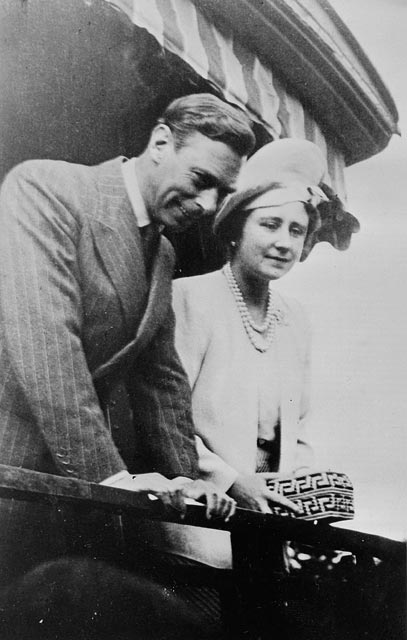
King George VI and Queen Elizabeth at Hope, British Columbia

The CPR ran a number of trains that transported members of the Canadian royal family when they toured the country, taking them through Canada's scenery, forests, and small towns, and enabling people to see and greet them. Their trains were elegantly decorated; some had amenities such as a post office and barber shop. The CPR's most notable royal train was in 1939, when the CPR and the CNR had the honour of carrying King George VI and Queen Elizabeth during their coast-to-coast-and-back tour of Canada; one company took the royal couple from Quebec City to Vancouver and the other company took them on the return journey to Halifax. This was the first tour of Canada by its reigning monarch. The steam locomotives used to pull the train included CPR 2850, a Hudson (4-6-4) built by Montreal Locomotive Works in 1938, CNR 6400, a U-4-a Northern (4-8-4) and CNR 6028 a U-1-b Mountain (4-8-2) type. They were specially painted royal blue, with the exception of CNR 6028 which was not painted, with silver trim as was the entire train. The locomotives ran 5,189 km (3,224 mi) across Canada, through 25 changes of crew, without engine failure. The King, somewhat of a railbuff, rode in the cab when possible. After the tour, King George gave the CPR permission to use the term "Royal Hudson" for the CPR locomotives and to display Royal Crowns on their running boards. This applied only to the semi-streamlined locomotives (2820–2864), not the "standard" Hudsons (2800–2819).

=== Better Farming Train ===
CPR provided the rolling stock for the Better Farming Train which toured rural Saskatchewan between 1914 and 1922 to promote the latest information on agricultural research. It was staffed by the University of Saskatchewan and operating expenses were covered by the Department of Agriculture.

=== School cars ===
Between 1927 and the early 1950s, the CPR ran a school car to reach children who lived in Northern Ontario, far from schools. A teacher would travel in a specially designed car to remote areas and would stay to teach in one area for two to three days, then leave for another area. Each car had a blackboard and a few sets of chairs and desks. They also contained miniature libraries and accommodation for the teacher.

=== Silver Streak ===
Major shooting for the 1976 film Silver Streak, a fictional comedy tale of a murder-ridden train trip from Los Angeles to Chicago, was done on the CPR, mainly in the Alberta area with station footage at Toronto's Union Station. The train set was so lightly disguised as the fictional "AMRoad" that the locomotives and cars still carried their original names and numbers, along with the easily identifiable CP Rail red-striped paint scheme. Most of the cars are still in revenue service on Via Rail Canada; the lead locomotive (CP 4070) and the second unit (CP 4067) were sold to Via Rail and CTCUM respectively.

=== Holiday Train ===
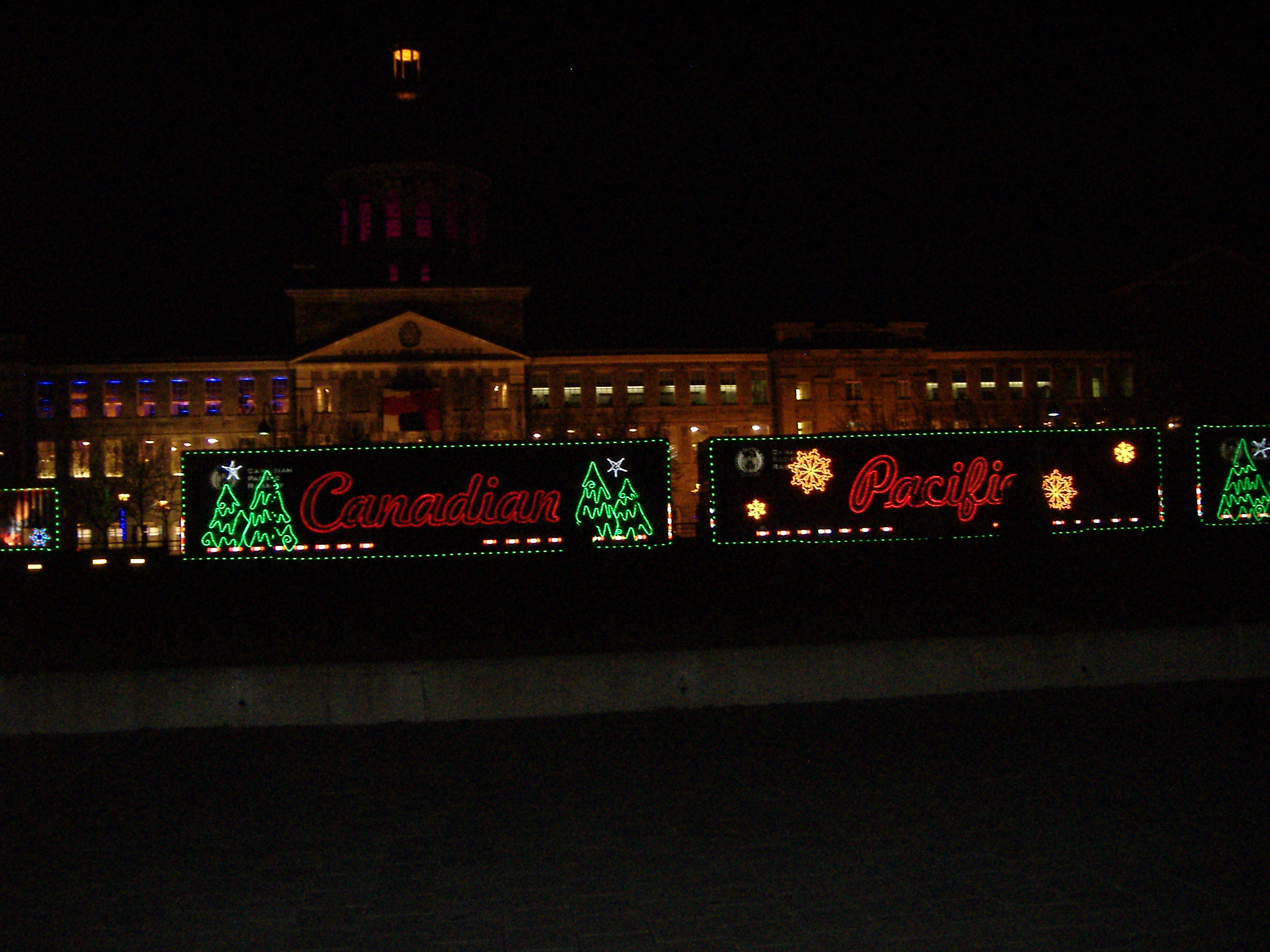
Holiday Train in Montreal, November 2009

Starting in 1999, CP runs a Holiday Train along its main line during the months of November and December. The Holiday Train celebrates the holiday season and collects donations for community food banks and hunger issues. The Holiday Train also provides publicity for CP and a few of its customers. Each train has a box car stage for entertainers who are travelling along with the train.

The train is a freight train, but also pulls vintage passenger cars which are used as lodging/transportation for the crew and entertainers. Only entertainers and CP employees are allowed to board the train aside from a coach car that takes employees and their families from one stop to the next. All donations collected in a community remain in that community for distribution.

There are two Holiday Trains that cover 150 stops in Canada and the United States Northeast and Midwest. Each train is roughly 1,000 feet (300 m) in length with brightly decorated railway cars, including a modified box car that has been turned into a travelling stage for performers. They are each decorated with hundred of thousands of LED Christmas lights. In 2013 to celebrate the program's 15th year, three signature events were held in Hamilton, Ontario; Calgary, Alberta; and Cottage Grove, Minnesota, to further raise awareness for hunger issues.

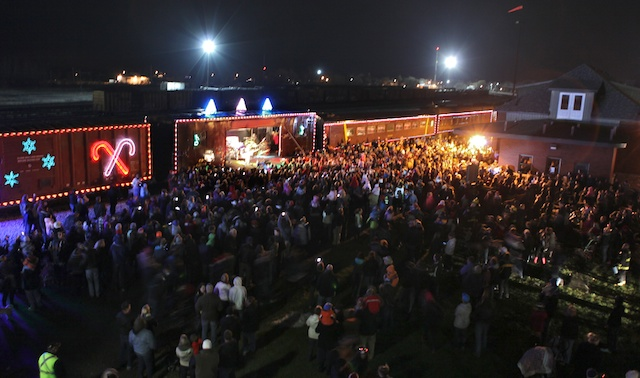
A crowd watches entertainers perform out of the CP Holiday Train

The trains feature different entertainers each year; in 2016, one train featured Dallas Smith and the Odds, while the other featured Colin James and Kelly Prescott. After its 20th anniversary tour in 2018, which hosted Terri Clark, Sam Roberts Band, The Trews and Willy Porter, the tour reported to have raised more than CA$15.8 million and collected more than 4.5 million pounds (2,000 t) of food since 1999.

=== Royal Canadian Pacific ===
On June 7, 2000, the CPR inaugurated the Royal Canadian Pacific, a luxury excursion service that operates between the months of June and September. It operates along a 1,050 km (650 mi) route from Calgary, through the Columbia Valley in British Columbia, and returning to Calgary via Crowsnest Pass. The trip takes six days and five nights. The train consists of up to eight luxury passenger cars built between 1916 and 1931 and is powered by first-generation diesel locomotives.

=== Steam train ===
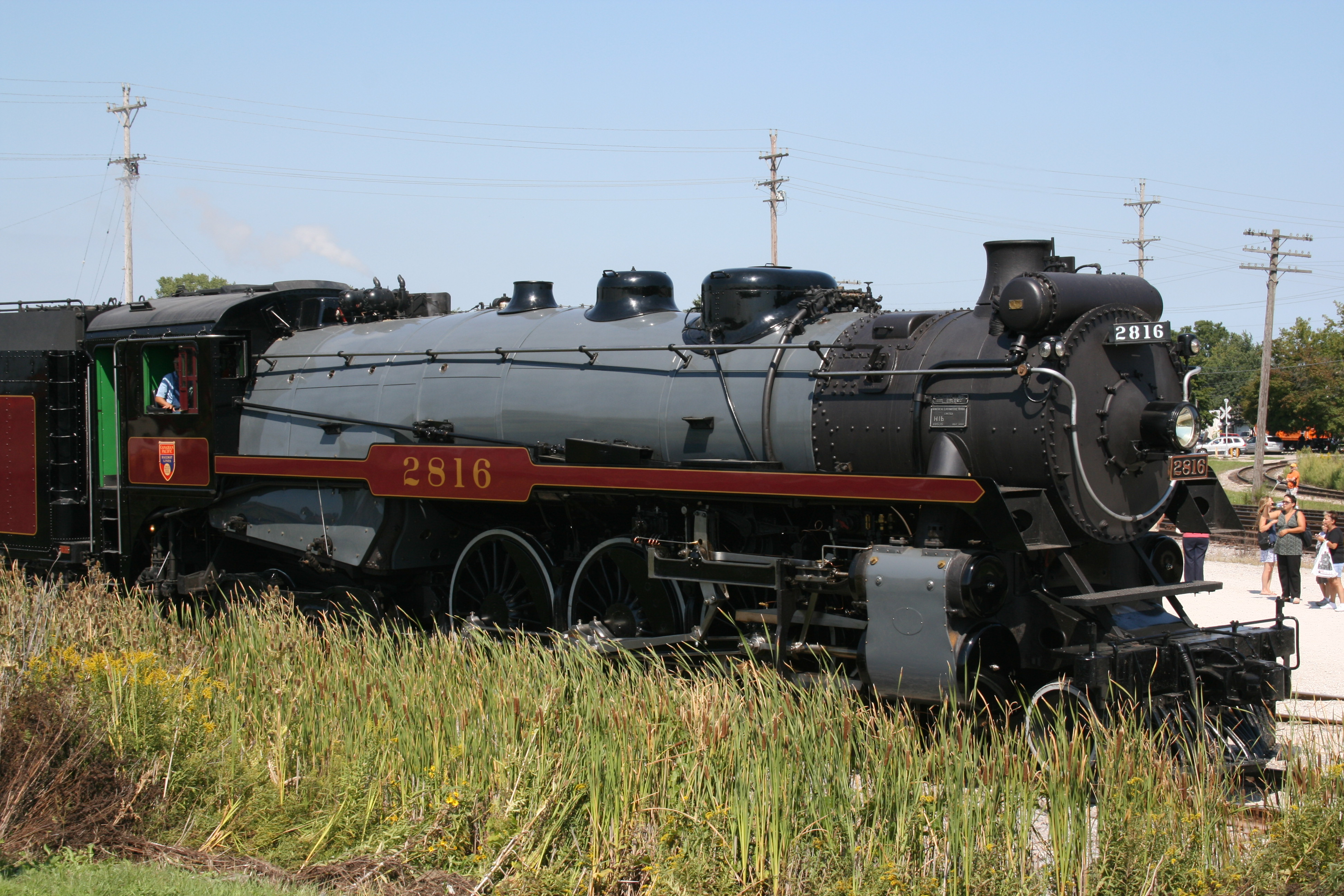
Canadian Pacific 2816 Empress at Sturtevant, Wisconsin, September 1, 2007

In 1998, the CPR repatriated one of its former passenger steam locomotives that had been on static display in the United States following its sale in January 1964, long after the close of the steam era. CPR Hudson 2816 was re-designated Empress 2816 following a 30-month restoration that cost in excess of $1 million. It was subsequently returned to service to promote public relations. It has operated across much of the CPR system, including lines in the U.S. and been used for various charitable purposes; 100% of the money raised goes to the nationwide charity Breakfast for Learning — the CPR bears all of the expenses associated with the operation of the train. 2816 is the subject of Rocky Mountain Express, a 2011 IMAX film which follows the locomotive on an eastbound journey beginning in Vancouver, and which tells the story of the building of the CPR. 2816 has been stored indefinitely since 2012 after CEO E. Hunter Harrison discontinued the steam program.

The locomotive was fired up on November 13, 2020, for a steam test and moved around the Ogden campus yard. At the time, CP had plans to utilize the locomotive only for a special Holiday Train at Home broadcast, after which it was put in storage. However, in mid-2021, CEO Keith Creel announced intentions to bring 2816 back to full operational status, for a tour from their Calgary headquarters to Mexico City, if the merger with Kansas City Southern Railway was approved by the Surface Transportation Board in the United States. Work on the needed overhaul began in earnest in late 2021 for a planned date in 2023. On April 24, 2024, No. 2816 began its Final Spike Steam Tour for the Canadian Pacific Kansas City, running from Calgary to Mexico City.

=== Spirit Train ===
In 2008, Canadian Pacific partnered with the 2010 Olympic and Paralympic Winter Games to present a "Spirit Train" tour that featured Olympic-themed events at various stops. Colin James was a headline entertainer. Several stops were met by protesters who argued that the games were slated to take place on stolen indigenous land.

=== CP Canada 150 Train ===
In 2017, CP ran the CP Canada 150 Train from Port Moody to Ottawa to celebrate Canada's 150th year since Confederation. The train stopped in 13 cities along its 3-week summer tour, offering a free block party and concert from Dean Brody, Kelly Prescott and Dallas Arcand. The heritage train drew out thousands to sign the special "Spirit of Tomorrow" car, where children were invited to write their wishes for the future of Canada and send them to Ottawa. Prime Minister Justin Trudeau and daughter Ella-Grace Trudeau also visited the train and rode it from Revelstoke to Calgary.

== Non-railway services ==
Historically, Canadian Pacific operated several non-railway businesses. In 1971, these businesses were split off into the separate company Canadian Pacific Limited, and in 2001, that company was further split into five companies. CP no longer provides any of these services.

=== Canadian Pacific Telegraphs ===
The original charter of the CPR granted in 1881 provided for the right to create an electric telegraph and telephone service including charging for it. The telephone had barely been invented but telegraph was well established as a means of communicating quickly across great distances. Being allowed to sell this service meant the railway could offset the costs of constructing and maintaining a pole line along its tracks across vast distances for its own purposes which were largely for dispatching trains. It began doing so in 1882 as the separate Telegraph Department. It would go on to provide a link between the cables under the Atlantic and Pacific oceans when they were completed. Before the CPR line, messages to the west could be sent only via the United States.

Paid for by the word, the telegram was an expensive way to send messages, but they were vital to businesses. An individual receiving a personal telegram was seen as being someone important except for those that transmitted sorrow in the form of death notices. Messengers on bicycles delivered telegrams and picked up a reply in cities. In smaller locations, the local railway station agent would handle this on a commission basis. To speed things, at the local end messages would first be telephoned. In 1931, it became the Communications Department in recognition of the expanding services provided which included telephones lines, news wire, ticker quotations for capital stocks and eventually teleprinters. All were faster than mail and very important to business and the public alike for many decades before mobile phones and computers came along. It was the coming of these newer technologies especially cellular telephones that eventually resulted in the demise of these services even after formation in 1967 of CN-CP Telecommunications in an effort to effect efficiencies through consolidation rather than competition. Deregulation in the 1980s, brought about mergers and the sale of remaining services and facilities.

=== Canadian Pacific Radio ===
Canadian Pacific Radio was a Canadian radio network operated by the Canadian Pacific Railway from 1930 to 1935. Established to compete with CNR Radio, its programming was carried by as many as 21 stations across Canada.

On January 17, 1930, the CPR applied for licences to operate radio stations in 11 cities across Canada. Its rival, Canadian National Railways, used CNR Radio to promote its services and entertain passengers. The Great Depression undermined the CPR's plans, and in April it withdrew its applications for all cities except Toronto, Montreal and Winnipeg. It did not proceed with the remaining applications.

Instead, the CPR operated a phantom radio station in Toronto, initially licensed as CHRY and subsequently renamed CPRY, standing for "Canadian Pacific Royal York". The station used studios at the railway's Royal York Hotel and leased airtime on CFRB and CKGW. Its programs were distributed to affiliated stations, with some broadcasts also carried by WJZ and its affiliated stations in the United States.

The transfer of CNR Radio to the Canadian Radio Broadcasting Commission removed the CPR's principal competitive reason for operating a network. Canadian Pacific Radio ceased operations in 1935.

CPR programming included orchestral concerts from Montreal conducted by Douglas Clarke and the Concert Orchestra broadcasts from the Royal York Hotel under Rex Battle. Imperial Oil sponsored another concert series from the hotel, conducted by Reginald Stewart, with a 55-piece orchestra and guest soloists.

Battle's first national series for the railway ran from February to May 1930. That autumn, he began conducting the weekly Canadian Pacific Hour of Music, which ran for 30 weeks. Broadcasts by Fred Culley's dance band from the Royal York usually followed the program.

=== Canadian Pacific Steamships ===
Steamships played an important part in the history of CP from the very earliest days. During construction of the line in British Columbia even before the private CPR took over from the government contractor, ships were used to bring supplies to the construction sites. Similarly, to reach the isolated area of Superior in northern Ontario ships were used to bring in supplies to the construction work. While this work was going on there was already regular passenger service to the West. Trains operated from Toronto to Owen Sound where CPR steamships connected to Fort William where trains once again operated to reach Winnipeg. Before the CPR was completed the only way to reach the West was through the United States via St. Paul and Winnipeg. This Great Lakes steam ship service continued as an alternative route for many years and was always operated by the railway. Canadian Pacific passenger service on the lakes ended in 1965.

In 1883, CPR began purchasing sailing ships as part of a railway supply service on the Great Lakes. Over time, CPR became a railway company with widely organized water transportation auxiliaries including the Great Lakes service, the trans-Pacific service, the Pacific coastal service, the British Columbia lake and river service, the trans-Atlantic service and the Bay of Fundy Ferry service. In the 20th century, the company evolved into an intercontinental railway which operated two transoceanic services which connected Canada with Europe and with Asia. The range of CPR services were aspects of an integrated plan.

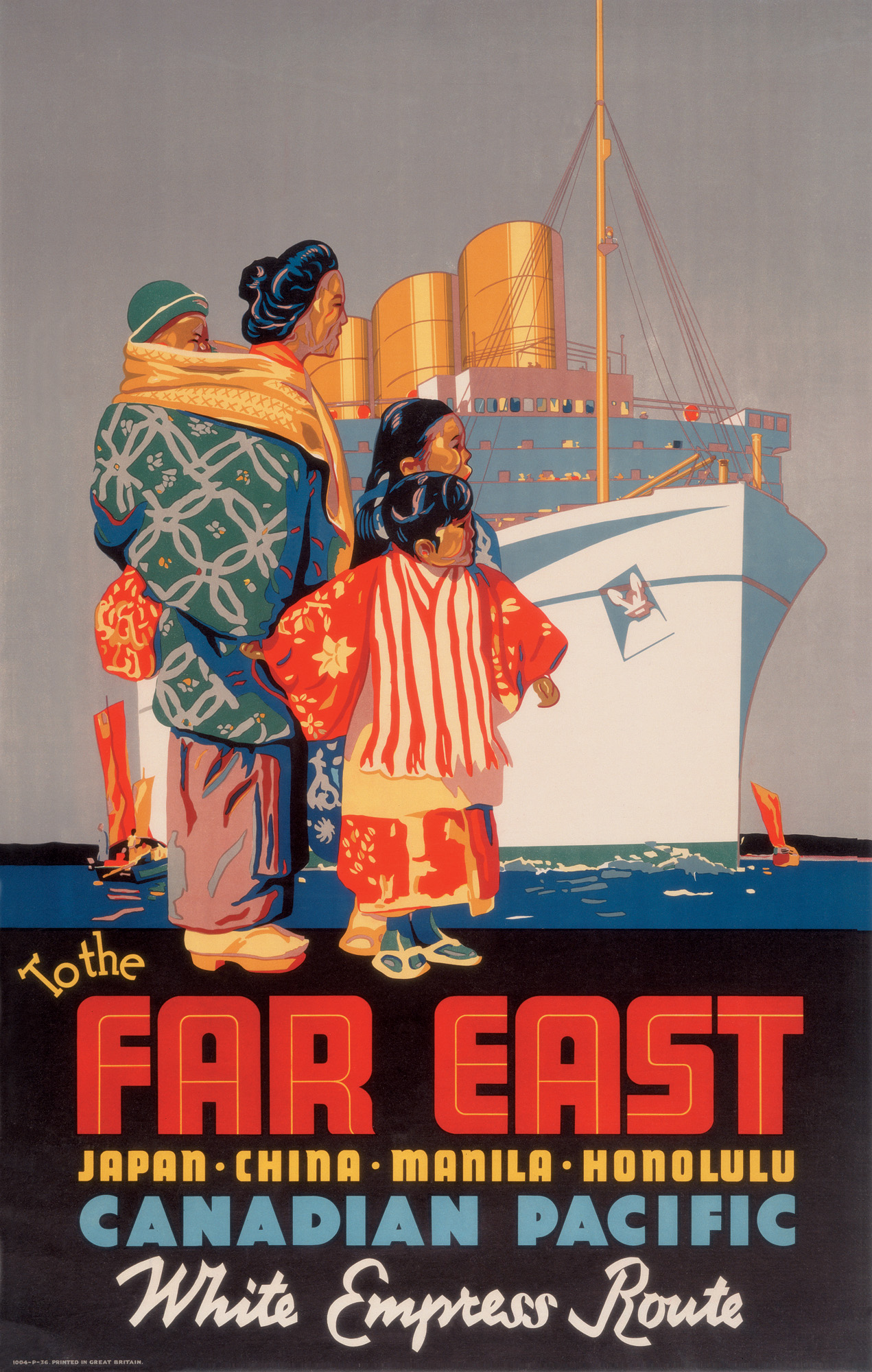
Advertisement for Canadian Pacific steamships to the Far East, 1936

Once the railway was completed to British Columbia, the CPR chartered and soon bought their own passenger steamships as a link to the Orient. These sleek steamships were of the latest design and christened with "Empress" names (e. g., RMS Empress of Britain, Empress of Canada, Empress of Australia, and so forth). Travel to and from the Orient and cargo, especially imported tea and silk, were an important source of revenue, aided by Royal Mail contracts. This was an important part of the All-Red Route linking the various parts of the British Empire.

The other ocean part was the Atlantic service to and from the United Kingdom, which began with acquisition of two existing lines, Beaver Line, owned by Elder Dempster and Allan Lines. These two segments became Canadian Pacific Ocean Services (later, Canadian Pacific Steamships) and operated separately from the various lake services operated in Canada, which were considered to be a direct part of the railway's operations. These trans-ocean routes made it possible to travel from Britain to Hong Kong using only the CPR's ships, trains and hotels. CP's 'Empress' ships became world-famous for their luxury and speed. They had a practical role, too, in transporting immigrants from much of Europe to Canada, especially to populate the vast prairies. They also played an important role in both world wars with many of them being lost to enemy action, including Empress of Britain.

There were also a number of rail ferries operated over the years as well including, between Windsor, Ontario, and Detroit from 1890 until 1915. This began with two paddle-wheelers capable of carrying 16 cars. Passenger cars were carried as well as freight. This service ended in 1915 when the CPR made an agreement with the Michigan Central to use their Detroit River tunnel opened in 1910. Pennsylvania-Ontario Transportation Company was formed jointly with the PRR in 1906 to operate a ferry across Lake Erie between Ashtabula, Ohio, and Port Burwell, Ontario, to carry freight cars, mostly of coal, much of it to be burned in CPR steam locomotives. Only one ferry boat was ever operated, Ashtabula, a large vessel which eventually sank in a harbour collision in Ashtabula on September 18, 1958, thus ending the service.

Canadian Pacific Car and Passenger Transfer Company was formed by other interest in 1888 linking the CPR in Prescott, Ontario, and the NYC in Ogdensburg, New York. Service on this route had actually begun very early, in 1854, along with service from Brockville. A bridge built in 1958 ended passenger service however, freight continued until Ogdensburg's dock was destroyed by fire September 25, 1970, thus ending all service. CPC&PTC was never owned by the CPR. Bay of Fundy ferry service was operated for passengers and freight for many years linking Digby, Nova Scotia, and Saint John, New Brunswick. Eventually, after 78 years, with the changing times the scheduled passenger services would all be ended as well as ocean cruises. Cargo would continue on both oceans with a change over to containers. CP was an intermodal pioneer especially on land with road and railway mixing to provide the best service. CP Ships was the final operation, and in the end it too left CP ownership when it was spun off in 2001. CP Ships was merged with Hapag-Lloyd in 2005.

==== British Columbia Coast Steamships ====
The Canadian Pacific Railway Coast Service (British Columbia Coast Steamships or BCCS) was established when the CPR acquired in 1901 Canadian Pacific Navigation Company (no relation) and its large fleet of ships that served 72 ports along the coast of British Columbia including on Vancouver Island. Service included the Vancouver-Victoria-Seattle Triangle Route, Gulf Islands, Powell River, as well as Vancouver-Alaska service. BCCS operated a fleet of 14 passenger ships made up of a number of Princess ships, pocket versions of the famous oceangoing Empress ships along with a freighter, three tugs and five railway car barges. Popular with tourists, the Princess ships were famous in their own right especially Princess Marguerite (II) which operated from 1949 until 1985 and was the last coastal liner in operation. The most notorious of the princess ships, however, is Princess Sophia, which sank with no survivors after striking the Vanderbilt Reef in Alaska's Lynn Canal, constituting the largest maritime disaster in the history of the Pacific Northwest. These services continued for many years until changing conditions in the late 1950s brought about their decline and eventual demise at the end of season in 1974. Princess Marguerite was acquired by the province's British Columbia Steamship (1975) Ltd. and continued to operate for a number of years. In 1977 although BCCSS was the legal name, it was rebranded as Coastal Marine Operations (CMO). By 1998 the company was bought by the Washington Marine Group which after purchase was renamed Seaspan Coastal Intermodal Company and then subsequently rebranded in 2011 as Seaspan Ferries Corporation. Passenger service ended in 1981.

==== British Columbia Lake and River Service ====
The Canadian Pacific Railway Lake and River Service (British Columbia Lake and River Service) developed slowly and in spurts of growth. CP began a long history of service in the Kootenays region of southern British Columbia beginning with the purchase in 1897 of the Columbia and Kootenay Steam Navigation Company which operated a fleet of steamers and barges on the Arrow Lakes and was merged into the CPR as the CPR Lake and River Service which also served the Arrow Lakes and Columbia River, Kootenay Lake and Kootenai River, Lake Okanagan and Skaha Lake, Slocan Lake, Trout Lake, and Shuswap Lake and the Thompson River/Kamloops Lake.

All of these lake operations had one thing in common, the need for shallow draft therefore sternwheelers were the choice of ship. Tugs and barges handled railway equipment including one operation that saw the entire train including the locomotive and caboose go along. These services gradually declined and ended in 1975 except for a freight barge on Slocan Lake. This was the one where the entire train went along since the barge was a link to an isolated section of track. The Iris G tug boat and a barge were operated under contract to CP Rail until the last train ran late in December 1988. The sternwheel steamship Moyie on Kootenay Lake was the last CPR passenger boat in BC lake service, having operated from 1898 until 1957. She became a beached historical exhibit, as are also the Sicamous and Naramata at Penticton on Lake Okanagan.

=== Canadian Pacific Hotels ===
To promote tourism and passenger ridership the Canadian Pacific established a series of first class hotels. These hotels became landmarks famous in their own right and are known collectively as Canada's "grand railway hotels". They include the Algonquin in St. Andrews, Château Frontenac in Quebec, Royal York in Toronto, Minaki Lodge in Minaki Ontario, Hotel Vancouver, Empress Hotel in Victoria and the Banff Springs Hotel and Chateau Lake Louise in the Canadian Rockies. Several signature hotels were acquired from its competitor Canadian National during the 1980s, including the Jasper Park Lodge. The hotels retain their Canadian Pacific heritage, but are no longer operated by the railway. In 1998, Canadian Pacific Hotels acquired Fairmont Hotels, an American company, becoming Fairmont Hotels and Resorts; the combined corporation operated the historic Canadian properties as well as the Fairmont's U.S. properties until merged with Raffles Hotels and Resorts and Swissôtel in 2006.

=== Canadian Pacific Air Lines ===
Canadian Pacific Airlines, also called CP Air, operated from 1942 to 1987 and was the main competitor of Canadian government-owned Air Canada. Based at Vancouver International Airport, it served Canadian and international routes until it was purchased by Pacific Western Airlines which merged PWA and CP Air to create Canadian Airlines.

== Locomotives ==
=== Steam locomotives ===
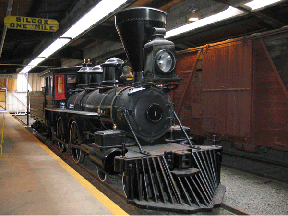
Countess of Dufferin

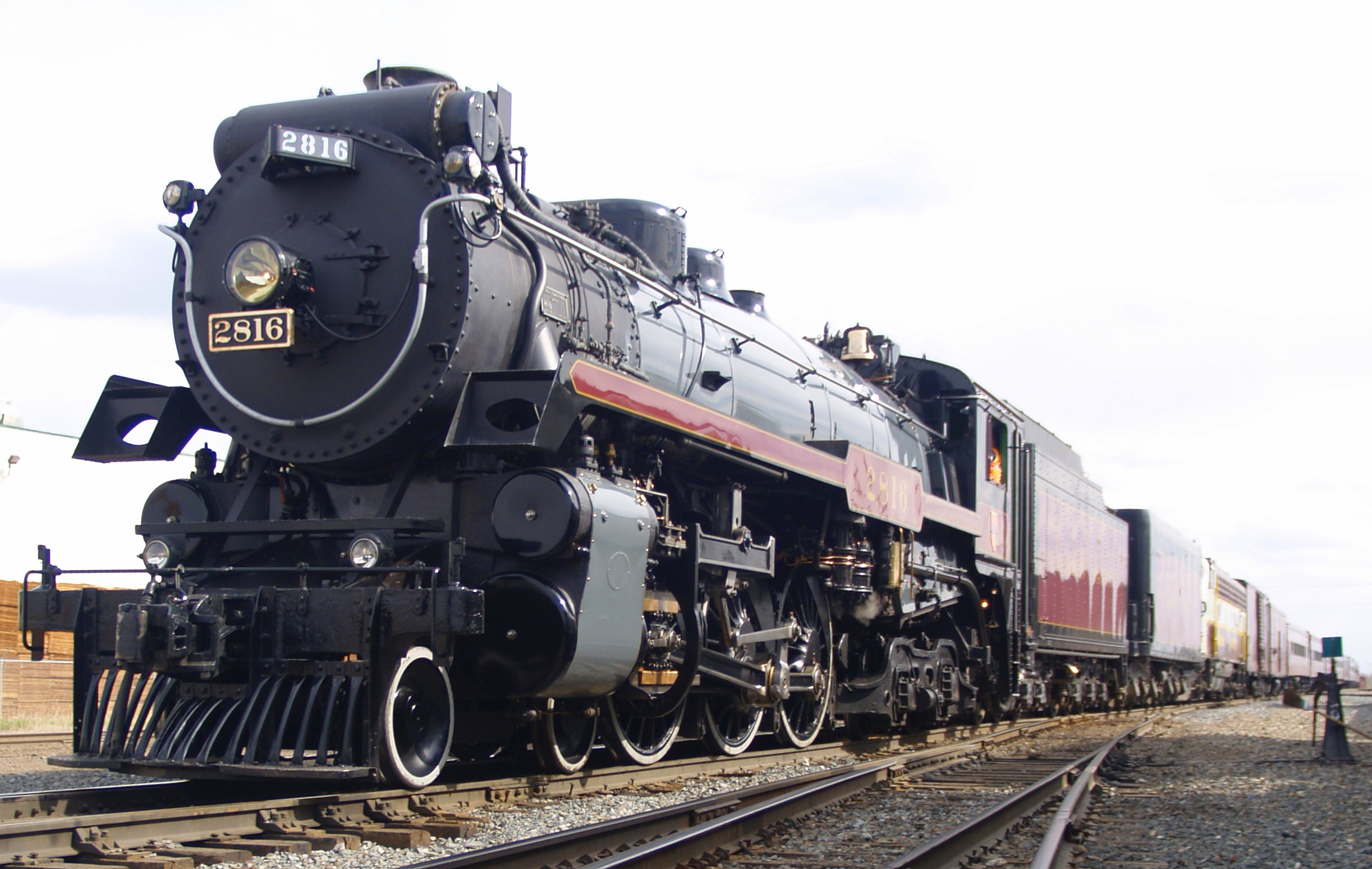
CPR No. 2816 locomotive

In the CPR's early years, it made extensive use of American-type 4-4-0 steam locomotives, and such examples of this are the Countess of Dufferin or No. 29. Later, considerable use was also made of the 4-6-0 type for passenger and 2-8-0 type for freight. Starting in the 20th century, the CPR bought and built hundreds of Ten-Wheeler-type 4-6-0s for passenger and freight service and similar quantities of 2-8-0s and 2-10-2s for freight. 2-10-2s were also used in passenger service on mountain routes. The CPR bought hundreds of 4-6-2 Pacifics between 1906 and 1948 with later versions being true dual-purpose passenger and fast-freight locomotives.

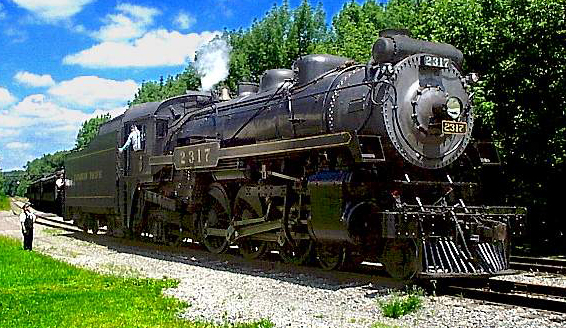
CPR 2317, a G-3-c 4-6-2 Pacific-type locomotive built at the CPR's Angus Shops in 1923

The CPR built hundreds of its own locomotives at its shops in Montreal, first at the "New Shops", as the DeLorimer shops were commonly referred to, and at the massive Angus Shops that replaced them in 1904. Some of the CPR's best-known locomotives were the 4-6-4 Hudsons. First built in 1929, they began a new era of modern locomotives with capabilities that changed how transcontinental passenger trains ran, eliminating frequent changes en route. The 2800s, as the Hudson type was known, ran from Toronto to Fort William, a distance of 1,305 kilometres (811 mi), while another lengthy engine district was from Winnipeg to Calgary 1,339 kilometres (832 mi). Especially notable were the semi-streamlined H1 class Royal Hudsons, locomotives that were given their name because one of their class hauled the royal train carrying King George VI and Queen Elizabeth on the 1939 royal tour across Canada without change or failure. That locomotive, No. 2850, is preserved in the Exporail exhibit hall of the Canadian Railway Museum in Saint-Constant, Quebec. One of the class, No. 2860, was restored by the British Columbia government and used in excursion service on the British Columbia Railway between 1974 and 1999.

The CPR also made many of their older 2-8-0s, built in the turn of the century, into 2-8-2s.

In 1929, the CPR received its first 2-10-4 Selkirk locomotives, the largest steam locomotives to run in Canada and the British Empire. Named after the Selkirk Mountains where they served, these locomotives were well suited for steep grades. They were regularly used in passenger and freight service. The CPR would own 37 of these locomotives, including number 8000, an experimental high pressure engine. The last steam locomotives that the CPR received, in 1949, were Selkirks, numbered 5930–5935.

=== Diesel locomotives ===
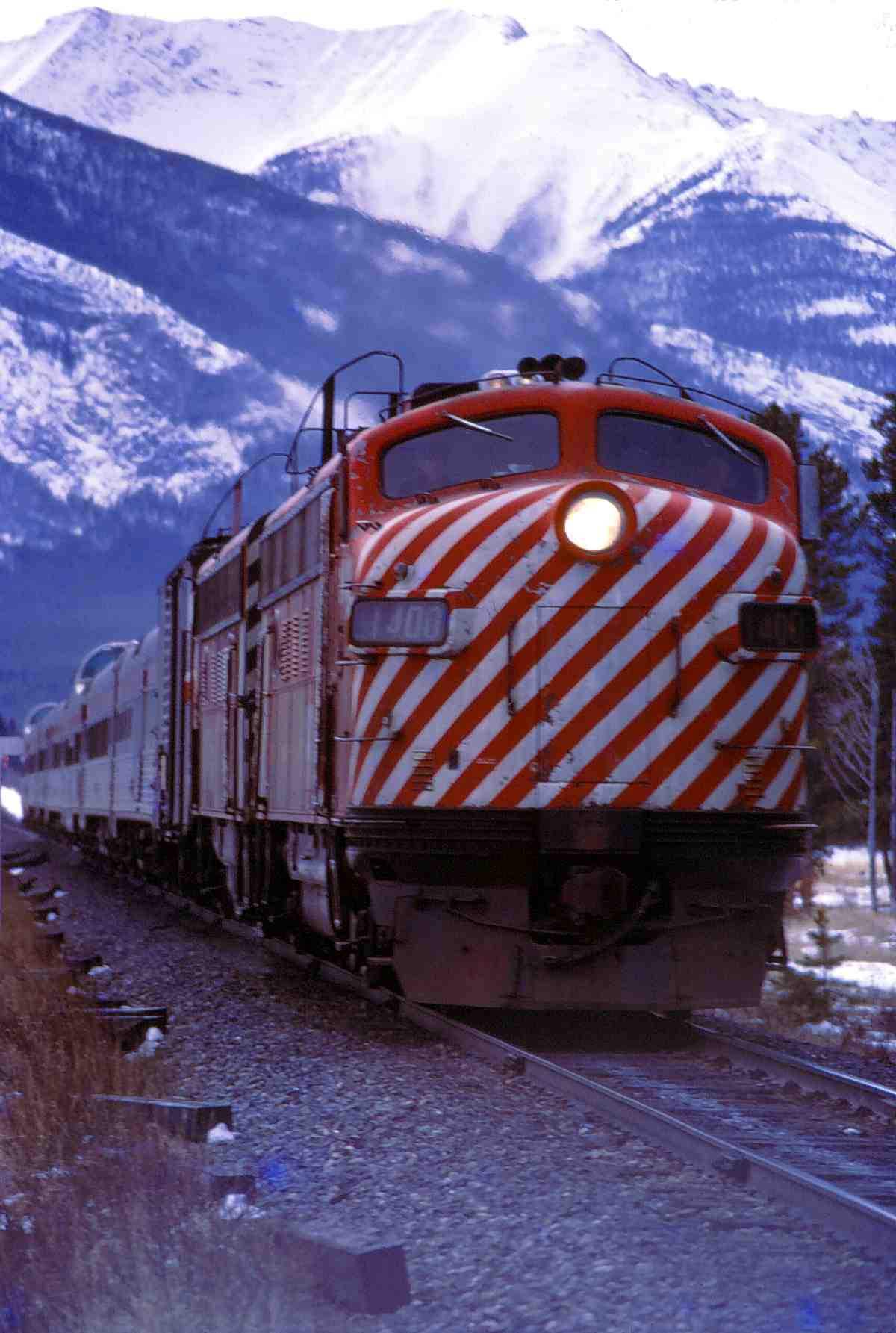
A CP passenger train heads east towards Calgary circa 1973

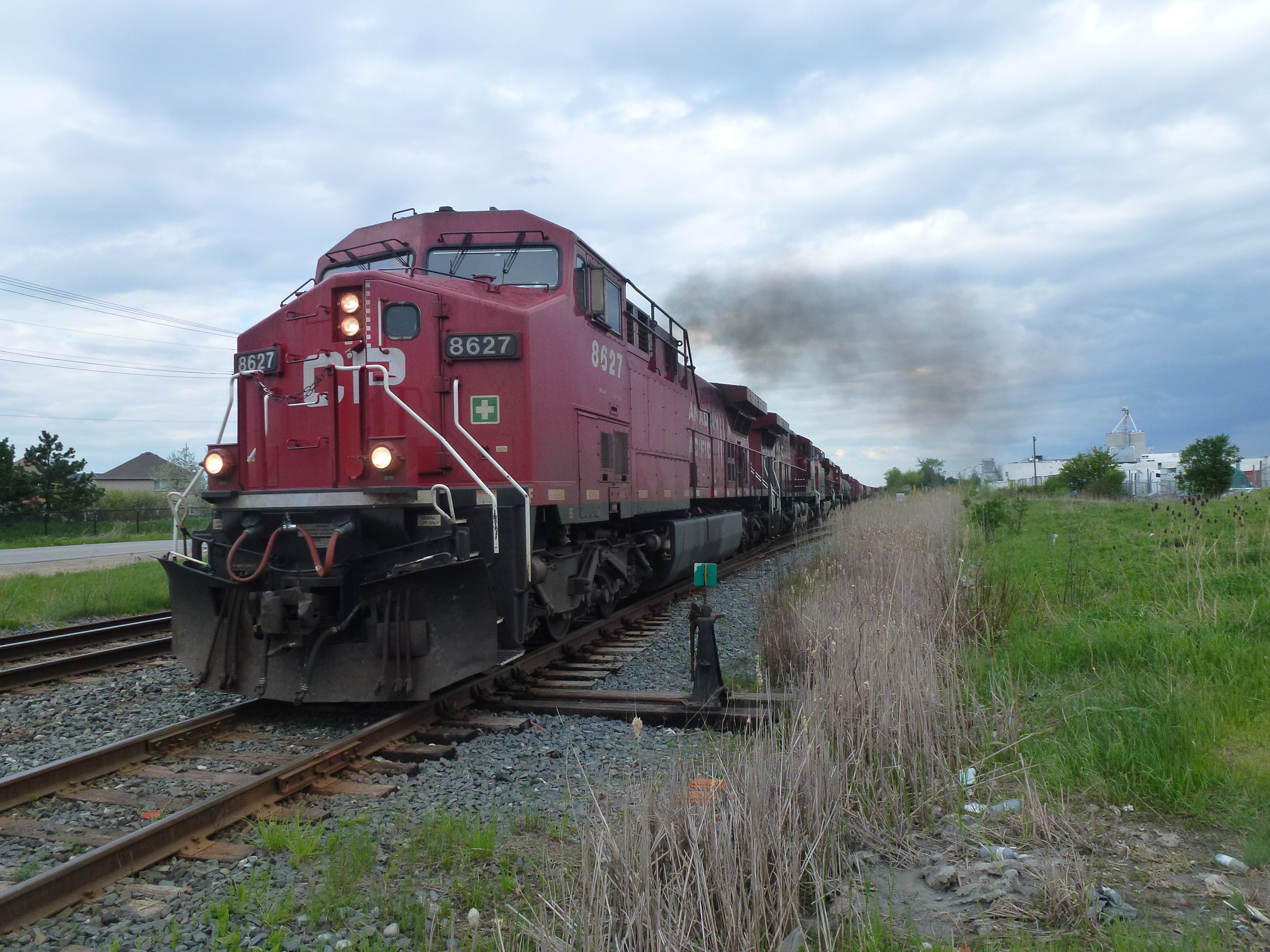
A westbound CP freight train pulls away from a passing siding after track clearance in Bolton, Ontario. It is headed by four GE AC4400CW locomotives (CP 8627, CP 9615, CP 8629, and CP 8609).

In 1937, the CPR acquired its first diesel-electric locomotive, a custom-built one-of-a-kind switcher numbered 7000. This locomotive was not successful and was not repeated. Production-model diesels were imported from American Locomotive Company (Alco) starting with five model S-2 yard switchers in 1943 and followed by further orders. In 1949, operations on lines in Vermont were dieselized with Alco FA1 road locomotives (eight A and four B units), five ALCO RS-2 road switchers, three Alco S-2 switchers and three EMD E8 passenger locomotives. In 1948 Montreal Locomotive Works began production of ALCO designs.

In 1949, the CPR acquired 13 Baldwin-designed locomotives from the Canadian Locomotive Company for its isolated Esquimalt and Nanaimo Railway and Vancouver Island was quickly dieselized. Following that successful experiment, the CPR started to dieselize its main network. Dieselization was completed 11 years later, with its last steam locomotive running on 6 November 1960. The CPR's first-generation locomotives were mostly made by General Motors Diesel and Montreal Locomotive Works (American Locomotive Company designs), with some made by the Canadian Locomotive Company to Baldwin and Fairbanks Morse designs.

CP was the first railway in North America to pioneer alternating current (AC) traction diesel-electric locomotives in 1984. In 1995, CP turned to GE Transportation for the first production AC traction locomotives in Canada, and now has the highest percentage of AC locomotives in service of all North American Class I railways.

On September 16, 2019, Progress Rail rolled out two SD70ACU rebuilds in Canadian Pacific heritage paint schemes; 7010 wears a Tuscan red and grey paint scheme with script writing, and the 7015 wears a similar paint scheme with block lettering.

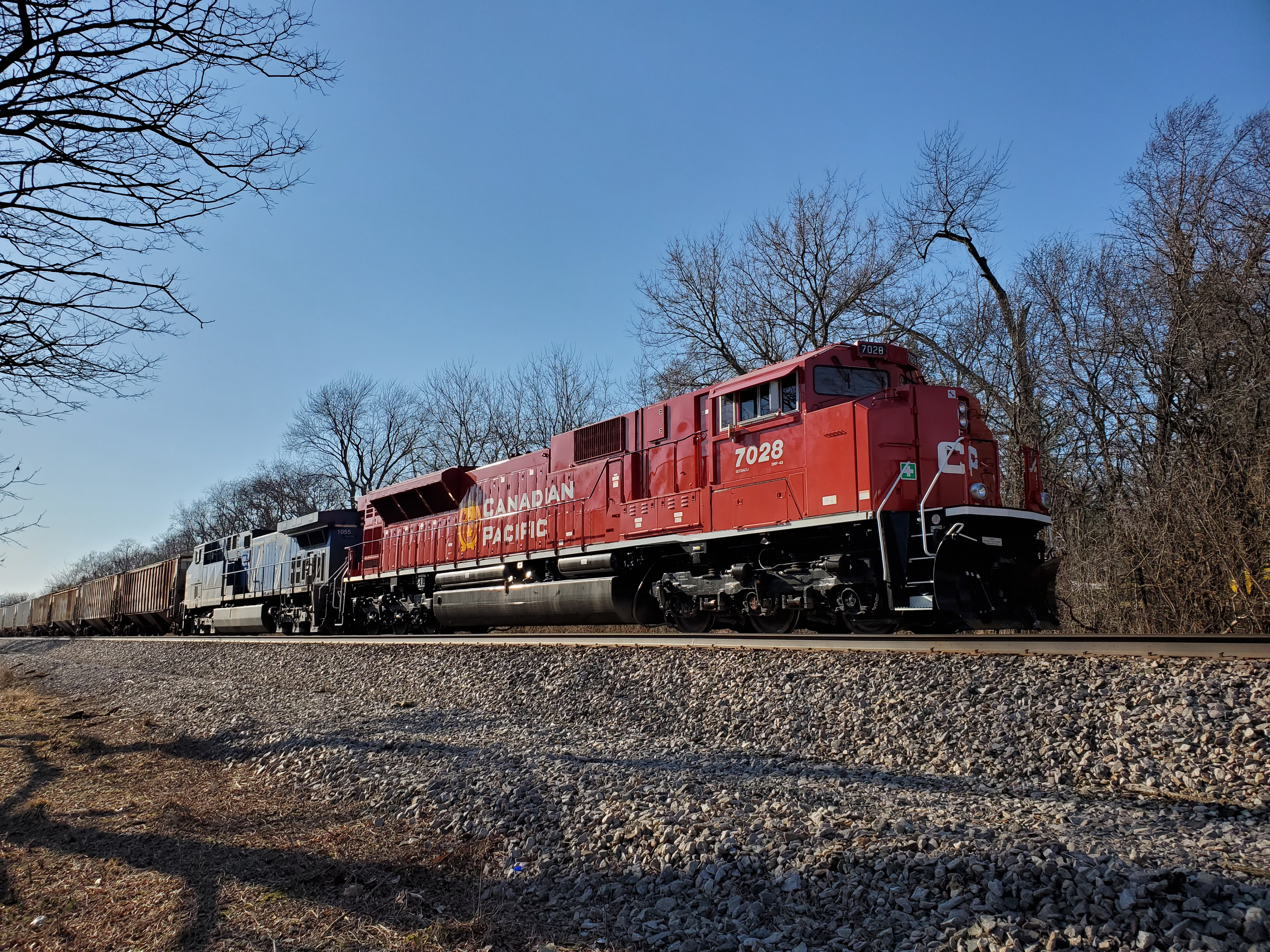
CP 7028, an EMD SD70ACU, in Nashotah, Wisconsin

On November 11, 2019, five SD70ACU units with commemorative military themes were unveiled during CPR's Remembrance Day ceremony. These units are numbered 7020–7023, with 7024 being renumbered to 6644 to commemorate the date of D-Day: June 6, 1944.

In 2021, Canadian Pacific repainted two locomotives orange: ES44AC 8757 which was unveiled for National Day for Truth and Reconciliation in September 2021, and ES44AC 8781 to commemorate shipper Hapag-Lloyd.

The fleet includes these types:

==== Final diesel roster ====
Builder	Model	Horsepower	Build date	Quantity	Numbers	Notes
EMD	FP9A	1750	1958	1	1401	Acquired 1998, used on the Royal Canadian Pacific
EMD	F9B	1750	1958	1	1900	Acquired 1998, used on the RCP
EMD	GP20C-ECO	2000	2012–2014	130	2200–2329	
EMD/GMD	GP38AC	2000	1970–1971	21	3000–3020	
EMD/GMD	GP38-2	2000	1983–1986	115	3021–3135	
EMD	GP40-3	3000	1966–1968	2	4007–4008	Ex-MILW/SOO
EMD	FP9A	1750	1957	2	4106–4107	Acquired 2006, used on the RCP
EMD	GP38-2	2000	1974–1983	74	4400–4452, 4506–4515	Acquired 1990, ex-SOO, 4500 series are ex-MILW
EMD	GP39-2	2300	1978	1	4599	Ex-KCCX/SOO
EMD	SD30C-ECO	3000	2013–2015	50	5000–5049	
EMD	SD40-3	3000	1980–1984	10	5100–5109	Rebuilt 2017
EMD/GMD	SD40-2	3000	1972–1984	508	5565–5879, 5900–6092	
EMD	SD60	3800	1989	37	6221–6257	Acquired 1990, ex-SOO
EMD	SD60M	3800	1989	5	6258–6262	Acquired 1990, ex-SOO
EMD	SD60-3	3800	1989	10	6300–6309	Rebuilt 2017, ex-SOO
EMD	SD40-2	3000	1972–1984	23	6601–6623	Ex-SOO
EMD	SD40-2F	3000	1989	10	9004, 9010–9011, 9014, 9017, 9020-9024	Many sold to CMQ. After the purchase of CMQ in June 2020, the remaining SD40-2Fs returned to CP Property.
EMD	SD70ACU	4300	1998–1999	60	6644, 7000–7023, 7025-7059	Rebuilt 2019–2020 from SD90MACs, 7010–7019 in heritage paint schemes. 6644, 7020–7023 in five distinct commemorative military paint schemes.
EMD	GP38-2	2000	1972	10	7303–7312	Acquired 1991, ex-DH
GE	AC4400CWM	4400	1995–1998	262	8000–8080, 8100–8199, 8200–8280	Rebuilt 2017–2021.
GE	AC4400CW	4400	2001–2004	173	8600–8655, 9700–9740, 9750–9784, 9800–9840	
GE	ES44AC	4400	2005–2012	291	8700–8960, 9350–9379	8757 painted into an Every Child Matters livery for National Day for Truth & Reconciliation

==== Retired diesel roster ====
Builder	Model	Horsepower	Build date	Retirement	Quantity	Numbers	Notes
GMD	FP7A	1750	1951–1953	1978	24	1400–1404, 1416–1434	Renumbered from 4099 to 4103
GMD	FP9A	1750	1954–1953	1978	11	1405–1415,	
EMD	E8A	2250	1949	1978	3	1800–1802	1800 and 1802 sold to Via Rail
GMD	F7B	1500	1951–1954	1978	51	1900, 1909–1919, 4424–4448, 4459–4462	Many sold to Via Rail
GMD	F9B	1750	1951–1954	1978	8	1901–1908	Many sold to Via Rail
Railpower	GG20B	2000	2005–2006	2006	6	1700–1707	Order cancelled before completion
Alco/MLW	FA-1	1500	1949–1950	1977	28	4000–4027	
MLW	FA-2	1500	1951–1953	1977	20	4042–4051, 4084–4093	
CLC	CPA16-4	1600	1951–1954	1975	11	4052–4057, 4064–4065, 4104–4105	
CLC	CFA16-4	1600	1953	1975	6	4076–4081	
MLW	FPA-2	1500	1953	1975	7	4082–4083, 4094–4098	
MLW	C424	2400	1963–1966	1998	51	4200–4250	4200 originally numbered 8300
MLW	M-630	3000	1968–1970	1995	37	4500–4515, 4550–4581	
MLW	M-636	3600	1969–1970	1995	44	4700–4743	
MLW	M-640	4000	1971	1998	1	4744	Rebuilt in 1984 as an AC Traction test unit
GMD	GP30	2250	1963	1998	2	5000–5001	Originally numbered 8200–8201
GMD	GP35	2500	1964–1966	1999	23	5002–5025	Some converted to control cabs
GMD	SD40	3000	1966–1967	2001	65	5500–5564	
MLW	S-3	1000	1951–1959	1984	101	6500–6600	
MLW	S-10	1000	1958	1983	13	6601–6613	
MLW	S-10	660	1959	1985	10	6614–6623	
GMD	SW8	800	1950–1951	1994	10	6700–6709	
GMD	SW900	900	1955	1994	11	6710–6720	6711 used as a track mobile
Alco/MLW	S-2	1000	1943–1947	1986	78	7010–7064, 7076–7098	
Baldwin	DS-4-4-1000	1000	1948	1979	11	7065–7075	
Baldwin	DRS-4-4-1000	1000	1948–1949	1979	13	8000–8012	
MLW	RS-23	1000	1959–1960	1997	35	8013–8046	
GMD	SW1200RS	1200	1958–1960	2012	72	8100–8171	Many rebuilt into SW1200RSUs in the 1980s
Alco/MLW	RS-2	1500	1949–1950	1983	9	8400–8408	
GMD	GP7	1500	1952	2013	17	8409–8425	Many rebuilt into GP7Us in the 1980s
MLW	RS-3	1600	1954	1983	36	8426–8461	
GMD	GP9	1750	1954–1959	2015	200	8483–8546, 8611–8708, 8801–8839	Many rebuilt into GP9Us in the 1980s
MLW	RS-10	1600	1956	1984	65	8462–8482, 8557–8600	
CLC	H-16-44	1600	1955–1957	1976	40	8547–8556, 8601–8610, 8709–8728	
MLW	RS-18	1800	1957–1958	1998	74	8729–8800, 8824	Many rebuilt into RS18Us in the 1980s
CLC/FM	H-24-66	2400	1955	1976	21	8900–8920	8905 Preserved at the Canadian Railway Museum
MLW	RSD-17	2400	1957	1995	1	8921	Preserved at Elgin County Railway Museum
GMD	SD40-2F	3000	1989	2016	25	9000–9003, 9005–9009, 9012–9013, 9015–9016, 9018–9019	Scrapped, the rest not numbered here went to Central Maine and Quebec Railway
Budd	RDC-3	550	1953–1956	1978	5	9020–9024	Many sold to Via Rail
Budd	RDC-1	550	1955–1958	1978	24	9049–9072	Many sold to Via Rail
GMD	SD90MAC	4300	1998–1999	2019	61	9100–9160	Rebuilt into SD70ACUs
Budd	RDC-2	550	1951–1956	1978	23	9100–9199	Many sold to Via Rail
Budd	RDC-4	550	1955–1956	1978	3	9200–9251	Sold to Via Rail
Budd	RDC-5	550	1955–1956	1982	8	9300–9309	Many sold to Via Rail
GMD	SD90MAC-H	6000	1998	2008	4	9300–9303	All have been scrapped

== Corporate structure ==
Canadian Pacific Railway Limited (TSX: CP NYSE: CP) is a Canadian railway transportation company that operates the Canadian Pacific Railway. It was created in 2001 when the CPR's former parent company, Canadian Pacific Limited, spun off its railway operations. On October 3, 2001, the company's shares began to trade on the New York Stock Exchange and the Toronto Stock Exchange under the "CP" symbol. During 2003, the company earned CA$3.5 billion in freight revenue. In October 2008, Canadian Pacific Railway Ltd was named one of "Canada's Top 100 Employers" by Mediacorp Canada Inc., and was featured in Maclean's. Later that month, CPR was named one of Alberta's Top Employers, which was reported in both the Calgary Herald and the Edmonton Journal.

=== Presidents ===
Term(s)	Name
1881–1888	Sir George Stephen United Kingdom/Canada
1889–1899	Sir William Cornelius Van Horne United States/Canada
1899–1918	The Lord Shaughnessy United States/Canada
1918–1942	Sir Edward Wentworth Beatty Canada
1942–1947	D'Alton Corry Coleman Canada
1947–1948	William Neal Canada
1948–1955	William Allen Mather Canada
1955–1964, 1966	Buck Crump Canada
1964–1966	Robert A. Emerson Canada
1966–1972	Ian David Sinclair Canada
1972–1981	Fred Burbidge Canada
1981–1984	William W. Stinson Canada
1984–1990	Russell S. Allison Canada
1990–2006	Robert J. Ritchie Canada
2006–2012	Fred Green Canada
2012	Stephen Tobias (Interim) United States
2012–2017	E. Hunter Harrison United States
2017 – 2023	Keith Creel United States

== Major facilities ==
Canadian Pacific owned a large number of large yards and repair shops across their system, which were used for many operations ranging from intermodal terminals to classification yards. Below are some examples of these.

=== Hump yards ===
Hump yards work by using a small hill over which cars are pushed, before being released down a slope and switched automatically into cuts of cars, ready to be made into outbound trains. Many of these yards were closed in 2012 and 2013 under Hunter Harrison's company-wide restructuring; only the St. Paul Yard hump remains open.

- Calgary, Alberta – 68-hectare (168-acre) Alyth Yard; handles 2,200 cars daily (closed)
- Franklin Park, Illinois – Bensenville Yard (closed)
- Montreal, Quebec – St. Luc Yard; active since 1950. Flat switching since the mid-1980s. (closed)
- St. Paul, Minnesota – Pig's Eye Yard / St. Paul Yard
- Toronto, Ontario – Toronto Yard (also known as "Toronto Freight Yard or Agincourt Yard") (closed)
- Winnipeg, Manitoba – Rugby Yard (also known as "Weston Yard") (closed)

== Aircraft ==
As of February 2023, Transport Canada lists the following aircraft in its database and operate as ICAO airline designator CRR, and telephony RAILCAR.

- 1 - Cessna Citation Sovereign (Cessna 680)
- 1 - Bombardier CL-600

== Joint partnership ==
- Toronto Terminals Railway – management team for Toronto's Union Station with Canadian National Railway.

== See also ==
- Canadian Pacific Railway Lake and River Service
- Canadian Pacific Hotels
- Canadian Pacific Radio
- Canadian Pacific Air Lines
- Canadian Pacific Air Lines Flight 21
- Canadian Pacific Air Lines Flight 402
- Canadian Pacific Building (London)
- Canadian Pacific Building (New York City)
- Canadian Pacific Building (Toronto)
- CPR Festivals
- History of Chinese immigration to Canada
