= List of Ontario railways =

The following railways operate in the Canadian province of Ontario.

== Common freight carriers ==
- Barrie Collingwood Railway (BCRY)
- Canadian National Railway (CN) including subsidiaries Algoma Central Railway (AC), Grand Trunk Western Railroad (GTW), and Sault Ste. Marie Bridge Company (SSAM), and lessor Arnprior–Nepean Railway
- Canadian Pacific Railway (CP)
- CSX Transportation (CSXT)
- Essex Terminal Railway (ETL)
- Goderich–Exeter Railway (GEXR)
- Huron Central Railway (HCRY)
- Minnesota, Dakota and Western Railway (MDW)
- Norfolk Southern Railway (NS)
- Ontario Northland Railway (ONT) including subsidiary Nipissing Central Railway
- Ontario Southland Railway (OS)
- Ottawa Valley Railway (RLK)
- Southern Ontario Railway (RLHH)
- Trillium Railway (TRRY) through subsidiaries Port Colborne Harbour Railway and St. Thomas and Eastern Railway

== Passenger carriers ==
- Amtrak (AMTK)
- Capital Railway
- Falls Incline Railway
- Port Stanley Terminal Rail
- South Simcoe Railway
- Via Rail (Via)
- Waterloo Central Railway
- Algoma Central Railway (CN)
- Polar Bear Express (ONTC)

== Light Rail Transit ==
- Ion rapid transit
- OC Transpo
- Toronto Transit Commission

== Defunct railways ==
| Name | Mark | System (Note: This is one or more of the major systems that the railroad became part of, if any.) | From | To | Successor | Notes |
|---|---|---|---|---|---|---|
| Algoma Central Railway | | | 1899 | 1901 | Algoma Central and Hudson Bay Railway | |
| Algoma Central and Hudson Bay Railway | AC | | 1901 | 1965 | Algoma Central Railway | |
| Algoma Eastern Railway | AER | CP | 1911 | 1958 | Canadian Pacific Railway | |
| Amherstburg, Lake Shore and Blenheim Railway | | C&O | 1889 | 1890 | Lake Erie and Detroit River Railway | |
| Bay of Quinte Railway | BQ | CNor | 1897 | 1954 | Canadian Northern Consolidated Railways | |
| Bay of Quinte Railway and Navigation Company | | CNor | 1881 | 1897 | Bay of Quinte Railway | |
| Belleville and North Hastings Railway | | GT | 1874 | 1881 | Grand Junction Railway | Purchased by the Grand Junction Railway shortly after completion, became a spur shortly after. |
| Bessemer and Barry's Bay Railway | | CNor | 1904 | 1985 | | Wholly owned branch of the Central Ontario Railway, ultimately part of CNoR and CN. |
| Brantford and Buffalo Joint Stock Railroad | | GT | 1851 | 1852 | Buffalo, Brantford and Goderich Railway | |
| Brantford and Harrisburg Railway | | GWR | 1871 | | | A short line connecting Brantford with the Great Western junction at Harrisburg. Folded into the Great Western system, then inherited by the Grand Trunk. The line has been abandoned. |
| Brantford, Norfolk and Port Burwell Railway | | GT | 1874 | 1893 | Grand Trunk Railway | |
| Brantford, Waterloo and Lake Erie Railway | | CP/ NYC | 1885 | 1892 | Toronto, Hamilton and Buffalo Railway | |
| Brockville and Ottawa Railway | | CP | 1853 | 1878 | Canada Central Railway | |
| Brockville and Westport Railway | | CNor | 1871 | 1884 | Brockville, Westport and Sault Ste. Marie Railway | |
| Brockville, Westport and North-Western Railway | | CNor | 1903 | 1914 | Canadian Northern Railway | |
| Brockville, Westport and Sault Ste. Marie Railway | | CNor | 1884 | 1903 | Brockville, Westport and North-Western Railway | |
| Bruce Mines and Algoma Railway | | | 1899 | 1913 | Lake Huron and Northern Ontario Railway | |
| Buffalo, Brantford and Goderich Railway | | GT | 1852 | 1856 | Buffalo and Lake Huron Railway | |
| Buffalo and Lake Huron Railway | | GT | 1856 | 1958 | Canadian National Railway | |
| Bytown and Prescott Railway | | CP | 1850 | 1855 | Ottawa and Prescott Railway | |
| Campbellford, Lake Ontario and Western Railway | | CP | 1904 | 1956 | Canadian Pacific Railway | |
| Canada Atlantic Railway | | GT | 1879 | 1914 | Grand Trunk Railway | Part of J.R. Booth's railway network, also including the Ottawa, Arnprior and Parry Sound Railway. Was, for a time, the busiest railway in Canada, carrying 40% of the grain trade. |
| Canada Central Railway | | CP | 1861 | 1881 | Canadian Pacific Railway | |
| Canada and Michigan Bridge and Tunnel Company | | NYC | 1895 | 1905 | Detroit River Tunnel Company | |
| Canada and Michigan Tunnel Company | | NYC | 1888 | 1895 | Canada and Michigan Bridge and Tunnel Company | |
| Canada Southern Railway | CASO | NYC | 1869 | | | Still exists as a subsidiary of CNCP Niagara–Windsor Partnership, a nonoperating joint subsidiary of the Canadian National Railway and Canadian Pacific Railway |
| Canadian Government Railways | CGR | CGR | 1915 | 1993 | Canadian National Railway | |
| Canadian Northern Railway | CN | CNor | 1900 | 1956 | Canadian National Railway | |
| Canadian Northern Consolidated Railways | | CNor | 1954 | 1956 | Canadian National Railway | |
| Canadian Northern Ontario Railway | CNO | CNor | 1906 | 1956 | Canadian National Railway | |
| Canadian Northern Quebec Railway | CNQ | CNor | 1906 | | | Still exists as a subsidiary of the Canadian National Railway |
| Central Counties Railway | | GT | 1889 | | | |
| Central Ontario Railway | COR | CNor | 1882 | 1954 | Canadian Northern Consolidated Railways | Mainline runs from Picton to Trenton, then turns north through Hastings County to Bancroft and beyond. |
| Chesapeake and Ohio Railway | C&O, CO | C&O | 1947 | 1987 | CSX Transportation | |
| Cleveland, Port Stanley and London Transportation and Railway Company | | | 1893 | 1894 | Lake Erie and Detroit River Railway | |
| Cobourg, Blairton and Marmora Railway and Mining Company | | GT | 1887 | 1893 | Grand Trunk Railway | |
| Cobourg and Peterborough Railway | | GT | 1852 | 1866 | Cobourg, Peterborough and Marmora Railway and Mining Company | |
| Cobourg, Peterborough and Marmora Railway and Mining Company | | GT | 1866 | 1887 | Cobourg, Blairton and Marmora Railway and Mining Company, Peterborough and Chemong Lake Railway | |
| Consolidated Rail Corporation | CR | | 1976 | 1999 | CSX Transportation, Norfolk Southern Railway | |
| Credit Valley Railway | | CP | 1871 | | | |
| Detroit River Tunnel Company | | NYC | 1905 | | | Still exists as a nonoperating subsidiary of the Canadian Pacific Railway |
| Dresden and Oil Springs Railway | | NYC | 1873 | 1876 | Sarnia, Chatham and Erie Railway | |
| Erie and Huron Railway | | C&O | 1873 | 1899 | Lake Erie and Detroit River Railway | |
| Erie and Niagara Railway | | NYC | 1863 | 1893 | Canada Southern Railway | |
| Erie and Niagara Extension Railway | | NYC | 1868 | 1869 | Canada Southern Railway | |
| Erie and Ontario Railway | | CP/ NYC | 1914 | 1915 | Toronto, Hamilton and Buffalo Railway | |
| Erie and Ontario Railway | | NYC | 1835 | 1863 | Erie and Niagara Railway | |
| Fenelon Falls Railway | | GT | 1871 | 1872 | Lindsay, Fenelon Falls and Ottawa River Railway | |
| Fort Erie Railway | | NYC | 1857 | 1863 | Erie and Niagara Railway | |
| Fort William Terminal Railway and Bridge Company | | CP | 1906 | 1956 | Canadian Pacific Railway | |
| Galt and Guelph Railway | | GT | 1852 | 1893 | Grand Trunk Railway | |
| Gananoque, Perth and James Bay Railway | | GT | 1884 | 1888 | Thousand Islands Railway | |
| Gananoque and Rideau Railway | | GT | 1871 | 1884 | Thousand Islands Railway | |
| Georgian Bay and Seaboard Railway | | CP | 1905 | 1956 | Canadian Pacific Railway | Wholly owned CPR subsidiary built to avoid shipping grain through the Toronto area, used only briefly until being broken into parts. |
| Georgian Bay and Wellington Railway | | GT | 1878 | 1881 | Grand Trunk, Georgian Bay and Lake Erie Railway | |
| Grand Junction Railway | | GT | 1852 | 1882 | Midland Railway of Canada | |
| Grand River Railway | GRNR | CP | 1914 | | | Electric until 1961; still exists as a subsidiary of the Canadian Pacific Railway |
| Grand Trunk Railway | GT | GT | 1852 | 1923 | Canadian National Railway | |
| Grand Trunk, Georgian Bay and Lake Erie Railway | | GT | 1881 | 1893 | Grand Trunk Railway | |
| Grand Trunk Pacific Railway | GTP | | 1903 | 1956 | Canadian National Railway | |
| Great Northern Railway of Canada | | CNor | 1892 | 1906 | Canadian Northern Quebec Railway | |
| Great Western Railway | | GT | 1845 | 1882 | Grand Trunk Railway | |
| Guelph and Goderich Railway | | CP | 1904 | 1956 | Canadian Pacific Railway | |
| Guelph Junction Railway | | CP | 1884 | | | Still exists as a lessor of the Ontario Southland Railway |
| Hamilton and Lake Erie Railway | | GT | 1869 | 1876 | Hamilton and North-Western Railway | |
| Hamilton and North-Western Railway | | GT | 1872 | 1888 | Grand Trunk Railway | |
| Hamilton and Port Dover Railway | | GT | 1853 | 1873 | Hamilton and Lake Erie Railway | |
| Hamilton and Toronto Railway | | GT | 1852 | 1855 | Great Western Railway | |
| Huntsville and Lake of Bays Railway | | | 1900 | 1960 | N/A | |
| Huron and Quebec Railway | | GT | 1874 | 1877 | Toronto and Ottawa Railway | |
| International Bridge Company | | GT | 1857 | 1956 | Canadian National Railway | |
| International Bridge and Terminal Company | IBT | | 1905 | | | Still exists as a nonoperating subsidiary of the Minnesota, Dakota and Western Railway |
| Interprovincial and James Bay Railway | | CP | 1901 | 1956 | Canadian Pacific Railway | |
| Irondale, Bancroft and Ottawa Railway | | CNor | 1884 | 1943 | Canadian National Railway | |
| James Bay Railway | | CNor | 1895 | 1906 | Canadian Northern Ontario Railway | |
| Kingston, Napanee and Western Railway | | CNor | 1890 | 1897 | Bay of Quinte Railway | |
| Kingston and Pembroke Railway | | CP | 1871 | | | Still exists as a nonoperating subsidiary of the Canadian Pacific Railway |
| Lake Erie and Detroit River Railway | | C&O | 1890 | | | Still exists as a subsidiary of CSX Transportation |
| Lake Erie, Essex and Detroit River Railway | | C&O | 1885 | 1891 | Lake Erie and Detroit River Railway | |
| Lake Erie and Northern Railway | LEN | CP | 1911 | | | Electric until 1961; still exists as a nonoperating subsidiary of the Canadian Pacific Railway |
| Lake Huron and Northern Ontario Railway | | | 1913 | 1921 | N/A | |
| Lake Simcoe Junction Railway | | GT | 1873 | 1893 | Grand Trunk Railway | |
| Lake Temiscamingue Colonization Railway | | CP | 1886 | | | |
| Leamington, Comber and Lake St. Clair Railway | | NYC | 1877 | 1879 | Leamington and St. Clair Railway | |
| Leamington and St. Clair Railway | | NYC | 1879 | 1904 | Canada Southern Railway | |
| Lindsay, Bobcaygeon and Pontypool Railway | | CP | 1890 | 1958 | Canadian Pacific Railway | |
| Lindsay, Fenelon Falls and Ottawa River Railway | | GT | 1872 | 1873 | Victoria Railway | |
| London and Gore Railroad | | GT | 1834 | 1845 | Great Western Railway | |
| London, Huron and Bruce Railway | | GT | 1871 | 1893 | Grand Trunk Railway | |
| London and Port Stanley Railway | LPS | | 1853 | 1965 | Canadian National Railway | Electric from 1915 to 1957 |
| Manitoulin and North Shore Railway | | CP | 1888 | 1911 | Algoma Eastern Railway | |
| Marmora Railway and Mining Company | | CNor | 1900 | | | Wholly owned branch of the Central Ontario Railway, ultimately part of CNoR and CN. |
| Michigan Central Railroad | | NYC | 1883 | 1930 | New York Central Railroad | |
| Midland Railway of Canada | | GT | 1869 | 1893 | Grand Trunk Railway | |
| Midland Simcoe Railway | | CP | 1912 | 1956 | Canadian Pacific Railway | |
| Midland Terminal Railway | | CP | 1903 | 1912 | Midland Simcoe Railway | |
| Montreal and City of Ottawa Junction Railway | | GT | 1871 | 1879 | Canada Atlantic Railway | |
| Montreal and Ottawa Railway | | CP | 1890 | 1958 | Canadian Pacific Railway | |
| Napanee, Tamworth and Quebec Railway | | CNor | 1879 | 1890 | Kingston, Napanee and Western Railway | |
| National Transcontinental Railway | | CGR | 1903 | 1993 | Canadian National Railway | |
| New York Central Railroad | NYC | NYC | 1916 | 1968 | Penn Central Transportation Company | |
| Niagara Falls Suspension Bridge Company | | GT | 1846 | | | |
| Niagara Peninsula Bridge Company | | NYC | 1882 | 1883 | Niagara River Bridge Company | |
| Niagara River Bridge Company | | NYC | 1883 | 2002 | N/A | Still exists as an abandoned subsidiary of CNCP Niagara–Windsor Partnership, a nonoperating joint subsidiary of the Canadian National Railway and Canadian Pacific Railway |
| Niagara, St. Catharines and Toronto Railway | NS&T | CNor | 1899 | 1958 | Canadian National Railway | Electric until 1960 |
| Norfolk Railway | | GT | 1869 | 1874 | Brantford, Norfolk and Port Burwell Railway | |
| Norfolk and Western Railway | N&W, NW | | 1964 | 1998 | Norfolk Southern Railway | |
| North Grey Railway | | GT | 1871 | 1871 | Northern Extension Railways | |
| North Simcoe Railway | | GT | 1874 | 1893 | Grand Trunk Railway | |
| Northern Railway of Canada | | GT | 1858 | 1888 | Grand Trunk Railway | |
| Northern Extension Railways | | GT | 1871 | 1875 | Northern Railway of Canada | |
| Northern, North-Western and Sault Ste. Marie Railway | | GT | 1881 | 1883 | Northern and Pacific Junction Railway | |
| Northern and Pacific Junction Railway | | GT | 1883 | 1892 | Grand Trunk Railway | |
| Nosbonsing and Nipissing Railway | | | 1886 | | N/A | |
| Ontario, Belmont and Northern Railway | | CNor | 1891 | 1900 | Marmora Railway and Mining Company | Wholly owned branch of the Central Ontario Railway, renamed shortly after construction. |
| Ontario L'Orignal Railway | OLO | | 1996 | 2000 | Ottawa Central Railway | |
| Ontario and Ottawa Railway | | CNor | 1910 | 1914 | Canadian Northern Railway | |
| Ontario Pacific Railway | | NYC | 1882 | 1897 | Ottawa and New York Railway | |
| Ontario and Quebec Railway | | CP | 1871 | 1998 | St. Lawrence and Hudson Railway | |
| Ontario and Rainy River Railway | | CNor | 1886 | 1900 | Canadian Northern Railway | |
| Ontario, Simcoe and Huron Railway | | GT | 1851 | 1858 | Northern Railway of Canada | |
| Oshawa Railway | | GT | 1891 | 1958 | Canadian National Railway | Electric until 1964 |
| Oshawa Railway and Navigation Company | | GT | 1887 | 1891 | Oshawa Railway | |
| Ottawa, Arnprior and Parry Sound Railway | | GT | 1891 | 1899 | Canada Atlantic Railway | The western half of J.R. Booth's Canada Atlantic Railway, formerly merged into the CAR in 1899. |
| Ottawa, Arnprior and Renfrew Railway | | GT | 1888 | 1891 | Ottawa, Arnprior and Parry Sound Railway | |
| Ottawa and Gatineau Railway | | CP | 1894 | 1901 | Ottawa, Northern and Western Railway | |
| Ottawa and Gatineau Valley Railway | | CP | 1887 | 1894 | Ottawa and Gatineau Railway | |
| Ottawa Interprovincial Bridge Company | | CP | 1898 | | | |
| Ottawa and New York Railway | | NYC | 1897 | 1957 | N/A | |
| Ottawa, Northern and Western Railway | | CP | 1901 | 1958 | Canadian Pacific Railway | |
| Ottawa and Parry Sound Railway | | GT | 1888 | 1891 | Ottawa, Arnprior and Parry Sound Railway | |
| Ottawa and Prescott Railway | | CP | 1855 | 1867 | St. Lawrence and Ottawa Railway | |
| Ottawa Terminals Railway | | GT | 1907 | | | |
| Parry Sound Colonization Railway | | GT | 1885 | 1896 | Ottawa, Arnprior and Parry Sound Railway | |
| Pembroke Southern Railway | | GT | 1893 | 1956 | Canadian National Railway | |
| Penn Central Transportation Company | PC | | 1968 | 1976 | Consolidated Rail Corporation | |
| Pere Marquette Railroad | | C&O | 1904 | 1917 | Pere Marquette Railway | |
| Pere Marquette Railway | PM | C&O | 1917 | 1947 | Chesapeake and Ohio Railway | |
| Peterborough and Chemong Lake Railway | | GT | 1888 | 1893 | Grand Trunk Railway | Wholly owned subsidiary of the Cobourg and Peterborough, became separate when the rest of the line was sold to the Marmora interests. |
| Peterborough and Chemong Lake Railway | | GT | 1855 | 1868 | Cobourg, Peterborough and Marmora Railway and Mining Company | |
| Peterborough and Port Hope Railway | | GT | 1846 | 1854 | Port Hope, Lindsay and Beaverton Railway | |
| Pontiac Pacific Junction Railway | | CP | 1880 | 1903 | Ottawa, Northern and Western Railway | |
| Port Arthur, Duluth and Western Railway | | CNor | 1887 | 1900 | Canadian Northern Railway | |
| Port Dalhousie and Thorold Railway | | GT | 1853 | 1857 | Welland Railway | |
| Port Dover and Lake Huron Railway | | GT | 1872 | 1881 | Grand Trunk, Georgian Bay and Lake Erie Railway | |
| Port Hope, Lindsay and Beaverton Railway | | GT | 1854 | 1869 | Midland Railway of Canada | |
| Port Whitby and Port Perry Railway | | GT | 1868 | 1874 | Whitby and Port Perry Extension Railway | |
| Prescott County Railway | | GT | 1887 | 1889 | Central Counties Railway | |
| Prince Edward County Railway | | CNor | 1873 | 1882 | Central Ontario Railway | |
| St. Clair Frontier Tunnel Company | | GT | 1884 | 1886 | St. Clair Tunnel Company | |
| St. Clair Tunnel Company | | GT | 1886 | 2008 | Grand Trunk Western Railroad | |
| St. Lawrence and Hudson Railway | STLH | CP | 1996 | 2001 | Canadian Pacific Railway | |
| St. Lawrence and Ottawa Railway | | CP | 1867 | | | Still exists as a nonoperating subsidiary of the Canadian Pacific Railway |
| St. Mary's and Western Ontario Railway | | CP | 1905 | 1958 | Canadian Pacific Railway | |
| Sarnia, Chatham and Erie Railway | | NYC | 1876 | 1904 | Canada Southern Railway | |
| South Norfolk Railway | | GT | 1887 | 1889 | Grand Trunk, Georgian Bay and Lake Erie Railway | |
| South Ontario Pacific Railway | | CP | 1887 | 1956 | Canadian Pacific Railway | |
| Stratford and Huron Railway | | GT | 1855 | 1881 | Grand Trunk, Georgian Bay and Lake Erie Railway | |
| Superior and Western Ontario Railway | | | 1909 | | N/A | |
| Temiskaming and Northern Ontario Railway | TEM | | 1902 | 1946 | Ontario Northland Railway | |
| Thousand Islands Railway | | GT | 1884 | 1958 | Canadian National Railway | |
| Thunder Bay Colonization Railway | | CNor | 1883 | 1887 | Port Arthur, Duluth and Western Railway | |
| Tilsonburg, Lake Erie and Pacific Railway | | CP | 1890 | 1958 | Canadian Pacific Railway | |
| Toronto Belt Line Railway | | GT | 1889 | 1943 | Canadian National Railway | |
| Toronto, Grey and Bruce Railway | | CP | 1868 | 1998 | St. Lawrence and Hudson Railway | |
| Toronto and Guelph Railway | | GT | 1851 | 1853 | Grand Trunk Railway | |
| Toronto, Hamilton and Buffalo Railway | TH&B, THB | CP/ NYC | 1884 | | | Still exists as a nonoperating subsidiary of the Canadian Pacific Railway |
| Toronto and Nipissing Railway | | GT | 1868 | 1882 | Midland Railway of Canada | |
| Toronto and Nipissing Eastern Extension Railway | | CNor | 1880 | 1884 | Irondale, Bancroft and Ottawa Railway | |
| Toronto and Ottawa Railway | | GT | 1877 | 1882 | Midland Railway of Canada | |
| Toronto, Simcoe and Lake Huron Railway | | GT | 1849 | 1851 | Ontario, Simcoe and Huron Railway | |
| Toronto, Simcoe and Muskoka Junction Railway | | GT | 1869 | 1871 | Northern Extension Railways | |
| Toronto Terminals Railway | | CP/ GT | 1906 | | | Still exists as a joint subsidiary of the Canadian National Railway and Canadian Pacific Railway |
| Trans-Ontario Railway | TOR | | 1996 | 1997 | Ottawa Valley Railway | |
| Vaudreuil and Prescott Railway | | CP | 1884 | 1890 | Montreal and Ottawa Railway | |
| Victoria Railway | | GT | 1873 | 1882 | Midland Railway of Canada | |
| Wabash Railroad | | WAB | 1898 | 1915 | Wabash Railway | |
| Wabash Railroad | WAB | WAB | 1942 | 1964 | Norfolk and Western Railway | |
| Wabash Railway | | WAB | 1915 | 1942 | Wabash Railroad | |
| Walkerton and Lucknow Railway | | CP | 1904 | 1956 | Canadian Pacific Railway | |
| Waterloo Junction Railway | | GT | 1889 | 1893 | Grand Trunk Railway | |
| Welland Railway | | GT | 1857 | 1884 | Grand Trunk Railway | Line leased to Great Western in 1878 and GT in 1882 and sold 1884. |
| Wellington, Grey and Bruce Railway | | GT | 1864 | 1893 | Grand Trunk Railway | |
| West Ontario Pacific Railway | | CP | 1885 | | | Still exists as a nonoperating subsidiary of the Canadian Pacific Railway |
| Whitby and Port Perry Extension Railway | | GT | 1874 | 1877 | Whitby, Port Perry and Lindsay Railway | |
| Whitby, Port Perry and Lindsay Railway | | GT | 1877 | 1882 | Midland Railway of Canada | |
| York Durham Heritage Railway | | CN | 1996 | 2023 | Toronto and Nipissing Railway | Closed December 2023 and bankrupt March 2024 |

=== Electric ===
- Belleville Traction Company
- Berlin and Bridgeport Electric Street Railway
- Berlin and Northern Railway
- Berlin and Waterloo Street Railway
- Brantford and Hamilton Electric Railway
- Brantford Street Railway
- Buffalo Railway
- Canadian National Electric Railways
- Chatham, Wallaceburg and Lake Erie Railway
- City Railway of Windsor
- City and Suburban Electric Railway
- Cornwall Electric Street Railway
- Cornwall Street Railway, Light and Power Company
- Davenport Street Railway
- Fort William Electric Railway
- Galt and Preston Street Railway
- Galt, Preston and Hespeler Street Railway
- Grand River Railway (GRNR)
- Grand Valley Railway
- Guelph Railway
- Guelph Radial Railway
- Hamilton Cataract Power, Light and Traction Company
- Hamilton and Dundas Street Railway
- Hamilton Electric Light and Cataract Power Company
- Hamilton, Grimsby and Beamsville Electric Railway
- Hamilton Radial Electric Railway
- Hamilton Street Railway
- Hamilton, Waterloo and Guelph Railway
- Huron, Bruce and Grey Electric Railway
- Huron and Ontario Electric Railway (c. 1906 planned and never built)
- Hydro-Electric Railways
- International Railway
- International Transit Company
- Kingston, Portsmouth and Cataraqui Electric Railway
- Kingston Street Railway
- Kitchener and Waterloo Street Railway
- Lake Erie and Northern Railway (LEN)
- Leander Colt Incline
- London and Lake Erie Railway and Transportation Company
- London and Port Stanley Railway (LPS)
- London Street Railway
- Maid of the Mist Incline
- Metropolitan Street Railway
- Metropolitan Street Railway of Toronto
- Middlesex and Elgin Inter-urban Railway
- Mount McKay and Kakabeka Falls Railway
- Niagara Falls, Park and River Railway
- Niagara Falls, Wesley Park and Clifton Tramway Company
- Niagara, St. Catharines and Toronto Railway (NS&T)
- Niagara, Welland and Lake Erie Railway
- Nipissing Central Railway
- North Yonge Railways
- Ontario Southern Railway
- Ontario Traction Company
- Ontario West Shore Railway
- Ontario West Shore Electric Railway
- Oshawa Railway
- Ottawa City Passenger Railway
- Ottawa Electric Railway
- Ottawa Electric Street Railway
- Peterboro and Ashburnham Street Railway
- Peterboro Radial Railway
- Port Arthur Civic Company
- Port Arthur Electric Street Railway
- Port Arthur and Fort William Electric Railway
- Port Dalhousie, St. Catharines and Thorold Electric Street Railway
- Port Dover, Brantford, Berlin and Goderich Railway
- Preston and Berlin Railway
- St. Catharines, Merritton and Thorold Railway
- St. Catharines and Niagara Central Railway
- St. Catharines Street Railway
- St. Thomas Street Railway
- Sandwich, Windsor and Amherstburg Railway
- Sandwich and Windsor Passenger Railway
- Sarnia Street Railway
- Schomberg and Aurora Railway
- South Essex Electric Railway
- Southwestern Traction Company
- Sudbury and Copper Cliff Suburban Electric Railway
- Toronto Railway
- Toronto and Mimico Railway
- Toronto and Mimico Electric Railway and Light Company
- Toronto and Scarboro' Electric Railway, Light and Power Company
- Toronto Street Railway
- Toronto Suburban Railway
- Toronto Suburban Street Railway
- Toronto and York Radial Railway
- Weston, High Park and Toronto Street Railway
- Whirlpool Rapids Incline
- Windsor, Essex and Lake Shore Rapid Railway (WE&L)
- Windsor and Tecumseh Electric Railway
- Woodstock, Thames Valley and Ingersoll Electric Railway

=== Private freight carriers ===
- Rama Timber Transport Company
- Nosbonsing and Nipissing Railway
- Whitney and Opeongo Railway
- Egan Estates Railway
- Orangeville Brampton Railway

=== Passenger carriers ===
- Waterloo – St. Jacobs Railway

=== Never completed ===
- Ontario and Pacific Junction Railway
- Toronto Eastern Railway

== See also ==
- Rail transport in Ontario
- History of rail transport in Canada
- List of defunct Canadian railways
