= James Ross (Canadian businessman) =

Scottish-born Canadian civil engineer, businessman and philanthropist

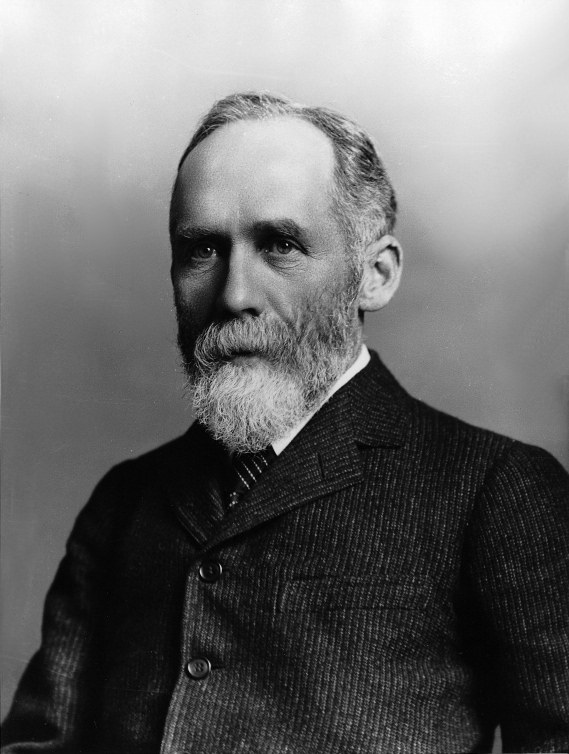
- Born: James Leveson Ross; 1848; Cromarty, Scotland
- Died: 20 September 1913 (aged 64–65); Montreal, Quebec, Canada
- Education: Inverness Royal Academy
- Occupations: Civil engineer, businessman and philanthropist
- Spouse: Annie Kerr
- Children: J. K. L. Ross
- Parent(s): Captain John R. Ross; Mary B. McKeddie

James Leveson Ross (1848 – 20 September 1913), of Montreal, was a Scottish-born Canadian civil engineer, businessman and philanthropist. He established his fortune predominantly through railway construction, notably for the Canadian Pacific Railway, of which he was the major shareholder, and advising Lord Strathcona on railway projects in Argentina and Chile. He oversaw the electrification of street railways in Montreal, Toronto, Winnipeg, Saint John, Birmingham (England), Mexico City and São Paulo. He was president of the Dominion Bridge Company, the Mexican Power Company etc. He was Honorary Lieutenant-Colonel of the 17th Duke of York's Royal Canadian Hussars and Governor of McGill University and the Royal Victoria Hospital. He was an avid collector of the Old Masters and president of the Montreal Museum of Fine Arts. He owned several yachts including two named Glencairn and became the first Canadian to be made a member of the Royal Yacht Squadron. He funded the construction of the Ross Memorial Wing at the Royal Vic; the Ross Memorial Hospital and Nurse's Home at Lindsay, Ontario; and the Protestant Hospital for the Insane at Verdun, Quebec. He lived in the Golden Square Mile.

== Early life ==
Ross was born in 1848 at Cromarty, Scotland. He was the eldest son of Captain John R. Ross (d. 1889), a merchant and shipowner, and his wife Mary B. McKeddie (1826–1896), daughter of Captain McKeddie of Newcastle-on-Tyne. Ross was educated at Inverness Royal Academy and afterwards trained as a civil engineer in England. He worked for a while in a railway, harbour and water works before coming to the United States in 1868 to apply his talents to the rapidly expanding North American railway industry. In 1870, he was appointed engineer, then chief engineer, of the Ulster and Delaware Railroad.

== Career ==
=== Railway engineer ===
After marrying in 1872 (see notes below on his family), Ross became chief engineer of the Wisconsin Central Railway and then the Lake Ontario Shore Railroad. On Lake Ontario, Ross came into contact with George Laidlaw and several other well-connected railway promoters, who persuaded him to come to Canada. He was appointed chief engineer of Laidlaw's Victoria Railway, and in 1879, he built the Credit Valley Railway. Ross was then appointed as acting consulting engineer for the Ontario and Quebec Railway, during which time he came into contact with three ambitious young men, namely William Mackenzie, Donald Mann and Herbert S. Holt.

After slow progress was being made in connecting the Canadian Pacific Railway west of Winnipeg, in 1883 under new CEO William Cornelius Van Horne, the company formed the wholly owned North American Railway Contracting Company (NARCC). With the brief to meet up with the team driving east from the Pacific Ocean under Andrew Onderdonk, Ross was appointed general manager and chief engineer of the NARCC, and he immediately employed the services of Mackenzie, Mann, and Holt. Starting at Swift Current, they built 623 miles (1,003 km) of railway to Craigellachie, British Columbia, by 7 November 1885, over the Rocky Mountains, the Selkirks and the Gold Range. Completing the project a year ahead of time, Van Horne commented at the opening of the line that Ross's record meant millions to the Canadian Pacific Railway. In achieving this, Ross stuck up a lifelong friendship with Donald Smith, 1st Baron Strathcona and Mount Royal, who drove "The Last Spike".

In 1886, Ross was appointed manager of construction for the Ontario and Quebec Railway, filling in gaps to allow full access into the CPR's Montreal to Windsor line, and onwards to the Michigan Central Railroad. Ross then negotiated the entry of the CPR into the American state of Maine, building the International Railway of Maine east from Montreal into an Atlantic Ocean terminal in Bangor, with an extension to Saint John. Ross then completed extensions of the CPR west of the Rockies to enable full access to the Pacific. At the time of his death, he was still a director of the CPR and was said to have been the company's largest shareholder.

=== Railway investor ===
Having completed his work at the CPR, he advised both Lord Strathcona and William Mackenzie on railway contracts in South America, netting US$20 million alone for consulting work in Argentina and Chile. He also formed a railway consulting and contracting company with Mackenzie, Mann and Holt, with:

- Ross as general manager,
- Mann preparing and grading roadbeds,
- Mackenzie cutting the ties and organising timber work for trestles and bridges, and
- Holt laying track, general finishing, and clean-up work.

Advising on and constructing feeder lines north from the CPR mainline, the company completed early work on the Winnipeg and Hudson Bay Railway, and constructed both the Regina and Long Lake Railway and the Calgary and Edmonton Railway. The partners also negotiated the incorporation of several land development companies, including the Calgary and Edmonton Land Company and the Canada Land and Investment Company. In a later 1887 partnership with George Stephen, 1st Baron Mount Stephen and Van Horne, they established the Lake of the Woods Milling Company, which bought and processed grain. In 1889, Ross became first president of the Columbia River Lumber Company, which provided timber for railways and housing projects.

=== Street cars and electricity ===
After moving to Montreal in 1888, in partnership with William Mackenzie, he oversaw the electrification of street railways in Montreal, Saint John, the Toronto Street Railway and Winnipeg Transit. They later took over the City of Birmingham Tramways Company Ltd in England, reorganising and electrifying that.

Mackenzie then looked for other opportunities in South America, resulting in similar projects in Mexico City and the highly profitable São Paulo Tramway, Light and Power Company, whose holding company later acted as a holding company for all of the team's Canadian and global street car investments.

As the partners recognised the need for clean electricity, they each became involved in local hydro electric projects. Ross through investment became first president of the Mexican Power Company, which developed a hydro electric dam at Necaxa to provide electricity for Mexico City.

=== Dominion Bridge, Coal and Steel ===
In 1890, Ross replaced Job Abbott as president of Dominion Bridge Company, a major contractor to the CPR for replacing wooden bridges with stronger and lower-maintenance steel replacements. Although credited to the drive of Ross, vice-president James Pawley Dawes led the development via joint-venture with the St Lawrence Bridge Company to construct the Quebec Bridge.

Ross saw the great need for steel, and formed a syndicate to buy the Dominion Coal Company. Investing in further shares independently, Ross built up such a huge stake in Dominion Coal that he was invited to join the board of the Dominion Iron and Steel Company. However, his influence could not resolve a long contract dispute between the two for the supply of high-grade coal at a disadvantageous price, which resulted in a case review at the High Court of Justice in London, England. Although fault was found on both sides, the contract was found to be legal. Ross resigned from both boards, thus allowing a later merger between the two companies.

== Private life ==
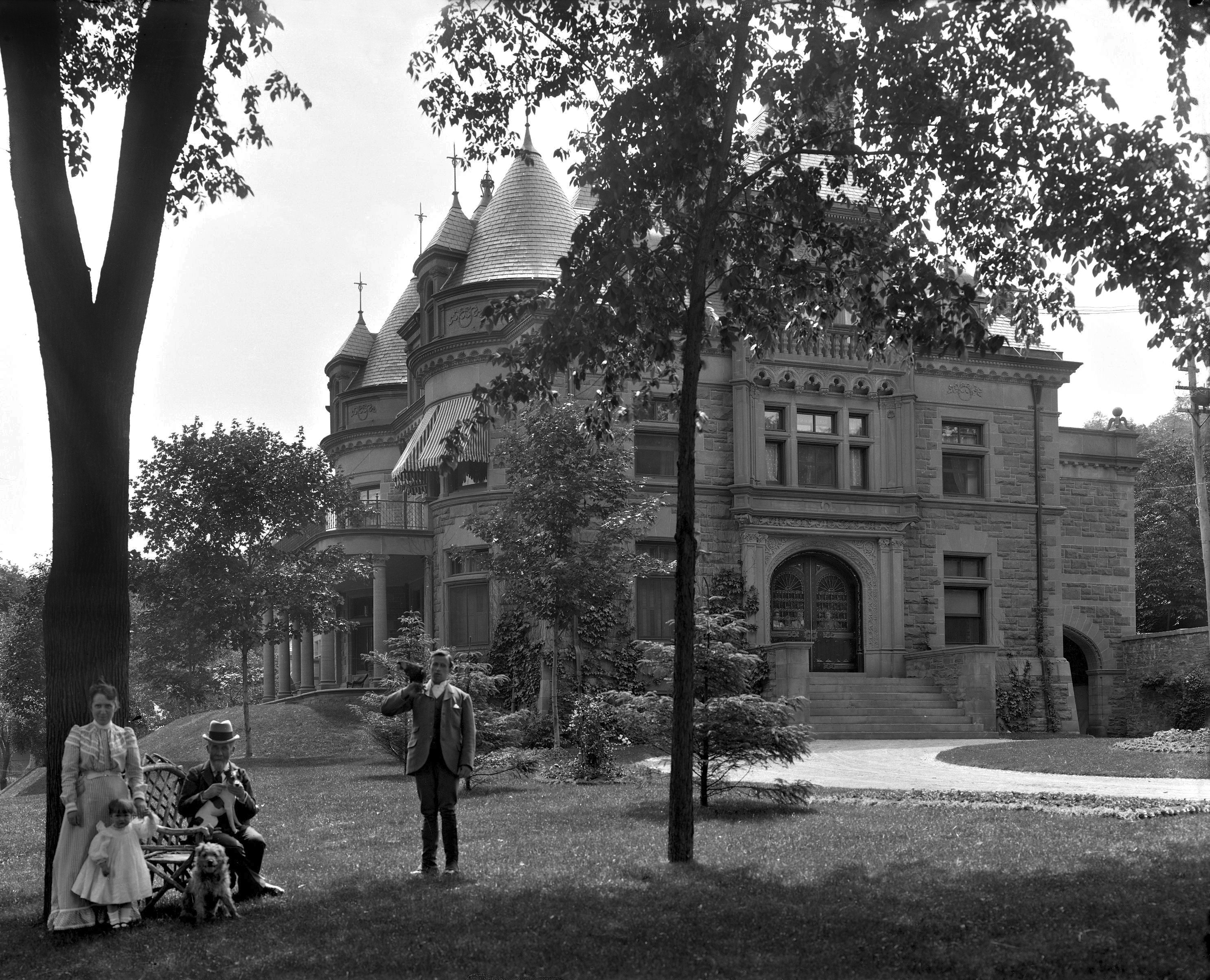
James Ross with his son, grandson and nurse outside his home at 3644 Peel Street in Montreal, c. 1910

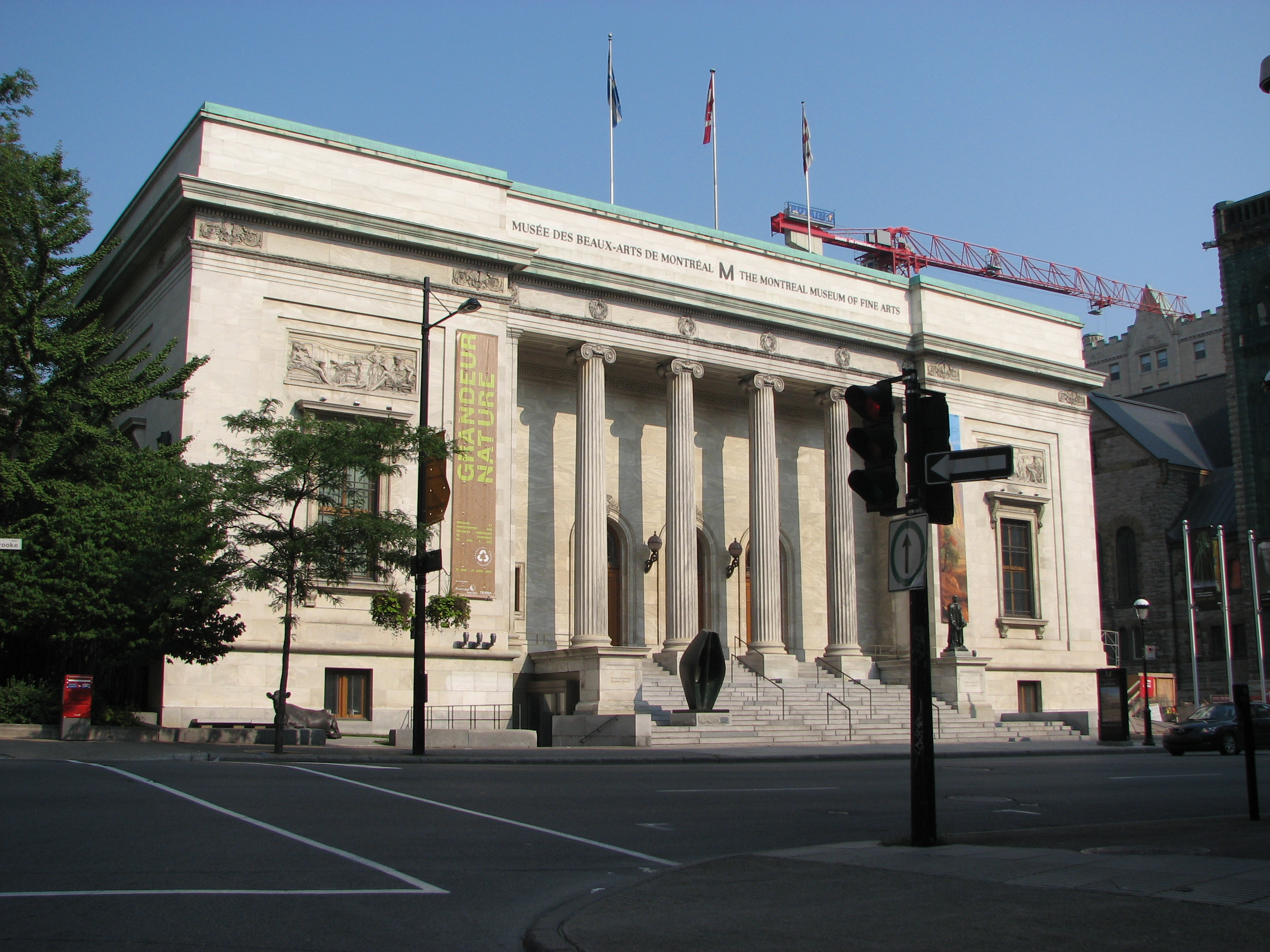
Montreal Museum of Fine Arts

In 1892, architect Bruce Price completed a French château-style mansion for Ross at 3644 Peel Street in Montreal's Golden Square Mile. Between 1897 and 1912, the Maxwell brothers (Edward and William Maxwell) expanded the house, adding an art gallery among other rooms.

Ross' only child, Jack Ross, had a house built for himself across the road at 3647 Peel Street, which was designed by the Maxwell brothers and completed in 1910. However, after the death of his parents, he moved back to his childhood home. He hired the firm of Trowbridge & Livingston, again expanding and remodeling the family mansion. After Jack Ross was declared bankrupt in 1928, the mansion was purchased in 1948 by businessman J.W. McConnell. He then donated it to McGill University, and the building was renamed Chancellor Day Hall (now called Old Chancellor Day Hall). It has been used since that time by the McGill University Faculty of Law. In December 2017, representatives of the Clan Ross Association of Canada and members of the McGill Faculty of Law unveiled a plaque commemorating Ross. The plaque is located near the main entrance of Old Chancellor Day Hall.

Ross had a passion for art and became a significant collector. At the time of his death, he had amassed one of the largest and finest collections of Old Masters on the North American continent. Through this passion, Ross became president of the Montreal Art Association, leaving much of his collection to the museum on his death.

Ross' father had been a shipowner, and Ross too had become a keen sailor after settling in Montreal in 1888. He was made honorary Commodore of the Royal St. Lawrence Yacht Club. He was a member of the New York Yacht Club and the first Canadian member of the Royal Yacht Squadron and the Royal Thames Yacht Club, both in England. He owned several yachts during his lifetime, including the Glencairn, which won the coveted and prestigious Seawanhaka Corinthian Cup for half-raters in American waters, 1896. However, his most famous yacht was the Liberty, purchased in 1912 from the deceased newspaper magnate Joseph Pulitzer. The yacht (which he renamed Glencairn after his previous vessel) required a staff of sixty-five and had a full auditorium, numerous state rooms, and first-class dining rooms. He undertook a cruise around the world in the hope that it would restore his health, but he died soon after returning to Montreal.

After retiring from engineering and active investment, Ross sat on the boards of numerous companies, including the Bank of Montreal and the Royal Trust Company. He was a member of both the American and the Canadian Society of Civil Engineers, and he was appointed honorary Lieutenant-Colonel of the 17th Duke of York's Royal Canadian Hussars. He was a Trustee of Bishop's College School, Governor of the Royal Victoria Hospital, Montreal, and of McGill University, donating generously to all institutions. Ross was a member of several clubs not already mentioned, including the Constitutional Club in London, the Manhattan Club in New York City, and the Montreal Hunt, Jockey, Royal Golf and Racquet Clubs.

== Philanthropy ==
Throughout his lifetime, and in his will, Ross made numerous donations to various charitable and cultural institutions. In memory of his parents, at Lindsay, Ontario, he built the Ross Memorial Hospital and a Nurse's Home. During his lifetime he had donated generously to the Alexandra Hospital and the Royal Victoria Hospital, both in Montreal. In his will, he directed his son, J.K.L. Ross, to continue his support of the Royal Vic, by way of which his son gave $1 million to construct the Ross Memorial Pavilion in 1915. He also built the Protestant Hospital for the Insane at Verdun, Quebec, of which he became a Governor.

Ross was a generous donor to McGill University, and he made several donations of $25,000 during his lifetime to the Montreal Art Association and towards the building of the Montreal Museum of Fine Arts in 1912. In his will, he left the Art Association a further $100,000 and much of his collection of Old Masters.

== Family ==
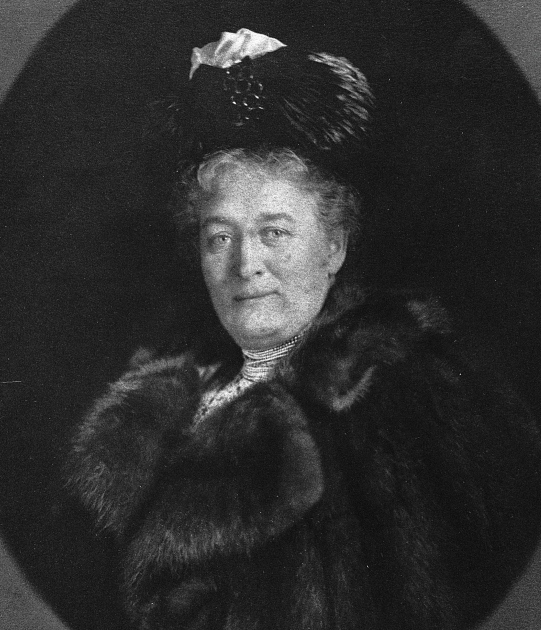
Mrs Annie (Kerr) Ross (1847–1915)

In 1872, Ross had married Annie Kerr (1847–1915), the eldest daughter of John W. Kerr (1824–1904), of Kingston, New York, and his wife Eliza Davis (1824-1899). His father-in-law was a prominent politician with the Democratic Party and formerly the Sheriff of Ulster County, New York.

The Rosses were the parents of one son, John Kenneth Leveson Ross. In 1902, he married Ethel Matthews, daughter of Wilmot Deloui Matthews (1850–1919) of Toronto. They were the parents of a son and a daughter. They divorced in 1930 and the following year, in Jamaica, he married Iris de Lisser, sister of H. G. de Lisser.

Towards the end of his life, Ross devoted most of his time to sailing in European and Canadian waters. Following his around the world trip aboard his yacht Glencairn, Ross died of existing heart complications at his home in the Golden Square Mile on 20 September 1913.

== See also ==
- List of Bishop's College School alumni
