= Credit Valley Railway =

Railway located in Ontario, Canada

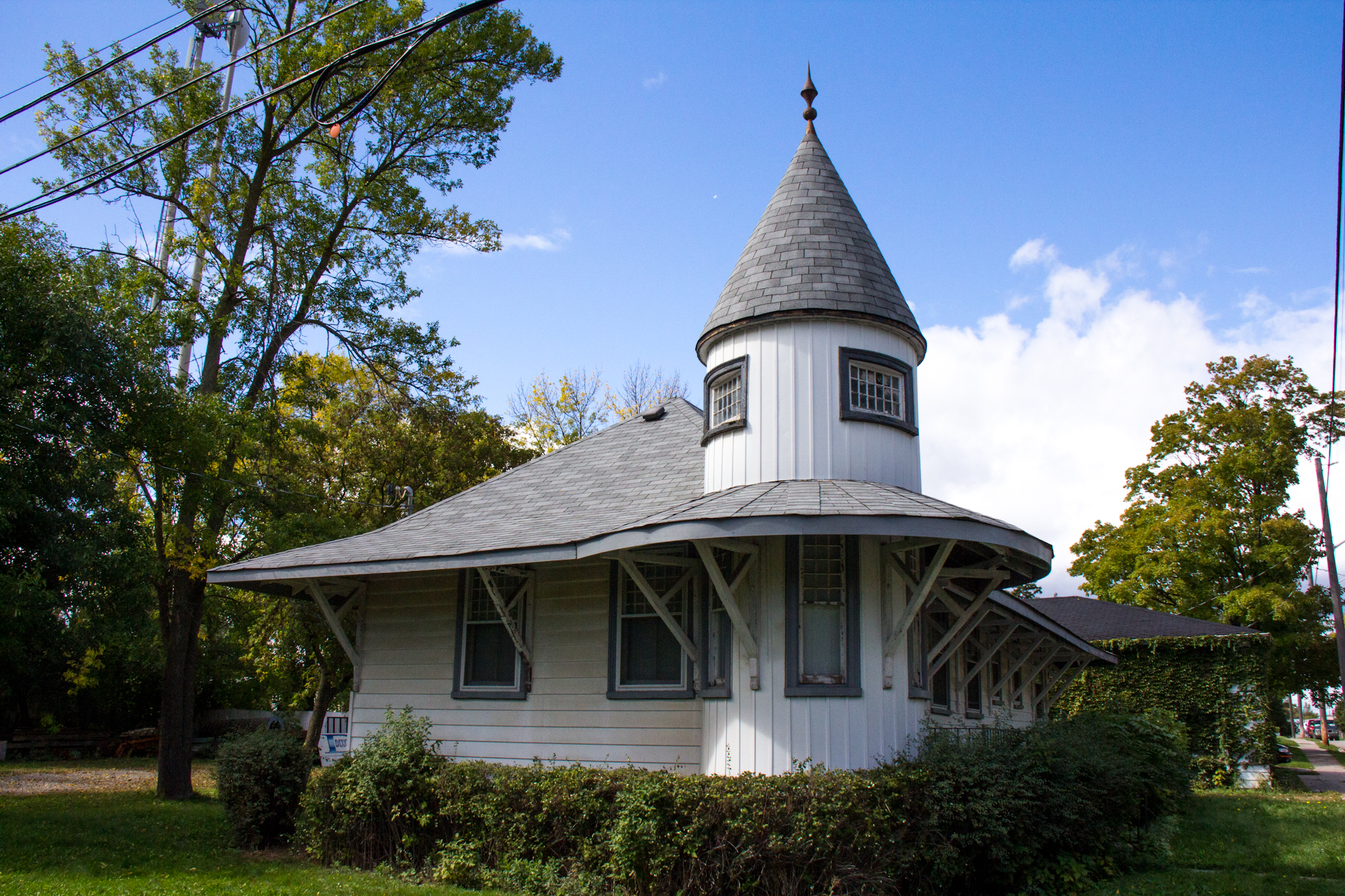
- CVR station in Streetsville. A new station was built in 1914, and the original building was moved to a different location.

Overview
- Reporting mark: CVR
- Locale: Ontario
- Dates of operation: 1871–1883
- Successor: Canadian Pacific Railway

Technical
- Track gauge: 4 ft 8 1/2 in (1,435 mm)
- Previous gauge: 3 ft 6 in (1,067 mm)

The Credit Valley Railway was a railway located in Ontario, Canada from Toronto to St. Thomas. Chartered in 1871 by Ontario railway magnate George Laidlaw, it operated as an independent company until 1883 when it was leased by the Ontario and Quebec Railway, a Canadian Pacific Railway (CPR) operating company building a network of lines in southern Ontario.

The section from Toronto to Woodstock remains in use as the CPR mainline through Ontario, forming portions of what is now the Galt and Windsor Subdivisions. The section from Woodstock to St. Thomas is operated by OSR as a short line railway. Until recently, the branch to Orangeville was currently operated as the Orangeville Brampton Railway; it will become a walking path. The Elora branch was abandoned and converted to rail trail use.

== History ==
=== Formation ===
Following initial discussions held in Milton and Brampton in 1870, the Credit Valley Railway was incorporated by Act of the Legislative Assembly of Ontario in 1871, authorized to build a railway line from Toronto to Orangeville, with branches to Milton, Galt (today part of Cambridge), Berlin (Kitchener) and Waterloo. Later Acts authorized further branches from the Forks of the Credit to Salem, and from Galt to St. Thomas, where it would connect with the Canada Southern Railway. There was also discussion on extending the line to Port Burwell.

In addition to the issue of shares and debt, the CVR's construction was subsidized through other forms of public funding:

CVR public funding by source (to 1880)
Source	Amount
Bonuses contingent on construction of the line	$1,035,000
Exchange of municipal debentures for railway bonds	$75,000
Interest earned on subscriptions	$100,000
Provincial construction subsidy	$420,000
Total public funding	$1,630,000

The CVR's president was George Laidlaw, and its chief engineer was James Ross, who later became general manager. Other key players in the company were William Mackenzie, Herbert Samuel Holt and Henry Suckling.

=== Construction ===
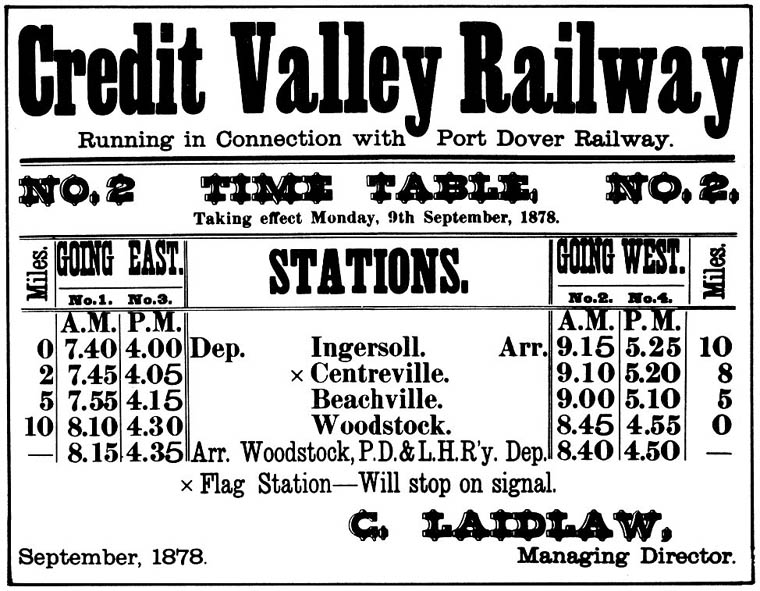
Timetable from 1878 for Ingersoll-Woodstock section of CVR.

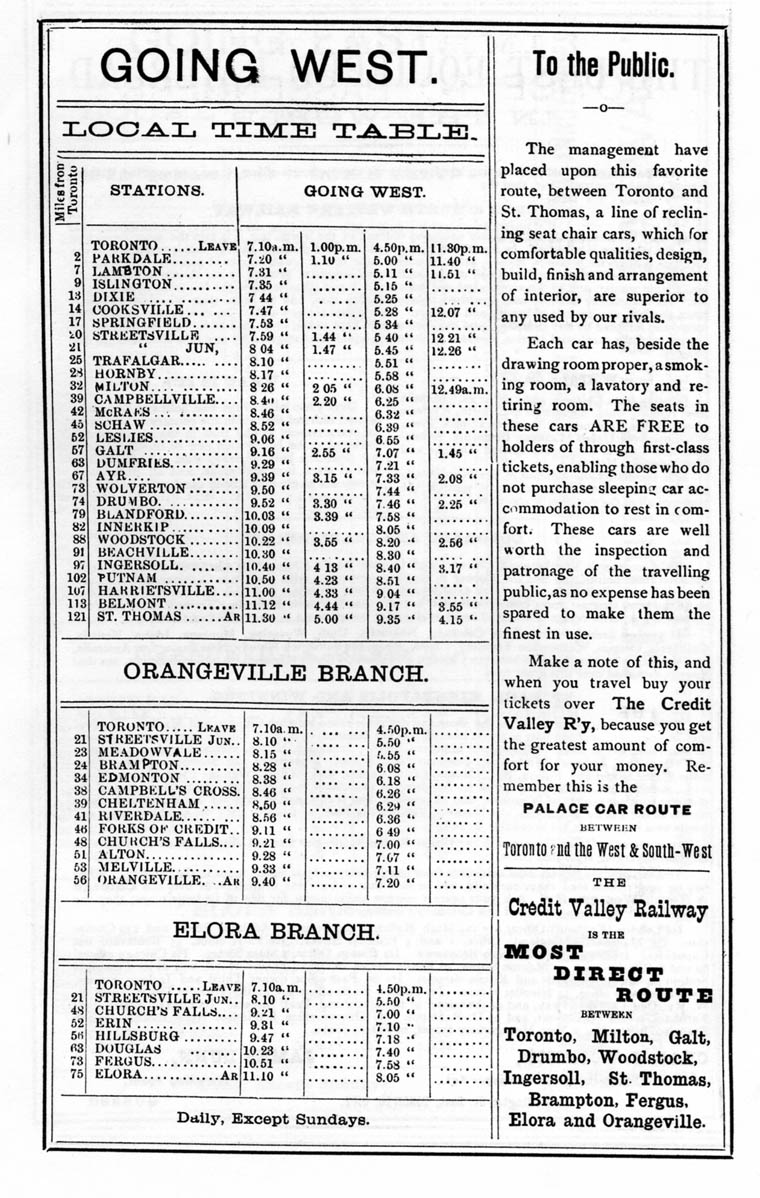
Timetable from 1883, showing lines and stations served.

Originally intended to be an auxiliary narrow gauge line to the Toronto Grey & Bruce Railway, by 1873 its design was changed to standard gauge in order to enable it to become a rival to the Grand Trunk and Great Western lines.

The rail network eventually went from Toronto to Orangeville with branch lines from Cataract to Elora and Streetsville to St. Thomas. Construction occurred in several stages:

- Survey work was done in 1873, with grading beginning early in 1874
- Work was suspended in 1875, and resumed in earnest in the autumn of 1878 following negotiations with the various municipalities for connected bonuses and bond subscriptions
- The line opened from Parkdale railway station to Milton, Ontario in 1877.
- The track reached Brampton, Ontario in December 1878, and the huge trestle spanning the Credit River near the Credit Forks was completed in September 1879. A station was built at the Forks of the Credit.
- The Milton line was extended to Galt, Ontario in September 1879.
- The line was opened to Orangeville and Elora, Ontario in December 1879.

The Galt line was extended to St. Thomas through a parallel works project:

- a section between Ingersoll and Woodstock was in operation in September 1878, connecting with the Port Dover & Lake Huron Railway
- freight service between Ayr and Ingersoll began in October 1879
- in December 1879, the CVR bridge over the Grand River was opened to rail traffic, and service between Ingersoll and Toronto began in January 1880 A test run over the bridge during that month had proved to be successful. By that time, the company had built basic freight and passenger buildings in Galt.
- through service to St. Thomas began in September 1881. It was formally opened in September 1879 by the Governor General of Canada, the Marquis of Lorne. Earlier that year, a carriage carrying its directors on a recently opened length of track was run into by a locomotive, and all suffered serious injuries, of which one was fatal.

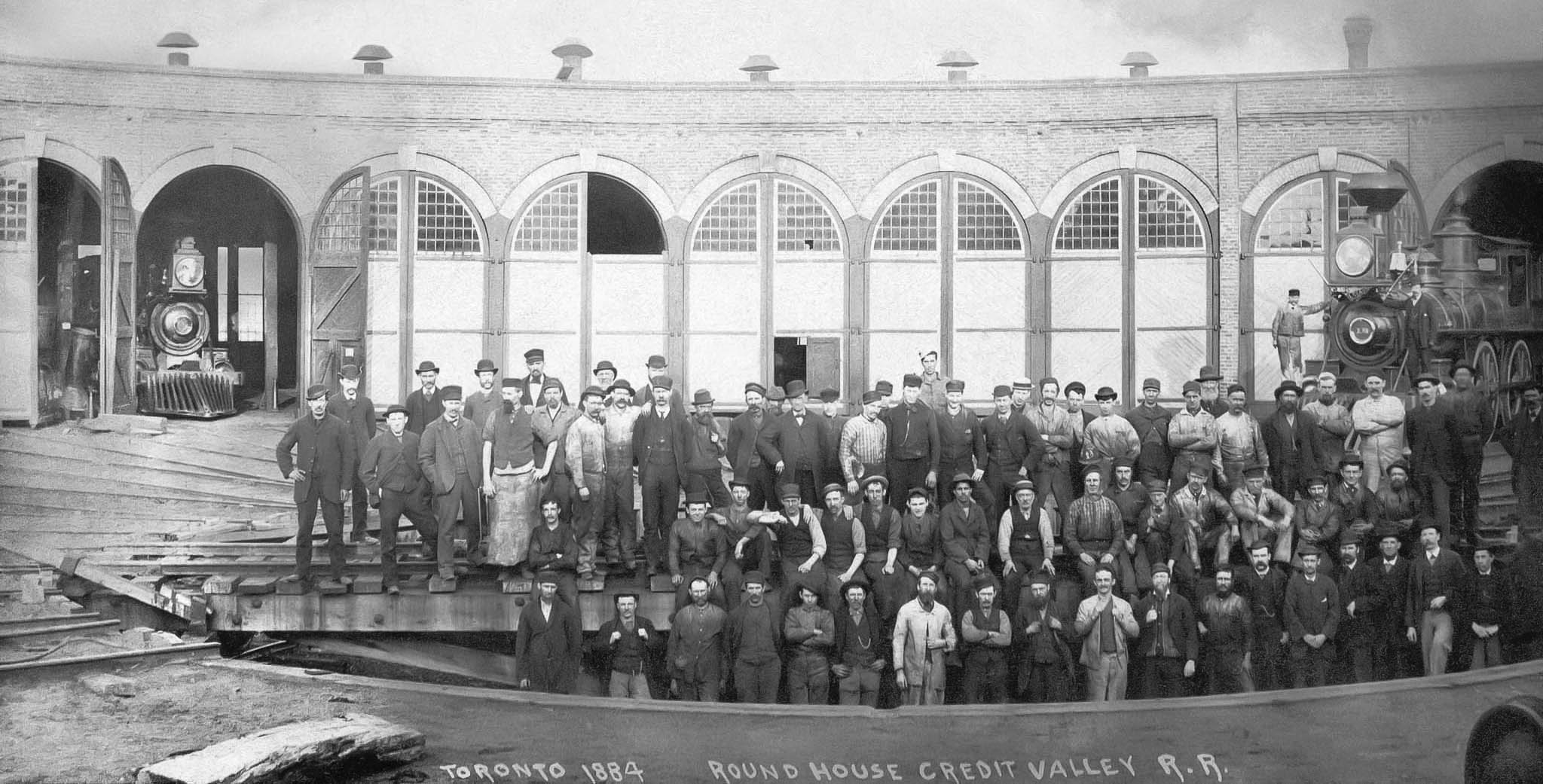
Parkdale roundhouse in 1884.

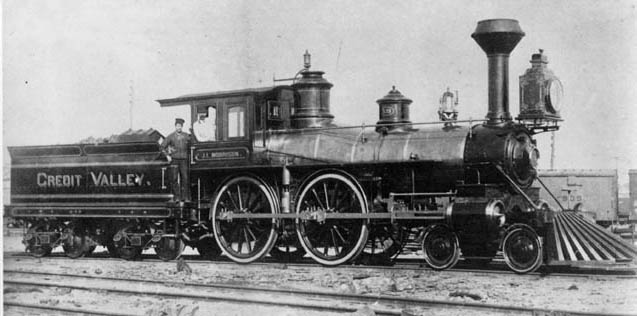
CVR locomotive (1881).

- the line passing through Galt was taken over by the Canadian Pacific Railway in 1883; the company built a brick passenger building that still stands.

=== Extension to Toronto waterfront ===
The CVR's extension from Parkdale to the waterfront lots in Toronto was met with stiff opposition from the Grand Trunk Railway and the Northern Railway of Canada. In July 1879, the Railway Committee of the Privy Council of Canada ordered that the line be extended to the Esplanade, but the other railways later secured a court order declaring that it did not constitute a right of way. The Parliament of Canada subsequently passed an Act on the matter in 1880 (which attracted considerable controversy during its debate as it concerned a provincially incorporated railway). All remaining disputes were later resolved through arbitration, leading to connection to the Union Station later that year.

By arrangement with the Michigan Central Railroad, the CVR offered through train service between Toronto and Chicago.

=== Financial stress ===
The CVR experienced financial difficulties at various points in its existence, which mainly arose from the effects of the worldwide Long Depression. During its construction, concerns were expressed as to whether it would result in overcapacity in providing rail traffic west of Toronto, which the Toronto Telegram noted:

The enterprise was conceived in folly and nurtured in scheming. Even were it in running order at this moment, it would starve to death for lack of support. It runs midway between the Grand Trunk and Great Western lines, and is as necessary to the welfare of Toronto as would be a sidewalk for passengers down the middle of Yonge Street with the pavement on each side.

Such concerns continued to be expressed after its opening, as existing competition between the GTR and the GWR had already depressed freight rates on that corridor.

As early as 1874, it received approval to settle certain debts through exchange into shares, and in 1876, it was requesting that the provincial construction subsidy of $2000/mile be increased to $3500/mile. In 1877, it had to obtain longer terms with respect to the bonds it had issued. Existing provisions allowing municipalities that subsidized the CVR to appoint directors to its board were broadened in 1878, and further provision for exchanging bonds was made in 1880 and 1881. George Stephen played a significant role in bailing out the CVR in 1880, together with a group of entrepreneurs organized by E.B. Osler, when the lack of cash prompted a strike over wages being three months in arrears.

Upon its completion in 1881, these difficulties were still present, and discussions arose on the possibility of a lease to the Great Western Railway, while other discussions occurred at the same time concerning the GWR being leased to the CPR. The GWR was eventually leased to the Grand Trunk Railway, and the CPR (through the Ontario and Quebec Railway) acquired the CVR following its acquisition of a 999-year lease to a railway line between Woodstock and London from the London Junction Railway. The CVR was amalgamated with the O&Q in 1883. In the following year, The O&Q was taken over by the CPR on January 4.

In 1888, William Van Horne admitted at a meeting that the CPR had been dealing with problems arising from the original construction of the track, declaring, "It takes all our time to try and straighten out the line of the Credit Valley Railway, laid down and built by Mr. Laidlaw, because it is so crooked."

== Current status of lines ==
The line from Toronto to Woodstock now forms part of CP's Galt Subdivision and Windsor Subdivision. The section from Woodstock to St. Thomas is operated by Ontario Southland Railway. The Orangeville branch is now operated by the Orangeville Brampton Railway. The Elora branch was closed in 1987, and has since been converted into a trail by the Credit Valley Conservation Authority and the Grand River Conservation Authority.

== See also ==
- List of Ontario railways
- List of defunct Canadian railways
