= Ontario West Shore Railway =

Defunct railway line in Ontario, Canada

The Ontario West Shore Railway is a historic railway that was constructed in Ontario, Canada, which collapsed in a spectacular fraud.

The company started construction on a railway line between Goderich and Kincardine in the early 1900s, but the line was never completed. The company's president was J. W. Moyes of Toronto, Ontario, a consulting engineer and previously the general manager of the Metropolitan Railway.

== Formation ==
The original intention was to construct an electric rail line that would connect the Grand Trunk Railway's terminals on Lake Huron and Georgian Bay. The promoters of the line wanted to connect Huron, Bruce and Middlesex counties together as the "Huron, Bruce and Middlesex Railway" but discussions at the Legislative Assembly of Ontario persuaded the group to focus more on Grey County in place of Middlesex.

In 1902, the "Huron, Bruce and Grey Electric Railway" was incorporated, and authorized to construct a main electric line from Goderich via Kincardine to Owen Sound, with a branch line to Wiarton and a circle line within Huron County to Walton, Seaforth, Clinton and back to Goderich, having subsidiary branch lines to Dungannon and Wroxeter, The railway's construction had to commence by 1904, and be in operation by 1907.

The promoters offered to sell shares in the railway to the municipalities through which the initial line would run:

OWSR stock purchase proposals, by municipality (1902-1903)
Municipality	Amount	Approved by voters
Town of Goderich	$50,000	✓
Township of Ashfield	$50,000	✗
Township of Colborne	$25,000	✗
Township of West Wawanosh	$25,000	✗

In 1903, the railway became the Ontario West Shore Electric Railway Company, and it received further authorization to extend the Dungannon branch to Lucknow and Walkerton, as well as a southern line to Sarnia with a branch from Saint Joseph to Hensall.

== Construction and demise ==
As construction had not commenced by 1904, the railway charter lapsed. It was revived in 1906, subject to capital being raised within two years and the line built and completed by 1910, Upon assurances by Moyes that he would be able to raise the necessary funds, the following municipalities provided guarantees totalling $400,000 ($11,247,000 in current terms) for the bonds to be issued, as ratified by the Legislative Assembly of Ontario:

OWSR bond guarantees, by municipality
County	Municipality	Amount
Huron	Town of Goderich	$150,000
Huron	Township of Ashfield	$125,000
Bruce	Town of Kincardine	$50,000
Bruce	Township of Huron	$75,000

The railway received further authorization to construct a line from Grand Bend to London, with a branch line towards St Marys and Stratford. In 1909, the bonds (totalling $600,000, $16,870,000 in current terms) were issued by indenture, (Note: The trustee for the indenture was Toronto General Trusts, one of the predecessors of TD Canada Trust.) and the railway's name was shortened to "Ontario West Shore Railway Company".

In 1908, a contract was secured to construct a line from Sarnia to Owen Sound, and work on the track started in Port Albert. By August 1911, the railroad was completed from Goderich to Kintail, a distance of 16 miles (26 km). Only one carload of flour was hauled 11 miles (18 km) along the line, before the company became insolvent.

In January 1912, the company defaulted on its bonds. Upon investigation, it was discovered that the contract holder for the line, Huron Construction Company, was not constituted as a separate corporation but was in reality Moyes carrying on business under an assumed name, and that he had defrauded all the liquid assets of the company. Bookkeeping was determined to be nonexistent, and the railway funds were deposited into eight bank accounts not associated with the company, of which five were in Moyes' name. The report stated that Moyes "was the sole initiating, efficient actor thruout [sic], the others who appeared on the stage ... being admittedly mere agents moved by him and doing his will." He absconded to the US, where he died in 1937. Emergency legislation was passed in 1913 to place all property, rights and privileges related to the railway into trusteeship, and the municipal guarantees were not fully settled until the 1940s. By 1938, the municipalities had already paid $1 million ($21,325,000 in current terms), being the guaranteed amount plus accrued interest, but a deficiency of $13,095 ($279,000 in current terms) in the underlying sinking fund meant that a further 10-year debenture had to be issued to cover the shortfall.

Most of the right of way was subsequently subsumed into the realignment of Ontario Highway 21, for which the Ontario Department of Highways did not make any payment (being about $6,363) until December 1945. Only one remnant of track remains, together with a memorial plaque, at a site 5 miles (8 km) north of Goderich.

== See also ==
- List of Ontario railways
- List of defunct Canadian railways
