= Brockville, Westport and North-Western Railway =

Railway in Ontario, Canada

Overview
- Dates of operation: 1888–1919
- Successor: Canadian Northern Railway; Westport Subdivision

Technical
- Track gauge: 4 ft 8 1/2 in (1,435 mm) standard gauge

The Brockville, Westport and North-Western Railway was a railway in Eastern Ontario, Canada. It was founded in 1884 as the Brockville, Westport & Sault Ste Marie Railway. Construction began in 1886 heading north-west from Brockville, Ontario to Westport, Ontario. The line opened March 4, 1888, between Westport and Brockville. From Lyn Junction to Brockville, the railway used trackage rights on the Grand Trunk Railway. In 1889, the line from Lyn Junction to Brockville opened. In 1894 the company was placed into receivership, and in 1903 it was sold by the court to a New York–based syndicate (Holm-Gerken-Schmitt-King) for $160,000 and re-incorporated as the Brockville, Westport and Northwestern Railway. The line was sold to William Mackenzie and Donald Mann from the Canadian Northern Railway in 1910, and was eventually amalgamated into the Canadian National Railways in 1919.

In 1921, passenger service was maintained by a 20-passenger REO gasoline-powered railcar. The line was abandoned from Lyn Junction to Brockville in 1922, and from Lyn Junction to the Phillips Cables plant in 1925.

An application to abandon the line from Lyn Junction to Westport was filed with the Board of Transport Commissioners in June 1951 and was approved (order number #49236) in 1952. Service ended on the line August 30, 1952, and was scrapped in late 1952 into the summer of 1953.

== See also ==
- List of Ontario railways
- List of defunct Canadian railways
