= SY Liberty =

Steam yacht (1908–1938)

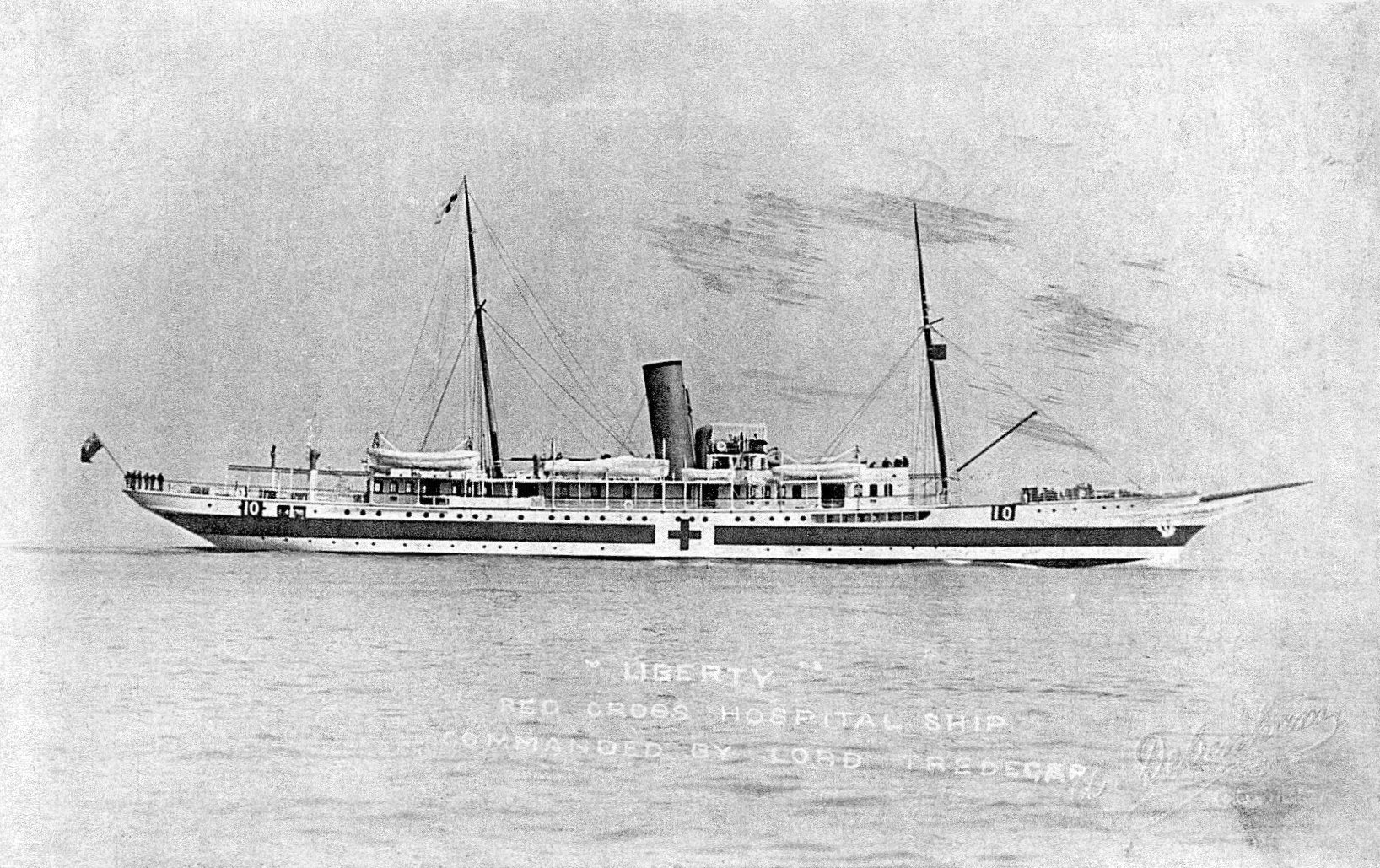
- Liberty as a Royal Navy Hospital Ship

History
- Name: Liberty (1908-1912); Glencairn (1912-1914); Liberty (1914-1938)
- Owner: Joseph Pulitzer (1908-1911); James Ross (1912-1914); Lord Tredegar (1914-1920); Sir Robert Houston (1920-1926); Lucy, Lady Houston (1926-1936)
- Port of registry: Leith (1908)United Kingdom; USA (1908-1912)USA; Portsmouth (1912-1924)United Kingdom; Jersey (1924-1938)United Kingdom
- Builder: Ramage & Ferguson Ltd, Leith
- Cost: US$1.5 million
- Launched: 5 December 1907
- In service: 1908
- Out of service: 1938
- Identification: 1908, 1912-1938: British O.N. 125480
- Fate: Scrapped

General characteristics
- Type: Steam Yacht
- Tonnage: 1,607grt, 887nrt
- Length: 268.6 ft (81.9 m)
- Beam: 35.6 ft (10.9 m)
- Depth of hold: 17.9 ft (5.5 m)
- Propulsion: Twin screw

SY Liberty was a steam yacht built in 1908 at Leith, Scotland, for Joseph Pulitzer and one of the largest private yachts of its day. She served as a Royal Navy hospital ship during World War I.

== Description ==
The steam yacht Liberty was designed by G L Watson & Co and launched by Ramage & Ferguson Ltd at Leith on 5 December 1907. With a tonnage of 1,607grt, length of 268.6 feet (81.9 m) and beam of 35.6 feet (10.9 m), she was a large yacht by the standards of the day. She had twin screws, powered by two triple expansion steam engines made by the shipbuilder.

In addition to the expected high level of luxury, Liberty was especially fitted with ramps and soundproofing due to Pulitzer's blindness and extreme sensitivity to noise, and was nicknamed "The Tower of Silence".

== History ==
Liberty was built in 1908 at a cost of US$1.5 million for newspaper publisher Joseph Pulitzer, who died on board at Charleston, South Carolina on 29 October 1911. She was sold to Scottish-Canadian businessman James Ross, renamed Glencairn and registered in Portsmouth, England. Ross sailed around the world in her in 1912, hoping to improve his health, but died the following year. In 1914 she was purchased by Lord Tredegar, who reverted her name to the original Liberty.

In September 1915 she was requisitioned by the Royal Navy for the duration of World War I, initially as an auxiliary patrol yacht Liberty IV, though soon transformed at Lord Tredegar's expense to a hospital ship, No. 10, HMHS Liberty, first operating within the North Sea and for much of the time under the command of her owner. She was returned to Lord Tredegar in January 1919.

After completion in December 1919 of a refit at Cowes as a yacht, Lord Tredegar embarked on Liberty for a six-month cruise in the Mediterranean and Red Seas. After further summer cruising, he sold her to the shipping magnate Sir Robert Houston in September 1920. Following his marriage in 1924, Houston moved his residence to Jersey for tax reasons and also re-registered his yacht there. Like Pulitzer, he died on board the yacht, on 14 April 1926.

Left in his will to his wife Lucy, Lady Houston, she lived aboard Liberty much of the time. In the 1930s, to express her hatred for former prime minister Ramsay MacDonald, she hung a huge electric sign "Down with MacDonald the Traitor" in the rigging and sailed round the British Isles in her.

After the death of Lady Houston in 1936, Liberty was sold to John Cashmore Ltd for scrap and towed to Newport, Monmouthshire to be dismantled in January 1938.

== See also ==
- List of hospitals and hospital ships of the Royal Navy
