= Orangeville-Brampton Railway =

Short line railway

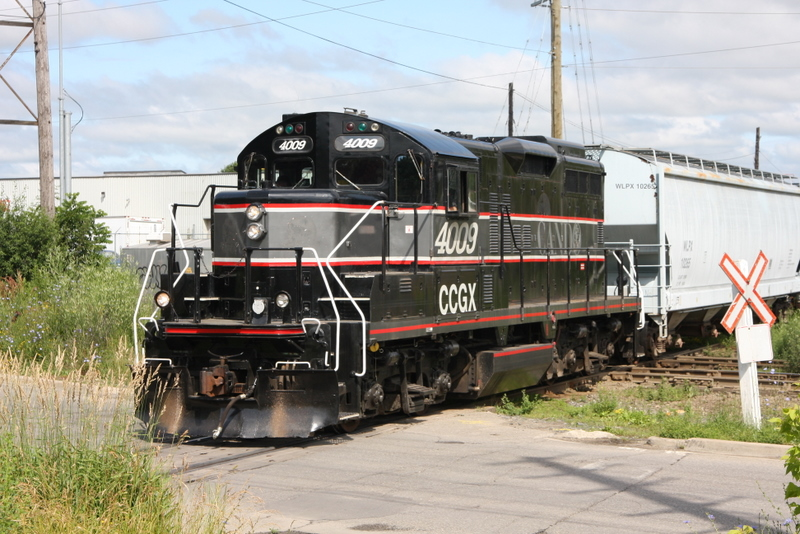
- CCGX 4009 crosses Railroad Street and the CN Halton Subdivision in Brampton

Overview
- Reporting mark: OBRY
- Locale: Ontario

Technical
- Track gauge: 4 ft 8 1/2 in (1,435 mm) standard gauge

The Orangeville-Brampton Railway was a 55-kilometre (34-mile) long short line railway between Orangeville and Streetsville Junction in Mississauga, Ontario. It passed through the City of Brampton and the Town of Caledon.

At Streetsville, the OBRY connected with the Canadian Pacific Railway Galt Subdivision. At Brampton, it crossed the Canadian National Railway Halton Subdivision at grade, but no interchange traffic was handled. North of Brampton, the railway wound through the Niagara Escarpment, notable for a curved, 349-metre (1,145-foot) long trestle over the Credit River and Forks of the Credit Road, near Belfountain in Caledon.

The railway's main purpose was to service several industries in Orangeville and Brampton. However, between the fall of 2004 and spring of 2018, OBRY operated a public excursion train, marketed as Credit Valley Explorer, between Orangeville and Snelgrove (the northern edge of Brampton).

Freight trains on the line were operated by Trillium Railway under contract for OBRY (previously operated by Cando Rail Services Ltd.) and made weekday round trips (on Tuesdays and Fridays) between Orangeville and Mississauga.

A decision was made to terminate service on the line effective December 31, 2021. The last train out of Orangeville was December 17, 2021. In July 2022, municipal governments along the route in Peel Region acquired approximately 51 km of the former railway to convert to a trail that would connect to the Trans Canada Trail system.

== History ==
Most of the current OBRY route was built in the 1870s by the Credit Valley Railway (CVR), with construction completed to Orangeville (with a branch to Elora) in 1879. The CVR was purchased by the CPR in 1883, which joined the tracks of the CVR with a former rival, the Toronto, Grey and Bruce Railway (TGB), at Orangeville, in effect extending the line north from Orangeville to the TGB's terminus in Owen Sound.

Scheduled passenger service between Toronto and Owen Sound via Brampton and Orangeville ended in 1970, the Elora branch was abandoned in 1987, and the Orangeville-Owen Sound trackage was abandoned in 1995.

The Town of Orangeville purchased the Mississauga-Orangeville trackage between Mile 2.2 to Mile 34.6 of the Owen Sound Subdivision from the CPR on September 29, 2000, to ensure the line's continued existence. The line was then managed by the Orangeville Brampton Rail Development Corporation.

In early 2018, it was announced that after years of operation for the town, Cando would be discontinuing its contract to operate the line effective at the end of June 2018, and as a result, a new operator was sought by the town to operate the line. Facing an uncertain future, the Credit Valley Explorer made its final runs in February 2018, and the three passenger cars were sold off to the Waterloo Central Railway. After the final freight runs by Cando in late June 2018, new contractor Trillium Railway (later known as GIO Railways Corporation) commenced freight operations on the OBRY, starting in July 2018 with a leased locomotive.

A decision made by Orangeville Brampton Rail Access Group resulted in the termination of service on the line effective December 31, 2021. The last leader of the line would be Trillium Rail, and Orangeville mayor Sandy Brown suggested the line may become a recreational trail. The last train out of Orangeville was December 17, 2021.

== Fleet ==
- GMD GP9RM - 4 (2 Retired)
- EMD GP9 - 1 (retired)
- CC&F lightweight coach - 3 ex-VIA Rail
- Budd dome car - 1 ex-Amtrak
- Budd RDC-9 - ex-VIA Rail

Source.

== See also ==
- Barrie Collingwood Railway
- CN Halton Subdivision
- Galt Subdivision
- List of Ontario railways
- Rail transport in Ontario
