= Nipissing Central Railway =

Railway in Ontario and Quebec

- Founded: April 12, 1907
- Areas served: Swastika, Ontario – Rouyn-Noranda, Quebec
- Owner: Ontario Northland Transportation Commission
- Parent: Ontario Northland Railway

The Nipissing Central Railway (NCR), sometimes known as the Temiskaming Streetcar Line, is a railway operating in the Canadian provinces of Ontario and Quebec. The line was originally an interurban streetcar system connecting New Liskeard, Haileybury and Cobalt on the western bank of Lake Temiskaming in northern Ontario from 1910 to 1935. The operating company continues to be used to operate the Ontario Northland Railway freight spur line between Swastika, Ontario and Rouyn-Noranda, Quebec as it was incorporated under a federal charter, avoiding the need to re-charter either end in its respective provinces.

== History ==
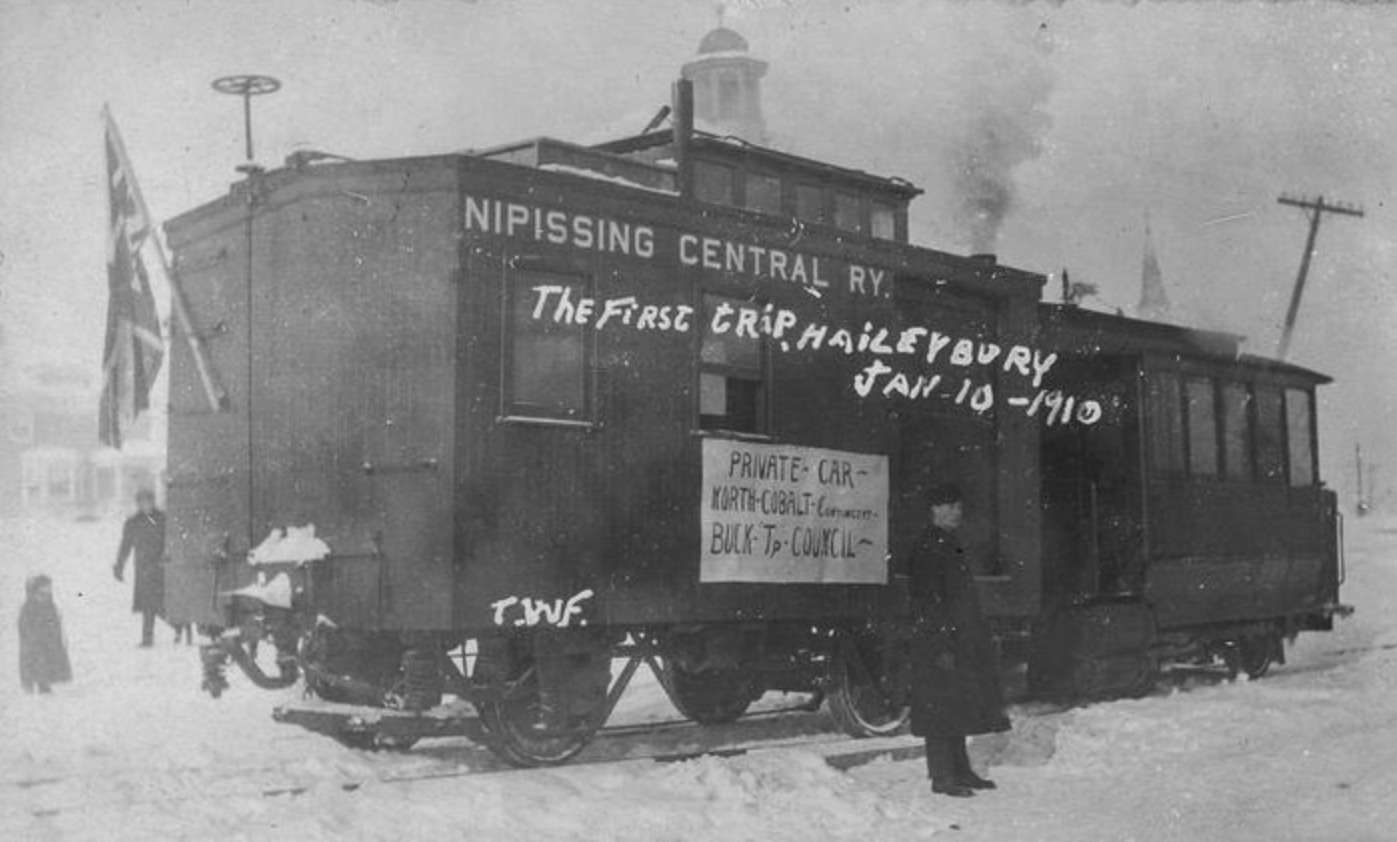
First Trip to Haileybury. January 10, 1910 The line had not yet electrified

In 1902 the Ontario government chartered the Temiskaming & Northern Ontario Railway (T&NO) to connect the towns of New Liskeard and Haileybury on Lake Temiskaming to North Bay on Lake Nipissing. During construction, silver ore was discovered near the Mile 103 post, just southwest of Haileybury. The Cobalt Silver Rush followed, leading to the incorporation of the town of Cobalt in 1906, and a swelling population reaching 10 to 15,000 by 1911.

As the population of all of the towns grew, the need for better transportation between them also grew. The Nipissing Central Railway was granted a federal (Dominion) charter on 12 April 1907, and opened the first portion of the line between Cobalt and Haileybury on 30 April 1910. The route followed King Street out of Cobalt, turning onto the city streets of what is today's North Cobalt (the outskirts of Haileybury) and turning downtown before ending at Main Street in Haileybury.

The line was purchased by the T&NO on 20 June 1911. An extension along Lake Timiskaming to New Liskeard opened on 1 November 1912, ending at Whitewood Avenue. In 1914, an existing spur line on the T&NO to Kerr Lake was electrified and joined to the NCR. This section was abandoned in 1924. Interurban operations on the NCR ended on 9 February 1935.

When the T&NO built a spur line between Swastika and Rouyn-Noranda, they operated it under the charter of the NCR, thereby avoiding problems with crossing the provincial border (the T&NO was incorporated in Ontario). The company exists to this day as the operator of the T&NO spur. The construction of the line was the subject of a legal challenge, The Attorney-General of Quebec v. The Nipissing Central Railway Company and another; it was decided in favour of the railway by the Judicial Committee of the Privy Council in 1926

== See also ==
- List of Ontario railways
- List of defunct Canadian railways
- History of rail transport in Canada
