= Port Colborne Harbour Railway =

Shortline railway in Ontario, Canada

Overview
- Headquarters: Wainfleet, Ontario
- Reporting mark: TRRY
- Locale: Port Colborne, Ontario
- Dates of operation: 1997–

Technical
- Track gauge: 4 ft 8 1/2 in (1,435 mm) standard gauge

The Port Colborne Harbour Railway (reporting mark TRRY), formed in 1997, serves various industries in the Port Colborne area and along the New Welland Canal. The principal commodities transported are wheat, scrap, woodpulp, bauxite, and lumber. The Port Colborne Harbour Railway connects with CPR in Port Colborne and with CN Rail in Merritton. Normal operation of the PCHR is Monday to Friday with weekend service done at an extra charge. The PCHR is a division of the Trillium Railway. In business since 1997, it currently operates two short line railways in Southern Ontario: the Port Colborne Harbour Railway and the Saint Thomas and Eastern Railway. Combined trackage length of the two shortlines is over 100 kilometres (62 mi).
