= George Laidlaw =

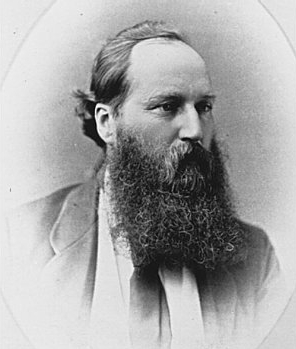
- Born: February 28, 1828; Sutherland, Scotland
- Died: August 6, 1889 (aged 61); Coboconk, Ontario

George Laidlaw (February 28, 1828 – August 6, 1889) was a businessman who promoted the development of narrow gauge railways and was invaluable in the chartering of the Toronto and Nipissing (with which his own Victoria Railway would soon compete) and the Toronto, Grey and Bruce railways in 1868. From then until his retirement in 1881, he continued to promote the initiation or extension of several other local railways, and proposed a grand plan for uniting the independent railways of southern Ontario into a competitive alternative to the Grand Trunk Railway. Though it was met with minimal success at the time, the idea was the backbone of what was to become the Canadian Pacific Railway.

Born in Scotland, Laidlaw moved to British North America in 1855 at the age of 37 and took a position with Gooderham and Worts distillery in Toronto, Ontario. Seeing the potential market for local railways in the midst of the Grand Trunk Railway's monopoly, and the lack of accessibility into rural Upper Canada by road and water, Laidlaw began to promote the idea of a 3 foot, 6 inch railway as an alternative to the more expensive standard gauge of 5 feet, 6 inches. Following the formation of the Toronto & Nipissing Railway and the Toronto, Grey and Bruce Railway, Laidlaw sought out investment for the railways, while also promoting the initializations and extensions of several independent railways, such as the Credit Valley Railway which was planned from Toronto to St. Thomas and the Victoria Railway, an extension of the Port Hope, Lindsay and Beaverton Railway (Later the Midland Railway before being absorbed by the Grand Trunk Railway) which was planned from Lindsay to the Upper Ottawa Valley.

His son, colonel George E. Laidlaw (b. 1860, d. 1927), originally a railbuilder, fought in the North-West Rebellion, as well as in the Boer War as an officer. During his time in South Africa, he collected artifacts for the Toronto Normal School and its curator David Boyle. Laidlaw had previously donated many archaeological and ethnographic artifacts from across Canada to Boyle.

George Laidlaw retired to his estate at St. Mary's on Balsam Lake in 1881, one station from the northern terminus of the Toronto and Nipissing Railway at Coboconk. He died there in 1889.
