= Ontario and Quebec Railway =

Railway in Canada

Overview
- Reporting mark: O&Q
- Locale: Ontario, Canada
- Dates of operation: 1881–1998
- Successor: St. Lawrence and Hudson Railway

Technical
- Track gauge: 4 ft 8 1/2 in (1,435 mm) standard gauge

The Ontario and Quebec Railway (O&Q) was a railway located in southern and eastern Ontario, Canada. It was initially chartered in March 1881 by managers of the Canadian Pacific Railway to run between Toronto and Perth, where it would connect, via a short branch line, to the CPR-controlled Brockville and Ottawa Railway. Construction began in 1882, and the line was completed in August 1884.

Starting in 1883, CPR began using the O&Q to build a network in southern Ontario to compete with the Grand Trunk Railway. The O&Q leased the Credit Valley Railway, Toronto Grey & Bruce, London Junction Railway and some sections of the Canada Southern Railway, building an extensive portfolio of routes. In August 1888 they provided a direct through route to Montreal by leasing the Atlantic and North-west Railway and connecting it to the O&Q via an extension from Smiths Falls to the Quebec border. A final major extension was the West Ontario Pacific Railway (WORP), which connected the Credit Valley in Woodstock to Windsor and the US border. The WOPR opened in 1887, and was immediately leased to the O&Q.

The western end of the O&Q currently forms the CPR mainline from Detroit and Windsor to Toronto, running through North Toronto and into the CPR Toronto Yard in Agincourt. The route eastward remains in limited use through Peterborough and on to Havelock where it serves several mines and quarries. However, most of the traffic between Toronto and Perth was redirected to a new CPR line running along the shoreline of Lake Ontario, the Campbellford, Lake Ontario and Western Railway. This turns northeast at Kingston to meet the O&Q at Perth, where the original O&Q forms the rest of the CPR mainline to Montreal.

The section from Glen Tay and Tweed was abandoned in 1971, and then from Tweed to Havelock in 1988. This section is now a portion of the Trans Canada Trail. The section from Toronto to Smiths Falls, now known as the Havelock Subdivision, has seen interest by VIA Rail for passenger service as their High Frequency Rail Project. The section from Perth to Quebec operates as the Winchester Subdivision, from Woodstock to London as the Galt Subdivision, and from London to Windsor as the Windsor Subdivision. The North Toronto Station, the main O&Q passenger station in Toronto, is now use as a flagship LCBO.

== History ==
The railway had received a charter in 1881, authorizing it to building a railway line between Perth and Toronto. It was effectively controlled by the Canadian Pacific Railway (CPR), as 95% of the shares issued were held by persons connected with the CPR.

Through the O&Q, the CPR created its railway network in southern and eastern Ontario:

1. it amalgamated with the Credit Valley Railway, which had also acquired a 999-year lease to a railway line from London Junction Railway.
2. CP sold to O&Q its line from Perth to Smiths Falls
3. O&Q leased from Toronto Grey & Bruce Railway for a term of 999 years its rail line running from Toronto northwest to Owen Sound and other points
4. O&Q purchased from Atlantic and North-west Railway a part of its railway system in Quebec thereby providing a connection to the province's railways
5. O&Q received authorization to amalgamate with the CVR, TG&B, A&NW or Canada Southern Railway, or acquire or lease any of their lines, in order to provide a through service between Toronto, Ottawa and Montreal
6. Parliament approved a preliminary agreement between the CPR and CVR, O&Q and A&NW to provide for the leasing of lines in order to provide for a through route between Montreal and St Thomas.

=== Lease of operations to CPR ===
The CPR formalized its association with the O&Q by obtaining a 999-year lease on it in 1884, expiring in 2883. By 1890, this lease gave the CPR an extensive network in Ontario and Quebec, with lines reaching between Quebec City and Windsor, Ontario, as well as a line running from near Ottawa to a connection with the CPR at Mattawa, Ontario.

The CPR never owned all of O&Q, a fact that caused legal problems when it attempted to sell off some O&Q real estate in Toronto that had become quite lucrative. However, the CPR won the court battle, which went to the Supreme Court of Canada.

While O&Q and the TG&B had always been operated as part of the CPR network, they were finally amalgamated to form the St. Lawrence and Hudson Railway in 1998, as a consequence of a corporate reorganization undertaken by CP.
