= Trillium Railway =

Ontario short-line railroad

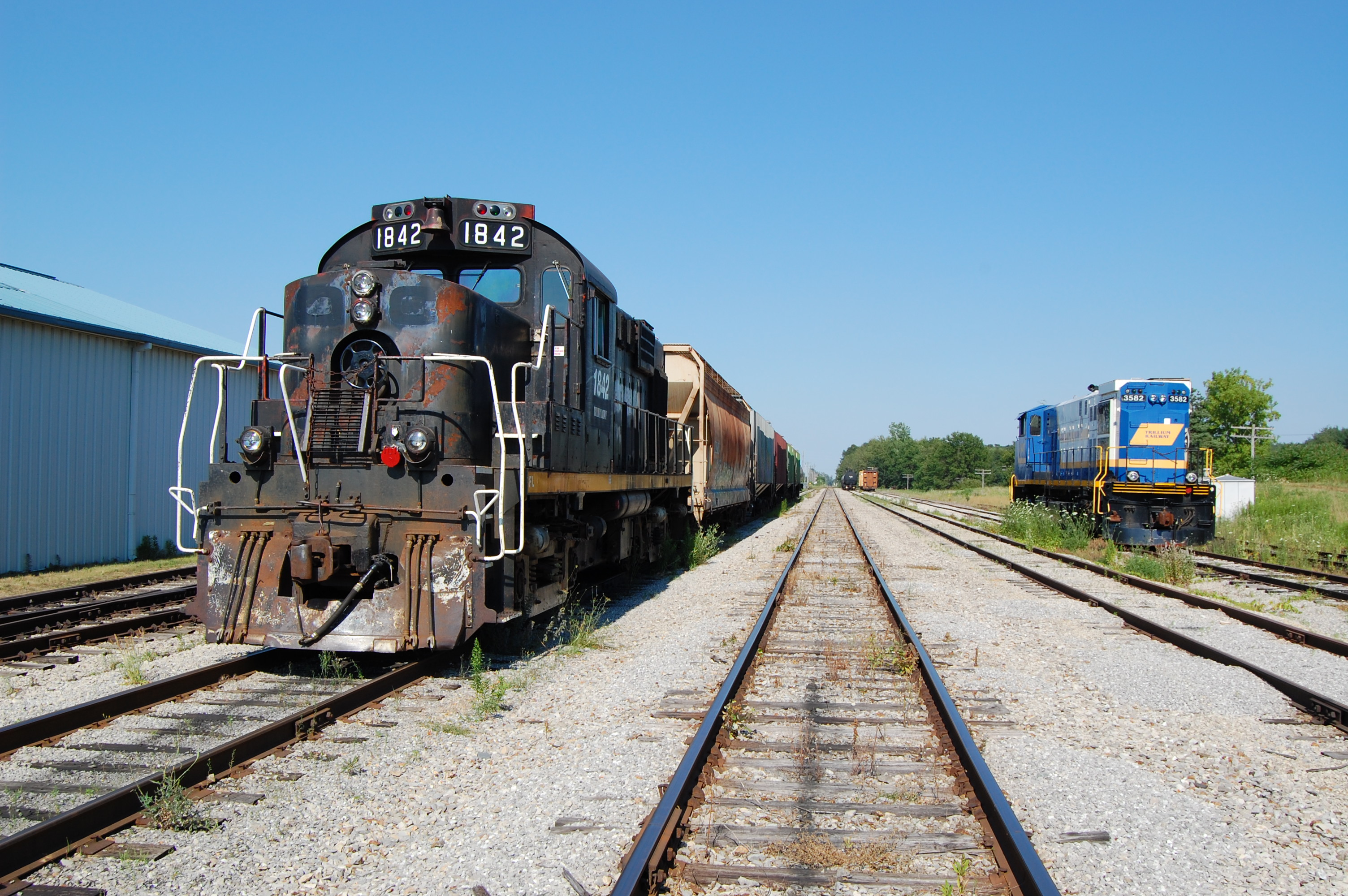
- TRRY #1842 and TRRY #3582 at Tillsonburg, Ontario

Overview
- Headquarters: Port Colborne, Ontario
- Reporting mark: TRRY
- Locale: Niagara Peninsula, Ontario, Canada
- Dates of operation: 1997–

Technical
- Track gauge: 4 ft 8 1/2 in (1,435 mm) standard gauge

The Trillium Railway (reporting mark TRRY) is a Canadian short-line railroad operating in the province of Ontario. Much of its right-of-way in the Niagara area was formerly part of the "Welland Canal Railway" (also known as the Welland Railway) that closely followed the route of the second Welland Canal.

Trillium Railway began operations in 1997 with only eleven kilometres of railway, all of which were located in Port Colborne.

With an expansion in 1998, Trillium added 55 kilometres of track between Delhi and St. Thomas. Another expansion in 1999 added another 55 kilometres of track in Welland, Thorold, and St. Catharines.

In the Niagara Region, Trillium's trackage, referred to as Port Colborne Harbour Railway, is made up of Canadian National's former secondary and branch lines, including a number of urban spurs, on the west side of the Canal. CN and Canadian Pacific interchange with Trillium at CN/CP Feeder. Trillium no longer operates on the south tracks of the Townline Tunnel under the Welland Canal.

From July 2018 until the line's closure in December 2021, Trillium operated the Orangeville Brampton Railway under contract from the Town of Orangeville, taking over operations from Cando Rail Services Ltd. The train was discontinued in 2019

In 2018 Trillium Railway was purchased by Gio Rail.

== Closed subdivision ==
The St. Thomas and Eastern Railway operated over the former CN Cayuga Spur, the historical "Canada Air Line". It reached the city of St. Thomas via trackage rights over CN.
