= Toronto, Grey and Bruce Railway =

Former railway in Ontario, Canada

Overview
- Headquarters: Toronto
- Reporting mark: TG&BR
- Locale: Southern Ontario, Canada
- Dates of operation: 1868–1883
- Successors: Ontario and Quebec Railway; Canadian Pacific Railway; Orangeville-Brampton Railway

Technical
- Track gauge: 4 ft 8 1/2 in (1,435 mm) standard gauge from 1881
- Previous gauge: 3 ft 6 in (1,067 mm) until 1881

The Toronto, Grey and Bruce Railway (TG&B) was a railway company which operated in Ontario, Canada in the years immediately following the Canadian Confederation of 1867. It connected two rural counties, Grey County and Bruce County, with the provincial capital of Toronto to the east.

The TG&B suffered from engineering and financial problems throughout its existence, and its struggle to finance a gauge conversion from narrow to standard gauge led to a takeover by bondholders and subsequent acquisition by the Canadian Pacific Railway through its proxy, the Ontario and Quebec Railway. The bulk of the former TG&B lines were managed under Canadian Pacific's Bruce Division, which had its divisional point at Orangeville, the junction of the original TG&B lines to Owen Sound and Teeswater.

== Background ==
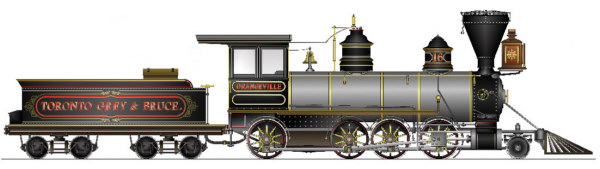
Toronto, Grey and Bruce Railway, Baldwin Locomotive Company 2-8-0, No. 16 Orangeville 1874

Early development of railways in the Province of Canada, which consisted of Lower Canada (Quebec) and Upper Canada (Ontario), was delayed by lack of capital and industrial infrastructure. The first major national railway development was the construction of the Grand Trunk Railway of Canada on a gauge of 5 ft 6 in (1,676 mm) from Portland, Maine to Sarnia, Canada West via Montreal and Toronto, with a branch from Richmond to Levis, near Quebec City.

Investment funds for railways were scarce in the Dominion of Canada because the economy was mainly agricultural, and most capital was tied up in land. The line was constructed by the English contractors Peto, Brassey and Betts, who undertook to raise the capital required in London if they obtained the contract. As a result of the exorbitant cost of land and charters, overbuilding stone bridges and stations to English standards, and initial lack of traffic to support the capital cost, the line was soon insolvent. This failure together with a severe recession, and the US Civil War meant that no more capital could be raised, and almost no railways were built in Canada during the 1860s.

There was a return of confidence with the Confederation of the British North American colonies into Canada in 1867, and the political promise of a transcontinental railway to the Pacific. Merchants, industrialists, and politicians of Toronto, Ontario and surrounding counties began to look for ways of opening up the back country 'bush' north of the city to settlement and trade. Lakes and rivers had been the principal means of transportation but they were frozen and unusable for 4–5 months of the year.

Road construction was primitive, and trees were cut down and laid side by side in swamps to form 'corduroy' roads. Most roads were passable in winter (hard frozen) and summer (hard baked) but impassable mud troughs in spring and fall. The government struggled to find a way to provide essential railway service inexpensively through wild, unsettled territory.

== Choice of narrow gauge, promotion, and financing ==
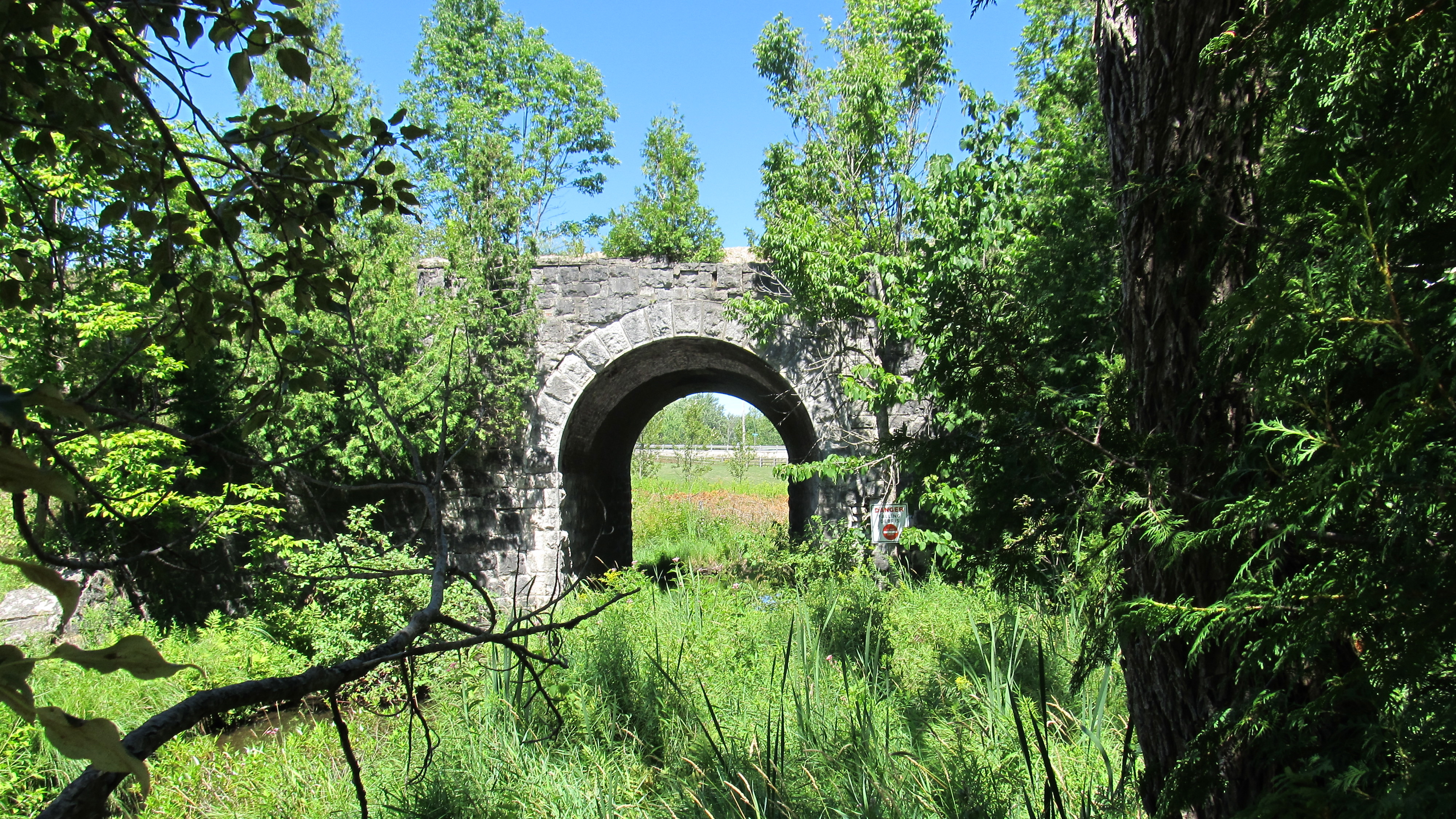
Old bridge on Toronto, Grey and Bruce Railway located in Chatsworth just south of Owen Sound, Ontario

A charismatic Scots-born Toronto wharfinger and trader, George Laidlaw took up the challenge. He was a business associate of the powerful Gooderham and Worts Distillery interests, and other Toronto bankers and merchants. Laidlaw advertised in newspapers in London, England, for suggestions as to how railways might be built more cheaply in Canada. He received a reply from Carl Abraham Pihl, first managing engineer of Norway's Railway Construction Bureau. Pihl had worked on the construction, under Robert Stephenson, of the first Norwegian trunk railway the Hovedbanen from Christiania (today Oslo) to Eidsvoll, which opened in 1854 where the same issues of overbuilding a line in a small farming and fishing economy, had led to an unaffordable railway.

He now advocated the use of the narrow gauge of 3 ft 6 in (1,067 mm) with all major construction in wood, which system he had developed since the early 1860s. Pihl's ideas had been noticed in Britain where the smaller Ffestiniog Railway in Wales was also proving a success. After a visit to Norway the 3 ft 6 in (1,067 mm) gauge was taken up by Sir Charles Fox and Sons, the firm founded by the eminent engineer and constructor of the Crystal Palace at the Great Exhibition of 1851. Fox had a very influential consulting practice throughout the former British Empire and Colonies and was instrumental in gaining acceptance for the 3 ft 6 in (1,067 mm) gauge in Canada, New Zealand, Australia and South Africa.

The choice of the narrow gauge led to vigorous challenges in London, England and Canada. Zerah Colburn, the editor of the London technical journal Engineering, used its columns to violently criticise the advice of Douglas Fox, the elder son of Sir Charles Fox, to the promoters, which was taken up by the Hamilton, Ontario Spectator which supported that town's claim to be the hub (rather than Toronto) of railway traffic for western Ontario.

Abraham Fitzgibbon, the chief engineer of the Queensland Railways, came to the aid of the promoters with a speech in Toronto. The main opposition to the narrow gauge came from the Wellington, Grey and Bruce Railway in the west and the Port Whitby and Port Perry Railway in the east. Both lines were proposing to build competing lines on the 5 ft 6 in (1,676 mm) "Provincial" gauge and claimed that the choice of the narrow gauge was a ruse to ensure that all the traffic of the districts would be exclusively trans-shipped at Toronto, rather than Hamilton and Whitby, Ontario. The opposition narrowly failed to defeat the narrow gauge, and Provincial Charters were granted to the Toronto and Nipissing Railway, and the Toronto, Grey and Bruce Railway, on March 4, 1868.

George Laidlaw sought to raise money to finance the construction of the narrow-gauge railways by the following means, in order of preference:

- Bonuses approved by vote of taxpayers from each township and county on the route of the line
- Provincial government grants per mile of track built, under the "Aid to Railways Act"
- Sale of Stock
- Sale of Bonds
- Loans

Laidlaw and other directors fanned out through the townships speaking at taxpayer meetings in support of bonuses for the railways. His messianic style at these meetings often generated so much enthusiasm that motions were immediately approved to grant large sums in support of the lines. On the morrow the local politicians often had second and more sober thoughts and sought to control the process themselves, trying to dictate where and when the money would be spent, and on what.

Long campaigns ensued with businessmen and progressive farmers whose lots would be near the line advocating large unconditional grants and those in more distant locations opposing the free bonuses of tax money. Generally, the response of the settlers, anxious to expand opportunities for trade and travel, was generous. However, when strongly opposed, Laidlaw's combative and insulting responses could generate such opposition that townships delayed contributing money for years or refused entirely.

By late 1874, when the TG&BR was open to Owen Sound and almost complete to Teeswater, the approximate total of the capital account, excluding minor receipts and expenses, since the start of construction in 1869, was:

Receipts ($)

- Municipal Bonuses 869,000
- Government Grants 232,000
- Calls on Stock 271,000
- Sale of Bonds 1,201,000

Total Receipts 2,573,000

Expenditures ($)

- Engineering 206,000
- Right of Way 47,000
- Construction 1,649,000
- Iron and Fastenings 368,000
- Rolling Stock 392,000

Total Expenditures 2,562,000

Contrary to the hopes of the promoters, the proceeds from bonuses, grants, and stock sales fell short of paying for construction of the roadbed and structures by over $400,000. This deficit and the cost of purchasing iron and equipment had to be made up by issuing bonds whose guaranteed interest payments were a heavy burden on the income of the TG&BR and ultimately were to prove fatal to its prospects.

The Act empowering the Toronto, Grey and Bruce specified that the railway should extend from Toronto via Orangeville, to Mount Forest and Durham, where it would split into a northerly branch to Southampton and a southerly one to Kincardine. Another branch north to Owen Sound was to commence at Mount Forest or Durham. A line from Toronto first had to get to the Humber Valley at Weston by means of a third rail in the 5 ft 6in gauge track of the Grand Trunk Railway, proceed up the Humber Valley to Bolton, Ontario and then traverse the Caledon Mountain to gain Orangeville via the Credit Valley. The line would then go west to Arthur, and then north to Mount Forest.

On the lower part of the line, as far as Orangeville, municipal bonuses were generally given freely and generously, but beyond that place Garafraxa and Luther townships did not contribute towards the 15 miles of the line along their township borders. At first blocked from reaching Owen Sound via Durham, the TG&BR eventually soundly trounced the Wellington, Grey and Bruce Railway in bonus elections in Grey County, and reached Owen Sound via Shelburne and Dundalk, Ontario. The TG&BR lost most of its battles with the WG&BR in Bruce County. Eventually it abandoned any hope of reaching Kincardine and settled for a western terminus at Teeswater.

== Engineering ==
The Toronto, Grey and Bruce and the Toronto and Nipissing Railways were promoted at the same time and with similar objectives by an interlocking group of Ontario businessmen and politicians. It is not surprising that the group saved by employing one chief engineer to apply the same design principles and choices on both lines. The first consulting engineer in Canada was John Edward Boyd of New Brunswick, who conducted the preliminary surveys over the ground to Orangeville and Uxbridge.

Douglas Fox came to Canada several times in 1868 and 1869 to support the parliamentary campaign and verify the surveys. On his return to England in summer of 1869, he made arrangements for an associate, Edmund Wragge, to come to Canada at once to take up the engineering of both lines. In August Wragge visited Pihl in Norway to see his narrow gauge lines and arrived in Toronto in September 1869. The tenders for the first sections of line were immediately put out.

The engineering of the TG&BR was of the more substantial nature on the two lines; including three major bridges at the crossing of the Humber River, the Grand River, and the Saugeen River at Mount Forest; and the ascent of the Niagara Escarpment (Caledon Mountain) between Mono Road and Charleston (now Caledon village) which involved a "horseshoe" reverse curve of 500 ft (152 m) radius and a gradient of 2% or 1:50.

The line leaving Toronto Union Station through Parkdale from 1873 to 1879 offered the unusual coincidence of parallel running with the 5 ft 6 in (1,676 mm)-gauge Northern Railway of Canada and two 1,435 mm (4 ft 8 1/2 in) (standard-gauge) rail lines. Wragge appointed Alan McDougall as his first resident engineer on the TG&BR. Later one of the resident engineers was Charles Sproatt of Toronto, who later became Toronto City Engineer. Edmund Wragge remained Chief Engineer of the Toronto, Grey and Bruce Railway until its absorption into the CPR.

== Construction ==
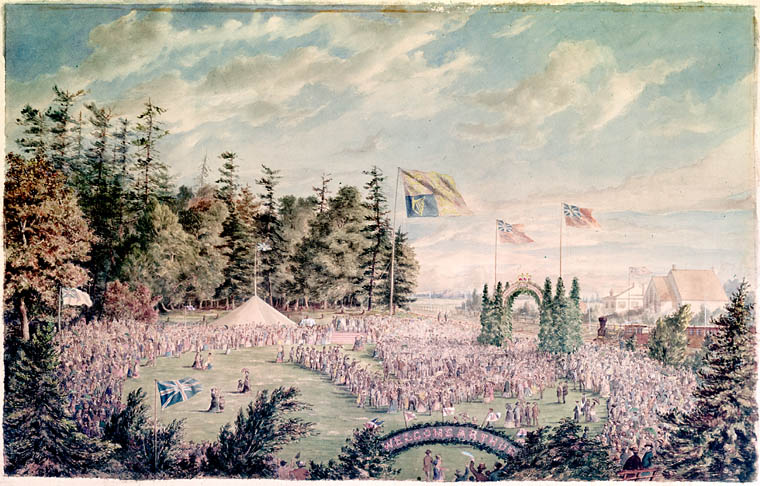
Prince Arthur, Duke of Connaught and Strathearn arriving for the ceremony of turning the first sod of the Toronto, Grey and Bruce Railway, in Weston, Ontario, in 1869.

The successful contract bidder on the first section of the Toronto, Grey and Bruce Railway as far as Mount Forest was Frank Shanly. The line was opened to Orangeville in September and to Mount Forest in December 1871.

The contract for the Grey Extension from Orangeville Junction to Owen Sound was split between Frank Shanly (Orangeville Junction to Berkeley), and William Innes McKenzie (Owen Sound to Berkeley), completed in August 1873. Shanly completed this work satisfactorily but subsequently encountered financial difficulties with a Midland Railway of Canada contract, and the work on the Bruce Extension from Mount Forest to Harriston was awarded solely to McKenzie. After the death of his partner, John Shedden, William Innes McKenzie himself became insolvent and the line from Harriston to Teeswater was completed in November 1874 by small contractors from Mount Forest.

== Locomotives ==
The first locomotives on the TG&BR were a 4-6-0 and some smaller 4-4-0s ordered from the Avonside Engine Company by George Laidlaw, and John Gordon during a visit to England in the Spring of 1869. This was before the appointment of Edmund Wragge as Chief Engineer, and it is likely that they were advised to order them by Douglas Fox based on his similar recommendations for the Queensland Railways. In 1872 a Fairlie 0-6-6-0 was received from Avonside together with another, larger, 4-6-0. Then followed two small 2-6-0s from the Baldwin Locomotive Works. The final order to Avonside was for three small and one large 4-6-0. late delivery of these engines from England in 1873 was responsible in large part for the locomotive order going to Baldwin for six 2-8-0s delivered in 1874. The most successful of all these locomotives, judged by their utilisation, were the Avonside 4-6-0s. One of the 4-4-0s and several of the 4-6-0s and 2-8-0s continued in 4 ft 8 1/2 in (1,435 mm) standard-gauge service with the Canadian Pacific Railway (CPR).

Some details of these TG&BR locomotives have long been confused in early historical reviews, and the errors repeated in subsequent publications. Reference to the original company records held by Library and Archives Canada, the published Annual Reports of the Company, the Avonside Engine Company records held at the Leeds Industrial Museum (UK), and the Baldwin Order books in the DeGolyer Library of Southern Methodist University have established the correct numbering and data cited below:

Number	Name	Builder	Type	Date	Works number	CPR number	Notes
1	Gordon	Avonside Engine Company	4-6-0	Aug 1870	799		scrapped after 1883
2	A.R. McMaster	Avonside Engine Company	4-4-0	Aug 1870	800		scrapped after 1883
3	Kincardine	Avonside Engine Company	4-4-0	September 1870	809		scrapped after 1883
4	R. Walker & Sons	Avonside Engine Company	4-4-0	May 1871	838		scrapped after 1883
5	Albion	Avonside Engine Company	4-4-0	July 1871	839		scrapped after 1883
6	Rice Lewis & Son	Avonside Engine Company	4-4-0	Mid 1871	840	156	In CPR service on construction of the Lake Superior section as CPR No.156 (Avonside engine coupled to a tender from one of the TG&BR Baldwin Moguls). Later sold to the Pontiac and Renfrew Railway.
7	Caledon	Avonside Engine Company	0-6-6-0 Fairlie type	Late 1872	862 & 863		scrapped after 1883
8	Mono	Avonside Engine Company	4-6-0	Late 1871	866	159	
9	Toronto	Baldwin Locomotive Works	2-6-0	September 1871	2534		sold to Philadelphia and Atlantic City Railroad
10	Amaranth	Baldwin Locomotive Works	2-6-0	September 1871	2538		sold to Suffolk Lumber Company
11	Holland	Avonside Engine Company	4-6-0	Early 1873	one of 935-939	160	
12	Sydenham	Avonside Engine Company	4-6-0	Early 1873	one of 935-939	161	
13	Artemisia	Avonside Engine Company	4-6-0	Early 1873	one of 935-939	162	
14	Owen Sound	Avonside Engine Company	4-6-0	Early 1873	one of 931, 932, 933, or 934	163	
15	Mount Forest	Baldwin Locomotive Works	2-8-0	February 1874	3524	164	
16	Orangeville	Baldwin Locomotive Works	2-8-0	February 1874	3525	165	
17	Sarawak	Baldwin Locomotive Works	2-8-0	April 1874	3551	166	
18	Melancthon	Baldwin Locomotive Works	2-8-0	April 1874	3552	167	
19	Howick	Baldwin Locomotive Works	2-8-0	September 1874	3636	168	
20	Culross	Baldwin Locomotive Works	2-8-0	September 1874	3640	169	

== Rolling stock ==
Based partly on contemporary British railway practice, the experience of Sir Charles Fox and Sons on the Queensland Railways, and Carl Abraham Pihl's work in Norway, the early rolling stock was intended to consist of short four-wheel boxcars, and longer six-wheel flat and passenger cars using Clark's radial axle arrangement. The four-wheel boxcars were reliable and suited the traffic at first but became too small for the increasing traffic and were not added to after 1874. Many became wayside grounded tool vans after gauge standardisation.

The first longer flatcars were built using imported sets of Clark's radial gear and put into service with the construction contractors. The intention was that they would go more easily around tight curves. Whether through bad design, poor assembly, or abuse and heavy uneven loading by the construction gangs, the six-wheel cars proved disastrously prone to derailment and were soon put aside in favour of cars re-equipped with two standard North American four-wheel trucks (bogies). The passenger cars were never used in six-wheel form due to safety concerns.

Most of the early TG&BR freight and passenger cars were built by Dickey, Neill and Company at the Beverley Street Foundry, Toronto. The Company was a substantial investor in the TG&BR. The first passenger cars were notable in having a compound curved roof with a high centre section, giving extra headroom over the centre gangway; an arrangement often seen on horse-drawn streetcars of the period. Some later freight cars were built by the James Crossen Works, of Cobourg. Four larger and more luxurious passenger cars were obtained in 1874 from Jackson and Sharp of Wilmington, Delaware.

In the mid-1870s, the TG&BR owned 18 cars in passenger and mail service, and 466 freight cars of all types.

== Operation ==
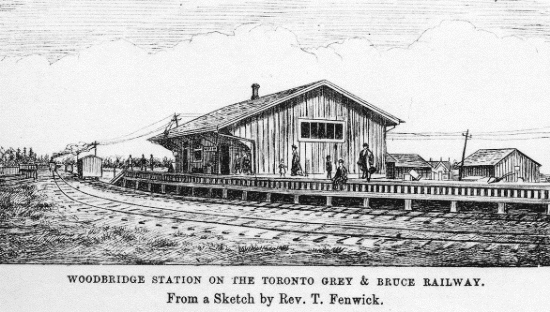
Woodbridge station along the TG&B, circa 1880.

Passenger and freight traffic on the Toronto, Grey and Bruce Railway grew strongly at first, challenging the ability of the line to carry all that was offered. The TG&BR directors reacted tardily, causing many complaints about the backlogs of traffic. Eventually they did buy substantial numbers of new locomotives and freight cars, just in time to suffer the devastating effects of poor grain harvests and the business recession of the mid-late 1870s. This weighed heavily on the line's ability to pay a return on the capital invested, and the TG&BR entered a period of constant insolvency, and recurrent efforts to re-structure the debt.

Lumber and firewood gradually declined and was not compensated for by the expected increase in agricultural produce. Operating ratios (costs/receipts) were worse than the T&NR, but not substantially different from those of other small Ontario railways of the period. They were substantially worse than those of large railways such as the GTR and CPR. The gross TG&BR profit was barely equivalent to 4-5% on its outstanding bonds, which had been sold with a guaranteed return of 7-8%. This left nothing for renewals of equipment and trackage or for the stockholders. The Grey extension to Owen Sound carried a vigorous traffic in passengers and freight, for onward carriage to the Lakehead by steamers. The Bruce extension to Teeswater was very sparsely used in the 1870s and there were continuous efforts to devise an economic passenger service to suit the circumstances.

The typical passenger service consisted of two trains per day each way between Owen Sound and Toronto; there was only one return trip each day from Teeswater to Orangeville. Orangeville had three trains a day to and from Toronto. Freight traffic over the Caledon Hills and the heights near Dundalk required powerful 4-6-0 and 2-8-0 locomotives, which seem to have handled the traffic comfortably, although trains often had to be divided between Mono Road and Charleston (Caledon). The small narrow-gauge engines were able to cope with normal winter weather, but there were major blockages of the line in the 'snowbelt' country above Orangeville, which sometimes closed the line for several weeks. The TG&BR was sometimes unable, for many months, to pay the overtime wages for manually clearing these drifts. There were few public accidents, but a severe toll of industrial fatalities to the operating staff.

The most dangerous job was brakesman, with many young men being crippled or killed when walking along the tops of vehicles to manually screw down brakes and when manually coupling cars using the highly dangerous link-and-pin couplers. The worst incident on the TG&BR occurred at Arthur when a passenger was killed by shots fired at a train crew by drunken members of the Orange Order on July 12, 1872.

== Change of gauge and absorption by the Canadian Pacific Railway ==
The poor financial returns on investment of all small Ontario railways in the late 1870s caused severe discontent among the bondholders. Many charged that the TG&BR's troubles were due to the narrow gauge which made freight haulage uneconomical. From 1877, there were many calls for converting the gauge to 4 ft 8 1/2 in (1,435 mm) standard gauge, but in fact, the line had no lack of capacity. The real issue was overcapacity during a protracted traffic slump.

In any case, no one would volunteer the capital to convert the gauge. Eventually, there were warnings that the line was becoming unsafe by the deterioration of wooden trestles and iron rails and would soon have to close. The bondholders lost patience and seized the line. They approached the Grand Trunk Railway, which obtained control of the TG&BR and financed the renewals and gauge conversion in late 1881. Unfortunately, the GTR encountered its own financial problems in digesting the Great Western Railway and had to cede control to the Ontario and Quebec Railway, a proxy for the Canadian Pacific Railway, on August 1, 1883.

== See also ==
- Narrow-gauge railways in Canada
- Toronto and Nipissing Railway
- List of Ontario railways
- Rail transport in Ontario
- History of rail transport in Canada
- List of defunct Canadian railways
