= Erie and Ontario Railway =

Defunct railroad in Canada

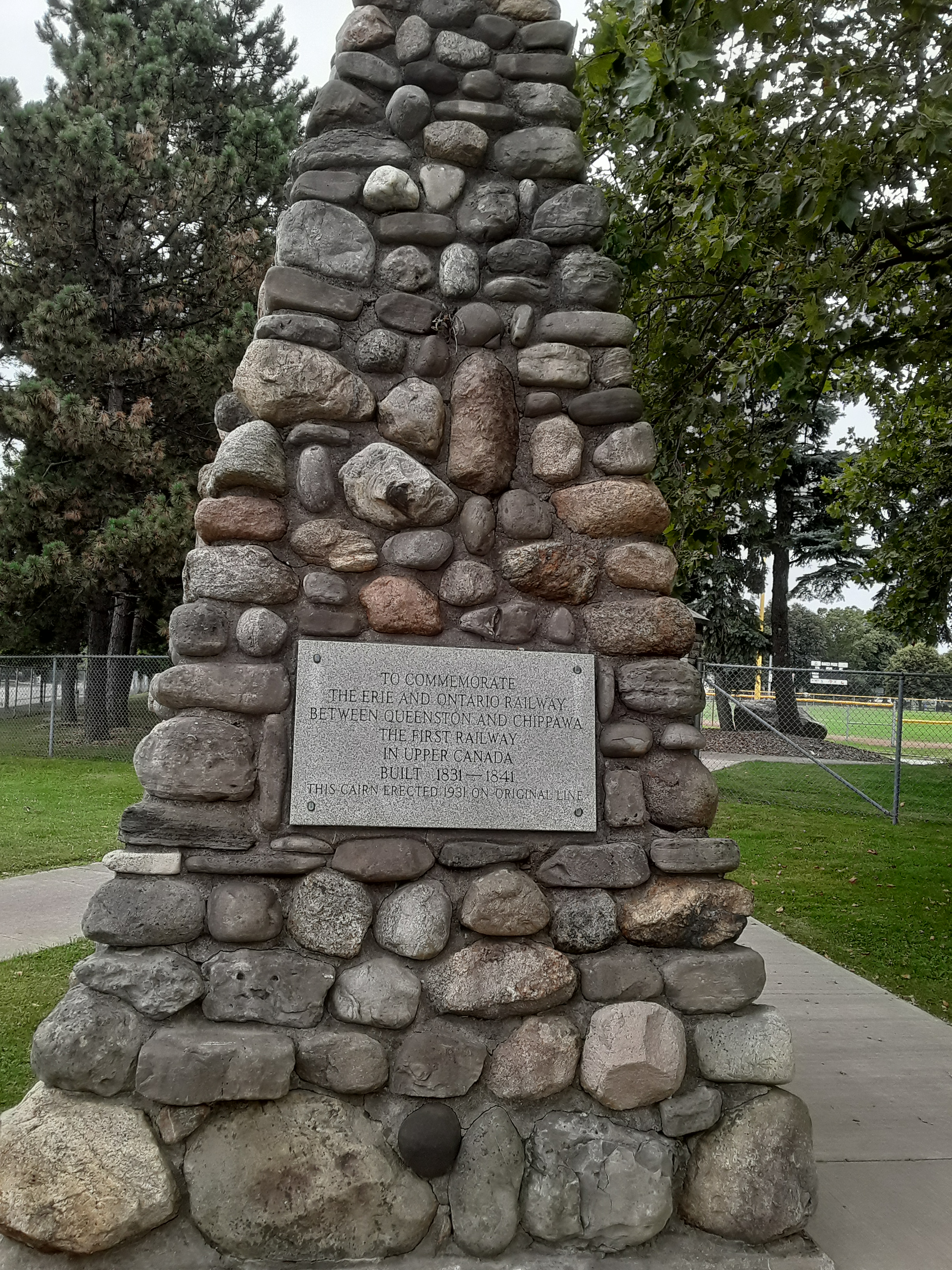
- A cairn commemorating the former railroad.

Overview
- Dates of operation: 1831–1889
- Successor: Canada Southern Railway

The Erie and Ontario Railway was a railroad in Canada built between 1831 and 1841 to connect the towns of Queenston and Chippawa, Ontario. It was initially built as a horse-drawn railroad with wooden rails, and a gauge of 5 ft 6 in. Established in 1831, the company constructed the first railroad in Ontario.

== History ==
Founded in 1831, the railroad's charter was modified by the Ontario government in 1852, authorizing it to expand to the Niagara River, construct branch lines, and connect to other railroads. Following this change to its charter, and the company's purchase by businessman Samuel Zimmerman, steam power replaced horses in 1854. Rebuilt to accommodate the much more powerful (and much heavier) steam engines, the line was extended to Niagara-on-the-Lake that year as well, with the new line bypassing Queenston. The railroad ran its first train between Chippawa and Niagara-on-the-Lake on June 28, 1854.

In 1863, the railroad was purchased by William Alexander Thomson, owner of the Fort Erie Railway Company which had recently begun operations nearby. Upon purchasing the Erie and Ontario, Thomson renamed it to the Erie and Niagara Railway.

In 1878, the Canada Southern Railway purchased the Erie and Niagara. The railroad ceased to be its own company when it was formally absorbed by the Canada Southern in 1889.

Passenger service along the railroad line ended around 1925. The railroad line was formally abandoned in 1959.
