= St. Lawrence and Hudson Railway =

Subsidiary of Canadian Pacific Railway

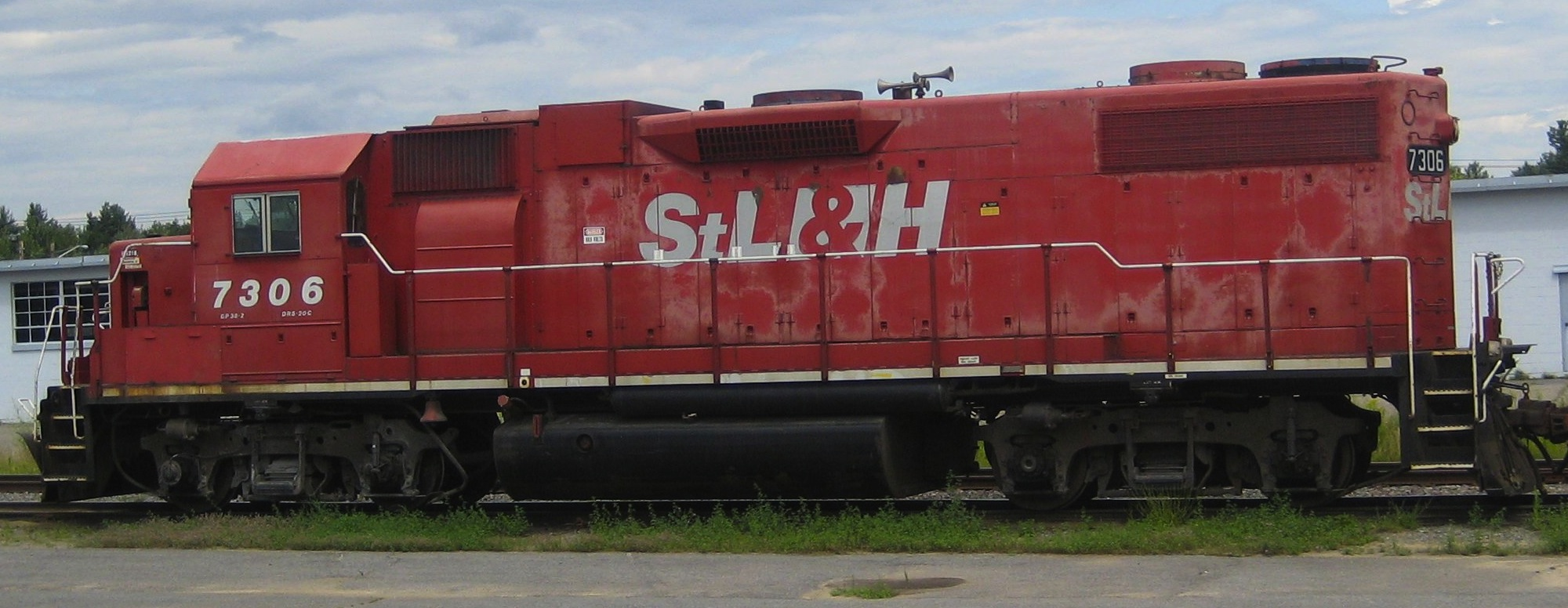
- StL&H EMD GP38-2 #7306 at Plattsburgh Air Force Base in 2009.

Overview
- Headquarters: Montreal, QC
- Reporting mark: STLH
- Locale: St. Lawrence River valley (Quebec City - Chicago), Hudson River valley (Montreal - Washington, D.C.)
- Dates of operation: October 1, 1996–January 1, 2001
- Successor: Canadian Pacific Railway

Technical
- Track gauge: 4 ft 8 1/2 in (1,435 mm) standard gauge

The St. Lawrence and Hudson Railway (reporting mark STLH) was a wholly owned subsidiary of the Canadian Pacific Railway.

The StL&H arose out of a corporate reorganization at CPR that was announced on November 21, 1995. CPR wished to spin off its "eastern operating unit" into an operating railway company as a means to control poor financial performance of its assets in eastern North America.

A new management group responsible for the company's operations in the east, including the Delaware & Hudson Railway, will be headquartered in Montreal. The eastern unit will be responsible for turning the railway's operations between Montreal to Chicago and the U.S. Northeast into the most efficient, low-cost provider of railway services in the region. The new eastern unit will allow the railway to aggressively address the persistent losses it has sustained on its operations in the region. Its creation follows earlier efforts to merge with CN in the east and to acquire CN's eastern operations. The new unit will have autonomy to determine its own equipment requirements, network rationalization and labour relationships.

— Canadian Pacific Railway, November 21, 1995, http://www.trainweb.org/galt-stn/stlh.htm

The new wholly owned subsidiary was named the St. Lawrence & Hudson Railway Company Limited and became operational on October 1, 1996, taking control of all CPR assets from Quebec City to Chicago (CPR trackage and trackage rights), and from Montreal to Washington, D.C. (Delaware and Hudson Railway), thus the D&H became a StL&H subsidiary.

The company name reflected its geographic region of operations - the St. Lawrence River valley and the Hudson River valley.

The StL&H was given a dedicated management team and the authorization to undertake radical measures to reverse financial losses. Within one year the financial picture was reversed and CPR announced its intention to continue ownership of the SL&H assets.

On January 1, 2001, the StL&H assets were transferred back to CPR ownership and the StL&H was dissolved. The D&H, being the CPR's corporate face in the northeastern United States, remained legally intact.

== See also ==
- List of defunct Canadian railways
