= St. Thomas and Eastern Railway =

Railway in Ontario, Canada

Saint Thomas and Eastern Railway

Overview
- Headquarters: Wainfleet, Ontario
- Reporting mark: TRRY
- Locale: St. Thomas, Ontario
- Dates of operation: 1998–2013

Technical
- Track gauge: 4 ft 8 1/2 in (1,435 mm) standard gauge

The St. Thomas and Eastern Railway (reporting mark TRRY) was a shortline railway division of the Trillium Railway, operating near St. Thomas, Ontario, Canada. The main commodities transported on the railway were grain, salt, and chemicals. St. Thomas and Eastern connected to Canadian National at Sarum, east of St Thomas, and Ontario Southland Railway (OSRX) in Tillsonburg. Total trackage was 33.6 miles. Trillium Railway ceased operations of the STER on December 20, 2013.
