= Hamilton Radial Electric Railway =

Former railway in Ontario, Canada

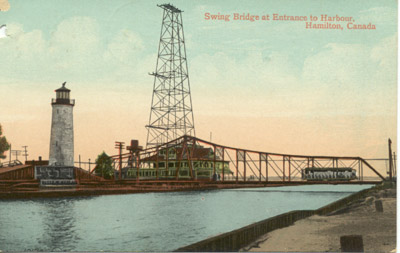
- A Hamilton Radial Electric Railway vehicle crosses the Hamilton Harbour swing bridge in 1907.

Overview
- Parent company: Dominion Power and Transmission Company
- Headquarters: Hamilton, Ontario
- Locale: Southern Ontario
- Dates of operation: 7 September 1896–5 January 1929

Technical
- Track gauge: 4 ft 8 1/2 in (1,435 mm) standard gauge
- Electrification: 600 V overhead

The Hamilton Radial Electric Railway (HRER) was an interurban electric railway which at its maximum extent operated between Hamilton and Oakville in Ontario, Canada.

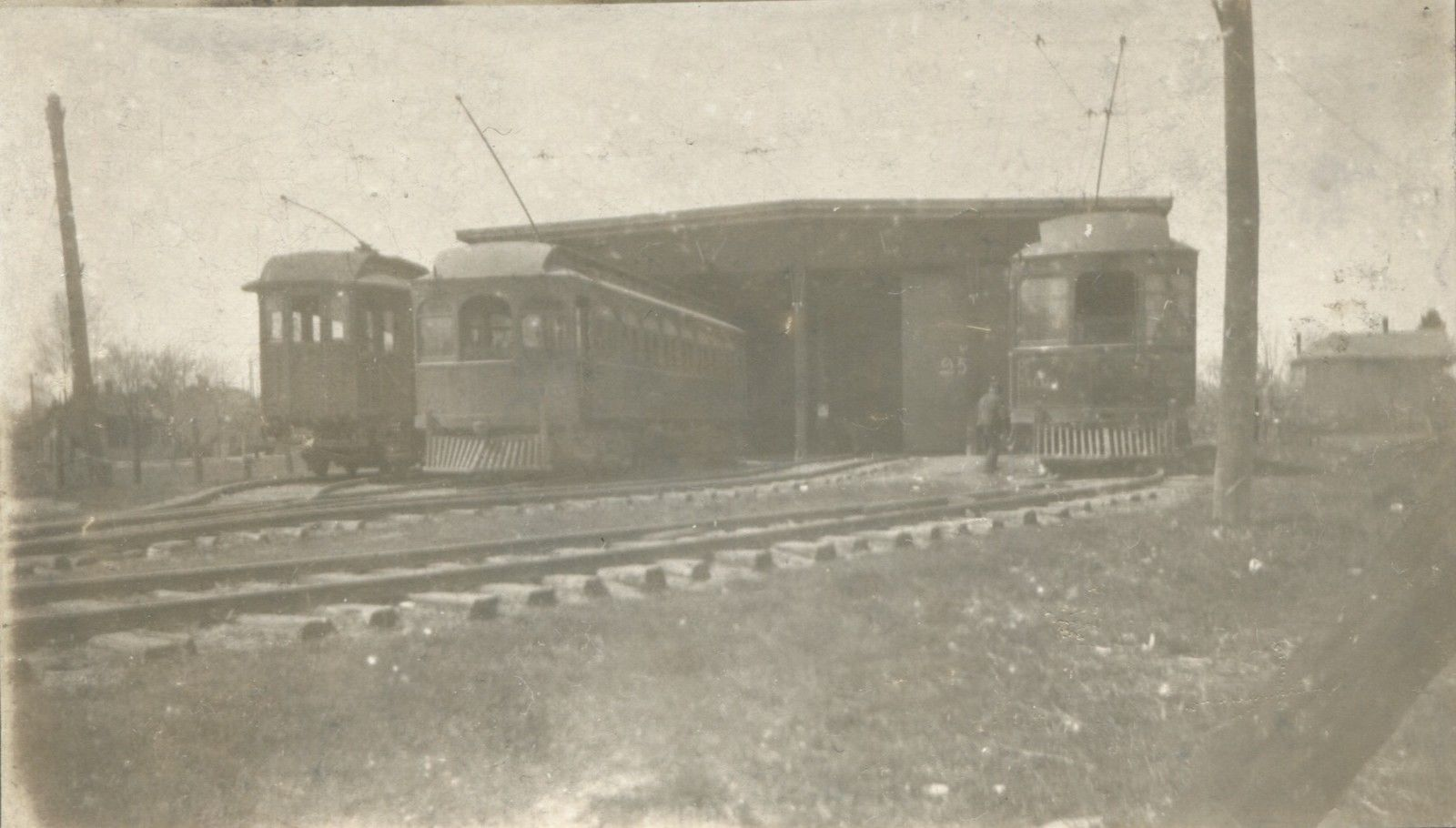
HRER carhouse along James Street, Burlington

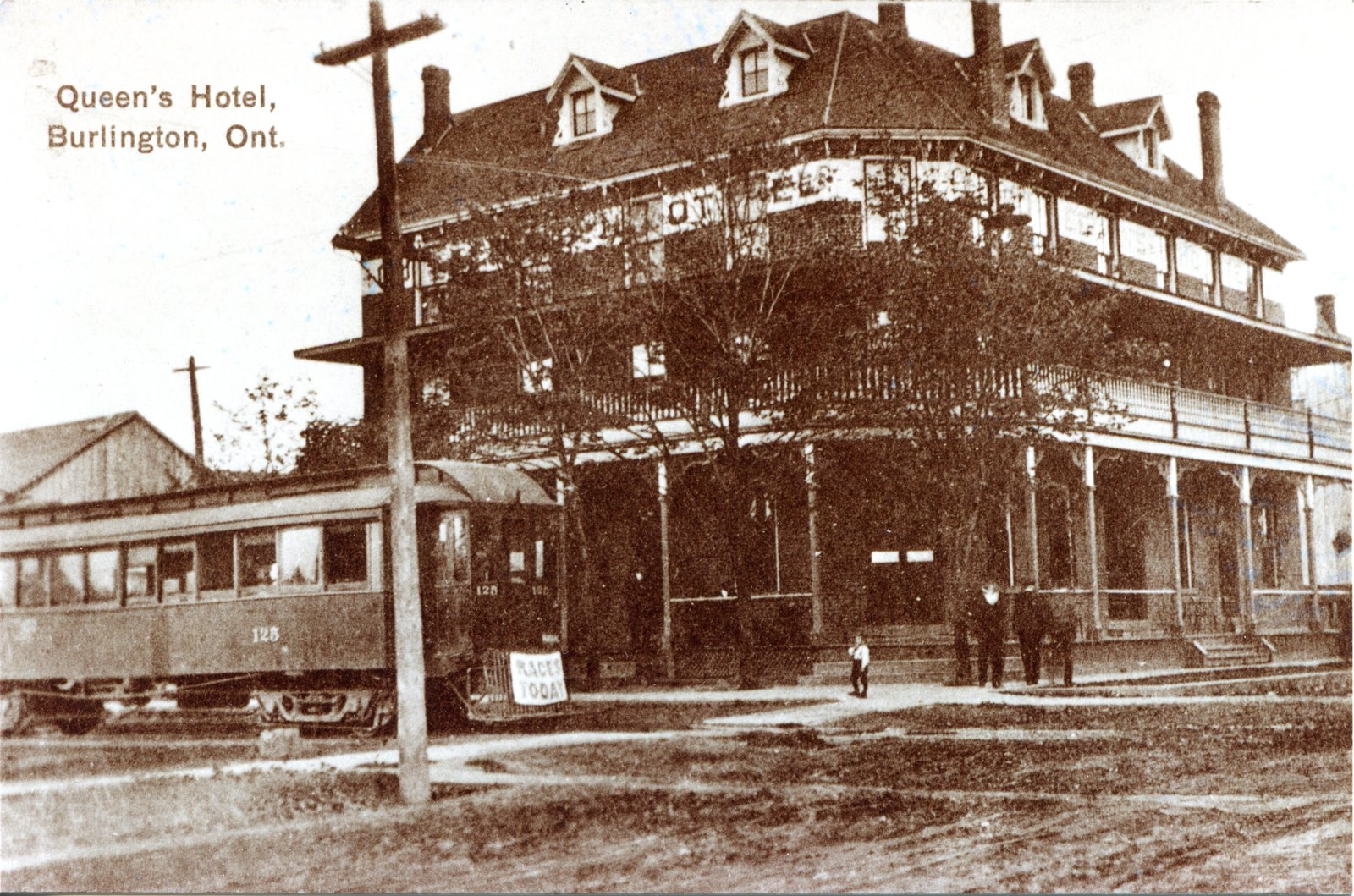
HRER 125 beside the Queen's Hotel at Elgin and John Streets, Burlington, circa 1905

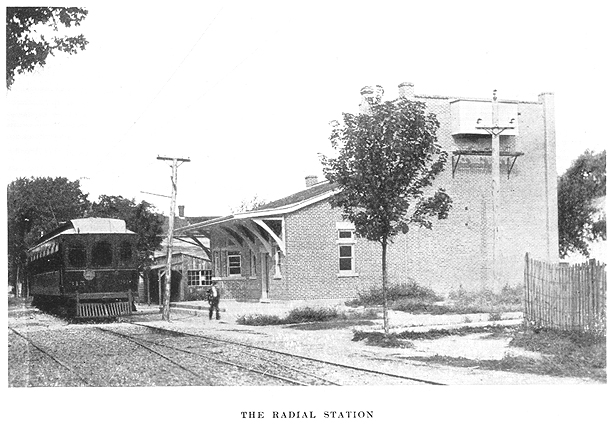
HRER's Oakville Station at Randall and Thomas Streets

== Route ==
Between March 3, 1906, and August 3, 1925, the Hamilton Radial Electric Railway was at its maximum length of 34.6 kilometres (21.5 mi), extending from Hamilton Terminal Station to Randall Street in Oakville.

From Hamilton Terminal at King and Catherine Streets, the line went via street trackage east along King Street East, north on Sanford Street and east on Wilson Street to Birch Avenue. On a private right-of-way, the line continued north on Birch Avenue and west Burlington Street to Kennilworth Avenue. At this point, the HRER left the tracks it shared with the Hamilton Street Railway.

After crossing Kennilworth Avenue, the HRER curved north on a double-track private right-of-way to cross the isthmus that separates Hamilton Harbour from Lake Ontario. The Burlington Canal Bridge crosses its namesake canal which splits the isthmus into two sections: Hamilton Beach south of the canal and Burlington Beach to its north. In Hamilton Beach, the HRER line ran along the east side of what is today Beach Boulevard. The double track ended at the canal bridge, where a single track line crossed the road/rail bridge and continued into Burlington Beach, where at its northern, the line passed the HRER powerhouse. A Grand Trunk Railway line also crossed the isthmus parallel to the HRER line but closer to the beach, crossing the canal on its own bridge.

Leaving Burlington Beach, the HRER passed the Brant Hotel on the site of today's Joseph Brant Memorial Hospital. Leaving the private right-of-way, the line passed through various streets in Burlington. It went north along Maple Avenue, east along Elgin Street crossing the GTR line west of Brant Street. At Elgin and John Streets, there were a passenger station and a freight station. There was a branch line for freight trains running south on John Street. Passenger trains turned north on John Street then east on James Street, and further east along New Street to the community of Port Nelson (near today's Guelph Line). After passing Port Nelson, the line followed the north side of New Street, and at Bronte switched to the south side of Rebecca Street.{rp|50–51} Continuing further east, the line crossed Sixteen Mile Creek on a high bridge, and entered Randall Street where Oakville station was located at Thomas Street.

There was hourly service between Hamilton and Oakville. The scheduled trip durations from Hamilton were 35 minutes to the canal on the beach strip, 40 minutes to Burlington and 70 minutes to Oakville.

== Freight ==
The HRER had carload freight operations along Hamilton Harbour and to a lesser extent in Burlington, where there was a branch line south on John Street serving two canneries. The HRER interchanged carload freight with the GTR in Hamilton and Burlington. It also handled express and package freight. The City of Hamilton would not permit the HRER to run freight cars along Sanford Avenue and King Street; combines with passenger seating were permitted on these streets but express cars for freight only were not.

== History ==
The Hamilton Radial Electric Railway received its provincial charter on March 24, 1893. Construction started on March 27, 1896. In August, 1896 two carhouses were built, one at Gore & Mary Streets in Hamilton, and a second on Burlington Beach beside the HRER powerhouse. Trackwork was completed on September 4, 1896, to the end of the beach strip, and a first run for railway directors occurred on September 7. By November 7, service was extended to the Brant Hotel in Burlington. In early January 1898, service was further extended through the streets of Burlington along Maple Avenue, Elgin Street, John Street and James Street.

In February 1901, the Dominion Power and Transmission Company took over the HRER.

In 1904, the Hamilton Street Railway made a deal with the HRER to double-track the HRER line along Birch and Burlington Streets. This allowed the HRER to increase service and the HSR to serve riders at waterfront industries.

On March 3, 1906, service was extended east to Randall and Thomas Streets in Oakville. The HRER hoped that the Toronto and York Radial Railway would extend its Mimico line west from Port Credit to Oakville, but this never came to pass.

In 1907, the HRER moved out of its original Hamilton terminal at James and Gore Streets into the new Hamilton Terminal Station at King and Catherine Streets.

In 1917, the HRER built a larger carhouse in Burlington to replace the smaller carhouse on Burlington Beach. It was located on the north side of James Street between Pearl and Martha Streets.

During the winter of 1921–1922, the swing bridge over the Burlington Ship Canal was replaced with a bascule bridge. In May 1924, the HRER tracks on Birch Avenue in Hamilton were moved to a new private right of way on the west side of Birch Ave.

On August 3, 1925, the HRER line between Oakville and Port Nelson (at today's Guelph Line) was abandoned. In October 1925, the HRER was interlined with the Brantford and Hamilton Electric Railway so that riders could ride between Burlington and Brantford on a single ticket. In 1927, the line between Port Nelson and Burlington was abandoned. The remainder of the HRER ceased operation on January 5, 1929. HRER tracks west of Kenilworth Avenue in Hamilton were taken over by the Hamilton Street Railway.

== Postscript ==
After the HRER's abandonment, track was removed over the next 15 years. The last track removed was over the Burlington Canal Bridge in 1946 after which the bascule bridge became so light that it was stuck in the up-position until it could be manually lowered and rebalanced.

Most of its carload freight business was transferred to the Toronto, Hamilton and Buffalo Railway and Canadian National Railway, which operated over 4.8 kilometres (3 mi) of former HRER track. A small section of the HRER right-of-way remains in use for freight traffic in Hamilton's north industrial area, between Gage Avenue North and Parkdale Avenue North roughly parallel to Burlington Street East and Nikola Tesla Boulevard.

In 1982, Canadian National Railway abandoned the former Grand Trunk Railway line that paralleled the HRER along Hamilton and Burlington Beach. This right-of-way is now a rail trail for cyclists and walkers.

On some sections of Beach Avenue in Hamilton Beach, the boulevard is wider on the east side of the street than on the west side; the east side is where the double-track HRER line ran.

The HRER's Oakville Station still exists at the southeast corner of Randall and Thomas Streets. An extra storey has been added to the building, but the front of the building still retains its radial railway look.

== See also ==
- Hydro-Electric Railways
- Interurban
- List of Ontario railways
