= Canadian Pacific Building =

Canadian Pacific Building may refer to:

- Canadian Pacific Building (London)
- Canadian Pacific Building (New York City)
- Canadian Pacific Building (Toronto), completed in 1913

== See also ==
- Canadian Pacific (disambiguation)
