= Brantford and Hamilton Electric Railway =

Railway line in Canada

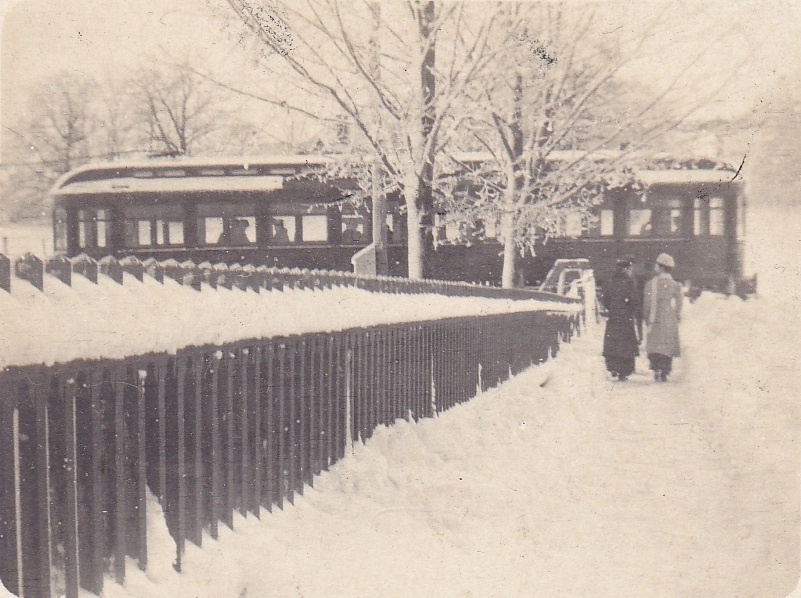
- In the earliest known photograph of the B&H in operation, an interurban car is seen at Ancaster during the winter of 1907-8.

Overview
- Parent company: Dominion Power and Transmission Company
- Headquarters: Hamilton, Ontario
- Reporting mark: B&H
- Locale: Southern Ontario
- Dates of operation: 21 December 1907 to Ancaster –30 June 1931

Technical
- Track gauge: 4 ft 8 1/2 in (1,435 mm) standard gauge
- Electrification: 600 V overhead

The Brantford and Hamilton Electric Railway (B&H) was an interurban electric railway which operated between Hamilton and Brantford in Ontario, Canada. According to Hilton & Due, this was the last radial (interurban) railway constructed in the Hamilton area and the only one built to a high standard.

== Route and operations ==
By the end of 1916, the Brantford and Hamilton Electric Railway line was at its maximum length. From Hamilton Terminal at Catherine Street, the line went east along Main Street and south on Hess Street to Aberdeen Avenue where it left the street to run southwest to the foot of Hamilton Mountain near present-day Dundurn Street South. It then climbed the escarpment on a 2.5 percent grade, that was 11 kilometres (7 mi) long and elevated the line by 150 metres (500 ft). Halfway up the escarpment, there was a station to serve a golf club and a sanitarium. The line reached the top of the escarpment near present-day Scenic Drive. The B&H passed through the communities of Ancaster, Alberton, Langford, and Cainsville. It entered Brantford on a private right-of-way running along Glenwood Drive paralleling a derelict canal. It terminated at the Lake Erie and Northern (LE&N) station at Lorne Bridge.

The LE&N, an interurban that ran between Port Dover and Galt, shared its station in Brantford with the B&H. Since LE&N used 1500 volts and the B&H 600 volts, two overhead wires were used at the station, and B&H crews had to be careful to select the correct wire. To avoid this problem, B&H cars were often parked outside of the station structure, which was a two-storey building with a single track passing through it on the ground floor. Except for the station area, B&H cars could not run on the LE&N rails because of the voltage difference.

After 1917, the LE&N had an interchange with the Grand Trunk Railway's (GTR) Tillsonburg line, which it accessed via the B&H to the east of the LE&N station. There was a small yard south of Wharfe Street for freight cars. To protect nearby B&H cars from electrical damage, there was also a storage track to park B&H cars while the LE&N was switching freight cars. The overhead wires in the shared area were isolated so they could be switched as needed between 1500 volts for LE&N or 600 volts for the B&H.

According to a B&H timetable, the service frequency was hourly with service from Hamilton starting at 6:30 am (8:20 am on Sundays) to 11:20 pm (10:20 pm on Sundays). A trip over the 37-kilometre (23 mi) line was scheduled to take 65 minutes. B&H customers could purchase interline tickets which allowed them to transfer to the LE&N in Brantford using a single ticket. Freight traffic included express, mail and milk which could be carried on box motors.

== History ==
On July 18, 1904, the Brantford and Hamilton Electric Railway was incorporated by federal charter. A token amount of construction was performed in 1905 to meet legal obligations. Grading for the line began on July 27, 1906. During construction, the original backers of the line ran into financial difficulties, and ownership of the line passed to the Dominion Power and Transmission Company in 1907.

Six cars were ordered from J. G. Brill Company which had a designed speed of 80 kilometres per hour (50 mph). The first cars arrived in June 1907; test runs started June 16.

The line was opened to Ancaster on December 21, 1907 and to Alfred Street in Brantford on May 23, 1908. After building a crossing with the Tillsonburg branch of the Grand Truck Railway (GTR), the line was extended to Market Street on November 3, 1908. After the interurban Lake Erie and Northern Railway (LE&N) constructed its line into Brantford, the B&H extended its line to Lorne Bridge on December 16, 1916 in order to share the LE&N station there, which the LE&N opened on March 12, 1917.

In 1917, the Board of Railway Commissioners ordered the LE&N and the GTR to interhange freight in Brantford. Since there was no suitable location along the LE&N line, the interchange was built on the B&H with the provision to switch the overhead wire between the LE&N's 1500 volts and the B&H's 600 volts. After a few months, a separate siding was built for B&H cars to lay over while the LE&N switched freight cars.

Circa 1921, the B&H set up a freight station at Alfred Street in Brantford. It used the body of a box car with the platform being a flat car.

On October 18, 1925, the B&H was interlined with the Hamilton Radial Electric Railway (HRER) so that trains ran from Burlington through to Brantford. This arrangement came to an end on January 5, 1929, when the HRER was replaced by buses. Also on that date, buses alternated with interurban cars to service the route between Hamilton and Brantford.

Dominion Power wished to sell its bus operations, but a condition of sale was that the remaining Hamilton radial lines be shut down. Thus, the final day of operation for the B&H was June 30, 1931. On February 2, 1932, an interurban car made one additional non-revenue run to collect portable equipment from substations along the line. The LE&N took over joint trackage from the B&H in Brantford. After much of the B&H's track was removed in 1932, the B&H discovered it left a freight motor stranded at Trinity; it had to be trucked to the scapyard.

The LE&N purchased the section of the B&H line it used from the LE&N station to just west of Lynwood Drive in order to serve several industries in the area as well as to maintain the interchange with Canadian National Railway (formerly the GTR). The former B&H tracks stayed in service until 1972.

== Postscript ==
Much of the route of the Brantford-Hamilton Electric Railway from Dundas ran parallel to the present-day Highway 403, also known as the Chedoke Expressway. The section east of Highway 403 is now operated by the City of Hamilton as the Chedoke Radial Trail, a 2.7-kilometre (1.7 mi) pedestrian and bicycle pathway. The trail includes the grade up the escarpment where there is a cut leaving a stone face on either side. The path of the former railway track is lost at the Highway 403 interchange at Mohawk Road, but can be picked up again as the Radial Right of Way Ancaster at the west end of Hiawatha Boulevard. The trail terminates at Wilson Street in the former municipality of Ancaster.

== See also ==
- Hydro-Electric Railways
- Lake Erie and Northern Railway
- Hamilton Radial Electric Railway
- Interurban
- List of Ontario railways
