= Canadian Pacific Building (London) =

Office building in London, England

Coordinates: 51.5074°N 0.1287°W

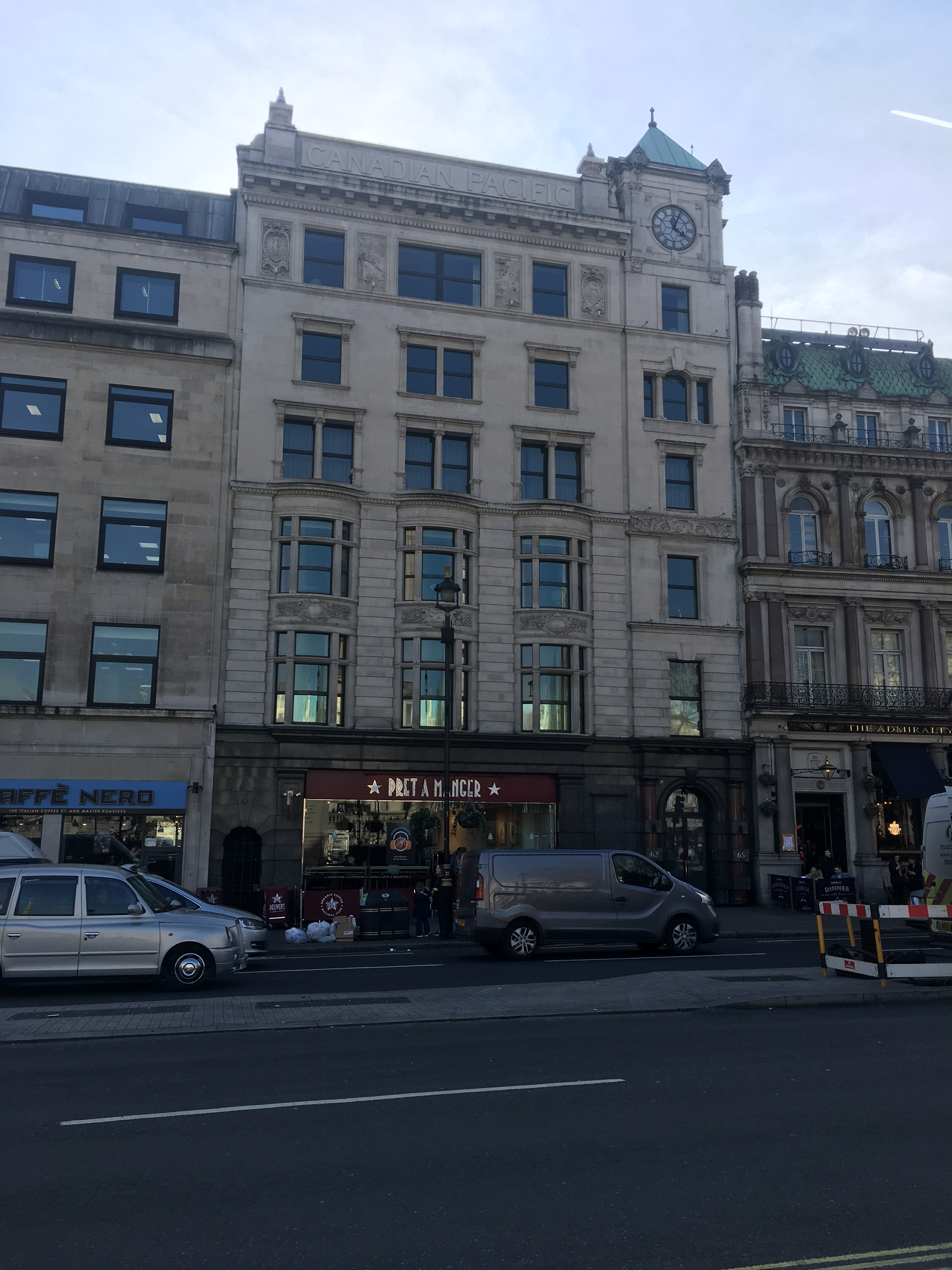

General information
- Location: 62-65 Trafalgar Square, London, England
- Year built: 1902-1903
- Opened: January 1904

Design and construction
- Architect: George Richards Julian

The Canadian Pacific Building at 62–65 Trafalgar Square (formerly 62–65 Charing Cross) is an office building in Westminster in London, England. It was constructed as the London offices of the Canadian Pacific Railway Company and its affiliated steamship line (CP Ships), hotel chain (Canadian Pacific Hotels), and other subsidiary companies. It is faced with Portland stone, features prominent CANADIAN PACIFIC signage, and houses a small clock tower. The building was designed by George Richards Julian.

Until 2011, the building was occupied by commercial and law offices, but BMB converted it into five luxury apartments. The project was completed in 2012, and the historic structure was renamed "Trafalgar One". One Penthouse from the Trafalgar has won the "London Evening Standard New Homes Awards"; this award is awarded to the "best apartment in London".
