= Canadian Pacific (disambiguation) =

Canadian Pacific was a Canadian railway that operated from 1881 to 2023

Canadian Pacific may also refer to:

- Canadian Pacific (film), a 1949 Western
- "Canadian Pacific" (song), a 1969 single by George Hamilton IV
- Canadian Pacific Air Lines, a Canadian airline
- Canadian Pacific Building (disambiguation), the name of several buildings
- Canadian Pacific Limited, a subsidiary company of Canadian Pacific Railway
- Canadian Pacific Steamships, a shipping company

== See also ==
- Canadian Pacific Kansas City, the legal successor to Canadian Pacific
- Canadian Northern Pacific Railway, a historic Canadian railway
- Royal Canadian Pacific, a luxury excursion passenger train
- British Columbia Coast, or the Canadian Pacific coast
