= Mount Pleasant station (Brant County, Ontario) =

Disused railway station in Canada

General information
- Location: Mount Pleasant, Brant County, Ontario; Canada
- Coordinates: 43.08090°N 80.31717°W
- Operator: Lake Erie and Northern Railway; Grand River Railway; Canadian Pacific Railway

History
- Opened: 1916
- Closed: 1955

Former services
Preceding station	Lake Erie and Northern Railway	Following station
Lundy Lane towards Galt Main Street	Mainline	Maple Grove (Ontario) towards Port Dover
Location

The Mount Pleasant railway station is a disused railway station in Mount Pleasant, Brant County, Ontario, Canada. The station was built in 1916 for the Lake Erie and Northern Railway (an interurban electric railway which was a Canadian Pacific Railway subsidiary) according to a standard Canadian Pacific design, and was later used by the Grand River Railway, which was also a subsidiary of Canadian Pacific. The station, along with the rest of the Lake Erie and Northern system, was closed to passenger traffic in 1955 after a series of final excursion trips.

Interurban railway service in the area began when the Grand Valley Railway Company purchased the Brantford Street Railway and extended it northward to Galt via Paris, Ontario, a process which was completed in 1904. By 1912, however, this line had been shut down due to poor track quality, and was ultimately sold to the City of Brantford, and later the Lake Erie and Northern. The Lake Erie and Northern, with its line still under construction in 1914, was purchased by the Canadian Pacific Railway, which was beginning to buy up and consolidate interurban railways. To complement its northern section between Galt and Brantford, the Lake Erie and Northern quickly built a southern section, initially to Simcoe, then to Port Dover, both in mid-1916. The surviving station building dates from this era, and is constructed according to a standard CPR pattern, with a steep roofline and prominent gables.

After the station closed, the building was moved onto private property on Mount Pleasant Road. A local group, the Brant Railway Heritage Society, is hoping to restore or recreate the station building as a railway museum.
