= List of subsidiary railways of the Canadian Pacific Railway =

Subsidiary railways

Canadian Pacific Railway, itself a subsidiary of Canadian Pacific Kansas City Limited (CPKC), owns or owned several subsidiary railways. Many of these subsidiaries retained their identity for an extended amount of time, while others were only on paper.

- Canadian Atlantic Railway
  - International Railway of Maine
  - New Brunswick Railway
  - Dominion Atlantic Railway
- Canadian Atlantic Railway
- Central Maine and Quebec Railway
- Columbia and Kootenay Railway
- Dakota, Minnesota and Eastern Railroad
- Esquimalt and Nanaimo Railway
- Grand River Railway
- Kaslo and Slocan Railway
- Kettle Valley Railway
- Lake Erie and Northern Railway
- Minneapolis, St. Paul and Sault Ste. Marie Railroad
- Nakusp and Slocan Railway
- Ontario and Quebec Railway
- Quebec Central Railway
- Toronto, Grey and Bruce Railway
- Toronto, Hamilton and Buffalo Railway
- TTX Company
- St. Lawrence and Hudson Railway
  - Delaware and Hudson Railway
- Soo Line Railroad
- Kansas City Southern Railway
- Kansas City Southern de México
- Meridian Speedway
