= Burlington Canal Lift Bridge =

Lift bridge in Burlington, Ontario, Canada

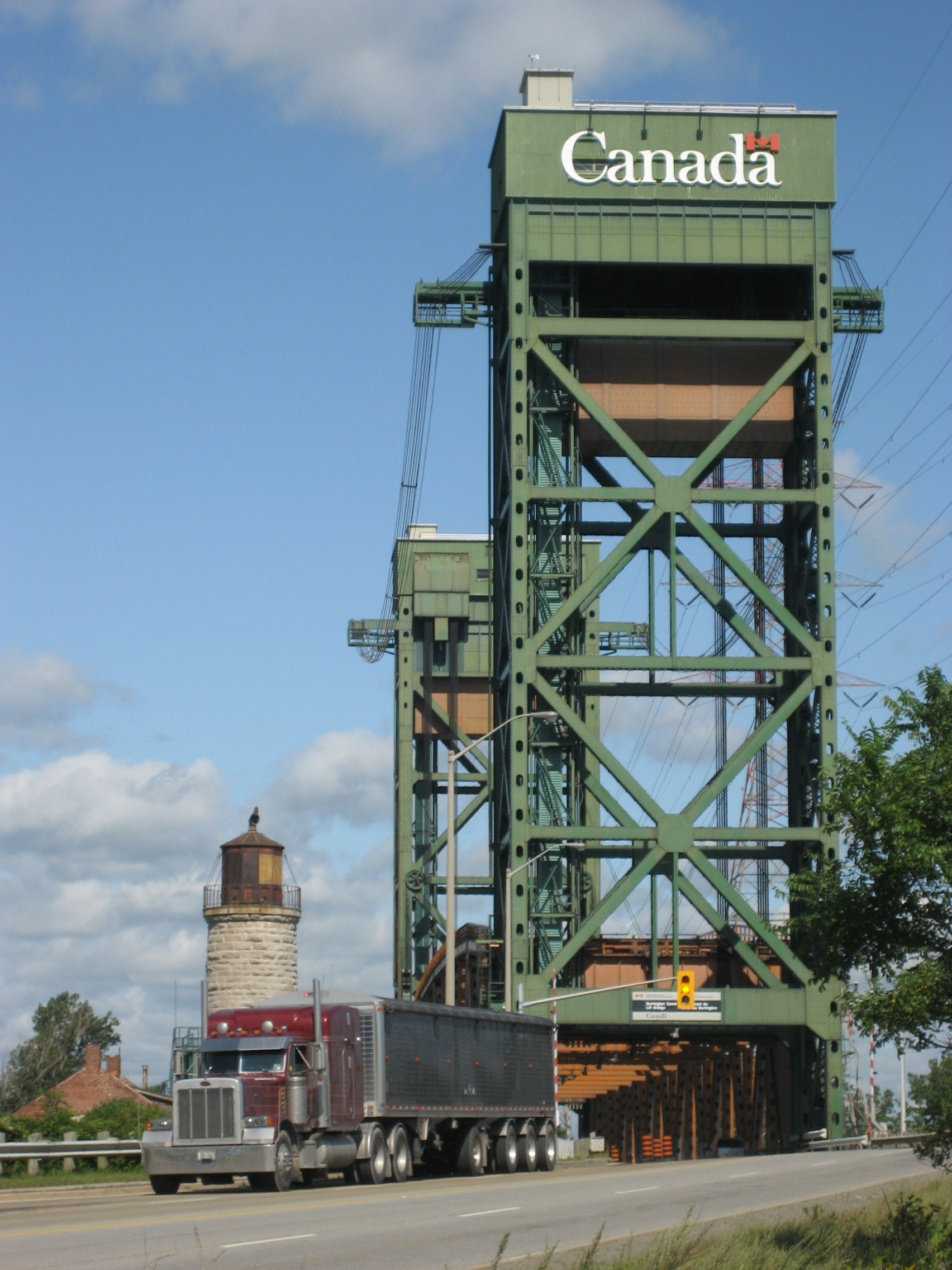
- View of Burlington Canal Lift Bridge
- Coordinates: 43.299105°N 79.795317°W
- Carries: 4 lanes of Eastport Drive
- Crosses: Hamilton Harbour
- Locale: Hamilton, Ontario and Burlington, Ontario
- Maintained by: Public Works Canada

Characteristics
- Design: steel vertical-lift bridge
- Total length: 116 metres (381 ft)
- Clearance above: 5 metres (16 ft) - when lowered 36.5 metres (120 ft) - when lifted to maximum height

History
- Opened: 1962

Location
- Interactive map of Burlington Canal Lift Bridge

The Burlington Canal Lift Bridge is a vertical lift bridge located to the north side of the Burlington Bay James N. Allan Skyway in Burlington, Ontario, Canada.

Built in 1962, the 116-metre-long (381 ft) bridge is the sixth bridge to span the Burlington Canal since 1830. The bridge allows vessels to enter and exit from Hamilton Harbour into Lake Ontario. The bridge does not lift during the winter months (January to late March).

The bridge carries Eastport Drive across the canal with two lanes for traffic in each direction, as well as a single pedestrian walkway on the west side. Traffic lights and signalized gates are found on both ends of the bridge. The road surface on the bridge is not paved, but rather metal grating.

In 1896 Hamilton Radial Electric Railway cars crossed the 1877 bridge. Before 1982 it also carried rail traffic along a CN Rail (Hamilton and North-Western Railway) route but the section of the line was removed and the bridge converted to a vehicular bridge.

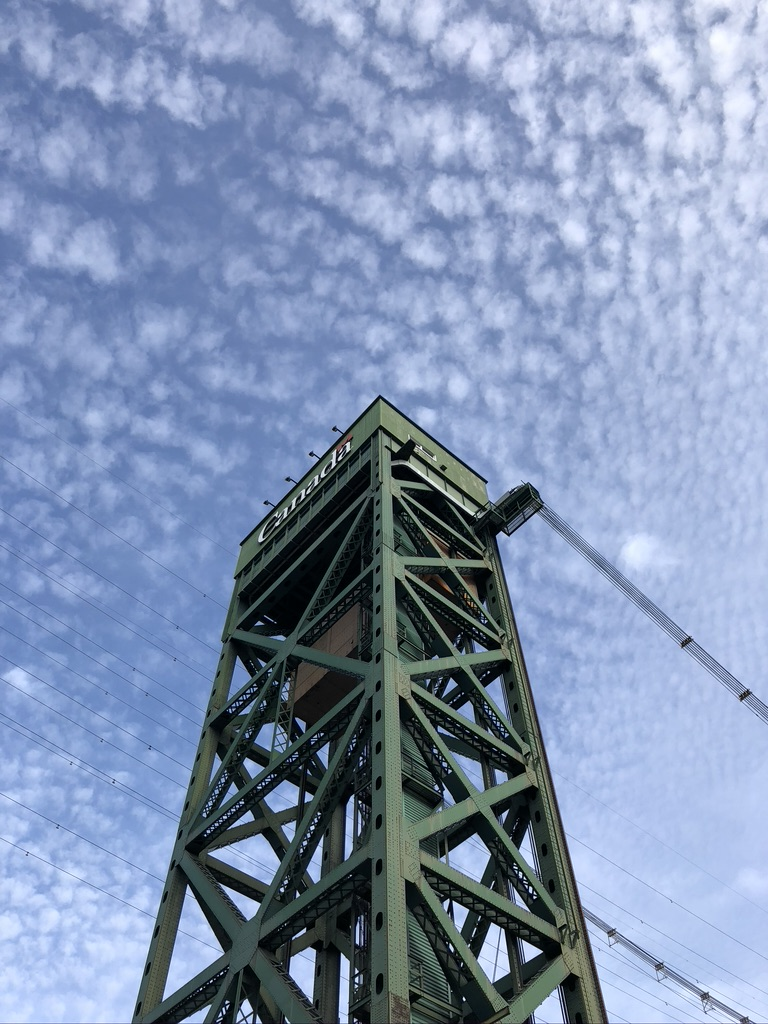
North tower of the Burlington Canal Lift Bridge

The bridge is maintained and owned by Public Works Canada.

== Earlier Bridges ==
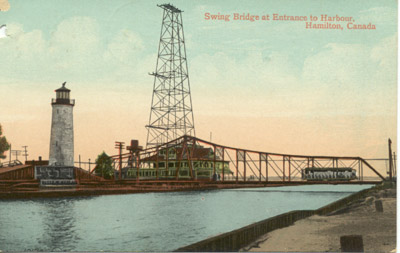
1901 swing bridge

Several bridges were built from 1826 to 1952 to accommodate railway, radial and vehicular traffic:

- 1826: wooden bridge built; damaged in storm
- 1830: swing bridge built; damaged by schooner Elsie Hope
- 1877: 375 foot through-truss manual swing bridge built by Hamilton and North-Western Railway replaces scow service
- 1901: steel truss electric swing bridge
- 1921-1922: single leaf bascule bridge
- 1952: temporary bridge built to replace the north leaf bascule bridge

The last three bridges were demolished following the completion of the current bridge in 1962.
