= Windsor, Essex and Lake Shore Rapid Railway =

The Windsor, Essex and Lake Shore Rapid Railway was an electric radial railway of southern Ontario, Canada. Interurban passenger and freight service was operated from 1907 to 1932 between Windsor and Leamington on 37 miles of single track.

== History ==
Incorporated in 1901, the company sought to build an electric railway from Windsor to Leamington, through Essex and Kingsville. It took until 1905 to secure funds for the line and construction began in Windsor. The section between Windsor and Kingsville Harbour was opened on September 19, 1907, followed by an extension from Four Corners in Kingsville (Division Street and Main Street) to Leamington on April 10, 1908. The section between Four Corners and Kingsville Harbour became a branch that was called the Kingsville street car, but was in fact served by the main line cars running up and down the branch on their way to and from Leamington. The power station, car barn, and headquarters of the company were situated just north of the terminus at Kingsville Harbour in Park Street. Another short branch was built in Leamington on Sherk Street to Seacliff Park. The line was mostly heavy rail, built on the streets in Windsor, Kingsville and Leamington, and on private right-of-way or next to public highways in between. The line used alternating current and the heavy interurban motor cars were equipped with pantographs, unlike most electric railways in Canada at that time.

Following the rise of the automobile in the 1920s, the railway struggled and the company threatened to abandon the line. The communities along the line, including the city of Windsor, the towns of Essex, Kingsville and Leamington, but also the townships of Sandwich East, Sandwich South, Sandwich West (now all part of Windsor), Gosfield North, and Gosfield South (now both part of Kingsville), stepped up and bought the line, which was finalized on September 8, 1929. The communities formed the Windsor, Essex & Lake Shore Electric Railway Association and put the company under the control of the Essex Division of the Hydro-Electric Railways, owned by Ontario Hydro. The line was modernized, the electric system changed to direct current, and the heavy cars were replaced by brand-new lighter motor cars. The line was now branded as The Sunshine County Route which was also painted on the sides of the cars.

However, after the Great Depression, traffic remained slow and the association suspended service on September 15, 1932. After unsuccessfully trying to sell the line to one of the other railway companies serving the Windsor area, the association dismantled the line in 1935.

== Route ==
The terminus in Windsor was in Pitt Street, one block south of the Grand Trunk Railway station, east of the corner of Ouellette Avenue. There was no track connection to the Windsor street car system that had a line on Ouellette. The line followed Pitt Street east, turned south into Windsor Avenue (now Windsor Justice Facility Park) and further east into Chatham Street. The track turned south again into Aylmer Avenue and ran on that street until it became Howard Avenue. It followed this street out of the city. Where the street crossed the main line of the Michigan Central Railroad, the interurban track turned onto private right-of-way next to the steam railway tracks. In Maidstone, the track left the vicinity of the Michigan Central and ran along Talbot Road through Essex where it finally crossed the Michigan Central trackage. The interurban went straight onto County Road 34 and remained next to this road through Cottam where it turned south along Division Road and Division Street into Kingsville. The main line turned east onto Main Street in Kingsville, but track was also laid in Kingsville, south of the corner of Main Street, in Division Street, Mill Street, Lansdowne Avenue and Park Street to the car barn near Kingsville Harbour. Just west of the Pere Marquette Railroad crossing, the main line left Main Street and continued on private right-of-way, first parallel to Main Street and then turning north and later east, running parallel to the modern Road 2 E. The right-of-way reached Leamington near Ellison Avenue and Melrose Avenue and then turned north onto Erie Street. The branch to Seacliff Park along Sherk Street was connected to the private right-of-way just west of Erie Street. On Erie Street the track went through Leamington to the terminus at Wilkinson Drive where a waiting room was built.

The main track, which included the ca. 1.2 miles (1.9 kilometres) long branch to Kingsville Harbour, was 37.35 miles (60.11 kilometres) in length, with an additional 1.85 miles (2.98 kilometres) of siding and freight tracks.

== Service ==
Passenger service along the main line at the beginning of operations was every two hours, with additional trips on weekdays that did not make the round trip along the Kingsville street car track to Kingsville Harbour, but instead turned right into Main Street at Four Corners coming from Windsor, or turning north at this corner coming from Leamington. The daily cars ran from Windsor to Leamington in one hour and 45 minutes, the additional weekday cars needed 20 minutes less. In its final year, effective September 8, 1931, the basic service pattern was changed, and the daily trips were offered only every three hours.

Freight service was offered for local businesses along the line, including the Cottam canning factory into which a short branch was laid. In Leamington, a freight track connected the main line from Erie Street to the Pere Marquette railroad station.

== Rolling stock ==
Throughout most of its history, the line used three heavy interurban motor cars and four trailer cars. These cars were scrapped or sold, and in 1930, four new lightweight motor cars (No. 501, 503, 505, 507) and one trailer car (No. 502) were bought from the Ottawa Car Company. For freight operations, the company bought an electric locomotive (No. 9) built in 1914 for the Niagara, St. Catharines and Toronto Railway. After 1935, the passenger cars were sold to the Montreal and Southern Counties Railway.

== See also ==
- List of Ontario railways
- List of defunct Canadian railways
