= Lake Erie and Northern Railway =

Former interurban railway in Ontario, Canada

Overview
- Reporting mark: LE&N
- Locale: Grand River Valley, Ontario
- Dates of operation: 1916–1955 (end of passenger service)
- Predecessor: Grand Valley Railway
- Successor: Canadian Pacific Electric Lines

Technical
- Track gauge: 4 ft 8 1/2 in (1,435 mm) standard gauge
- Electrification: 1500 V DC overhead
- Length: 80 km (50 mi)

The Lake Erie and Northern Railway (reporting mark LE&N) was an interurban electric railway which operated in the Grand River Valley in Ontario, Canada. The railway owned and operated a north–south mainline which ran from Galt in the north (now a part of Cambridge) to Port Dover on the shore of Lake Erie in the south. Along the way, it ran through rural areas of Waterloo County, Brant County, and Norfolk County, as well as the city of Brantford, where it had an interchange with the Brantford and Hamilton Electric Railway. Construction on the mainline began in 1913. The railway began operations in 1916 as a subsidiary of the Canadian Pacific Railway (CPR), which had purchased the line before construction had finished. In 1931, it was consolidated with the Grand River Railway under a single CPR subsidiary, the Canadian Pacific Electric Lines (CPEL), which managed both interurban railways, though they continued to exist as legally separate entities. Passenger service was discontinued in 1955 but electric freight operations continued until 1961, when the LE&N's electric locomotives were replaced by diesel CPR locomotives and the line was de-electrified. In the same year, service on the mainline from Simcoe to Port Dover was discontinued, but the remainder continued to operate as a branchline which as early as 1975 was known as the CP Simcoe Subdivision. The remainder of the line was officially abandoned in the early 1990s, ending almost seventy-five years of operation.

== History ==
=== Background ===
Railway construction and operation in the area preceded the Lake Erie and Northern by over fifty years. The railway boom in Canada West (the administrative predecessor to the province of Ontario) from the 1850s onward resulted in a number of east–west lines owned by competing companies: the Grand Trunk Railway (GTR) and Canadian Pacific Railway (CPR) lines through Galt (which became a major regional rail hub), the Toronto, Hamilton and Buffalo Railway through Brantford, and the New York Central Railroad and Michigan Central Railroad lines through Waterford. While these railways stimulated the local economy and created export opportunities both for farmers (mostly situated along the Grand River and its tributaries and floodplain) and small but rapidly industrializing cities like Galt and Brantford, the primary intent behind the construction of many of these rail lines was to connect large urban centres in Ontario like Toronto and Hamilton with the American border, or to create a shorter route for American fast freight and passenger express trains to travel around Lake Erie, as opposed to the longer route through Ohio. This was the intent behind the Canada Air Line, an air-line railway which took the shortest practical route through the area. Merchants and exporters, primarily in Brantford, felt that they were poorly served by these east–west lines, which allowed certain railways to monopolize access to different towns and cities and charge high freight fees. The east–west lines also did not connect the communities along the Grand River valley, which were naturally linked together by shared history and geography.

In 1900, the first attempt at a north–south line was underway, with the construction of the Port Dover, Brantford, Berlin and Goderich Railway, an ambitious attempt to link these centres together. These ambitions were tempered by a lack of capital, however, and the company was sold off and renamed the Grand Valley Railway (GVR) in 1902, with a plan to initially connect Brantford and Galt. Galt's merchants and town boosters, meanwhile, focused mainly on constructing a link to Berlin (now known as Kitchener), an initiative that would eventually result in the Grand River Railway, which began operation in 1914.

With a clear short-term goal, the Grand Valley Railway Company purchased the Brantford Street Railway in 1903, then extended it, ultimately creating a 21-mile (34 km) electric interurban line linking Brantford, Paris, and Galt, which opened for traffic in November 1904. After opening, however, the GVR began to suffer from a number of chronic problems: the difficult terrain and poor quality of construction created operational problems, and the company was unable to secure enough lucrative freight contracts to maintain profitability. Service was suspended by 1912 due to poor track quality, and ultimately the line was sold to the City of Brantford in March 1914. The northern section from Paris to Galt was promptly sold in 1915 to the Lake Erie and Northern Railway, which promptly closed the line to eliminate competition; the southern section from Brantford to Paris was operated as a part of Brantford's municipal public transit system until it was shut down in 1929 and replaced by buses. This marked the end of the first attempt at a north–south link.

=== Planning and charter (1911–1915) ===
The second attempt at a north–south link was the one which would ultimately result in the Lake Erie and Northern Railway. Another Brantford-led initiative, it was more measured in its ambitions. The goal of the Lake Erie and Northern's backers was to create a reliable freight and passenger link which connected Galt, Brantford, and Port Dover, with the hope that this would give them access to freight traffic on Lake Erie and allow a possible connection to Ohio. A Dominion charter application was noted in the trade journal Railway and Marine World in February 1911, and over the course of 1911 and 1912, the details of the plan were developed further. In March 1911, newspapers reported two more key details: first, that the charter application which was being debated in the Dominion parliament had been revised to allow for a branch line to Ayr starting from a junction at Paris or Glen Morris; and second, that the charter would also allow for the company to operate a steam shipping line across Lake Erie, which would allow it to deliver coal to Brantford and northern locations at a cheaper rate than the existing coal supply route through Buffalo. By April 1911, the bill authorizing the company charter had been passed, and Great Lakes shipping was being emphasized even further; far from a simple line extension across the lake, a water route from Port Dover to Fort William in Northwestern Ontario was being discussed, with the idea that lake steamers would carry loads of Michigan lumber on return trips. Planning on the mainline began, but the route from Brantford to Port Dover was not approved until almost a year later, in March 1912.

Developments in early 1912 encouraged the railway's promoters. Near the end of March, it was announced that the Dominion government would subsidize the construction of the mainline, as well as that the company had secured a contract with the Hydro-Electric Power Commission of Ontario (HEPCO) to supply electric power for the line's proposed electric traction system, with HEPCO to construct a new electrical substation between Paris and Brantford.

==== Construction begins ====
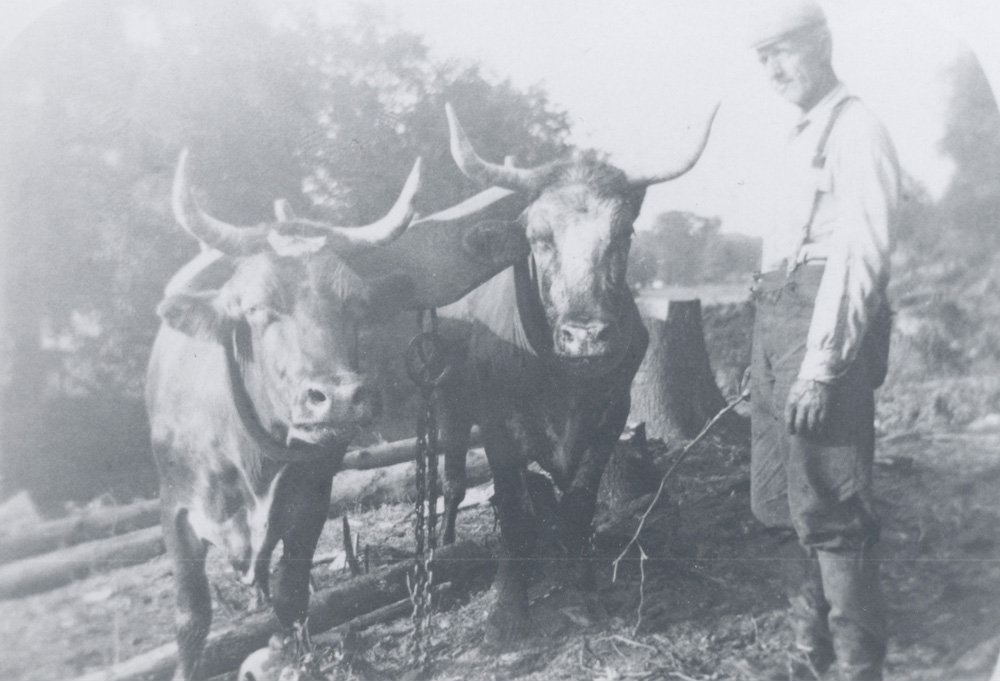
A pair of oxen which were used in construction of the railway

Construction began in May 1913, and grading camps were established by June. Built roughly in parallel with the existing GVR line, the Lake Erie and Northern was constructed according to higher and more modern quality standards, and avoided many of the problems with tight turns and steep grades that the GVR suffered from. The result was a high track quality and significant number of grade separations along the route, made necessary by the amount of traffic on the main lines the LE&N crossed. In Paris, it passed under the Grand Trunk Railway high-level bridge, which is still used by CN and Via Rail trains today. At Waterford, which was a junction point for the Canada Southern Railway (later Michigan Central) and Toronto, Hamilton and Buffalo Railway, the LE&N followed a high trestle bridge over the tracks, creating a full grade separation. This allowed for the LE&N to run the kind of high-frequency service which began to be expected of electric interurban railways in the early 20th century, without potential interruption by cross-traffic on the mainlines.

In 1914, with the line still under construction, the LE&N was purchased by the CPR, which finalized the line's status as an interurban. This followed contemporary trends, where medium-distance passenger traffic was being shifted onto electric lines and served by high-frequency short trains. In May 1915, the line was electrified with 1500 Volts DC.

=== Pre-amalgamation era (1916–1931) ===
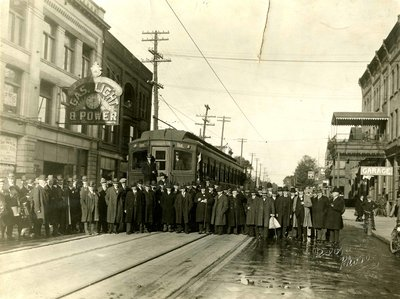
A group of businessmen next to the special 1917 "Elmira to Erie train" operated by the Lake Erie and Northern, intended to promote economic links along the corridor

Passenger service began earlier than planned, on 7 February 1916. This was only along the northern section of the line, which was between Galt and Brantford. Four days earlier, on February 3, spring floods had damaged the Grand Valley Railway track north of Paris, leading to the end of passenger services on that line. The first test run had only occurred on February 2, and installation of the overhead line allowing electric traction operations to occur had only happened a week before the start of service.

At the start of service, the southern terminus was near Scarfe Avenue in Brantford. There, an old boxcar was used as a temporary station until 1917. This was due to delays in both engineering works around downtown Brantford caused by the cramped geometry of the city and the river, as well as due to disputes between the Lake Erie and Northern Railway Company and the city of Brantford over where the station would be located. The Lake Erie and Northern's preferred station location was at Scarfe Avenue, while the city's preferred location was near the Lorne Bridge. Ultimately, the city's preferred location was chosen.

Service between Brantford and Simcoe began on 2 June 1916. In a false start, service to Port Dover began on July 1, but this ended after only a few hours due to power supply issues. A steam service was substituted to serve beach excursionists until electric service properly resumed on July 22. At Port Dover, services initially terminated at Main Street in the north end of the town. Almost a year later and after signing a joint operations agreement, the Lake Erie and Northern shifted its terminus to the existing Grand Trunk Railway station near the waterfront. This would only last until 1923, when the LE&N built its own station in downtown Port Dover, permanently abandoning its hopes of easy connections via Lake Erie.

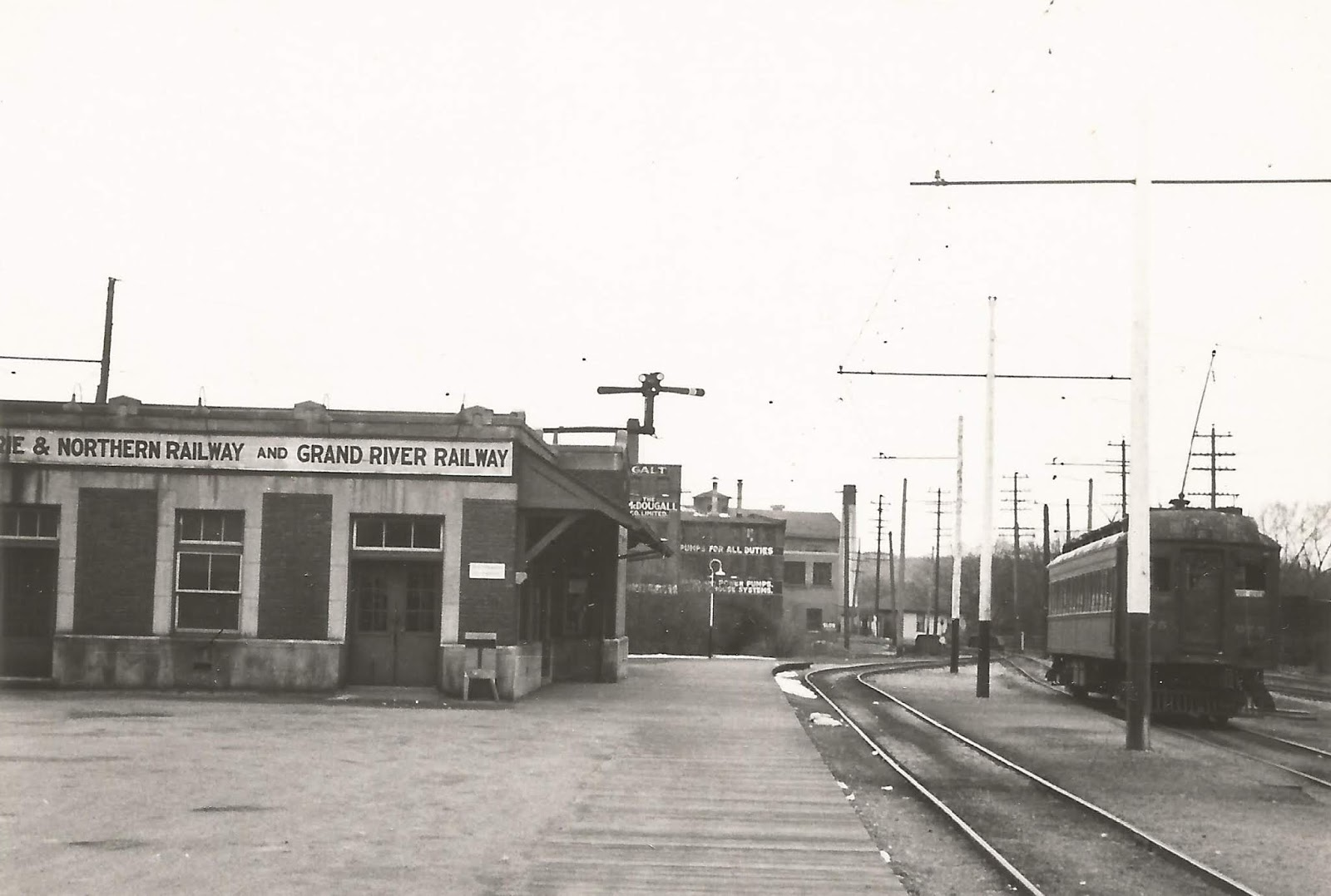
The joint station with the Grand River Railway at Main Street in Galt, as seen in 1947

With the location of the Brantford station decided, construction began. The unique bi-level station with the Brantford and Hamilton Electric Railway opened in 1917, allowing for smooth passenger transfer which permitted both north–south and east–west travel along frequent electric interurban lines.

The railway's early rolling stock consisted of four 58-foot-long (18 m) passenger coaches, constructed of wood and steel, which were numbered 225, 235, 245, and 255; two control trailers numbered 265 and 275; two electric freight locomotives numbered 50 and 60; and two combination express/passenger cars numbered 209 and 219. Despite this limited stock, trains were running every two hours.

=== Canadian Pacific Electric Lines (1931) ===
The system reached the peak of its success in 1921, with an annual passenger ridership of 600,000. By this time it had become popular with summer excursion tourists from the industrial cities of Kitchener, Preston, Galt, and Brantford, who wanted to visit Port Dover to access Lake Erie's recreation opportunities. In an early sign of integration with the Grand River Railway, LE&N's rolling stock was renumbered to complement the GRNR's, with the wood-and-steel passenger cars being renumbered as 933, 935, 937 and 939, the trailer cars as 953 and 955, the freight locomotives to 335 and 333, and the combination cars to 797 and 795. Around this time, two new all-steel passenger cars, manufactured by the Preston Car Company, were sold to the LE&N and numbered as 973 and 975. A third freight locomotive, also manufactured by the Preston Car Company, was purchased and numbered as 337.

With the growing system integration between the GRNR and LE&N, freight options were slowly merged, with the two systems operating as a single freight line serving around 450 different industries along the corridor, and GRNR and LE&N locomotives often seen operating as a multi-unit train.

The slow integration process concluded with an amalgamation in 1931 of the two lines under the name Canadian Pacific Electric Lines (CPEL), though the railways remained legally separate entities, and trains maintained their original liveries.

=== Early decline and renaissance (1931–1950) ===
While freight traffic remained fairly steady, passenger ridership would never equal the peak in 1921. The advent of the Great Depression decreased the economic benefits and ridership created by tourism, and automobile travel allowed recreational travellers to access summer cottages and resorts along both Lake Huron and Lake Erie more easily, decreasing Port Dover's importance as a tourist hub.

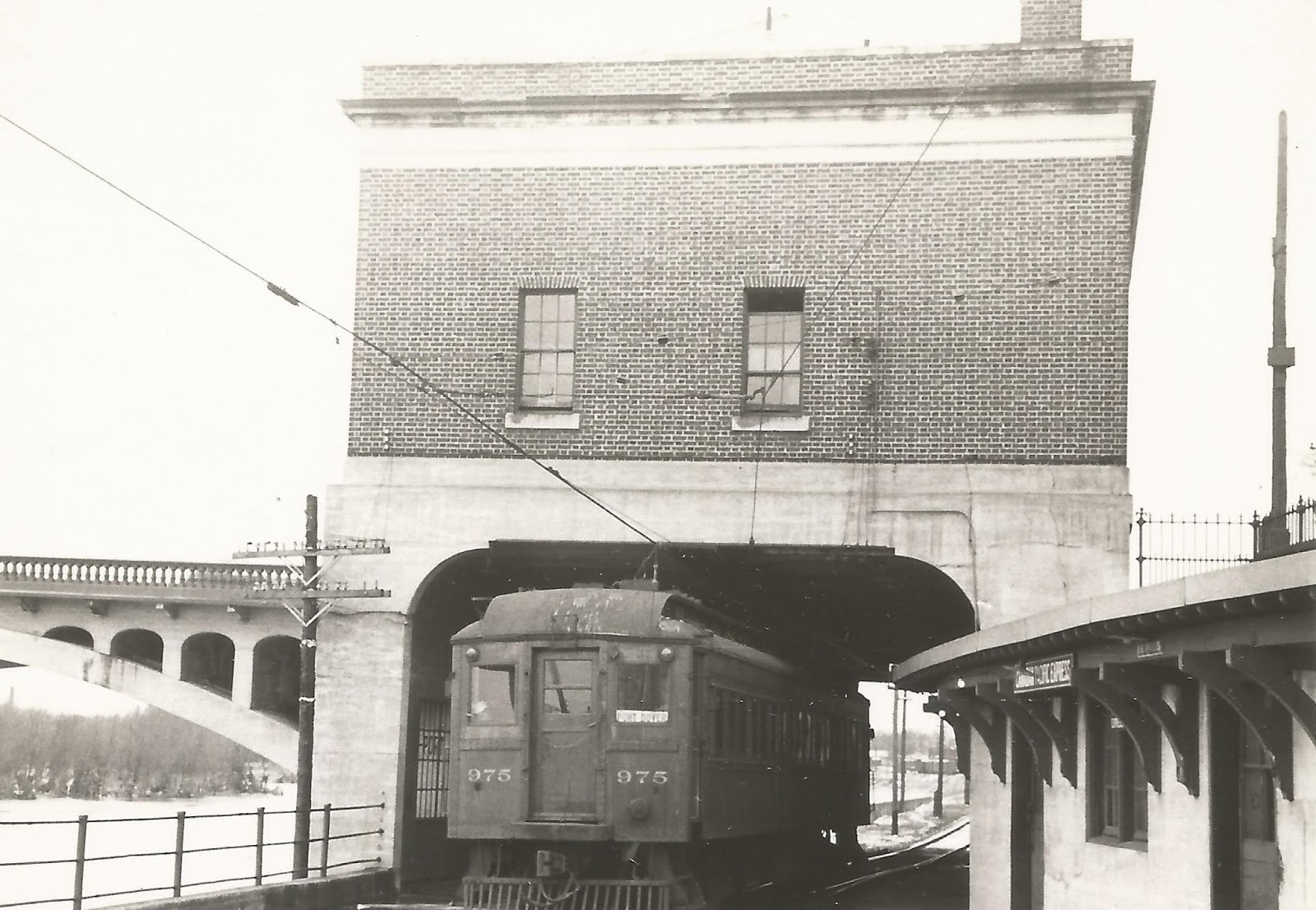
A view of the Brantford Union Station from the platform level, as seen in 1947

As well, the LE&N system lost a major interconnection point when the Brantford and Hamilton Electric Railway was acquired in 1930 by the Hydro-Electric Power Commission of Ontario (the predecessor of Ontario Hydro and Hydro One), and closed halfway through 1931. This cut off the easy passenger connection to Hamilton, further decreasing the viability of the southern half of the line. Still, in 1938 the CPR funded a new "union" station at Galt's Main Street in contemporary art deco-style, a sign of the gradual shift of the centre of the combined lines toward Preston and Galt, rather than Brantford.

In 1944, with the Second World War nearing its close, the unified CPEL system had a brief renaissance, with a total annual system ridership of 1,680,000, almost double that of any other best year. This was typical of the wartime period, when many interurban systems were heavily utilized, as war production stimulated employment and therefore commuter traffic, and electric systems were seen as a way to conserve fuel. This would prove to be fatal to many systems, as the same wartime materials rationing which stimulated traffic on electric systems also robbed them of vital service manpower and materials (especially steel), as these were diverted to war production and to the armed forces.

By the end of the war, the age of interurbans were largely seen to have passed, and many Canadian and American interurban lines had already been shut down and scrapped. Large railway companies increasingly saw passenger service, which had rarely turned a significant profit, as a liability, and were unwilling to maintain and upgrade their existing fleets of decades-old rolling stock. The geopolitical realities of the postwar period resulted in decreased petroleum prices, eliminating one of the main financial advantages of interurbans over buses. The benefits of interurbans often translated into economic benefits for the towns and cities they served, as many cities during the interurban period had begun to construct suburbs whose populations commuted into downtown cores to work and shop. This often failed to translate to into profits for railway companies. As a result, many interurban lines were bought by municipalities and combined with their electric streetcar lines. Others, however, were simply shut down.

After the war, the CPR undertook several investments in the LE&N and the entire CPEL system, which would prove to be the last. In 1946, all of the cars which had been purchased in 1921 were sent to the CPR Angus Shops in Montreal for extensive upgrading, including mechanical improvements and refurbished interiors. In the same year and with many interurbans shutting down during this period, used rolling stock was highly available, so the CPR purchased three electric freight locomotives from the defunct Salt Lake and Utah Railroad, as well as extensively refurbishing the existing three locomotives at the GRNR shops in Preston. In a move which would prove to be historic, the CPR purchased for the line the final interurban rail car built in Canada: a steel combine ordered from National Steel Car in 1947.

=== End of passenger service ===
In 1950, the CPR made an application with the Canadian Transportation Commission, Canada's federal transportation regulator, to abandon passenger service along the line. Municipalities along the line objected strongly to the application, and indefinite continuation of service was ruled to be in the public good. However, the CTC left the CPEL with a loophole: that unprofitable passenger runs could be cut as long as overall service was not jeopardized. The CPEL had already cut a number of passenger runs before the ruling, and afterward cut more, ending the period of "streetcar type" service along the line. Grand River Railway trains began to terminate at the CPR's mainline station in Galt, breaking the CPEL system in half, as passengers transferring to the LE&N would have to walk three-quarters of a mile south to the Main Street station to transfer. Confusingly, LE&N trains also ran north past Main Street to the CPR station to deliver express packages, but no attempt was made to unify passenger services at the station.

As well as changes in schedules and destinations, the CPR undertook a number of other changes to the system in an attempt to force the total switch from passenger to freight. The combine cars had their passenger capacities reduced and freight increased, with tonnage figures increasing gradually. As well, with rising automobile traffic in the urban areas the railway passed through, trains began to suffer from collisions, such as one in June 1951 with a police truck in Port Dover. In response, the CPR had the cars totally repainted to its signature maroon colour (further erasing the LE&N image and replacing it with the CPEL brand) with black and yellow warning markings for motorists and pedestrians.

By 1954, the CPR's deliberate campaign to sabotage passenger service by decreasing the frequency of trains, scheduling trains at unusual hours, and providing misleading and confusing information to passengers, along with prevailing social factors, had taken their toll, and passenger ridership was down to 160,000 for the entire CPEL system. The CPR transferred its lucrative express shipping operations to truck operations, further undercutting the profitability of passenger operations, and justifying further cuts to service. The company submitted a second application to abandon passenger services, which was accepted in March 1955.

The LE&N line, with its ample scenery and connection to Port Dover, had been popular with railway excursion groups well before the announcement of closure, and ridership increased significantly near the end of revenue service. Veteran employees, local officials, and members of the communities served by the line rode it in large groups, and even larger crowds turned out to watch. Even after the official end of revenue service on 23 April 1955, groups such as the National Railway Historical Society scheduled a number of popular excursion runs which featured multiple rail cars coupled together into single large convoys. The final passenger trip using the original passenger cars was taken on 1 May 1955 by the Buffalo chapter of the National Railway Historical Society, and further attempts to organize excursions were rebuffed by the CPR, "supposedly based in the fear that their appearance might provoke a clamour for reinstatement of service." The CPR quickly began to scrap the railway's older rolling stock. Attempts by the CPR to sell off the newer steel cars to other railways were unsuccessful, and a number were purchased by railway enthusiasts and preserved in museums. The remainder of the passenger cars were scrapped in 1957, with only freight and maintenance vehicles remaining as the CPR converted the system fully to freight operations.

=== Closure and abandonment ===
After the end of passenger service, the CPR continued to use electric freight locomotives to serve its freight customers along the line. Passenger bus service was provided by Canada Coach Lines out of Galt, with four trips a day. This service would continue until 1962, when the Galt operations ended. In the same year, the CPR abandoned the section of track from Simcoe to Port Dover, and converted the remainder of the line from electric to diesel, scrapping its power lines. Freight customers along the line were thereafter served by CPR diesel locomotives.

In 1989, CP Rail applied with the Canadian Transportation Agency (CTA) for permission to abandon the remainder of the line. Objections to the application were filed by some remaining freight customers on the line, such as Mitten Vinyl and Paris Technical Ceramics, as well as the Ontario Ministry of Transportation, the mayor of Paris, and the Ontario Locomotive and Car Company (OLC), the latter of which presented a plan to operate tourist trains along the portion of the LE&N line immediately north of Paris. Ultimately the CTA ruled in favour of abandonment, and the line was abandoned with the OLC plan unrealized.

== Passenger operations and ridership ==
Ridership (LE&N)
Year	Riders
1916	373,000
1921	609,000
1929	350,000
1931	231,000

Ridership (CPEL) (Note: CPEL ridership figures represent passenger traffic on the entire Canadian Pacific Electric Lines system; statistics for the Grand River Railway and Lake Erie and Northern Railway were not counted separately after the CPEL management and accounting structure was created.)
Year	Riders
1932	839,000
1938	748,000
1940	1,680,000
1948	941,000
1950	581,000
1952	283,000
1954	161,000

Passenger service on the Lake Erie and Northern Railway was at frequencies of every two hours, and according to rail historian John Mills, passenger traffic "was never particularly heavy." Frequencies were significantly lower than on its northern counterpart, the Grand River Railway. The Lake Erie and Northern line proved popular with seasonal tourists, as it connected densely populated industrial cities with the beach at Port Dover while also following what Mills calls "possibly the most continuously beautiful interurban section in Eastern Canada" alongside the Grand River. This scenic section, however, generated little passenger traffic and created a natural break-point in passenger service. The area between Brantford and Port Dover was more well-populated, and also provided more stable year-round passenger traffic.

After the amalgamation of the Lake Erie and Northern Railway and the Grand River Railway under the Canadian Pacific Electric Lines, individual ridership statistics for each railway were no longer calculated, and would have been complicated regardless by the growing prevalence of through-running along both lines. As the Lake Erie and Northern was always the less busy of the two CPEL lines, it would have proportionally represented only a fraction of overall CPEL statistics. Nevertheless, clear trends are visible. Before amalgamation, ridership on the Lake Erie and Northern peaked in 1921 at 609,000 following the First World War, the post-World War I recession, and the Depression of 1920–1921; in comparison, Grand River Railway ridership peaked around the same time (Note: In 1920.) at around 1.5 million. For the Lake Erie and Northern, this represented a steady rise since the start of service, when ridership was recorded as 373,000 in the first year. Both railways' ridership steadily declined through the 1920s, and by 1931, the last year for which independent ridership statistics were recorded, ridership on both lines had dropped to around 50% (for the GRR) and 38% (for the LE&N) of their respective peaks. (Note: 1931 ridership on the Grand River Railway was 743,000, which represents a drop of around 50% from a 1920 peak of approximately 1.5 million. In the same year, the Lake Erie and Northern reported a ridership of 231,000, representing a calculated drop of 38% from the 1921 maximum of 609,000.)

== Heritage ==
=== Stations ===
The former LE&N stations in Galt, Paris, Waterford, Brantford, and a number of other destinations have been demolished, but several stations still stand. An old stone house used as a station in Glen Morris stands in its original location alongside an information kiosk about the history of the railway. At Port Dover, both stations used by the LE&N survive in some form: the original union station with the GTR has been moved to the beach and serves as a gift shop, while the 1923 LE&N station serves as a municipal storage facility at the east end of Chapman Street.

The Mount Pleasant station, which was moved to Mount Pleasant Road and now sits on private property, is still standing but is in poor condition. In 2019, a local railway heritage group, the Brant Railway Heritage Society, embarked on an ambitious plan to relocate the station, which was built in 1916, to the Mount Pleasant Community Park, restore the building, and open it as a railway museum. The building has been noted as being regionally unique due to its layout, as well as its status as the only surviving original LE&N station.

=== Rolling stock ===
While much of the LE&N rolling stock was scrapped after the end of service, a few pieces of its fleet remain and are stored at the Halton County Railway Museum:

- LE&N #797, one of the combination cars, originally kept at the Seashore Trolley Museum in Kennebunkport, Maine
- LE&N M-4, a self-propelled electric welding car, which is believed to be the only surviving example of an ERICO Bonder
- LE&N M-6, a 1934 Ford-built delivery truck modified to serve as a line truck, which saw service until 1962
- LE&N #50/335, an electric freight locomotive, sold to the Cornwall Street Railway after dieselization of freight service in 1962, remained in operation until the early 1970s

=== Trails ===
A number of rail trails were created along the former right of way after abandonment of the line. This includes the Cambridge to Paris Rail Trail, the SC Johnson Trail between Paris and Brantford, the Norfolk Sunrise Trail through Simcoe, and part of the Waterford Heritage Trail.

== Status ==
As of 2019, many destinations and former rail hubs along the line, such as Waterford, Simcoe and Port Dover, have no rail connection whatsoever, and many locations along the line are no longer served by public transit in any form. There is no direct transit connection from Galt to Brantford, and trips between these locations would require passing through Kitchener, Mississauga, and Hamilton on local buses and GO Transit. Waterloo Region's Ion rapid transit system, which began service in 2019, is planned to be extended from Kitchener's Fairway station to the Ainslie St. Transit Terminal in Galt, a route which is evocative of the Grand River Railway and the interurban era, though it uses modern Bombardier Flexity Freedom light rail vehicles. Currently there are no plans for any extension of this service south of Galt. Brantford still receives intercity passenger rail service from Via Rail Corridor trains along Canadian National's Dundas Subdivision, while Galt, once a major railway hub, has no passenger rail service whatsoever, though it still sees freight traffic on the intact Canadian Pacific Galt Subdivision.

== See also ==
- Brantford and Hamilton Electric Railway
- List of Ontario railways
- History of rail transport in Canada
- Rail transport in Ontario
- List of defunct Canadian railways
