= Hydro-Electric Railways =

Radial railway operator in Ontario, Canada

Hydro-Electric Railways, a subsidiary of the Hydro-Electric Power Commission of Ontario (HEPC or HEPCO), was an operator of radial railways in the province of Ontario, Canada. Its parent agency, the Hydro-Electric Power Commission of Ontario, would later evolve into Ontario Hydro and, later, Hydro One.

The Ontario Legislative Assembly granted the commission authority to operate electric interurban railways in the territory served by the commission in the Hydro-Electric Railway Act, 1914. Changes in government policy and public sentiment in the 1920s restricted their development, and all such operations ceased in the 1930s (with the exception of the Hamilton Street Railway streetcar system, which continued until 1946).

== Lines ==
The following properties were operated by the Hydro-Electric Railways:

Railway	Years under Hydro	Notes
Brantford and Hamilton Electric Railway	1930-1931	
Guelph Radial Railway	1926-1937	owned by Hydro-Electric Railways
Hamilton, Grimsby & Beamsville Electric Railway	1930-1931	
Hamilton Street Railway	1930-1946	
Sandwich, Windsor and Amherstburg Railway	1930-1934	Windsor area
Toronto and York Radial Railway	1921-1927	
Windsor, Essex and Lake Shore Rapid Railway	1929-1932	Windsor area

With the exception of the Guelph Radial Railway, Ontario Hydro managed radial lines owned by municipalities.

== Promotion of radials ==
In 1912, Adam Beck, founder and chairman of Ontario Hydro, began to promote the creation and operation of electric interurban railways in the territory served by the Hydro-Electric Power Commission of Ontario. The Hydro-Electric Railways were a vehicle to promote his vision for radials.

=== Proposal for a provincial radial network ===
Electric railways consumed a huge amount of electrical power, and Beck saw their development as an opportunity to sell electricity. Beck envisioned that radials would share the right-of-ways of Hydro transmission lines. A provincial radial system would bridge gaps between various separate radial systems such as those in Toronto, Hamilton and the Niagara Peninsula.

Beck piloted the Hydro Electric Railway Act of 1914. This repealed the requirement that municipalities bear all costs of radial construction, but allowed Ontario Hydro to develop co-operative agreements between Hydro and municipalities for radial construction. Only projects with the potential to be self-supporting would be considered, and municipalities would bear any deficits.

With the new Canadian National Railways consuming considerable taxpayer money, critics feared costs to build radials could escalate. There was also a boost in automobile and truck traffic after World War I. The 1919 provincial election brought into power the United Farmers of Ontario party which was extremely skeptical of Beck's plan. In 1921, Premier Charles Drury announced that the province would not guarantee radial bonds, thus killing the radial scheme.

=== Proposal for a Toronto waterfront entrance ===
In 1922, Beck made a proposal to the City of Toronto to build a high-speed, 4- or 6-track radial entrance to the city via the waterfront. There were objections to the radials crossing the grounds of the Canadian National Exhibition and fears of a detrimental impact on waterfront economic development. In January 1923, voters rejected the radial proposal.

Despite the decline of the interurban industry, Beck continued his advocacy for radials until his death in 1925 which ended Ontario Hydro's efforts to promote radials.

== See also ==
- Adam Beck
- Canadian National Electric Railways was another organization intended to promote radials.
