= Box motor =

Self-propelled box cars

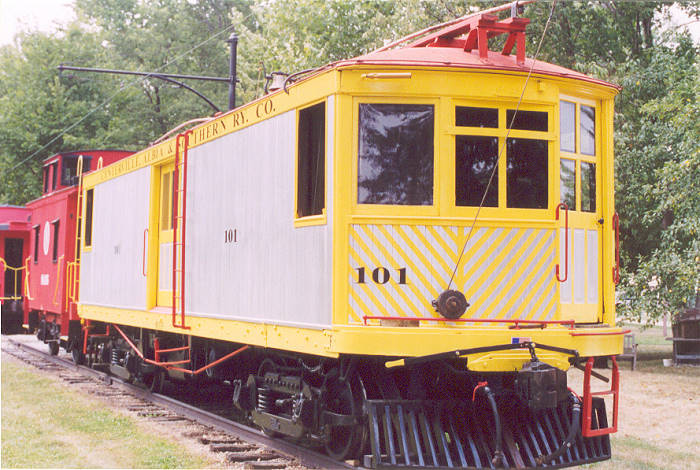
A preserved box motor from Iowa.

A box motor, in railroad terminology, is a self-propelled boxcar, normally powered by electricity and running on an interurban railway or a streetcar line. Many box motors were converted from passenger cars on the systems that ran them, with the seats and most of the windows removed and large freight doors fitted. They were generally used for express and less-than-carload freight.

== See also ==
- Boxcab
