= List of rail yards =

This article is a list of important rail yards in geographical order, including hump yards, freight handling yards, and intermodal (container) terminals. These yards may be called classification, freight, marshalling, shunting, or switching yards, which are cultural terms generally meaning the same thing.

The listed yards fall into at least one of the following categories:

- Important yards for the formation of freight/goods trains
- Yards with a large volume of traffic
- Yards with very extensive track systems

== Notes ==
- Names of the nearest cities etc. are presented in the common usage, and shown first followed by a colon, unless the specific yard name is known (which will be presented in the form native to their country. possibly transliterated)
- If known, the number of tracks are shown in brackets, with two numbers e.g. (xx + xx) for yards with 'up' and 'down' lines.
- Yards marked with a star (asterisk) may no longer be in use.
- The nearest city or town is given first: if the yard has a well known name that differs.

== North America ==
=== Canada ===
From west to east

- Nanaimo, British Columbia
  - Wellcox Yard (SVI, Marshalling, Barge operation by Seaspan ULC)
- Vancouver, British Columbia
  - Port Coquitlam Yard (CPKC, Intermodal and Marshalling)
  - VIF Intermodal (CPKC, Intermodal)
  - Williston Yard (CPKC, Intermodal, Grain)
  - Thornton Yard (CN, Intermodal and Marshalling)
  - North Vancouver Yard (CN, Marshalling)
  - Lulu Island Yard (CN, Marshalling)
  - Trapp Yard (SRY, Marshalling)
  - New Westminster Terminal (BNSF, Marshalling)
  - Glen Yard (BNSF, Marshalling)
  - Main Yard (BNSF, Marshalling)
  - Vancouver Reliability Center (VIA, Coach Yard & Shop)
- Kamloops, British Columbia
  - Kamloops CP Yard (CPKC, Marshalling)
  - Kamloops CN Yard (CN, Intermodal and Marshalling)
- Golden, British Columbia
  - Golden Yard (CPKC, Marshalling, Coal Staging Yard)
- Trail, British Columbia
  - Tadanac Yard (CPKC, Marshalling)
- Cranbrook, British Columbia
  - Cranbrook yard (CPKC, Marshalling)
- Edmonton, Alberta
  - Bissell Yard (CN, Marshalling)
  - Cloverbar Yard (CN, Marshalling)
  - Dunvegan Yard (CN, Railcar Storage)
  - Scotford Yard (CN, Marshalling)
  - Scotford Yard (CPKC, Marshalling)
  - Sturgeon Terminal (Cando Rail & Terminals, Storage & FMLM services)
  - Lambton Park Yard (CPKC, Marshalling)
  - D.L. MacDonald Yard (ETS)
  - McBain Yard (CN, Intermodal)
  - Strathcona Yard (CPKC, Intermodal and Marshalling)
  - Walker Yard (CN, Marshalling)
- Calgary, Alberta
  - Alyth Yard (CPKC, Marshalling)
  - Ogden Park (CPKC headquarters campus,)
  - Shepard Yard (CPKC, Intermodal)
  - Manchester Yard (CPKC, Marshalling, Storage)
  - Keith Yard (CPKC, Marshalling, Storage)
  - Sarcee Yard (CN, Intermodal and Marshalling)
  - Calgary Logistics Park (CN, Marshalling, Intermodal, industry servicing)
  - Anderson Garage (Calgary Transit)
  - Oliver Bowen Maintenance Centre (Calgary Transit)
- Lethbridge, Alberta
  - Kipp Yard (CPKC, Marshalling)
  - Churchill Industrial Yard (CPKC, Marshalling)
- Medicine Hat, Alberta
  - Medicine Hat Yard (CPKC, Marshalling)
  - Dunmore Yard (CPKC, Marshalling)
- Moose Jaw, Saskatchewan
  - Moose Jaw Yard (CPKC, Marshalling)
- Regina, Saskatchewan
  - Regina Yard (CPKC, Intermodal and Marshalling)
  - Warell Yard (CN, Marshalling)
- Saskatoon, Saskatchewan
  - Chappell Yard (CN, Intermodal and Marshalling)
  - Sutherland Yard (CPKC, Intermodal and Marshalling)
- Melville, Saskatchewan
  - Melville Yard (CN, Marshalling)
- Winnipeg, Manitoba
  - Burlington Northern Santa Fe Manitoba Yard (BNSF Manitoba)
  - East Yard (CN, now the Forks)*
  - Fort Rouge Yard (CN)
    - Via Rail Winnipeg Maintenance Centre (Via Rail)
  - Greater Winnipeg Water District St. Boniface Yard (GWWDR)
  - North Transcona Yard (CPKC)
    - Central Manitoba Railway Yard (CEMR)
  - St. Boniface Yard (CPKC)
  - Symington Yard (CN, Intermodal and Hump Yard)
  - Transcona Yard (CN)
  - Winnipeg Yard (CPKC, Intermodal and Hump Yard)
    - Weston Shops
- Thunder Bay, Ontario
  - Thunder Bay Yard (CPKC, Intermodal, Marshalling and Grain Staging)
  - Neebing Yard (CN, Marshalling)
- Sudbury, Ontario
  - Sudbury Yard (CPKC, Marshalling)
  - Capreol Yard (CN, Marshalling)
- Cambridge, Ontario
  - Hagey Yard (CPKC)
- Toronto, Ontario
  - Toronto Yard sometimes referred to as Agincourt Yard (CPKC, Marshalling, Former Hump Yard, Automotive compound)
  - Don Yard (GO Transit layover facility, ex-CN Don Sorting Yard)
  - North Bathurst Yard (GO Transit layover facility)
  - Vaughan Intermodal Terminal (CPKC, Intermodal)
  - MacMillan Yard (CN, Hump Yard)
  - Brampton Intermodal Terminal (CN, Intermodal)
  - Lambton/West Toronto Yards (CPKC, Marshalling)
  - CPR Parkdale Yard (ex-CVR 1871–1883/ex-CPR 1883-1890s, marshalling and repair yards, closed and removed mid 1980s)
  - Willowbrook Rail Maintenance Facility (GO Transit facility, ex-CN Mimico Yard, current Willowbrook Yard)
  - Whitby Rail Maintenance Facility (GO Transit facility)
  - Via Toronto Maintenance Centre (Via Rail Passenger Yard, former CN Mimico Yard)
  - Oakville Yard (CN, Marshalling)
  - Aldershot Yard (CN, Marshalling)
- Hamilton, Ontario
  - CPR Aberdeen Yard (CPKC, Marshalling)
  - Stuart St. Yard (CN/SOR, Marshalling)
  - Parkdale Yard (CN/SOR, Marshalling)
- London, Ontario
  - Quebec St. Yard (CPKC, Marshalling)
  - London Yard (CN, Marshalling)
- Sarnia, Ontario
  - Sarnia Yard (CN, Marshalling)
- Englehart, Ontario (ONR, Marshalling)
- Ottawa, Ontario
  - Walkley Yard (CN, Marshalling)
- Montreal, Quebec
  - Taschereau Yard (CN, Intermodal and Marshalling – former hump)
  - St-Luc Yard (CPKC, Marshalling, –former hump)
  - Lachine IMS Yard (CPKC, Intermodal)
  - Hochelaga Yard (CPKC, Intermodal – abandoned)
  - Turcot (CN, Intermodal – Abandoned)
  - Outremont Yard (CPKC, Marshalling – abandoned)
  - Longue-Pointe Yard (CN, Marshalling – abandoned
  - Glenn yard ( CPKC, Marshalling – abandoned)
  - Carrière yard, (CN, Marshalling)
  - Pointe St-Charles Yard (CN Marshalling)
  - Montreal-East Yard (CN, Marshalling)
  - Rivière-des-Prairies (CN, Marshalling)
  - Montréal Maintenance Centre (Via Rail, Passenger and maintenance)
- Farnham, Quebec (CPKC, Marshalling)
- Longueuil, Québec
- Southwark Yard (CN, Marshalling)
- Trois-Rivières, Quebec (CFQG, Marshalling)
- Saint-Georges de Champlain, Quebec
  - Garneau Yard (CN, Marshalling)
- Quebec City, Quebec
  - Joffre Yard (CN, Marshalling)
  - Sainte-Foy (CN, Storage)
  - Henri-IV Yard (CFQG, Marshalling)
  - Limoilou (CN/CFC, Marshalling)
- Mont-Joli, Quebec (CN, Marshalling)
- Saguenay, Québec (CN/RS, Marshalling)
- La Tuque, Quebec
  - Fitzpatrick Yard (CN, Marshalling)
- Richmond, Quebec (CN/SLQ, Marshalling)
- Moncton, New Brunswick
  - Gordon Yard (CN, Marshalling)
- Saint John, New Brunswick
  - Island Yard (CN/NBSR, Marshalling/Intermodal)
  - Dever Rd. Yard (NBSR, Marshalling)
- Halifax, Nova Scotia
  - Rockingham Yard (CN, Marshalling)
- Truro, Nova Scotia (CN/CBNS, Marshalling)
- Stellarton, Nova Scotia (CBNS, Marshalling)

=== United States ===
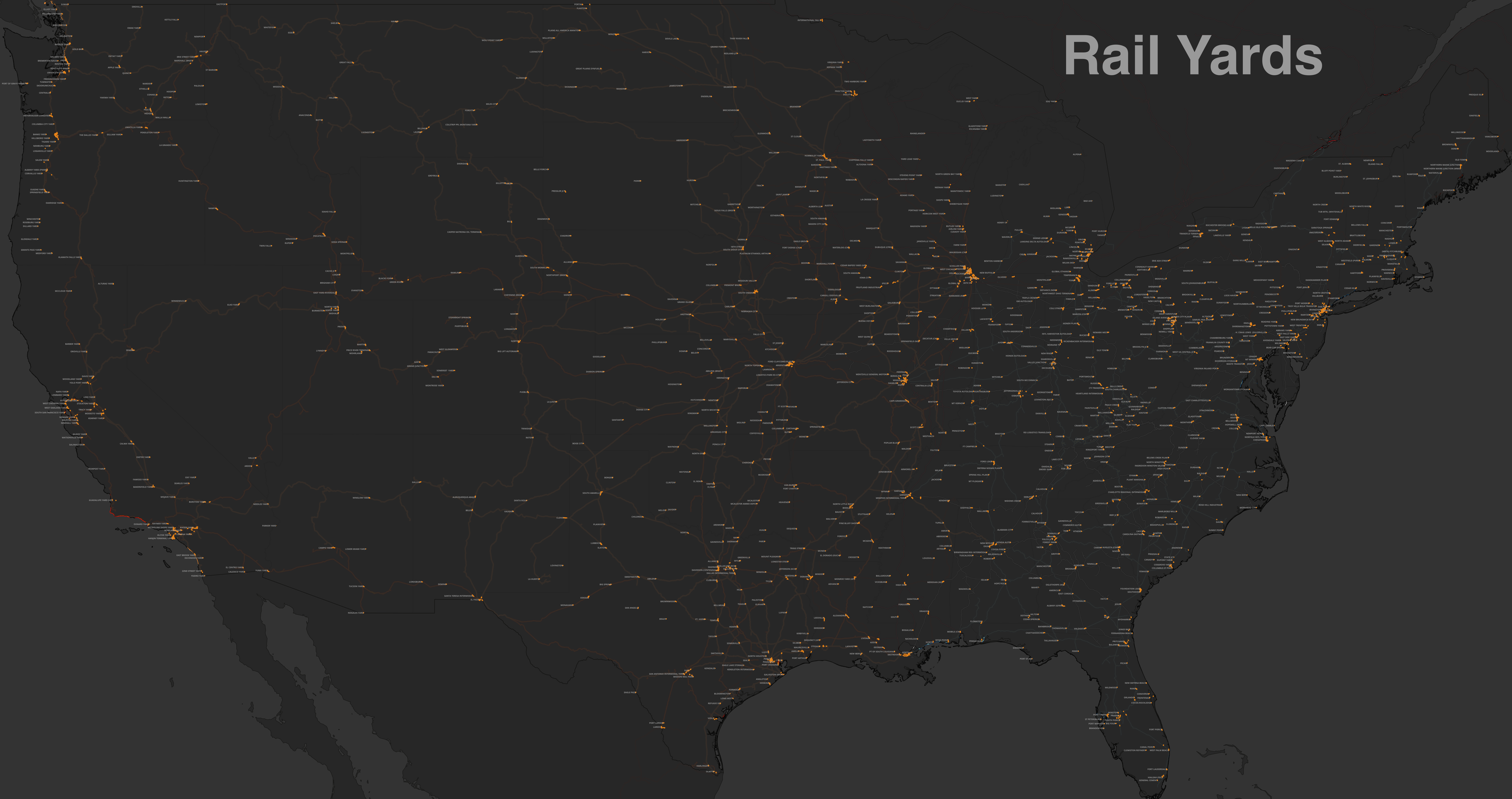
Rail yards in the United States

By state in alphabetical order:

==== Alabama ====
- Birmingham:
  - Boyles Yard (CSXT)
  - East Thomas Yard (BNSF Railway)
- Decatur: Oakworth Yard (CSXT)
- Fairfield: Ensley Yard (Birmingham Southern Railroad)
- Irondale: Norris Yard (Norfolk Southern Railway):)
- Mobile: Sibert Yard (CSXT)
- Muscle Shoals: Sheffield Yard [NS]

==== Arkansas ====
- North Little Rock: North Little Rock Yard (Union Pacific Railroad)
- Pine Bluff: Pine Bluff Yard (Union Pacific Railroad)
- Marion: Marion Intermodal Terminal (Union Pacific Railroad)
- Van Buren: Van Buren Yard (Union Pacific Railroad)

==== Arizona ====
- Glendale:
  - Phoenix Intermodal Facility (BNSF)
- Parker:
  - Arizona & California Parker Yard (ARZC)
- Phoenix:
  - Phoenix Yard (UP)
  - Phoenix Yard (BNSF)
- Tucson:
  - Tucson Yard (UP)
  - Port of Tucson (UP)
- Winslow:
  - Winslow Yard (BNSF)

==== California ====
- Bakersfield:
  - Bakersfield Yard (BNSF)
  - Bakersfield Yard (UP)
- Barstow:
  - Barstow Yard (BNSF)
- Camp Pendleton South:
  - Stuart Mesa Yard (NCTD)
- City of Industry:
  - Industry Yard (UP)
- Colton:
  - West Colton Yard (UP)
- Commerce:
  - East LA Intermodal Facility (UP)
  - Hobart Yard (BNSF)
  - The Weeds (UP)
- Corona:
  - Corona Yard (BNSF)
- Empire:
  - Modesto-Empire Yard (M&ET)
- Fresno:
  - Calwa Yard (BNSF)
  - Fresno Yard (UP)
- Fontana:
  - Kaiser Yard (BNSF)
  - Kaiser Yard (UP)
- Guadalupe:
  - Guadalupe Yard (UP)
- La Mirada:
  - La Mirada Yard (BNSF)
- Lathrop:
  - Lathrop Yard (UP)
- Long Beach:
  - ICTF (UP)
  - Mead Yard (UP)
  - Watson Yard (BNSF)
- Los Angeles:
  - LATC (UP)
  - Aurant Yard (UP)
  - 8th St. Yard (Amtrak)
  - Central Maintenance Facility (SCAX)
  - 4th Street Yard (UP)
  - J Yard (UP)
- Los Nietos:
  - Los Nietos Yard (UP)
- Milpitas:
  - Milpitas Yard
- Mira Loma:
  - Mira Loma Manifest Yard (UP)
  - Mira Loma Auto Facility (UP)
- Montclair:
  - Montclair Yard (UP)
- Needles:
  - Needles Yard (BNSF)
- Oakland:
  - Desert Yard (UP)
  - East Oakland Yard (UP)
  - West Oakland Yard (UP)
  - Oakland International Gateway (BNSF)
  - Oakland Maintenance Facility (Amtrak)
- Oxnard:
  - Oxnard Yard (UP)
- Pittsburg:
  - Pittsburg Yard (BNSF)
  - Pittsburg Yard (UP)
- Richmond:
  - Richmond Yard (BNSF)
- Roseville:
  - J.R. Davis Yard (largest on the west coast) (UP)
- San Bernardino:
  - San Bernardino Yard (BNSF)
- San Diego:
  - San Diego Yard (BNSF)
- San Jose:
  - Caltrain Centralized Equipment Maintenance & Operations Facility (JPBX)
- Riverbank:
  - Riverbank Yard (BNSF)
- Stockton:
  - Stockton Intermodal Facility - Mariposa Yard (BNSF)
  - Mormon Yard (BNSF)
  - Stockton Yard (UP)
  - Altamont Corridor Express Yard (ACE)
  - Port of Stockton (CCT)
- Van Nuys:
  - Gemco Yard (UP)
- Vernon:
  - Malabar Yard (BNSF)
  - River Yard (LAJ)
- Watsonville:
  - Watsonville Yard (UP)
- Yermo:
  - Yermo Yard (UP)

==== Colorado ====
  - Denver:
    - 36th Street Yard (UP)
    - Globeville Yard (BNSF)
    - North Yard (former DRGW, UP)
    - Rennix Yard (BNSF, Intermodal)
  - Pueblo: Pueblo Yard (BNSF, UP)

==== Connecticut ====
  - New Haven: Cedar Hill Yard (CSXT/Providence and Worcester/Connecticut Southern/Amtrak)
  - Hartford: Hartford Yard (Connecticut Southern/Pan Am Railways)

==== Delaware ====
  - Wilmington: Edgemoor Yard (NS)
  - Wilmington: Wilsmere Yard (CSXT)

==== District of Columbia ====
  - Washington: Ivy City Yard (Amtrak)
  - Washington: Benning Yard (CSXT)

==== Florida ====
  - Baldwin: Baldwin Yard (CSXT)
  - Bradenton: Tropicana Yard (CSXT)
  - Fort Pierce: Fort Pierce Yard (Florida East Coast)
  - Jacksonville:
    - Bowden Yard (FEC)
    - Duval Yard (CSXT)
    - Moncrief Yard (CSX, EX SBD)
    - Simpson Yard (NS)
  - Lakeland: Winston Yard (CSXT)
  - Mulberry:
    - Mulberry Yard (CSXT)
    - New Wales Yard (CSXT)
  - New Smyrna Beach: New Smyrna Beach Yard (Florida East Coast)
  - Miami:
    - Hialeah Yard (Florida East Coast)
    - Hialeah Yard (CSXT/Tri-Rail/Amtrak)
  - Orlando: Taft Yard (CSXT)
  - Tampa:
    - Rockport Yard (CSXT)
    - Uceta Yard (CSXT)
    - Yeoman Yard (CSXT)
    - Hookers Point Yard (CSXT)
  - Tallahassee: Tallahassee Yard (FGA)
  - Winter Haven: Central Florida Intermodal Logistics Center (CSXT)
  - Wildwood: Wildwood Yard (CSXT)
  - Winston: Winston Terminal (CSXT)

==== Georgia ====
  - Albany:
    - Atlantic Coast Line Yard (GFRR)
    - Albany Central of Georgia Yard (NS)
  - Atlanta:
    - Tilford Yard (CSXT)
    - Hulsey Yard (CSXT)
    - Inman Yard (NS)
    - North Avenue Yards (former)
    - Howell Interlocking (CSXT)
  - Austell: John W. Whitaker Intermodal Terminal (Norfolk Southern Railway)
  - Fairburn: Fairburn Yard (CSXT)
  - Macon: Brosnan Yard (NS)
  - Rome: Forestville Yard (NS)
  - Savannah:
    - Dillard Yard (NS)
    - Southover Yard (CSXT)
    - Savannah Intermodal Yard (CSXT)
  - Valdosta: Langdale Yard (NS)
  - Waycross: Waycross Rice Yard (CSXT)

==== Idaho ====
  - Bonner's Ferry: Bonner's Ferry Yard (UP)
  - Eastport: Eastport Yard (UP/CPKC)
  - Hauser: Hauser Yard (BNSF/MRL)
  - Idaho Falls: Idaho Falls Yard (UP/EIRR)
  - Minidoka: Minidoka Yard (UP/EIRR)
  - Nampa: Nampa Yard (UP/BVRR)
  - Plummer: Plummer Yard (STMA/UP)
  - Pocatello: Pocatello Yard (UP)
  - Sandpoint: Boyer Yard (BNSF/UP/POVA)
  - St Marie's: St Maries Yard (STMA)
  - Twin Falls: Twin Falls Yard (former UP interchange yard), Now Eastern Idaho Railroad headquarters (Watco)

==== Illinois ====
  - Centralia:
    - Centralia Terminal (CN)
    - Centralia Yard (BNSF)
  - Champaign: Champaign Yard (CN)
  - Chicago area
    - 14th Street Coach Yards (Metra, Amtrak)
    - 47th Street Yard (NS, intermodal)
    - 59th Street Yard (CSXT, intermodal, switched by Chicago Rail Link)
    - Ashland Avenue Yard (NS, carload freight)
    - Aurora (Metra commuter coach yard for BNSF route)
    - Barr Yard (CSXT)
    - Bedford Park Yard (CSXT, intermodal, switched by Chicago Rail Link)
    - Bensenville Yard (CPKC)
    - Blue Island Yard (Indiana Harbor Belt)
    - Burnham Yard (South Shore Freight)
    - Burr Oak Yard (Iowa Interstate / Chicago Rail Link)
    - California Ave Coach Yards (UP)
    - Calumet Yard (NS)
    - Clearing Yard (BRC, Hump Yard, Intermodal. Marshalling)
    - Cicero Yard (BNSF, intermodal)
    - Commercial Avenue Yard (BRC)
    - Corwith Yards (BNSF, Intermodal)
    - East Joliet Yard (Elgin, Joliet & Eastern, now CN)
    - Eola Yard (BNSF)
    - Glenn Yard (CN)
    - Global I (UP, intermodal)
    - Global II (UP, intermodal)
    - Global IV (UP, intermodal)
    - Homewood (Harvey): Markham Yard (CN)
    - Irondale Yard (Chicago Rail Link)
    - Landers Yard (NS, intermodal)
    - Logistics Park (BNSF, intermodal)
    - Proviso Yard (UP Hump Yard, Intermodal, Marshalling)
    - Schiller Park Yard (CN)
    - South Chicago Yard (South Chicago & Indiana Harbor Railroad)
    - Western Avenue (Metra commuter coach yards, formerly two separate yards, C&NW, now UP, Milwaukee Road)
    - Willow Springs (BNSF, intermodal)
    - Yard Center (UP)
  - Decatur:
    - Brush Yard/Decatur Terminal (NS)
    - North Yard (NS)
    - Decatur Yard (D&EI)
  - East Peoria:
    - East Peoria Yard (TZPR)
    - East Peoria Yard (Toledo, Peoria & Western)
  - Saint Louis Area:
    - East Saint Louis: Gateway Yard (64)(Alton and Southern Railway – Hump Yard)
    - Roselake Yard (CSXT)
    - Madison: Madison Yard (TRRA)
    - Coapman Yard (NS)
    - East St. Louis Yard (CPKC)
    - Valley Junction Yard (UP)
    - Madison Yard (UP)
    - Dupo yard (UP)
  - Galesburg: Galesburg Yard (BNSF– Hump Yard)
  - Havana: Quiver Yard (Illinois & Midland Railroad)
  - Kankakee: Kankakee Yard (NS)
  - Ottawa: Fremont Street Yard (IR)
  - Pekin: Powerton Yard (Illinois & Midland Railroad)
  - Rochelle: Global III (UP Intermodal)
  - Silvis: Silvis Yard (Iowa Interstate)
  - Springfield: Shops Yard (Illinois & Midland Railroad)
  - Villa Grove: Villa Grove Yard (UP)

==== Indiana ====
  - Burns Harbor: Burns Harbor Yard (NS)
  - Elkhart: Elkhart Yard (72+15) (NS)
  - Evansville: Howell Yard (CSXT)
  - Fort Wayne:
    - East Wayne Yard (NS)
    - Piqua Yard (NS)
  - Gary: Kirk Yard (Elgin, Joliet & Eastern, now CN)
  - Hammond: Gibson Yard (Indiana Harbor Belt)
  - Indianapolis:
    - Avon Yard (CSXT)
    - Hawthorne Yard (CSXT)
    - Beech Grove Yard and Shops (Amtrak)
    - Senate Avenue Yard (INRD)
  - Lafayette:
    - East Yard (NS)
    - South Yard (NS)
    - Lafayette Terminal (CSXT)
  - Jeffersonville: Jeff Yard (Louisville & Indiana)
  - Anderson: South Anderson Yard (CSXT)
  - Muncie: Muncie East Yard (NS)

==== Iowa ====
  - Council Bluffs: Council Bluffs Yard (Iowa Interstate & Union Pacific)
  - Davenport: Nahant Yard (CPKC)
  - Des Moines: Short Line Yard (UP)
  - Mason City: Mason City Yard (CPKC)
  - South Amana: South Amana (Iowa Interstate)
  - Waterloo: Waterloo Yard (CN)
  - Boone: Boone Yard (UP)

==== Kansas ====
  - Coffeyville: Coffeyville Yard (UP)
  - Emporia: Emporia Yard (BNSF)
  - Gardner: Logistics Park (BNSF)
  - Kansas City: Argentine Yard (BNSF)
  - Kansas City: Armourdale Yard (UP)
  - Kansas City: Mill Street Yard (KCT, formerly Gateway Western Railroad), Now Kaw River RR (Watco)
  - Newton: Sand Creek Yard (BNSF)
  - Topeka: Topeka Yard (UP)

==== Kentucky ====
  - Louisville:
    - Appliance Park Yard (NS)
    - Prime F. Osborn Yard (CSXT)
    - Youngtown Yard (NS)
    - Oak Street Yard (Paducah & Louisville)
    - South Louisville Rail Yard (Louisville & Nashville, closed 1990s)
  - Paducah: Paducah Yard (PAL)
  - Danville: Danville Yard (NS)
  - Madisonville: Atkinson Yard (CSXT)
  - Georgetown: Delaplain Yard (NS)
  - Ludlow: Ludlow Yard (NS)
  - Russell: Russell Yard (CSXT)
  - Corbin: Corbin Yard (CSXT)
  - Taylor Mill: DeCoursey Yard (CSXT, Progress Rail)
  - Shelbyville: Shelbyville Auto Terminal (NS)

==== Louisiana ====
  - Alexandria:
    - Alexandria Yard (CPKC)
    - Alexandria Yard (UP)
  - Baton Rouge area:
    - Addis Yard (UP)
    - Baton Rouge Yard (CN)
    - Baton Rouge Yard (CPKC)
    - Geismar Yard (CN)
  - Lafayette:
    - Lafayette North Yard (BNSF)
    - Lafayette South Yard (BNSF)
  - Lake Charles area:
    - Edgerly Plastic Yard (UP)
    - Lake Charles Yard (UP)
  - Livonia: Livonia Yard (UP)
  - New Orleans area:
    - Avondale Yard (BNSF and UP)
    - Destrahan Yard (CN)
    - France Yard (NOPB)
    - Gentilly Yard (CSXT)
    - Mays Yard (CN)
    - New Orleans Yard (CPKC)
    - Oliver Yard (NS)
  - Shreveport, Louisiana area:
    - Deramus Yard (CPKC)
    - Hollywood Yard (UP)

==== Maine ====
  - Auburn:
    - Danville Junction (Pan Am Railways, St. Lawrence and Atlantic Railroad)
    - Lewiston Junction (St. Lawrence and Atlantic Railroad)
  - Bangor: Bangor Yard (Pan Am Railways)
  - Brownville: Brownville Junction (Eastern Maine Railway, Canadian Pacific Railway)
  - Brunswick: Brunswick Yard (Pan Am Railways, Amtrak, Maine Department of Transportation)
  - Hermon: Northern Maine Junction (Pan Am Railways, Canadian Pacific Railway)
  - Mattawamkeag: Mattawamkeag Yard (Pan Am Railways, Eastern Maine Railway)
  - Millinocket: Millinocket Yard (Maine Northern Railway, Canadian Pacific Railway)
  - Portland:
    - Yard 8 (Pan Am Railways, Maine International Marine Terminal)
    - Yard 10 (Pan Am Railways, Amtrak)
    - Yard 11 (Pan Am Railways)
  - Rockland: Rockland Yard (Maine Department of Transportation)
  - Rumford: Rumford Yard (Pan Am Railways)
  - South Portland:
    - Rigby Yard (CSX)
    - Yard 3 (Pan Am Railways, Turner's Island Railroad)
    - Yard 6 (Pan Am Railways)
  - Waterville: Waterville Shops (Pan Am Railways)
  - Westbrook: Yard 12 (Pan Am Railways)

==== Maryland ====
  - Baltimore
    - Bayview Yards (CSXT and NS)
    - Canton/Coal Yard (NS)
    - Curtis Bay Yard (CSX)
    - Locust Point Yard (CSX)
    - Penn Mary Yard (CTN)
  - Brunswick, MD: Brunswick Yard (CSX)
  - Cumberland: Cumberland Yard (CSXT)
  - Hagerstown:
    - Hagerstown Terminal (CSXT)
    - Vardo Yard (NS)

==== Massachusetts ====
  - Boston:
    - Beacon Park Yard (CSXT, closed 2013)
    - Boston Engine Terminal (MBTA)
    - Southampton Street Yard (MBTA/Amtrak)
    - Readville (CSXT)
  - Elsewhere in Massachusetts
    - Ayer: Hill Yard (CSXT/B&E)
    - East Deerfield (B&E)
    - Fitchburg (B&E)
    - Framingham: North Yard / Nevins Yards (CSXT)
    - Gardner (B&E/PW)
    - Lawrence (CSXT)
    - Lowell (CSXT)
    - Palmer (NECR/MCER/CSXT)
    - West Springfield (CSXT/CSOR)
    - Worcester (CSXT/PW)
    - Various Grafton & Upton yards

==== Michigan ====
  - Battle Creek: Battle Creek Yard (CN)
  - Detroit:
    - Livernois Yard—aka Junction Yard (Conrail Shared Assets: CSXT and NS)
    - Dearborn: Rougemere Yard (CSXT)
    - North Yard (CSAO)
    - River Rouge: River Rouge Yard (CSAO)
    - Oakwood Yard (NS)
    - Tecumseh Yard (CSAO)
    - Shaefer Yard (CN)
  - Grand Rapids: Hugart Yard (GDLK; Took over for NS in 2009)
    - Wyoming Yard (CSXT)
  - Flint:
    - Bristol Yard (CN)
    - McGrew Yard (LSRC; took over for CSXT in 2019)
  - Flat Rock: Flat Rock Yard (CN)
  - Kalamazoo: Gearhart Yard (GDLK; Took over for NS in 2009)
  - Lansing: Cory Yard (CN)
  - Pontiac: Pontiac Yard (CN)
  - Saginaw: Saginaw Yard (LSRC)

==== Minnesota ====
  - Dilworth: Dilworth Yard (BNSF)
  - Duluth:
    - Proctor Yard (CN)
    - Rice's Point Yard (BNSF)
    - Rice's Point Yard (CPKC)
  - Minneapolis:
    - Humboldt Yard (CPKC)
    - Northtown Yard (55) (BNSF)
    - Shoreham Yards (CPKC)
  - Northfield: Northfield Yard (UP, CP, PGR)
  - Ranier: Ranier Yard (CN)
  - St. Paul:
    - Midway Yard (Minnesota Commercial)
    - Pig's Eye Yard (CPKC)
    - Hoffman Yard (UP)
  - Shakopee: Valley Park Yard (UP)
  - South St. Paul: South St. Paul Yard (UP)
  - Virginia: Virginia Yard (CN)
  - Waseca: Waseca Yard (CPKC)

==== Missouri ====
  - Kansas City:
    - Neff Yard (42) (UP) Closed October 2019.
    - Knoche/Joint Agency Yard (CPKC)
    - Kansas City SmartPort (CPKC, intermodal, autos)
    - North Kansas City Avondale Yard (NS)
    - Voltz Yard (NS, intermodal, autos)
  - North Kansas City: Murray Yard (BNSF bulk commodities marshaling terminal; former hump)
  - St. Louis:
    - Chouteau Yard (BNSF)
    - Luther Yard (NS)
    - Lesperance Yard (UP)
    - Lindenwood Yard (BNSF)
  - Moberly: Moberly Yard (NS)
  - Springfield:
    - North Springfield Yard (BNSF)
    - South Springfield Yard (BNSF)
    - Springfield Yard (BNSF)
  - West Quincy: West Quincy Yard (BNSF)

==== Nebraska ====
  - Lincoln:
    - Havelock Yard (BNSF)
    - Lincoln: Hobson Yard (BNSF)
  - North Platte: Bailey Yard (64+50) (The largest yard in the world) (UP)
  - Omaha: Gibson Yard (BNSF)
  - Alliance: Alliance Terminal (BNSF)

==== Nevada ====
  - Elko: Elko Yard (UP)
  - Las Vegas: Arden Yard (UP)
  - Sparks: Sparks Yard (UP)
  - Winnemucca: Winnemucca Yard (UP)

==== New Hampshire ====
  - Berlin: Berlin Yard (St. Lawrence and Atlantic Railroad)
  - Concord: Concord Yard (New England Southern Railroad, New Hampshire Central Railroad)
  - Conway: North Conway Depot and Railroad Yard (Conway Scenic Railroad)
  - Dover: Dover Yard (Pan Am Railways, New Hampshire Northcoast Railroad)
  - Nashua: Nashua Yard (Pan Am Railways)

==== New Jersey ====
  - Camden: Pavonia Yard (32) (Conrail Shared Assets: CSXT & NS)
  - Jersey City:
    - Croxton Yard (NS)
    - Greenville Yard (Port Jersey)
  - Kearny: South Kearney Terminal (CSXT)
  - Kearny: Meadows Maintenance Complex (NJT)
  - Linden Yard (SIR)
  - Little Ferry Yard (CSXT, NYSW, Conrail)
  - Newark: Oak Island Yard (CSXT and NS)
  - North Bergen Yard (CSXT and NYSW)

==== New York ====
  - Albany – Kenwood Yard (CPKC)
  - Binghamton – East Binghamton/Conklin Yard (NS)
  - Middle Yard (NS)
  - Bevier Street Yard (NS)
  - Buffalo:
    - Bison Yard (NS)
    - Black Rock Rail Yard (CN)
    - Creek Yard (B&P)
    - Frontier Yard (CSXT)
    - Tifft Yard (NS)
  - East Syracuse: De Witt Yard (CSXT)
  - Mechanicville (NS Intermodal, B&E)(Former Pan Am Southern)
  - New York City
    - Arlington Yard (Staten Island Railway)
    - High Bridge Facility (Metro-North Passenger and Maintenance Yard)
    - Hillside Facility (LIRR Passenger Yard)
    - Oak Point Yard (CSXT Marshalling)
    - Sunnyside Yard (Amtrak, NJ Transit Passenger Yard)
    - West Side Yard (LIRR Passenger Yard)
  - Niagara Falls: Niagara Falls Yard (CSX)
  - Rochester:
    - Brooks Avenue Yard (Rochester and Southern RR)
    - Goodman Street Yard (CSXT)
  - Selkirk: Selkirk Yard (CSXT)
  - Saratoga Springs: Saratoga Springs Yard (CPKC)
  - Port of Oswego Authority: City of Oswego

==== North Carolina ====
  - Asheville: Asheville Yard (NS)
  - Charlotte:
    - Charlotte Yard (NS)
    - Pinoca Yard (CSXT)
  - Greensboro: Pamona Yard (NS)
  - Hamlet: Hamlet Yard (CSXT)
  - Linwood: Spencer Yard (NS)
  - Raleigh: Glenwood Yard (NS)
  - Rocky Mount: Rocky Mount Terminal (CSXT)
  - Winston-Salem: N. Winston Yard (NS)

==== North Dakota ====
  - Enderlin, North Dakota: Enderlin Yard (CPKC)
  - Grand Forks: Grand Forks Yard (BNSF)
  - Harvey, North Dakota: Harvey Yard (CPKC)
  - Mandan, North Dakota: Mandan Yard (BNSF)
  - Minot, North Dakota: Gavin Yard (BNSF)
  - Minot, North Dakota: Minot Yard (CPKC)

==== Ohio ====
- Akron: Brittain Yard (W&LE)
- Ashtabula:
  - Astabula Yard (CSX)
  - Harbor Terminal (NS)
- Bellevue: Moorman Yard (NS)
- Brewster: Brewster Yard (W&LE)
- Canton: Canton Yard (NS)
- Conneaut:
  - Conneaut Yard (NS)
  - Conneaut Ore Docks (CN)
- Cincinnati:
  - Berry Yard (NS)
  - June Street Yard (CSXT)
  - Queensgate Yard (CSXT)
  - Storrs Yard (CSXT)
  - Gest Street Yard (NS)
  - Oakley Yard (Indiana & Ohio)
- Cleveland:
  - Collinwood Yard (CSXT)
  - Rockport Yard (NS)
  - Clark Avenue Yard (CSXT)
  - Campbell Road Yard (NS)
- Columbus:
  - Buckeye Yard East Side Of Yard Intermodel(CSXT), (NS) Storage Only & Local Interchange w/ Camp Chase Industrial Railroad
  - Columbus Yard, Corr Road (CSXT)
  - Parsons Yard (CSXT)
  - Rickenbacker Intermodal Terminal (NS)
  - Watkins Yard (NS)
- Crestline: Crestline Yard (CSXT, CFE)
- Dayton:
  - Moraine Yard (NS)
  - Needmore Yard (CSXT)
- Fairfield: Wayne Yard (Closed, (CSXT)
- Fostoria: Blair Yard (NS)
- Hamilton: South Hamilton Yard (Closed 1988, (CSXT)
- Hamilton: Woods Yard (Closed 2013, (CSXT)
- Lima: South Lima Yard (CSXT)
- Macedonia: Motor Yard (NS)
- Mariemont: Clare Yard (CET), (NS)
- Middletown:
  - Reed Yard (AK Steel)
  - New Reeds Yard (NS)
- Minerva: Minerva Yard (OHCR)
- Mingo Junction: Mingo Yard (NS)
- Marion: Marion Yard (CSXT)
- Newark: Ohio Central Rail Yard Newark (OHCR)
- New Miami: New River Yard (CSXT)
- North Baltimore: North Baltimore Intermodal Yard (CSXT)
- North Excello: Lind Yard (CSXT)
- Norwalk: Hartland Yard (W&LE)
- Norwood: McCullough Yard (Indiana & Ohio)
- Portsmouth: Portsmouth Yard (NS)
- Sharonville: Sharon Yard (NS)
- Sandusky:
  - Sandusky Yard (NS)
  - Sandusky Coal Docks (NS)
- Toledo:
  - Air Line Yard (NS)
  - Buck Yard & Toldeo Coal Docks (CSXT)
  - Homestead Yard (NS)
  - Lang Yard (CN)
  - Ottawa Yard (AAR)
  - Stanley Yard (CSXT)
  - Walbridge Yard (CSXT)
- Willard: Willard Yard (CSXT)
- Youngstown: Hazelton Yard (NS)

==== Oklahoma ====
  - Alva: Alva Yard (BNSF)
  - Oklahoma City:
    - Harter Yard (UP) (ex MKT)
    - North Yard (AKA East Yard) (WATCO) (ex- BNSF, BN, SLSF)
    - Nowers Yard (BNSF)
    - South Yard (AKA Flynn Yard) (BNSF) (ex- ATSF)
  - Owasso: Owasso Yard (SLWC/SKOL)
  - Tulsa: Cherokee Yard (BNSF, Hump)

==== Oregon ====
  - Eugene: Eugene Yard (CORP/UP) (ex-SP)
  - Hermiston: Hinkle Yard (UP)
  - Medford: Medford Yard (CORP) (ex-SP)
  - Klamath Falls
    - Klamath Falls Yard (UP) (ex-SP)
    - Klamath Falls Yard (BNSF) (ex-GN)
  - Portland
    - Albina Yard (UP)
    - Barnes Yard (UP)
    - Brooklyn Yard (UP) (ex-SP)
    - Willbridge Yard (BNSF)
    - Lake Yard (BNSF/UP/PTRC)
    - Terminal 6/East St. John (BNSF)
  - White City: White City Yard (CORP/RVT) (ex-SP/WCTR)
  - Winchester: Winchester Yard (CORP)

==== Pennsylvania ====
  - Aliquippa: Aliquippa Yard (CSX)
  - Allentown (NS)
  - Altoona: Rose Yard (NS)
  - Brownsville: Brownsville Coal Yard (NS)
  - Butler:
    - Calvin Yard (CN)
    - Butler Yard (B&P)
  - Chambersburg: Chambersburg Intermodal Yard (CSX)
  - Clearfield: Clearfield Yard (RJC)
  - Conway Yard (54+53) (NS)
  - Connellsville: Connellsville Yard (CSX)
  - DuBois: DuBois Yard (B&P)
  - Duryea yard (10+01) (RBMN)
  - Elrama: Shire Oaks Yard (NS Coal Yard)
  - Greencastle: Greencastle Intermodal Yard (NS)
  - Harrisburg area:
    - Enola Yard (79) (NS)
    - Harrisburg Yard (NS)
    - Rutherford Yard (NS)
  - Hollidaysburg: Hollidaysburg Yard (NS)
  - King of Prussia: Abrams Yard (NS)
  - Langhorne: Woodbourne Yard (CSXT)
  - Meadville: Meadville Yard (NS, WNYP)
  - Morrisville: Morrisville Yard (NS Intermodal)(NJT)
  - Newell: Newell Coal Yard (CSX)
  - Northumberland: Northumberland Yard (NS)
  - Reading: Spring Street Yard (NS)
  - New Castle: New Castle Yard (CSX)
  - Philadelphia:
    - 30th Street Yard (Amtrak)
    - Eastside Yard (CSX)
    - Greenwich Yard (CSX)
    - Powelton Yard (SEPTA)
    - Twin Oaks Auto Terminal (CSX)
    - Stoney Creek Yard (CSAO)
  - Pittsburgh:
    - Demmler Yard (CSX)
    - Dexter Yard (URR)
    - Duquesne Yard (URR)
    - Glenwood Yard (AVR)
    - Island Avenue Yard (NS)
    - North Bessemer Yard (CN, URR)
    - Pitcairn Yard (NS Intermodal)
    - Riverton Yard (CSX)
    - Rook Yard (W&LE)
    - Scully Yard (P&OC)
  - Punxsutawney: Riker Yard (B&P)
  - Scranton: Scranton Yard (DL/Steamtown)
  - Sharon: Ferrona Yard (NS)
  - Shenango: Shenango Yard (CN)
  - Taylor: Taylor Yard (NS)
  - York: Windsor Street Yard (NS)

==== Rhode Island ====
  - North Kingstown: West Davisville Yard (PW/Seaview Railroad)
  - North Kingstown: Mill Creek Yard (Seaview Railroad)
  - North Kingstown: Ocean State Yard (Seaview Railroad)
  - Cranston: Cranston Yard (PW)
  - Middletown: Melville Yard (Newport & Narragansett Bay / Old Colony and Newport)
  - Providence/Pawtucket: Northup Avenue Yard (Providence and Worcester/Amtrak/MBTA Commuter Rail)
  - Pawtucket: Darlington Yard (PW)
  - Valley Falls: Valley Falls Yard (PW)
  - Woonsocket: River Street Yard (PW)
  - Woonsocket: Winter Street Yard (PW, closed mid-2000’s)

==== Tennessee ====
  - Chattanooga:
    - DeButts Yard (60) (NS)
    - Wauhatchie Yard (CSXT)
  - Emory Gap: Emory Gap Yard (NS)
  - Etowah: Etowah Yard (CSXT)
  - Knoxville: John Sevier Yard (NS)
  - Memphis:
    - Leewood Yard (CSXT)
    - Tennessee Yard (BNSF)
    - Harrison (formerly Johnston) Yard (CN)
    - Rossville Intermodal Terminal (NS)
    - Sargent Yard (UP)
    - Harris Yard (NS)
  - Nashville:
    - Radnor Yard (CSXT)
    - Kayne Ave. Yard (CSXT)

==== Texas ====
  - Amarillo:
    - North Yard (BNSF)
    - South Yard (BNSF)
  - Arlington: Arlington Yard (UP)
  - Baytown: Coady Yard (UP)
  - Beaumont:
    - Beaumont Yard (UP)
    - Beaumont Yard (BNSF)
  - Corpus Christi: Viola Yard (UP)
  - Dallas:
    - Dallas Yard (UP)
    - Dallas Intermodal Terminal (UP)
  - Dayton: Robinson Yard (BNSF, UP)
  - El Paso:
    - Alfalfa Yard (UP)
    - El Paso Yard (BNSF)
  - Fort Worth:
    - Alliance Intermodal Facility (BNSF)
    - Davidson Yard (UP)
    - Ney Yard (UP)
    - Tower 55 (UP/BNSF)
  - Garland: Garland Yard (CPKC)
  - Hearne: Brazos Yard (UP)
  - Houston:
    - Booth Yard (UP)
    - Casey Yard (BNSF)
    - Eureka Yard (UP)
    - Congress Yard (UP)
    - Englewood Yard (UP)
    - Settegast Yard (UP)
    - North Yard (PTRA)
    - South Yard (UP)
    - New South Yard (BNSF)
    - Pearland Yard and Intermodal Facility (BNSF)
    - Manchester Yard (PTRA)
    - Strang Yard (UP)
    - Barbours Cut Intermodal Terminal (Port of Houston)
  - Kendleton: Kendleton Yard (CPKC)
  - Laredo:
    - Port Laredo Intermodal Facility (UP)
    - Laredo Yard (CPKC)
  - Longview: Longview Yard (UP)
  - Lubbock: Lubbock Yard (BNSF)
  - Mesquite: Mesquite Intermodal Facility (UP)
  - New Braunfels: Corbyn Yard (UP)
  - Saginaw: Saginaw Yard (BNSF)
  - San Antonio:
    - SoSan Yard (UP)
    - East Yard (UP)
    - Kirby Yard (UP)
    - San Antonio Intermodal Terminal (UP)
    - Cadet Yard (BNSF)
  - San Marcos: Jama Yard (UP)
  - Slaton: Slaton Yard (BNSF/South Plains Lamesa Railroad)
  - Spring: Lloyd Yard (UP)
  - Temple: Temple Yard (BNSF)
  - Wylie: Wylie Intermodal Terminal (CPKC)

==== Utah ====
  - Helper: Helper Yard (UP/Utah)
  - Midvale: Midvale Yard (BNSF/Utah Southern)
  - Provo: Provo Yard (UP/BNSF/Utah)
  - Ogden: Riverdale Yard (UP/Utah Central)
  - Salt Lake City:
    - North Yard (UP) (Closed April 2019)
    - Roper Yard (UP)

==== Virginia ====
  - Alexandria: Potomac Yard* (RF&P)
  - Norfolk: Lamberts Point Yard (NS, coal)
  - Chesapeake, Virginia:
    - Portlock Yard (NS, Intermodal, mixed freight)
    - Berkley Yard (Norfolk and Portsmouth Belt Line Railroad / CSXT) (mixed freight)
  - Crewe: Crewe Yard (NS)
  - Newport News: Newport News Coal Docks (CSXT)
  - Petersburg: Collier Yard (CSXT)
  - Virginia Beach, Virginia: Little Creek Yard (Buckingham Branch Railroad) (mixed freight)
  - Richmond:
    - Fulton Yard (CSXT)
    - Acca Yard (CSXT)
  - Roanoke, Virginia:
    - Roanoke Terminal (NS, coal mixed freight)
    - South Yard (NS)
  - Shenandoah: Shenandoah Yard (NS)

==== Washington ====
  - Auburn: Auburn Yard*
  - Centralia:
    - Centralia Yard (BNSF/UP/PSAP)
  - Cheney: Cheney Yard (BNSF/WER)
  - Coulee City: Coulee City Yard (WER)
  - Everett: Delta Yard (BNSF)
  - Fife: Fife Yard (UP)
  - Davenport: Davenport Yard (WER)
  - Kettle Falls: Kettle Falls Yard (STPP)
  - Longview:
    - Longview Junction (LVSW)
    - Longview (LVSW)
  - Marshal: (UP/BNSF/SSPR)
  - Newport: Newport Yard (POVA)
  - Pasco:
    - Pasco Yard (BNSF) (ex-NP)
    - Lampson Yard (BNSF)
  - Reardan: Reardan Yard (WER)
  - Seattle:
    - Argo Yard (UP)
    - Balmer Yard (BNSF)
    - South Seattle (BNSF)
    - Stacy Yard/Seattle Intermodal Gateway (BNSF)
  - Spokane:
    - East Spokane Yard (UP)
    - Erie Street Yard (BNSF/UP)
    - Hillyard Yard (BNSF) (ex-GN)
    - Yardley Yard (BNSF) (ex-NP
  - Tacoma: Tide Flats Yard (TMRW), Tacoma Yard (BNSF)
  - Usk: Usk Yard & Shops (POVA)
  - Vancouver: Vancouver Yard (BNSF) (ex-SP&S)
  - Warden: Warden Yard (BNSF)
  - Wishram: Wishram Yard (BNSF) (ex-SP&S)

==== West Virginia ====
  - Bluefield: Bluefield Yard (NS)
  - Danville: Danville Yard (CSXT)
  - Grafton: Grafton Yard (CSXT)
  - Keyser: Keyser Yard (CSXT)
  - Prichard: Prichard Yard (NS)
  - Williamson: Williamson Yard (NS)

==== Wisconsin ====
  - Altoona: Altoona Yard (UP)
  - Butler: Butler Yard (UP)
  - Fond du Lac: Shops Yard (CN)
  - Green Bay: Green Bay Yard (CN)
  - Janesville: Janesville Yard (WSOR)
  - La Crosse:
    - La Crosse Yard (BNSF)
    - La Crosse Yard (CPKC)
  - Madison: Madison Yard (WSOR)
  - Milwaukee:
    - Mitchell Street Yard (UP)
    - North Milwaukee Yard (WSOR)
    - Muskego Yard (CPKC)
    - National Avenue Yard (UP)
  - Neenah: Neenah Yard (CN)
  - Portage: Portage Yard (CPKC)
  - Stevens Point: Stevens Point Yard (CN)
  - Superior:
    - 28th Street Yard (BNSF)
    - Allouez Yard (BNSF)
    - Itasca Yard (UP)
    - Old Town Yard (BNSF)
    - Pokegama Yard (CN)
    - Stinson Yard (CPKC)
  - Wausau: Wausau Yard (CN)
  - Wisconsin Rapids: Wisconsin Rapids Yard (CN)

=== Mexico ===
- Estado de México
  - Tlalnepantla de Baz: Valle de México Patio Clasificación (48) (Ferrovalle, hump yard)

== Europe ==
=== British Isles ===
==== Ireland ====
Within the Republic of Ireland and Northern Ireland there are no notable marshalling yards still extant. North Wall yard in Dublin is used for loading permanent way materials trains and stabling unused stock. Also host a small wagon repair shop used to maintain ore and container wagons.

==== Great Britain ====
British Railways undertook a major programme of investment in marshalling yards in the early 1960s, some of which were arguably obsolete before they even opened. Many have since been closed entirely. Those that remain have been substantially dismantled. None retain hump facilities and instead see only very limited flat-shunting.

===== Yards currently in operation =====
As of 2009, DB Schenker Rail (UK) operates the following marshalling yards, defined as sites "where trains can be marshalled or re-marshalled using resident pilot locomotives, ground staff and train examination staff".

- Ayr: Falkland Yard
- Birmingham: Washwood Heath Yard
- Cardiff: Cardiff Tidal Sidings
- Didcot: Didcot Yard
- Doncaster: Decoy Yard and Belmont Yard
- Edinburgh: Millerhill Yard (opened 1963; substantially closed 1983)
- Glasgow: Mossend
- Gravesend:Hoo Junction Yard
- London: Hither Green
- London: Willesden Brent Sidings, and Wembley Yard (New construction on the site of the former Willesden Yard)
- Middlesbrough: Tees Yard, Thornaby (opened 1963)
- Newport: Alexandra Dock Junction (Newport Junction) Sidings
- Nottingham: Toton Yard
- Port Talbot: Margam Knuckle Yard (opened 1960)
- Swansea: Swansea Burrows Sidings
- Tyne & Wear:Birtley: Tyne Yard, Lamesley (opened 1963)
- Wakefield: Healey Mills Marshalling Yard (opened 1963, closed 2012)
- Walsall: Bescot Yard (reconstructed 1966)
- Warrington (serving Liverpool and Manchester): Arpley Sidings
- Wiltshire: Westbury Sidings

===== Historically significant marshalling yards, now dismantled or used for other purposes =====
- Dearne Valley: Wath concentration yard, for South Yorkshire coal traffic to Manchester (opened 1907; closed 1988)
- Carlisle: Kingmoor Yard (opened 1963) Still in continuous use for traffic as of 2011.
- Crewe: Basford Hall Yard (opened 1901; electrified 1961; now a dedicated container train intermodal hub.)
- March: Whitemoor Yard, (opened by the LNER in 1929; now the site of Whitemoor Prison. Although some parts remain operational)
- Liverpool: Edge Hill "Gridiron" (opened 1873)
- London: Temple Mills, Stratford (reconstructed 1958)
- London: Ripple Lane Yard, Barking (opened 1958; closed 1965)
- London: Feltham Yard (opened by LSWR 1917; closed 1969)
- London: Cricklewood (built by the Midland Railway in the 1870s)
- Perth: (opened 1962)
- Rogiet: Severn Tunnel Junction yard (reconstructed 1960/62; closed 1987)
- Sheffield: Tinsley Marshalling Yard (opened 1965, closed beginning 1985 – site now an intermodal terminal)
- Thornton Marshalling Yard, Fife, Scotland (opened in 1956)
- York: Dringhouses

=== Nordic countries ===
==== Finland ====
- Hamina: Poitsila yard
- Helsinki: Vuosaari yard
- Helsinki: Pasila yard (Former hump yard. Has little use for yard in its size.)
- Imatra: Freight yard
- Joensuu: Peltola and Sulkulahti yards
- Kokkola: Ykspihlaja freight yard
- Kokkola: Ykspihlaja mid-yard
- Kotka: Hovinsaari yard (former hump yard)
- Kotka: Mussalo and Kotolahti yards
- Kouvola: Marshalling yard (hump yard) (12 + 48)
- Oulu: Nokela yard (Former hump yard)
- Pieksämäki: Marshalling yard (Former hump yard. Mainly used as storage for rolling stock.)
- Riihimäki: Korttio (9 + 24) (former hump yard)
- Seinäjoki: Freight yard
- Tampere: Viinikka (hump yard) (11 + 31)

==== Norway ====
- Oslo: Alnabru
- Bergen
- Trondheim
- Fauske
- Narvik

==== Sweden ====
- Borlänge (24)
- Gävle (18)
- Gothenburg: Sävenäs (34)
- Hallsberg (marshalling yard) (32)
- Helsingborg (24)
- Malmö (26)

=== Baltic states ===
- Estonia
  - Tallinn: Ülemiste (16)
- Latvia
  - Ventspils
  - Riga: (marshalling yard) (26)
  - Rēzekne II
  - Daugavpils (marshalling yard) (26)
- Lithuania:
  - Šiauliai: Radviliškis (largest yard in baltic region)
  - Vilnius: Vaidotai (16)
  - Vilnius: Vilnius Intermodal Terminal
  - Kaunas: Kaunas Intermodal Terminal

=== Eastern Europe ===
- Belarus
  - Maladzyechna: (11)
  - Minsk: (marshalling yard) (21)
  - Orsha: (at main station) (12?)
  - Mogilev: (on the Dnieper river) (16)
  - Zhlobin:
  - Gomel: (unusual bilateral yard, with two marshalling sections on different lines) Homel'-Nečetnyj line (21), Minsk and Homel'-Četnyj (12) tracks in the direction of the route from Brest
  - Baranavichy: (located at central station) (15)
  - Brest-Vostočny : 'Eastern' (10 + 13)
  - Brest -Severny 'northern' (12 + 12): Dual gauge system
- Ukraine
  - Konotop
  - Kyiv: Darnytsia (24 + 18)
  - Kovel: Kovel' (11)
  - Lviv: Klepariv (19), L'viv-Zachid (Western railway station) (20)
  - Chop: Čop (16), Vuzlove (16)
  - Zhmerynka/Vinnytsia: Žmerynka-Podil's'ka, Žmerynka-Vantažna (railway station) (22?)
  - Znamianka: Znam'janka-Sortuval'na (marshalling yard) (28)
  - Kremenchuk: Kremenčuk-Čerednyky
  - Poltava: Poltava-Pivdenna-Sortuval'na (southern marshalling yard) (21)
  - Kharkiv: Osnova (28 + 20), Charkiv-Sortuval'nyj (22)
  - Kupiansk: Kup'jans'k-Sortuval'nyj (bilateral yard 24? + 16?)
  - Donbas:
    - Lyman: (zweiseitig, 33 + 24)
    - Horlivka: Mykytjivka (15 + 17)
    - Debaltseve: Debal'ceve-Sortuval'na (28 + 23)
    - Ilovaisk: Ilovajs'k (17 + 12)
    - Donetsk: Yasynuvata-Sortuval'na (32 + 42)
    - Pokrovsk: Pokrovs'k
  - Volnovakha: Volnovacha (20)
  - Zaporizhzhia: Zaporižžja-Live (22)
  - Dnipro: Nyžn'odniprovs'k-Vuzol (railway junction) (31 + 16)
  - Kryvyi Rih: Kryvyj Rih-Sortuval'nyj (marshalling yard) (21)
  - Odesa: Odesa-Sortuval'na, Odesa-Zastava I (22)
  - Rozdilna: Rozdil'na-Sortuval'na (28)
  - Mykolaiv: Mykolajiv-Sortuval'nyj (18)
  - Dzhankoi: Džankoj (24)
- Moldova
  - Moldova
    - Chişinău (18)
  - Transnistria – no yard
- Azerbaijan
  - Bilajary
  - H.Z.Tagiyev: H.Z.Tağıyev-Çeşidləmə
  - Ələt: Baş-Ələt
  - Shirvan: Şirvan-Çeşidləmə (closed)

=== Central Europe ===
- Poland
  - Częstochowa Towarowa – ul. Boya-Żeleńskiego 7/9, 42-200 Częstochowa – 50.794471°N 19.137813°E
  - Dąbrowa Górnicza Towarowa – Zakawie, 42-530 Dąbrowa Górnicza – 50.319°N 19.333988°E
  - Jaworzno-Szczakowa – ul. Kolejarzy 22, 43-602 Jaworzno – 50.247049°N 19.293219°E
  - Kielce Herbskie – ul. Oskara Kolberga, 25-620 Kielce – 50.885809°N 20.604125°E
  - Kobylany – Kobylany, 21-540 Małaszewicze – 52.038474°N 23.561403°E
  - Kraków Nowa Huta – ul. Ruszcza 1, 31-988 Kraków – 50.091266°N 20.135381°E
  - Łazy – ul. Grunwaldzka, 42-450 Łazy – 50.429117°N 19.390814°E
  - Łódź Olechów – ul. Jędrzejowska 170, 93-636 Łódź – 51.7302°N 19.597757°E
  - Małaszewicze – 21-540 Małaszewicze – 52.02689°N 23.528122°E
  - Medyka – ul. Zaokop, 37-732 Medyka – 49.804504°N 22.945989°E
  - Poznań Franowo – ul. Piwna 6, 61-065 Poznań – 52.384376°N 17.011085°E
  - Rybnik Towarowy – ul. Wodzisławska 249B, 44-270 Rybnik – 50.066567°N 18.51514°E
  - Skarżysko-Kamienna – ul. Kolejowa, 26-110 Skarżysko-Kamienna – 51.129°N 20.894°E
  - Sławków Euroterminal – ul. Groniec 1, 41-260 Sławków – 50.282003°N 19.30972°E
  - Tarnowskie Góry – ul. Częstochowska 7, 42-600 Tarnowskie Góry
  - Tarnów Filia – ul. Przemysłowa 10, 33-100 Tarnów
  - Warszawa Praga – ul. Pożarowa 2, 03-308 Warsaw – 52.283849°N 21.018874°E
  - Wrocław Brochów – ul. Mościckiego, 52-110 Wrocław – 51.052442°N 17.097956°E
  - Węgliniec – ul. Kolejowa, 59-940 Węgliniec – 51.290516°N 15.217999°E
  - Zabrzeg-Czarnolesie – ul. Czarnoleska 14, 43-516 Zabrzeg – 49.903888°N 18.903466°E
- Czech Republic
  - Děčín hlavní nádraží (14)
  - Most Nové nádraží (30)
  - Plzeň: Plzeň seřaďovací nádraží (22)
  - Prague
    - Praha-Libeň (15)
    - Praha-Uhříněves _{(cs)}
  - Nymburk hlavní nádraží (29)
  - Česká Třebová seřaďovací nádraží (38)
  - Ostrava hlavní nádraží (20 + 20)
  - Přerov přednádraží (32)
  - Brno-Maloměřice (22)
  - České Budějovice seřaďovací nádraží (22)
  - Břeclav přednádraži (13)
- Slovakia
  - Žilina zriaďovacia stanica (18 + 22); closed after Žilina-Teplička opened; completely removed within reconstruction of Žilina railway junction (2020-2024)
  - Žilina-Teplička: 18 hump yard + 19 other tracks (6 receiving + 7 transit + 5 departure + 1 locomotive) + 2 intermodal; opened 2011
  - Košice nákladná stanica (21)
  - Zvolen východ (12)
  - Čierna nad Tisou (21 + 16)
  - Bratislava-Východ (East station, 37)
  - Štúrovo (26)
  - Dunajská Streda
- Hungary
  - Székesfehérvár (12)
  - Budapest Ferencváros rendező pu. (32 (+ 28 temporary closed))
  - Miskolc rendező pu. (30)
  - Záhony Fényeslitke Déli rendező pu. (railway station south yard, 24)
  - Dombóvár (14)

=== Germany ===
In Germany due to ongoing consolidation it is likely that some yards will close. The ones likely to continue in operation are marked in bold.

- Northern Germany
  - Rostock Seehafen (32)
  - Hamburg: **Maschen Marshalling Yard** (Built 1977, 48 + 64) Europe's biggest yard, second biggest yard world wide
  - Osnabrück Rbf (34)
  - Hannover **Seelze Rbf** (17 + 34)
- Eastern Germany
  - Berlin (Potsdam): **Seddin (Potsdam)** (28 + 15)
  - Senftenberg South (19), North closed
- Central Germany
  - **Halle (Saale) Gbf** (36)
  - Leipzig: Engelsdorf (Leipzig) (26)
  - Dresden-Friedrichstadt Rbf (34)
- Western Germany
  - Bebra Rbf (21)
  - Kassel Rbf (11 + 5 + 2, + 9 long and 4 short tracks) outdated
  - Ruhrgebiet
    - Hamm (Westf) (14) for decades was Europe's largest yard
    - Herne Wanne-Eickel Hbf
    - Oberhausen-Osterfeld Süd (40)
    - Schwerte (Ruhr) (16)
    - Hagen-Vorhalle (40)
  - Siegen: Kreuztal Güterbahnhof (19)
  - Cologne: **Gremberg** (31 + 32); Köln-Kalk Nord (24)
  - Mainz: Mainz-Bischofsheim (22) The station is nowadays not within the political boundaries of the city of Mainz in Rhineland-Palatinate, but in the municipality of Bischofsheim, Hesse
  - Saarbrücken Rbf (37 / 14 + 23)
- Southern Germany
  - **Mannheim Rbf** (42 + 41) second largest Rbf in Deutschland
  - Stuttgart: Kornwestheim Rbf (35)
  - **Nürnberg Rbf** (60)
  - Ingolstadt Hbf (20)
  - **München Nord Rbf** (40)

=== Benelux ===
- Netherlands
  - Rotterdam: Kijfhoek (42)
- Belgium
  - Antwerp-North (40 + 56)
  - Ghent-Zeehaven (32)
  - Bruges: Zeebrugge-Vorming (28; after expansion 24 + 30)
  - Liège: Kinkempois-Formation (38)
  - Namur: Ronet-Formation (41) For international ISO-Container
  - Charleroi: Monceau-sur-Sambre-Formation (32)
- Luxemburg
  - Bettembourg: Bettembourg-Triage (28)

=== France ===
- Nord-Pas-de-Calais: Somain (32)
- Metz: Woippy-Triage (48), Largest yard in France
- Paris: Le Bourget-Triage (48), Villeneuve-Saint-Georges-Triage (48)
- Bordeaux: Hourcade (48)
- Dijon: Gevrey-Triage (48)
- Lyon: Sibelin-Triage (44)
- Marseille/Fos-sur-Mer: Miramas (48)
- Strasbourg: Hausbergen
- Mulhouse: Mulhouse-Nord
- Toulouse: Fenouillet (47)

=== Alpine countries ===
- Switzerland:
  - Basel SBB RB (in Muttenz) (43 planned reduction to 32 + 32)
  - Buchs Canton St. Gallen (16)
  - Zürich: Rangierbahnhof Limmattal (RBL), in the Limmat Valley between Spreitenbach and Dietikon (64)
  - Biel/Bienne-Mett RB (22) To close in 2009
  - Lausanne Triage (in Denges) (38) Adding of 7 more tracks planned
  - Chiasso Smistamento (24)
- Austria:
  - Salzburg-Gnigl (22)
  - Wels Vbf (Verschiebebahnhof) (30)
  - Linz Vbf (29) Expansion planned
  - Vienna: Wien Zvbf (Zentralverschiebebahnhof) (48)
  - Innsbruck: Hall in Tirol (20)
  - Villach Süd (40)
  - In Styria due to the lack of an efficient marshalling yard shunting is divided between Selzthal, Graz Vbf und Bruck an der Mur freight station (the latter has no hump)

=== Southeastern Europe ===
- Slovenia
  - Ljubljana: Zalog (39)
- Croatia
  - Zagreb ranžirni kolodvar (48)
- Bosnia and Herzegovina (Bosnian/Croatian fed.): No yard
- Bosnia and Herzegovina (Serbia)
  - Doboj (14)
- Serbia
  - Belgrade: Beograd ranžirna Makiš (120)
  - Niš ranžirna stanica Popovac
  - Novi Sad: Ranžirna stanica Novi Sad
  - Lapovo: Ranžirna stanica Lapovo
- Montenegro: No current yards
- Romania
  - Iaşi: Socola (24)
  - Dej Triaj (25)
  - Oradea Est Triaj (24)
  - Arad (18)
  - Timișoara: Ronaț Triaj (23)
  - Caransebeş Triaj (24)
  - Simeria Triaj (28)
  - Teiuş: Coşlariu (24)
  - Braşov Triaj (26)
  - Adjud (24)
  - Galaţi: Barboşi Triaj (32)
  - Ploieşti Triaj (31)
  - Piteşti: Goleşti
  - Craiova Triaj (20)
  - Bucharest: București Triaj (16)
  - Constanţa: Palas (23)
- Bulgaria
  - Rousse: Russe razp. (12) (Note: razp. bulg. разпределител)
  - (Varna): Sindel (24)
  - Varna: Varna razp.
  - Gorna Oryahovitsa: Gorna Oryahovitsa razp. (29)
  - Sofia: Poduyane-razp. (32)
  - Burgas razp. (20)
  - Plovdiv: Plovdiv razp. (27)
- North Macedonia
  - Skopje-Trubarevo (24)
- Albania: No yard
- Greece
  - Thessalonika: Thessaloniki-Dialogis (16)
- Turkey (European part)
  - Istanbul: Halkalı yard (10) (Originally larger, half of the tracks used for freight trains were closed when the adjacent Halkalı station was rebuilt and expanded.)
  - Kapıkule: Kapıkule yard (13)

=== Southern Europe ===
- Italy
  - Cervignano del Friuli: Cervignano Smistamento (32)
  - Milan: Milano Smistamento (48)
  - Turin: Torino Orbassano (32) terminus
  - Alessandria Smistamento (37) terminus
  - Bologna San Donato (32 + 22) terminus
  - Naples: Marcianise Smistamento (32) South of Caserta
- Spain
  - León Classificación (19)
  - Zaragoza: Zaragoza-la Almozara (13)
  - Barcelona: Can Tunis (16) hump removed
  - Madrid: Vicálvaro Classificación (30)
  - Córdoba-Mercancías (8)
- Portugal
  - Entroncamento (13)

=== Russia ===
- Sankt-Peterburg-Sortirovochnyy-Moskovskiy
- Volkhovstroy I
- Smolensk-Sortirovochnyy
- Bekasovo-Sortirovochnoye
- Lyublino-Sortirovochnoye
- Bryansk-L'govskiy
- Rybnoye
- Orekhovo-Zuyevo
- Yudino
- Agryz
- Nizhniy Novgorod-Sortirovochnyy
- Lyangasovo
- Losta
- Yaroslavl'-Glavnyy
- Bataysk
- Likhaya
- Liski
- Kochetovka I
- Im. Maksima Gor'kogo
- Anisovka
- Penza III
- Syzran' I
- Dema
- Kinel'
- Perm'-Sortirovochnaya
- Yekaterinburg-Sortirovochnyy
- Voynovka
- Chelyabinsk-Glavnyy
- Orsk
- Orenburg
- Moskovka
- Vkhodnaya
- Altayskaya
- Inskaya
- Krasnoyarsk-Vostochnyy
- Tayshet
- Irkutsk-Sortirovochnyy
- Komsomol'sk-Sortirovochnyy
- Khabarovsk II

== Asia ==
- India
  - Mughalsarai Railway Yard
  - Katni Railway Yard
  - Asansol Railway Yard
  - Bhilai Railway Marshalling Yard
  - Bondamunda Railway Yard
  - Bhusawal Railway Yard
  - Howrah Railway Yard
  - Sealdah (Beliaghata) Rail Yard
  - Naihati Goods Sorting Yard
  - Siliguri Railway Yard
  - CSMT Railway Yard
  - Jammu Tawi Railway Yard
  - Rani Laxmi Bai Nagar Railway Yard
  - Tambaram MG Railway Yard (Now Abandoned)
  - New Guwahati Yard
  - Lumding Yard
  - New Tinsukia Yard
  - ICF Coach Complex Yard
  - Kalka NG Yard
  - Bina Marshalling Yard
  - HAPA Marshalling Yard
- Indonesia
  - Jakarta Kota Railway Yard, Jakarta
  - Cipinang Locomotive Rail Yard Jakarta
  - Depok Railway Yard, Depok, Largest Rail Yard in SouthEast Asia
  - Sidotopo Railway Yard, Surabaya
  - Kalimas Railway Yard, Surabaya
  - Semarang Gudang Railway Yard (closed), Semarang
- China
  - Mainland
    - Zhengzhou North railway station (郑州北站), over 6,000 m long and over 800 m wide, described as Asia's largest marshalling yard
    - Fengtai West railway station (a major freight terminal for Beijing)
    - Wuhan North railway station (112 tracks)
    - Nanxiang railway station, located in Shanghai
    - Nanjing East railway station
    - Xuzhou North railway station
    - Zhuzhou North railway station
    - Jiangcun railway station, located in Guangzhou
    - Guiyang South railway station
    - Chengdu North railway station – different from Chengdu railway station(passenger station) which is called "North railway station(火车北站)" by Chengdu citizens
    - Sujiatun railway station
    - Xinfengzhen(Town Xinfeng; 新丰镇) railway station
    - Lanzhou North railway station
    - Hekou North railway station, connection between China's standard-gauge network and Vietnam's meter-gauge network
    - Houma North railway station
  - Hong Kong
    - Ho Tung Lau Depot – maintenance facility for East Rail line
    - Pat Heung Depot – maintenance facility for West Rail line
    - Siu Ho Wan Depot – for Tung Chung line
    - Hung Hom Freight Freight Terminus/Yard
    - Kowloon Freight Yard
    - Lo Wu Freight and Marshalling Yard
- South Korea
  - Busan : Busan Rail Yard, Busan High Speed Rail Yard (77, Gaya station)
  - Daejeon : Daejeon Rail Yard (60, Daejeon Yard station)
  - Goyang : Seoul High Speed Rail Yard (Haengsin station)
  - Jecheon : Jecheon Rail Yard (70, Jecheon Yard station)
  - Seoul : Seoul Rail Yard (102, Susaek station)
- Sri Lanka

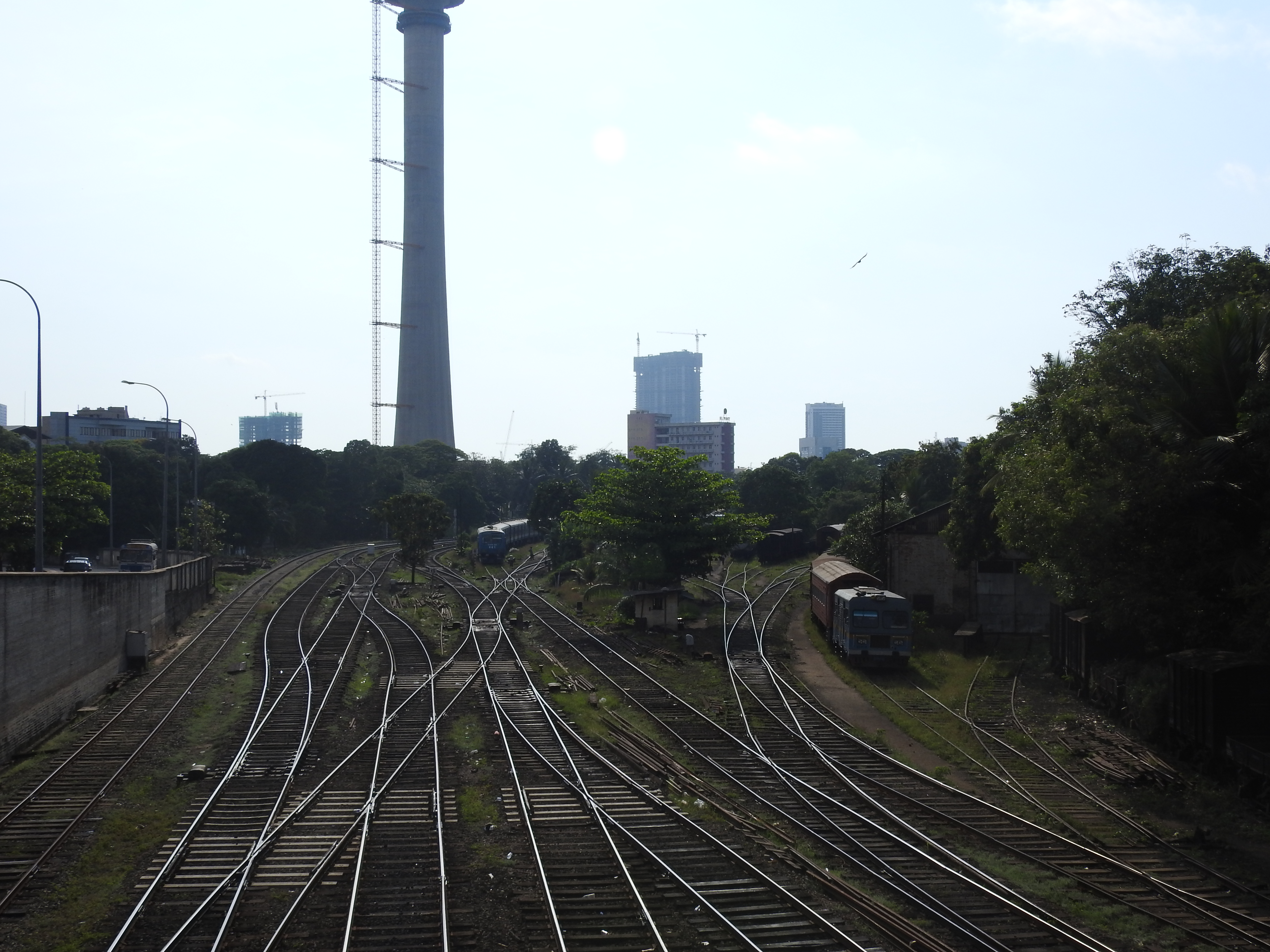
Maradana Yard In Sri Lanka

  - Colombo Yard
  - Rathmalana Shops
  - Maradana & Dematagoda Running Sheds
- Turkey

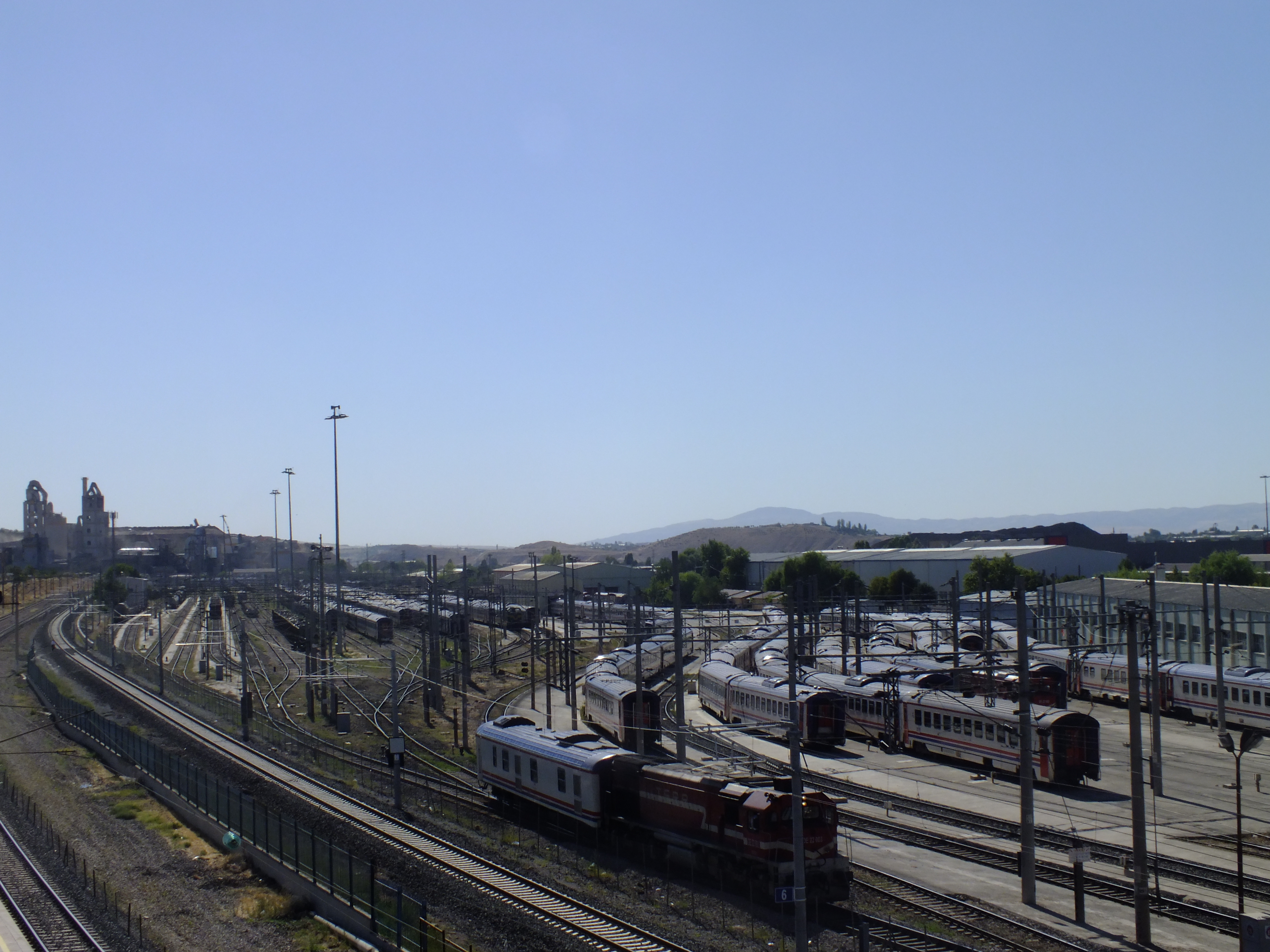
Marşandiz yard in Ankara

  - Istanbul : Haydarpaşa yard (10)
  - Ankara : Marşandiz Yard (20, Marshalling section of the much larger facility)
  - Eskişehir : Hasanbey Yard (9, Marshalling section of the Hasanbey Logistics Center)
  - Eskişehir : Eskişehir yard (11, closed in 2012)
  - Kayseri: Kayseri Yard
  - Afyon: Afyon Yard
  - Karabük: Karabük Yard
- Thailand
  - Bangkok : Bangsue Junction – Phahonyothin Yard
  - Bangkok : Makkasan Workshop Yard
  - Hatyai : Hatyai Junction Yard
  - Nakhon Ratchasima : Nakhon Ratchasima Yard
  - Laem Chabang : Port of Laem Chabang Yard
  - Surat Thani : Ban Thung Phoe Junction Container Yard
  - Thung Song : Thung Song Junction Yard
- Japan
  - Omiya : Omiya Train yard

== Africa ==
- Kidatu, Tanzania – transhipment from 3 ft 6 in (1,067 mm) gauge to metre gauge.
- Dabuka, Zimbabwe

== Oceania ==
=== Australia ===
- Acacia Ridge, Queensland dual gauge
- Avon Yard, Toodyay, Western Australia
- Bromelton Queensland under construction; dual gauge
- Dynon, Victoria dual gauge
- Enfield, New South Wales standard gauge
- Forrestfield, Western Australia
- Keswick, South Australia
- Kewdale, Western Australia standard gauge
- Mile End, South Australia

=== New Zealand ===
- Westfield – North Island
- Southdown – North Island
- Te Rapa – North Island
- Middleton – South Island
- Lyttleton – South Island

== South America ==
=== Brazil ===
- Uvaranas
- Rio de Janeiro Docks
- Açailândia (Ferrovia Norte-Sul)

== See also ==
- Rail transport
