= Hamilton, Grimsby and Beamsville Electric Railway =

Overview
- Headquarters: Hamilton, Ontario
- Locale: Niagara Peninsula, Ontario
- Dates of operation: 1894–1931

Technical
- Track gauge: 4 ft 8 1/2 in (1,435 mm) standard gauge

The Hamilton, Grimsby and Beamsville Electric Railway (HG&B) was an interurban railway that operated between Hamilton and Vineland in the Niagara Peninsula in Ontario, Canada. It was incorporated in 1894.

Hamilton, Grimsby and Beamsville's interurban line ran for 22 miles along the southern shore of Lake Ontario. The HG&B interchanged freight cars with other lines in the Hamilton Radial System, with the TH&B [Kinnear Yard] and with the Grand Trunk [Winona]. Spur lines were constructed to Grimsby Park and the canning factories. The HG&B derived a large amount of revenue by hauling fruit grown in the northern section of the Niagara Peninsula. It built a car shop in Grimsby and a coal-fired steam-electric DC generator at Stoney Creek. In 1904 the HG&B began using AC power from Hamilton Cataract's hydro-electric generator at Decew Falls, two miles south of St. Catharines, It then converted its Stoney Creek DC station to an AC substation.

A 4.5-mile (7.2 km) extension from Beamsville to Vineland opened in 1904 with the hope of a connection to St. Catharines. The connection was never made as bridging the Twenty Mile Creek ravine was economically unfeasible.

The Vineland extension was abandoned in 1905 when local revenue was insufficient to cover operating costs, but its streetcar service was expanded to Oakville, with future plans to connect to the Toronto streetcar system in Port Credit. This failed to happen, and service was cut back to Burlington in 1925. In 1927, street car service stopped entirely. The company ended in 1931 when its line was abandoned and torn up.

== See also ==
- List of Ontario railways
- List of defunct Canadian railways
