= Fulton Yard =

Rail yard in Richmond, Virginia

Coordinates: 37°30′40″N 77°24′40″W

Fulton Yard is a rail yard on CSX Transportation's Peninsula Subdivision in Richmond, Virginia. It was originally owned by the Chesapeake and Ohio Railway, has 13 tracks, and is located along Virginia State Route 5 between the Fulton Bottom and Lower Rockets sections of Richmond.

The Fulton Yard was formerly operated by the Chesapeake and Ohio Railway, who earmarked $150,000 for improvements there to be completed in 1924. The yard was believed to be the source of oil pollution in the James River in 1988.

== See also ==
- List of rail yards
