= Perth New Yard =

Former railway marshalling yard in Scotland

- Interactive map of Perth New Yard

Location
- Location: Perth, Scotland
- Coordinates: 56.409°N 3.455°W
- OS grid: NO102251

Characteristics
- Owner: British Rail; Network Rail
- Operator: British Railways; Railfreight; EWS/DB Cargo
- Type: Marshalling yard
- Roads: 36 (at opening)
- Routes served: See text

History
- Opened: 12 March 1962
- Closed: 2008
- BR region: Scottish Region

Perth New Yard (also known as Perth North Yard, Perth Marshalling Yard, and Perth Muirton Yard) is a former railway marshalling yard in the city of Perth, Scotland. The yard was built in the early 1960s to gather traffic from around the Perth area and goods wagons from the lines radiating from Perth. It was latterly used as an engineering and wagon storage depot until it was finally closed in 2008.

== History ==
In the middle of the 19th century, Perth was described as a "railway frontier town" as it was served by four different railway companies. Even after the grouping of 1923, it was still served by both the London and North Eastern Railway (LNER) and London, Midland and Scottish Railway (LMS). This left a legacy of engine sheds, wagon repair locations, and goods depots. With nationalisation came the 1955 Modernisation Plan, which called for centralised goods sorting, and Perth New Yard was one of four main yards in Scotland to handle the wagonload traffic business, the others being Millerhill in Edinburgh, Thornton Yard near Glenrothes, and Mossend near Glasgow.

The schematic for Perth New Yard was unveiled in 1955, detailing a diversion of an adjacent watercourse known as Perth Lade. Perth New Yard was located 1 mile 7 chains (1.8 km) north of Perth railway station on the lines towards Pitlochry, Forfar, and Crieff, and was intended to replace four yards in the Perth area and prevent extra shunting at Aviemore. It was approved in October 1956, opening to traffic in March 1962 with six reception lines, 30 sorting sidings, and a 70-foot (21 m) turntable at the south end, to a cost of £820,000 (equivalent to £15,305,000 in 2025).

To the north of the yard lay the lines to Crieff, Aberfeldy, Inverness (the Highland Main Line) and the Strathmore line, which ran from Stanley Junction on the Highland Main Line through Forfar to Kinnaber Junction, near Montrose on the line to Aberdeen. The Strathmore line was closed to passengers in 1967, and then to all freight through Forfar in 1982. Initially the yard served a total of 55 locations by outward workings, but these flows dropped in number as the local terminals were closed. As a result of this, Perth New Yard was one of many of the new marshalling yards that were criticised as being white elephants as their intended traffic streams shrunk with the modernisation and contracting of the railways. By 1968, all the traffic that the yard at Perth had been built for had disappeared from the railway system.

All trains entered the reception sidings which were located closest to the running lines of the Highland Main Line on the eastern side of the yard complex. Each train had a cut card created (Note: A cut was the term for when wagon is split from a main train consist as it was pushed (propelled) over the hump, which allowed the wagons to be cut from the main train consist, and the single wagon descended under gravity and the braking of the retarders to flow into a specific siding. The cut card gave the panel operations machine the correct time and placing to change the points controlling all the sidings, making sure the right wagon went into the right siding.) detailing what each wagon was carrying, and where it was going. This was fed into the office of the yard inspector and the hump control tower, and the train was pushed to the headshunt at the northern end of the yard adjacent to the Almond Valley Line to Crieff. The train would then be propelled southwards over the hump, and the wagons would pass through the Westinghouse retarders, and then into one of the 30 sidings to become part of a consist sent to one of the 55 destinations served by Perth New Yard. The speed over the hump was 1.25 miles per hour (2.01 km/h), but wagons could reach 4 miles per hour (6.4 km/h) as they ran downhill into the sidings. It was important at Perth that the latter speed was not exceeded, as it would spoil some of the commodities handled at Perth, specifically the whisky. Signalling at the yard was controlled by the hump tower, but was mostly automated with six computers covering the distribution of wagons. The computers in the relay room had special stabilisers fitted so that they had a constant flow of voltage. In addition to this, the relay room had a maintenance panel through which humping operations could be simulated to check that the points, lights and retarders were all working as they should.

In 1962, the yard was handling 1,300 wagons per day, but the seed potato season could add an extra 250 wagons per day onto that tally. However, it soon ceased to be a marshalling yard with the hump closed in the early 1970s. Instead it sent feeder services going to Mossend and Millerhill to connect in with other trunk wagonload services on what was the British Rail Speedlink network. A survey from 1984 stated that Perth yard would have been the gathering point for at least two local sidings which fed into the Speedlink network. Typical traffic between 1981 and 1991 (when Speedlink was abandoned), was inward flows of confectionery from Rowntrees in York, agricultural lime, fertiliser from France to Forfar, and industrial and domestic coal. Outward cargoes were timber (to Workington in 1990), seed potatoes from Forfar, and whisky from the Inveralmond Distillery. The whisky was railed to various points in the United Kingdom (Ashford and Liverpool), but was also exported via the Dover Train Ferry. The last two goods terminals not in the yard, the old North British terminal and the Rowntrees sidings, were closed in 1989. (Note: Rowntrees traffic from York ceased during 1987. It is unclear if the goods siding then fell into disuse and was closed two years thereafter, or whether other traffic was using it.) The whisky traffic was the last Perth generated freight to use the yard before Speedlink was abandoned in 1991.

By the turn of the 21st century, the yard still had more than twenty sidings covering 36.6 acres (14.8 ha), but was being used largely as a civil engineering depot. Some of the redundant infrastructure and engineering wagons were sold off to heritage railways in 2001, by the then operator of the yard, EWS. However, some traffic was generated at the site as it was used for timber loading sporadically in the early part of the 21st century. Engineering and infrastructure works ceased around the same time as the timber loading did, and the site was used to store redundant coal wagons, before complete closure in 2008. The buildings on the site were demolished due to vandalism between 2008 and 2009. With the railway connection locked out of use, the land of the yard was overgrown with scrub, black poplar and sycamore trees by 2022, and Network Rail agreed to disposing of their 4 acres (1.6 ha) of land. This was contested by one rail user, who wished to retain a loop at the location for charter heritage trains. A compromise was reached whereby sidings were built south of Perth station which would allow the looping of trains there instead. The site of the yard is recorded in the Historic Environment Scotland database.

== Naming ==
When planned, and upon opening, the yard was known as Perth New Yard as it was a concentrated yard for marshalling wagonload traffic in one location, supplanting several other shunting locations around Perth as a consequence of the four different railway companies who all used Perth. However, it has also been referred to as Perth Marshalling Yard, Perth North yard, and Perth Muirton yard, the last one being its actual location of Muirton in Perth.

== See also ==
- List of rail yards
- Perth Carriage Servicing Depot
- Thornton Marshalling Yard
