= CPKC Aberdeen Yard =

CPKC facility in Hamilton, Ontario

Coordinates: 43°15′08″N 79°54′20″W

CPKC Aberdeen Yard is one of two CPKC facilities in Hamilton, Ontario, Canada.

The yard is located in Kirkendall North, next to Chedoke Park and short distance from McMaster Children's Hospital Hamilton Health Sciences. The yard was formerly used by Toronto, Hamilton and Buffalo Railway and once had a roundhouse.

== See also ==
The other CPKC facility in the city is the CPKC Kinnear Yard.

== Incidents ==
- August 13 2008 - 3 car derailment at yard
