= CPKC Lambton Yard =

Freight marshalling yard in Toronto, Canada

Coordinates: 43°40′00″N 79°29′20″W

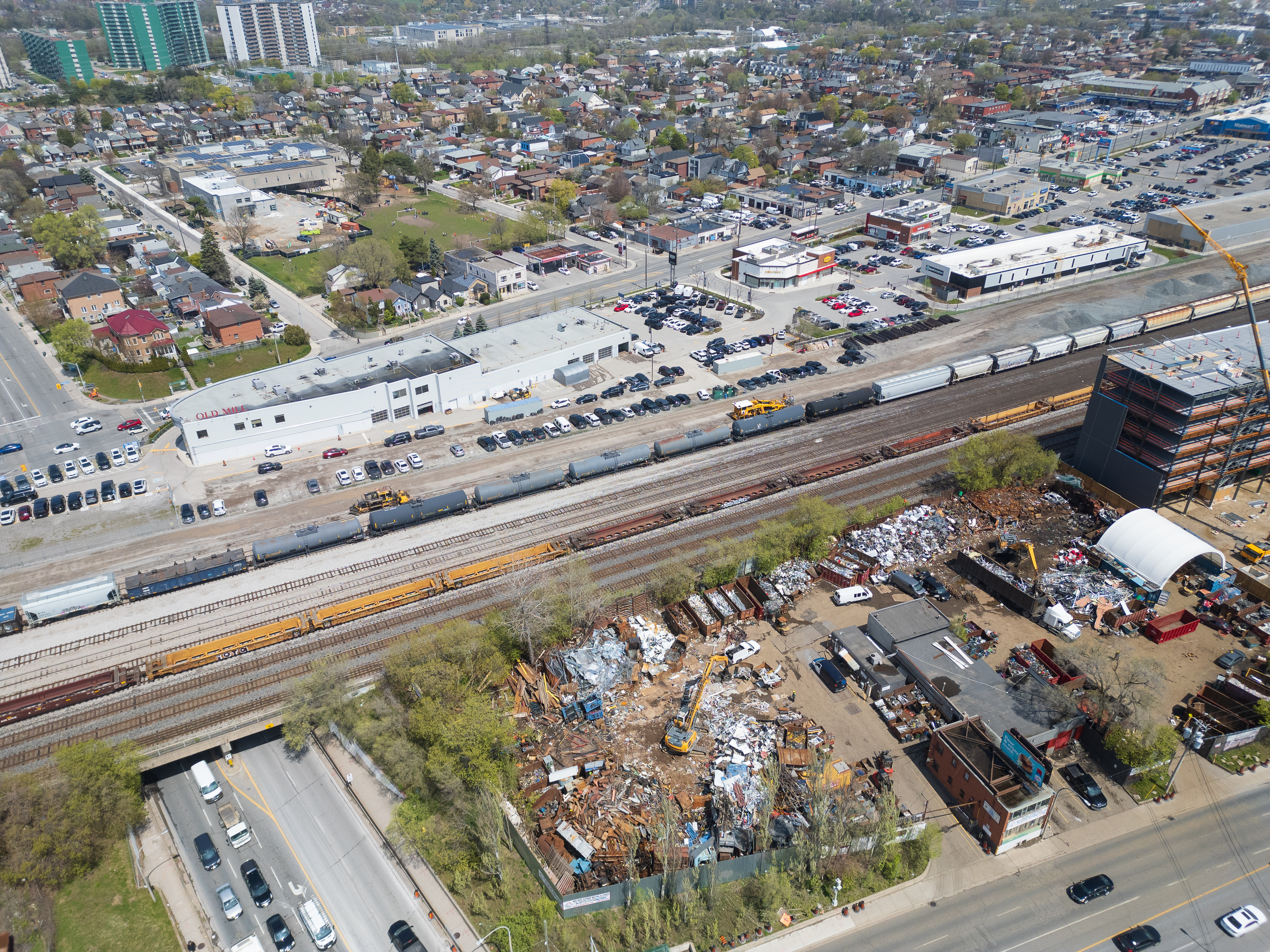

CPKC Lambton Yard is a freight marshalling yard for the Canadian Pacific Railway in Toronto, Ontario, Canada, and is located to the west of and contiguous with the West Toronto Yard on the Galt Subdivision. The two were the main freight marshalling yard complex for the CPR in Toronto until replaced by the modern CPR Toronto Yard in Agincourt in April 1964.

Built from 1912 to 1913, Lambton served as mechanical and freight facilities. It also had a roundhouse facility from 1913 to 1960. This infrastructure was replaced by an intermodal freight facility which transferred freight between truck and train, the site of which is now a Walmart store.

Around the mid-1960s an employee train shuttle works from Lambton over to the Toronto Yard in Agincourt.

It is located to the north of Dundas Street West and south of St. Clair Avenue West, between Runnymede Road and Scarlett Road.

Parts of the old turntable, namely the operator booth and parts of the table remain in the rear lot of the Rona store on West Toronto Street.
