= Thornton Marshalling Yard =

Former railway yard in Scotland

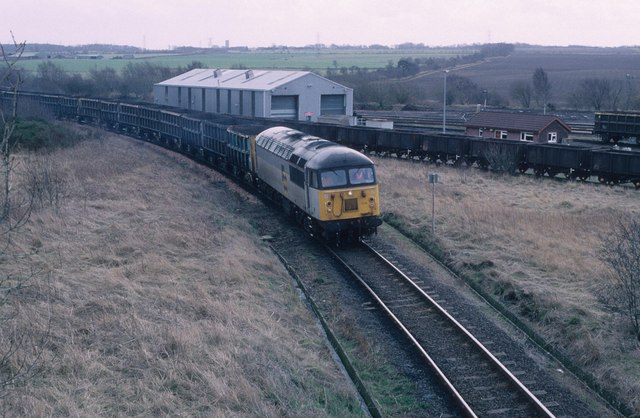
- The east end of the yard; the locomotive is on the single line to Westfield
- Interactive map of Thornton Marshalling Yard

Location
- Location: Thornton, Fife, Scotland
- Coordinates: 56.1599°N 3.1930°W
- OS grid: NT260970

Characteristics
- Owner: Network Rail
- Type: Marshalling yard

History
- Opened: 1956 (Note: Consensus seems to favour late 1956 c. November 1956, however, various dates are given. Ross suggests it was opened in January 1956.)
- BR region: Scottish Region

Thornton Marshalling Yard was a railway freight marshalling yard near to the village of Thornton, in Fife, Scotland. The site opened to traffic in 1956, and was gradually rundown over the intervening years, being largely abandoned and derelict by the second decade of the 21st century as traffic fell away. However, some of the infrastructure is still in place. The railway yard was the first of the newer marshalling yards created by British Rail to have a second set of retarders for wagons to travel through when descending the hump.

== Development ==
Thornton Marshalling Yard was built on a 78-acre (32 ha) site, 2.5 miles (4 km) west of the village of Thornton in Fife, and 1-mile (1.6 km) from Thornton Junction depot. The yard was one of five major marshalling yards planned in the Scottish Region after Nationalisation; the other four were Perth New Yard, Cadder (north Glasgow), Mossend (south Glasgow) and Millerhill. Its geographical location took advantage of being in an area of coal mines, with projected heavy investment in new and larger mines in the area. One in particular, Rothes, being a new planned mine by the National Coal Board. Rothes was expected to produce 6,000 tonnes (6,600 tons) of coal per day, so in anticipation of this, a dedicated line was built directly from the east end of the yard into Rothes Colliery.

The yard was located at Thornton for a variety of reasons; it could be constructed without interfering with day-to-day railway operations (the existing yards could keep operating), it was close to the depot at Thornton Junction, its location avoided the possibility of mining subsidence affecting it in the future, and the yard's location was central to minimising coal haulage across the region by cutting excessive shunting and tripworking. The major coalfield in Lanarkshire had shrunk in the 1940s and 1950s, and the Fife coalfield had projects such as Westfield (the biggest opencast site in Scotland), Rothes Colliery, and Seafield Colliery (which had an output of 5,000 tonnes (5,500 tons) per day); this amounted to over 35 coal-producing sites which would use Thornton Yard as its central hub.

Thornton yard was planned before the Modernisation Plan came into effect, with legal powers being obtained in the British Transport Commission Order Confirmation Act 1948 (11 & 12 Geo. 6. c. xxi), and the site was cleared in 1953, two years before the Modernisation Plan was announced. The yard had a number of lines running into and out of it, though the yard was set up to handle the bulk of its traffic to and from the east; 12 of its sorting sidings were for westbound traffic, but 23 were for eastbound traffic.

Westfield opencast site had opened in 1955 and was located on the line between Thornton Yard and Kelty Junction. The first part of the yard opened in November 1956, with full opening following in 1957 at a cost of £1,350,000 (equivalent to £29,243,000 in 2025) and it had the capacity to handle 3,000 wagons per day. It replaced a number of smaller marshalling yards dotted around central and east Fife, with a view to being a nodal point on the wagonload network as well as being a layover point and re-marshalling location for coal trains.

== Operational history ==
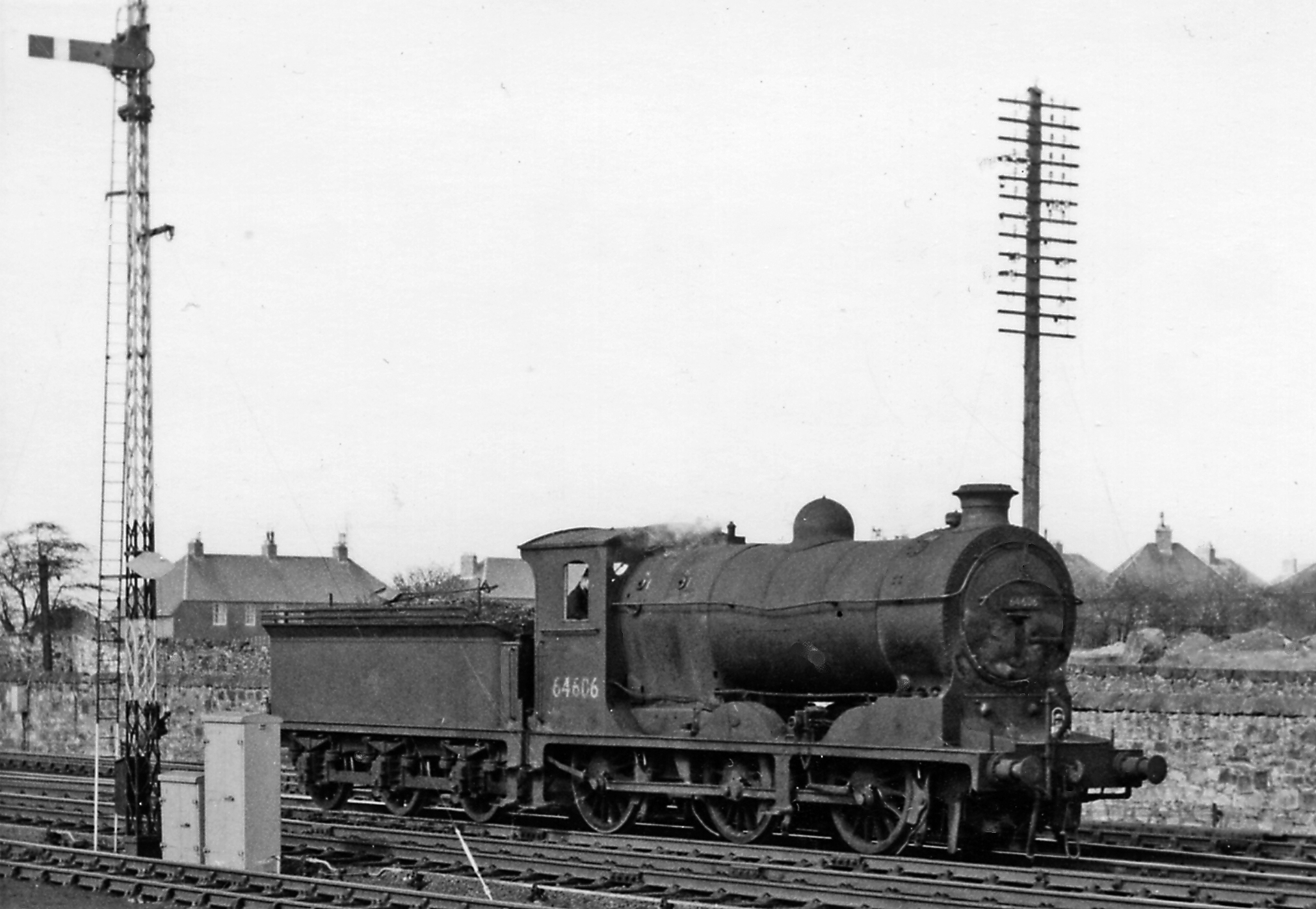
An ex-North British Railway locomotive near Thornton Junction station in 1966

One of the reasons that the yard suffered a significant drop in traffic was due to the coal-mining industry in the Fife Coalfield being rundown. Rothes Colliery, part of the reason why Thornton yard was built, was closed in 1962 due to water inundation after having only wound 750,000 tonnes (830,000 tons) of coal. The drop in coal tonnages meant that the tower and the hump at the west of the yard were abandoned in 1975. The yard was then flat shunted from the east end, and large parts of the yard became a coal concentration depot where trucks would bring coal into the yard from opencast sites to be loadared onto trains. The line to Kelty was closed from the Westfield opencast site by 1966, and Westfield itself stopped producing coal in 1997.

One particular contract that required marshalling of coal was two daily trains of 36 HAA hopper wagons from Westfield to power stations in Yorkshire. Restrictions over the Forth Bridge meant that the trains had to be shorter, so the two daily 36-wagon trains were re-marshalled into three 24-wagon trains. The yard also continued to focus as a layover point for trains from Killoch Washery and Westfield, which conveyed coal slurry to the power station on Methil Docks which was designed to burn this particular coal by-product.

The yard was used to marshal goods traffic from the surrounding areas to form trains that dovetailed into the wagonload Speedlink and Enterprise networks between 1973 and the 21st century. Typical loads handled at the yard other than coal were carbon dioxide from Cameron Bridge, clay and pulp to and from the local paperworks, military traffic to and from Crombie and Rosyth, whisky traffic from Markinch, and inward cargoes of grain to Cameron Bridge. The military traffic used to be shunted at Dunfermline Townhill Yard, but when this closed, Thornton Yard acted as the shunting location, with the military traffic going to Mossend Yard after reforming at Thornton.

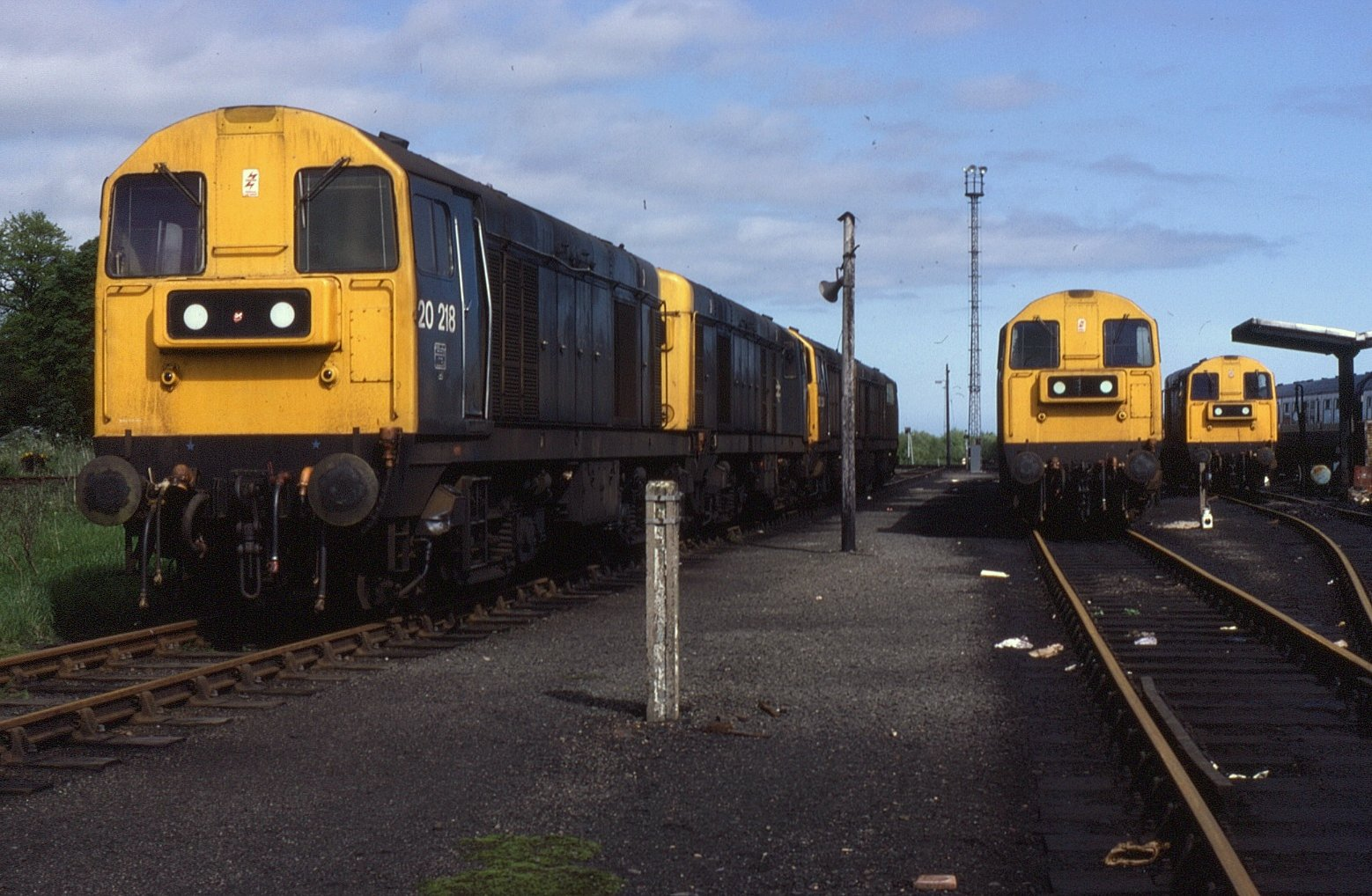
Three British Rail Class 20 trains in the yard in 1983

During the 1970s, one train per day left the yard and travelled up to Perth and the along the Highland Main Line to Inverness and beyond, delivering traffic to the Highlands. The grain traffic came from East Anglia, and the clay came from the West Country. In 1985, the yard was connected to the Speedlink network via a trunk route between Aberdeen and York Dringhouses Yard. In the late 1970s and early 1980s, the spare capacity at Thornton was utilised by empty coaching stock from the Edinburgh to Cowdenbeath Line (now part of the Fife Circle Line). Passenger trains only travelled to Cardenden in the peak hours, and east of Cardenden had been closed to passengers in 1969. By 1986, traffic had dwindled to such an extent that whilst many of the sidings were still extant, hardly any traffic was using them.

In the 21st century, freight traffic dwindled, and the sidings built on the former yard have been used to store redundant stock. Several sidings and a lime unloading branch were still extant in 2017, as was the line to Westfield, though it was registered as being out of use (OOU). As the infrastructure is still in the former yard it has been suggested as potential freight loading point for products and by-products from the Diageo bottling plant at Cameron Bridge. The re-opening of the line through Cameron Bridge (to Leven) also saw the yard partly used for the storage of sleepers.

== Design ==
Thornton Marshalling Yard extended for 1.5 miles (2.4 km), with six reception sidings and 35 sorting sidings. Independent up and down avoiding lines sandwiched the yard, with the passenger lines set to the south of the yard. It had a single hump at the west end, so traffic was sorted towards the easterly direction over a central hump which had two lines, each having of these lines had a retarder. The practice of sorting both up and down traffic in one location avoids the need to have two towers and two sets of staff sorting the traffic.

Thornton was the first yard in Britain built with a set of secondary retarders to help slow the speed of the wagons descending off the hump. (Note: Temple Mills Yard in East London had its secondary retarders installed first, but as Thornton Yard was easier to construct overall, it opened to traffic first.) The hump had been built to a higher altitude than at other marshalling yards such as Toton Yard, and so needed a longer descending bank and the need for two sets of retarders. Each one of these retarders was on is own track, and the total number of retarders was six in all. (Note: Ross notes that those who operated the yard described the retarders suffering from "interesting problems"; the large-scale use of this equipment was relatively new in British Rail.) Another first in marshalling yard terms for Thornton was the use of radar guns to maintain correct speed, and wagon weight detectors which determined how much braking force was needed for each wagon through the retarders.

Thornton Yard also had automatic point selectors; a trait it shared with Temple Mills Yard in London, and Margam Yard in South West Wales. As the site was planned and operational in the 1950s when steam power was still in use, a 70-foot (21 m) turntable was located at the east end of the yard. In 1984, a new two-road diesel shed was built at the east end of the yard to replace the old Thornton Junction depot. No main line locomotives were assigned to Thornton Junction, but three class 08 shunters were; these performed trips around the area, including the Auchmuchty branch. Once the shed was declared surplus to the operational need, it was used to store steam locomotives. This shed was demolished in 2019.

== See also ==
- List of rail yards
- Perth New Yard
