= CPKC West Toronto Yard =

Rail yard in Canada

Coordinates: 43°40′03″N 79°28′34″W

CPKC West Toronto Yard

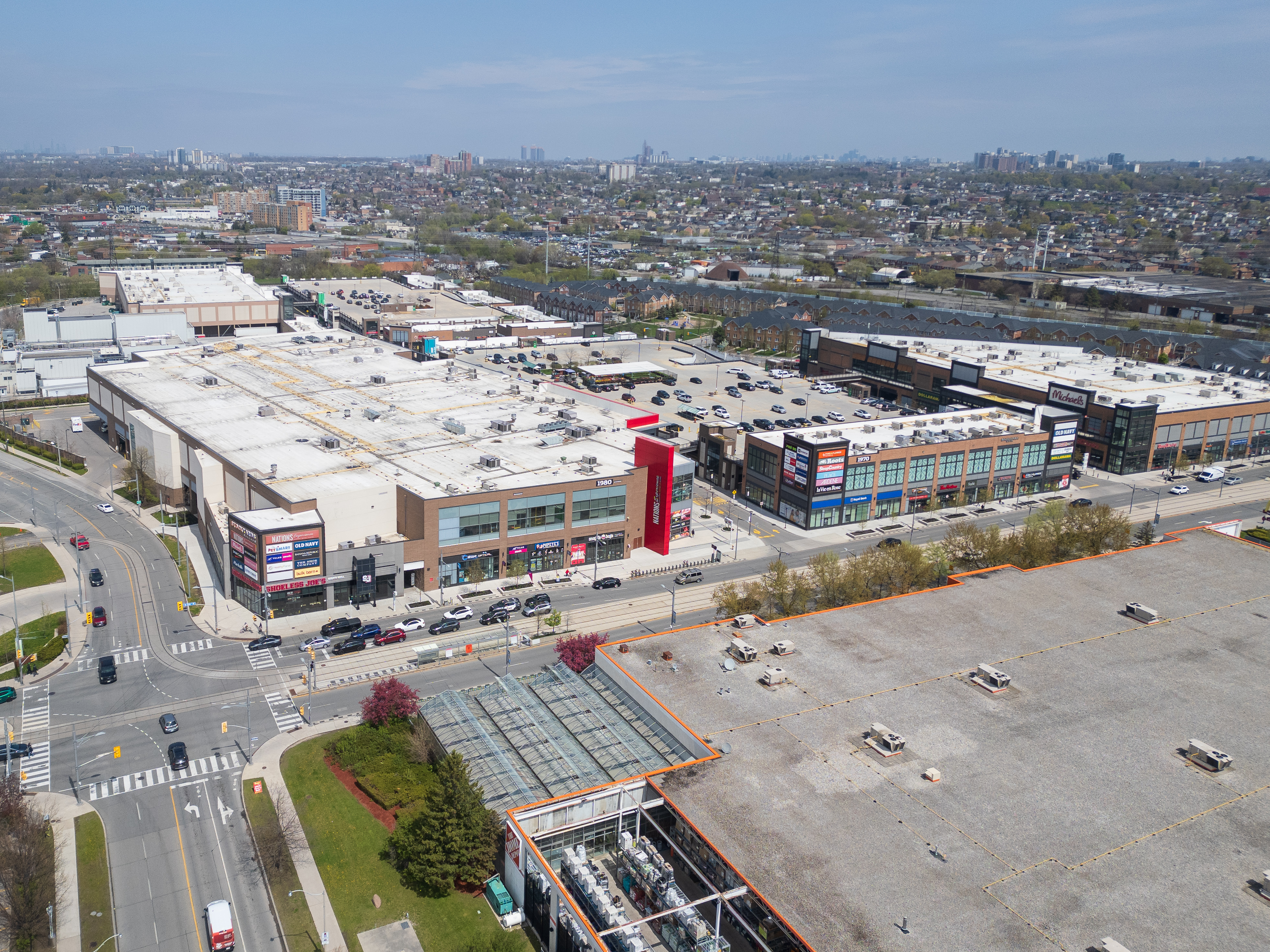
Aerial Shot of CPKC West Toronto Yard

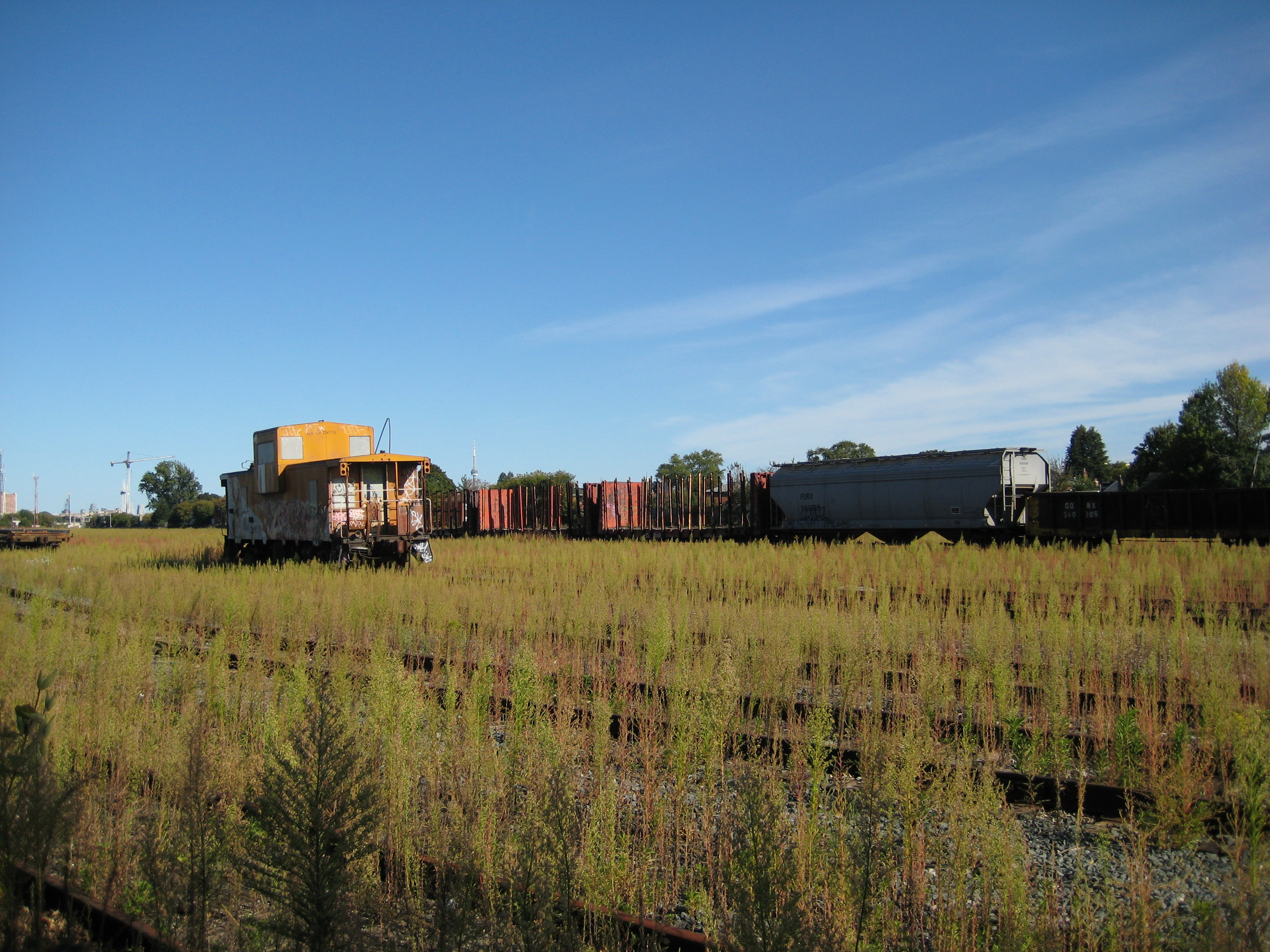
The West Toronto Yard

CPKC West Toronto Yard is a small marshalling yard for the Canadian Pacific Kansas City on the Galt Subdivision in Toronto, Ontario, Canada. The yard was built in 1882 to relieve stress at the Parkdale Yard and is located near Keele Street and Dundas Street West in The Junction. It was once the main yards for Toronto, but was replaced in that role in April 1964 by the CPR Toronto Yard in Agincourt. The roundhouse was demolished in 1998.

A Rona retail store stands on the site of the former roundhouse and shops. Additional buildings were located along Keele Street such as the car shops, but were demolished for the Keele Centre at 500-530 Keele Street around the 1970s. The turntable from the roundhouse and transfer table from the erecting shops were saved from destruction and relocated to a garden at the back of the Rona property.

Engines from West Toronto formerly served local industry. West Toronto Yard is primary used for storage and classification of CPR's industrial customers in the Guelph - Islington corridor. CPR's premier piggyback service, the Expressway originally was sited at West Toronto, but was relocated to Hornby when volume grew too large.

When West Toronto became overcrowded in 1913, an additional yard was built immediately to the west. Called CPR Lambton Yard, it stretches from Runnymede Road to Scarlett Road. Runnymede Road divides the yards. Plans to build a hump class yard on the expanded site were cancelled around 1950. The search for a new site for a new main and modern hump classification yard eventually resulted in the selection of the Agincourt location.

== See also ==
- John Street Roundhouse
- CNR Spadina Roundhouse
