= CPKC Toronto Yard =

Railway facility in Canada

Coordinates: 43.8039°N 79.2495°W

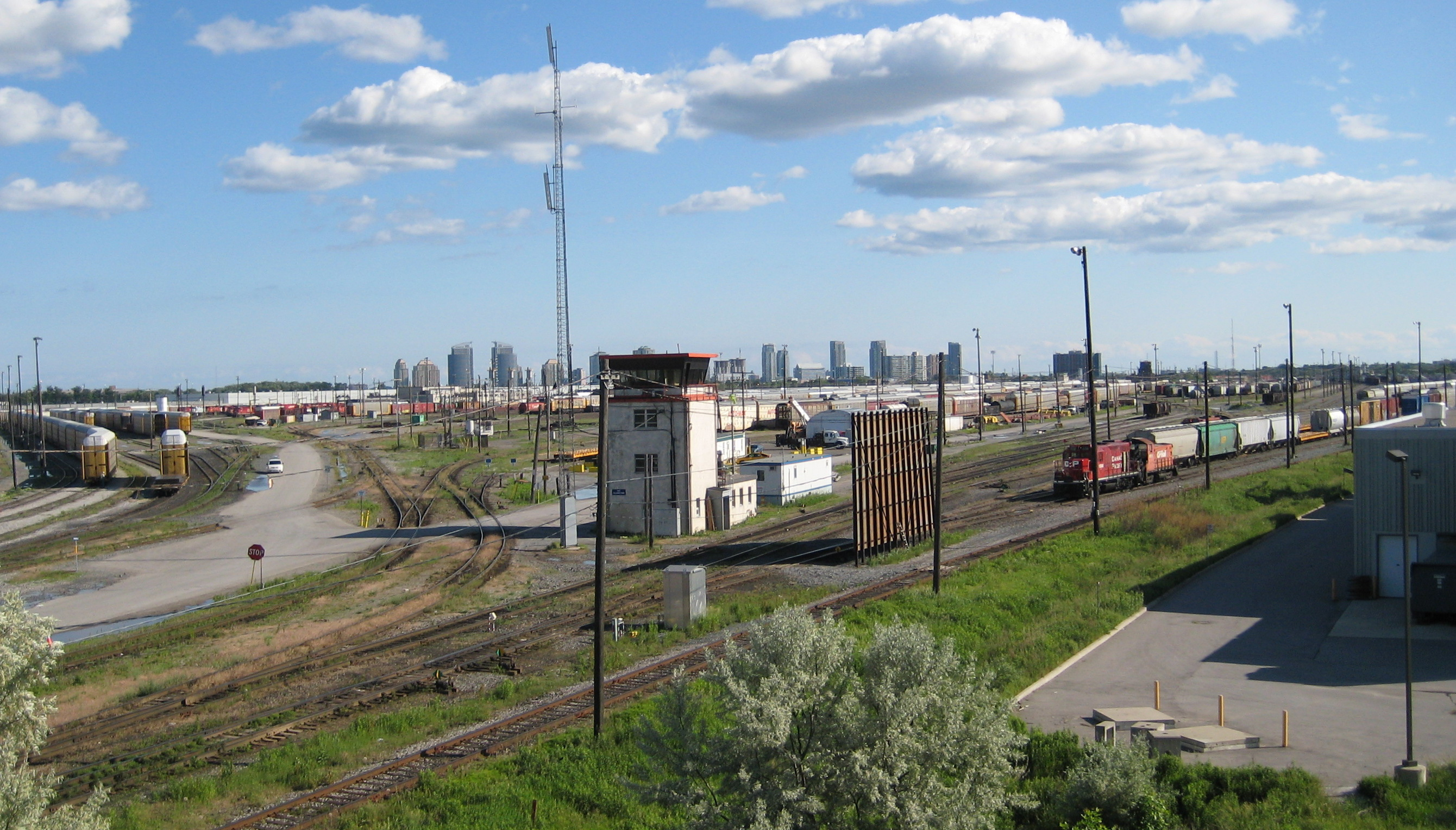
The CPR Toronto Yard in 2010

CPKC Toronto Yard is a railway facility located in northeast Toronto, Ontario, Canada owned by the Canadian Pacific Kansas City. It is often incorrectly referred to as Agincourt Yard because it is located in Agincourt, a neighbourhood of Toronto.

One of the largest marshalling yards in Canada (432 acres site with 90 miles (140 km) of track and 311 switches), the Toronto Yard is used to switch freight cars.

Railway repair equipment is stored along the east side of the facility.

== Operations ==
The yard is divided up into the following (North to South): A Yard, consisting of ten tracks. B Yard, consisting of ten tracks. C Yard, formerly consisting of 72 classification tracks. D Yard, former railcar repair shop area. Partially taken over by the diesel shop. E Yard, Diesel Shop tracks. F Yard, consisting of ten tracks. G Yard, consisting of five tracks.

== History ==
Prior to being a railyard, the area was home to farms in the area known as Brown's Corners. A large hill, Fisher's Hill, overlooked the area and was leveled to prepare the building of the railyard. Highland Creek flows in the northeast corner.

Opened in April 1964, the facility was designed as a hump yard, and is bounded by Sheppard Avenue to the south, McCowan Road to the west, Markham Road to the east and Finch Avenue to the north.

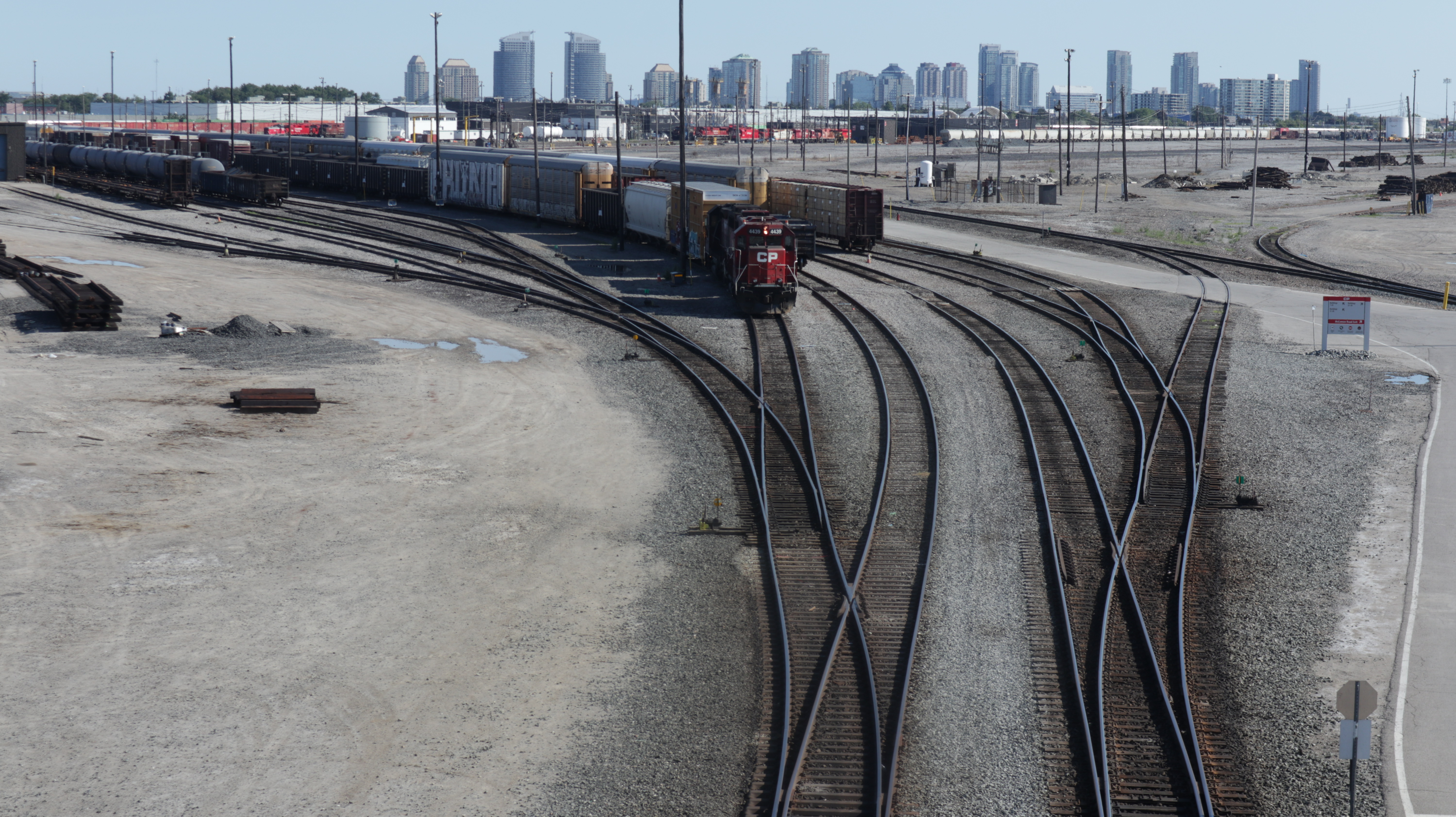
Toronto Yard in 2022

This yard replaced the old CPR Lambton Yard and West Toronto Yard as the main freight marshalling yard. The yard can be accessed from Markham and McCowan Roads.

After Hunter Harrison became CEO of Canadian Pacific in 2012 the hump and the classification yard in Toronto was ordered to close. After the closure the east end of the 72 classification tracks remained, but during Hunter Harrison's tenure they were eventually removed.

In August 2022, some workers went on stoppage and picketed at the yard.

In April 2023, The Canadian Pacific merged with Kansas City Southern to create the Canadian Pacific Kansas City Railway. Toronto Yard now has most of its CPR signage replaced by CPKC signage.

== See also ==
- Facilities of the Canadian Pacific Railway
