= Houma North railway station =

Railway station in Linfen, Shanxi

Houma North 侯马北

General information
- Location: Houma, Linfen, Shanxi; China
- Coordinates: 35.6464496°N 111.3695287°E
- Line: Datong–Puzhou railway
Location

Houma North railway station (Chinese: 侯马北站) is a freight railway station in Houma, Linfen, Shanxi, China. It is an intermediate stop on the Datong–Puzhou railway. It is said to be the largest marshalling yard in North China.
