= Luther Yard =

Rail yard in St. Louis, Missouri, U.S.

Coordinates: 38°41′38″N 90°13′08″W

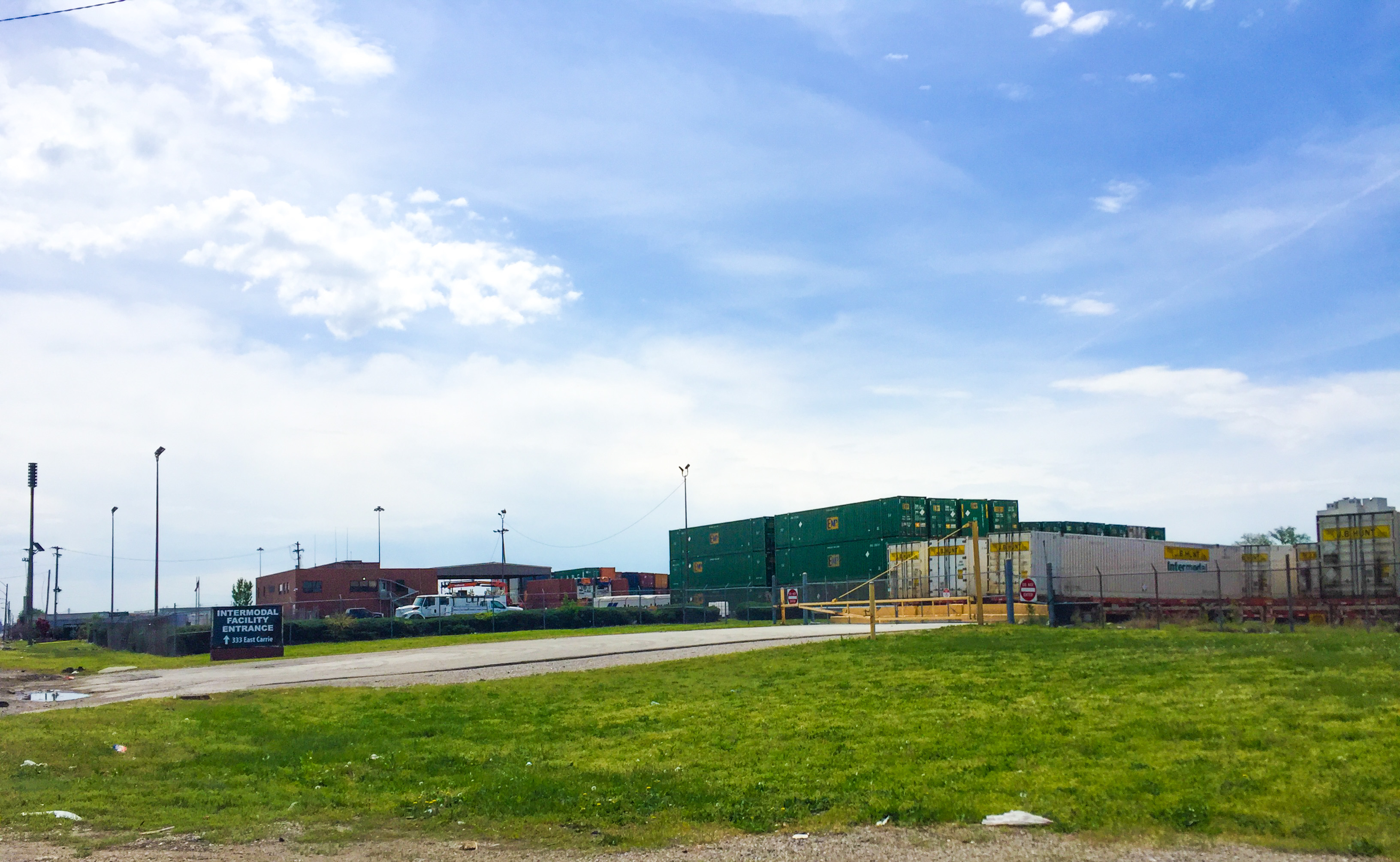
A view of the Luther Yard facility from Hall Street

Luther Yard is a rail yard operated by the Norfolk Southern Railway in St. Louis, Missouri. It is located at 333 East Carrie Avenue, several miles north of downtown.

The yard was built in 1890 by the Wabash Railroad, a precursor line to the Norfolk Southern, which used it as its central classification yard. Built on 30.65 acres of land, the yard included a 15-stall roundhouse, coal chutes, a sand house, an oil house, scales. The railroad spent $71,400.48 on the yard in fiscal year 1890.

As of 2013, 63 trains pass through the yard each week.
