= West Oakland Yards =

Rail yard facility in Oakland, California, USA

Coordinates: 37.818°N 122.298°W

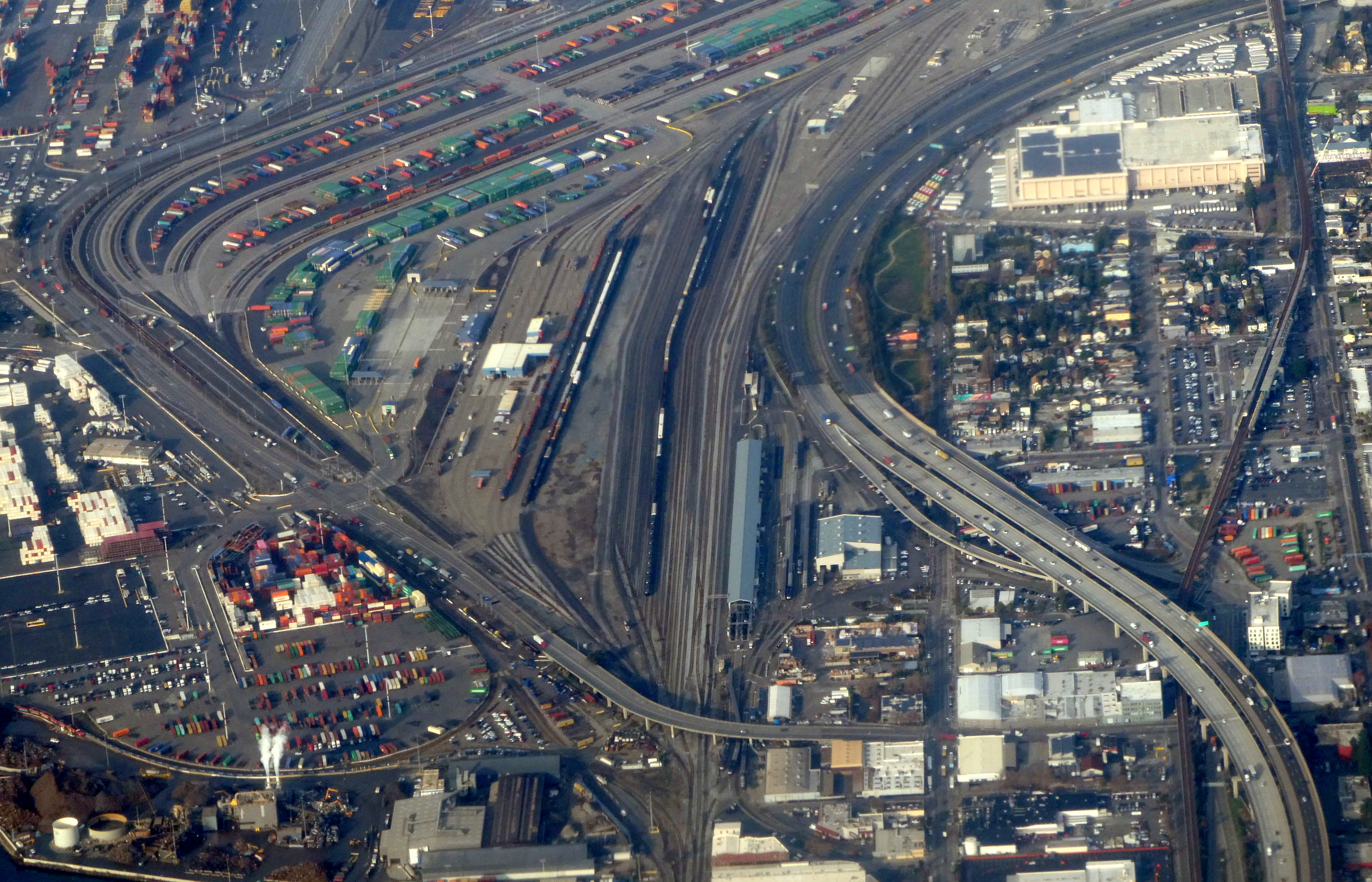
Aerial view of the West Oakland Yards in December 2022

The West Oakland Yards are a rail yard facility in West Oakland, Oakland, California, in the United States. Formerly a major facility for the Southern Pacific Railroad, the yards have been operated by Union Pacific Railroad since 1996.

Under SP, the yards were home to a variety of railroad facilities, including a signal shop and a creosoting plant.

SP was said to "dominate" West Oakland with its "massive switching and maintenance yards, roundhouses, car assembly and repair shops, creosoting plant, and shipyards".

The Amtrak Oakland Maintenance Facility opened in the yards in 2004.
