= South Hamilton Yard =

Overview
- Other name(s): Baltimore and Ohio Railroad Pit Yard
- Status: Operating main line & sidings, yard abandoned
- Owner: CSX Transportation
- Locale: Lindenwald Hamilton, Ohio

Service
- System: CSX Transportation
- Services: CSX Transportation Cincinnati Terminal Subdivision
- Operator(s): CSX Transportation

History
- Closed: 1988

Technical
- Number of tracks: 2 Main Line & 2 sidings
- Track gauge: 1,435 mm (4 ft 8 1/2 in) standard gauge

Pit Yard, also known as South Hamilton Yard, was a classification yard located in Hamilton, Ohio. It was first built by the Cincinnati, Hamilton and Dayton Railway, and subsequently became part of the Baltimore and Ohio Railroad, followed by CSX Transportation in 1980. It was abandoned in the late 1980s apart from two sidings along the main line, which is part of the Cincinnati Terminal Subdivision.

The yard was long the site of an infamous grade crossing, known as the "South Hamilton death-trap crossing". This grade crossing was the site of numerous fatal accidents between motorists and trains. It was finally replaced by an overpass in 2018, resolving an issue that had plagued the city of Hamilton for close to 100 years.

== See also ==
- Cincinnati Terminal Subdivision
- Toledo Subdivision
- Louisville Division
