= Amtrak Oakland Maintenance Facility =

Coordinates: 37.8013°N 122.2934°W

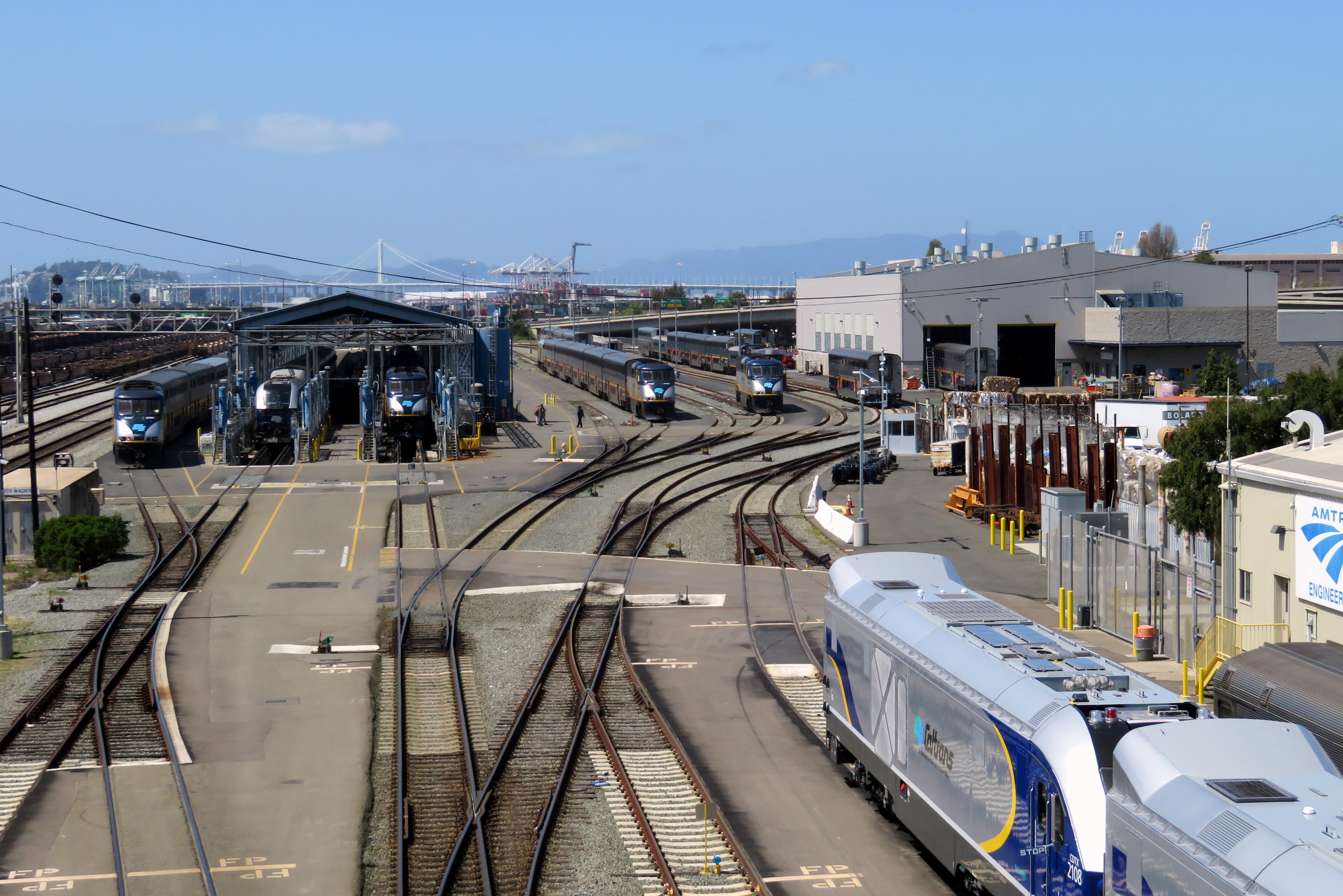
Oakland Maintenance Facility viewed from Adeline Street in April 2018

The Amtrak Oakland Maintenance Facility is a passenger train servicing depot in Oakland, California. It is located on the Union Pacific Railroad Niles Subdivision, 1.8 track miles (2.9 km) north of Oakland–Jack London Square station. It provides maintenance for Amtrak's regional and long-distance trains in northern California, including the California Zephyr, Capitol Corridor, and Gold Runner.

== History ==
Work began on the facility in 2002, and it opened in October, 2004. It replaced a small, 1916-built train servicing building and yard which were conspicuously placed in the middle of Union Pacific's West Oakland Yards at the Port of Oakland. Prior to completion, Capitol Corridor trains had to be taken to Los Angeles for repairs. Total construction cost of the project was $71 million (equivalent to $121 million in 2025), $38 million of which was contributed by the California Department of Transportation with the rest provided by Amtrak.
