= CPR Parkdale Yard =

CPR Parkdale Yard was a Canadian Pacific Railway marshalling yard and repair facility in Toronto built during the 1870s by predecessor Credit Valley Railway. The small facility, located at King and Dufferin Streets, became inadequate and the shops facility closed in 1890. It was replaced by West Toronto Yard.

The site on the northside of East Liberty Street of the old yard has been taken over by residential condo towers and low rise townhouses (Liberty Central by the Lake), as well as Bill Johnston Park.
