= CPKC Kinnear Yard =

CPKC Kinnear Yard is a railway facility in Hamilton, Ontario. Still in use, the city had been trying to convert the facility to other uses, however this is no longer the case. The yard is located opposite from Gage Park.
