= Chicago and Southern Railroad =

Overview
- Dates of operation: 1874–1878
- Successor: Chicago and State Line Railway

Technical
- Track gauge: 1,435 mm (4 ft 8 1/2 in)
- Length: 20 miles (32 km)

The Chicago and Southern Railroad built a rail line in northeastern Illinois, extending south from Chicago to Thornton. It now mainly forms part of the Grand Trunk Western Railroad, while the north end has been operated by the Atchison, Topeka and Santa Fe Railway, the Illinois Northern Railway, and most recently the Central Illinois Railroad.

== History ==
The Chicago and Southern Railroad was incorporated on April 7, 1874, and was opened in 1876 under lease to the Chicago, Danville and Vincennes Railroad, which used it as its access to Chicago. (Prior to 1876 the CD&V had entered Chicago via trackage rights over the Columbus, Chicago and Indiana Central Railway from Dolton, several miles north of Thornton, where the CD&V ended.) The Chicago and Southern headed northwest from Thornton, crossing the Illinois Central Railroad at Harvey, the Chicago, Rock Island and Pacific Railroad at Blue Island, and the Chicago and Alton Railroad at Corwith before curving east along 26th Street, crossing the Columbus, Chicago and Indiana Central Railway and ending just west of Western Avenue at a junction with the Lumber District of the Chicago, Burlington and Quincy Railroad. The short-lived narrow-gauge Chicago, Millington and Western Railway also had a track along 26th Street.

The CD&V was reorganized in 1877 as the Chicago and Eastern Illinois Railroad, and on July 31, 1878, the Chicago and Southern was sold at foreclosure to representatives of the Grand Trunk Railway, which reorganized it as the Chicago and State Line Railway. In the next two years, the Grand Trunk completed a line between Port Huron, Michigan and Chicago, consolidating its components on April 6, 1880, to form new subsidiary Chicago and Grand Trunk Railway. To provide improved access to Chicago, the Grand Trunk Junction Railway was incorporated in 1880 and opened in 1881, branching off the old line at Elsdon and following 49th Street east past the Union Stock Yards to the Chicago and Western Indiana Railroad, a terminal railroad that was later controlled jointly by the Grand Trunk Junction and four other railroads.

The Chicago and St. Louis Railway opened a line between Pekin and Chicago on December 21, 1885, initially using the Chicago and Grand Trunk between Corwith and the end in 26th Street. The Atchison, Topeka and Santa Fe Railroad, which had acquired the Chicago and St. Louis in December 1886 through subsidiary Chicago, Santa Fe and California Railway, bought the line between Elsdon and 26th Street on July 20, 1887. Santa Fe subsidiary Atchison, Topeka and Santa Fe Railroad in Chicago completed a more direct entrance to Chicago in 1888, and in 1902 the Illinois Northern Railway, controlled by the International Harvester Company, which owned a plant near 26th Street, leased the entire line except for short sections at the junctions at Corwith and Elsdon. The Santa Fe also retained its Corwith Yard between these junctions.

The Santa Fe eventually bought control of the Illinois Northern, and merged it in 1975. Successor Burlington Northern and Santa Fe Railway leased the line north of Corwith to new shortline Central Illinois Railroad in 2000.

As for the line south of Elsdon, it remains owned and operated by the Grand Trunk Western Railroad as part of its Elsdon Subdivision.

== See also ==
- List of defunct Illinois railroads
