= Galesburg Yard =

Railway yard in Illinois, USA

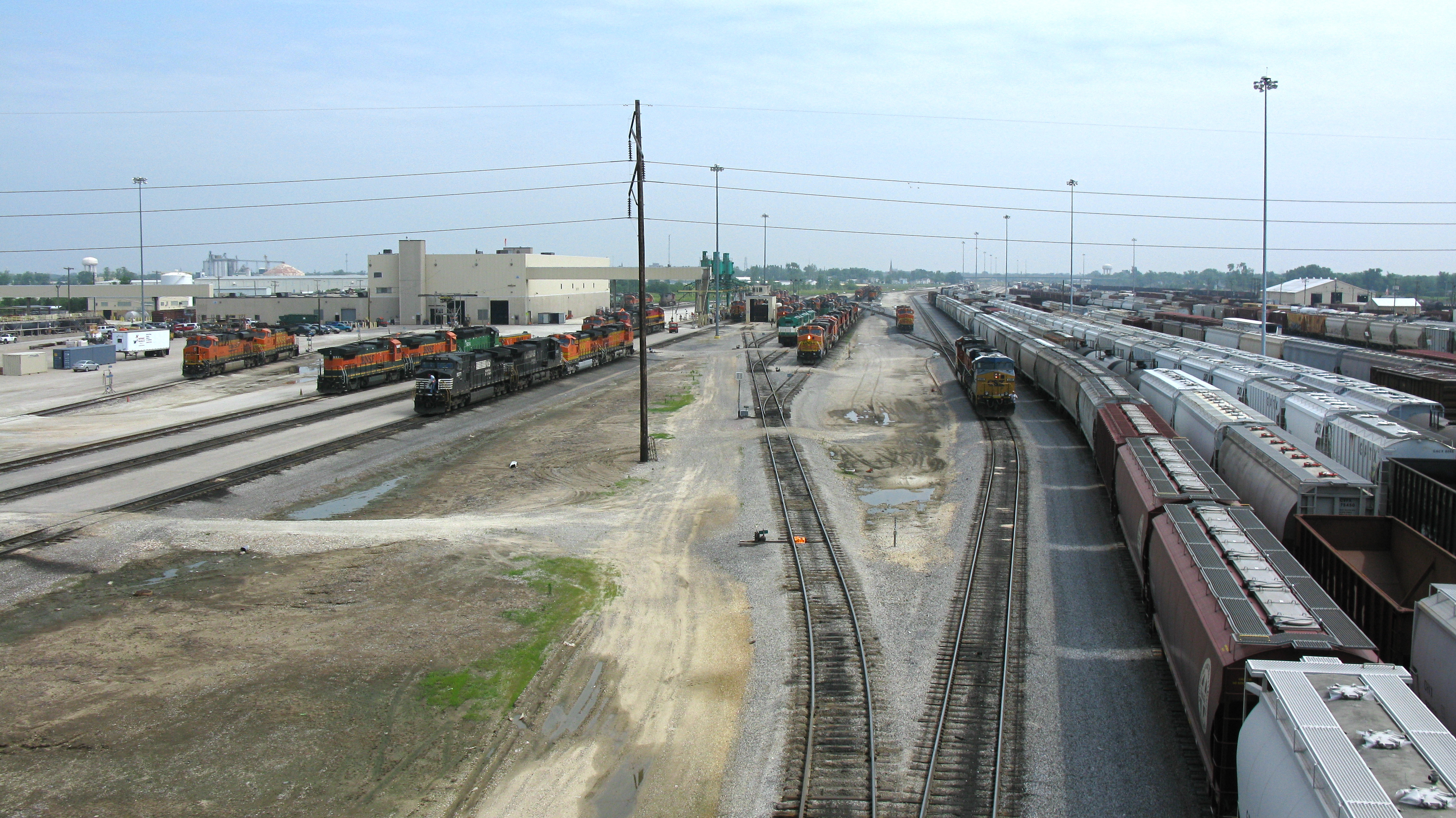
- Northern section with depot (left, facing north)

General information
- Location: Galesburg, Illinois; United States

Other information
- Classification: Classification yard

History
- Opened: 1905
Location
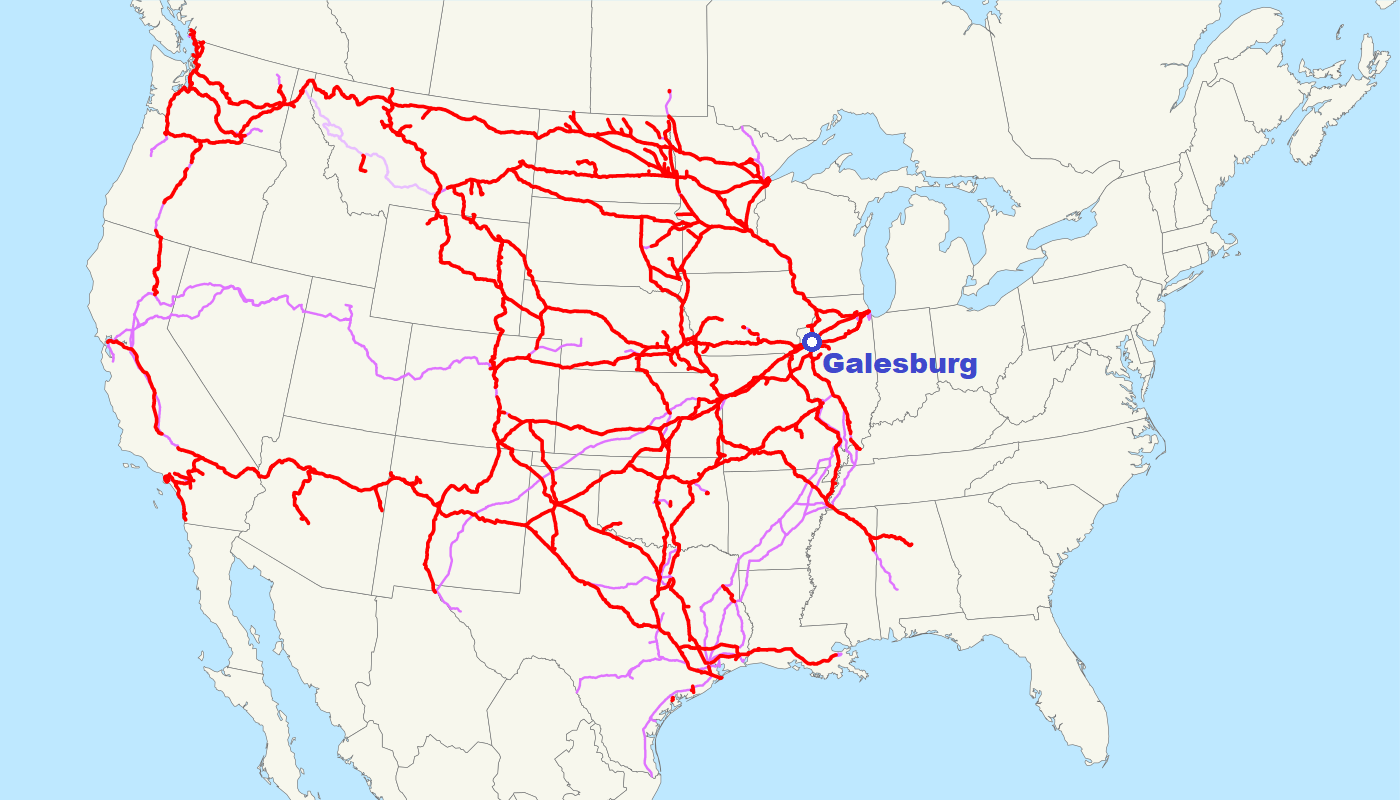
- BNSF Railway

The Galesburg Yard is a classification yard of the BNSF Railway south of Galesburg in Illinois. It dates back to a goods and classification yard of the Chicago, Burlington and Quincy Railroad (CB&Q), which from 1905 developed into one of the largest classification yards in the USA. At the beginning of the 20th century, Galesburg developed into CB&Q's most important railroad junction, with the main lines from Saint Paul to St. Louis and Kansas City (north-south) and from Chicago to Omaha and Kansas City (east-west) running through it. Nearly all CB&Q's passenger and freight trains passed through Galesburg, where there was also a large railroad depot with several roundhouses.

The CB&Q was absorbed by the Burlington Northern Railroad (BN) in 1970, which modernized the yard until 1984. In 1995, the BN merged with the Atchison, Topeka and Santa Fe Railway to form today's BNSF Railway (Burlington Northern Santa Fe), which expanded the Galesburg Yard to 62 directional tracks by 1997 due to its importance for the newly created network. By 2004, these were reduced to 48 to enlarge the entry group. After the Argentine Yard in Kansas City and the Northtown Yard in Minneapolis, it is now the third largest classification yard in the BNSF Railway network.

== History ==
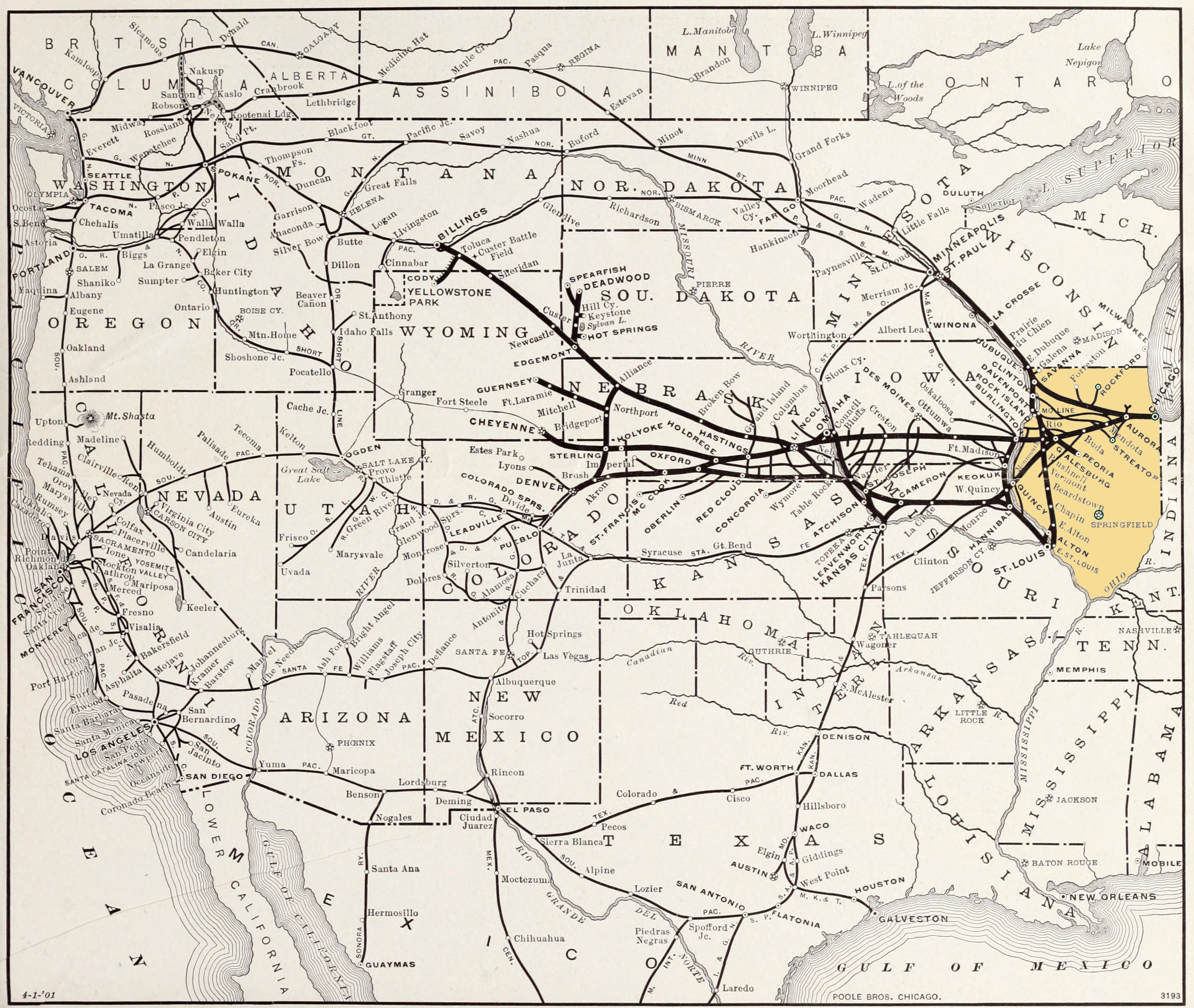
CB&Q railway network around 1901

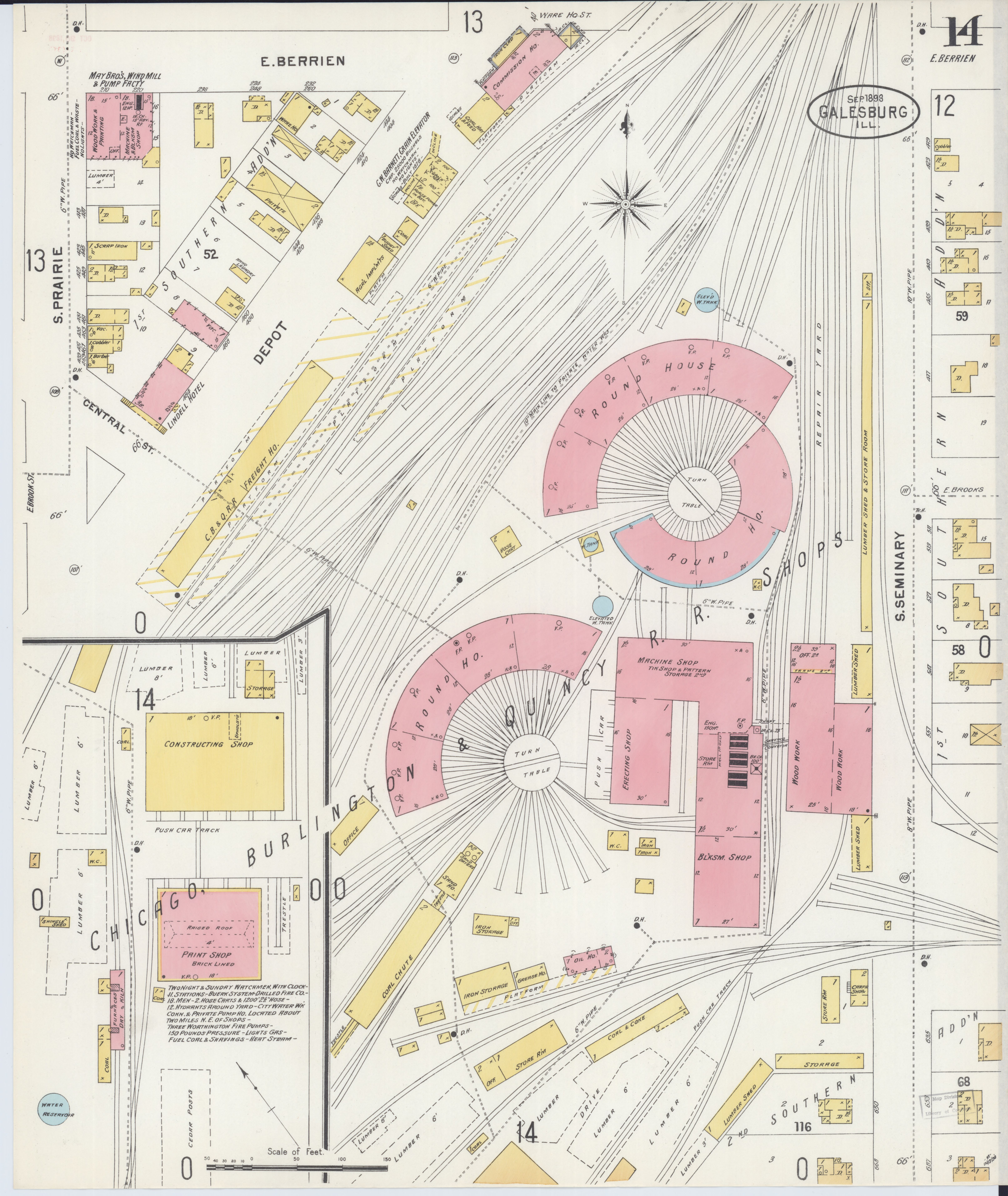
Roundhouse in 1898

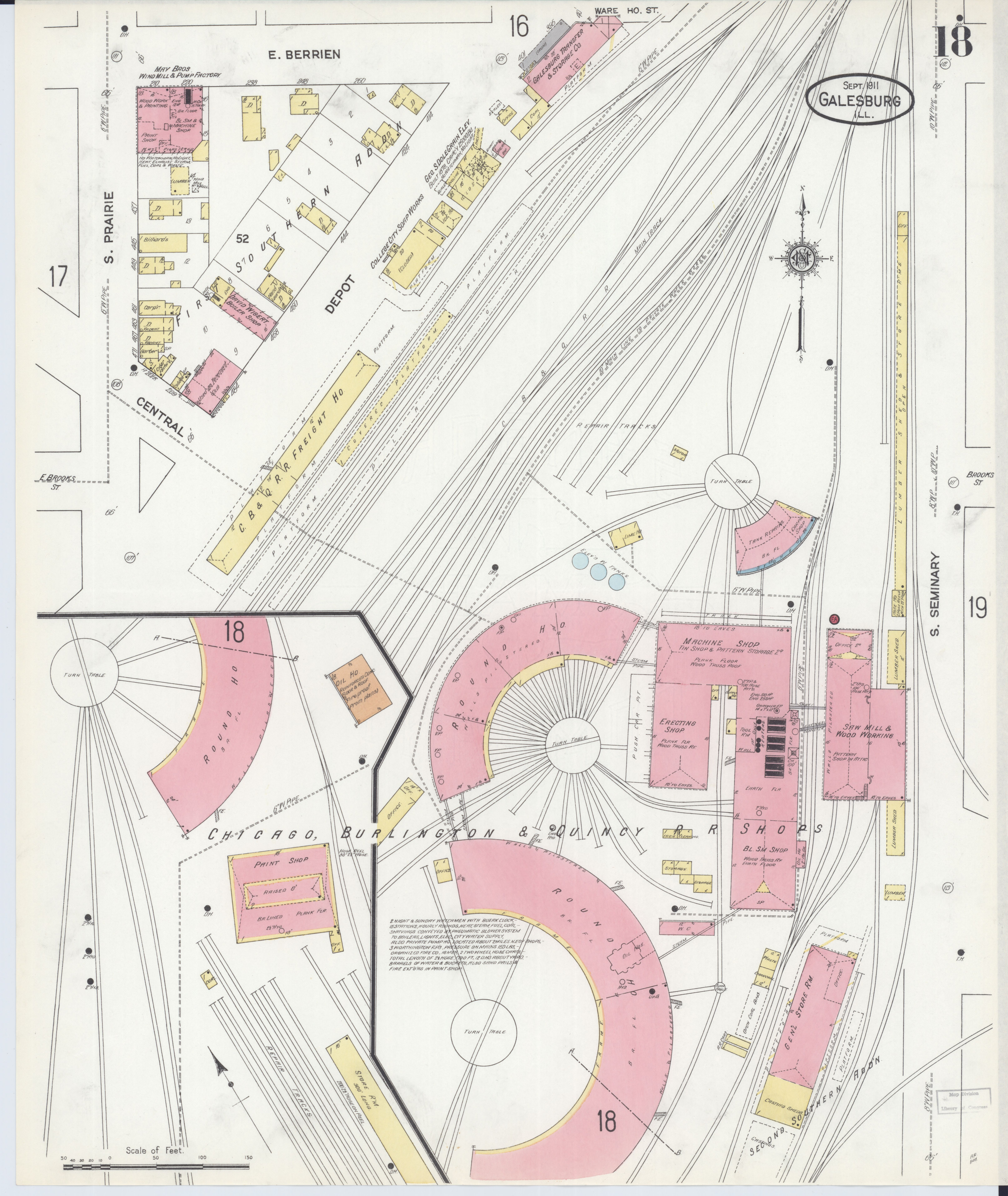
Roundhouse in 1911

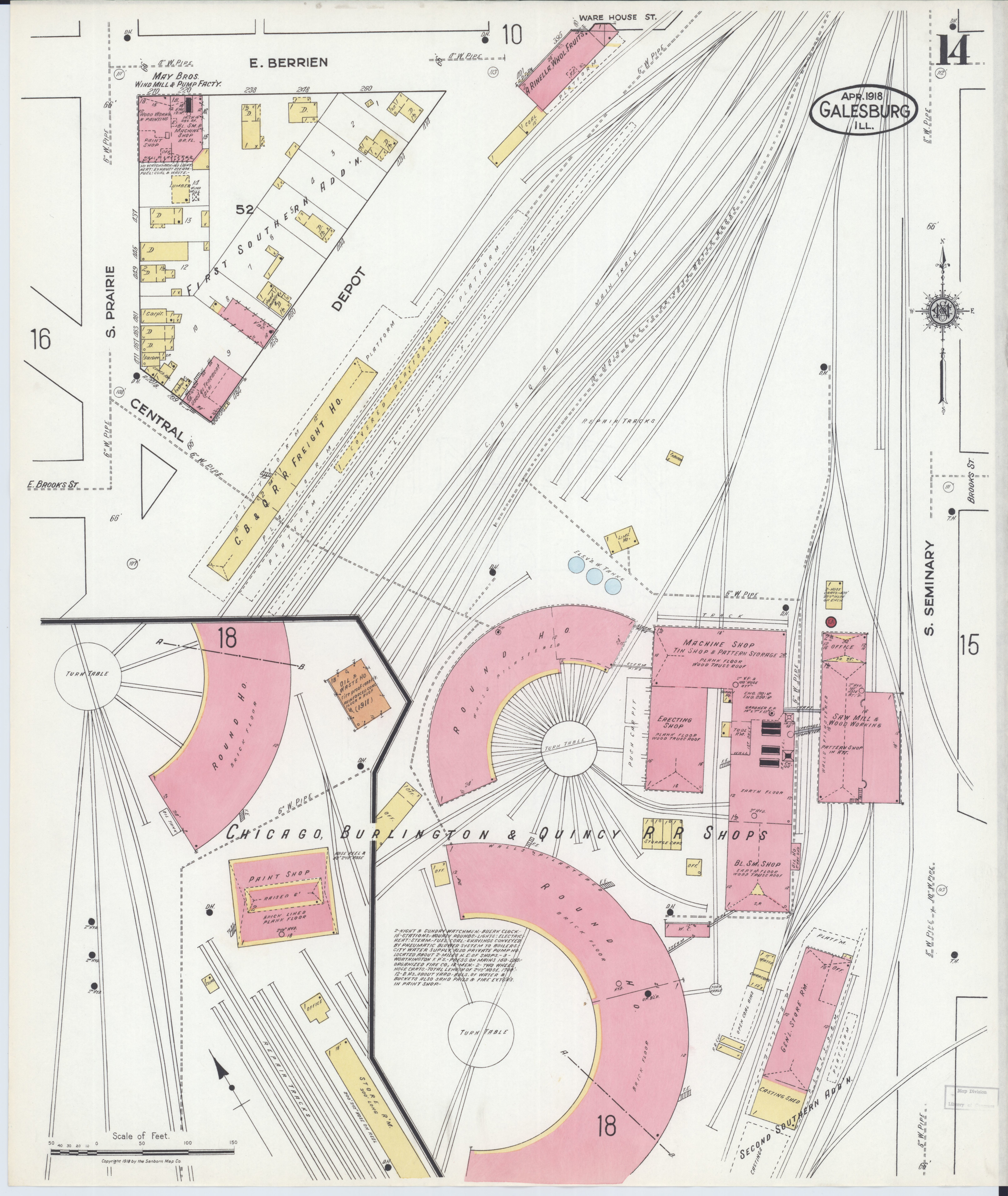
Roundhouse in 1918

In the early 1850s, the Chicago and Aurora Railroad extended its line further west towards Galesburg, reached by the end of 1854. James Frederick Joy later extended the network to the Mississippi River as far as Burlington and Quincy by acquiring smaller railroad companies. Subsequently, it expanded with the new Chicago, Burlington, and Quincy Railroad (CB&Q) to St. Paul in the north, St. Louis in the south, and the Missouri River as far west as Kansas City and Omaha and beyond. Joy created one of the most successful railroad companies of the 19th century in America, whose most important junction between the north-south and east-west connections was the city of Galesburg in Illinois.

In addition to a freight and passenger station, a large railroad depot with several roundhouses was built here, and was further expanded with the increase in rail traffic at the beginning of the 20th century. In addition, in 1905 the CB&Q built a large marshalling yard south of it, which extended over five kilometers along the connection to Quincy in the southwest. It consisted of two parallel flat yards with a hump for north and southbound traffic. Each of the successive railroad fields had six tracks in the entry group, 21 in the directional harp, and six in the exit group; the total track length of the classification yard was about 50 km.

In 1914, over 200 trains passed through Galesburg daily, 130 of which were freight trains. Up to 7000 freight wagons were reassembled daily at the classification yard, for which 32 switcher locomotives were used. A production facility for railroad ties has been located at the southern end of the classification yard since 1908, where the wooden ties for a large part of the CB&Q rail network were processed, impregnated, and stored. The annual processing volume here was 1.5 million ties, and the plant is now managed by Koppers.

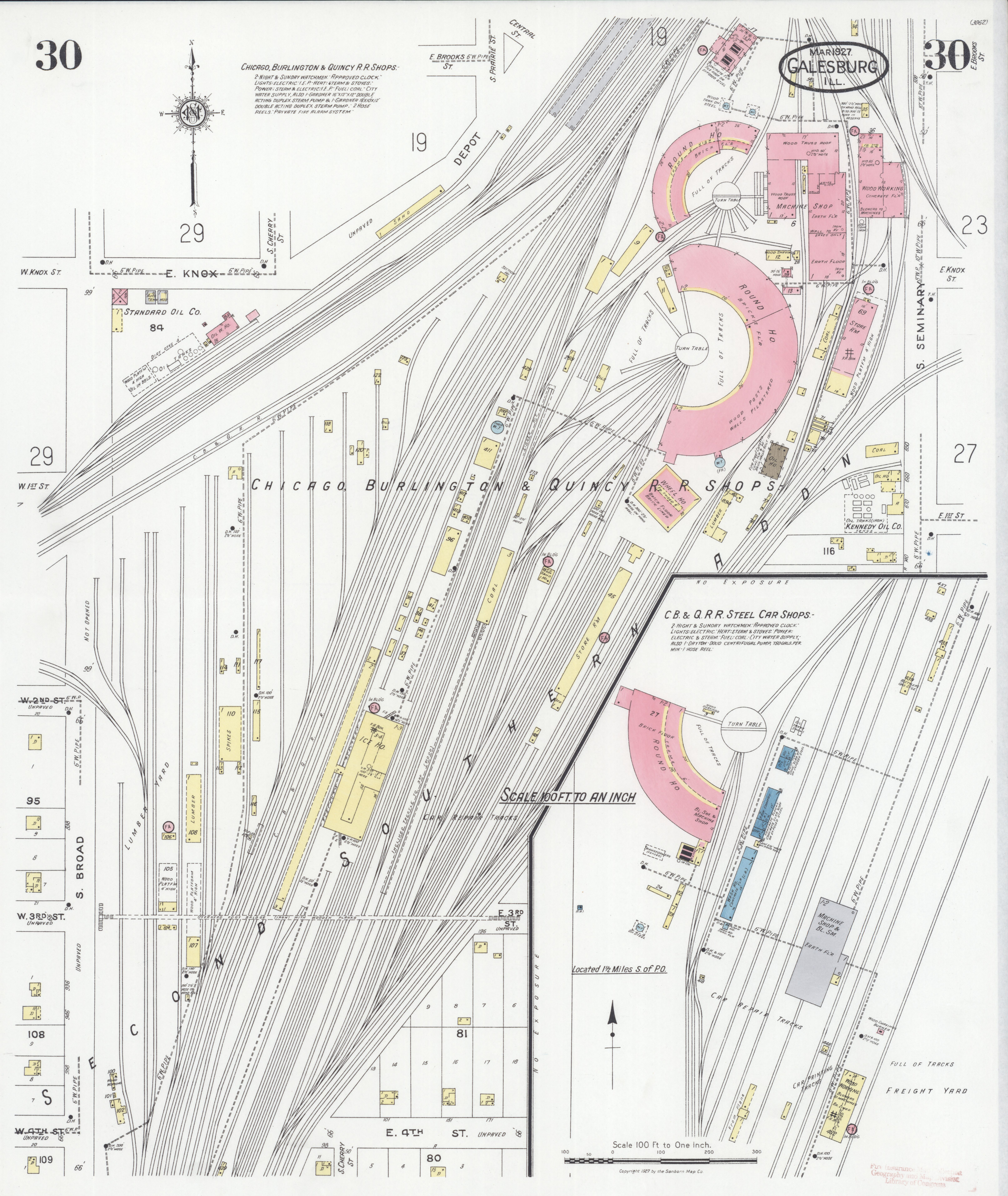
Roundhouse in 1927

CB&Q modernized the classification yard in the 1930s and 1940s and automated the operation of the two flat yards, which were expanded to a total of over 60 track kilometers. In 1947, around 6000 freight wagons were shunted daily, in 1963 the figure was still 5500. Despite the decline in passenger traffic, around 80 trains still passed through the Galesburg Yard every day in the 1960s. With the expansion of the road network in the USA, passenger and freight traffic increasingly shifted to the roads, which made the large rail networks in North America increasingly unprofitable from the 1960s onwards and subsequently led to several bankruptcies and mergers of railroad companies.

In 1970, the CB&Q merged with several other companies to form the Burlington Northern Railroad (BN), which modernized the marshalling yard again in the early 1980s. By 1984, the track systems had been completely rebuilt for 80 million US dollars, whereby the original separation of the flat stations according to traffic direction and the consecutive arrangement of the track fields were abandoned. This made longer tracks possible in the respective groups; the entry and exit groups (5 tracks each) were then located above the track harp (32 tracks) and partially enclosed it with their extensions. This arrangement still exists today and the trains are transferred between the groups via corresponding escape tracks. The maximum daily capacity after the conversion was 2500 freight wagons.

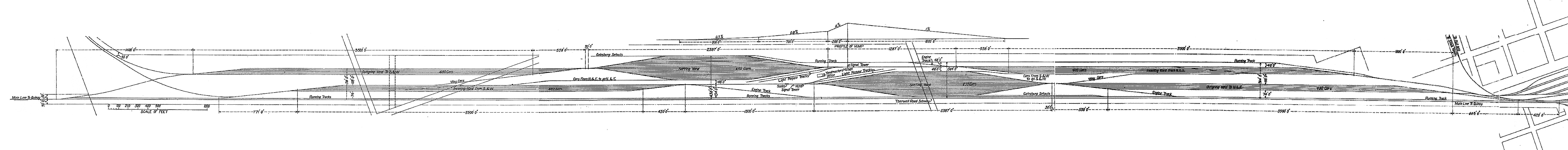
Diagram of the CB&Q classification yard from 1905 (south on the left, north on the right/Galesburg; figures in feet (′) and inches (″))

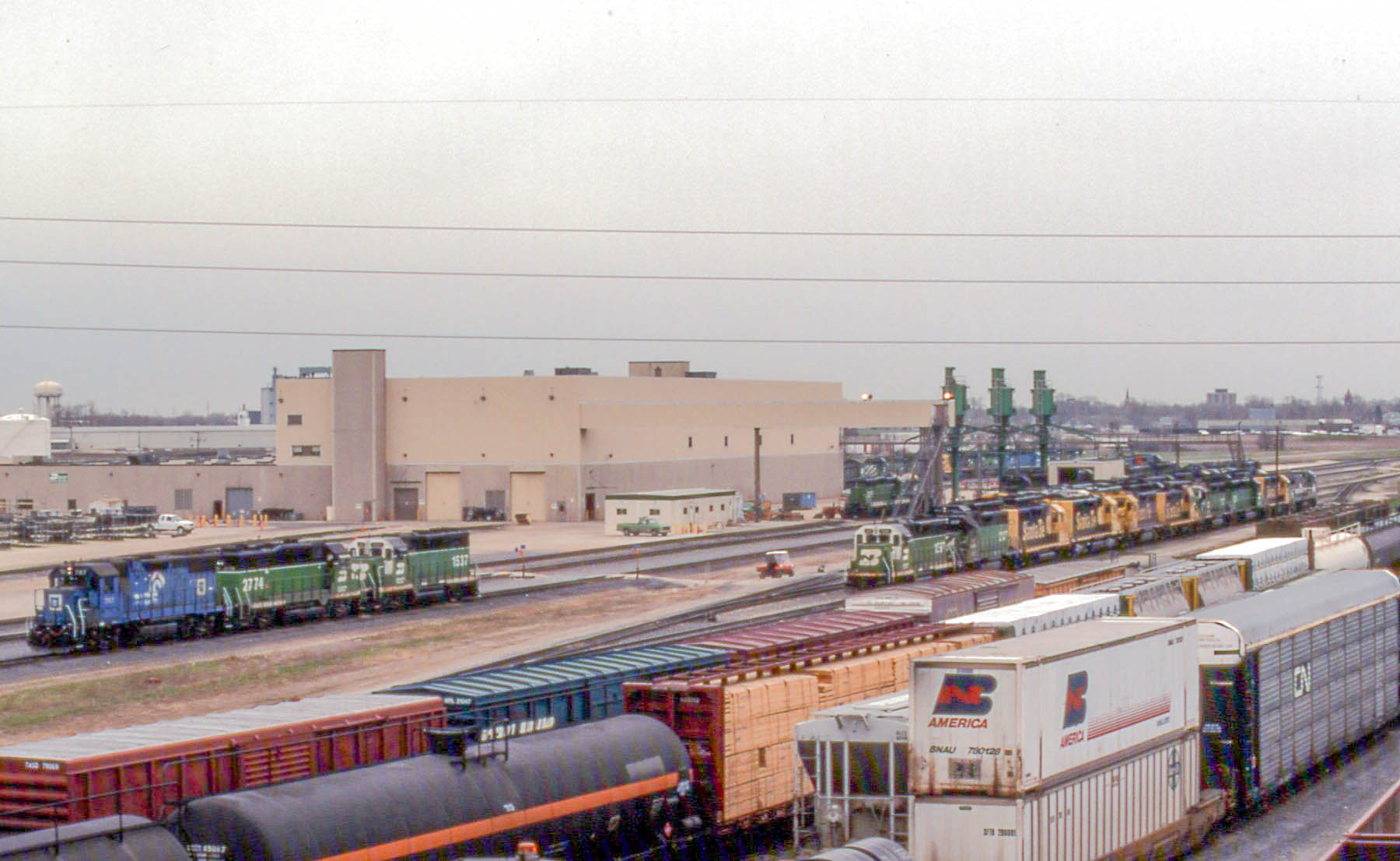
The depot for diesel locomotives from the 1980s.

As part of the conversion, the old depot at the northern end of the marshalling yard, including the roundhouse, was also demolished and replaced by a modern maintenance shed for diesel locomotives. The rectangular shed with two continuous tracks - as well as other facilities for refueling - are now located on the west side of the site, above the directional harp.

== Facility ==
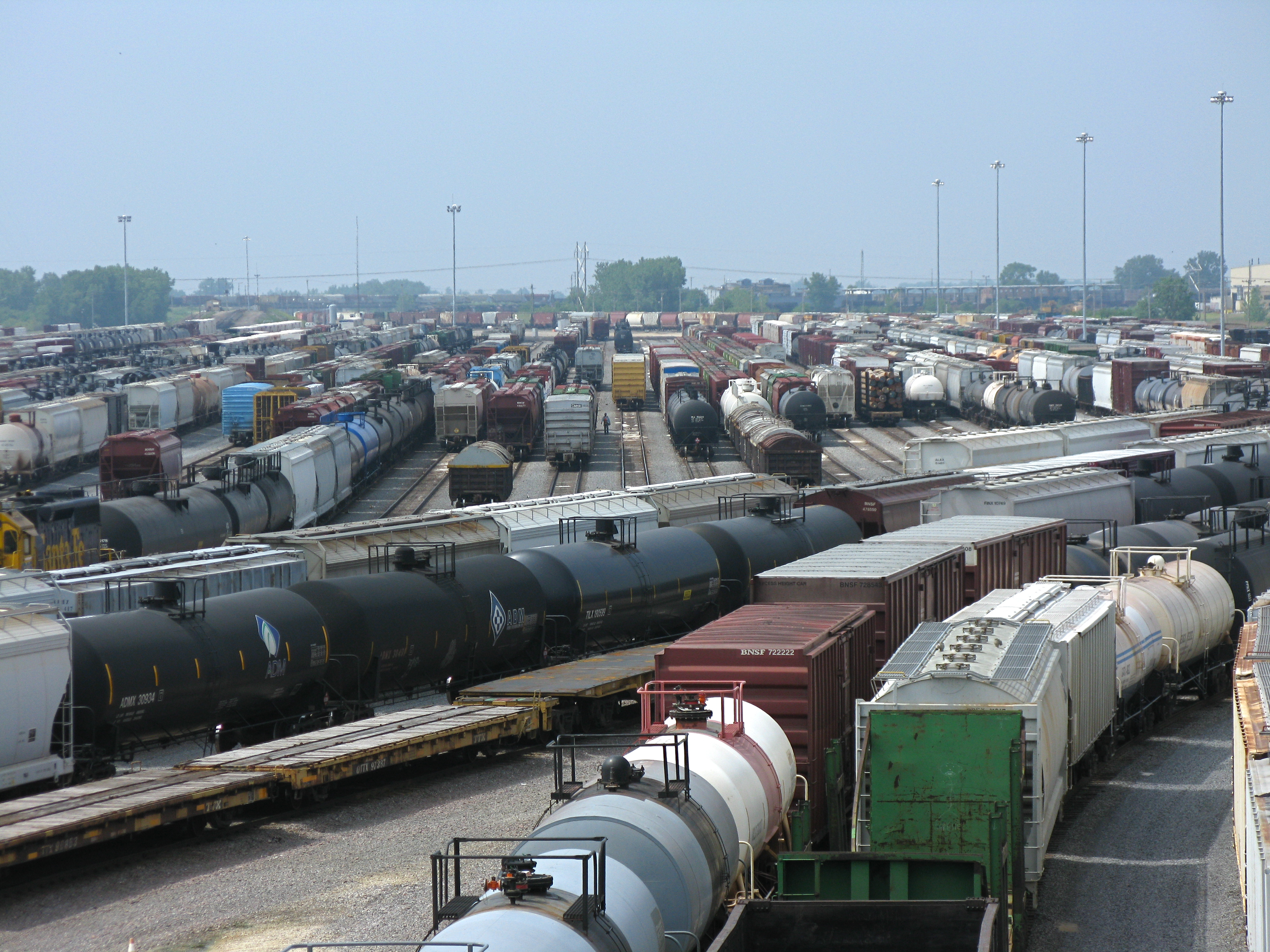
View towards the southwest of the tracks of the exit group, which enclose the directional harp (48 tracks) on the west side.

In 1995, the BN merged with the Atchison, Topeka and Santa Fe Railway to form today's BNSF Railway (Burlington Northern Santa Fe), which expanded the Galesburg Yard several times due to its importance for the newly created network, while retaining the existing layout of the track fields. The yard has occupied almost the same area for over 100 years, stretching from the southern outskirts of Galesburg over five kilometers to the southwest. Starting in the north, the tracks today are divided into the entry group and the exit group, each with eight tracks over two kilometers long, followed by the directional siding. The hump is located at the southern end of the group and the freight wagons are pushed northwards into the sidings. The directional group was enlarged to 48 tracks in 1996 and a year later to 62. The entry and exit groups were also given additional tracks. Another redesign took place in 2004, when 14 directional tracks were removed to extend the entry group to over 2.4 km.

On the west side, next to the exit group, there is the depot for the maintenance of diesel locomotives, and opposite on the east side, a smaller maintenance hall for freight wagons. There are also several bypass tracks on the east side, which are used for block trains with bulk goods. These do not require any en route maintenance and only the train crew is changed in Galesburg. At the southern end, there is also a maintenance area for rail service vehicles for track inspection and maintenance of way and the railroad tie plant now operated by Koppers.

== See also ==
- List of rail yards
- BNSF Railway classification yards: Argentine Yard, Barstow Yard, Corwith Yard, Northtown Yard
