= Argentine Yard =

Railway Yard in Kansas City, Kansas

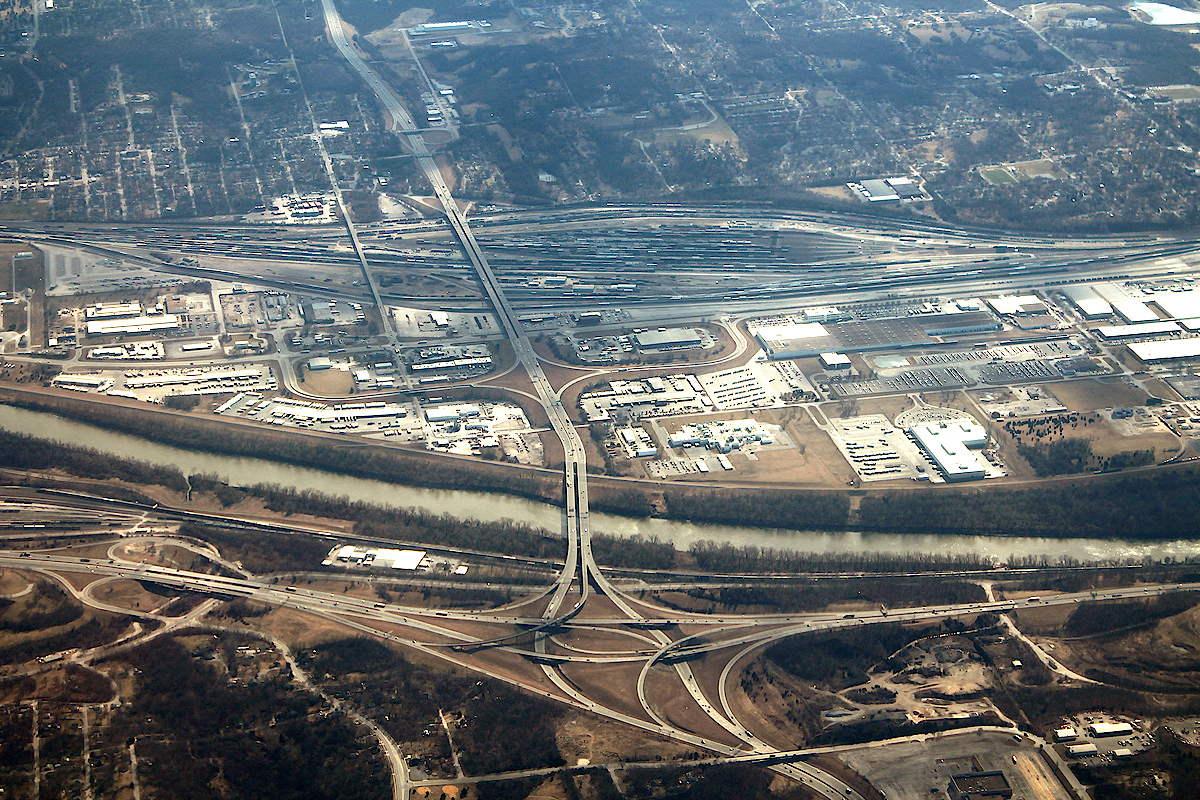
- Aerial view of the yard from 2016, looking south.

General information
- Location: Kansas City, Kansas, United States
- System: Classification Yard

History
- Opened: 1890
Location
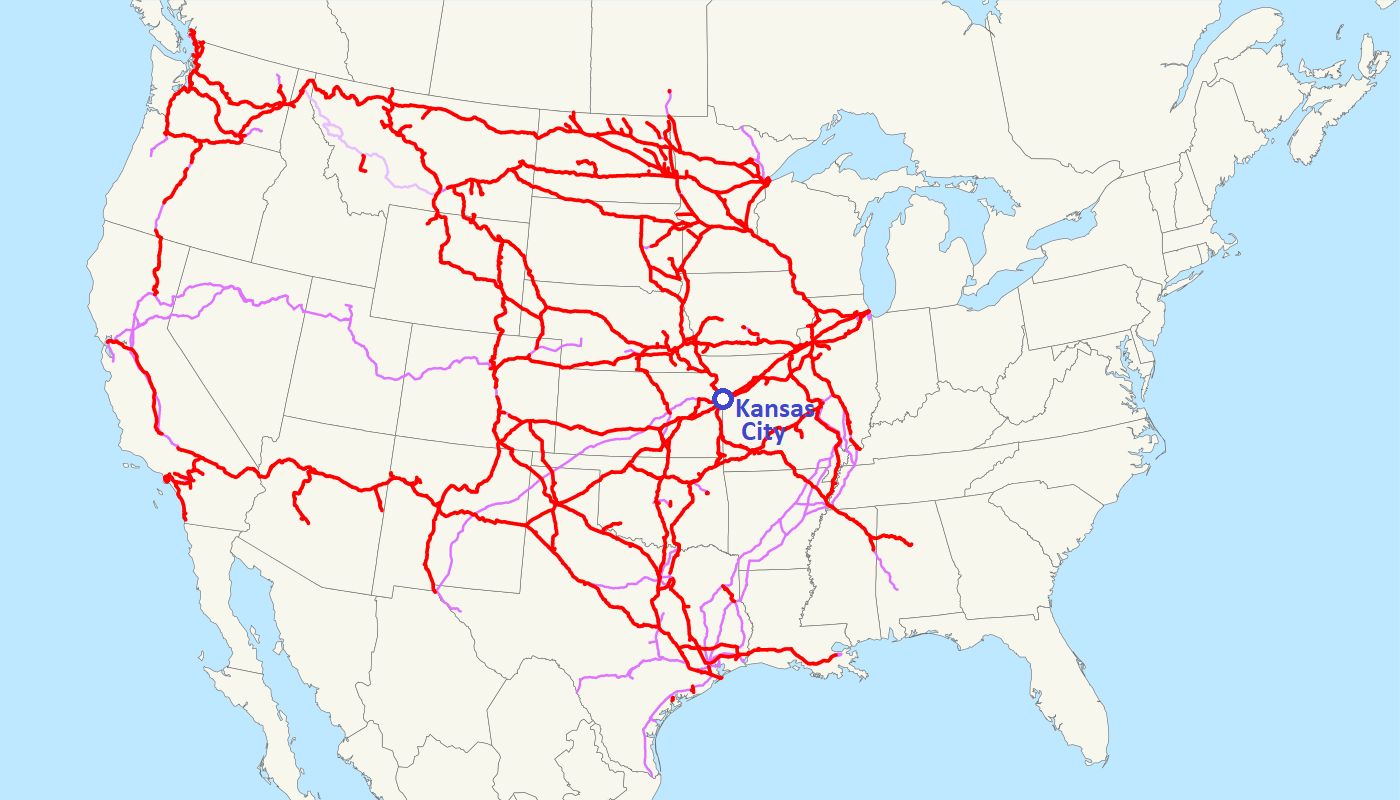

The Argentine Yard is a classification yard of the BNSF Railway in Kansas City, Kansas. With 60 directional tracks and an area of over 1.2 mi^{2}, it is the largest classification yard in the BNSF network. It is located between the Kansas River to the north and the Argentine district of Kansas City (Kansas) to the south, about six miles west of downtown Kansas City, Missouri.

The Argentine Yard is one of several large rail yards in the Kansas City metropolitan area operated by BNSF, Union Pacific, Norfolk Southern and Kansas City Southern. For several decades, the Kansas City metropolitan area was considered the largest railroad hub in the U.S. in terms of freight volume, with over 300 freight trains entering or leaving the metropolitan region daily. However, as of 2021, declines in network coal shipments have dropped Kansas City to second busiest and second by annual tonnage behind Chicago.

== History ==
In 1875, the Atchison, Topeka and Santa Fe Railway (AT&SF) began constructing the first railroad facilities in Argentine with warehouses and workshops, which were expanded into a passenger, freight and classification yard with over 25 mi of track by 1890. As at many other freight yards in the Midwest, the AT&SF also built a grain elevator with a large silo complex. The increasing mechanization of agriculture greatly increased the volume of grain handled in the 1920s, forcing the expansion of the complex's capacity from the original 1 million bushels to over 10 million bushels (about 350,000 m^{3}), creating the second largest facility in the United States; it was operated by the lessee Davis-Noland-Merrill Grain Company.

From the end of the 1940s, the Argentine Yard was expanded several times and converted into a central hub for the AT&SF with two large classification yards for freight transport to the west (westbound) and east (eastbound) by the end of the 1960s. With tracks over 210 mi long and a capacity of almost 15,000 freight cars, over 6,000 cars could be shunted here every day at peak times. The AT&SF employed between 2,000 and 3,000 people on the site in the 20th century and was the largest employer in Argentine. In 1995, the AT&SF merged with the Burlington Northern Railroad (BN) to form the Burlington Northern Santa Fe Railway (BNSF Railway), which demolished the silo complex in 1996 and completely rebuilt and modernized the rail yard by 1997.

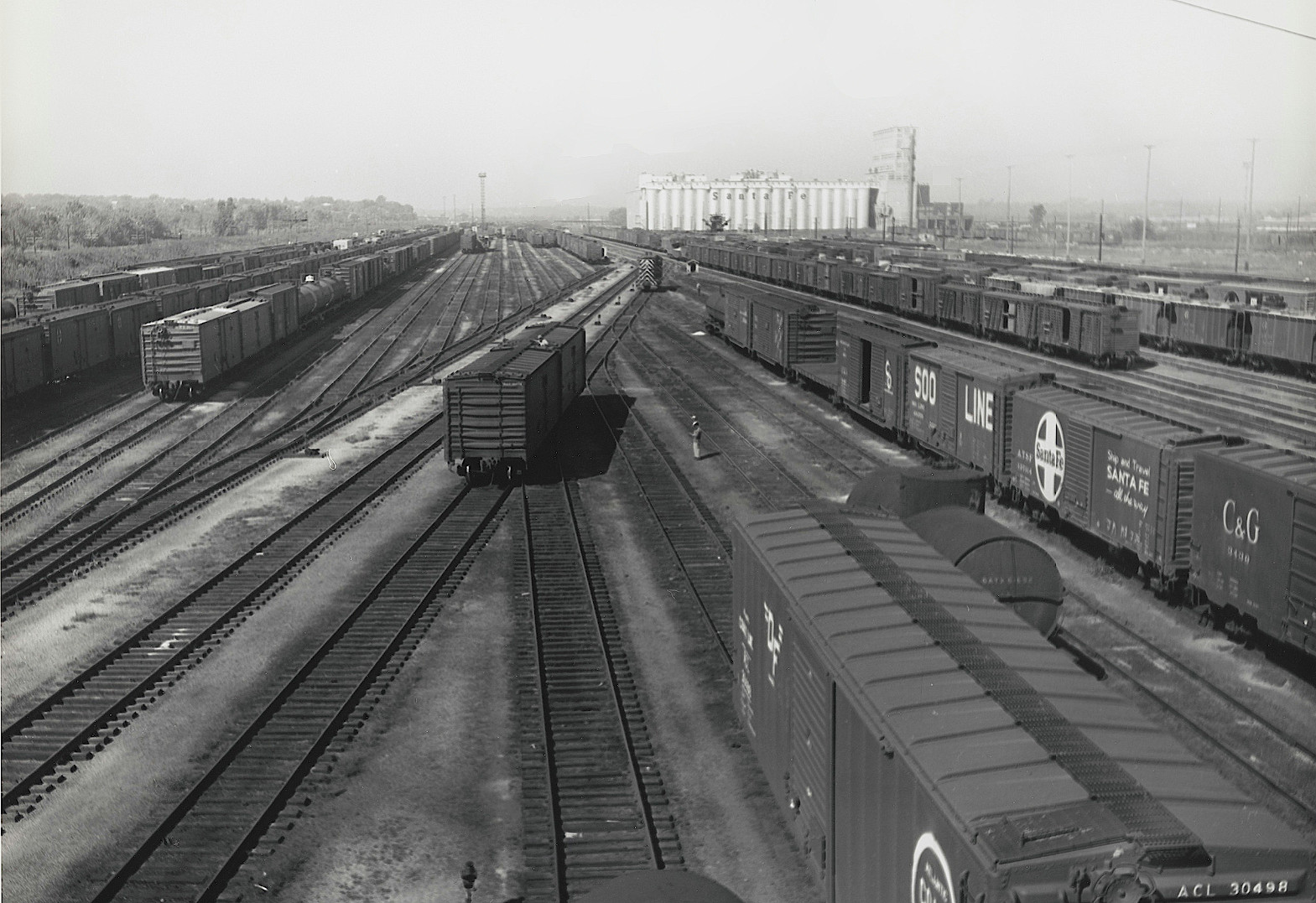
East side of the eastbound marshalling yard 1960 with the silo complex in the center

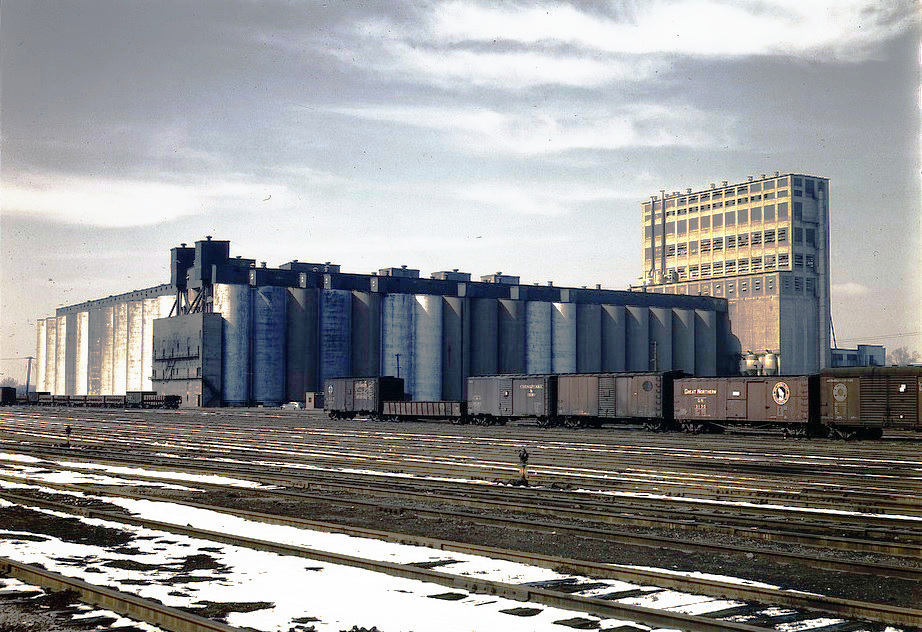
The grain elevator with silo complex 1943, capacity 10 million bushels (approx. 350,000 m^{3})

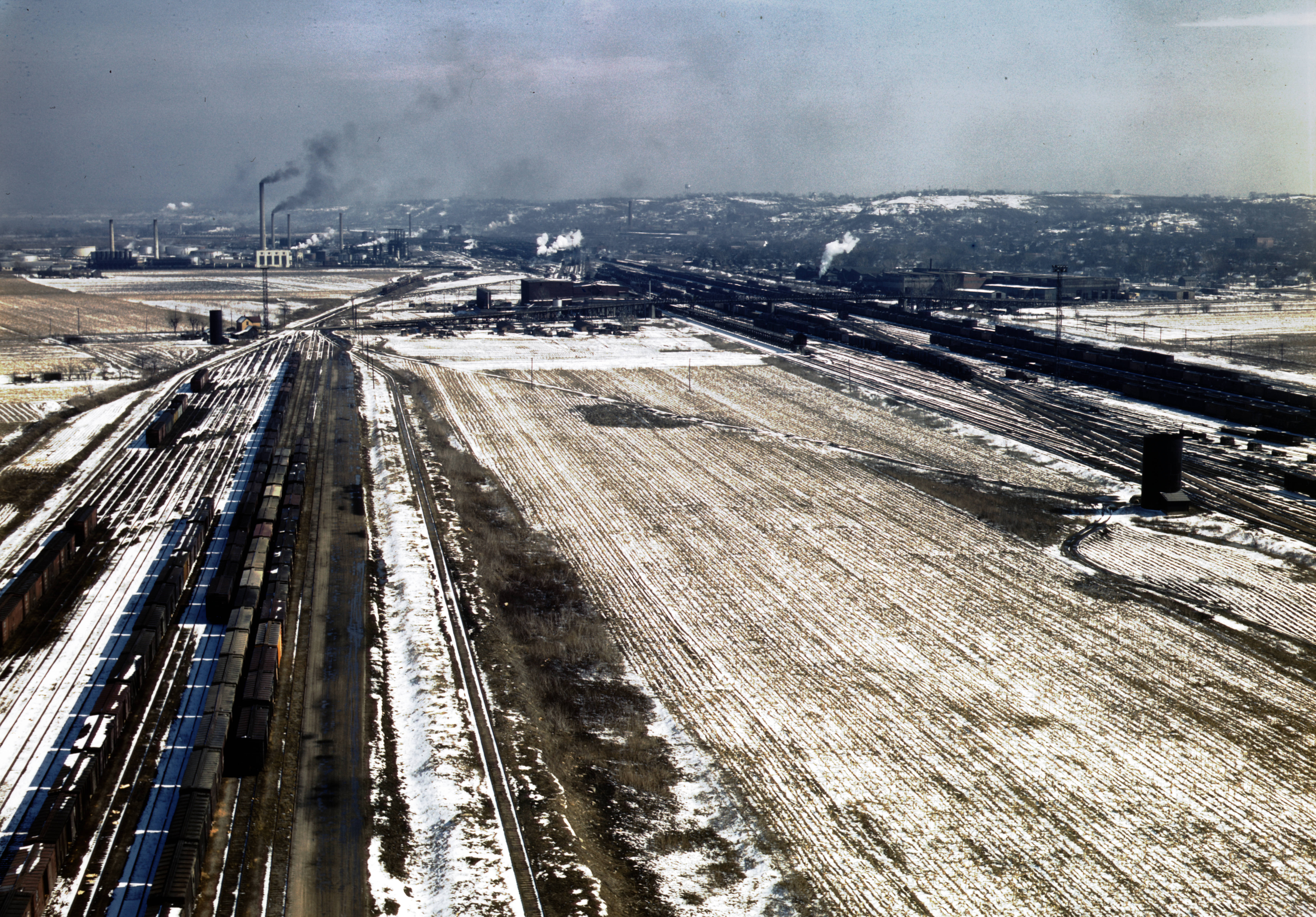
West side of the Argentine Yard 1943(l. eastbound, r. westbound, looking west)

== Facility ==
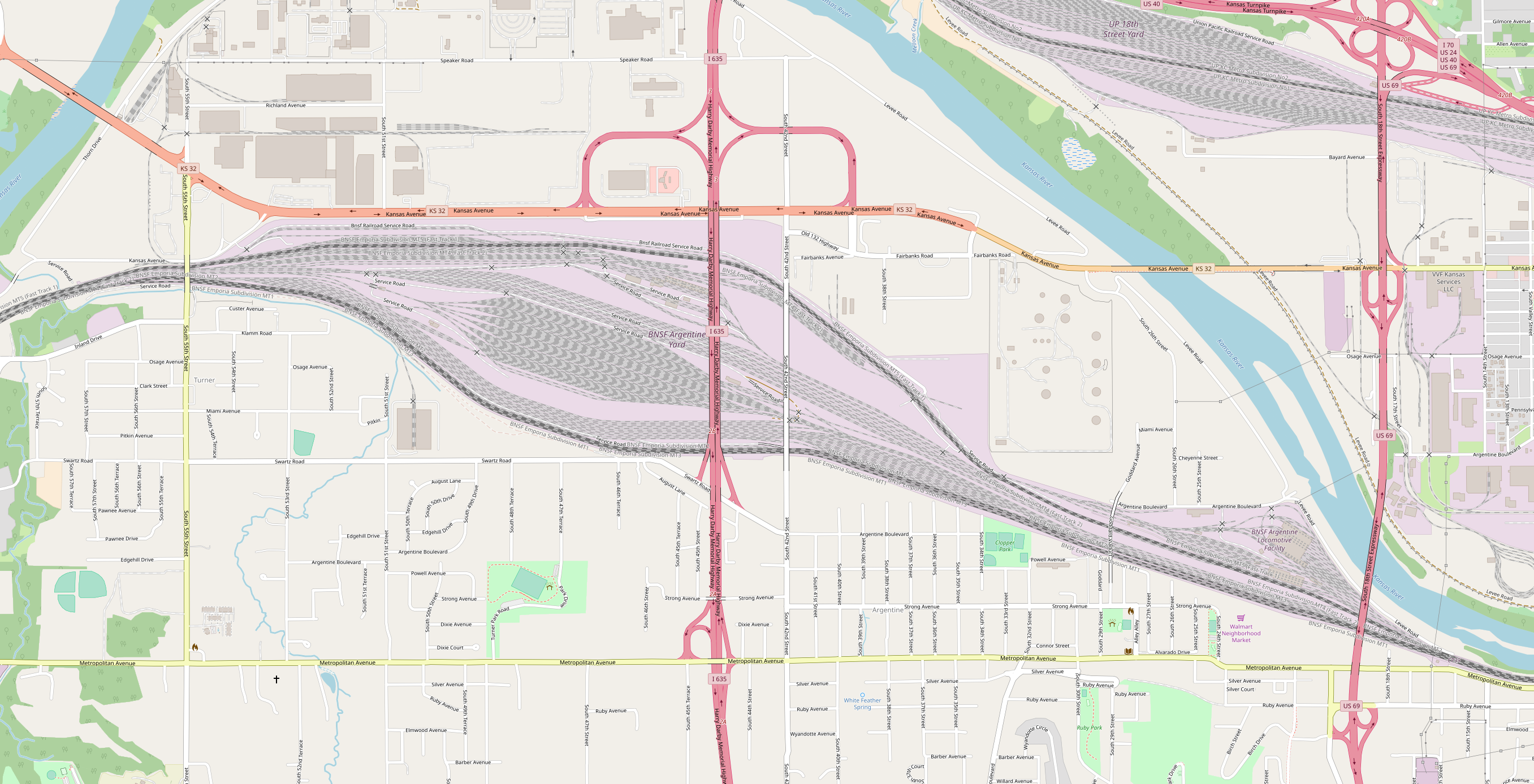
Location and extent of the Argentine Yard in Kansas City, above the Kansas River

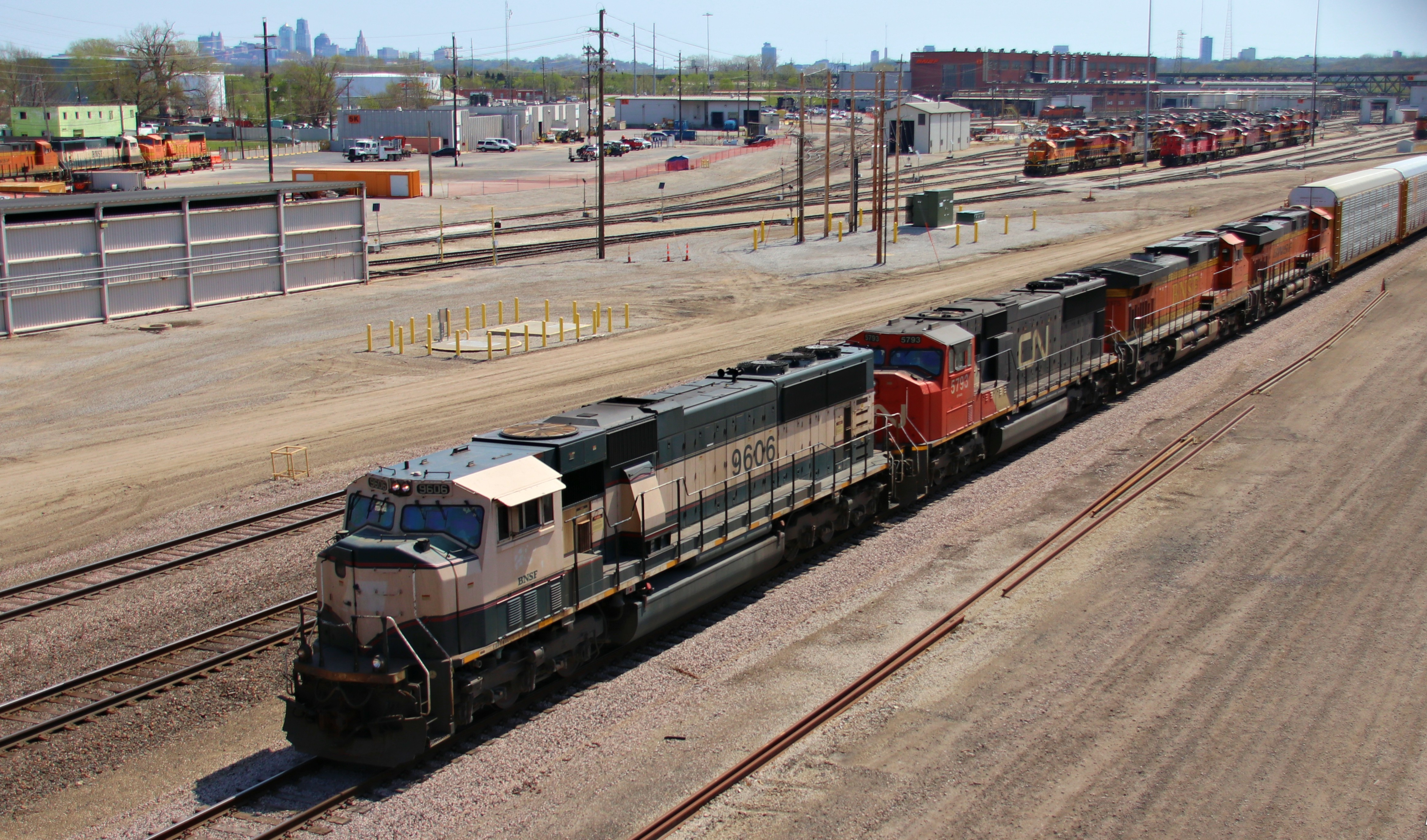
East side of the Argentine Yard (looking east) with the railroad depot and the Kansas City skyline in the background.

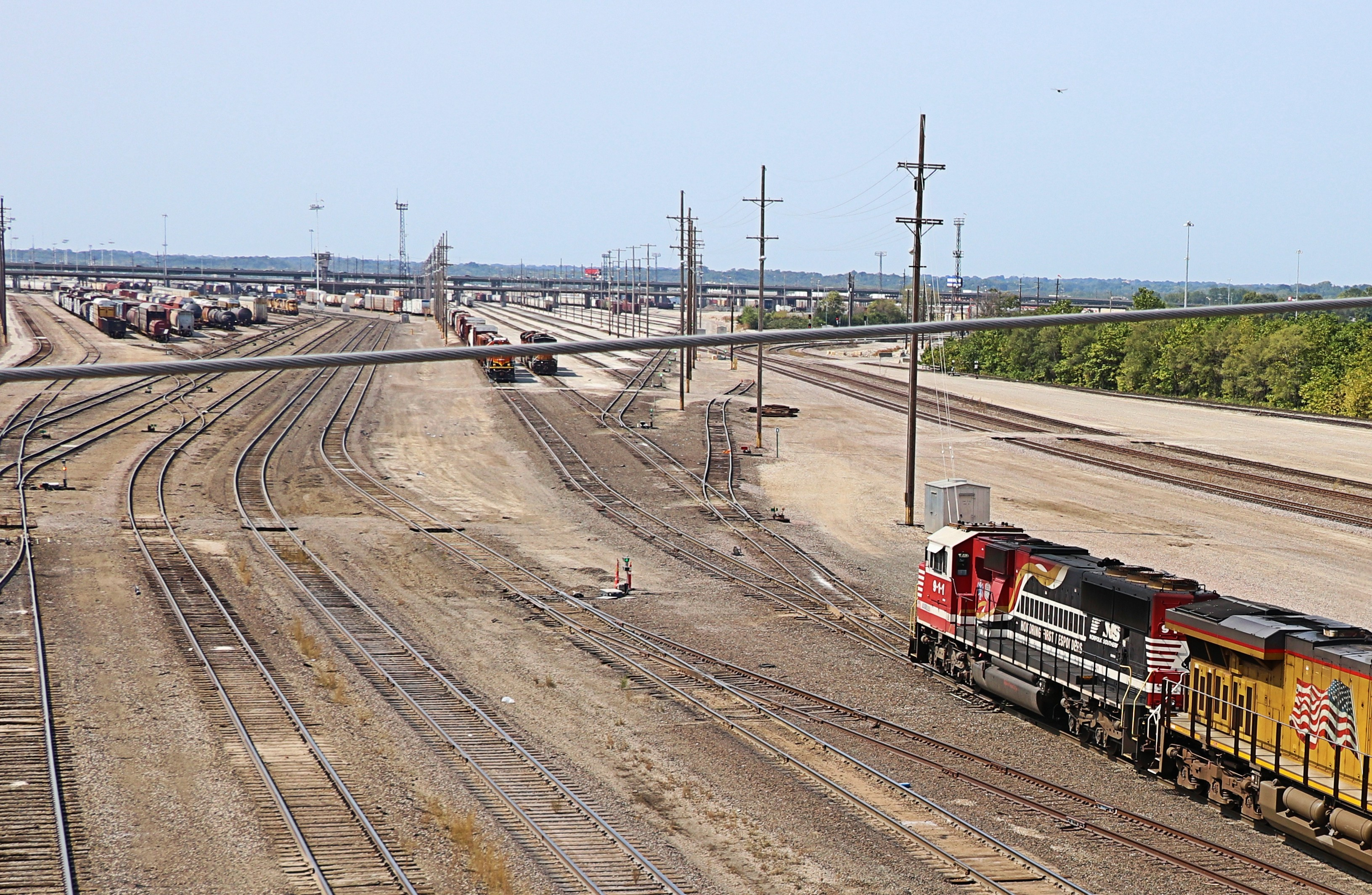
Access from the east heading west, the main section with the directional harp is located behind the Interstate 636 overpass.

The station has ten entry and ten exit tracks as well as 60 directional tracks of up to 1.5 mi in length in the directional harp. Around 4 cars per minute can be shunted, with a theoretical maximum throughput of 5,760 cars per day. During modernization, the BNSF also had Dowty retarders installed for the first time as gradient compensation brakes. Since the mid-1950s, there has also been a depot on the east side for the maintenance of switching locomotives. The BNSF operates another classification yard, the Murray Yard in North Kansas City (formerly Burlington Northern), which is connected to the Argentine Yard via the Hannibal Bridge (1917) and ASB Bridge (1911) as well as by tracks along the Kansas River. The east–west connection of the BNSF runs in the Kansas City area over tracks of the Kansas City Terminal Railway (KCTR), including, since 2004, the Argentine Connection Bridge located 3.1 mi east of the yard.

== See also ==
- List of rail yards
- BNSF Railway classification yards: Barstow Yard, Corwith Yard, Galesburg Yard, Northtown Yard
