= Illinois Northern Railroad =

American industrial switching railway

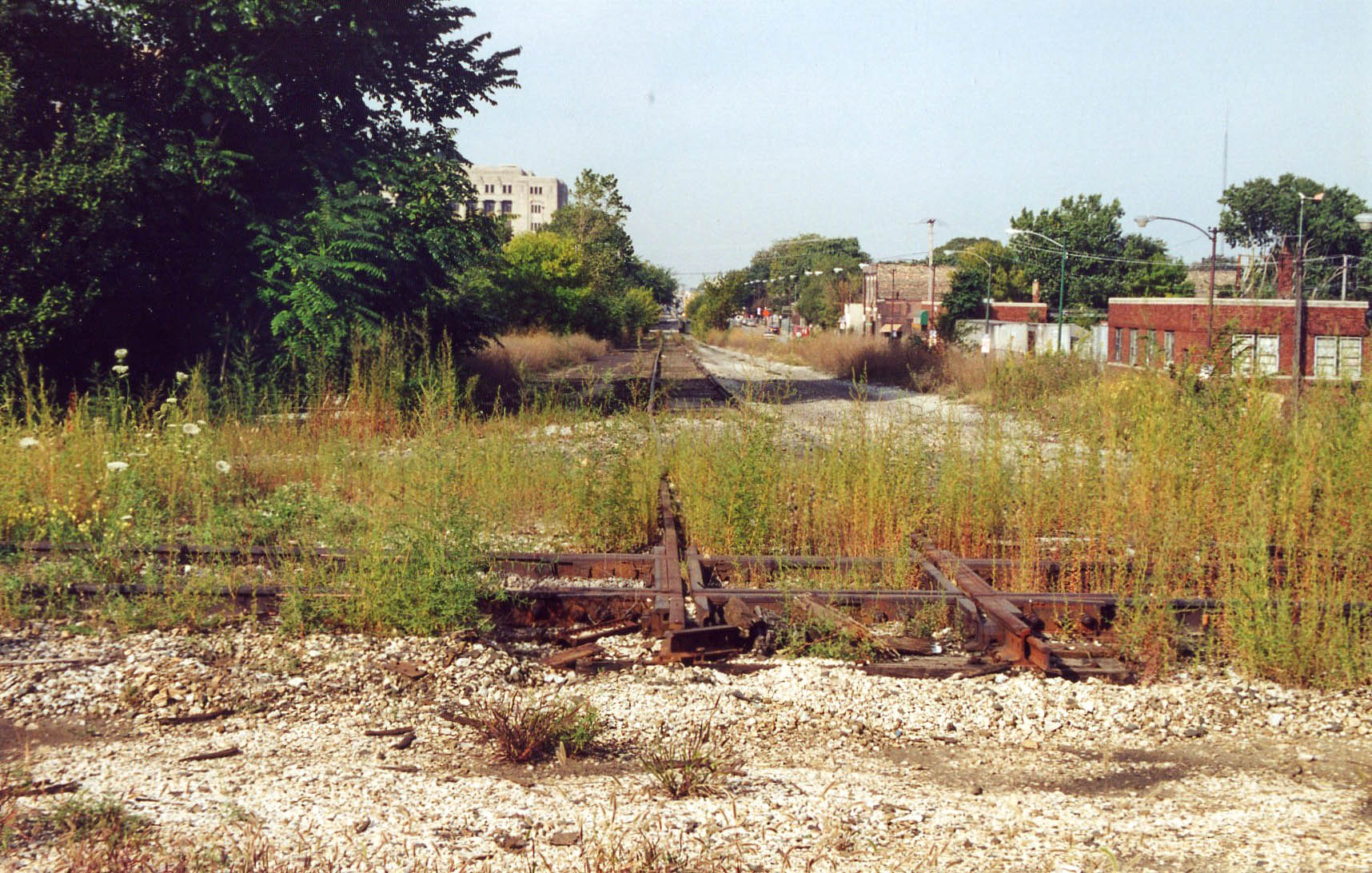
- Abandoned Illinois Northern track at former Panhandle Crossing

Overview
- Headquarters: Chicago, Illinois, USA
- Reporting mark: IN
- Dates of operation: 1901–1975
- Successor: Santa Fe Railroad

Technical
- Track gauge: 4 ft 8 1/2 in (1,435 mm) standard gauge
- Track length: 16.07 miles (25.86 km) (1930)

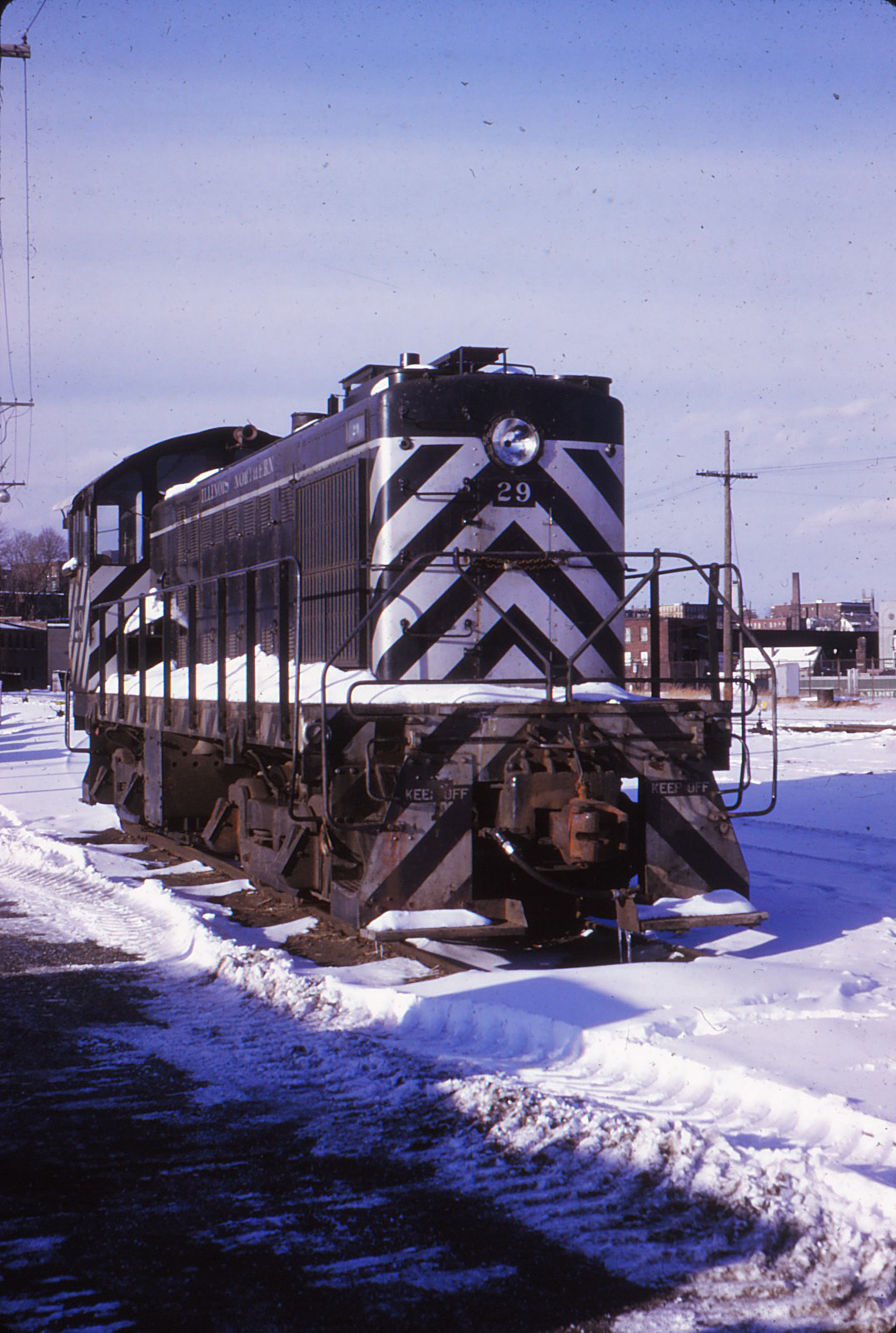
Illinois Northern Railroad Alco S2 engine is parked alongside Hoyne Avenue South of Blue Island Avenue in 1974.

The Illinois Northern Railroad (reporting mark IN) was an industrial switching railroad serving Chicago's southwest side. From their yard at 26th St. and Western Ave. the line went southwest to the Santa Fe (now BNSF) Railway's Corwith Yard, connecting with most major area railroads and serving on-line customers on the way. They also leased and switched track east of their yard. Incorporated in 1901, it was merged into the Santa Fe Railway in 1975.

== History ==
The Illinois Northern Railroad was incorporated in 1901 by the McCormick Reaper Company (merged into the new International Harvester Co. in 1902). It was used primarily to switch their McCormick Plant and later Tractor Factory. This let them control any traffic that served the factories.

After 1945 International Harvester started moving production from the two old factories to other locations and sold the Illinois Northern to four railroads. The Santa Fe bought a controlling 51%, 25% was bought by the Burlington, and the New York Central Railroad and the Pennsylvania Railroad each bought 12%.

On February 16, 1975 the Illinois Northern was merged into the Santa Fe.

In 2000 the Central Illinois Railroad was incorporated to operate the Illinois Northern route and some BNSF track east, in 2010 they went out of business and the BNSF resumed operating the line until it was closed.

== Trackage ==
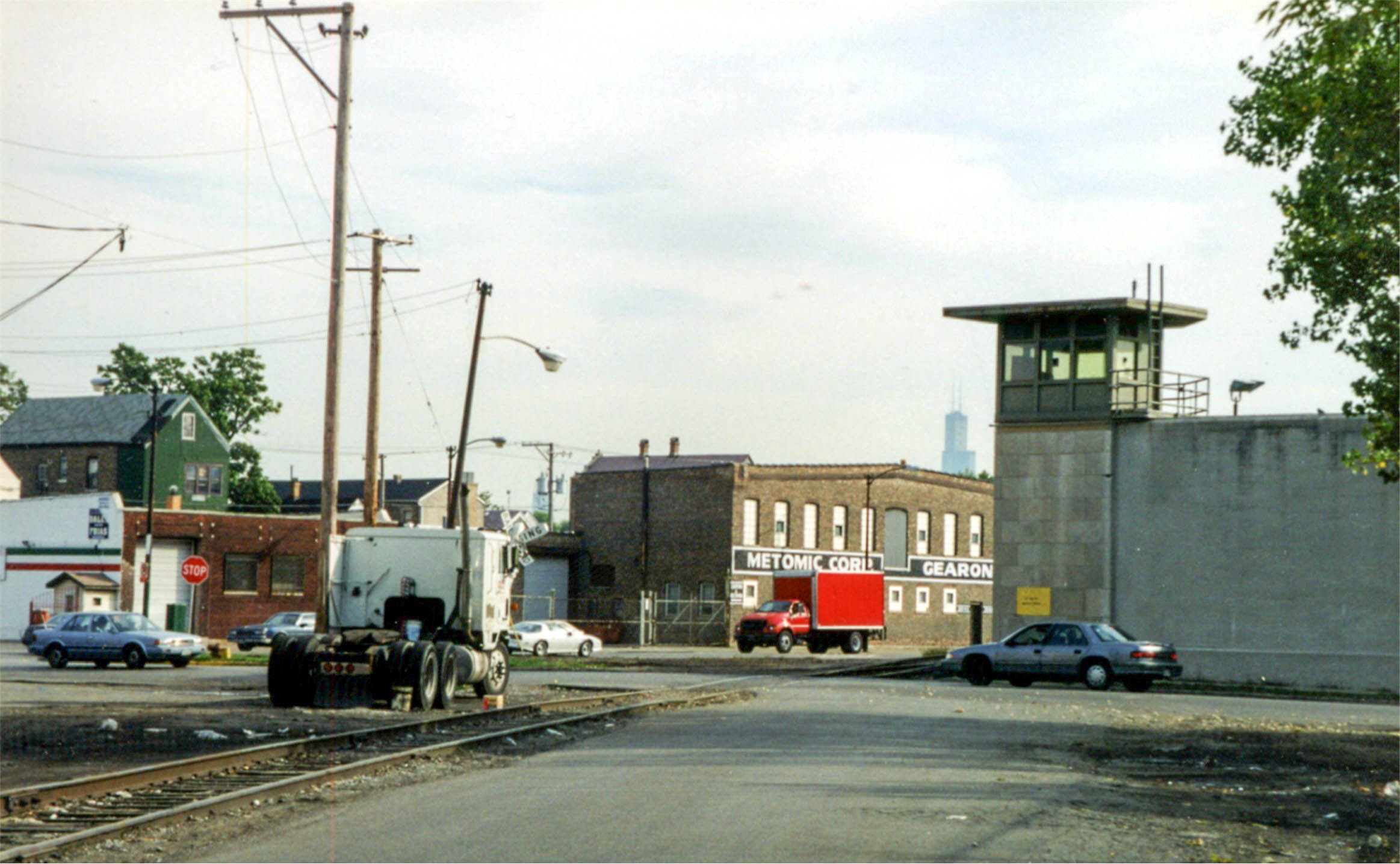
Illinois Northern track at 26th Street and Sacramento Avenue in Chicago

The main line ran west along the south side of 26th St., sometimes elevated, from Western Ave. to Sacramento Ave., where it turned southwest. At Central Park Ave. and 32nd St. the line turned south, crossed the Chicago Sanitary Canal on a swing bridge, and then into the Santa Fe's Corwith Yard. This section was leased from the Santa Fe Railroad.

A yard with a freight house and engine servicing facilities was at the southwest corner of Western Ave. and 26th St. Immediately west, across a major north-south rail corridor, was the 26th St. switch yard. Connections to the north-south corridor were made here. Later the International Harvester Tractor Factory was built south of this yard.

There were a number of on-line businesses on the diagonal section between Sacramento Ave. and Central Park Ave. Then the north and south section made connections with several main rail lines from the north end of their 33rd St. switch yard. Then the line crossed the Chicago Sanitary Canal on a twin-track through-truss swinging bridge. South of the bridge the line made connections with two railroads and then entered the Corwith Yard.

The McCormick Works, the primary reason the railroad was incorporated, was just east of the service yard on the southeast corner of Western Ave. and Blue Island Ave. (a diagonal street which ends at 26th St. and Western Ave.). The McCormick complex had both mainline and switching tracks. The Illinois Northern leased a short distance of main and yard track northeast along Blue Island Ave. between Western Ave. and Hoyne Ave. from the Burlington Railroad (now BNSF Railway).

When the Harvester Works was closed in the 1950s, much of the area was redeveloped into a new industrial park. Much of the plant trackage east of Western Avenue was reconfigured at this time. Several new warehouses were built. Two of these warehouses are still served by rail today. This relatively new trackage would be served by the Illinois Northern and later Santa Fe from Corwith Yard. Sometime after Santa Fe and Burlington Northern merged to form BNSF, the diamond with the Panhandle at 26th and Western was removed. BNSF could now service the easternmost former Illinois Northern trackage from the former BN/CB&Q Western Avenue Yard along with the adjacent Lumber District trackage. This arrangement would remain with BNSF and the Central Illinois Railway Company operating the Illinois Northern and Lumber District trackage as separate leads with no physical connection.

East of Hoyne Ave. the Illinois Northern had trackage rights on the Burlington line along Blue Island Ave. to Lincoln (now Wolcott) Ave.

As of 2020 no track between Western Ave. and the Sanitary Canal remained. The trackage east of Western Avenue remains to service Domino Sugar near 31st and Western and the Sims Metal Management scrapyard at 2500 S. Paulina Street.

== Equipment ==
As a switching line the Illinois Northern never owned a road locomotive. In 1910 they owned six steam switching locomotives of the 0-6-0 type. In 1950 and 1951 they bought six Alco S4 B-B diesel locomotives, #29-#34. After being merged into the Santa Fe in 1975 Santa Fe (then BNSF) locomotives were used.

In 1910 The Illinois Northern owned forty-eight revenue cars, thirty box cars and eighteen gondolas. In 1930 they owned sixty-two revenue cars. In 1971 they only owned three cabooses and two service cars.
