= Barstow Yard =

Railway yard in Barstow, California

Coordinates: 34°53′35.5″N 117°04′28.6″W

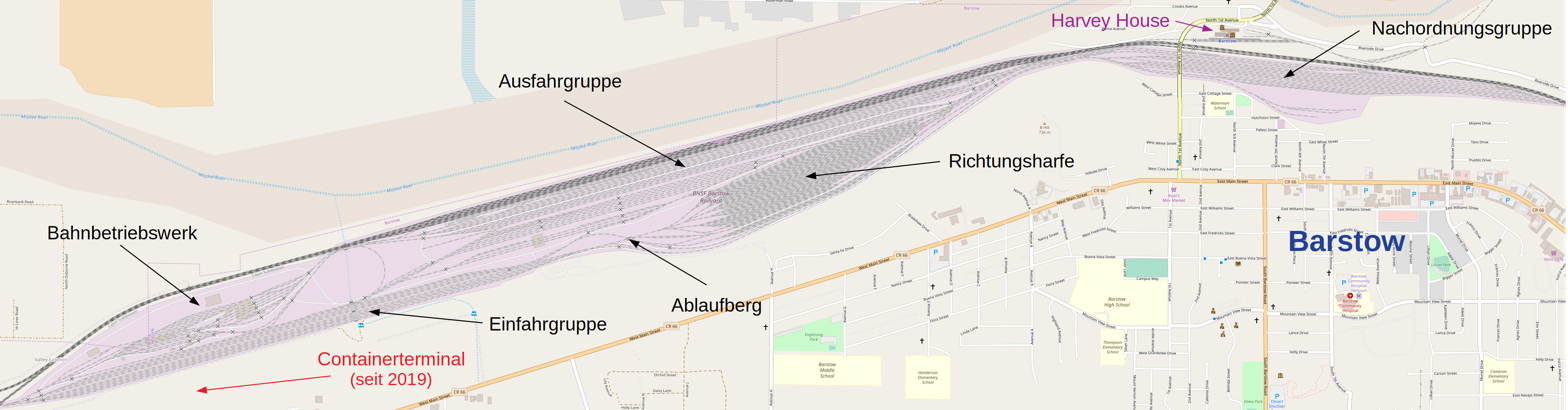
A map of Barstow Yard

Barstow Yard is a classification yard operated by Burlington Northern Santa Fe Railway (BNSF) in Barstow, California, United States. With 48 directional tracks and a total area of approximately 600 acres (240 ha), it is the second largest classification yard west of the Rocky Mountains after the J.R. Davis Yard. Almost all freight traffic to and from Southern California runs through the junction.

Its beginnings date back to the construction of a southern transcontinental railroad connection by the Atchison, Topeka and Santa Fe Railway (AT&SF). At the end of the 19th century, the Mojave Desert had to be crossed, in which an important branch for traffic from the Midwest to San Francisco in the north and to Los Angeles and San Diego in the southwest was created here. In the early 1970s, AT&SF expanded the railroad facilities into a large flat facility that stretches above the city for nearly 5 miles (8.0 km) along the Mojave River. In 1995, the AT&SF merged with the Burlington Northern Railroad (BN) to form the BNSF Railway. BNSF operates the transcontinental connection under the name Southern Transcon and, in 2019, employed around 1000 people at Barstow Yard.

== History ==
By 1867, the Southern Pacific Railroad (SP) had completed the western portion of the first transcontinental railroad link between San Francisco and Omaha, Nebraska, and expanded into southern California in the 1870s. Soon after, a spur was built from Los Angeles to Yuma on the Colorado River in Arizona. A line from Mojave, California through the desert to Needles, California, about 124 miles (200 km) north of Yuma on the Colorado River, was also built, connecting the planned Atlantic and Pacific Railroads between Missouri and California. The western section ran east to Isleta, New Mexico. After 1880, the California Southern Railroad created a line from San Diego in the south via San Bernardino to the SP line in today's Barstow, about 60 miles (97 km) east of Mojave. The intersection was called Waterman Junction after the governor of California Robert Waterman, who ran a ranch and operated several silver mines in the area.

During the second phase of the Great Depression from 1873 to 1896, the western part of the never-completed Atlantic and Pacific, between Needles and Isleta, was reorganized as a subsidiary of the AT&SF, which operated its network, thereby widened, westward through Isleta to Needles; the eastern portion became part of the St. Louis-San Francisco Railway. AT&SF also acquired the section through the Mojave Desert from SP and reached the west coast through its subsidiary, California Southern Railroad. Waterman Junction was named in 1886 by the president of the AT&SF William Barstow Strong in Barstow.

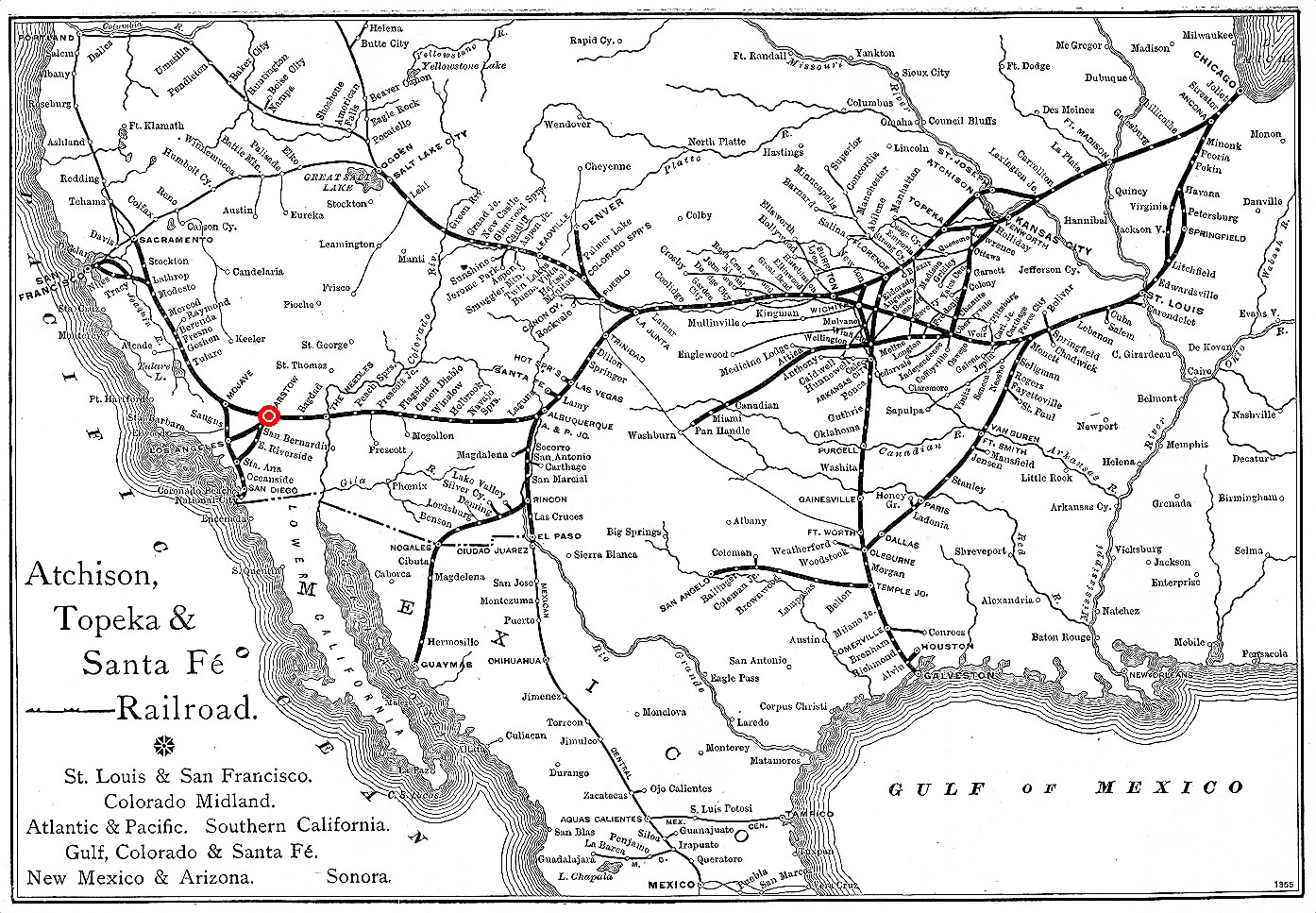
Network of AT&SF of 1891, incl. Distance right was a connection from San Francisco to Chicago (left Barstow)

The AT&SF was able to expand its original network from Kansas (Atchison and Topeka Railroad) to New Mexico (Albuquerque and Santa Fe) to the Pacific coast by the end of the 19th century. In 1888, the rail network extended east to Chicago, Illinois. Another transcontinental railroad connection was built in the south after the Sunset Route of the SP, which was completed in 1883 and ran further south from Yuma via El Paso to New Orleans. Due to its location at the junction of routes to San Francisco in the north and to Los Angeles and San Diego southwest, Barstow was, after Sacramento, one of the most important railway hubs in California at the beginning of the 20th century. After the train station was destroyed by a fire at the end of 1909, AT&SF built a large railway depot with a roundhouse for 25 steam locomotives. Tracks were built to expand along the Mojave River into a large marshalling and freight yard.

By 1906, SP had built what would become the largest marshalling yard in northern California.

=== Air pollution remediation ===
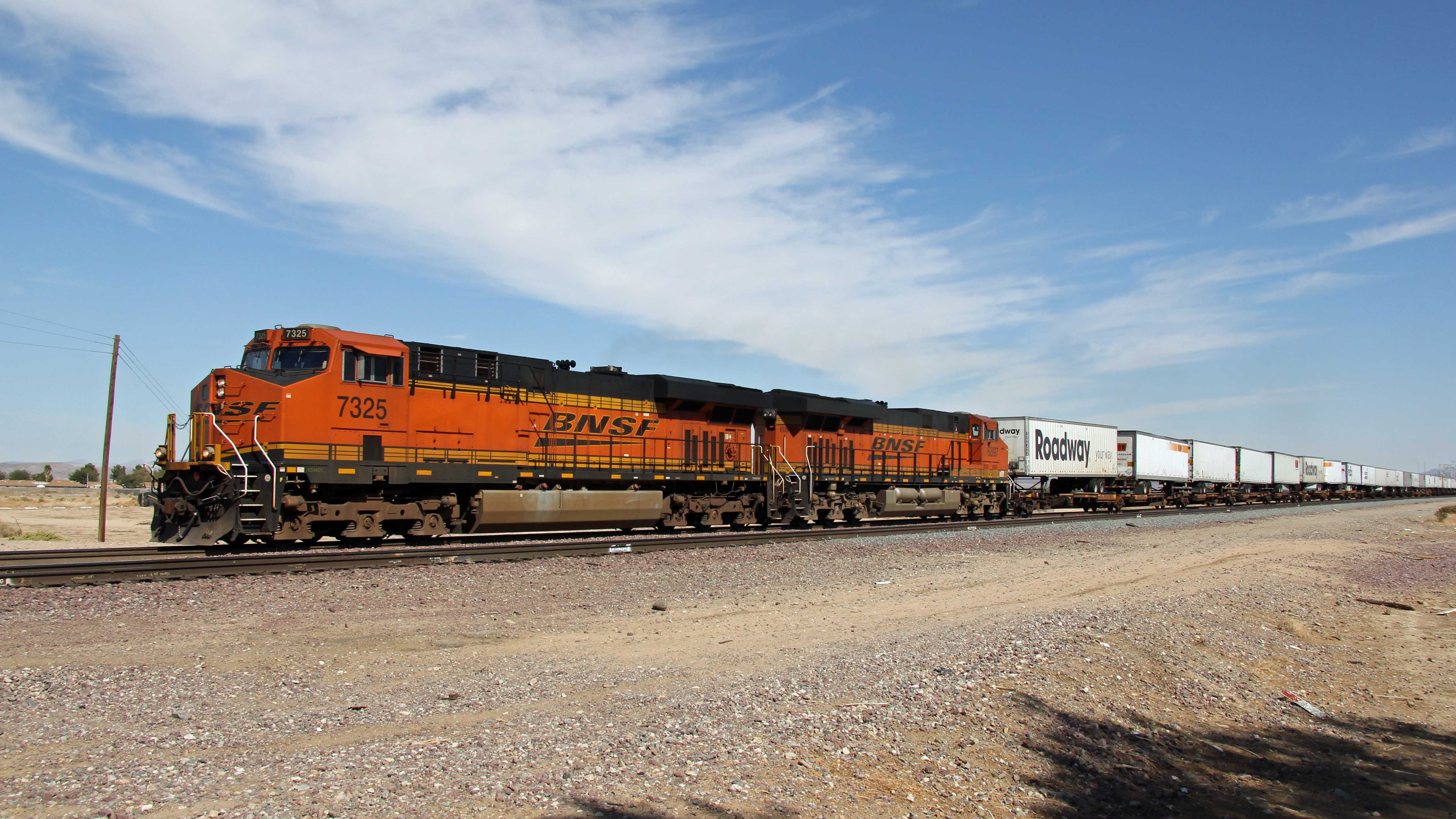
TOFC train (trailer on flatcar) with two diesel locomotives according to Tier 1/2, 40 km southwest of Barstow in 2012.

In 2005, the California Air Resources Board (CARB) signed an agreement with the two largest railroad companies operating in California, BNSF and UP, to reduce particulate matter pollution at marshalling yards in the state by about 20% (Statewide Railyard Agreement). Part of the agreement was the implementation of health risk assessments for the 17 largest marshalling yards. In 2006, according to the CARB study, over 150,000 diesel locomotives passed Barstow Yard, of which only about 54,000 stopped on the site or were used to operate the marshalling yard. As a result, Barstow Yard had the highest particulate matter pollution of all Californian marshalling yards in 2006 with 28 tons, which was even higher than that of the larger JR Davis Yard of the UP (25 tons) due to the immense through traffic. With the tightening of the state's air pollution control requirements in California, BNSF was forced to renew its fleet of diesel locomotives, and in 2012, 84 percent of the more than 6,000 locomotives met the environmental protection agency's Tier 0 emissions standards. With funding from CARB and in collaboration with GE Transportation Systems, the BNSF since 2020 has been investigating, inter alia, a route between Barstow and Stockton using battery-electric locomotives in combination with conventional diesel locomotives.

=== Yard Expansion ===
In 2018, BNSF invested $27 million in the construction of a container terminal on the south side of the classification yard. Across from the depot, two new 1 mile (1.6 km) loading tracks with an attached storage area for over 600 semi-trailers were put into operation in 2019.

== Layout and Operation ==
The Barstow Yard extends above the town of Barstow for almost 5 miles (8.0 km) along the Mojave River and occupies an area of about 600 acres (240 ha). Following the flow of traffic, the track systems of the flat station are divided from west to east into the following track groups: the arriving freight trains are directed into the entry group (approx. 10 tracks) in the west; the mainline locomotives (line haul) are replaced here by shunting locomotives (switchers), which move the trains to the drainage mountain and push the freight cars into the eastward classification bowl (48 tracks) in the center; here, the freight cars are put together into new trains, which are then transported to the departure yard (approx. 10 tracks) in the east; these tracks are used to change direction to the exit group (approx. 15 tracks) above the direction harp (pull-out tracks); before leaving, mainline locomotives take over the final trains again, where in the classification yard several locomotives are usually combined into consists.

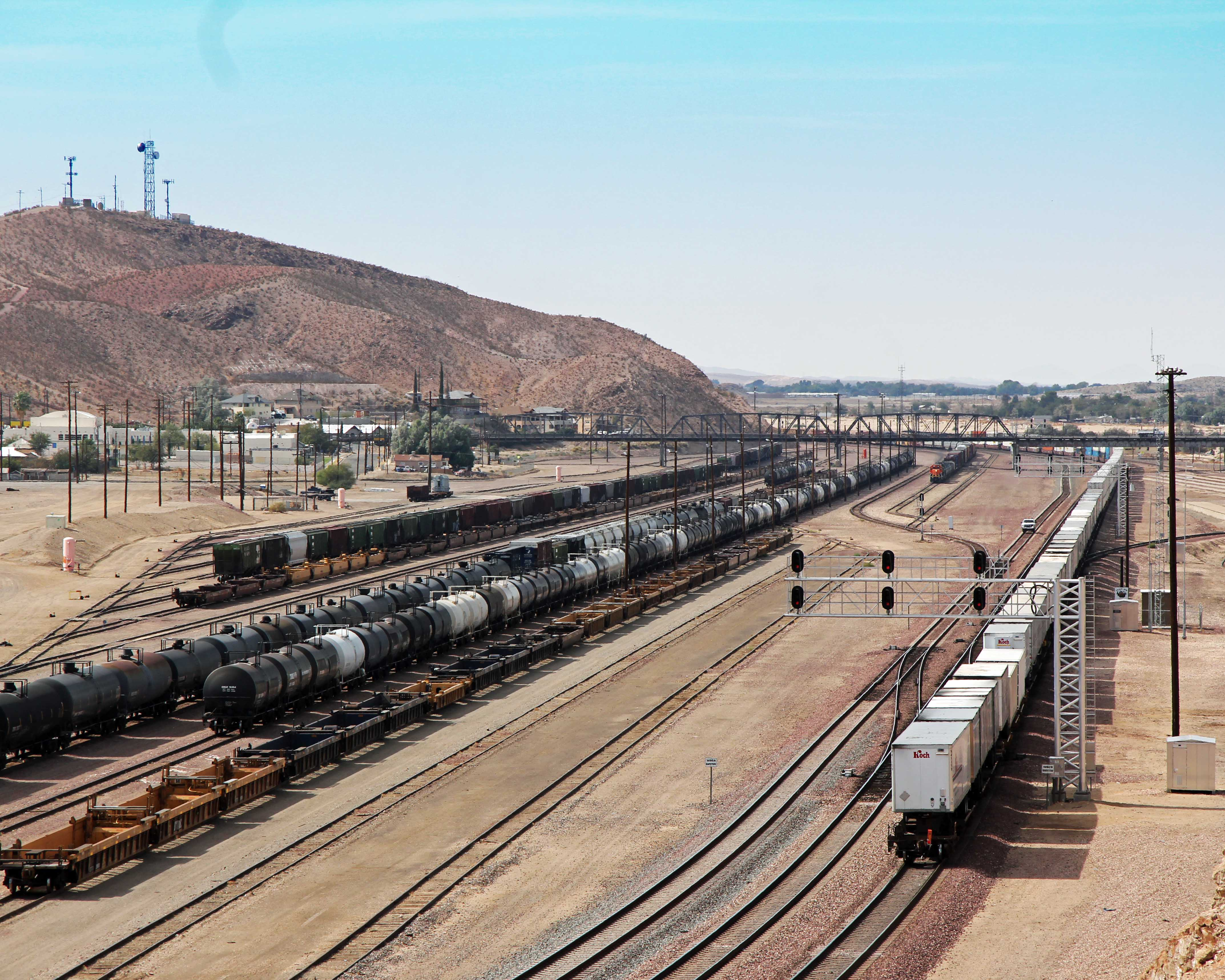
The eastern portion of the yard in 2012

At the end of the west side, the depot has a maintenance facility for diesel locomotives with six continuous tracks and further systems for refueling and cleaning, as well as a turning loop. There is also a maintenance facility for freight cars (three continuous tracks) and several sidings for locomotives between the discharge hill and the exit group. In the north, several busy bypass tracks border the area (BNSF Cajon and Mojave Subdivisions), which are also used by Amtrak and Union Pacific (UP).

With over five million freight containers per year, BNSF has the largest market share in intermodal freight traffic among the Class I railroad companies and wants to relieve other terminals in Southern California along the Southern Transcon Corridor with the terminal in Barstow, such as including the Hobart Yard in Los Angeles, which is the BNSF's largest container terminal with over a million containers moved each year.

Barstow Yard is on the California road network at the junction of Interstate 15 (north-south) with Interstate 40 and State Route 58 (east-west).

== Barstow International Gateway ==
In late 2022, BNSF announced the $1.5 billion development of a new yard on the south side of Barstow. This is known as the Barstow International Gateway project. The new yard will be 4,500 acres (1,800 ha).
