= Central Illinois Railroad =

- CIRY
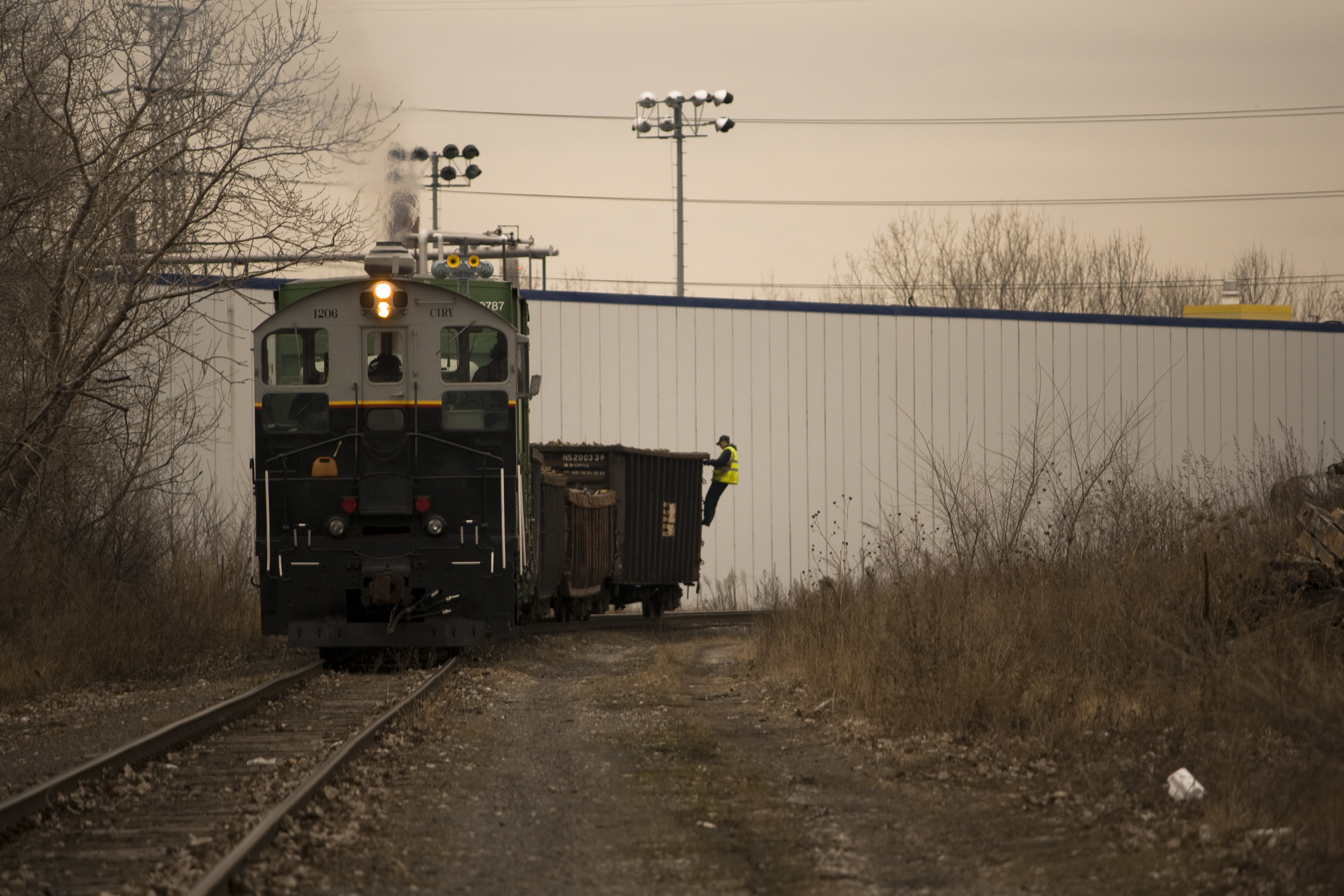
- EMD SW9 #1206 switching in 2010.

Overview
- Main region: Central Illinois
- Dates of operation: 2000–2010

The Central Illinois Railroad (reporting mark CIRY) was a shortline railroad in Illinois. The switching and terminal railroad operated trackage near Peoria, Illinois. The Central Illinois Railroad was established in 2000, operating on track leased from BNSF Railway.

The railroad previously operated around eighteen miles of track owned by BNSF near Chicago, but on 30 July 2010 announced that due to financial losses on those lines, BNSF would resume handling operations on those lines on 9 August.

The CIRY was owned by the Railroad Services Group, which also provided contract switching services and track maintenance.
