= Corwith Yard =

Railroad freight terminal in Chicago, Illinois

Coordinates: 41.81604°N 87.71527°W

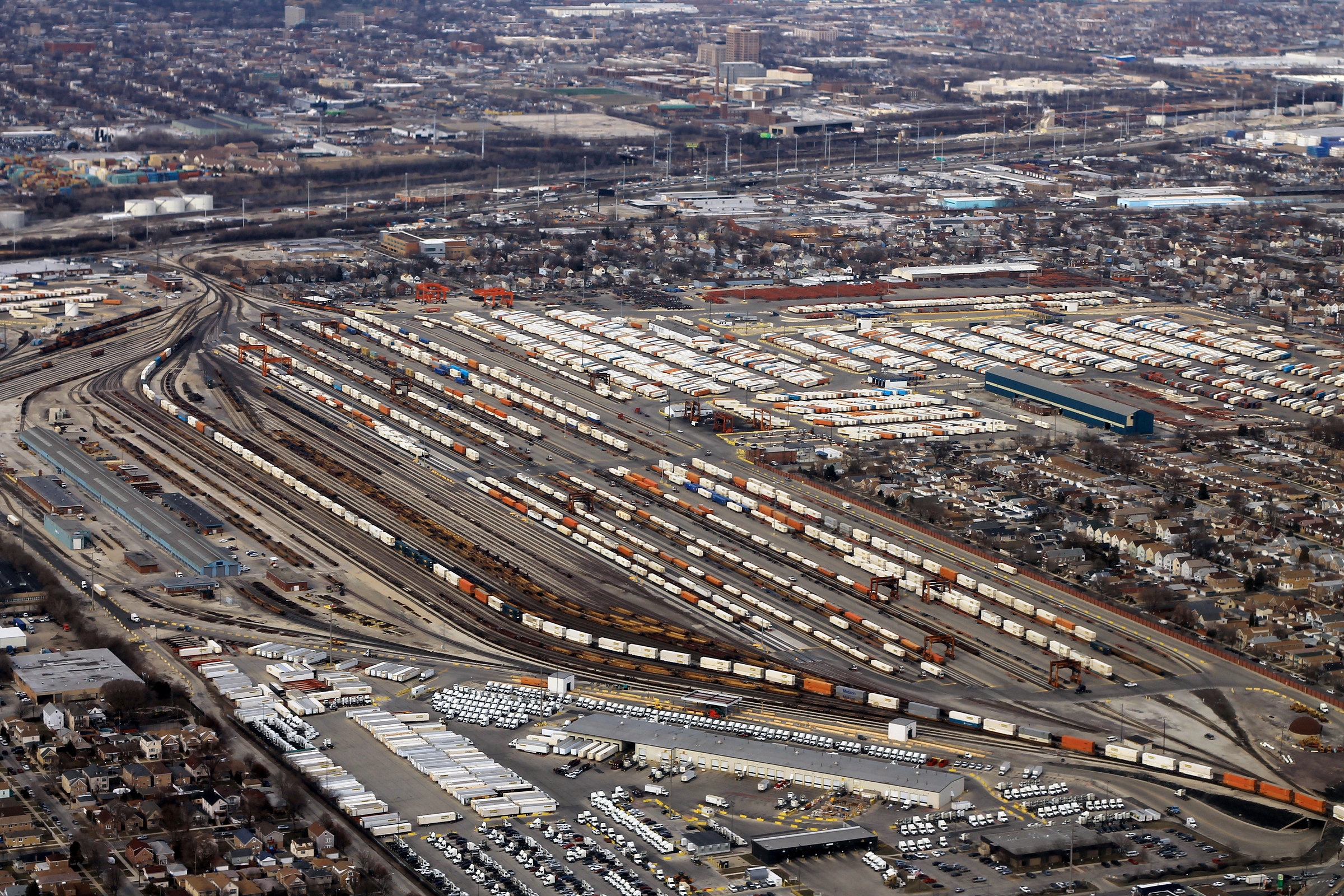
BNSF's Corwith Intermodal Facility in March, 2018.

Corwith Yards is a railroad intermodal freight terminal located at Pershing Road (39th Street) & Kedzie Avenue in the southwest side of Chicago, Illinois, in the neighborhood of Brighton Park. At the time it was built by the Atchison, Topeka and Santa Fe Railway in 1888, it was the world's largest railway yard (nowadays, that title belongs to Bailey Yard, another freight railroad yard owned and operated by BNSF's rival, the Union Pacific Railroad). With adjacent parking and buildings it covers nearly a square mile of land. In the late 19th century Corwith Yards was the end of the line for trains of livestock loaded at AT&SF stations such as Dodge City, Kansas, and bound for the Union Stock Yards, as well as grain and other cargo from the western United States.

Now called the Corwith Intermodal Facility, it now handles much more freight than it did in its 19th-century heyday, for the BNSF Railway, mostly in the form of shipping containers. Corwith container cranes load approximately 1900 containers per day. Human Intelligence systems are used to sort & route the containers.
