= New England Greyhound Lines =

The New England Greyhound Lines (called also NEGL), an intercity highway-coach carrier, was a Greyhound regional operating company, based in Boston, Massachusetts, USA, from 1937 until 1955, when it became a part of the Eastern Division of The Greyhound Corporation (called also the Eastern Greyhound Lines, the first of four huge new divisions (along with Central, Southern, and Western).

== Origin ==
In 1937 The Greyhound Corporation, the original parent Greyhound firm, formed the New England Greyhound Lines (GL) to take over three routes of the New England Transportation (NET) Company, along with two subsidiaries of the NET Company – the Berkshire Motor Coach Lines and the Victoria Coach Lines, two discount-price carriers which NET had previously bought (not later than 1932) – plus the Quaker Stages and the Old Colony Coach Lines, two independent unrelated firms.

The NET Company was the bus subsidiary of the New York, New Haven, and Hartford (NYNH&H) Railroad, commonly known as the New Haven Railroad.

The railway firm bought a one-half interest in the New England GL.

== Eastern GL of New York ==
Already, however, Greyhound had made its first presence in New England in 1930, by forming the Eastern GL (EGL) of New York [as a subsidiary of the undenominated main Eastern GL, which had come into existence in the previous year as a holding company (rather than an operating company), to own a number of Greyhound subsidiaries (both existing ones and future ones) to the east of Chicago (in Illinois) – other than the Pennsylvania GL, in which the Pennsylvania Railroad soon bought a large but minority interest].

The EGL of New York ran in part between Albany (in New York City) and Boston, via Pittsfield, Springfield, and Worcester (all four in Massachusetts).

== Eastern GL of New England ==
In 1930 The Greyhound Corporation, the parent firm, during its rapid growth, formed another subsidiary, the EGL of New England (different and separate from the EGL of New York), then placed it under the undenominated main EGL (the holding company) – along with three other operating subsidiaries (the EGL of Ohio, the EGL of New York, and the EGL of Michigan).

In that same year, 1930, the new EGL of New England (different and separate from the EGL of New York) started running, on two intercity routes acquired from the Gray Line of Boston (a part of the famous sightseeing organization), two routes between Boston and New York City – the inland route, via Worcester and Springfield (both in Massachusetts) and Hartford and New Haven (both in Connecticut), and the shoreline route, via Providence (in Rhode Island) and New London and New Haven (both in Connecticut).

[In 1935 the main (first) Eastern GL plus three subsidiaries, the EGL of Ohio, the EGL of New York, and the EGL of Michigan, became renamed respectively as the (second) Central GL, the CGL of Ohio, the CGL of New York, and the CGL of Michigan, whereas the EGL of New England (due to its eastern or northeastern location) continued to use its same name.]

In 1936 The Greyhound Corporation began to eliminate its multiple (and often complex) intermediate holding companies (between the parent firm and the operating companies) – to avoid a hugely increased federal income tax on the undistributed earnings of corporate subsidiaries – one under the Revenue Act of 1936, which the U.S. Congress had passed as a means by which to cause (or force) a simplification of complex corporate structures in the public-utility industries (including the transportation industries).

In one response (among several others) to the new legislation, in that same year, 1936, Greyhound merged the EGL of New England (as a division rather than a subsidiary) into The Greyhound Corporation, the parent firm.

[Thus The Greyhound Corporation, previously merely a holding company rather than an operating company, became a carrier in its own right and under its own authority with its own ICC-MC number.]

While waiting for the mandatory approval (for the investment, the acquisitions, and the mergers pertaining to the NEGL) of the federal Interstate Commerce Commission (ICC), the EGL of New England (in operation since 1930) and the New England Transportation Company began to coordinate their scheduled trips (between Boston and New York City) with each other, and each company began to accept the tickets of the other.

In 1939 the ICC announced its decision to allow the proposed actions, and the two companies (the NEGL and the NET Company) moved forward by carrying out their plans.

== Development ==
The New England GL acquired three routes from the NET Company: the shoreline route between Boston and New York City via Providence, New London, and New Haven, the one between New Haven and Willimantic via Middletown and Marlborough (all four in Connecticut), and the one between New York City and Pittsfield (in Massachusetts) via Danbury, New Milford, and Torrington (all three in Connecticut).

The NEGL acquired also (likewise from the NET Company) the Berkshire and Victoria firms (each of which ran between Boston and New York City on an inland route via Hartford).

The NEGL further acquired the Quaker firm [which ran between Boston and Bangor (in Maine) via Portsmouth (in New Hampshire) and Portland and Augusta (the last two in Maine) and between Portland and Belfast (both in Maine)] and the Old Colony firm [which ran not only between Boston and New York City but also between Boston and Saint Stephen, New Brunswick, Canada, just across the border from Calais, Maine, via Portsmouth (in New Hampshire) and Portland, Augusta and Bangor (all three in Maine)].

[After those acquisitions by the NEGL, Berkshire, Victoria, Quaker, and Old Colony all ceased to exist, although the NET Company continued to operate on several other routes (albeit on shorter ones) in Connecticut, Rhode Island, and Massachusetts, until 1958.]

The Greyhound Corporation, the parent firm, promptly transferred all the new routes north of Boston (to Portsmouth, Portland, Belfast, Augusta, Bangor, and Saint Stephen) from the NEGL to the EGL of New England, which still ran several trips each day between Boston and New York City alongside the NEGL.

In 1940, however, Greyhound transferred to the NEGL the remaining trips of the EGL of New England between Boston and New York City.

The NEGL made several minor acquisitions and dispositions of routes during the following years.

On the last day of October 1950 The Greyhound Corporation bought back the one-half interest of the New Haven Railroad in the New England GL.

On the last day of December 1950 the parent firm merged the EGL of New England into the NEGL.

In 1953 the New England GL bought the International Coach Lines (ICL), based in Rumford, Maine, which ran between two points in Canada – Montréal, Québec, and Saint John, New Brunswick – along a route (a shortcut of sorts) mostly through northern New England – via Stanhope (in Québec), Norton (in Vermont), Colebrook, Lancaster, and Gorham (all three in New Hampshire), Rumford, Bangor, Lincoln, and Calais (all four in Maine), and Saint Stephen (in New Brunswick).

With that purchase the NEGL received five new MCI coaches (of the model 95-D), which the ICL had already ordered, but which had not yet become delivered before the merger of the ICL into the NEGL.

Thus The Greyhound Corporation (through the NEGL as a wholly owned subsidiary) acquired and began to operate its first MCI coaches in the USA.

[The Motor Coach Industries (MCI), then based in Winnipeg, Manitoba, Canada, in one of the “prairie provinces” of Canada, north of North Dakota and Minnesota, was then a Canadian coach builder and was then a subsidiary of one of the Greyhound carriers in Canada.]

[In 1948 the Western Canadian Greyhound Lines, Limited, had bought the MCI as the supplier of its coaches for its operations in Canada (and for sale to others); in -58 The Greyhound Corporation (the parent firm in the US) bought a controlling interest in the MCI (thereby taking an important step toward developing again its own source for its future equipment).]

== Through-coaches on through-routes ==
The New England GL ran a number of through-coaches along its own routes, including those between New York City and Boston, New York City and Portland, New York City and Bangor, New York City and Saint Stephen, and Montréal and Saint John.

However, the NEGL took part in only a few interlined through-routes in cooperation with other operating companies – those between Boston and both Richmond and Norfolk (both in Virginia), both with the Pennsylvania GL and the Richmond GL, and between New York City and both Bennington and Burlington (both in Vermont), with the Vermont Transit Company, in which The Greyhound Corporation then owned a minority interest.

== Meeting other Greyhound companies ==
The New England GL met the EGL of New York in Boston and the Central GL and the Pennsylvania GL in New York City.

== Merger with Pennsylvania GL ==
In 1955, during a time of consolidation, Greyhound merged the New England GL (and the Richmond GL, another regional subsidiary) with the Pennsylvania GL, all of which became redesignated as the Eastern Division of The Greyhound Corporation [called also the (second) Eastern GL], the first of four huge new divisions (along with Southern, Western, and another Central)].

[In the previous year, 1954, Greyhound had already merged the Capitol GL and the (second) Central GL into the Pennsylvania GL.]

Thus ended the New England GL, and thus began the (second) Eastern GL.

== Beyond New England GL ==
Later (about 1966) The Greyhound Corporation reorganized again, into just two humongous divisions, named as the Greyhound Lines East (GLE) and the Greyhound Lines West (GLW); even later (about 1970) it eliminated those two divisions, thereby leaving a single gargantuan undivided nationwide fleet.

In 1987 The Greyhound Corporation (the original parent Greyhound firm), which had become widely diversified far beyond transportation, sold its entire highway-coach operating business (its core bus business) to a new company, named as the (second) Greyhound Lines, Inc., also called the (second) GLI, based in Dallas, Texas – a separate, independent, unrelated firm, which was the property of a group of private investors under the promotion of Fred Currey, a former executive of the Continental Trailways (later renamed as the Trailways, Inc., also called TWI, also based in Dallas), which was by far the largest member company in the Trailways association.

Later in 1987 the (second) Greyhound Lines, Inc., the (second) GLI, the new firm based in Dallas, further bought the Trailways, Inc., the TWI, its largest competitor, and merged it into the GLI.

Later in 1987 the Greyhound Lines, Inc., the GLI, the new firm based in Dallas, further bought the Trailways, Inc., the TWI, its largest competitor, and merged it into the GLI.

The lenders and the other investors of the GLI ousted Fred Currey as the chief executive officer (CEO) after the firm went into bankruptcy in 1990.

The GLI has since continued to experience difficulties and lackluster performance under a succession of new owners and new executives while continuing to reduce its level of service – by hauling fewer passengers aboard fewer coaches on fewer trips along fewer routes with fewer stops in fewer communities in fewer states – and by doing so on fewer days – that is, increasingly operating some trips less often than every day (fewer than seven days per week) – and by using fewer through-coaches, thus requiring passengers to make more transfers (from one coach to another).

After the sale to the GLI, The Greyhound Corporation (the original parent Greyhound firm) changed its name to the Greyhound-Dial Corporation, then the Dial Corporation, then the Viad Corporation. [The contrived name Viad appears to be a curious respelling of the former name Dial – if one scrambles the letters D, I, and A, then turns the V upside down and regards it as the Greek letter lambda – Λ – that is, the Greek equivalent of the Roman or Latin letter L.]

The website of the Viad Corporation (http://www.viad.com) in September 2008 makes no mention of its corporate history or its past relationship to Greyhound – that is, its origin as The Greyhound Corporation.

== Conclusion ==
The routes of the New England GL made a major and significant contribution to the present Greyhound route network.

== See also ==
- The Greyhound Corporation
- Atlantic Greyhound Lines
- Capitol Greyhound Lines
- Central Greyhound Lines
- Dixie Greyhound Lines
- Florida Greyhound Lines
- Great Lakes Greyhound Lines
- Southeastern Greyhound Lines
- Teche Greyhound Lines
- Tennessee Coach Company
