= Tennessee Coach Company =

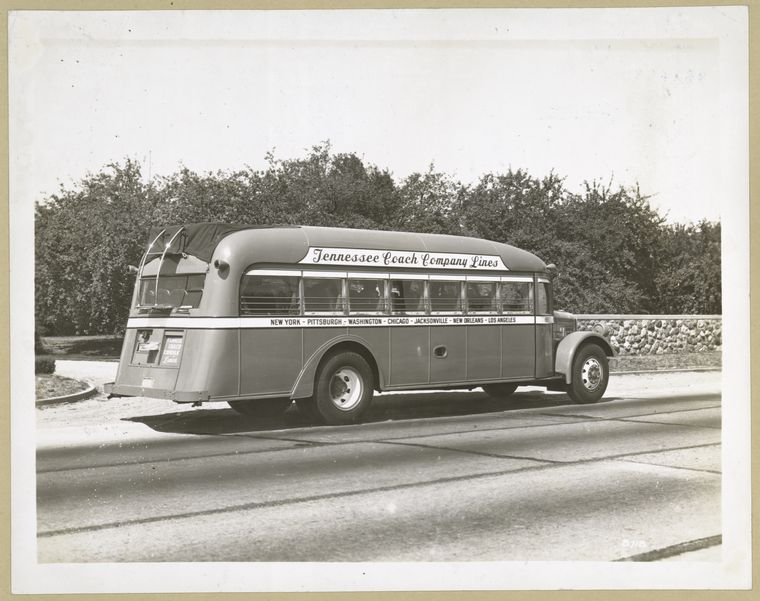
- Tennessee Coach Company bus, ca. 1936
- Founded: 1928
- Defunct: 1976
- Headquarters: Knoxville, Tennessee
- Service area: Southeastern United States
- Service type: Intercity bus service

The Tennessee Coach Company (TCC) was a regional highway-coach carrier, founded in 1928 and based in Knoxville, Tennessee, USA. It was in operation until 1976, when it became merged into the Continental Tennessee Lines, a subsidiary of the Transcontinental Bus System, called also the Continental Trailways. Continental Trailways was by far the largest member company in the Trailways trade association, which was then named the National Trailways Bus System.

== Origin ==
The TCC began in the Volunteer State in 1928, combining the Southern Motor Coach Company, which had started running in 1924 between Knoxville and Chattanooga, and the Safety Coach Company, which had started running in 1925 between Knoxville and Johnson City.

== Background ==
The story of the TCC dates back to 1919 in Ohio with Onnie Bruce "O.B." Baskette. He drove first for the Cleveland-Akron Bus Company, then for the Cleveland-Elyria-Toledo Bus Company (which, despite its name, ran only between Cleveland and Norwalk, Ohio, beyond Elyria but short of Toledo). He then returned to the former firm in a management job.

Baskette moved to North Carolina during the winter of 1924-25 and started working (albeit for a short time) for the Carolina Motor Coaches (running between Raleigh and Greensboro, which in November 1925 became a major part of the newly founded Carolina Coach Company. In May 1940 the latter firm became a member of the Trailways association and became known also as the Carolina Trailways; in 1997 it became a wholly owned subsidiary of Greyhound Lines, Inc. (GLI). One curious result of that last step is that a Greyhound subsidiary, the Carolina Coach Company, the Carolina Trailways, is a member of the Trailways association, now the Trailways Transportation System.

While Baskette was in North Carolina, he met two brothers, Al and M.H. Kraemer, who became connected (although not as principals) with the Carolina Coach Company in its beginning.

Baskette, seeking an opportunity to start a firm of his own, moved to East Tennessee. In March 1925 he began running between Knoxville and Johnson City along US highway 11E (US-11E) via Jefferson City, Morristown, and Greeneville. In the next year, 1926, he incorporated his operation as the Safety Coach Company. He started with two Fageol Safety Coaches and added seven more by the end of 1926. In naming his firm he took a cue from the brand name of the Fageol Safety Coaches, as did a number of the founders of other early coach concerns.

The two Kraemer brothers left the Carolina Coach Company in 1927, then they joined Baskette in his firm in Tennessee.

== Development ==
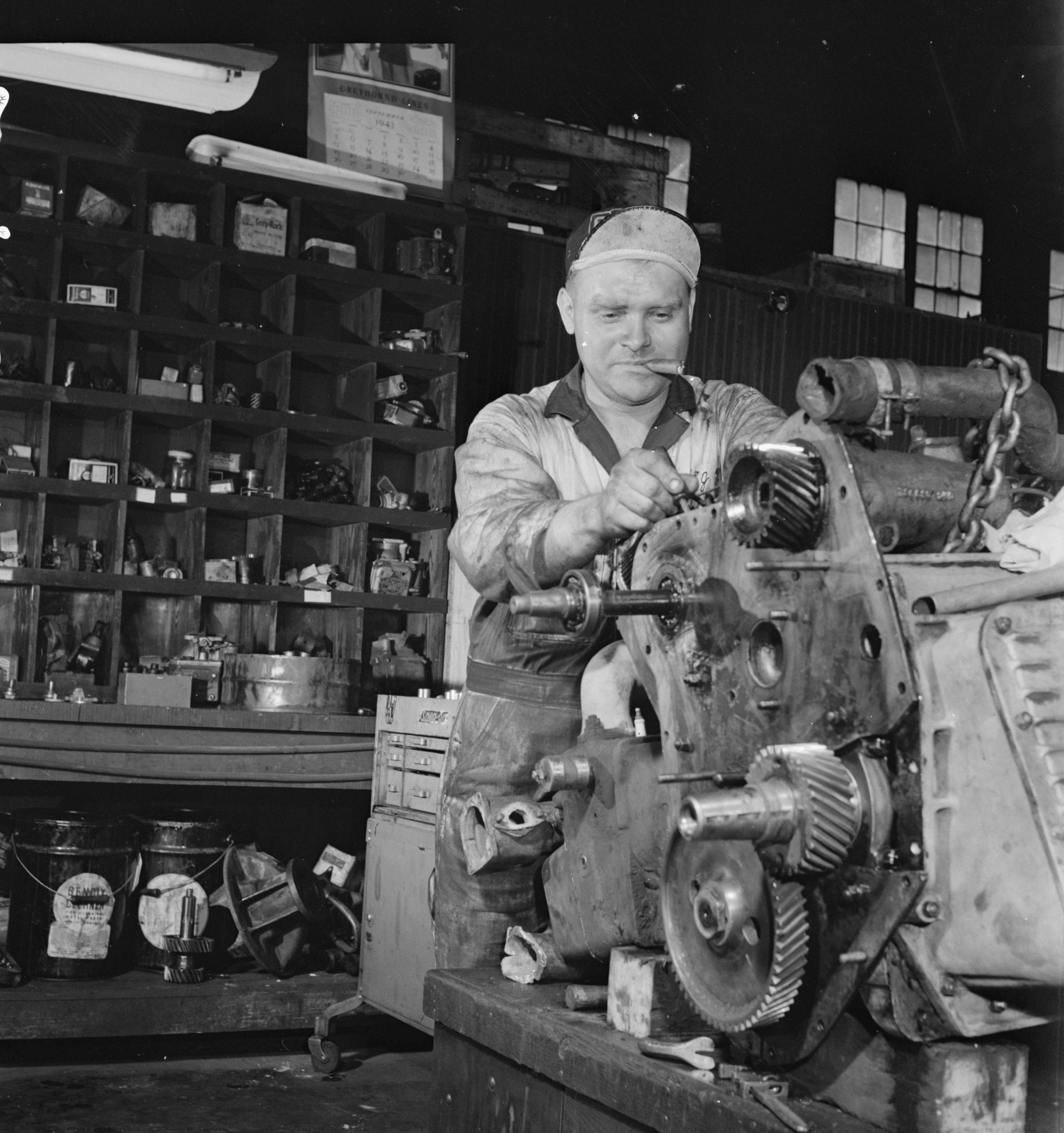
A mechanic rebuilding a bus engine at the TCC garage in Knoxville, 1943 by Esther Bubley

In 1928 O.B. Baskette and Al Kraemer incorporated the Tennessee Coach Company, bought the Southern Motor Coach Company (running between Knoxville and Chattanooga), then merged that firm and Baskett's own Safety Coach Company (running between Knoxville and Johnson City) into the new TCC.

The State of Tennessee in 1929 issued a joint certificate (of public convenience and necessity) to the TCC and the Union Transfer Company (UTC), based in Nashville, for service between Nashville and Knoxville along US-70, later redesignated in part as US-70S, via Murfreesboro, Woodbury, McMinnville, Sparta, Crossville, Rockwood, and Kingston.

In 1930 the Consolidated Coach Corporation (Consolidated, CCC, or the CCC Lines), based in Lexington, Kentucky, bought the UTC; in 1931 Consolidated adopted the brand name, trade name, or service name of the Southeastern Greyhound Lines (Southeastern, SEG, SEGL, or the SEG Lines); in 1936 the Consolidated firm became renamed as the Southeastern Greyhound Lines (GL).

The Tennessee Coach Company in 1929 extended its Johnson City line to Bristol (on the state line between Tennessee and Virginia) and in 1930 to Bluefield (on the state line between Virginia and West Virginia; in 1938 it added service to Atlanta, Georgia, both from Knoxville and from Chattanooga (although along rural backwoodsy routes through lightly populated areas, because Greyhound already ran between Chattanooga and Atlanta through more populous areas in north Georgia via Rome, Dalton, and Calhoun).

The TCC also provided extensive local commuter service from Knoxville to Kingston, Rockwood, Harriman, Oliver Springs, and (especially during World War II) to Oak Ridge (still sometimes called the Secret City). Oak Ridge was the site of the headquarters of the top-secret Manhattan Project, which in 1945 produced the world's first nuclear weapons.

== A sharing arrangement ==
The Tennessee Coach Company and the other carrier – first the UTC, later the CCC, even later the Southeastern GL – shared their joint certificate (for the route between Nashville and Knoxville) in an unusual way: One carrier ran in one direction on any given scheduled trip, then the other carrier ran in that direction on that same schedule the next day, and vice versa. That is, they ran in opposite directions, and they changed directions each day.

That plan continued until 1956, when the TCC joined the National Trailways association. With the approval of the federal Interstate Commerce Commission (ICC), the TCC took over four of the nine daily trips in each direction, and the Southeastern GL took over the other five trips each way. The TCC also started one daily trip each way between Nashville and Knoxville along US-70N via Lebanon, Carthage, Cookeville, and Crossville, joining the Continental Tennessee Lines, based in Nashville, another Trailways member company, on that parallel alternate route.

For a short time during the 1930s, while the TCC operated in cooperation with the Southeastern GL, several of the coaches of the TCC (Yellow Coach long-nose streamliners) appeared (with the consent of Greyhound) in the Greyhound livery, complete with lettering for the Tennessee Greyhound Lines (which never existed at all as a separate distinct entity).

== Between Knoxville and Bristol ==
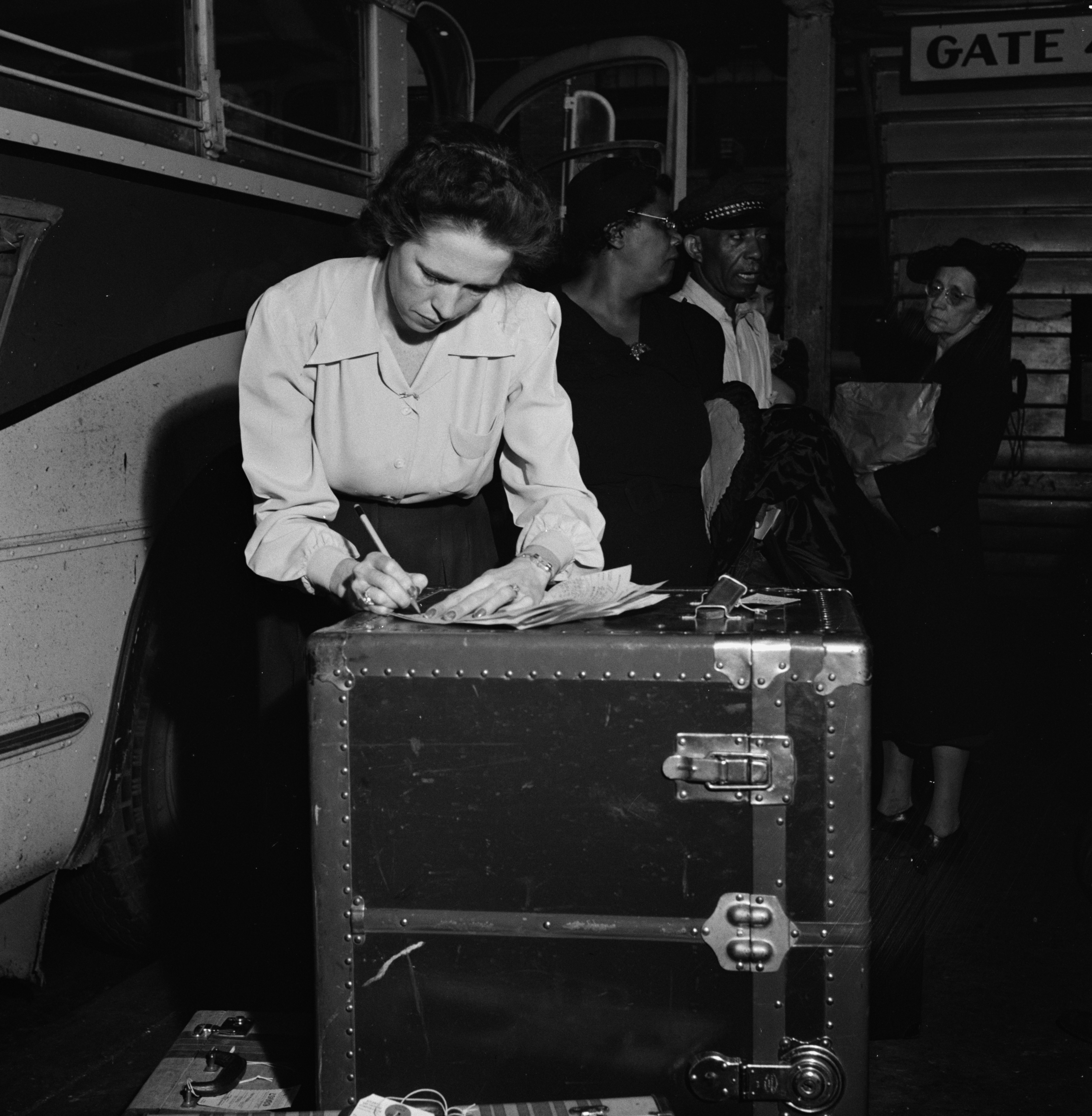
A baggage agent checking bags at the Greyhound station in Knoxville, 1943 by Esther Bubley.

In 1929 – the same year in which the TCC and the UTC obtained their joint certificate for service between Nashville and Knoxville – another significant neighboring carrier came into existence.

Three major players in the early highway-coach industry organized yet another carrier, based in Roanoke, Virginia, named as the Old Dominion (OD) Stages (using the nickname of the state or Commonwealth of Virginia). The founders were Arthur Hill (of the Blue and Gray Transit Company, of Charleston, West Virginia), John Gilmer (of the Camel City Coach Company, of Winston-Salem, North Carolina), and Guy Huguelet (of the Consolidated Coach Corporation, of Lexington, Kentucky, which in 1936 became renamed as the Southeastern Greyhound Lines). They owned the new firm in three equal shares. The purpose of the new firm was to run between Knoxville and Washington, DC, via Bristol, Wytheville, Roanoke, Lexington, Staunton, and Winchester (all the last six in Virginia), along a route which divided between the territories of the Blue and Gray and the Camel City companies. Service began on the day before Thanksgiving Day in November 1929.

The Blue and Gray Transit Company and the Camel City Coach Company in December 1929 together became the National Highway Transport (NHT) Company. NHT soon formed operating ties to Greyhound and began negotiations with Greyhound. In early 1931 NHT began using the trade name of the Atlantic Greyhound Lines, while at first retaining its previous corporate name. In July 1931 NHT became renamed as the Atlantic Greyhound Lines.

In May 1932 the Old Dominion Stages leased its route segment between Knoxville and Bristol (on US-11W via Rutledge, Bean Station, Rogersville, and Kingsport) to the Tennessee Coach Company.

Thus the TCC began running between Knoxville and Bristol along -11W, the leased parallel route, as well as -11E, its own original route.

Later in 1932 Hill and Gilmer bought the one-third interest of Huguelet in the OD Stages, then they merged OD into their Atlantic GL.

The TCC continued to run the leased Old Dominion segment (between Knoxville and Bristol) along US-11W as well as its own original parallel route along -11E. It took part in through-schedules (interlined pool operations) – that is, the use of through-coaches on through-routes running through the territories of two or more operating companies – in cooperation with the Atlantic GL, the Dixie GL, and the Southeastern GL – including those between Birmingham, Alabama, and Bristol and between Memphis, Tennessee, and Washington. It did so until 1956, when the TCC joined the National Trailways trade association, and when the TCC returned its leased right to that segment to the Atlantic GL (as the successor in interest of the OD Stages) – as a part of the deal related to the dissociation of the TCC from Greyhound.

Afterward the TCC continued running between Knoxville and Bristol, but only along its own original route on US-11E.

== Sale of TCC ==
In 1960 the Tennessee Coach Company became sold to a new firm (created specifically to buy the TCC), named as the Tennessee Trailways, Inc., owned in three equal shares by three other Trailways member companies. The investors were the Virginia Stage Lines (the Virginia Trailways), the Smoky Mountain Lines (the Smoky Mountain Trailways), and the Continental Tennessee Lines (a Trailways concern which ran in part between Nashville and Knoxville along US-70N via Lebanon, Carthage, Cookeville, and Crossville. That last firm was a wholly owned subsidiary of the Continental Southern Lines, based in Alexandria, Louisiana. The two latter firms were members of the Transcontinental Bus System (using the brand name of the Continental Trailways), which was the largest member company in the National Trailways association. The TCC retained its old brand name until 1976 despite the sale.

In 1966 the Transcontinental Bus System (operating as the Continental Trailways), based in Dallas, Texas, bought most of the large Trailways member companies along the Atlantic Seaboard. Those included were the Safeway Trails (the Safeway Trailways), the Virginia Stage Lines (the Virginia Trailways), the Queen City Coach Company (the Queen City Trailways), and the Smoky Mountain Stages (the Smoky Mountain Trailways), but not the Carolina Coach Company (the Carolina Trailways) or the Tamiami Trail Tours (the Tamiami Trailways).

Thus the Transcontinental Bus System (the Continental Trailways) acquired the other two-thirds of the ownership of the Tennessee Trailways (which had bought the Tennessee Coach Company in 1960) – through its purchase of the Virginia Trailways and the Smoky Mountain Trailways – in addition to the one-third share which already was the property of the Continental Tennessee Lines, already a subsidiary of the Continental Southern Lines, which in turn was a division of the Transcontinental Bus System (the Continental Trailways).

== Merger into Continental Trailways ==
Eventually in 1976 the Continental Trailways merged the Tennessee Trailways (which had continued to use the brand name of the Tennessee Coach Company) into the Continental Tennessee Lines – at the same time when it merged also the Continental Crescent Lines, another neighboring firm, into the Continental Tennessee Lines.

== Conclusion ==
Thus finally ended the separate existence or identity of the Tennessee Coach Company.

== Addendum ==
In 1968 the Holiday Inns of America, based in Memphis, Tennessee, bought the Transcontinental Bus System (the Continental Trailways), then later renamed it as the Trailways, Inc., TWI.

In 1979 the Holiday Inns sold the TWI to a private investor, Henry Lea Hillman Sr., of Pittsburgh, Pennsylvania.

In 1987 The Greyhound Corporation, the original umbrella Greyhound firm, which had become widely diversified far beyond transportation, sold its entire highway-coach operating business (its core bus business) to a new company named as the Greyhound Lines, Inc., GLI, based in Dallas, Texas. The buyer was a separate, independent, unrelated firm, which was the property of a group of private investors under the promotion of Fred Currey, a former executive of the Continental Trailways (later renamed as the Trailways, Inc., TWI, also based in Dallas), which was the largest member company in the National Trailways trade association.

Later in that same year, 1987, the Greyhound Lines, Inc., the GLI, the new firm based in Dallas, further bought the Trailways, Inc., the TWI, its largest competitor, and merged it into the GLI.

The lenders and the other investors of the GLI ousted Fred Currey as the chief executive officer (CEO) after the firm went into bankruptcy in 1990.

The GLI has continued to experience difficulties and lackluster performance under a succession of new owners and new executives, while continuing to reduce its level of service. The reductions consist of hauling fewer passengers aboard fewer coaches on fewer trips along fewer routes with fewer stops in fewer communities in fewer states, doing so on fewer days (that is, increasingly operating some trips fewer than seven days per week), and using fewer through-coaches, thus requiring passengers to make more transfers (from one coach to another).

Now a few pieces of the Tennessee Coach Company still exist, but only as unrecognizable parts of the Greyhound Lines.

== See also ==
- The Greyhound Corporation
- Atlantic Greyhound Lines
- Capitol Greyhound Lines
- Central Greyhound Lines
- Dixie Greyhound Lines
- Florida Greyhound Lines
- Great Lakes Greyhound Lines
- New England Greyhound Lines
- Southeastern Greyhound Lines
- Teche Greyhound Lines
