= Dixie Greyhound Lines =

American commercial intercity bus service

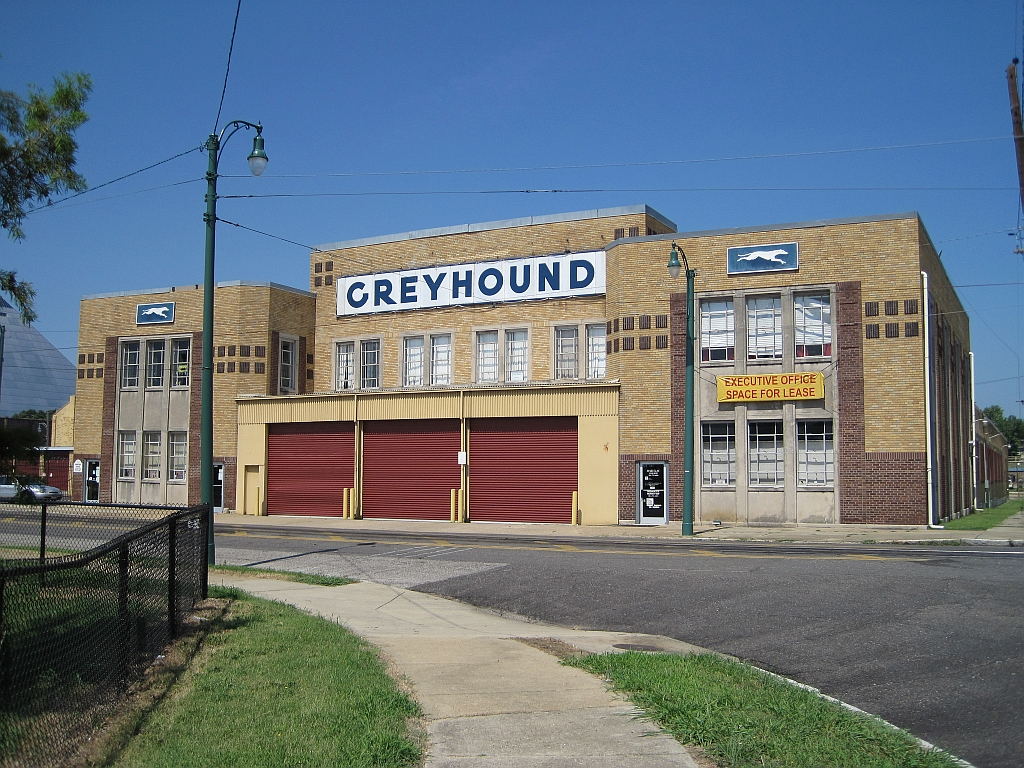
- Dixie Greyhound Bus Lines Complex; Main St, Memphis, Tenn. (2010 Photo)
- Traded as: Greyhound Lines
- Predecessor: Smith Motor Coach Company
- Founded: 1925
- Founder: James Frederick Smith
- Defunct: October 1954 (merged, combined)
- Successor: Southeastern Greyhound Lines
- Area served: Tennessee, Indiana, Missouri, Alabama, Louisiana

The Dixie Greyhound Lines (called also Dixie or DGL), a highway-coach carrier, was a Greyhound regional operating company, based in Memphis, Tennessee, USA, from 1930 until 1954, when it (along with the Teche Greyhound Lines) became merged into the Southeastern Greyhound Lines, a neighboring operating company.

== Origin ==
The Dixie Greyhound Lines (GL) began in 1925 in Memphis (on the Mississippi River and in the southwest corner of Tennessee) as the Smith Motor Coach Company, when James Frederick Smith, a former (and successful) truck salesman, received a used truck as a gift from his previous employer (John Fisher, a dealer, who owned the Memphis Motor Company).

Smith removed the truck body, built a 12-seat bus body instead on the chassis, and started driving the vehicle himself, first between Memphis and Rosemark, northeast of Millington, in the north end of Shelby County (of which Memphis is the seat), about 25 miles from downtown Memphis to the north-northeast on state road 14 (an alternate route to Brownsville), and soon also between Memphis and Bolivar, about 66 miles to the east on US highway 64, on the way to Chattanooga.

James Frederick Smith was the son of Captain James Buchanan "Jim Buck" Smith, who commanded steamboats on the rivers Mississippi, Ohio, Tennessee, and Cumberland – for several owners, including the Ryman Line, the property of Captain Tom Ryman, who in 1892 gave the funds for the construction of the Union Gospel Tabernacle in Nashville (which became renamed as the Ryman Auditorium after the benefactor died in 1904, and which served as the home of the Grand Ole Opry from 1943 until 1974). Early in his life (before age 20) young Smith discarded his first name, strongly preferring to be known as Fred or Frederick. In late 1909, after a devastating downturn in the waterborne trade, both the father and the son worked temporarily for Clarence Saunders, the famous wholesale grocer in Memphis, the inventor of the concept of self-service retail grocery stores, the builder and the owner of the Pink Palace mansion (later and now a museum), and the man who made and lost a fortune as the founder of the Piggly Wiggly grocery-store chain.]

== Development ==
By the end of his second year in business, Smith owned and ran 25 coaches; by the end of his third year, he had 60. [In the early years Fred operated in Memphis his own plant in which he built his bus bodies and mounted them on the truck chassis.]

During its first four years the Smith Motor Coach Company started two more routes – to Covington and on to Dyersburg, about 75 miles to the north on US-51, and to Jackson, about 82 miles to the east-northeast on US-70 – then extended three routes – the Jackson line to Nashville (the capital of the Volunteer State and in the center of it), the Dyersburg line to Union City, and the Bolivar line to Selmer and soon onward to the east along the southern margin of the state to Chattanooga.

Even more growth came quickly, taking the firm outside Tennessee: In 1930 the Smith company reached Paducah in Kentucky, Evansville in Indiana, and Saint Louis in Missouri, and in the next year, 1931, it reached Birmingham in Alabama and Jackson in Mississippi (on the way to New Orleans in Louisiana).

== As a Greyhound company ==
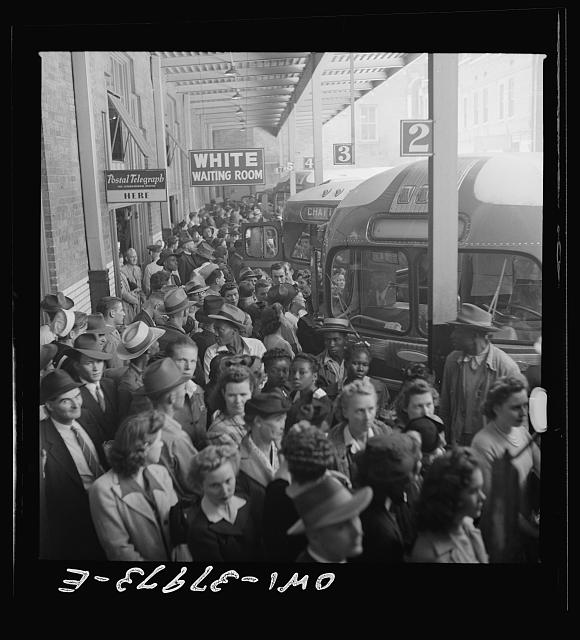
Dixie Greyhound Lines' Memphis Terminal, September 1943

In 1931 The Greyhound Corporation bought a controlling (majority) interest in the Smith Motor Coach Company, renamed it as the Dixie Greyhound Lines, and appointed Frederick Smith as the president of the DGL (as a subsidiary of the parent Greyhound firm).

Later in 1931 Dixie reached as far north as Springfield and Effingham (both in Illinois and on the way to Chicago), thereby completing a Greyhound direct through-route between Chicago and New Orleans via Memphis, by connecting with other Greyhound regional companies to the north (the Illinois GL, later the Central GL, even later the Great Lakes GL) and to the south (the Teche GL).

In 1932 Smith (along with J.C. Stedman, an entrepreneur from Houston, Texas) also founded the Toddle House restaurant chain, based too in Memphis. For the next several years the chain expanded through a number of states, opening as many as 50 new stores per year. [Toddle House in 1955 served as the pattern for the creation of the Waffle House chain, partly because one of the founders of the latter had worked as a manager for the former (even while taking part in founding the latter).]

In January 1930 Fred Smith drew a brother, Earl William Smith Sr., two years younger than he, into the management of the Dixie GL (and later into Toddle House as well). [Earl had worked (in both passenger service and dining-car operations) for the Frisco (SL&SF) Railway and the Santa Fe (AT&SF) Railroad – and for the Fred Harvey organization in the hospitality industry in the Far West.]

Fred also served a short time as a commissioned officer in the US Naval Reserve during World War II.

In 1948 Fred Smith suddenly died, and Earl succeeded Fred as the president of Dixie; then in 1949 The Greyhound Corporation bought the minority interest of the Smith family. Earl remained as the president of Dixie (as a division of the parent Greyhound firm) until -54, when Greyhound merged the DGL into the Southeastern GL (called also Southeastern, SEG, SEGL, or the SEG Lines).

Earl then served as a vice president of the SEGL, although he chose to maintain his office in Memphis rather than Lexington, Kentucky, the long-time SEG headquarters – until he died in 1955.

By 1954 Dixie ran from Memphis to Saint Louis, Paducah, Evansville, Nashville, Chattanooga, Florence and Birmingham (both in Alabama), and Columbus, Jackson, and Vicksburg (all three in Mississippi), plus along branch lines to Jonesboro (in Arkansas) and in West Tennessee.

The Dixie GL met the Southeastern GL to the east, the Teche GL to the south, the Southwestern GL to the west, and the Capitol GL, the Central GL, the Great Lakes GL, and the Pennsylvania GL to the north.

The DGL took part in major interlined through-routes (using pooled equipment in cooperation with other Greyhound companies) – that is, the use of through-coaches on through-routes running through the territories of two or more Greyhound regional operating companies – between Kansas City and Memphis, Saint Louis and New Orleans, Chicago and New Orleans, Saint Louis and Nashville, Memphis and Detroit, Dallas and Knoxville, Dallas and Atlanta, Memphis and Miami, and Memphis and both Washington and New York City.

== Merger into Southeastern GL ==
In October 1954 The Greyhound Corporation merged Dixie and a neighboring regional company, the Teche GL (called also Teche or TGL), based in New Orleans, Louisiana, into the Southeastern GL, another neighboring operating company, based in Lexington, Kentucky. The three fleets of the three divisions became combined into a single fleet.

Thus ended the Dixie GL.

== Beyond Dixie GL ==
After that merger the expanded SEG Lines served 12 states along 13,227 route-miles of highways – from Cincinnati (in Ohio), Saint Louis, Memphis, Vicksburg, Baton Rouge, New Orleans, and Lake Charles (all the last three in Louisiana) – to Savannah (in Georgia) and Jacksonville (in Florida) – from the Mississippi River to the Atlantic Ocean and from the Ohio River to the Gulf of Mexico.

In October 1957 The Greyhound Corporation merged also the Florida GL (called also FGL), one more neighboring operating company, based in Jacksonville, Florida, into the SEGL.

In November 1960 Greyhound further merged the Atlantic GL (called also Atlantic or AGL), yet another neighboring regional company, based in Charleston, West Virginia, with – not into but rather with – the Southeastern GL – thereby creating the Southern Division of The Greyhound Corporation (called also the Southern GL), the third of four huge new divisions (along with Central, Eastern, and Western).

Thus ended the Southeastern GL, and thus began the Southern GL.

Later (about 1966) The Greyhound Corporation reorganized again, into just two humongous divisions, named as the Greyhound Lines East (GLE) and the Greyhound Lines West (GLW); even later (about 1970) it eliminated those two divisions, thus leaving a single gargantuan undivided nationwide fleet.

When the Southern GL came into existence, the headquarters functions became gradually transferred from Lexington, Kentucky, and Charleston, West Virginia, to Atlanta, Georgia; when the GLE arose, many of those administrative functions became shifted to Cleveland, Ohio; later yet those functions migrated to Chicago, Illinois, then to Phoenix, Arizona, when (in 1971) The Greyhound Corporation moved its corporate headquarters from Chicago to a new building in Phoenix.

In 1987 The Greyhound Corporation (the original umbrella Greyhound firm), which had become widely diversified far beyond passenger transportation, sold its entire highway-coach operating business (its core bus business) to a new company, named as the Greyhound Lines, Inc., called also GLI, based in Dallas, Texas – a separate, independent, unrelated firm, which was the property of a group of private investors under the promotion of Fred Currey, a former executive of the Continental Trailways (later renamed as the Trailways, Inc., called also TWI, also based in Dallas), which was by far the largest member company in the Trailways trade association (then named as the National Trailways Bus System).

Later in 1987 the Greyhound Lines, Inc., the GLI, the new firm based in Dallas, further bought also the Trailways, Inc., the TWI, its largest competitor, and merged it into the GLI.

The lenders and the other investors of the GLI ousted Fred Currey (as the chief executive officer) after the firm went into bankruptcy in 1990.

The GLI has continued to experience difficulties and lackluster performance under a succession of new owners and new executives – while continuing to reduce its level of service – by hauling fewer passengers aboard fewer coaches on fewer trips along fewer routes with fewer stops in fewer communities in fewer states – and by doing so on fewer days – that is, increasingly operating some trips less often than every day (fewer than seven days per week) – and by using fewer through-coaches, thus requiring passengers to make more transfers (from one coach to another).

After the sale to the GLI, The Greyhound Corporation changed its name to the Greyhound-Dial Corporation, then the Dial Corporation, then the Viad Corporation. [The contrived name Viad appears to be a curious respelling of the former name Dial – if one scrambles the letters D, I, and A, then turns the V upside down and regards it as the Greek letter lambda – Λ – that is, the Greek equivalent of the Roman or Latin letter L.]

The website of the Viad Corporation (http://www.viad.com) in September 2008 makes no mention of its corporate history or its past relationship to Greyhound – that is, its origin as The Greyhound Corporation.

== Preliminaries toward Continental Trailways ==
For a while during the 1930s Maurice Edwin (M.E.) Moore, from Jackson, Tennessee, worked as a field passenger agent for the Dixie GL (after first working in 1928 at age 18 as a ticket agent at a bus station in Little Rock, Arkansas). Sometime late in the -30s Moore left the DGL, then he founded the Arkansas Motor Coaches, based in Little Rock, bought 16 Flxible Clippers, and started running them between Little Rock and Texarkana via Hot Springs. [A Flxible Clipper, a product of The Flxible Company, built in Loudonville, Ohio, was a small, short, modest, relatively inexpensive coach with 21-29 seats and a Buick (straight-8) or Chevrolet (straight-6) gasoline engine.] He soon extended from Little Rock to Memphis. In 1943 he bought the Bowen Motor Coach Company (based in Fort Worth, Texas), which had become a major carrier through a large part of the Lone-star State. [The Bowen firm was already a member of the Trailways association and thus was called also the Bowen Trailways.]

Thus began the Continental Bus System, which soon led to the formation of the Transcontinental Bus System, both based in Dallas, Texas, both using the brand name, trade name, or service name of the Continental Trailways, which together eventually became by far the largest member company in the National Trailways association, and which in 1968 became a subsidiary of the Holiday Inns of America, based in Memphis, and later became renamed as the Trailways, Inc., the TWI – which the Greyhound Lines, Inc., the GLI, bought in 1987 and merged into the GLI.

== See also ==
- The Greyhound Corporation
- Atlantic Greyhound Lines
- Capitol Greyhound Lines
- Florida Greyhound Lines
- Great Lakes Greyhound Lines
- Southeastern Greyhound Lines
- Teche Greyhound Lines
- Tennessee Coach Company
