= Great Lakes Greyhound Lines =

American commercial intercity bus service

The Great Lakes Greyhound Lines (called also GLGL), a highway-coach carrier, was a Greyhound regional operating company, based in Detroit, Michigan, USA, from 1941 until 1957, when it merged with the Northland Greyhound Lines, a neighboring operating company, thereby forming the Central Division of The Greyhound Corporation (the parent Greyhound firm), called also the Central Greyhound Lines (making the fifth of six uses of the name of the Central Greyhound Lines).

== Origin ==
The Great Lakes Greyhound Lines (GL) resulted from a combination of three major components: the Eastern Michigan Motorbuses, the Ohio Greyhound Lines, and the Michigan routes of the Central Greyhound Lines (a subsidiary of The Greyhound Corporation with the second use of the name of the Central Greyhound Lines).

That third source, the (second) Central GL, is of particular historical interest, because it had descended from, among other elements, the Safety Motor Coach Lines, in which Edwin Eckstrom, an early investor and participant in the Greyhound development in northern Minnesota, first applied the name Greyhound (albeit in a borrowed usage) to the coaches and the companies and first applied the blue-and-white livery to the coaches.

== Eastern Michigan Motorbuses ==
In 1924 the Detroit United Railway (DUR) Company, an electric interurban rail carrier, formed a highway-coach subsidiary, then named as the People's Motor Coach (PMC) Company, to enable its parent firm to reduce its operating costs and to enhance its competitive position against an increasing number of rivals operating buses on the improving roads. [The DUR Company had already become involved in the first of its two bankruptcies and reorganizations.]

During the following years the PMC Company developed an extensive bus system, mostly by the acquisition of pre-existing smaller companies, operating along both suburban and intercity routes.

In one notable event, late in 1924 the DUR Company bought the Detroit-Toledo Transportation Company from Ralph A.L. Bogan, another original busman from northern Minnesota. Bogan (along with Swan Sundstrom, another early driver in Hibbing, Minnesota, and elsewhere) had (in 1923) used the brand name, trade name, or service name of the Blue Goose Lines, as he had previously used the same brand name for one other bus company (the Gray Motor Stage Line, running in Wisconsin, between Janesville and Watertown) and later (in 1925) used it again for a third firm (running in Indiana, from Indianapolis southward to Evansville and northward to Kokomo and soon onward to Fort Wayne). The DUR Company extended the name of the Blue Goose Lines (and the image of a blue goose) to its entire intercity system.

Eventually all three of those Bogan routes became segments of the growing Greyhound route network; Bogan himself continued as a key player at Greyhound, serving eventually as the vice president during the presidency of Orville Swan Caesar (1946–56) of The Greyhound Corporation, after the retirement of Carl Eric Wickman, the principal founder of Greyhound. [Sundstrom later became the president of the Pennsylvania GL.]

Other acquired firms included the White Star Motorbus Company, the Wolverine Transit Company, the Star Motor Coach Line, and the Highway Motorbus Company.

The DUR Company in 1928 became renamed as the Eastern Michigan (EM) Railways, and the PMC Company, its highway-coach subsidiary, in 1928 became likewise renamed as the Eastern Michigan Motorbuses (EMM); then in -31 the EM Railways went into the second (and final) bankruptcy and reorganization.

The renamed EMM continued to acquire other firms, including the Southern Michigan Transportation Company, the Great Lakes Motor Bus Company, and the Grosse Ile Rapid Transit Company (which had begun in 1919 as the Grosse Ile Transportation Company).

Despite the lack of success of the parent EM Railways, by 1938 the subsidiary EM Motorbuses had become the largest intrastate bus company in the Wolverine State.

Then The Greyhound Corporation, the parent Greyhound firm, bought a controlling (majority) interest in the EMM under the supervision of the receivers (and the court) in bankruptcy.

However, the federal Interstate Commerce Commission (ICC) did not at first allow Greyhound to exercise control over the EMM or to merge it into Greyhound, not until 1941, after a change in the membership of the ICC.

Because of the large size of the EMM, its route network, and its operations, The Greyhound Corporation created a new subsidiary, named as the Great Lakes Greyhound Lines, which in 1941 took over the EMM.

== Ohio Greyhound Lines ==
In 1941, when the Great Lakes GL came into existence, The Greyhound Corporation merged the Ohio GL into the new Great Lakes GL.

The Ohio GL had run between Detroit and Louisville (in Kentucky) via Toledo, Dayton, and Cincinnati (all three in Ohio), plus along a detached route between Evansville and Indianapolis (both in Indiana).

[The route segment between Louisville and Cincinnati had come from the Southland Transportation Company, which Harris Spearin, with the backing and financing of Wickman in Minnesota, had founded in 1925, after (in 1923) he sold his White Bus Lines, running three routes based in Duluth, Minnesota, to Wickman's Mesaba Motors Company (a predecessor of the Motor Transit Corporation, which in 1929 became renamed as The Greyhound Corporation – with an uppercase T, because the word "the" was an integral part of the legal name of the corporate entity).]

To comply with an Indiana statute (one which required that corporations doing business in the Hoosier State be domiciled there), Greyhound created a paper administrative corporation, based in Indiana and named as the Great Lakes Greyhound Lines of Indiana, to conduct the route between Evansville and Indianapolis. [The Ohio GL (running 1935–41) had likewise been based in Indiana, as had been the predecessor Central GL (1930–35), which had made the first use of the name of the Central Greyhound Lines, and as had been the earlier predecessor Greyhound Lines, Inc., GLI, of Indiana, which (in 1927) had started Greyhound service between Chicago (in Illinois) and Indianapolis, and which had made the first use of the name of the Greyhound Lines.]

In 1928 the Motor Transit Corporation (MTC), before it became renamed as The Greyhound Corporation, bought the Detroit and Cincinnati Coach Lines, using the brand name, trade name, or service name of the Sunny South Lines, running between those two named cities, thereby gaining the major part of the Greyhound route between Detroit and Louisville. [The seller of the Sunny South Lines was Walter Nisun, who had founded it, and who later (about 1934) sold to the Pennsylvania GL another of his properties, running between Detroit and Saint Louis (in Missouri) via Fort Wayne and Indianapolis.]

[In 1930, during the formation of the Pennsylvania GL, The Greyhound Corporation transferred the routes of the GLI of Indiana – to the Pennsylvania GL and to another new subsidiary, named originally as the (first) Central GL. The Pennsylvania GL got the routes paralleling and coinciding with those of the Pennsylvania Railroad, which made a minority investment in the Pennsylvania GL, and the (first) Central GL got the other routes of the GLI of Indiana (that is, the ones between Indianapolis and Evansville and between Detroit and Louisville).]

[The (first) Central GL in 1935 became renamed (as the Ohio GL) to allow Greyhound to reassign the name Central to a different subsidiary, in the Midwest and the Northeast, one which coincided with the territory of another major railway company, the New York Central (NYC) System, one in which Greyhound transferred a minority non-voting interest to the NYC System, the subsidiary which the Greyhound executives wished to bear a name (Central) to suggest the relationship with the related railway firm (New York Central), as in the case of the neighboring Pennsylvania GL and the Pennsylvania Railroad.]

The Ohio GL continued to increase its route network throughout the Buckeye State, mostly by the acquisition of pre-existing carriers.

== Great Lakes GL of Indiana ==
In 1941, shortly after the creation of the Great Lakes GL, The Greyhound Corporation renamed the Ohio GL as the Great Lakes Greyhound Lines (GLGL) of Indiana, based still in Indiana but as a subsidiary of the main undenominated Great Lakes GL (based in Detroit).

In 1947 the GLGL of Indiana closed the gap between its two detached routes (the one between Detroit and Louisville and the one between Evansville and Indianapolis) by obtaining authority from the State of Indiana to run between Madison and Paoli (both in the Hoosier State), thereby also providing a new direct (shortcut) through-route between Evansville and Cincinnati.

== Cincinnati and Lake Erie (C&LE) Transportation Company ==
In 1945 The Greyhound Corporation bought a controlling (majority) interest in the Cincinnati and Lake Erie (C&LE) Transportation Company, which had begun in 1923 as the highway-coach subsidiary of the Cincinnati and Lake Erie (C&LE) Railroad, an electric interurban railway in western Ohio, which had ended its rail operations in 1939. The C&LE bus firm ran on a main line between Toledo and Hamilton (a suburb of Cincinnati), including several alternate loops, plus along branch lines between Dayton and Columbus, Dayton and Delaware, Xenia and Columbus, and Lima and Springfield (all in the Buckeye State); it also ran extensive suburban operations based in Dayton. That purchase provided Greyhound with the valuable intrastate rights along many route segments on which it had previously held only the interstate rights. Greyhound in 1946 got approval from the ICC and in 1947 merged its new property into the Great Lakes GL of Indiana.

== Safety Motor Coach Lines ==
Edwin (Ed) Ekstrom, an accountant by education and by profession, born in Ludington, Michigan, and raised in Hibbing, Minnesota, in 1917 became an investor and participant in the Mesaba Transportation Company, based in Hibbing, the first incorporated firm (replacing the Hibbing Transportation Company, a partnership consisting of Eric Wickman, Ralph Bogan, and others) leading to the founding of the Greyhound empire.

In 1923 Ekstrom acquired (from Wickman's corporation) a controlling interest in the Eastern Wisconsin Transportation Company (running between Madison and Fond du Lac, both in the Beaver State), which (in -21) Wickman had financed during its founding by E.J. Stone; Ekstrom then went to Wisconsin and took charge of his new property.

In 1924 Stone resigned from the firm which he had founded, then he went to work as a bus salesman for the Mack Truck Company.

Shortly afterward the Eastern Wisconsin concern became sold again – to an electric interurban railway and later (the last time) to the Northland GL.

Later that same year, 1924, Ekstrom, with the backing of Wickman, founded the Safety Motor Coach Lines, starting with two Fageol Safety Coaches (hence the name of the firm, with the pleased approval of the Fageol brothers), running between Muskegon and Grand Rapids (both in Michigan).

Within months Ekstrom extended his route network northward to Fremont and to Ludington (both in Michigan) and to the southwest to Chicago (in Illinois) via Holland, South Haven, and Benton Harbor (all three in Michigan) and Michigan City (in Indiana).

Ekstrom also started a detached route, farther north in Michigan, between Petoskey and Traverse City, which he sold later (about 1926), which (in 1948) the Great Lakes GL reacquired (from the North Star Lines), thereby completing a direct through-route between Chicago and Sault Sainte Marie (in the eastern part of the Upper Peninsula of Michigan) via Benton Harbor, Muskegon, Ludington, and Saint Ignace (all in Michigan).

Ekstrom used the name Greyhound by which to refer to his coaches, and he caused that name to be painted onto them.

Ekstrom's firm also began using a logo or trademark, consisting of a running greyhound dog superimposed on a ring, which bore (on its lower half) the name “Safety Motor Coach Lines” and (on its upper half) the words "Greyhounds of the Highway".

That design, with only slight modifications (mostly in the inscription), became the pattern for shoulder patches on the uniforms for drivers throughout the entire Greyhound system, and it continued as such until late in the 1980s.

Ekstrom also used and promoted the slogan "ride the Greyhounds".

By the end of 1925 Ekstrom's firm appeared to own and operate as many as 30 coaches, mostly Fageols plus a few Macks.

In 1927 the Safety Motor Coach Lines introduced overnight service between Chicago and Muskegon, during an era while nighttime long-distance highway running was still a rarity.

All that took place while the Ford Model T was still in production, before Henry Ford (in October 1927) introduced his (second) Model A.

== Motor Transit Corporation ==
In a crucial move on 20 September 1926, Eric Wickman and his collaborators and investors in Duluth, Minnesota, formed the Motor Transit Corporation (MTC), which in 1929 became renamed as The Greyhound Corporation.

The MTC, a holding company, promptly began buying controlling interests in operating companies in the motor-coach industry.

The MTC on 15 October 1926 first bought the Safety Motor Coach Lines, which in 1924 Ed Ekstrom had founded.

On the same day the MTC bought also a controlling interest in the Interstate Stages, using the brand name, trade name, or service name of the Oriole Lines, running in part between Detroit and Chicago via South Bend and Elkhart (both in Indiana).

Ed Ekstrom then served as the first president of the MTC. It was agreed that, over time, the acquired lines operating under MTC would adopt the Greyhound name and paint scheme.

In July, 1927 Ekstrom, along with brothers, Robert and Alex, sold their interests in Safety Motor Coach and MTC to Wickman then headed to Fort Worth, Texas, where they took over two other firms – the Southland Transportation Corporation, which the MTC had started, and the Red Ball Motor Bus Company, which the MTC had bought – which later became major parts of the Southwestern Greyhound Lines.

During that era many bus companies used the names of animals, often coupled with the names of colors, by which to refer to the buses, the companies, or both (such as Cardinal, Oriole, Blue Goose, Purple Swan, Blue Bird, Eagle, Jackrabbit, and Thorobred) along with colored objects (such as Red Ball, Green Line, Gold Seal, White Star, Silver Line, and Red Arrow) – and, inevitably perhaps, Greyhound.

Several early operators used the word greyhound. For instance, one firm, named as the Greyhound Bus Line, running in eastern Kentucky from Ashland to Paintsville and to Mount Sterling, was one of the carriers bought by and merged into the Consolidated Coach Corporation (in 1928), which began using the brand name of the Southeastern Greyhound Lines (in 1931), and which became renamed as the Southeastern Greyhound Lines (in 1936).

According to the best information now available, E.J. Stone of the Eastern Wisconsin Transportation Company made the first such use of the name greyhound directly traceable into the Motor Transit Corporation (which in 1929 became renamed as The Greyhound Corporation), for Stone had informally referred to his coaches as greyhounds, commenting on the resemblance of them to sleek, slender, swift, graceful hounds.

Many authors, observers, and bus historians have credited Ed Ekstrom (with his flair for marketing) with the first use of the name Greyhound in a way which became the name of the once-great company.

It's true that Ekstrom took the use of the name Greyhound into the MTC when the MTC bought Ekstrom's Safety Motor Coach Lines.

However, it appears that Ekstrom had gotten that usage from E.J. Stone when Ekstrom took over the Eastern Wisconsin Transportation Company.

When the MTC bought Ekstrom's Safety Motor Coach Lines, Ekstrom and his company contributed to the MTC not only the name Greyhound and the image of a greyhound dog but also the blue-and-white livery used on Ekstrom's coaches. [Ekstrom is said to have proposed the use of the name of the Greyhound Lines even before he left Wisconsin (with the support of his associates in Minnesota) to go eastward.]

In 1928 the MTC bought the Southwestern Michigan Motor Coach Company, which had recently become formed, to acquire most of the routes of the Shore Line Motor Coach Company (a subsidiary of an Insull railway property) to the east of Gary, a suburb of Chicago in the northwest corner of Indiana, consisting of the route between Chicago and Detroit via Kalamazoo (in Michigan), an alternate one between Chicago and Grand Rapids via Benton Harbor, and one between South Bend (in Indiana) and Detroit (which extended and made connections with a railway route, which still operates, now under the name of the South Shore Line, between Chicago and South Bend). [The last bus route, between South Bend and Detroit, no longer operates.]

In 1929 the Safety Motor Coach Lines took over both the Interstate Stages and the Southwestern Michigan Motor Coach Company.

During the same year, 1929, the Safety Motor Coach Lines acquired another route between Chicago and Detroit, from the YellowaY of Michigan, a part of the Pioneer-YellowaY System, which Greyhound had bought (earlier in 1929) from the American Motor Transportation Company.

The Safety Motor Coach Lines continued (as a subsidiary of the MTC) until 1930, when it became renamed as the Eastern Greyhound Lines (EGL) of Michigan, which in 1935 became renamed as the Central Greyhound Lines (CGL) of Michigan (making the third use of the name of the Central GL), which in 1936 became a part of the undenominated main (second) Central GL, a part of which in -48 became merged into the Great Lakes GL.

In 1930, when the name of the EGL of Michigan came into use, the firm owned and operated a combined fleet of about 135 coaches.

== Michigan routes of Central GL ==
Starting in 1935, the (third) Central GL (the CGL of Michigan) and then soon (in 1936) the undenominated main (second) Central GL operated all the Greyhound routes in Michigan, including the heavy traffic between Chicago and Detroit, as well as the likewise heavy mainline traffic between Chicago and New York City via Cleveland (in Ohio), including the route via Buffalo, Rochester, Syracuse, and Albany (all four in the Empire State), paralleling the touted "water-level route" of the New York Central (railway) System. [The (second) Central GL (and, later, the fourth Central GL, the CGL of New York, also ran a large route network throughout upstate New York, with one extension to Montréal, Québec, Canada, and another extension from Albany to Boston via Pittsfield, Springfield, and Worcester (all the last four in Massachusetts.]

In 1947 The Greyhound Corporation finished reacquiring the remaining shares of the non-voting stock in the Central GL which (in 1935) it had transferred to the NYC System.

No longer having a need to maintain a subsidiary coinciding with the territory of that railway firm, Greyhound next reorganized some of its routes in the Midwest and the Northeast, seeking a more efficient operation.

== Great Lakes GL as a division ==
On 31 December 1948 the Great Lakes GL became a division of The Greyhound Corporation (rather than a subsidiary), thus losing its separate corporate existence, then Greyhound merged the GLGL of Indiana (the smaller Indiana corporation) into the main Great Lakes GL (as a division of the parent firm) and transferred into the Great Lakes GL all the Michigan routes (including the ones reaching to Chicago) of the (second) Central GL. [By that time the State of Indiana had ended its requirement for domestic corporations there.]

The new division, the Great Lakes GL, took over all the coaches of both previous Great Lakes firms (that is, both the GLGL and the GLGL of Indiana, both the main firm and the Indiana subsidiary) plus all the coaches previously assigned to the Michigan routes of the (second) Central GL.

== New routes for Great Lakes GL ==
In 1955, in connection with the merger of the (second) Central GL and the Pennsylvania GL into the new (second) Eastern GL, The Greyhound Corporation transferred three sets of routes in Illinois and Indiana to the Great Lakes GL:

first, all the Illinois routes of the (second) Central GL (formerly the routes of the Illinois GL) – that is, mostly, between Chicago and Effingham (on the way to Memphis in Tennessee and New Orleans in Louisiana), between Chicago and Saint Louis, between Chicago and Louisiana (not the state of Louisiana but rather the city of Louisiana in the state of Missouri and on a shortcut, bypassing Saint Louis, to Kansas City in Kansas and Missouri), between Springfield and Champaign (both in Illinois), and between Springfield and Davenport (in Iowa);

second, the route between Detroit and Indianapolis, from the Pennsylvania GL;

third, the route between Chicago and Evansville via Danville (in Illinois) and Terre Haute and Vincennes (both in Indiana), plus a branch line from Paris (in Illinois) to Paducah (in Kentucky), from the Pennsylvania GL (acquired in 1954 with the purchase of the Southern Limited from the Fitzgerald brothers).

== Great Lakes GL in 1957 ==
By 1957 the Great Lakes GL reached as far to the north as Sault Sainte Marie (on the Upper Peninsula of Michigan), as far to the east as Port Huron and Detroit (both in Michigan) and Columbus (in Ohio), as far to the south as Louisville (in Kentucky) and Evansville (in Indiana), and as far to the west as Davenport (in Iowa) and Saint Louis and Louisiana (both in Missouri); it met the Eastern Canadian GL (in Saint Ignace, Port Huron, and Detroit), the Northland GL (in Saint Ignace and Chicago), the new (second) Eastern GL (in Toledo and Columbus), the Atlantic GL (in Columbus and Cincinnati), the Southeastern GL (in Cincinnati, Louisville, Evansville, Effingham, and Saint Louis), the Southwestern GL (in Saint Louis and Louisiana), and the Overland GL (in Chicago and Davenport).

The Great Lakes GL took part in many major interlined through-routes (using pooled equipment in cooperation with other Greyhound companies) – that is, the use of through-coaches on through-routes running through the territories of two or more Greyhound regional operating companies – including these:

connecting Detroit with Sudbury (in Ontario in Canada, via Sault Sainte Marie), Duluth (in Minnesota, via Saint Ignace in Michigan), Charleston (in West Virginia), Memphis and Nashville (both in Tennessee), Mobile and Birmingham, Alabama, New Orleans (in Louisiana), and Jacksonville, Miami, and Saint Petersburg, Florida;

connecting Toronto (in Ontario in Canada) with Minneapolis (in Minnesota) via Chicago, with Winnipeg (in Manitoba in Canada) via Detroit, Chicago, and Minneapolis, and with both Miami and Saint Petersburg (both in Florida);

connecting Chicago with Memphis (in Tennessee), New Orleans (in Louisiana), Laredo (in Texas) via Dallas and San Antonio (both in Texas), and Los Angeles (in California) via Louisiana and Kansas City (both in Missouri);

connecting Buffalo (in New York) with both Chicago and Saint Louis (in Missouri), both via Detroit and St Thomas, Ontario.

== Merger with Northland GL ==
In September 1957, in another round of consolidation, The Greyhound Corporation further merged the Great Lakes GL with – not into but rather with – the Northland GL (called also Northland or NGL), a neighboring regional operating company – thereby forming the Central Division of The Greyhound Corporation (called also the Central GL, making the fifth of six uses of that name), the second of four huge new divisions (along with Eastern, Southern, and Western).

The administrative headquarters functions of the Great Lakes GL moved from Detroit to Minneapolis, Minnesota, the home of the Northland GL.

The Northland GL had reached as far north as Sweetgrass, Montana (in Montana) and Winnipeg, Manitoba, as far east as Saint Ignace, Michigan, Milwaukee (in Wisconsin), and Chicago (in Illinois), as far to the south as Chicago (in Illinois), Dubuque (in Iowa), and Omaha (in Nebraska), and as far to the west as Sweetgrass, Great Falls, Helena, and Butte, Montana; it had met (to the west) the Northwestern GL, (to the north) the Western Canadian GL and the Eastern Canadian GL, (to the east and south) the Great Lakes GL and the (second) Eastern GL (formerly the second Central GL and the Pennsylvania GL), and (to the south) the Overland GL.

Thus ended the Great Lakes GL and the Northland GL, and thus began the (fifth) Central GL.

== Beyond Great Lakes GL ==
Later (about 1966) The Greyhound Corporation reorganized again, into just two humongous divisions, named as the Greyhound Lines East (GLE) and the Greyhound Lines West (GLW); even later (about 1970) it eliminated those two divisions, thereby leaving a single gargantuan undivided nationwide fleet.

In 1987 The Greyhound Corporation (the original parent Greyhound firm), which had become widely diversified far beyond transportation, sold its entire highway-coach operating business (its core bus business) to a new company, named as the Greyhound Lines, Inc., called also GLI, based in Dallas, Texas – a separate, independent, unrelated firm, which was the property of a group of private investors under the promotion of Fred Currey, a former executive of the Continental Trailways (later renamed as the Trailways, Inc., called also TWI, also based in Dallas), which was by far the largest member company in the Trailways association.

Later in 1987 the Greyhound Lines, Inc., the GLI, the new firm based in Dallas, further bought the Trailways, Inc., the TWI, its largest competitor, and merged it into the GLI.

The lenders and the other investors of the GLI ousted Fred Currey as the chief executive officer (CEO) after the firm went into bankruptcy in 1990.

The GLI has since continued to experience difficulties and lackluster performance under a succession of new owners and new executives while continuing to reduce its level of service – by hauling fewer passengers aboard fewer coaches on fewer trips along fewer routes with fewer stops in fewer communities in fewer states – and by doing so on fewer days – that is, increasingly operating some trips less often than every day (fewer than seven days per week) – and by using fewer through-coaches, thus requiring passengers to make more transfers (from one coach to another).

After the sale to the GLI, The Greyhound Corporation (the original parent Greyhound firm) changed its name to the Greyhound-Dial Corporation, then the Dial Corporation, then the Viad Corporation. [The contrived name Viad appears to be a curious respelling of the former name Dial – if one scrambles the letters D, I, and A, then turns the V upside down and regards it as the Greek letter lambda – Λ – that is, the Greek equivalent of the Roman or Latin letter L.]

The website of the Viad Corporation (http://www.viad.com) in September 2008 makes no mention of its corporate history or its past relationship to Greyhound – that is, its origin as The Greyhound Corporation.

== See also ==
- The Greyhound Corporation
- Atlantic Greyhound Lines
- Capitol Greyhound Lines
- Dixie Greyhound Lines
- Florida Greyhound Lines
- Southeastern Greyhound Lines
- Teche Greyhound Lines
- Tennessee Coach Company
