= Florida Greyhound Lines =

The Florida Greyhound Lines (called also FGL), a highway-coach carrier, was a Greyhound regional operating company, based in Jacksonville, Florida, USA, from 1946 until 1957, when it was merged into the Southeastern Greyhound Lines, a neighboring operating company.

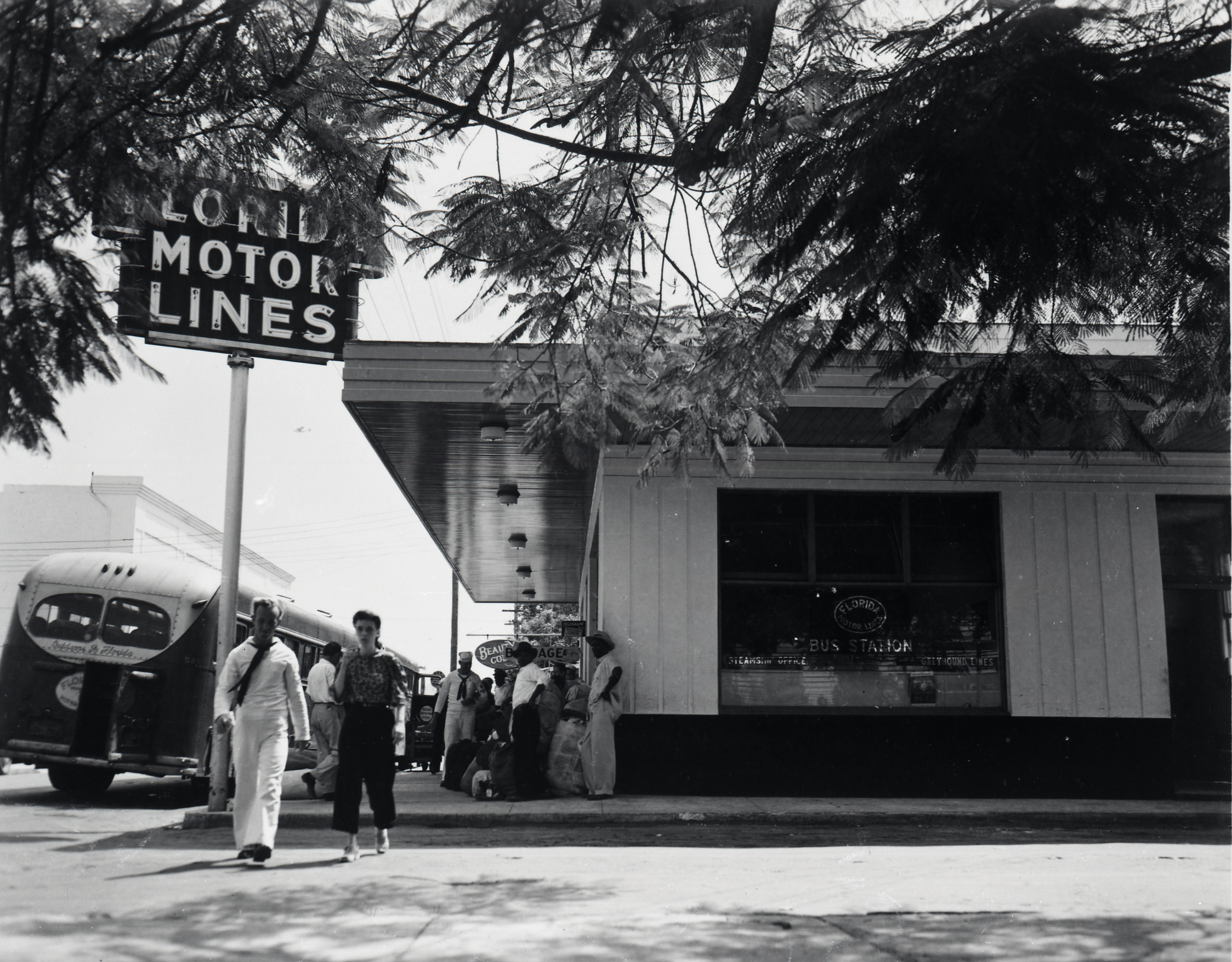
Florida Motor Lines station in Key West, Florida.

== Origin ==
The immediate predecessor of the Florida Greyhound Lines (GL) was the Florida Motor Lines (called also FML), which began in January 1926 – when the firm of Stone and Webster, a multistate public-utility management-service company, established a headquarters in Orlando for the FML and consolidated several properties which it had bought and operated in the Sunshine State. The FML then owned 150 coaches and ran them along 1,290 route miles.

The largest and strongest of those subsidiaries was the Florida Motor Transportation (FMT) Company, based in Miami, which had begun in 1919 – as a result of a merger between two other firms, each likewise based in Miami, and each of which had started in 1914 – the Clyde Passenger Express, running 32 miles (51 km) southward to Homestead, and the White Star Auto Line, running 60 miles (97 km) northward to West Palm Beach. The FMT Company extended northward along the East Coast to Jacksonville in 1921.

The second largest firm was the White Stage Line Company, which had begun in 1918 as the White Bus Line, running between Tampa and Saint Petersburg – eventually, starting in 1924, along US highway 92 (US-92) on the new Gandy Bridge across Tampa Bay, which shortened the distance from 43 miles (69 km) to 19 (30 km) – and which extended to Orlando in 1924 and to West Palm Beach in 1925.

In 1927 the Florida Motor Lines (FML) also began to provide tour and sightseeing services in Miami, Miami Beach, Jacksonville, Saint Augustine, and Daytona Beach.

In 1933 the FML moved its head office from Orlando to Jacksonville.

The FML made connections to the north (in Jacksonville) with the Atlantic GL and to the north and northwest (in Jacksonville, Lake City, and Tallahassee) with the Consolidated Coach Corporation (which in 1936 became renamed as the Southeastern Greyhound Lines) and the Union Bus Company (which in 1941 was bought by and merged into the Southeastern GL).

The FML continued to grow and expand within the Sunshine State, mostly by acquiring other pre-existing firms.

However, in one notable instance (among others), the FML obtained a certificate (of public necessity and convenience) for a new route extending from Homestead (near the tip of the mainland on US Route 1, the Dixie Highway) and continuing to Key West on US-1 along the Overseas Highway. The FML began operating that route in 1936, while the road was still under construction, at first relying in part on two ferry-boat rides which spanned two gaps among the islands until 1938, when the last bridge became complete and open for traffic.

== Purchase by The Greyhound Corporation ==
On the first day of 1946 The Greyhound Corporation bought the Florida Motor Lines (FML), then in the next month Greyhound renamed it as the Florida Greyhound Lines (FGL).

The FGL was first a wholly owned subsidiary of the parent Greyhound firm, then on the last day of 1949 it became a division of The Greyhound Corporation (with an uppercase T, because the word "the" was an integral part of the legal name of the corporate entity).

When Greyhound took over the FML (in 1946), FML ran along 2,750 route miles throughout the Sunshine State – from Jacksonville, Lake City, and Tallahassee – through Orlando, Tampa, and Saint Petersburg – to Miami and Key West – especially along US-1 on the East Coast between Jacksonville and Miami via Saint Augustine, Daytona Beach, Titusville, Melbourne, Vero Beach, Fort Pierce, Stuart, West Palm Beach, and Fort Lauderdale – including local suburban commuter service from Miami to Fort Lauderdale and to Homestead – throughout Florida along all the major routes – except one (in the southwest part of the peninsula), which was the exclusive territory of the Tamiami Trail Tours (a member of the Trailways trade association, then named as the National Trailways Bus System, and thus called also the Tamiami Trailways) – along US-41, the Tamiami Trail, from Tampa via Fort Myers and Naples to Fort Lauderdale and to Miami.

By 1957 the Florida GL took part in major interlined through-routes (using pooled equipment in cooperation with other Greyhound companies) – that is, the use of through-coaches on through-routes running through the territories of two or more Greyhound regional operating companies – connecting Miami and Saint Petersburg with Los Angeles, Houston, New Orleans, Saint Louis, Chicago, Louisville, Nashville, Memphis, Birmingham, Atlanta, Detroit, Cleveland, Cincinnati, Toronto, Buffalo, Pittsburgh, Boston, New York City, and Washington.

== Merger into Southeastern GL ==
In October 1957 The Greyhound Corporation merged the Florida GL into the Southeastern GL (called also Southeastern, SEG, SEGL, or the SEG Lines), a neighboring operating company, based in Lexington, Kentucky.

Thus ended the Florida GL.

== Beyond Florida GL ==
After that merger the newly expanded SEG Lines served 12 states – from Cincinnati, Saint Louis, Memphis, and Baton Rouge, New Orleans, and Lake Charles (all three in Louisiana) – to Savannah (in Georgia) and Jacksonville and to Miami and Key West – from the Mississippi River to the Atlantic Ocean and from the Ohio River to and into the Gulf of Mexico.

In November 1960 The Greyhound Corporation further merged the Atlantic GL (called also Atlantic or AGL), based in Charleston, West Virginia, yet another neighboring regional company, with – not into but rather with – the Southeastern GL – thereby creating the Southern Division of The Greyhound Corporation (called also the Southern GL), the third of four huge new divisions (along with Central, Eastern, and Western).

Thus ended the Southeastern GL and the Atlantic GL, and thus began the Southern GL.

Later (about 1966) The Greyhound Corporation reorganized again, into just two humongous divisions, named as the Greyhound Lines East (GLE) and the Greyhound Lines West (GLW); even later (about -70) it eliminated those two divisions, thereby leaving a single gargantuan undivided nationwide fleet.

When the Southern GL came into existence, the headquarters functions became gradually transferred from Lexington, Kentucky, and Charleston, West Virginia, to Atlanta, Georgia; when GLE arose, many of those administrative functions became shifted from Atlanta to Cleveland, Ohio; eventually those functions migrated to Chicago, Illinois, then to Phoenix, Arizona, when (in 1971) The Greyhound Corporation moved its corporate headquarters from Chicago to a new building in Phoenix.

In 1987 The Greyhound Corporation (the original Greyhound umbrella firm), which had become widely diversified far beyond transportation, sold its entire highway-coach operating business (its core bus business), to a new company, named as the Greyhound Lines, Inc., called also GLI, based in Dallas, Texas – a separate, independent, unrelated firm, which was the property of a group of private investors under the promotion of Fred Currey, a former executive of the Continental Trailways (later renamed as the Trailways, Inc., called also TWI, also based in Dallas), which was by far the largest member company in the National Trailways trade association.

Later in 1987 the Greyhound Lines, Inc., the GLI, the new firm based in Dallas, further bought the Trailways, Inc., the TWI, its largest competitor, and merged it into the GLI.

The lenders and the other investors of the GLI ousted Fred Currey (as the chief executive officer) after the firm went into bankruptcy in 1990.

The GLI has continued to experience difficulties and lackluster performance under a succession of new owners and new executives – while continuing to reduce its level of service – by hauling fewer passengers aboard fewer coaches on fewer trips along fewer routes with fewer stops in fewer communities in fewer states – and by doing so on fewer days – that is, increasingly operating some trips less often than every day (fewer than seven days per week) – and by using fewer through-coaches, thereby requiring passengers to make more transfers (from one coach to another).

After the sale to the GLI, The Greyhound Corporation changed its name to the Greyhound-Dial Corporation, then the Dial Corporation, then the Viad Corporation. [The contrived name Viad appears to be a curious respelling of the former name Dial – if one scrambles the letters D, I, and A, then turns the V upside down and regards it as the Greek letter lambda – Λ – that is, the Greek equivalent of the Roman or Latin letter L.]

The website of the Viad Corporation (http://www.viad.com) in September 2008 makes no mention of its corporate history or its past relationship to Greyhound (that is, its origin as The Greyhound Corporation).

== See also ==
- The Greyhound Corporation
- Atlantic Greyhound Lines
- Capitol Greyhound Lines
- Dixie Greyhound Lines
- Great Lakes Greyhound Lines
- Southeastern Greyhound Lines
- Teche Greyhound Lines
- Tennessee Coach Company
