= Atlantic Greyhound Lines =

Greyhound regional operating company in the United States

The Atlantic Greyhound Lines (called also Atlantic or AGL), a highway-coach carrier, was a Greyhound regional operating company, based in Charleston, West Virginia, USA, from 1931 until 1960, when it became merged with the Southeastern Greyhound Lines (called also Southeastern, SEG, SEGL, or the SEG Lines), a neighboring operating company, thus forming the Southern Division of The Greyhound Corporation (the parent Greyhound firm), which division became called also the Southern Greyhound Lines (GL).

== Midland Trail Transit Company ==
The story of the Atlantic GL starts with the Midland Trail Transit Company, which began in July 1924, under the leadership of Arthur Hill (formerly the secretary and treasurer of the Charleston Interurban Railroad Company) – to run – after buying two pre-existing carriers (the White Transportation Company and the Huntington-Charleston Motor Bus Company) – between Charleston and Huntington (both in West Virginia), along one segment of a highway named as the Midland Trail (later designated as US highway 60).

The Midland Trail firm continued to grow, mostly by buying more existing companies.

== Blue and Gray Transit Company ==
Hill incorporated the Blue and Gray (called also B&G) Transit Company in Charleston, West Virginia in May 1927 – to buy his own Midland Trail firm and at least three other highway carriers (thus increasing his route network) – to make it easy and simple to consolidate all the permits and certificates of all the predecessor firms.

B&G continued to expand, through Portsmouth to Cincinnati and to Columbus (all three in Ohio), through Wheeling (in West Virginia) to Pittsburgh (in Pennsylvania), to Lexington (in Virginia), and to Clarksburg and to Bluefield (both in West Virginia).

== Camel City Coach Company ==
Meanwhile, in December 1925 in Winston-Salem, North Carolina, the Camel City Coach Company (bearing a nickname of its hometown due to the Camel cigarettes made there) came into existence, under the leadership of a merchant by the name of John Gilmer – to run between Charlotte (in North Carolina) and Martinsville (in Virginia) via Winston-Salem – and to expand.

Soon Camel City grew, mostly by acquisition, first to the northwest to Mount Airy (in North Carolina), then to the south through Columbia and thence to the southeast to Charleston (both in South Carolina), onward through Savannah (in Georgia) to Jacksonville (in Florida), through Augusta and Waycross (both in Georgia) to Jacksonville (along a route from Augusta to Jacksonville acquired in March 1931 from the Greyhound Lines of Georgia, a predecessor of the Southeastern GL), to the west through Boone (in North Carolina) and thence to the northwest to Abingdon (in Virginia), to the north to Roanoke (in Virginia), and to the east-northeast through Greensboro (in North Carolina) and Danville to Norfolk and to Richmond (all three in Virginia).

== National Highway Transport Company ==
Hill and Gilmer together organized the National Highway Transport (NHT) Company in December 1929 in Charleston, West Virginia, to buy the capital stock of the Blue and Gray and the Camel City concerns.

== Atlantic GL ==
Early in 1931 the NHT firm (which already had formed operating ties to Greyhound and had begun negotiations with Greyhound) began using the brand name, trade name, or service name of the Atlantic Greyhound Lines (while at first retaining its own previous corporate name), then in July 1931 NHT became renamed as the Atlantic Greyhound Lines (with the consent of the parent Greyhound firm), although Greyhound had then acquired only a minority interest in NHT and not yet a controlling interest.

By September 1931 the Skyland Stages, running since 1930 between Columbia (in South Carolina) and Knoxville (in Tennessee) via Greenville (in South Carolina) and Asheville (in North Carolina), became a division of the Atlantic GL. [John Gilmer (of the Camel City Coach Company) had begun the process of forming the Skyland Stages (which ran through the town of Skyland in North Carolina, between Asheville and Greenville), when in May 1929 he founded the Asheville-Knoxville Coach Company.]

== Old Dominion Stages ==
Further, in 1929 three major players in the developing highway-coach industry – Arthur Hill (of the Blue and Gray Transit Company), John Gilmer (of the Camel City Coach Company), and Guy Huguelet (of the Consolidated Coach Corporation, based in Lexington, Kentucky, which in -36 became renamed as the Southeastern Greyhound Lines) – organized yet another carrier, based in Roanoke, named as the Old Dominion (called also OD) Stages, using the nickname of the state or Commonwealth of Virginia – to run between Knoxville and Washington, DC, via Bristol, Wytheville, Roanoke, Lexington, Staunton, and Winchester, Virginia, along a route which divided between the territories of the B&G and the Camel City companies – with those three men owning the new firm in three equal shares. Service began on the day before Thanksgiving Day in November 1929.

== Tennessee Coach Company ==
In May 1932 the OD Stages leased its rights to the route segment between Knoxville and Bristol (along US-11W) to the Tennessee Coach Company (called also TCC), which then was an independent regional carrier based in Knoxville, and which already ran (in part) between those two cities on its own parallel route (along -11E).

Later in 1932 Hill and Gilmer bought the one-third interest of Huguelet in the OD Stages, then they merged OD into their Atlantic GL.

The Tennessee Coach Company continued to run that leased segment (between Knoxville and Bristol) – and on that route took part in through-schedules (interlined pool operations) – that is, the use of through-coaches on through-routes running through the territories of two or more operating companies – in cooperation with the Atlantic GL, the Dixie GL, and the Southeastern GL – including through-schedules between Birmingham (in Alabama) and Bristol and between Memphis and Washington – until 1956, when the TCC joined the Trailways trade association (then named as the National Trailways Bus System), and when the TCC returned its leased right to that segment to the Atlantic GL (as the successor in interest of the OD Stages) – as a part of the deal related to the dissociation of the TCC from Greyhound.

Afterward the TCC continued running between Knoxville and Bristol, but only along its own original route (on US-11E).

== John Gilmer and others ==
John Gilmer, the founder of the Camel City Coach Company, participated also in a number of other activities during the early development of the highway-coach industry.

In 1928 Gilmer provided much of the funds used in a refinancing and reorganizing of the Eastern Carolina Coach Company (running between Charlotte and Wilmington, both in North Carolina), which became renamed as the Queen City Coach Company (based in Charlotte), which (sometime about 1939-43) joined the National Trailways association (thus becoming called also the Queen City Trailways), and which in 1966 became bought by the Transcontinental Bus System (using the brand name, trade name, or service name of the Continental Trailways). [However, Gilmer ended his involvement with the Queen City firm in 1933.]

In 1933 Gilmer (along with several other principals of the Queen City Coach Company) joined in forming the Old South Lines, which started running between Charlotte and Atlanta (in Georgia) and between Columbia (in South Carolina) and Atlanta.

Gilmer's Old South Lines in 1934 bought the route between Atlanta and Montgomery (in Alabama) – including an alternate loop through Columbus (in Georgia) – from the Hood Coach Lines, which on that route had begun its first service (from Atlanta to Columbus in 1930, then onward to Montgomery in 1933), and which had soon tried (unsuccessfully) to run additional routes in the Peach State – between Atlanta and Macon, between Macon and Savannah, and between Macon and Jacksonville via Waycross.

Hood in November 1934 sold also its other routes – to the Consolidated Coach Corporation and the Union Bus Company, acting jointly, with the Atlanta-Macon and Macon-Waycross-Jacksonville routes going to Consolidated (which in 1936 became renamed as the Southeastern Greyhound Lines) and with the Macon-Savannah route going to Union (which in 1941 became bought by and merged into the Southeastern GL) – thus providing Consolidated and Union (and therefore later Greyhound) not only a new route between Macon and Savannah and a parallel alternate route between Atlanta and Macon but also a quicker alternate route between Macon and Jacksonville (about 50 miles shorter than the older route via Valdosta in Georgia and Lake City in Florida).

After that last sale the Hood firm, holding no other route, went out of business.

In 1935 the Atlantic GL bought the Old South routes to Atlanta from Charlotte and from Columbia, thus preparing to establish connections in Atlanta with the Teche GL and the Southeastern GL.

In February 1936 the Teche GL bought the Old South route between Atlanta and Montgomery (with the loop through Columbus), thus completing its route between New Orleans (in Louisiana) and Atlanta.

Gilmer also owned one or more automotive dealerships in Winston-Salem which sold Chrysler cars and GMC trucks.

== Capitol GL ==
The Capitol GL, based in Cincinnati, Ohio, came into existence in November 1930 – as a joint venture (owned in two equal shares) by the Blue and Gray Transit Company and The Greyhound Corporation (with an uppercase T, because the word "the" was an integral part of the legal name of the corporate entity) – to operate a single new main line, between Washington, DC, and Saint Louis (in Missouri), via Winchester (in Virginia), Clarksburg and Parkersburg (both in West Virginia), Chillicothe and Cincinnati (both in Ohio), Bedford and Vincennes (both in Indiana), and Olney and Salem (both in Illinois), along US-50 – a route shorter and quicker (six hours faster) than the best (then available) alternate route [via Hagerstown (in Maryland), Pittsburgh (in Pennsylvania), Wheeling (in West Virginia), Columbus (in Ohio), Indianapolis and Terre Haute (both in Indiana), and Effingham (in Illinois)] – plus a branch line between Shoals and Louisville (in Kentucky) via Paoli (in Indiana).

As described above, B&G (along with Camel City) in 1929 became a part of the NHT Company, which in 1931 became renamed as the Atlantic Greyhound Lines.

The first president of the Capitol GL was Arthur Hill, the founder and president of the B&G firm.

In 1954 the parent Greyhound firm bought the 50-percent share of the Atlantic GL (which part had come from B&G) in the Capitol GL, then Greyhound merged Capitol into the Pennsylvania GL, which in 1955 was merged with the old (second) Central GL, thereby forming the Eastern Division of The Greyhound Corporation (called also the new (second) Eastern GL), the first of four huge new divisions (along with Southern, Western, and Central, which last name became used again (in the fifth of six instances) but with a meaning quite different from its other applications).

== Atlantic GL as a division of The Greyhound Corporation ==
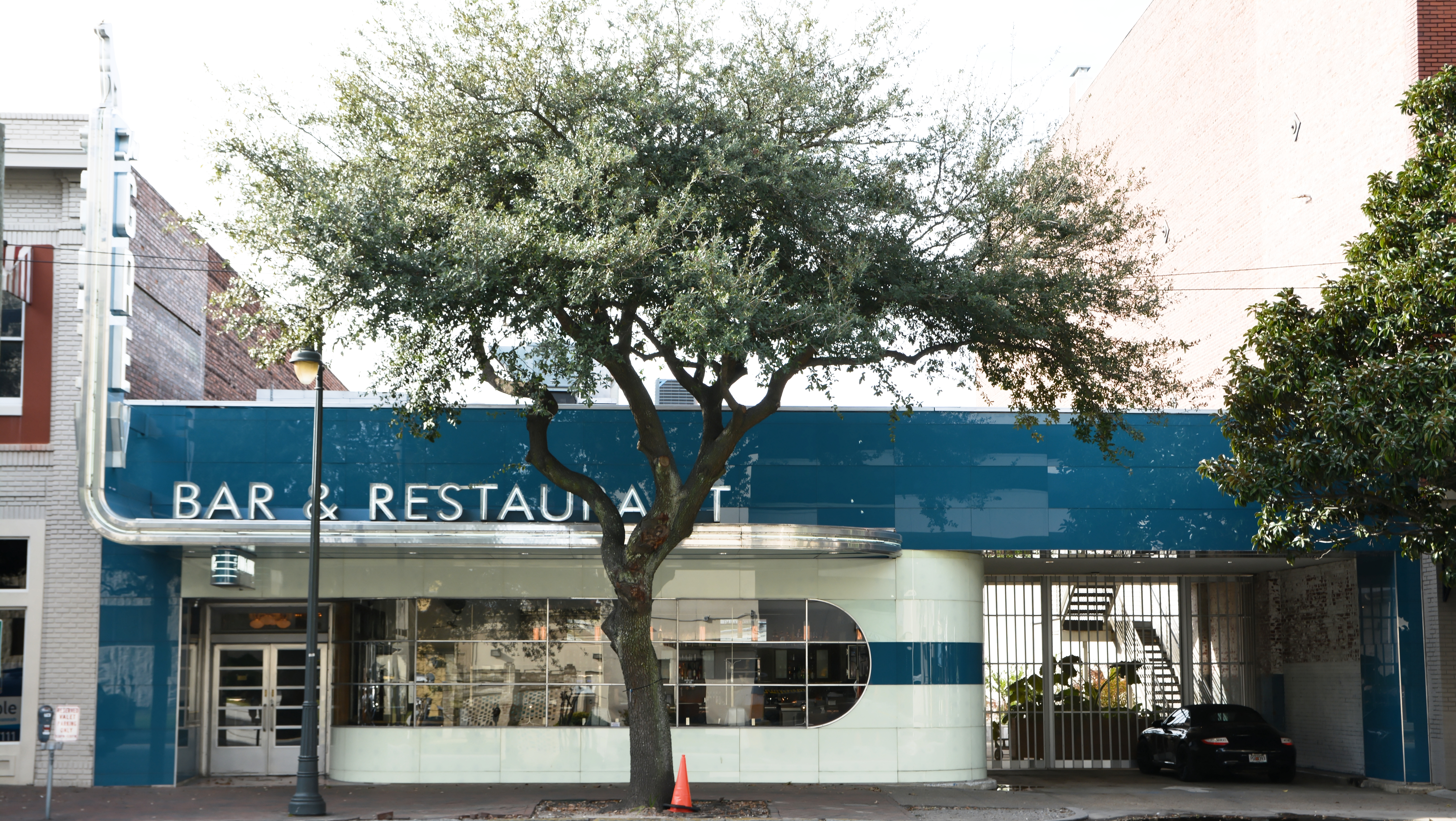
The preserved Atlantic Greyhound Bus Terminal, Savannah, Georgia, (January 2017 photo)

In 1936 The Greyhound Corporation accumulated a controlling (majority) interest in the Atlantic GL, and in 1957 the parent firm finished buying the remaining minority interest in the AGL and then merged the AGL into itself as a division of itself.

By 1960 the Atlantic GL reached as far to the north as Columbus and Pittsburgh, as far to the east as the Atlantic Ocean, as far to the south as Jacksonville, and as far to the west as Cincinnati, Knoxville, and Atlanta.

The AGL also ran extensive local commuter service based in its hometown of Charleston and in Portsmouth (in Ohio), Winston-Salem (in North Carolina), Sumter (in South Carolina), and (in conjunction with the Queen City Trailways) in Charlotte (in North Carolina).

The Atlantic GL then met the new Eastern GL to the north, the new Central GL to the northwest, and the Southeastern GL to the west and the south; AGL also met the Richmond GL in Washington, DC, and in Norfolk and Richmond.

AGL took part in a large number of major interlined north-south through-routes (using pooled equipment in cooperation with other Greyhound companies) – that is, the use of through-coaches on through-routes running through the territories of two or more Greyhound regional operating companies – between various pairs of cities (first between New York City and Jacksonville), including: in the north, Chicago, Detroit, Cleveland, Pittsburgh, Boston, New York City, and Washington, and in the south, Norfolk, Memphis, Atlanta, Jacksonville, Orlando, Miami, Saint Petersburg, and New Orleans.

== Merger with Southeastern GL ==
In November 1960, in another round of consolidation, Greyhound merged the Atlantic GL with – not into but rather with – the Southeastern GL, based in Lexington, Kentucky, a neighboring regional company – thereby forming the Southern Division of The Greyhound Corporation, called also the Southern GL, the third of four huge new divisions (along with Central, Eastern, and Western) – which reached as far to the north as Springfield and Effingham (both in Illinois), Columbus, Pittsburgh, and Washington, as far to the east as the Atlantic Ocean, as far to the south as Miami and Key West, and as far to the west as Cincinnati, Saint Louis, Memphis, Baton Rouge, New Orleans, and Lake Charles (in Louisiana and on the way to Houston, the rest of Texas, and the rest of the West) – from the Mississippi River to the Atlantic Ocean and from the Ohio River to the Gulf of Mexico..

Thus ended the Atlantic GL and the Southeastern GL, and thus began the Southern GL.

== Beyond Atlantic GL ==
Later (about 1966) The Greyhound Corporation reorganized again, into just two humongous divisions, named as the Greyhound Lines East (GLE) and the Greyhound Lines West (GLW); even later (about 1970) it eliminated those two divisions, thus leaving a single gargantuan undivided nationwide fleet.

When the Southern GL came into existence, the headquarters functions became gradually transferred from Lexington, Kentucky, and Charleston, West Virginia, to Atlanta, Georgia; when GLE arose, many of those administrative functions became shifted from Atlanta to Cleveland, Ohio; eventually those functions migrated to Chicago, Illinois, then to Phoenix, Arizona – when (in 1971) The Greyhound Corporation moved its corporate headquarters from Chicago to a new building in Phoenix.

In 1987 The Greyhound Corporation (the original Greyhound umbrella firm), which had become widely diversified far beyond transportation, sold its entire highway-coach operating business (its core bus business), to a new company, named as the Greyhound Lines, Inc., called also GLI, based in Dallas, Texas – a separate, independent, unrelated firm, which was the property of a group of private investors under the promotion of Fred Currey, a former executive of the Continental Trailways (later renamed as the Trailways, Inc., called also TWI, also based in Dallas), which was by far the largest member company in the National Trailways trade association.

Later in 1987 the Greyhound Lines, Inc., the GLI, the new firm based in Dallas, further bought the Trailways, Inc., the TWI, its largest competitor, and merged it into the GLI.

The lenders and the other investors of the GLI ousted Fred Currey (as the chief executive officer) after the firm went into bankruptcy in 1990.

The GLI has continued to experience difficulties and lackluster performance under a succession of new owners and new executives – while continuing to reduce its level of service – by hauling fewer passengers aboard fewer coaches on fewer trips along fewer routes with fewer stops in fewer communities in fewer states – and by doing so on fewer days – that is, increasingly operating some trips less often than every day (fewer than seven days per week) – and by using fewer through-coaches, thereby requiring passengers to make more transfers (from one coach to another).

After the sale to the GLI, The Greyhound Corporation changed its name to the Greyhound-Dial Corporation, then the Dial Corporation, then the Viad Corporation. [The contrived name Viad appears to be a curious respelling of the former name Dial – if one scrambles the letters D, I, and A, then turns the V upside down and regards it as the Greek letter lambda – Λ – that is, the Greek equivalent of the Roman or Latin letter L.]

The website of the Viad Corporation (http://www.viad.com) in September 2008 makes no mention of its corporate history or its past relationship to Greyhound (that is, its origin as The Greyhound Corporation).

== See also ==
- The Greyhound Corporation
- Capitol Greyhound Lines
- Dixie Greyhound Lines
- Florida Greyhound Lines
- Great Lakes Greyhound Lines
- Southeastern Greyhound Lines
- Teche Greyhound Lines
- Tennessee Coach Company
