= Capitol Greyhound Lines =

American bus operating company

The Capitol Greyhound Lines (called also Capitol or CpGL), a highway-coach carrier, was a Greyhound regional operating company, based in Cincinnati, Ohio, US, from 1930 until 1954, when it was merged into the Pennsylvania Greyhound Lines, a neighboring operating company.

== Development ==
The Capitol Greyhound Lines (GL) came into existence in November 1930, as a joint venture (owned in two equal shares) by the Blue and Gray (B&G) Transit Company and The Greyhound Corporation to operate a single new main line along U.S. Route 50 between Washington, DC, and Saint Louis, Missouri, via Winchester, Virginia; Clarksburg and Parkersburg, West Virginia; Chillicothe and Cincinnati, Ohio; Bedford and Vincennes, Indiana; and Olney and Salem, Illinois. The U.S. 50 route was shorter and faster (by six hours) than the best alternate route then available, which ran via Hagerstown, Maryland, Pittsburgh, Wheeling, West Virginia, Columbus, Ohio, Indianapolis and Terre Haute, Indiana, and Effingham, Illinois. Capitol Greyhound also operated a branch line between Shoals, Indiana, and Louisville, Kentucky, via Paoli, Indiana and provided local suburban commuter service from Washington, DC, to Winchester, Virginia, and Annapolis, Maryland.

The CpGL took part in only one interlined through-route (using pooled equipment in cooperation with one other carrier) – that is, the use of through-coaches on a through-route running through the territories of itself and one other company – with the Red Star Motor Coaches – connecting Washington, DC, via Annapolis (also on US-50) with Rehoboth Beach (in Delaware) and Salisbury and Ocean City (both in Maryland), all three on the Eastern Shore of Maryland and Delaware (on the Delmarva Peninsula) – until 1952, when the Carolina Coach Company (the Carolina Trailways) bought the Red Star concern.

The first president of the Capitol GL was Arthur Hill, the founder and president of the B&G firm.

B&G (along with the Camel City Coach Company, based in Winston-Salem, North Carolina) in 1929 had become a part of the National Highway Transport Company, which in 1931 became renamed as the Atlantic Greyhound Lines, based in Charleston, West Virginia.

The Capitol GL met the Atlantic GL (to the south), the (second) Central GL (to the north), the Dixie GL (to the south), the Great Lakes GL (to the north), the Pennsylvania GL (to the north and east), the Richmond GL (to the southeast), the Southeastern GL (to the south), and the Southwestern GL (to the west).

== Merger into Pennsylvania GL ==
In 1954 The Greyhound Corporation (the parent Greyhound firm) bought the 50-percent share of the Atlantic GL (which part had come from B&G) in the Capitol GL, then Greyhound merged Capitol into the Pennsylvania GL, which in 1955 became merged with the old (second) Central GL – thereby forming the Eastern Division of The Greyhound Corporation (called also the new (second) Eastern GL), the first of four huge new divisions (along with Southern, Western, and Central, which last name became used again (in the fifth of six instances) but with a meaning quite different from its other applications).

Thus ended the Capitol GL.

== Beyond Capitol GL ==
Later (about 1966) The Greyhound Corporation reorganized again, into just two humongous divisions, named as the Greyhound Lines East (GLE) and the Greyhound Lines West (GLW); even later (about 1970) it eliminated those two divisions, thereby leaving a single gargantuan undivided nationwide fleet.

In 1987 The Greyhound Corporation (the original Greyhound umbrella firm), which had become widely diversified far beyond transportation, sold its entire highway-coach operating business (its core bus business), to a new company, named as the Greyhound Lines, Inc., called also GLI, based in Dallas, Texas – a separate, independent, unrelated firm, which was the property of a group of private investors under the promotion of Fred Currey, a former executive of the Continental Trailways (later renamed as the Trailways, Inc., called also TWI, also based in Dallas), which was by far the largest member company in the National Trailways trade association.

Later in 1987 the Greyhound Lines, Inc., the GLI, the new firm based in Dallas, further bought the Trailways, Inc., the TWI, its largest competitor, and merged it into the GLI.

The lenders and the other investors of the GLI ousted Fred Currey as the chief executive officer (CEO) after the firm went into bankruptcy in 1990.

The GLI has continued to experience difficulties and lackluster performance under a succession of new owners and new executives – while continuing to reduce its level of service – by hauling fewer passengers aboard fewer coaches on fewer trips along fewer routes with fewer stops in fewer communities in fewer states – and by doing so on fewer days – that is, increasingly operating some trips less often than every day (fewer than seven days per week) – and by using fewer through-coaches, thereby requiring passengers to make more transfers (from one coach to another).

After the sale to the GLI, The Greyhound Corporation changed its name to the Greyhound-Dial Corporation, then the Dial Corporation, then the Viad Corporation. [The contrived name Viad appears to be a curious respelling of the former name Dial – if one scrambles the letters D, I, and A, then turns the V upside down and regards it as the Greek letter lambda – Λ – that is, the Greek equivalent of the Roman or Latin letter L.]

The website of the Viad Corporation (http://www.viad.com) in September 2008 makes no mention of its corporate history or its past relationship to Greyhound (that is, its origin as The Greyhound Corporation).

== See also ==
- The Greyhound Corporation
- Atlantic Greyhound Lines
- Dixie Greyhound Lines
- Florida Greyhound Lines
- Great Lakes Greyhound Lines
- Southeastern Greyhound Lines
- Teche Greyhound Lines
- Tennessee Coach Company
