= Southeastern Greyhound Lines =

American intercity bus service

The Southeastern Greyhound Lines (called also Southeastern, SEG, SEGL, or the SEG Lines), a highway-coach carrier, was a Greyhound regional operating company, based in Lexington, Kentucky, USA, from 1931 until 1960, when it became merged with the Atlantic Greyhound Lines, a neighboring operating company, thereby forming the Southern Division of The Greyhound Corporation (the parent Greyhound firm), called also the Southern Greyhound Lines.

The Southeastern Greyhound Lines (GL) started in 1926 as the Consolidated Coach Corporation (called also Consolidated, CCC, or the CCC Lines) – with the participation of Guy Alexander Huguelet, a native of Charleston, South Carolina, and a lawyer of German and French-Swiss descent, who from the outset served variously as the legal counsel, the general manager, the vice president, and (mostly) the president. [Huguelet had begun his career in transportation by working (for six years, starting at age 15) in several clerical jobs for two railroad companies (at different times), the Southern Railway System and the Atlantic Coast Line, in and around Charleston and in Charlotte, North Carolina.]

In 1926, the same year in which Guy Huguelet and his associates in Lexington formed the Consolidated Coach Corporation, Carl Eric Wickman, Orville Swan Caesar, and their associates in Duluth, Minnesota, formed the Motor Transit Corporation, which in 1929 was renamed as The Greyhound Corporation.

Consolidated, as the name suggests, began as a result of the acquisition and combination (that is, consolidation) of a number of pre-existing small bus companies which extended more-or-less radially on routes reaching outward from Lexington throughout the Bluegrass State – to Frankfort and Louisville (and later onward to Owensboro and Henderson and to Evansville in Indiana), Carrollton, Madison (in Indiana), Cincinnati (in Ohio), Maysville, Ashland (and onward for a while to Huntington in West Virginia), Paintsville, Pikeville, Hazard, Harlan, Danville, Richmond, Berea, London, Corbin (and later beyond to Knoxville in Tennessee via Williamsburg in Kentucky and LaFollette in Tennessee), Middlesboro (and later onward to Knoxville on an alternate route via Tazewell and Maynardville, all three in Tennessee), Somerset (and later onward to Chattanooga via Oneida and Dayton while bypassing Knoxville, all four in Tennessee), Bardstown, Columbia, Glasgow, Scottsville, Burkesville, Tompkinsville, Paducah (for a while), and Bowling Green (and in 1927 onward to Nashville in Tennessee). In September, 1928, Guy Huguelet bought a controlling interest in the Greyhound Bus Line Company from Ezra Polhamus and his son, Edward, who had been operating the bus line from Ashland, KY. At that time, Mr. Huguelet was elected president, succeeding Ezra Polhamus, while M.V.Swift of Lexington was elected secretary-treasurer, succeeding Edward Polhamus.

== Development ==
Consolidated spread farther to the south and southeast by buying even more existing bus operations, including in 1930 the Union Transfer Company (UTC), which had begun in -24 in the Volunteer State. Union, based in Nashville, Tennessee, provided the CCC Lines with the routes connecting Nashville with Knoxville, Chattanooga, Hopkinsville (in Kentucky), and Florence and Birmingham (both in Alabama), plus a link between Knoxville and Chattanooga (both in East Tennessee).

Among the other acquired bus properties were two related firms in Alabama – the Alabama Bus Company (running from Chattanooga in Tennessee through Birmingham and Montgomery to Mobile, the entire length of the "Heart of Dixie") and the Capital Coaches (running from Birmingham through Montgomery to Dothan), both bought also in 1930.

[In the previous year, 1929, the Old South Coach Lines came into existence to buy a short branch line (with a length of about 59 miles) between Birmingham and Tuscaloosa (both in Alabama) from the same Alabama Bus Company, then promptly extended about 93 more miles from Tuscaloosa to Meridian (in Mississippi); in the next year, 1930, Old South became bought by and merged into the Teche Lines (which in 1934 became renamed as the Teche Greyhound Lines), thus allowing Teche to complete its route between New Orleans (in Louisiana) and Birmingham.]

After the CCC began running through Birmingham, it soon started a direct route between Birmingham and Atlanta (in Georgia) via Anniston (in Alabama) and Tallapoosa (in Georgia), as soon as that part of US highway 78 (US-78) became passable or operable.

The SEG Lines also developed extensive local suburban commuter services based in Atlanta, Birmingham, Louisville, and Nashville.

== Relationship with Greyhound ==
From an early date Consolidated operated in conjunction with Greyhound in a cooperative way (with through-ticketing of passengers, through-checking of their baggage, and coordinated connecting schedules, all of which provided advantage to each company along with convenience to their customers).

The CCC sought (among other carriers) the "Greyhound Lines of Georgia", a new and relatively small but significant operation, which by that time had become a single-line company (after initial growth and subsequent paring or pruning), on a route between Chattanooga (in Tennessee) and Jacksonville (in Florida) via Atlanta and Macon (both in Georgia), through the entire length of the Peach State. [In the name of the Greyhound Lines of Georgia, the words "of Georgia" were an integral part of the legal name of the corporate entity, not merely a descriptive phrase.]

That regional Greyhound company in Georgia had started in 1928 as a subsidiary of the Motor Transit Corporation (MTC), the original Greyhound firm, although that subsidiary was then isolated from the rest of the Greyhound empire in that early time in the development of the company's route network – isolated except at its southern end in Jacksonville, which in 1931 the Atlantic Greyhound Lines (called also Atlantic or AGL), another operating company, also reached from the north and northeast along the East Coast.

The Greyhound Lines of Georgia was a result of the work of J.C. Steinmetz, whom the officers of the MTC had sent in 1927 to the Southeast to spearhead the growth of Greyhound in that direction and to provide Greyhound with a gateway for the important (that is, potentially lucrative and therefore profitable) passenger traffic between Florida and the populous Midwest.

{In 1929 the Motor Transit Corporation became renamed as The Greyhound Corporation, and in 1930 the company moved its administrative headquarters from Duluth, Minnesota, to Chicago, Illinois, which had begun to emerge as the major gateway for highway travel between the East and the West. [The firm had already moved its operating headquarters to Chicago.]}

The Greyhound Corporation renamed the Greyhound Lines of Georgia (running between Chattanooga and Jacksonville) as the Southeastern Greyhound Lines and in 1931 sold it to the Consolidated Coach Corporation, with which it made connections in Atlanta and Chattanooga. Consolidated then began operating the SEG Lines along the route between Chattanooga and Jacksonville, thereby making connections (in Jacksonville and Lake City) for various points throughout the Sunshine State via the Florida Motor Lines (FML), which in -46 became renamed as the Florida Greyhound Lines (FGL) and which in 1957 became merged into the Southeastern GL.

Consolidated also made connections in Dothan, Alabama, with the Union Bus Company (not to be confused with the Union Transfer Company based in Nashville), which former Union firm in turn made connections in Tallahassee, Lake City, and Jacksonville with the Florida Motor Lines for points along the Gulf Coast and elsewhere in Florida.

Thus Consolidated connected the Florida market with Greyhound in the Midwest – in Birmingham (and onward to Memphis, Tulsa, Oklahoma City, and beyond), in Evansville (and onward to Saint Louis, Kansas City, Omaha, Denver, and beyond), in Louisville (and onward to Indianapolis, Fort Wayne, South Bend, Chicago, Milwaukee, Minneapolis, and beyond), and in Cincinnati (and onward to Dayton, Toledo, Detroit, Columbus, Cleveland, Akron, Youngstown, and beyond).

== A maverick Greyhound affiliate ==
Through the purchase of the SEGL (in 1931), Consolidated acquired the right to use the Greyhound dog trademark, the Greyhound color scheme (blue and white), and the Greyhound and Southeastern names.

Shortly afterward that same year, 1931, with the consent of The Greyhound Corporation, Consolidated began using the name of the Southeastern Greyhound Lines as a brand name, trade name, or service name for its entire operation (not just between Chattanooga and Jacksonville but rather throughout its entire system) and began placing the Greyhound dog, the Greyhound name, and the Greyhound color scheme on all its coaches, and all the drivers and other workers began wearing Greyhound uniforms – even though the legal name of the company continued (albeit temporarily) as the Consolidated Coach Corporation. For that reason (between 1931 and 1936) the coaches bore the names of both Greyhound (in large lettering) and Consolidated (in small sublettering).

In 1936, however, the Consolidated Coach Corporation became renamed as the Southeastern Greyhound Lines, Inc. The home office remained in Lexington, and the employees continued as before.

Thus Southeastern became a maverick or atypical Greyhound company, one of only two major affiliates which sometimes have been called the non-Greyhound Greyhound companies.

[The other was the Overland GL, based in Omaha, Nebraska, which had begun as two related carriers – the Union Pacific (UP) Stages, a highway-coach subsidiary of the Union Pacific (UP) Railroad (also based in Omaha), and the Interstate Transit Lines, another such subsidiary jointly owned by the UP Railroad and the Chicago and North Western (C&NW) Railway.]

In 1938 the Southeastern Greyhound Lines, Inc., became listed for trade on the New York Stock Exchange (the "big board"), as not only the first corporation based in Lexington thus listed but also the first bus-operating company anywhere. [Although The Greyhound Corporation had previously (in 1935) become listed on the big board, that parent firm did not then operate buses at all, for it was still merely a holding company rather than an operating company, while at first the subsidiaries and affiliates conducted the operations.]

The SEGL remained under separate ownership (that is, SEG was an independent corporation under independent ownership, not a division or subsidiary of The Greyhound Corporation) until the end of 1950.

[One subtle but significant consequence of the independent status was that the coaches of those two independent companies bore the full names of the Overland Greyhound Lines and the Southeastern Greyhound Lines, whereas, starting about 1935, the coaches of all the captive Greyhound divisions and subsidiaries bore the collective or abbreviated name of the "Greyhound Lines".]

Southeastern about 1944 introduced one clever twist along with its use of the Greyhound dog (especially as applied to the sides of the coaches), possibly in part a response to the "Battle of Britain" target-like symbol used (during World War II) with the dogs on the sides of the coaches belonging to the divisions and the subsidiaries of the parent Greyhound firm. The SEGL superimposed the dog onto a compass rose in a way which emphasized the letters SE (for southeast). That usage continued until the GM Silversides PD-3751 coaches began to arrive (late in 1947) with the standard dogs without the compass roses, and until the last of the 1948 ACF-Brill IC-41 parlor coaches and the last of the 1949 ACF-Brill C-44 suburban coaches arrived with their dogs with the roses on the sides, and until the last of the ACF and ACF-Brill coaches with the compass roses later in due course became repainted without the roses.

== A sharing arrangement ==
The Southeastern GL cooperated in an unusual arrangement on its scheduled trips between Nashville and Knoxville with another carrier, the Tennessee Coach Company (TCC), which was then an independent firm based in Knoxville, and which had begun in 1928.

The State of Tennessee in 1929 issued a joint certificate (of public necessity and convenience) to the TCC and the Union Transfer Company (a predecessor of the Consolidated Coach Corporation and the Southeastern GL) for service between Nashville and Knoxville via Murfreesboro, Woodbury, McMinnville, Sparta, Crossville, Rockwood, and Kingston along US-70 (later redesignated in part as US-70S).

The two carriers – the TCC and the UTC (later the CCC, even later the SEGL) – shared their joint certificate in an unusual way: One carrier ran in one direction on any given scheduled trip, and the other carrier ran in that direction on that same sked the next day, and vice versa. That is, they ran in opposite directions, and they changed directions each day.

That plan continued until 1956, when the TCC joined the Trailways trade association (then named as the National Trailways Bus System). With the approval of the federal Interstate Commerce Commission (ICC), Southeastern took over five of the nine daily skeds in each direction, and the TCC took over the other four skeds each way. The TCC also started one daily trip each way between Nashville and Knoxville along US-70N via Lebanon, Carthage, Cookeville, and Crossville, joining the Continental Tennessee Lines, another Trailways member company, on that parallel alternate route.

== More acquisitions ==
Through the years the CCC and the SEGL bought a number of routes and a number of other smaller companies.

The Hood Coach Lines in November 1934 sold three significant routes to the Consolidated Coach Corporation and the Union Bus Company (acting jointly) – one route between Atlanta and Macon and one between Macon and Jacksonville via Waycross (in Georgia), both going to Consolidated (which in 1936 became renamed as the Southeastern Greyhound Lines) – plus a third route, between Macon and Savannah (both in Georgia), going to Union (which in 1941 was acquired by and merged into the Southeastern GL) – thereby providing to Consolidated and Union (and therefore later to Greyhound) not only a new route between Macon and Savannah and a parallel alternate route between Atlanta and Macon but also a quicker alternate route between Macon and Jacksonville (about 50 miles shorter than the older route via Valdosta in Georgia and Lake City in Florida).

In 1941 the Southeastern GL acquired additional important and strategic routes by buying two more existing firms in the Deep South – the Dixie Coaches (running from Florence to Mobile via Birmingham and via Tuscaloosa, all four in Alabama) and the Union Bus Company (running from Macon to Savannah and from Jacksonville in Florida to Dothan in Alabama via Lake City, Tallahassee, and Marianna, all three in Florida).

SEG and Union had become closely affiliated with each other shortly after the routes of the two firms began to intersect in Jacksonville, Lake City, and Dothan – to the extent that the UBC coaches began to appear in the SEG livery, including the dogs, with the names of both the Southeastern Greyhound Lines (in large lettering) and the Union Bus Company (in small sublettering) – and to the extent that the UBC began to operate coaches which SEG provided to the UBC (even new ACF coaches which SEG had bought specifically for the UBC).

[Laddie Hamilton, the former owner of the Dixie Coaches, became the district manager of the SEGL in Tuscaloosa; Clifford (C.G.) Schulz, the former owner of the Union Bus Company, became a vice president and a director of Southeastern and long continued as such (and eventually became the single largest shareholder in SEG) and in 1950 became a director of The Greyhound Corporation (in anticipation of the purchase of Southeastern by the parent Greyhound firm).]

Another major acquisition took place late in the life of Southeastern: In 1949 SEG bought the Alaga Coach Lines, which had run between Columbus (in Georgia) and Panama City (in Florida) via Dothan (in Alabama). SEG allowed Alaga to continue operating separately as a wholly owned subsidiary of the SEG Lines until the end of 1950, when Alaga became merged into SEG. [Alaga is an acronym for the abbreviations of the names of Alabama and Georgia.]

== Purchase by The Greyhound Corporation ==
On the last day of 1950, Southeastern Greyhound Lines, Inc. ceased to be an independent entity with its own separate corporate existence. At the start of 1951, Southeastern GL became a division of The Greyhound Corporation, the parent Greyhound firm, after the latter acquired all of the remaining outstanding shares of capital stock.

By that time, the SEG Lines met the Atlantic GL to the east, the Florida GL to the southeast, the Teche GL to the southwest, the Dixie GL to the west, and the Capitol GL, the Central GL, the Great Lakes GL, and the Pennsylvania GL to the north.

== Pool (interline) operations ==
The SEG Lines took part in major interlined through-routes (using pooled equipment in cooperation with other Greyhound companies) – that is, the use of through-coaches on through-routes running through the territories of two or more Greyhound regional operating companies – including those between Chicago and Birmingham, Chicago and Mobile, Chicago and Atlanta, Chicago and Miami, Chicago and Saint Petersburg, Detroit and Nashville, Detroit and Birmingham, Detroit and Mobile, Detroit and New Orleans, Detroit and Atlanta, Detroit and Miami, Detroit and Saint Petersburg, Cleveland and Memphis, Cleveland and New Orleans, Cleveland and Atlanta, Cleveland and Miami, Cleveland and Saint Petersburg, Toronto and Miami, Toronto and Saint Petersburg, Saint Louis and Nashville, Saint Louis and Miami, Dallas and Knoxville, Dallas and Atlanta, Memphis and Norfolk, Memphis and Washington, D.C., and Memphis and New York City.

== Mergers into Southeastern GL ==
In October 1954 The Greyhound Corporation merged two other divisions, two neighboring regional operating companies, the Teche GL (Teche or TGL) and the Dixie GL (Dixie or DGL), into the Southeastern GL. The three fleets of the three divisions became combined into a single fleet.

Teche had been based in New Orleans, Louisiana; it ran from New Orleans to Natchez (in Mississippi), through Hammond (in Louisiana) to Jackson (in Mississippi and on the way to Memphis, Saint Louis, and Chicago), through Hattiesburg and Meridian (both in Mississippi) to Birmingham (in Alabama), through Mobile and Montgomery (both in Alabama) and Columbus to Atlanta (both in Georgia), through Mobile to Marianna (in Florida and on the way to Tallahassee and the rest of the Sunshine State), and westward through Baton Rouge and Lafayette to Lake Charles (all three in Louisiana and on the way to Houston, the rest of Texas, and the rest of the West), plus along several regional and feeder routes in the southern part of the Pelican State. The TGL met the Dixie GL to the north, the Southwestern GL to the west, and the Atlantic GL and the Southeastern GL to the east.

Dixie had been based in Memphis, Tennessee; it ran from Memphis to Saint Louis (in Missouri), Paducah (in Kentucky), Evansville (in Indiana), Nashville and Chattanooga (both in Tennessee), Columbus (in Mississippi), Florence and Birmingham (both in Alabama), Jackson and Vicksburg (both in Mississippi and on the way to New Orleans), and Springfield and Effingham (both in Illinois and on the way to Chicago), plus along branch lines to Jonesboro (in Arkansas) and in West Tennessee. The DGL in 1931 had completed a Greyhound through-route between Chicago and New Orleans, by connecting with other regional companies to the north and to the south. The DGL met the Southeastern GL to the east, the Teche GL to the south, the Southwestern GL to the west, and the Capitol GL, the Central GL, the Great Lakes GL, and the Pennsylvania GL to the north.

After that merger the newly expanded SEG Lines served 12 states along 13,227 route-miles of highways – from Cincinnati, Saint Louis, Memphis, Baton Rouge, New Orleans, and Lake Charles – to Savannah and Jacksonville – from the Ohio River to the Gulf of Mexico and from the Mississippi River to the Atlantic Ocean.

In October 1957 The Greyhound Corporation merged also the Florida Greyhound Lines (FGL), one more neighboring operating company, into the Southeastern GL.

The Florida GL had been based in Jacksonville, Florida; it ran throughout the Sunshine State – from Jacksonville, Lake City, and Tallahassee – through Orlando, Tampa, and Saint Petersburg – to Miami and Key West – especially along the East Coast between Jacksonville and Miami via Saint Augustine, Daytona Beach, Titusville, Melbourne, Vero Beach, Fort Pierce, Stuart, West Palm Beach, and Fort Lauderdale – including local suburban commuter service from Miami to Fort Lauderdale and to Homestead (near the tip of the mainland on the Dixie Highway, US Route 1, on the way to Key West via the Overseas Highway. The FGL met the Atlantic GL and the Southeastern GL to the north.

== Seeing-eye (or sightseeing) dogs ==
In 1957, as the second version of the GM PD-4104 replaced and displaced the ACF-Brill IC-41 coaches of the Southeastern GL, Greyhound moved the retired IC-41s to a storage lot at the Greyhound shop on New York Avenue NE in Washington, DC.

As the next tourist season approached in Washington, the management of the new DC Transit System, which in 1956 had replaced the Capital Transit Company, felt a need to acquire more coaches (as inexpensively as possible) for its charter and sightseeing operations (in addition to its basic city-transit function), partly in anticipation of expanding its tour and charter activities (by competing more aggressively against its rivals).

Thus the managers of the DC Transit System approached Greyhound, carefully selected 10 copies of the 1948 (that is, the youngest) version of the IC-41 parlor coach and bought them (for a total of only $8,000), repainted and refurbished them somewhat in one of its own shops, and put them back to work.

Some of those cars continued to operate in and around Washington well into the 1960s, thereby running almost as many years as they had for the SEG Lines, although not nearly as many miles as before.

== Merger with Atlantic GL ==
In November 1960, in another round of consolidation, Greyhound further merged the Southeastern GL with – not into but rather with – the Atlantic GL (called also Atlantic or AGL), yet another neighboring regional company – thereby forming the third of four huge new divisions, the Southern Division of The Greyhound Corporation (called also the Southern GL), which reached as far to the north as Springfield and Effingham (both in Illinois), Columbus (in Ohio), Pittsburgh (in Pennsylvania), and Washington (in DC, the District of Columbia), as far to the east as the Atlantic Ocean, as far to the south as Miami and Key West, and as far to the west as Cincinnati, Saint Louis, Memphis, Vicksburg, Natchez, Baton Rouge, New Orleans, and Lake Charles.

Thus ended the Southeastern GL and the Atlantic GL, and thus began the Southern GL.

The Atlantic GL had been based in Charleston, West Virginia; it ran from Charleston throughout the Mountain State, to Cincinnati and Columbus (both in Ohio), Pittsburgh, Washington, through Virginia and the Carolinas, and to Knoxville (in Tennessee), Atlanta, Augusta, and Savannah (all three in Georgia), and Jacksonville (in Florida). The AGL met the new Eastern GL to the north, the new Central GL to the northwest, and the Southeastern GL to the west and the south – along with the Richmond GL in Washington and in Norfolk and Richmond (both in Virginia). The AGL also ran extensive local suburban commuter service based in its hometown of Charleston, in Portsmouth (in Ohio), Winston-Salem (in North Carolina), Sumter (in South Carolina), and (in conjunction with the Queen City Coach Company, called also the Queen City Trailways) in Charlotte (in North Carolina).

== Beyond Southeastern GL ==
Later (about 1966) The Greyhound Corporation reorganized again, into just two humongous divisions, named as the Greyhound Lines East (GLE) and the Greyhound Lines West (GLW); even later (about 1970) it eliminated those two divisions, thereby leaving a single gargantuan undivided nationwide fleet.

When the Southern GL came into existence, the headquarters functions became gradually transferred from Lexington, Kentucky, and Charleston, West Virginia, to Atlanta, Georgia; when the GLE arose, many of those administrative functions became shifted to Cleveland, Ohio; later yet those functions migrated to Chicago, Illinois, then to Phoenix, Arizona – when (in 1971) The Greyhound Corporation moved its corporate headquarters from Chicago to a new building in Phoenix.

In 1987 The Greyhound Corporation (the original umbrella Greyhound firm), which had become widely diversified far beyond passenger transportation, sold its entire highway-coach operating business (its core bus business) to a new company, named as the Greyhound Lines, Inc., also called GLI, based in Dallas, Texas – a separate, independent, unrelated firm, which was the property of a group of private investors under the promotion of Fred Currey, a former executive of the Continental Trailways (later renamed as the Trailways, Inc., also called TWI, also based in Dallas), which was by far the largest member company in the Trailways trade association (then named as the National Trailways Bus System, now as the Trailways Transportation System).

Later in 1987 the Greyhound Lines, Inc., the GLI, the new firm based in Dallas, further bought also the Trailways, Inc., the TWI, its largest competitor, and merged it into the GLI.

The lenders and the other investors of the GLI ousted Fred Currey (as the chief executive officer) after the firm went into bankruptcy in 1990.

The GLI has continued to experience difficulties and lackluster performance under a succession of new owners and new executives while continuing to reduce its level of service – by hauling fewer passengers aboard fewer coaches on fewer trips along fewer routes with fewer stops in fewer communities in fewer states – and by doing so on fewer days – that is, increasingly operating some trips less often than every day (fewer than seven days per week) – and by using fewer through-coaches, thus requiring passengers to make more transfers (from one coach to another).

After the sale to the GLI, The Greyhound Corporation changed its name to the Greyhound-Dial Corporation, then the Dial Corporation, then the Viad Corporation. [The contrived name Viad appears to be a curious respelling of the former name Dial – if one scrambles the letters D, I, and A, then turns the V upside down and regards it as the Greek letter lambda – Λ – that is, the Greek equivalent of the Roman or Latin letter L.]

The website of the Viad Corporation (http://www.viad.com) in September 2008 makes no mention of its corporate history or its past relationship to Greyhound – that is, its origin as The Greyhound Corporation.

== See also ==
- The Greyhound Corporation
- Atlantic Greyhound Lines
- Capitol Greyhound Lines
- Dixie Greyhound Lines
- Florida Greyhound Lines
- Great Lakes Greyhound Lines
- Teche Greyhound Lines
- Tennessee Coach Company
