= Teche Greyhound Lines =

The Teche Greyhound Lines (called also Teche or TGL), a highway-coach carrier, was a Greyhound regional operating company, based in New Orleans, Louisiana, USA, from 1934 until 1954, when it (along with the Dixie Greyhound Lines) was merged into the Southeastern Greyhound Lines, a neighboring operating company.

[Teche, pronounced as "tesh", is a word of French origin, a word (téche) for "snake" – due to a legend (about a large snake in the region) which the natives had told to the early French traders and explorers – from the name of the Bayou Teche in the swamp country in coastal Louisiana.] Correction note: Not named Teche because of a big snake in the region; but, because the Bayou Teche has a snakelike appearance as it meanders through the land curving this way and then that way, similar to snakelike movements.

== Origin ==
The Teche Greyhound Lines (GL) began as the Teche Transfer Company, which became incorporated in Louisiana in April 1920 to operate buses between Jeanerette and New Iberia (a distance of about 10 miles in the region west of New Orleans and Baton Rouge and southeast of Lafayette). The firm then began to grow in steps.

In 1929 the Teche Transfer Company became renamed as the Teche Lines, then in 1932 it began to use the hyphenated brand name, trade name, or service name of the Teche-Greyhound Lines (with the consent of The Greyhound Corporation, the parent Greyhound firm), while at first retaining its own corporate name (until 1934) – after it entered into a through-traffic agreement with Greyhound, and after Greyhound began to buy a minority interest in Teche (which interest continued to grow).

== Wheeling and dealing ==
In 1929 the Old South Coach Lines came into existence – to buy (from the Alabama Bus Company) a short branch line (with a length of about 59 miles), between Birmingham and Tuscaloosa (both in Alabama), then promptly extended about 93 more miles (by application rather than purchase) from Tuscaloosa to Meridian (in Mississippi).

The next year, 1930, the Teche Lines bought the Old South Coach Lines, thereby completing its route between New Orleans and Birmingham.

[That same year, 1930, the Alabama Bus Company – which in 1929 had sold its branch line from Birmingham to Tuscaloosa (to the Old South Coach Lines) – became bought by and merged into the Consolidated Coach Corporation (which in 1936 became renamed as the Southeastern Greyhound Lines) – thereby extending Consolidated from Chattanooga (in Tennessee) through Birmingham and Montgomery to Mobile (all three in Alabama) – the entire length of the "Heart of Dixie".]

The Old South Lines (entirely different from the Old South Coach Lines) was a property of John Gilmer, who previously (in 1925) had founded the Camel City Coach Company, based in Winston-Salem, North Carolina, which (in 1929) became the southern half of the National Highway Transport (NHT) Company, based in Charleston, West Virginia, which (in 1931) became renamed as the Atlantic Greyhound Lines.

In 1933 the Old South Lines started running between Charlotte (in North Carolina) and Atlanta (in Georgia) and between Columbia (in South Carolina) and Atlanta.

Gilmer’s Old South Lines in 1934 bought the route between Montgomery and Atlanta (including an alternate loop through Columbus in Georgia) – from the Hood Coach Lines, which on that route had begun its first service (in 1930 between Atlanta and Columbus, then in 1933 onward to Montgomery), and which had soon tried (unsuccessfully) to run additional routes between Atlanta and Macon (in Georgia), between Macon and Savannah (in Georgia), and between Macon and Jacksonville (in Florida) via Waycross (in Georgia).

[Hood in November 1934 sold also the latter routes – to the Consolidated Coach Corporation and the Union Bus Company (acting jointly), with the Atlanta-Macon and Macon-Waycross-Jacksonville routes going to Consolidated (which in 1936 became renamed as the Southeastern Greyhound Lines) and with the Macon-Savannah route going to Union (which in 1941 was bought by and merged into the Southeastern GL) – thereby gaining for Consolidated and Union (and therefore later for Greyhound) not only a new route between Macon and Savannah and a parallel alternate route between Atlanta and Macon but also a quicker alternate route between Macon and Jacksonville (about 50 miles shorter than its older route via Valdosta in Georgia and Lake City in Florida).

After that last sale the Hood firm, no longer holding any other route, went out of business.

In 1935 the Atlantic GL bought the Old South routes to Atlanta from Charlotte and from Columbia, thereby preparing to establish connections in Atlanta with the Teche GL and the Southeastern GL.

In February 1936 Teche bought the Old South route between Montgomery and Atlanta (with the loop through Columbus), thereby completing its route between New Orleans and Atlanta.

== Background and participation of O.W. Townsend ==
O.W. Townsend, who in 1932 obtained control of the Teche Lines, had begun in the highway-coach industry in 1924 when he founded the Cornhusker Stage Lines (based in Hastings, Nebraska, running between Hastings and Lincoln, the capital of the Cornhusker State), which in 1927 became a link in the chain of independently owned carriers which (acting separately but cooperatively) operated under the collective name of the YellowaY Lines (in an attempt to reach from coast to coast).

Soon under the YellowaY name Townsend ran his coaches across Nebraska between Chicago (in Illinois) and Denver (in Colorado) – and maybe onward to Salt Lake City (in Utah).

In 1928 Townsend sold some (but not all) of his rights (in the routes of the Cornhusker Stage Lines) to the newly formed American Motor Transportation Company, which bought also most of the other independent YellowaY member firms, and which then operated them as the YellowaY-Pioneer System. [On 11 September 1928 a YellowaY-Pioneer coach completed the first regularly scheduled coast-to-coast bus trip in the US (from Los Angeles to New York City) by a single operating company.]

In 1929 the Motor Transit Corporation (called also MTC) bought the Yelloway-Pioneer System, and later in 1929 the MTC became renamed as The Greyhound Corporation.

Townsend in 1929 sold his remaining property (including the remaining routes) in the Cornhusker Stage Lines to the Union Pacific (UP) Railroad, which merged it into its new Interstate Transit Lines, which in 1943 (along with the Union Pacific, UP, Stages, another bus subsidiary of the UP Railroad) began operating under the brand name, trade name, or service name of the Overland Greyhound Lines (after The Greyhound Corporation began to buy a minority interest in each of those two bus companies of the railroad), and both of which in 1952 became wholly owned subsidiaries of the parent Greyhound firm, then became merged, under the name of the Overland Greyhound Lines, as a division of The Greyhound Corporation.

Meanwhile, even before Townsend sold the remainder of Cornhusker to Interstate (that is, not later than 1929), he began another carrier – the Atlantic-Pacific Stages, running between Saint Louis (in Missouri) and Los Angeles (in California) via Kansas City (on the state line between Kansas and Missouri), Denver (in Colorado), and Albuquerque (in New Mexico) – which in 1930 he sold to the Interstate Transit, Inc., a completely different firm (different from the Interstate Transit Lines) with a confusingly similar name, operating as the Colonial Stages, which afterward became renamed as the Colonial Atlantic-Pacific Stages (called also CAPS), and which succumbed in 1932 during (and as a casualty of) the Great Depression.

In 1931 and 1932 Townsend lived and worked in Philadelphia (in Pennsylvania) as the regional manager of the eastern end of the CAPS.

After the second (and final) failure of the CAPS, Townsend moved to New Orleans (lawfully taking with him about 20 of the newer coaches, Macks of the model BK), bought a controlling interest in the Teche Lines, and began making deals with The Greyhound Corporation.

== Further developments ==
About 1934 Greyhound increased its partial ownership of the Teche Lines to a controlling (majority) interest, and Greyhound renamed Teche as the unhyphenated Teche Greyhound Lines; then in 1939 Greyhound bought also the last remaining minority interest of Townsend (first leaving the new Teche GL as a wholly owned subsidiary); and in 1941 Greyhound merged the TGL into itself as a division of the parent Greyhound firm.

By 1954 the TGL ran from New Orleans to Baton Rouge (in Louisiana), Natchez (in Mississippi), through Hammond (in Louisiana) to Jackson (in Mississippi and on the way to Memphis, Saint Louis, and Chicago), through Hattiesburg and Meridian (both in Mississippi) to Birmingham (in Alabama), through Mobile and Montgomery (both in Alabama) and Columbus (in Georgia) to Atlanta (in Georgia), through Mobile to Marianna (in Florida and on the way to Tallahassee and the rest of the Sunshine State), and westward through Lafayette to Lake Charles (both in Louisiana and on the way to Houston, the rest of Texas, and the rest of the West), plus along several regional and feeder routes in the southern part of the Pelican State.

The Teche GL met the Dixie GL to the north, the Southwestern GL to the west, and the Atlantic GL and the Southeastern GL to the east.

The TGL took part in major interlined through-routes (using pooled equipment in cooperation with other Greyhound companies) – that is, the use of through-coaches on through-routes running through the territories of two or more Greyhound regional operating companies – connecting New Orleans with Los Angeles, Houston, Memphis, Saint Louis, Chicago, Detroit, New York City, Washington, Jacksonville, Miami, and Saint Petersburg.

== Merger into Southeastern GL ==
In October 1954 The Greyhound Corporation merged Teche and a neighboring operating company, the Dixie GL (called also Dixie or DGL), based in Memphis, Tennessee, into the Southeastern GL (called also Southeastern, SEG, SEGL, or the SEG Lines), another neighboring regional company, based in Lexington, Kentucky. The three fleets of the three divisions became combined into a single fleet.

Thus ended the Teche GL.

== Beyond Teche GL ==
After that merger the newly expanded Southeastern GL served 12 states along 13,227 route-miles of highways – from Cincinnati (in Ohio), Saint Louis, Memphis, Natchez, Baton Rouge, New Orleans, and Lake Charles – to Savannah and Jacksonville – from the Mississippi River to the Atlantic Ocean and from the Ohio River to the Gulf of Mexico.

In October 1957 The Greyhound Corporation merged also the Florida GL (called also FGL), one more neighboring operating company, based in Jacksonville, Florida, into the SEGL.

In November 1960 The Greyhound Corporation further merged the Atlantic GL (called also Atlantic or AGL), yet another neighboring regional company, based in Charleston, West Virginia, with – not into but rather with – the Southeastern GL, thereby creating the Southern Division of The Greyhound Corporation (called also the Southern GL), the third of four huge new divisions (along with Central, Eastern, and Western).

Thus ended the Southeastern GL, and thus began the Southern GL.

Later (about 1966) The Greyhound Corporation reorganized again, into just two humongous divisions, named as the Greyhound Lines East (GLE) and the Greyhound Lines West (GLW); even later (about 1970) it eliminated those two divisions, thus leaving a single gargantuan undivided nationwide fleet.

When the Southern GL came into existence, the headquarters functions became gradually transferred from Lexington, Kentucky, and Charleston, West Virginia, to Atlanta, Georgia; when GLE arose, many of those administrative functions became shifted from Atlanta to Cleveland, Ohio; eventually those functions migrated to Chicago, Illinois, then to Phoenix, Arizona, when (in 1971) The Greyhound Corporation moved its corporate headquarters from Chicago to a new building in Phoenix.

In 1987 The Greyhound Corporation (the original umbrella Greyhound firm), which had become widely diversified far beyond passenger transportation, sold its entire highway-coach operating business (its core bus business) to a new company, named as the Greyhound Lines, Inc., called also GLI, based in Dallas, Texas – a separate, independent, unrelated firm, which was the property of a group of private investors under the promotion of Fred Currey, a former executive of the Continental Trailways (later renamed as the Trailways, Inc., called also TWI, also based in Dallas), which was the largest member company in the Trailways trade association (then named as the National Trailways Bus System, now as the Trailways Transportation System).

Later in 1987 the Greyhound Lines, Inc., the GLI, the new firm based in Dallas, further bought also the Trailways, Inc., the TWI, its largest competitor, and merged it into the GLI.

The lenders and the other investors of the GLI ousted Fred Currey (as the chief executive officer) after the firm went into bankruptcy in 1990.

The GLI has continued to experience difficulties and lackluster performance under a succession of new owners and new executives – while continuing to reduce its level of service – by hauling fewer passengers aboard fewer coaches on fewer trips along fewer routes with fewer stops in fewer communities in fewer states – and by doing so on fewer days – that is, increasingly operating some trips less often than every day (fewer than seven days per week) – and by using fewer through-coaches, thus requiring passengers to make more transfers (from one coach to another).

After the sale to the GLI, The Greyhound Corporation changed its name to the Greyhound-Dial Corporation, then the Dial Corporation, then the Viad Corporation. [The contrived name Viad appears to be a curious respelling of the former name Dial – if one scrambles the letters D, I, and A, then turns the V upside down and regards it as the Greek letter lambda – Λ – that is, the Greek equivalent of the Roman or Latin letter L.]

The website of the Viad Corporation (http://www.viad.com) in September 2008 makes no mention of its corporate history or its past relationship to Greyhound – that is, its origin as The Greyhound Corporation.

== See also ==
- The Greyhound Corporation
- Atlantic Greyhound Lines
- Capitol Greyhound Lines
- Dixie Greyhound Lines
- Florida Greyhound Lines
- Great Lakes Greyhound Lines
- Southeastern Greyhound Lines
- Tennessee Coach Company
