= Pursuit (company) =

American attractions and hospitality company

Pursuit Attractions and Hospitality, Inc.
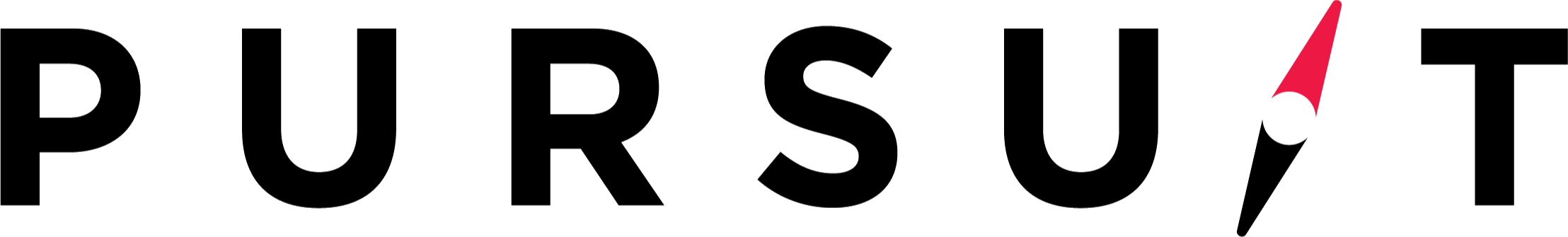
- Formerly: Viad Corp
- Type: Public
- Traded as: NYSE: PRSU; S&P 600 component
- Founded: 1926 (as Motor Transit Corporation); 1930 (as The Greyhound Corporation); 1990 (as Greyhound Dial Corporation); 1991 (as The Dial Corp); 1996 (as Viad Corp); 2025 (as Pursuit Attractions and Hospitality, Inc.)
- Founders: Eric Wickman; Orville Caesar
- Headquarters: Denver, Colorado, U.S.
- Area served: U.S., Canada, Iceland
- Key people: Joshua E. Schechter (Chairman); David W. Barry (President and CEO)
- Revenue: $366 million (FY 2024)
- Net income: $369 million (FY 2024)
- Total assets: $845 million (FY 2024)
- Total equity: $617 million (FY 2024)
- Number of employees: 1,500 Year-round; 2,500 Seasonal
- Website: pursuit.com

Pursuit Attractions and Hospitality, Inc. is an American attractions and hospitality company with locations in Canada, the United States, Iceland, and Costa Rica. Pursuit owns and operates attractions, accommodation, culinary experiences, retail and transportation in and around the Canadian Rockies including, Banff, Jasper, and Waterton; in Alaska in and around Denali, Kenai Fjords National Park, and Talkeetna; in Montana in and around Glacier; in Iceland, and in the Arenal region of Costa Rica.

Prior to 2025, Pursuit was a division of Viad Corp that operated its travel and recreations business. Viad Corp was renamed Pursuit Attractions and Hospitality, Inc. on December 31, 2024 after the sale of its convention and events services business (GES). Viad Corp evolved from The Greyhound Corporation, which established Greyhound Lines and later became a diversified conglomerate between the 1960s and the 1990s. Greyhound entered the travel and recreations industry in 1981 when it acquired Glacier Park, Inc.

== Operations ==
Globally visited attractions that Pursuit operates in Banff and Jasper include the Banff Gondola, Lake Minnewanka Boat Cruise, Columbia Icefield Adventure and Columbia Icefield Skywalk, Maligne Lake Cruise, Brewster Sightseeing, and Jasper Skytram. Pursuit also owns and operates the Golden Skybridge in Golden, British Columbia and historic Prince of Wales Hotel in Waterton, Alberta.

Accommodations that Pursuit operates under its Glacier Park Collection include Grouse Mountain Lodge in Whitefish, Glacier Park Lodge in East Glacier, St. Mary Village St. Mary, Belton Chalet, Glacier Basecamp Lodge, Paddle Ridge, Motel Lake McDonald Lake McDonald Lodge, and Apgar Village Lodge and Cabins. Pursuit also owns Glacier Raft Co. and Glacier Anglers & Outfitters near Glacier National Park.

Pursuit's Alaska Collection includes Denali Backcountry Lodge, Denali Backcountry Adventure, Denali Cabins, Talkeetna Alaskan Lodge, Seward Windsong Lodge, Kenai Fjords Wilderness Lodge, Kenai Fjords Tours.

Outside of North America, Pursuit also owns and operates the oceanside geothermal Sky Lagoon in Iceland, and most recently Tabacón Thermal Resort & Spa in the Arenal region of Costa Rica.

== History ==
=== Motor Transit Corporation (1926) ===
Viad Corp was founded in 1926 as Motor Transit Corporation after intercity bus operators Eric Wickman and Orville Caesar joined forces and consolidated several bus operations.

=== The Greyhound Corporation (1930) ===
By 1930, more than 100 bus lines had been consolidated and recognizing the need for a more memorable name, the company was renamed The Greyhound Corporation. The Greyhound name had its origins in the inaugural run of a bus route from Superior, Wisconsin, to Wausau, Wisconsin. While passing through a small town, Ed Stone, the route's operator, saw the reflection of his bus in a store window. The reflection reminded him of a greyhound and he adopted that name for that segment of the Blue Goose Lines. The Greyhound name became popular, and was applied to the entire bus network as well as the parent company.

Wickman retired as president of Greyhound in 1946 and was succeeded by Caesar. Wickman died at the age of 66 in 1954. Caesar died on May 19, 1965, a day before his 75th birthday.

In 1954, Greyhound established Greyhound Financial Corporation, the captive finance operation of the bus line. During the 1960s, Greyhound began its transformation into a conglomerate by diversifying into other industries: financial services (Travelers Express); food and consumer products (Armour and Company); food service (Prophet Company); restaurants (Horne's); airport services (Aircraft Services International); and ocean cruises (Premier Cruise Line). Greyhound acquired Glacier Park, Inc. in 1981.

Greyhound exited the transportation industry with the sale of Greyhound Lines in 1987. By then, The Dial Corporation (formerly, Armour-Dial, Inc., established in 1967 as a subsidiary of Armour and Company) was its largest subsidiary.

=== Greyhound Dial Corporation (1990) / The Dial Corp (1991) ===
Greyhound was renamed Greyhound Dial Corporation in 1990 and as The Dial Corp the following year. After the renaming, the Dial consumer business became known as The Dial Corp Consumer Products Group.

The company exited the financial services industry in 1992 with the sale of GFC Financial Corporation (including Greyhound Financial Corporation, Greyhound European Financial Group and Verex Corporation).

In 1995, GFC Financial Corporation changed its name to The FINOVA Group, Inc. and Greyhound Financial Corporation to FINOVA Capital Corporation. The FINOVA Group filed for bankruptcy in 2001 and was dissolved in 2009.

=== Viad Corp (1996) ===
In 1996, the company announced the splitting of its businesses into two entities. The Dial consumer products business was spun-off as the new Dial Corporation.

After the split, the company was renamed Viad Corp and consisted of companies involved in airline catering (Dobbs International Service); airplane fueling and ground handling (Aircraft Service International); convention and exhibit services (GES Exposition Services and Exhibitgroup/Giltspur); concession operations (Glacier Park, Inc.); contract food services (Restaura, Inc.); ocean cruises (Premier Cruise Lines); airport and cruise ship duty-free concessions (Greyhound Leisure Services); travel services (Brewster Transport, Jetsave, and Crystal Holidays); and payment services (Travelers Express).

By early 21st century, most of the businesses were sold except for travel and recreation services (Brewster Transport and Glacier Park) and convention and event services (GES Exposition Services, and Exhibitgroup/Giltspur).

In 2015, the company renamed the convention and event services division as GES; and the travel and recreation services division as Pursuit.

=== Pursuit Attractions and Hospitality, Inc. (2025-present) ===
On October 21, 2024, Viad entered into a definitive agreement to sell GES to Truelink Capital. The transaction was completed on December 31, 2024. After the close of the transaction, Viad changed its corporate name to Pursuit Attractions and Hospitality, Inc.

== Criticism ==
Pursuit has faced criticism into the company's private ownership and dominance in Banff and Jasper National Parks due to controlling more than 90% of the paid attractions market in the two parks.

In 2024, the operators at Mount Norquay, Lake Louise Ski Resort, and Banff Sunshine filed a complaint with the Competition Bureau against the company, then-called Viad Corp, accusing them of monopolistic practices following their acquisition of Jasper Skytram. They also argued that Pursuit's bundling practices are predatory and are pushing the operators out of the market and that the practices has led to worsened traffic congestion and vehicle emissions in Banff. The following year, the bureau dropped the inquiry after finding no evidence that the Skytram's acquisition would have a large effect on the market's competition. In response to the criticism, Pursuit's Banff-Jasper CEO Stuart Back defended the company's role as a major employer in the parks and emphasized its commitment to sustainability.

Competition watchdog Canadian Anti-Monopoly Project was dissatisfied with the Competition Bureau's decision, explaining in their report released in December 2025 that the federal government should reverse the company's previous acquisitions to break their monopoly and give Parks Canada a mandate to promote competition and Canadian ownership in the markets. The watchdog remarked that Pursuit operates six of the nine major paid attractions in the parks, along with owning the Brewster Express bus line and ten hotels throughout the parks. Conservative MP William Stevenson for Yellowhead had also called for end of Pursuit's monopoly.

Concerns of the Americanization of the national parks in Canada were also raised amidst with the ongoing trade war between the two countries.
