= Toronto Bus Terminal =

Toronto Bus Terminal may refer to:

- Toronto Coach Terminal
- Union Station Bus Terminal
