= Sunnyside Bus Terminal =

Former bus station in Canada

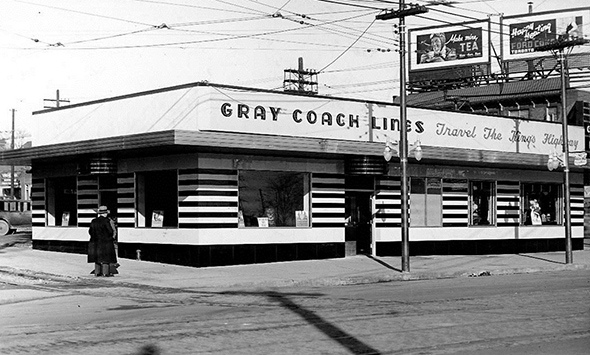
- Grey Coach Lines Sunnyside Bus Terminal in 1936 on Queen Street West (now The Queensway), seen from just west of Roncesvalles Avenue

General information
- Location: 10 The Queensway; Toronto, Ontario; Canada
- Coordinates: 43°38′22″N 79°26′52″W
- Owner: Gray Coach
- Lines: Gray Coach; Greyhound
- Platforms: curbside
- Connections: Sunnyside CN station TTC Streetcars

Construction
- Parking: no
- Cycle facilities: no
- Architectural style: Art Deco

History
- Opened: 1936
- Closed: 1991
- Rebuilt: 1966-1967
Location
Notes
- Amenities: Ticket booth, coffee shop and dairy bar, waiting room, restrooms, travel bureau

Sunnyside Bus Terminal was an interurban bus station located in Sunnyside in the west end of Toronto at the foot of Roncesvalles Avenue and its intersection with King Street and Queen Street West (and later The Queensway) in Toronto, Ontario, Canada. It was across from Sunnyside Amusement Park and beside the Roncesvalles Carhouse.

The station was owned and operated by Gray Coach bus lines, a subsidiary of the Toronto Transit Commission that operated interurban bus routes connecting Toronto with outlying areas throughout southern Ontario. No route actually began or ended at the terminal, which was used as a rest stop and drop off and pick up point by Gray Coach and Greyhound routes heading west from Toronto to locations such as London, Ontario, Hamilton, Ontario, Niagara Falls, Ontario, or Buffalo, New York. The terminal was also a point of departure for shuttle buses to various racetracks, such as Fort Erie, Long Branch or Woodbine. The terminal declined in usage following the creation of GO Transit in 1967, particularly after GO stopped contracting several of its routes to Gray Coach in the 1980s.

The station was opened in 1936, on what was then the western edge of Toronto, and was constructed in an art deco style, including a steel canopy. The station had a ticket booth, restrooms, a waiting room, and, at its opening, the B&G Coffee Shop and Milk Bar. The coffee shop was operated by a succession of tenants throughout the station's existence and later housed the TEOEL Travel Bureau. The Edgewater Hotel was built next to the bus station on the north-west corner of the intersection in the 1930s, opening in 1939. Edgewater is now a Howard Johnson motel.

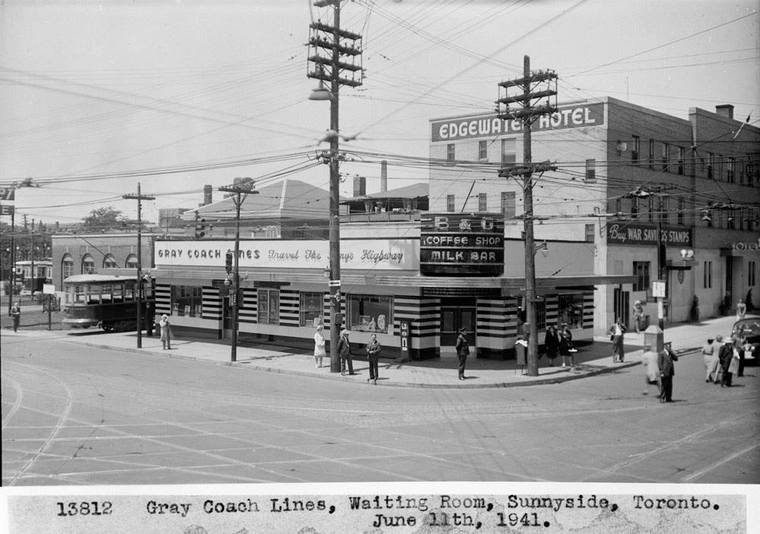
Sunnyside Bus Terminal in 1941, seen from the south-east corner of Queen Street West and Roncesvalles. The Edgewater Hotel is visible to the north of the terminal and a streetcar can be seen entering the Roncesvalles Carhouse to the west of the terminal. Buses would load and unload curbside on Queen Street (later known as the Queensway).

The station was also served by both the King and Queen streetcars. Until its closure in 1967, the Sunnyside railway station across the street provided commuters with a connection to the Canadian National Railway. GO Transit was created in 1967 and took over CN's Toronto to Hamilton route replacing it with the Lakeshore West line which bypassed Sunnyside rail station thus reducing the use of Sunnyside as an intermodal transfer point between rail and coach routes. The rail station closed entirely in 1971 and was demolished in 1973.

Sunnyside Bus Terminal did not have any bus bays. Buses serving the station stopped at the curb, on Queen Street (later known as the Queensway), outside the station, beside the Roncesvalles Carhouse.

Gray Coach was sold in 1990 to Stagecoach and in 1992 was acquired by Greyhound Canada. The Sunnyside Bus Terminal was closed around the same time. The building still stands and retains its steel canopy. Still owned by the Toronto Transit Commission, the building was rented out as a donut shop for several years after Gray Coach's closure before becoming a McDonald's.

== See also ==
- Toronto Coach Terminal, also built for and originally operated by Gray Coach in 1931.
