= Union Station Bus Terminal =

Principal intercity bus terminal for Toronto, Ontario, Canada

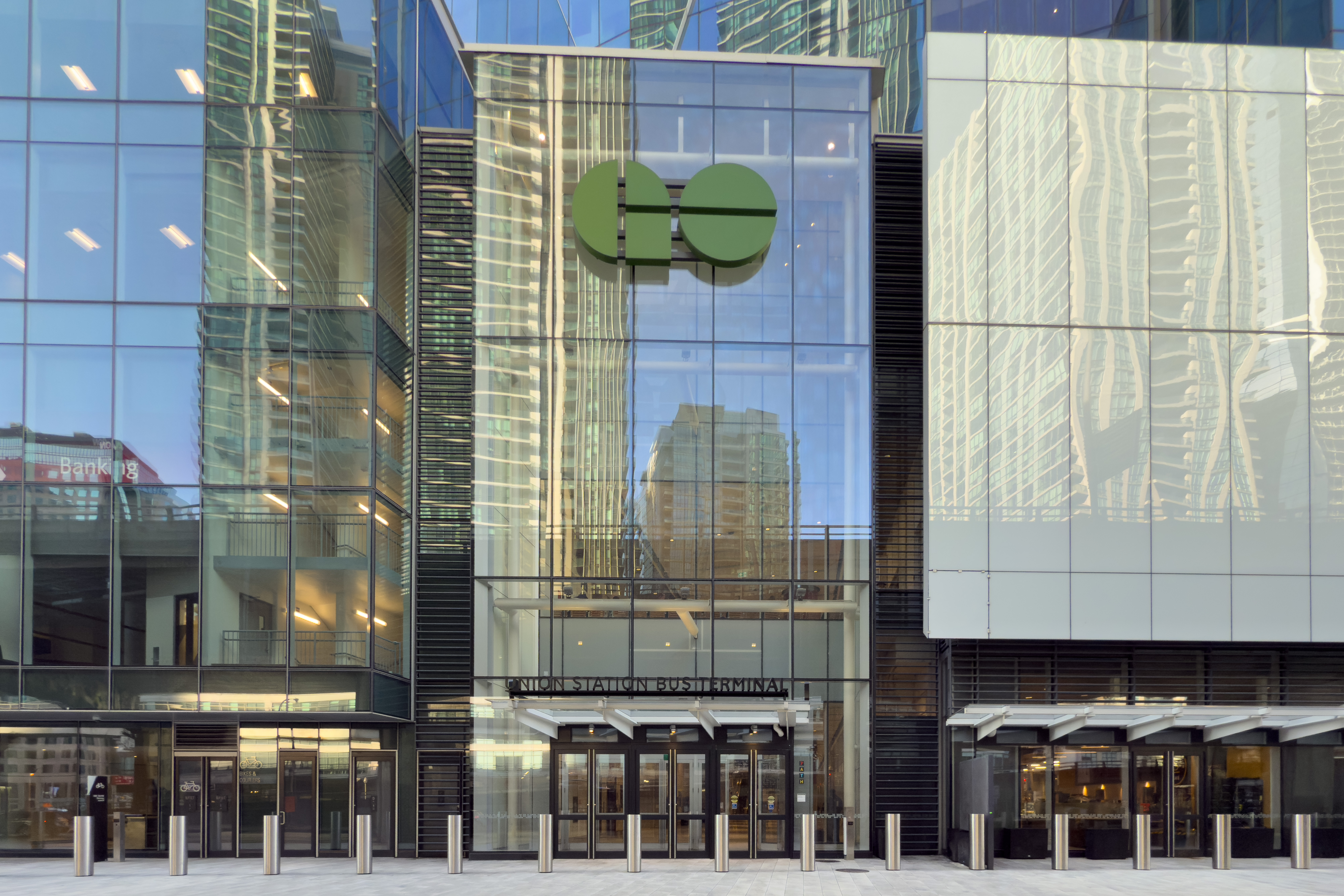
- Entrance of the bus terminal, facing Lakeshore Boulevard

General information
- Location: CIBC Square; 81 Bay Street, Toronto, Ontario; Canada
- Coordinates: 43.643977°N 79.377442°W
- Owner: Metrolinx
- Platforms: 14 bus bays
- Bus operators: GO Transit; FlixBus; Megabus; Ontario Northland; Greyhound Lines; New York Trailways; Rider Express
- Connections: at Union Station; at Union (TTC)

Construction
- Platform levels: 2
- Cycle facilities: Yes
- Accessible: Yes

Other information
- Station code: GO Transit: 02300
- Fare zone: 02

History
- Opened: December 5, 2020
Location

The Union Station Bus Terminal is the central intercity bus terminal in Toronto, Ontario, Canada. It is located in Downtown Toronto on the second floor of the south tower of CIBC Square, on the northeast corner of Bay Street and Lake Shore Boulevard. The terminal currently serves GO Transit regional buses as well as Coach Canada, Greyhound Lines and Ontario Northland long-distance bus services, among others. Owned by the provincial Crown agency Metrolinx, the terminal is connected by pedestrian walkways to the adjacent Union Station, Canada's busiest transportation hub.

The terminal opened on December 5, 2020, replacing both an outdoor terminal that was located on the north side of the rail corridor and the Toronto Coach Terminal.

== History ==
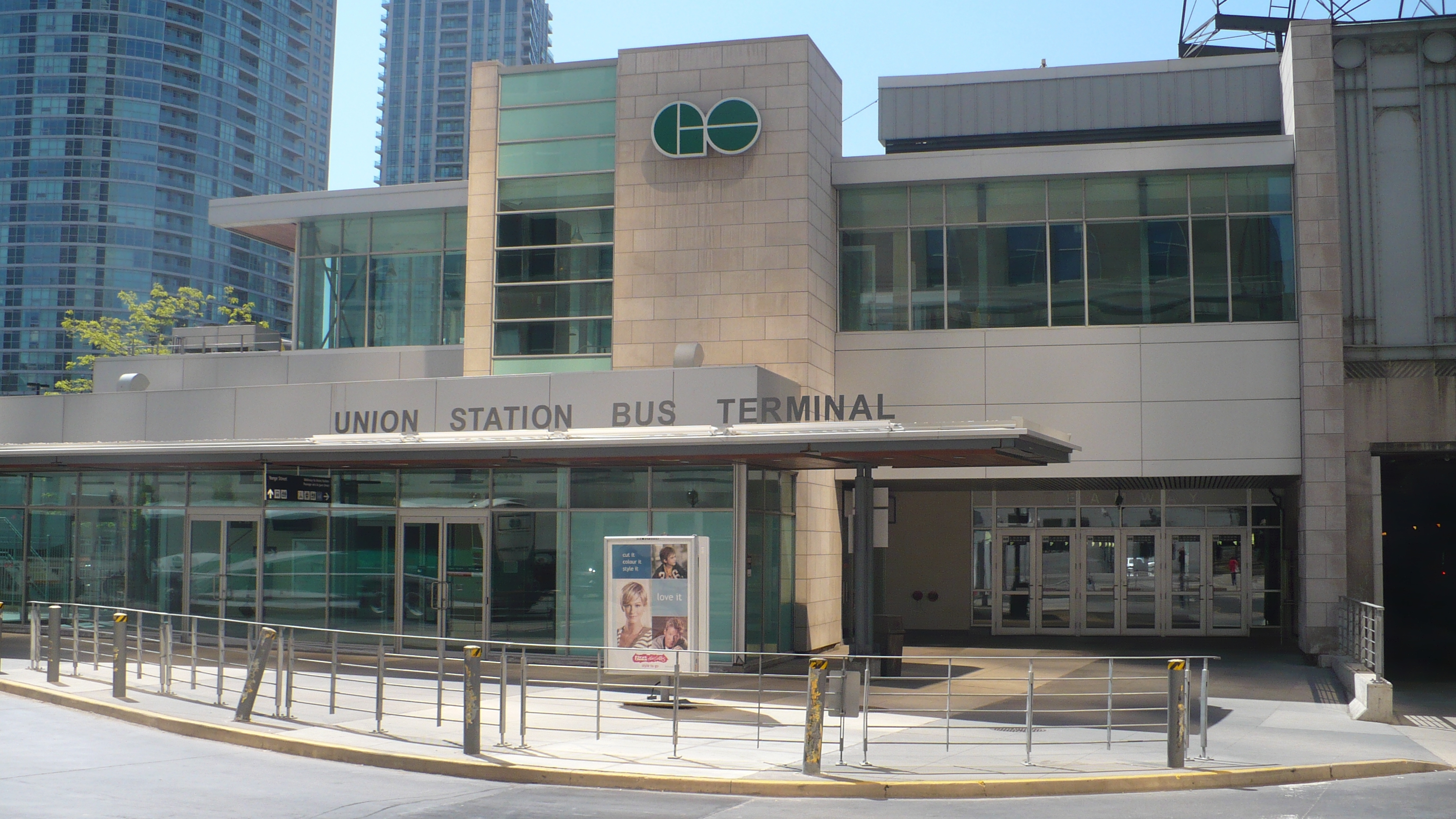
Entrance of the former Union Station bus terminal at 141 Bay Street (2003–2020)

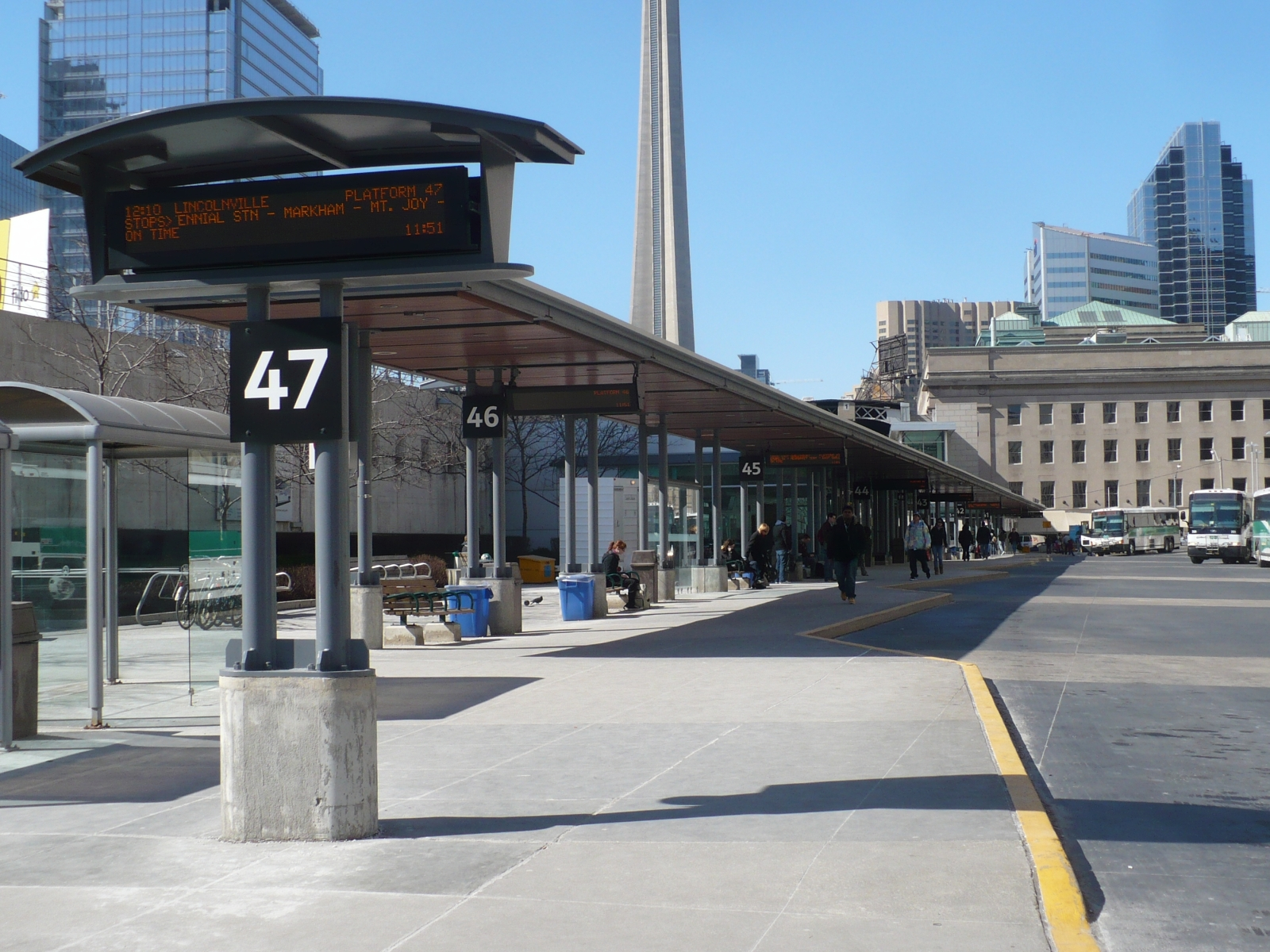
Platforms at the former Union Station bus terminal (now demolished)

=== Previous terminals ===
From the 1970s to the 1990s, the Toronto hub for GO Transit bus services was the Elizabeth Street annex to the Toronto Coach Terminal at Bay and Dundas Streets, with some routes also stopping curb-side at the Union Station train terminal, or the Royal York Hotel opposite it, from the inception of the GO Bus service on September 8, 1970. After most operations moved out of that terminal in the mid-1990s, GO buses used a curb-side facility on Front Street in front of the railway station that could hold up to seven buses. However, taxis, delivery trucks and other private vehicles would compete for space in the area reserved for buses. GO staff had to organize lines of waiting passengers so as not to obstruct the sidewalk in front of the station.

==== 2003 GO bus terminal ====
Given the traffic congestion and subsequent delays to service, a dedicated bus terminal close to Union Station was required. In 2003, GO Transit officially opened a dedicated Union Station bus terminal at 141 Bay Street at a cost of $9 million on December 5. The terminal unofficially commenced service the Labour Day weekend in 2002, when GO's Hamilton Express service, which was the last GO route still using the Elizabeth Street Terminal, relocated to Union. Non-GO intercity bus operators such as Greyhound and Coach Canada continued to operate out of the Toronto Coach Terminal.

The terminal was built on the site of a small passenger depot and a former CP Express & Transport building. Most of the old structure was demolished, with a dock door retained and its limestone fascia stored for future use.

The bus terminal was located on the east side of Bay Street directly across from the railway terminal, behind and south of the Dominion Public Building on Front Street, with an enclosed walkway above Bay Street directly connecting the terminal to the railway station concourse. There was also direct stairway access from the bus terminal to railway platforms 4 through 13 via the Bay East Teamway under the railway tracks.

The terminal had 7 platforms with fixed platform assignments. Every GO bus route departed from the same platform, a practice that would result in backlogs and delays. Due to height restrictions on the approaches to the terminal, all buses that served the terminal were single-decker buses or special low-height double-decker buses. Per weekday, the bus terminal hosted 485 bus trips and served 13,600 riders. According to Metrolinx, it was estimated more than 100 million customers had used the terminal while it was in operation.

The bus terminal's last day of service was December 4, 2020, when it relocated to its current location under CIBC Square. The 2003 terminal was demolished shortly after.

==== Relocation of operators from Toronto Coach Terminal ====
The terminal took over as Toronto's principal hub for intercity bus services from the Toronto Coach Terminal at Bay and Edward Street, two kilometres (1.2 mi) away. Negotiations with intercity coach services first began in 2012, when the relocation of the Union Station Bus Terminal to the future CIBC Square was being planned. Intercity bus operators stated that they were in favour of moving from the Toronto Coach Terminal, as a location closer to the Gardiner Expressway would reduce journey times. The Toronto Coach Terminal was leased by intercity bus operators from the Toronto Transit Commission (TTC) until July 7, 2021. Coach Canada / Megabus relocated to the new terminal on June 8, 2021. The Toronto Coach Terminal's last remaining tenant, Ontario Northland Motor Coach Services, transferred its operations to the Union Station Bus Terminal effective July 4, 2021.

Greyhound Canada never moved to the Union Station terminal as it permanently ceased operations in May 2021. US-based Greyhound Lines began cross-border Toronto–Buffalo routes in November 2021, after COVID-19 pandemic–related Canada–United States border restrictions were relaxed.

The TTC declared the Toronto Coach Terminal site surplus effective July 8, 2021, and transferred ownership of it to the City of Toronto for redevelopment.

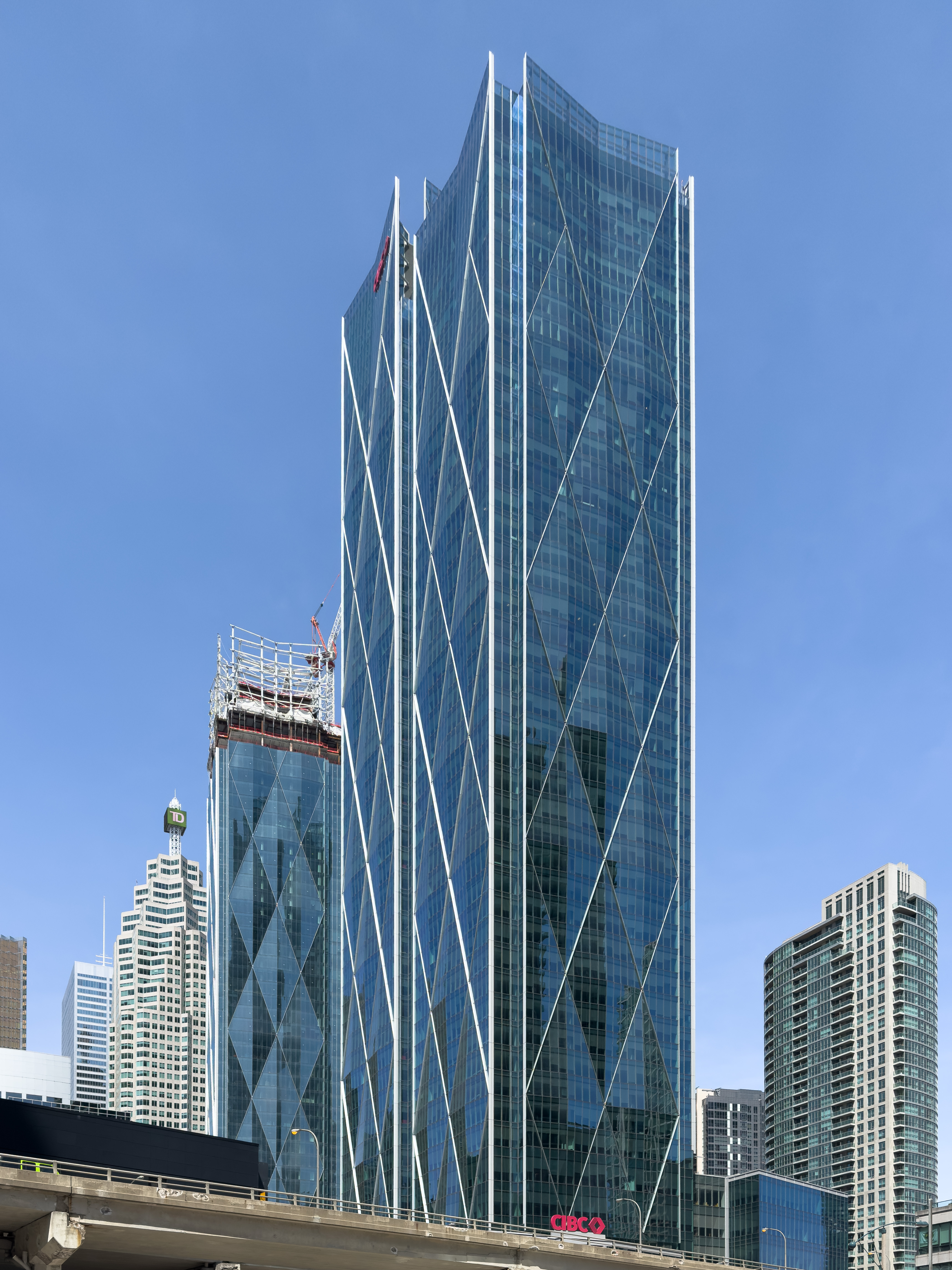
CIBC Square from Harbour Street

=== Planning, construction and opening ===
In 2007, the Greater Toronto Transportation Authority (today's Metrolinx) recommended relocating the outdated Toronto Coach Terminal and the Union Station bus terminal into one integrated bus terminal. Planning work continued over the next few years, with Metrolinx stating in 2012 that they were "contemplating building a new bus terminal at 45 Bay St." Intercity bus operators were in favour of moving from the Toronto Coach Terminal, as a location closer to the Gardiner Expressway would reduce journey times.

In 2014, Metrolinx announced plans to move the Union Station Bus Terminal to the south tower of the then-proposed Bay Park Centre, located at the northeast corner of Bay Street and Lake Shore Boulevard. Bay Park Centre was later renamed CIBC Square when the Canadian Imperial Bank of Commerce (CIBC) became the lead tenant.

As part of the deal for the new terminal, Metrolinx sold the site of the old bus terminal at 141 Bay Street to Ivanhoé Cambridge and, in exchange, acquired a 99-year lease for the new terminal. Construction on the new terminal began in 2017 and opened in 2020. The terminal was developed through a partnership between Metrolinx and real estate firms Ivanhoé Cambridge and Hines. The architects for CIBC Square were WilkinsonEyre and Adamson Associates.

As part of the construction of the new terminal, the East Bay Teamway was closed temporarily. It gave direct access to GO trains on tracks 4 to 13 and provided a convenient way for riders to transfer between GO trains and GO buses at the old bus terminal. Once reopened, the East Bay Teamway will connect the new bus terminal to a future commercial development at the site of the old terminal. By mid-2020, the new bus terminal was complete, and being tested for public use.

The terminal opened on December 5, 2020. In late May 2021, the East Bay Teamway reopened, providing a direct indoor connection between the new bus terminal and GO Transit rail services on tracks 4 to 13.

The streets surrounding the terminal do not have dedicated bus lanes. Since 2021, congestion on these streets has caused buses to be delayed and diverted away from the bus terminal. In 2023, a GO bus route was withdrawn due to this congestion. Politicians and transit advocates have called for bus lanes and dedicated turning lanes to be installed on streets around the terminal, such as on Lake Shore Boulevard.

== Location and features ==
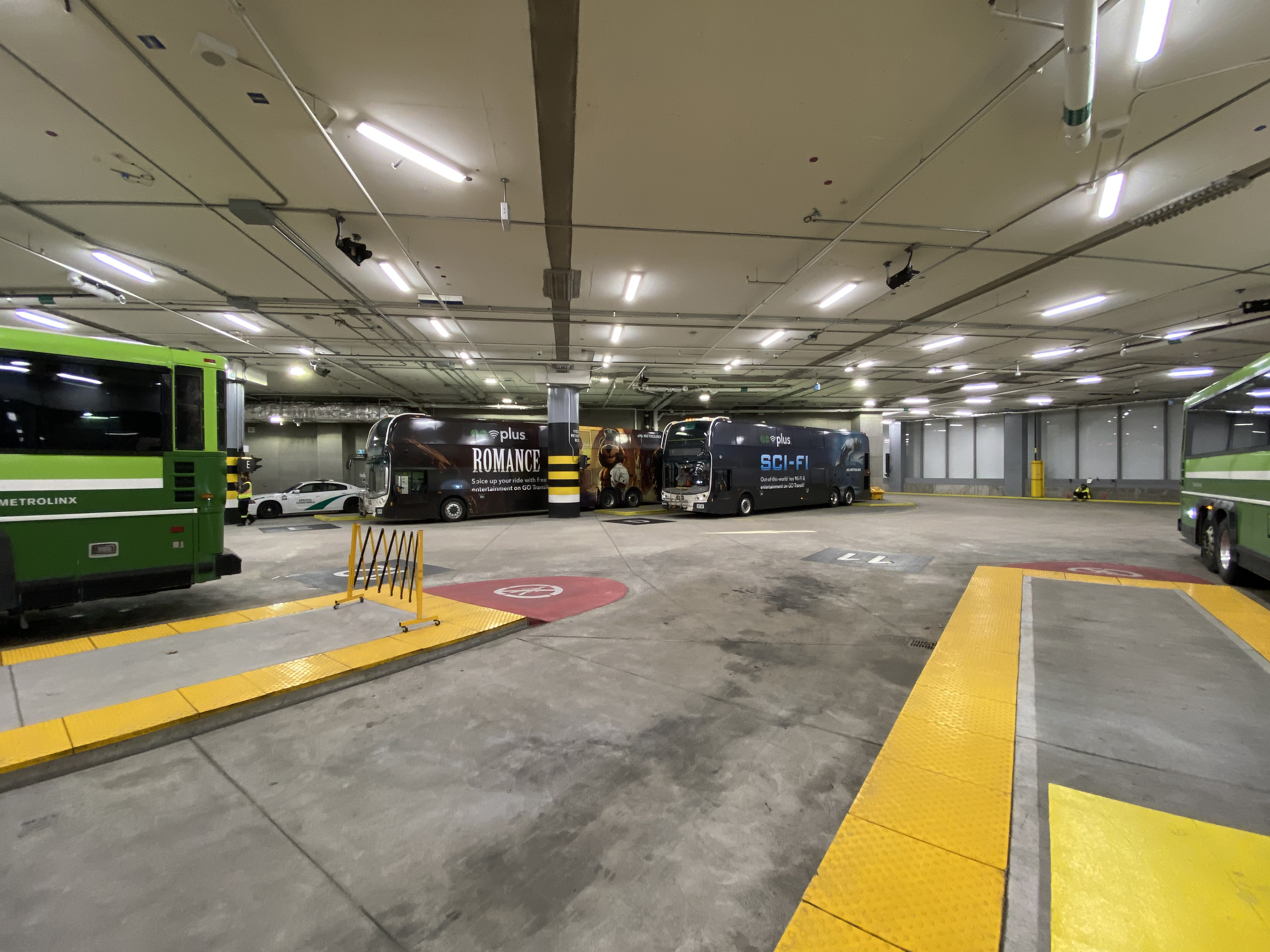
Bus terminal drop-off area

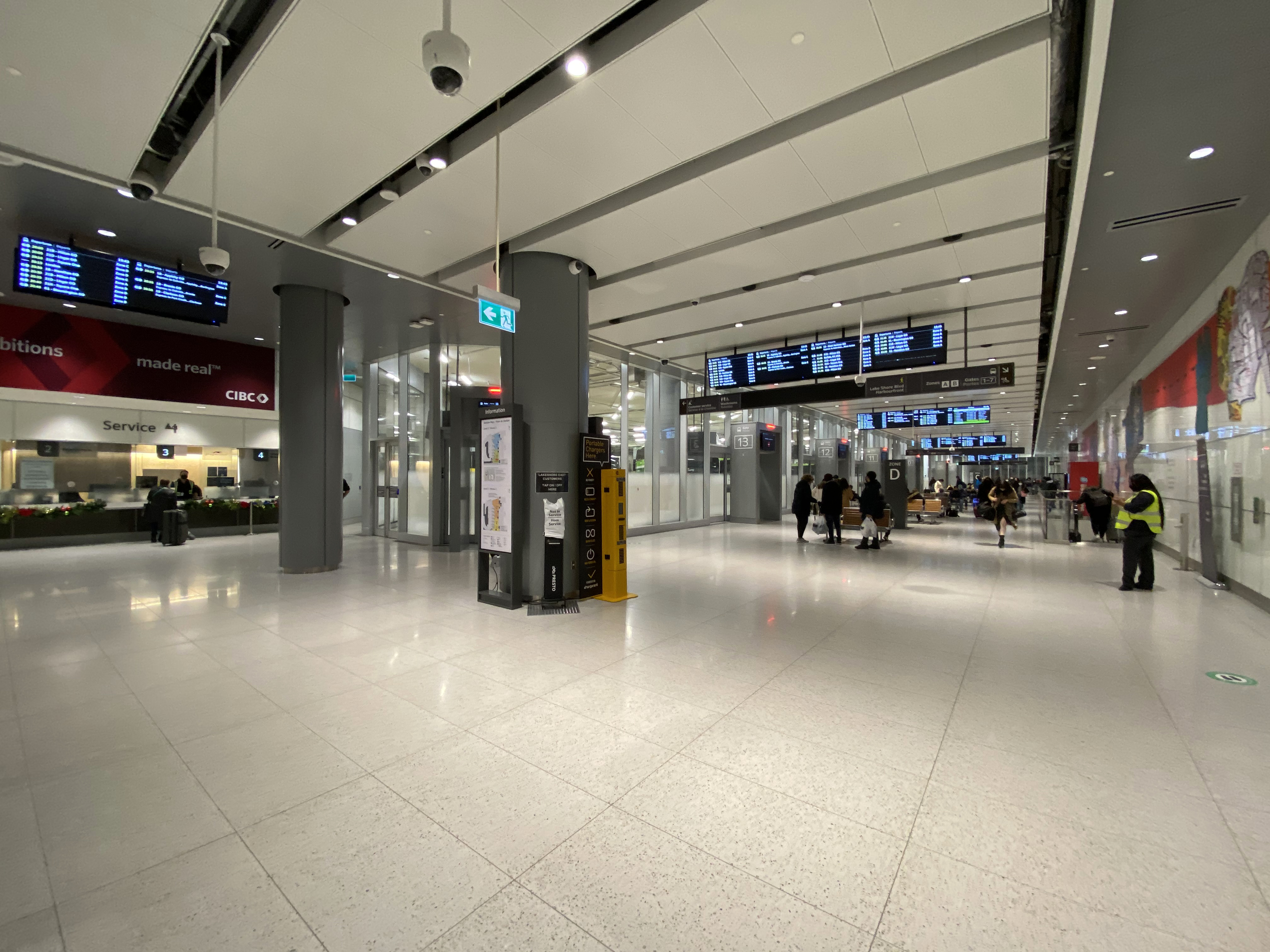
Upper level interior

The bus terminal is located at 81 Bay Street, northwest of Lake Shore Boulevard and southeast of Union Station, on the south side of the Union Station Rail Corridor. The terminal is housed within the 48-storey south tower of the CIBC Square office development and is directly connected to Union Station via Scotiabank Arena (accessed by an enclosed pedestrian bridge over Bay Street, which is part of the city's Path indoor pedestrian network), which lies adjacent to Union Station itself.

There are two street-level entrances, one on Bay Street opposite Scotiabank Arena, and the other on Lake Shore Boulevard just east of Bay Street. There is a pickup and dropoff area and bicycle parking on the P1 level.

The terminal's bus platforms and waiting areas occupy two floors within CIBC Square. The terminal area is climate controlled, with glass doors separating the waiting area from the bus platforms. Other facilities include free Wi-Fi, charging points and washrooms. The terminal is also fully accessible, with elevators, braille and help points throughout the terminal.

Boarding procedures are similar to those for an airport terminal. Digital screens direct riders to the appropriate zone to wait for boarding. Gate assignments appear on digital screens 10 minutes before bus departure, followed by an audio announcement on the PA system. Glass gate doors separating the waiting area from the platform open only when buses are ready to load passengers.

The 10,000 m^{2} (110,000 sq ft), bi-level terminal has fourteen bus bays – twice as many as the previous terminal – and can accommodate GO Transit's fleet of double-decker buses. Unlike the old terminal, bus routes are not permanently assigned platforms in the terminal; this allows for reduced delays in bus unloading and departures. For safety and to prevent unauthorized access, passengers are allowed on the platforms only when buses are loading or unloading.

A Second Cup cafe is located on the first floor of the terminal.

== Services ==
Union Station Bus Terminal provides regional and long-distance bus services. As of 2023, seven carriers were using the terminal: GO Transit, Ontario Northland, FlixBus, Greyhound USA, Megabus/Coach Canada, Red Arrow and Rider Express, with GO Transit accounting for approximately 60% of trips arriving or departing from the station.

=== GO Transit ===
GO Transit provides bus routes connecting to various cities and towns across the Greater Toronto and Hamilton Area. One bus route, 16 Hamilton/Toronto Express, runs between Union Station Bus Terminal and Hamilton GO Centre in both directions throughout the day. All other GO Transit bus routes complement a namesake GO rail line, providing transit service in directions or periods when GO trains do not run.

GO buses serve the following routes and rail corridors:

- 16 Hamilton/Toronto Express
- 18 Lakeshore West
- 21 Milton
- 31 Kitchener
- 61 Richmond Hill
- 65 Barrie
- 71 Stouffville
- 90 Lakeshore East

=== Long distance ===
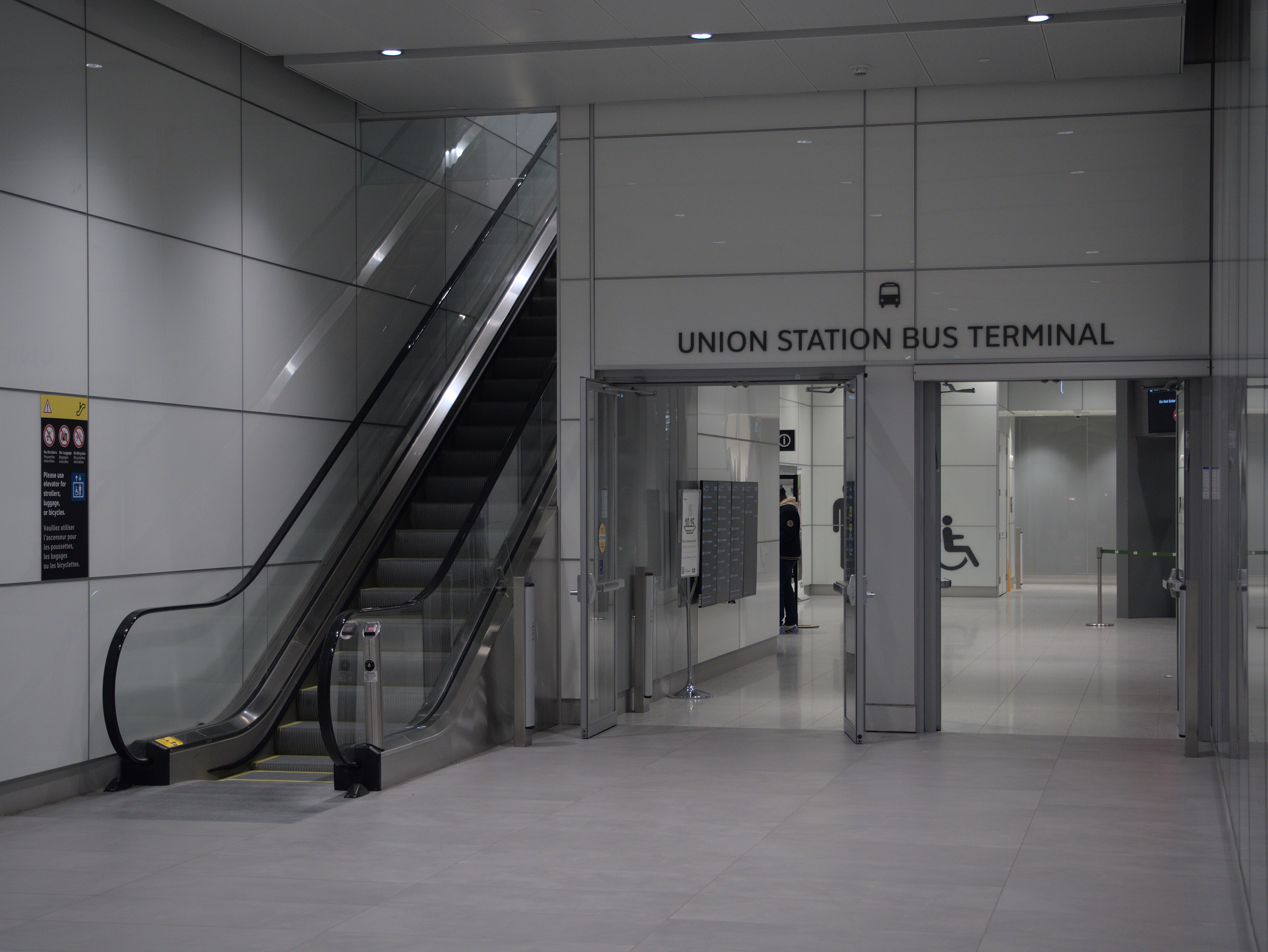
The entrance to the bus terminal as seen approaching from inside Scotiabank Arena

Bus company	Main destinations
FlixBus	Hamilton; Brantford; London; Hamilton; Brantford; Woodstock; Ingersoll; London; Hamilton; Brantford; London; St. Thomas; Hamilton; London; Chatham-Kent; Windsor; Detroit; Kitchener; London; Strathroy; Sarnia; Port Hope; Cobourg; Belleville; Kingston; Ottawa; Whitby; Peterborough; Madoc; Perth; Carleton Place; Kanata; Ottawa; St. Catharines; Niagara Falls, Ontario; St. Catharines; Niagara Falls, Ontario; Niagara Falls, New York; Buffalo; Buffalo Niagara International Airport; Niagara Falls, Ontario; Niagara Falls, New York; Buffalo; Buffalo Niagara International Airport; Rochester; Ithaca; Binghamton; Scranton; New York City; Barrie; Waubaushene; Port Severn; Parry Sound; Sudbury; Barrie; Orillia; Gravenhurst; Bracebridge; Huntsville; South River; North Bay; Toronto Pearson International Airport; Barrie; Wasaga Beach; Collingwood; Thornbury; Meaford; Owen Sound
Greyhound Lines	Buffalo; Batavia; Rochester; Syracuse; Cortland; Binghamton; Gouldsboro; New York City
Megabus	St. Catharines; Niagara Falls, Ontario; London; Kingston (connection to Ottawa); Brockville; Cornwall; Kirkland; Montreal
New York Trailways	Niagara Falls, Ontario; Buffalo; Batavia; Rochester; Syracuse; Cortland; Binghamton; Newark; New York City
Ontario Northland	Barrie; Bracebridge; Huntsville; North Bay; Barrie; Parry Sound; Sudbury
Rider Express	Belleville; Kingston; Ottawa; Peterborough; Marmora; Madoc; Perth; Carleton Place; Kanata; Ottawa

== Connections ==
The bus terminal is connected to Union Station by pedestrian walkways, providing access to connecting suburban and long-distance train services by GO Transit, Via Rail and Amtrak. Union Pearson Express connects the terminal to Toronto Pearson International Airport. The Bay East Teamway provides a direct indoor connection to tracks 4 to 13 used by GO Transit rail services.

The terminal is also connected to the TTC subway and streetcar system at Union subway station – served by subway Line 1 Yonge–University and streetcar routes 509 Harbourfront and 510 Spadina. Toronto Transit Commission bus routes 19 Bay, 72 Pape and 121 Fort York–Esplanade also connect to Union Station at bus stops at the intersection of Front and Bay Streets.

Porter Airlines operates a shuttle bus service to Billy Bishop Toronto City Airport from the intersection of Front and York Streets, northwest of Union Station.
