= Gray Coach =

Former Canadian commercial intercity bus company

- Parent: Toronto Transportation Commission 1927–1954; Municipality of Metropolitan Toronto (Toronto Transit Commission) 1954–1990; Stagecoach 1990–1992
- Founded: 1927
- Defunct: 1992
- Headquarters: Toronto
- Locale: Ontario
- Service area: Southern & Central Ontario
- Service type: intercity, commuter, local sightseeing
- Alliance: Voyageur to Ottawa and Montreal; Greyhound to New York City
- Destinations: Toronto, Sudbury, North Bay, Barrie, Owen Sound, London, Kitchener, Guelph, Hamilton, Niagara Falls, Buffalo, New York
- Stations: Toronto Bus Terminal; Sunnyside Bus Terminal
- Depots: Davenport Garage 1927-1954; Sherbourne Garage 1954-1980; Lakeshore Garage 1980-1990

Gray Coach was a Canadian inter-city bus line based in Toronto, Ontario, from 1927 to 1992. It was founded and initially owned by the Toronto Transportation Commission, until sold to Stagecoach in 1990. In 1992 the business was sold to Greyhound Canada and the brand was retired.

== Overview and history ==
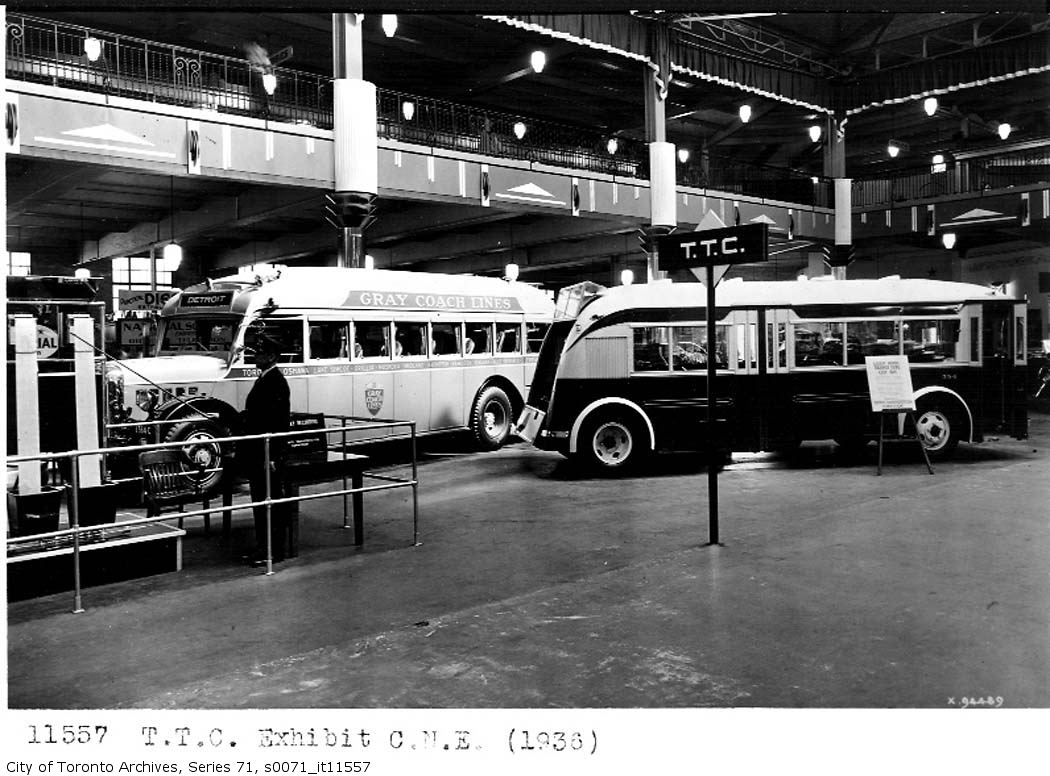
Gray Coach Lines bus (left) and TTC bus (right), 1936

Gray Coach Lines was a suburban bus and sightseeing tour operator founded in 1927 by the Toronto Transportation Commission (TTC). From 1927 to the 1930s, Gray Coach acquired numerous and smaller competitors in the Greater Toronto Area. The operator eventually dominated inter-urban bus service by the end of the 1930s, replacing or succeeding many Toronto and area interurban radial lines that had previously provided interurban transportation by light rail.

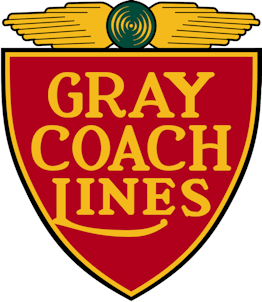
Gray Coach Lines shield, used until 1972

Gray Coach used inter-urban coaches to link Toronto to outlying areas throughout Southern Ontario, such as Owen Sound, London, Kitchener, Guelph, Niagara Falls, Sudbury, North Bay, Barrie and Hamilton. Gray Coach also offered service to Buffalo, New York and in a pooling agreement with Greyhound, to New York City. In addition, Gray Coach operated sightseeing tour service in and around Toronto, eventually in association with Gray Line tours. Gray Coach Lines also provided one-hour Motor Launch Tours of the lagoons off Toronto's harbour and of the waterfront (used Amsterdam canal style boats with large glass top now run by Toronto Harbour Tours). The main bus terminal was at the Toronto Bus Terminal on Elizabeth Street, downtown. A secondary terminal for parcel service was operated at the corner of Front and Sherbourne Streets and a secondary bus terminal, the Sunnyside Bus Terminal was located at Queen Street West and Roncesvalles in Toronto's west end.

Gray Coach was contracted to operate some GO Transit bus services when the latter was started in 1971. Eventually GO Transit took over some Gray Coach routes were, including the Hamilton, Oshawa and Port Perry runs. The contracting for GO Transit ended in 1985, when GO began to completely operate its own buses.

By the 1980s, Gray Coach faced fierce competition in the Greater Toronto Area. To strengthen its position, Gray Coach bid to acquire inter-urban operator Trentway-Wagar. However, facing budgetary pressure, the TTC decided to focus on its core urban transit service. In October 1990 the TTC sold Gray Coach Lines to Stagecoach who then sold it to Greyhound Canada and Ontario Northland Motor Coach Services in 1992. Gray Coach's Gray Line franchised sightseeing operations were taken over by Greyhound Canada.

== Livery ==
Livery of early buses were gray with the red crest with the words Gray Coach Lines. The crest disappeared and replaced with the full wording with blue strip. The final buses had a white base with black letters GC. A red stripe was added along the belt line on sightseeing, Airport Express, and Hostess Express premium-service buses.

== Stops ==
Gray Coach had terminals and agencies at various locations across Toronto:

Facility details
Terminal/Stop
Location
Notes
(Metro) Toronto Coach Terminal
Dundas Street West and Elizabeth Street

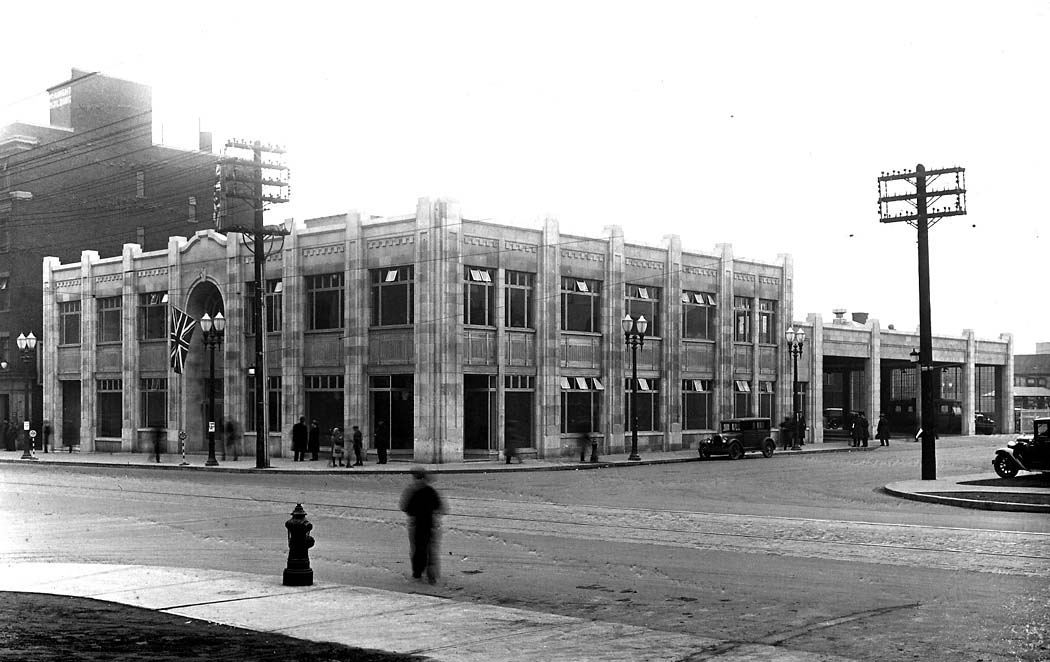

Subsequently used by Coach Canada and Ontario Northland. Decommissioned in 2021.

Toronto Pearson International Airport
Terminal 1 (former) and 2 - Arrival and Departure levels
Served by TTC and other private charters at Terminal 1 (new) and 3; formerly served terminal 2
Downtown hotels
N/A
Continued as Pacific Western Bus Line's Toronto Airport Express until 2014.
Islington subway station
Islington Avenue and Bloor Street West
No longer in use; TTC Airport Rocket Route 192 operating out of Kipling Station
Yorkdale Bus Terminal
Yorkdale Shopping Centre
Now used by GO Transit and Ontario Northland Motor Coach Services; served by Pacific Western Bus Line's Toronto Airport Express from 1993 until 2000.
York Mills subway station
York Mills Road and Yonge Street - old bus platforms
terminal demolished and replaced by GO Transit terminal within York Mills Centre; served by Pacific Western Bus Line's Toronto Airport Express from 1993 until 2000.
Jane Loop
Jane Street and Bloor Street West
Demolished, office building stands on site
Glen Echo Terminal
(North Yonge)
Glen Echo Road and Yonge Street
abandoned upon opening of York Mills, demolished now a Loblaws supermarket
Finch Bus Terminal
Yonge Street and Bishop Avenue
Now serving GO Transit, Viva, York Region Transit and Brampton Transit; private charters
Sunnyside Bus Terminal
Queen Street West, Roncesvalles Avenue, King Street West, and The Queensway
West Toronto (Roncesvalles) Pick-up and drop off location at corner of Roncesvalles Carhouse, now a McDonald's

== City routes ==
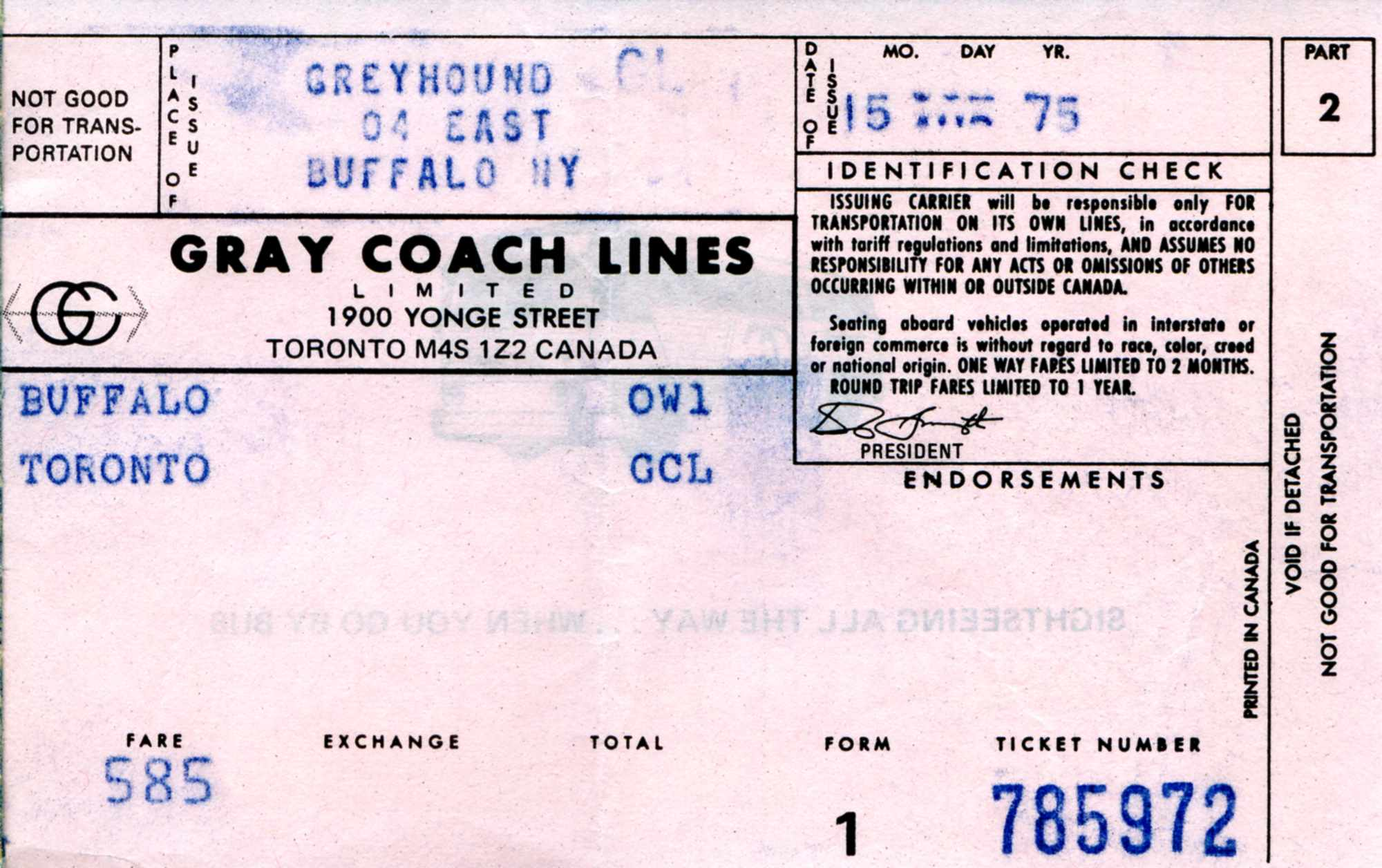
Gray Coach Lines bus ticket from 1975

Gray Coach once operated a number of suburban and extra-fare express routes in Toronto.

=== Beach Coach ===
Operated from 1947 to 1952 between downtown and the Beaches via Eastern Avenue and Queen Street East.

=== Hill Coach ===
The first city coach route started running in 1925, between Forest Hill and downtown via Forest Hill Road, Poplar Plains Road, Dupont Street, St George Street, University Avenue, Osgoode and Albert Streets. In 1931 it was extended north to Glenview Avenue (later Otter Loop). Service was withdrawn in September 1954 due to opening of the new Yonge subway.

=== Islington ===
In April 1929 Gray Coach Lines acquired Maple Leaf Coach Lines. MCL's ISLINGTON route (via Dundas Street from Runnymede Road to Bloor Street in the town of Islington—now Six Points) was combined with the LAMBTON route and transferred to the TTC. It was transferred to Gray Coach circa 1930. As of 1 January 1954 it was included in the new Metropolitan Toronto operation, and Gray Coaches were replaced by "red" city buses.

=== Kingsway Coach ===
Inaugurated in November 1945 between Bloor Street & Royal York Road and downtown via (South) Kingsway, Lake Shore Drive, Dowling Avenue and King Street, with an early and late extension to Burnhamthorpe & Holloway Roads via Bloor, Islington and Canning. Withdrawn in April 1946 after only five months of (presumably unsuccessful) operation.

=== Lambton ===
From Keele Street to Humber (Lambton Hotel) along Dundas Street. Operated initially by the TTC for York Township, it was transferred to Gray Coach circa 1930. As of 1 January 1954 it was included in the new Metropolitan Toronto operation, and Gray Coaches were replaced by "red" city buses.

=== Leaside ===
From 1 May 1953 to 1 January 1954 the LEASIDE bus was operated by Gray Coach Lines.

=== Rosedale Coach ===
The ROSEDALE coach ran for just under two years (November 1928 to September 1930) between Summerhill & MacLennan Avenues and downtown via Glen Road, Sherbourne Street, Isabella Street, Jarvis Street and Shuter Street to Yonge Street.

=== Woodbridge ===
Gray Coach acquired the WOODBRIDGE route when the TTC bought out Roseland Bus Lines. From Lawrence and Weston via Weston Road, Albion Road, Thistletown, Woodbridge Road, Highway 7, 8th Avenue and Pine Street (Woodbridge Avenue) to Pine Grove Road, Woodbridge, with Sunday trips operating through the Thistletown Hospital (For Disturbed Children) grounds. The route was transferred to the TTC in December 1955 as Islington Bus (as 44 Islington 1956 to 1963 and now as 37 Islington).

== Other Interurban Operators ==
A list of independent operators acquired by Gray Coach:

- Danforth Bus Lines - East York
- Hollinger Bus Lines - East York
- Roseland Bus Lines - Weston, Ontario
- West York Coach Lines - York, Ontario
- Maple Leaf Coach Lines - Islington, Ontario

== See also ==
- Toronto Transportation Commission
- Toronto Transit Commission
- Greyhound Canada - took over Gray Coach routes
- GO Transit bus services - public interurban bus service in and around the Greater Toronto Area - includes several former Gray Coach routes
- Ontario Northland Motor Coach Services - public interurban service in northern Ontario and between northern Ontario and Toronto and Ottawa
- Toronto Airport Express - which succeeded Gray Coach's Airport Express
- Gray Line Worldwide -unrelated US Tour operator
