= Toronto Coach Terminal =

Decommissioned bus terminal

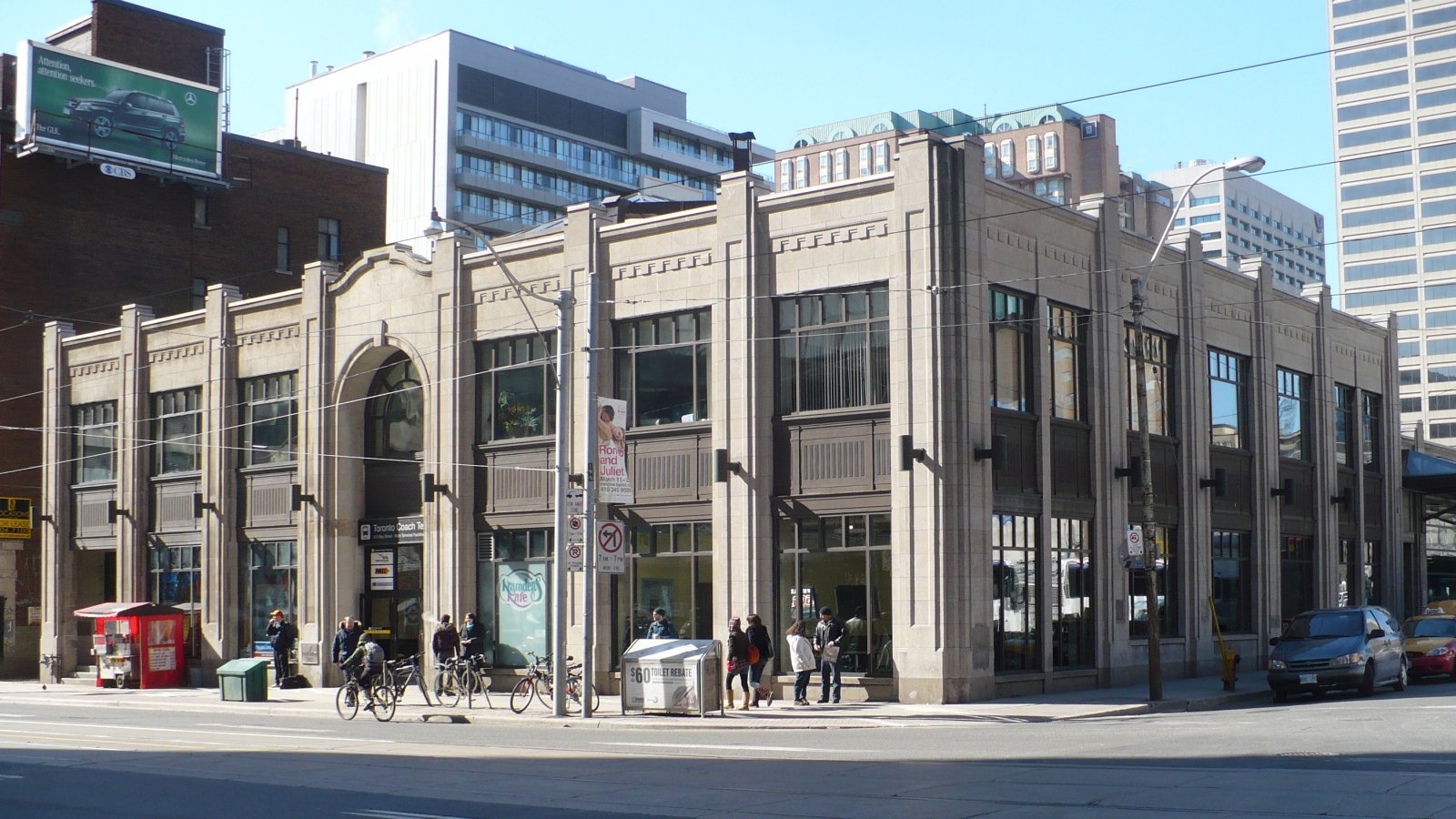

General information
- Location: 610 Bay Street (main terminal); 130 Elizabeth Street (annex); Toronto, Ontario; Canada
- Coordinates: 43°39′22″N 79°23′03″W
- Owner: Toronto Coach Terminal Inc. (Toronto Transit Commission) Ownership transferred to City of Toronto in 2021
- Bus stands: 14 bays (2 per platform, main terminal), 5 bays (Elizabeth Street Terminal)
- Bus operators: Gray Coach, GO Transit, Voyageur Colonial, Greyhound, PMCL, Pacific Western, Can-Ar Coach Service, Travelways, Trailways of New York, Danforth Bus Lines/ Toronto Coach Lines, Hollinger, Collacutt, Ontario Northland
- Connections: TMU subway station 505 Dundas streetcar 19 Bay

Construction
- Parking: No
- Cycle facilities: No
- Accessible: Yes
- Architect: Charles B. Dolphin
- Architectural style: Art Deco

History
- Opened: December 19, 1931
- Closed: July 3, 2021
- Rebuilt: 1984 (east bus bays) / 1990 (main terminal)
- Former names: Toronto Motor Coach Terminal, Gray Coach Terminal (1930s–1990)

Key dates
- 1931: Toronto Motor Coach Terminal opens, replacing the open-air Union Coach Terminal at the same location
- 1968: Elizabeth Street Terminal opens as the annex for the main terminal
- 1990: Facility renamed the Toronto Coach Terminal
- July 3, 2021: Ontario Northland, the last remaining bus operator, ends use of terminal
- July 8, 2021: Ownership of property transferred to City of Toronto for redevelopment

Passengers
- 2012: 1,000,000+
Location
Notes
- Amenities: ticket booths, waiting room, restaurant and bar, newspaper stand, lunch counter, traveller's information kiosk, lockers

The Toronto Coach Terminal is a decommissioned bus station for intercity bus services in Toronto, Ontario, Canada. The building was the central intercity bus station in Toronto until mid-2021, when it was replaced by the Union Station Bus Terminal. It is located at 610 Bay Street, in the city's downtown. Opened in 1931 as the Gray Coach Terminal, the Art Deco style structure was the main hub for Gray Coach, an interurban coach service then owned by the Toronto Transportation Commission (later renamed the Toronto Transit Commission) (TTC). It replaced an earlier open air depot, the Union Coach Terminal.

== History ==
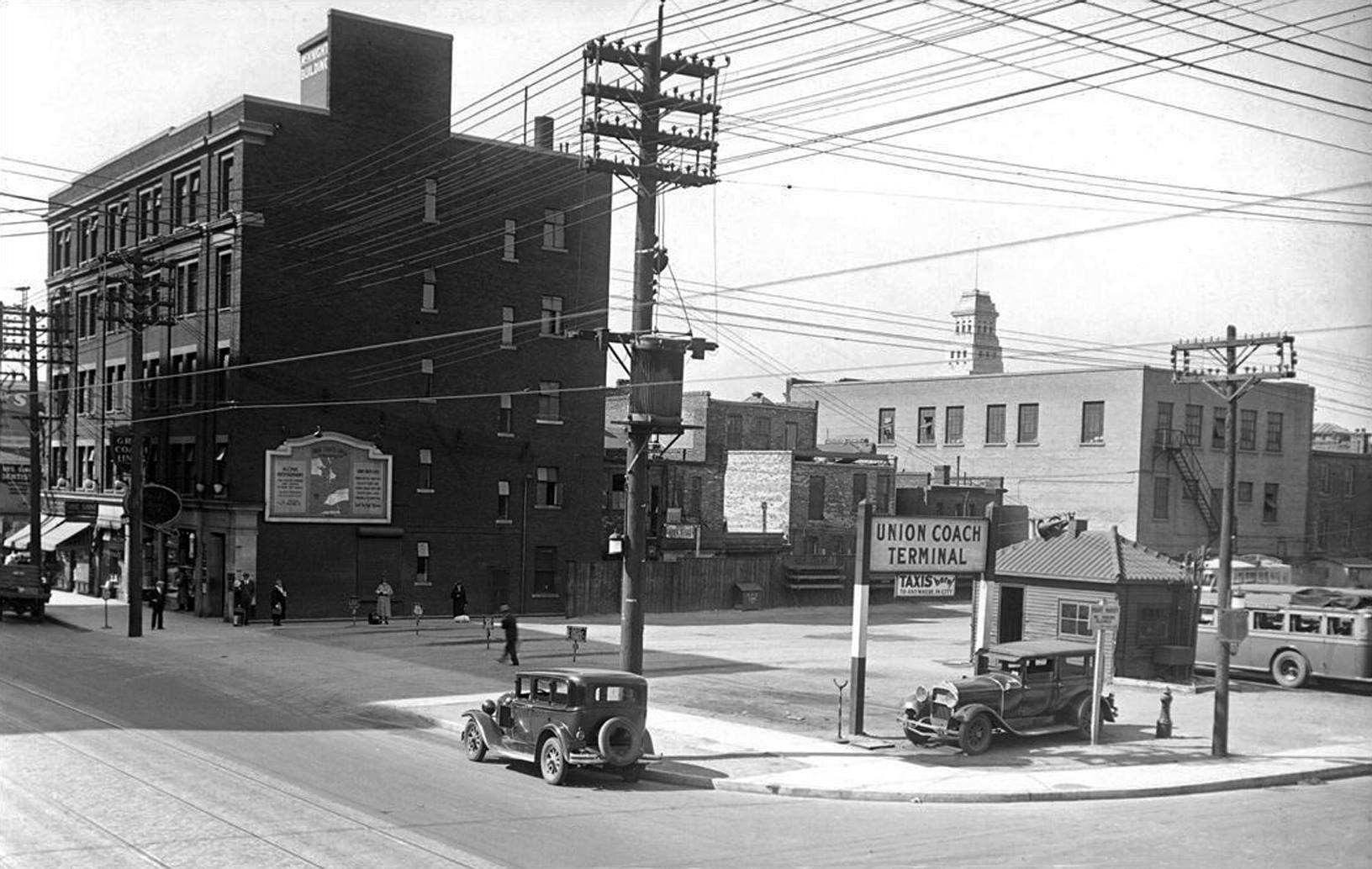
The open-air Union Coach Terminal at Bay and Edward Streets in June 1931, prior to the construction of the Gray Coach Terminal on the same site

In 1927, the TTC signed a contract with Trinity College leasing a parcel of land at Bay and Edward Streets for an open air coach terminal.

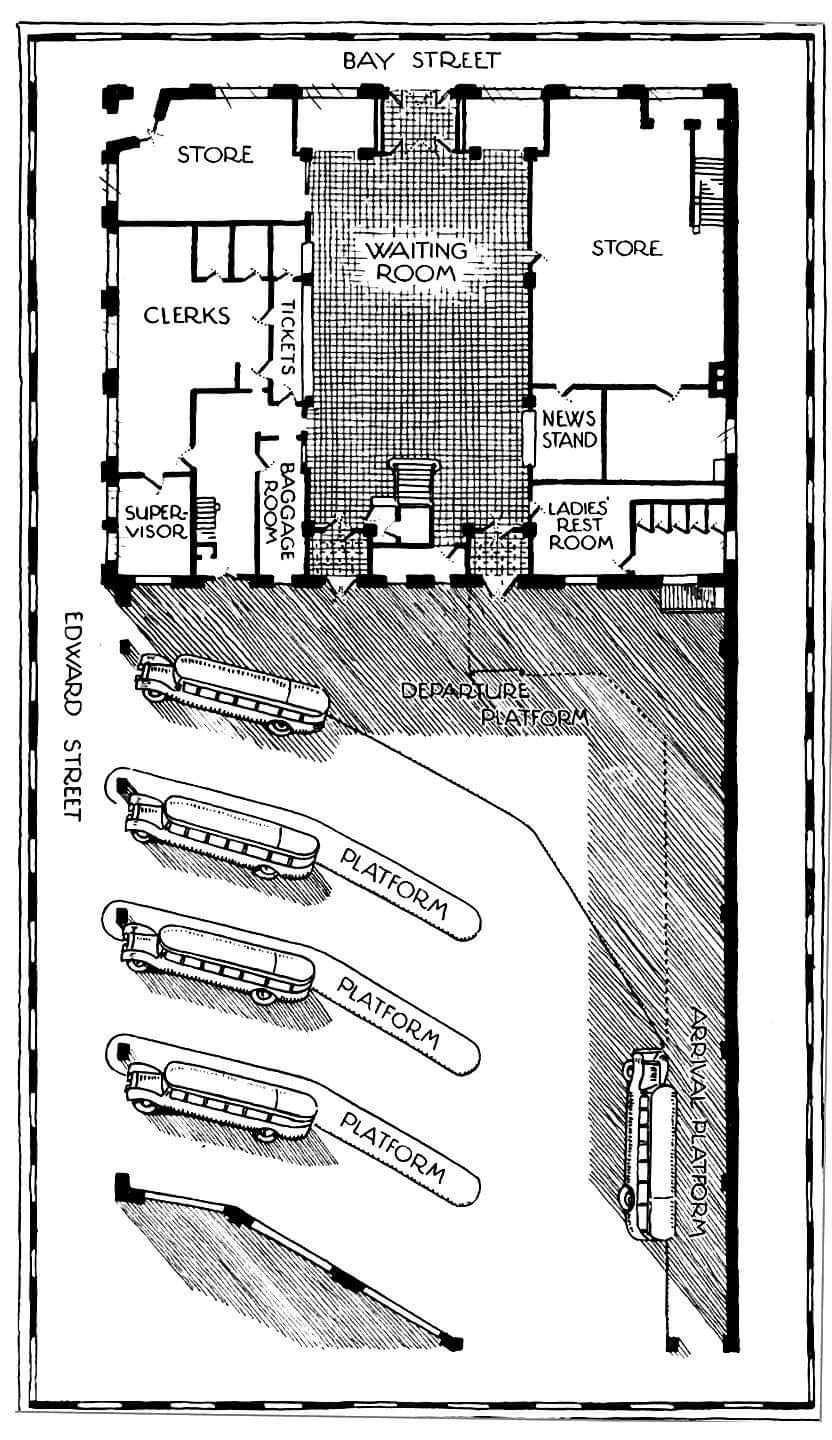
Artist's cut, layout of Toronto Motor Coach Terminal, December 1931

After purchasing the Bay/Edward property, construction on a permanent terminal building began in July 1931. The building officially opened on December 19, 1931 as the Toronto Motor Coach Terminal, to serve as the terminal hub for the Toronto Transit Commission's (TTC) Gray Coach intercity bus service, replacing an open air terminal that had operated at the same location. Known as the Gray Coach Terminal until 1990, the Art Deco building is a two-storey historic building with Travertine limestone. Designed by architect Charles B. Dolphin it was originally built with five platforms (four departure and one arrival platform) and later expanded to nine bus platforms. Its final form consisted of seven bus platforms, accommodating two numbered bus bays each. The building has been listed in the City of Toronto's heritage buildings register since May 19, 1987.

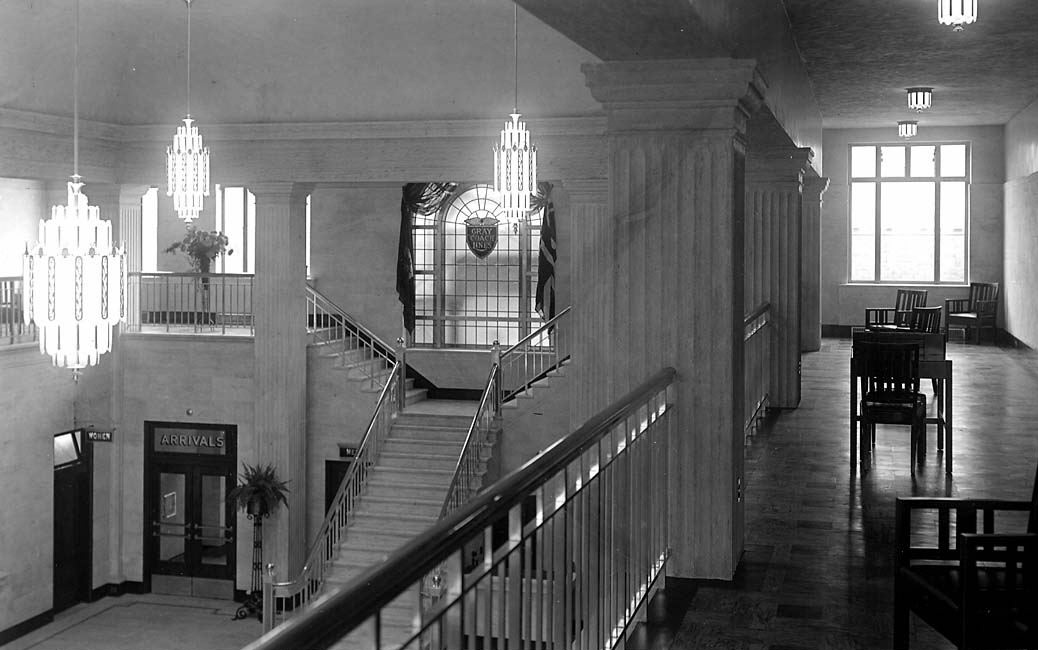
The north mezzanine of the terminal building shortly after opening in December 1931

An annex, the Elizabeth Street Terminal located at 130 Elizabeth Street, is located to the west of the main terminal. It was originally built in 1968 and was used for bus charters and sightseeing buses and, beginning in 1970, it was a hub for GO Transit bus arrivals and departures. Five diagonal bus bays on its south side were used for departures and the north side of the building opening onto a covered two-lane driveway acting as an unloading area and space for bus layovers and parking.

In 1990, the Elizabeth Street Terminal also began handling arrivals for the main terminal's bus lines with departures leaving from the main coach terminal across the street, which is rather unusual for bus terminals or other passenger transportation infrastructure.

Through the 1990s, GO Transit bus services gradually relocated to Toronto Union Station, first to seven curb-side bus stops along Front Street in front of the railway station, and then to the original Union Station Bus Terminal on Front Street, across Bay Street from the rail terminal. GO's Toronto to Hamilton Express bus route was the last to use the Elizabeth Street Terminal until Labour Day weekend of 2002 when it moved to the original Union Station Bus Terminal on Front Street. After the departure of GO Transit, the Elizabeth Street terminal only handled arrivals for the remaining bus lines.

The bus bays on the south side of the building were decommissioned and the area converted into a Green P paid parking lot. The waiting area and newsstand in the Elizabeth Street Terminal were closed in 2010 with only the bus platform on the north of the building remaining open to the public for bus arrivals. Due to limited space, buses would park overnight along Edward Street and Chestnut Street.

A renovation of the main terminal building occurred in 1990, tripled the main terminal's floor space to 2,500 square metres, creating more seating for waiting passengers (250 seats rather than 100). This was done by demolishing the interior wall separating the main building from the bus bays and replacing it with a glass wall several metres to the west, reducing the space allotted for bus bays. The bus shed was configured into seven lanes, with room for two buses in each lane. The 40-seat lunch counter-style restaurant which had been on the main floor was removed and replaced by an upstairs restaurant and bar seating 150, with railings overlooking main floor enclosed with glass. The restaurant was unable to attract enough passengers to sustain itself and the vendor instead was given space to run a snack bar on the main floor and a passenger lounge and bar in the basement, leaving the upstairs area to be converted to office space. An enclosed pedestrian walkway, with lockers lining the south wall, was built on the south side of the bus shed connecting the main terminal building with Elizabeth Street allowing passengers to walk from the main building to Elizabeth Street, and then cross the street to the Elizabeth terminal, without having to walk through the bus bays in the main terminal. The dispatch office is located along the west wall of the terminal, overlooking the bus bays.

As part of the renovation, a tunnel was built under Bay Street at the cost of CA$4 million connecting the main terminal to the Atrium on Bay and, through it, to TMU subway station as well as to the PATH network. A newspaper stand was located in the basement along with, over various years, a shoeshine stand (in earlier decades), a travellers' lounge called Kramden's Kafe (after it moved from its original location as the upstairs restaurant) serving snacks and alcohol and equipped with a pool table, and finally a bakery.

In 2012, the coach terminal's board proposed that a new facility be built at the terminal's current location combining the original terminal and the Elizabeth Street annex into one structure that could fit double the current number of bus bays. However, in September 2014 Metrolinx announced plans to relocate its GO Transit Union Station Bus Terminal to a new terminal in the then under-construction CIBC Square office development located at 81 Bay Street and move the bus lines that serviced the coach terminal there. This new terminal opened in December 2020.

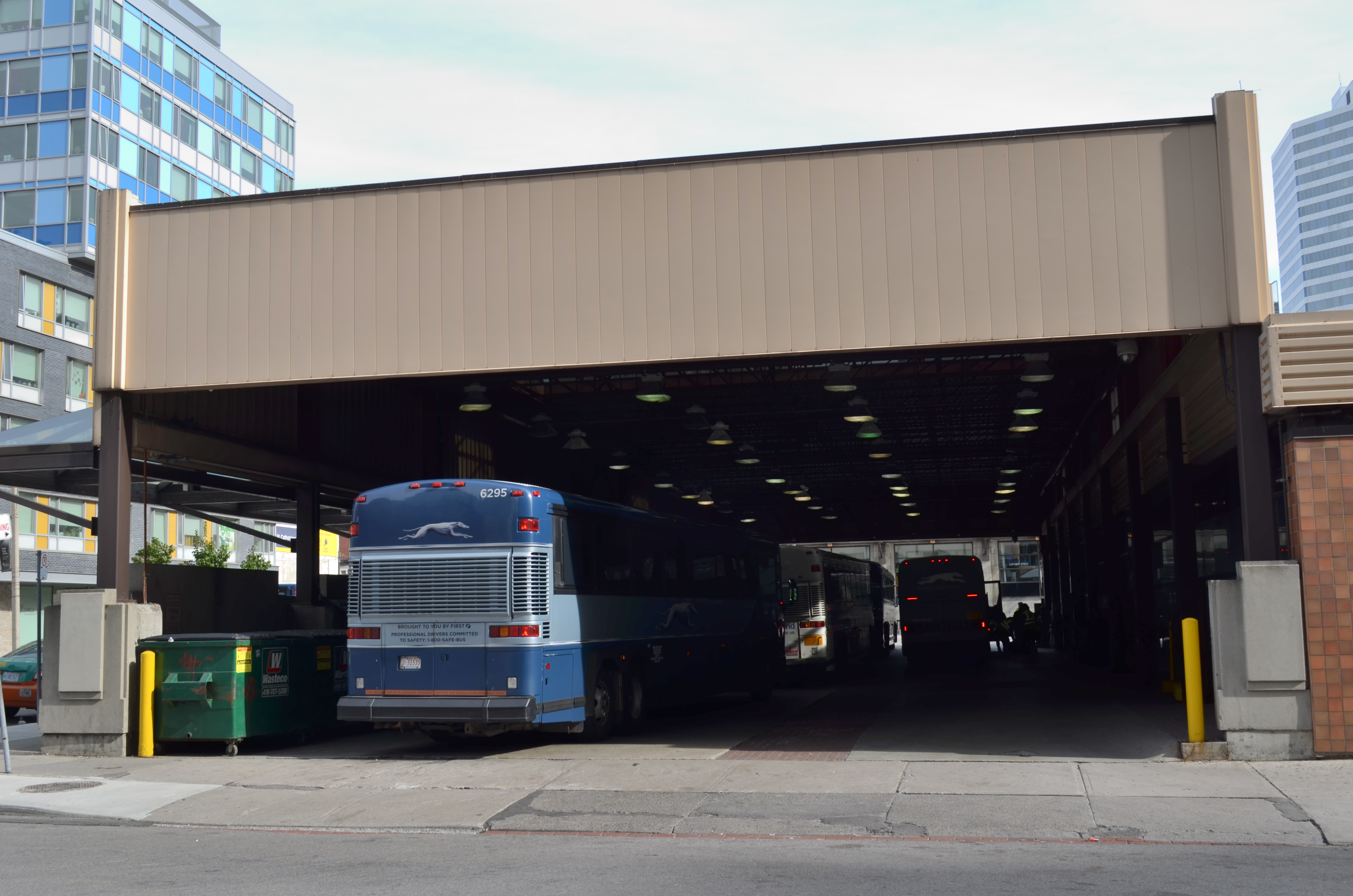
The back of the Terminal's Annex building from Chestnut Street. It is located west of the main terminal.

Greyhound Canada suspended service in May 2020 due to the COVID-19 pandemic, and announced on May 13, 2021, that they were permanently ending Canadian operations. Coach Canada/Megabus relocated to the new Union Station Bus Terminal, effective June 8, 2021. Ontario Northland Motor Coach Services, the last remaining bus line that used the Toronto Coach Terminal, relocated to Union Station effective July 4, 2021, bringing the Toronto Coach Terminal's role as a bus depot to a close after almost 90 years of service.

== Redevelopment ==
On October 29, 2019, Toronto City Council identified the Bay and Elizabeth Street terminal properties as an asset that is underutilized, "with an opportunity to unlock value and address City needs and City building objectives, such as affordable housing, employment uses and community infrastructure." Despite its age, the structure is only a "listed property" in the City's Heritage Register, offering a 60 day window that the property owner has to notify the City before moving or demolishing the structure.

In April 2022, Toronto City Council approved a plan to redevelop the site into a mixed-income, mixed-use development that includes affordable housing, and a paramedics multi-hub, and office spaces for the life science and biomedical sectors.

According to Vic Gupta, CEO of CreateTO, the city's real estate arm, "approximately 750 homes could be included in these sites with approximately 250 being affordable homes.”

Create TO announced in November 2022 that it is seeking bids from developers. In June 2023, CreateTO announced its shortlist of bidders submitting proposals to redevelop 610 Bay Street and 130 Elizabeth Street:

- Capital Developments
- Hines Canada
- Kilmer Group & EllisDon Inc.
- MOD Developments
- TAS Developments
- Tricon Residential
- Tridel Group & Woodbourne Capital Management

On November 21, 2024, Mayor Olivia Chow announced that the site, including both the former Bay Street and Elizabeth Street terminals, would be redeveloped as a mixed-income, mixed-use development that is to include affordable housing, a paramedics hub, and new public plaza. Two towers are to be built and will include residential, retail and public space. The residential component is to consist of 873 homes, 290 of which will be affordable rental units. There is to be "adaptive reuse of the existing heritage building as well as streetscape improvements", and the project is to include an organ repair centre for transplants, operated by the University Health Network, and housing options for health workers. Kilmer Group and Tricon Residential (Kilmer-Tricon) were announced by the city and CreateTO as the developers.

Due to the cooling market for rental apartments and rising construction costs, city staff recommended in June 2025 that the city agree to amend the redevelopment plan to remove two dozen affordable housing units from the originally proposed 290 units and also offer the builder an additional $36.8 million in order to keep the developers on board. Construction is to begin in December 2025.

== Ownership ==
The terminal was originally owned by Gray Coach Lines when it was a Toronto Transit Commission subsidiary. When the TTC sold Gray Coach in 1990, it retained the terminal, transferring ownership to Toronto Coach Terminal Inc. (TCTI), a wholly owned subsidiary of the TTC. The TTC managed the station directly until July 8, 2012, when it was leased out in its entirety to bus lines Coach Canada and Greyhound Canada for CA$1.2 million annually, in what was initially a five-year contract. As a result, the coach lines took over the operational control of the terminal and opened their own ticket booths, where previously TTC employees had handled ticket sales and taken a commission in addition to platform fees charged to the coach companies. The lease, which was last renewed for a year in 2020, expired on July 7, 2021.

In April 2017, TTC staff proposed for the terminal to be declared surplus when Coach Canada and Greyhound Canada vacated the terminal.

The board of the TCTI on June 16, 2021 voted to accept a recommendation to transfer the property to the City of Toronto, effective July 8, 2021, in exchange for payment by the city of CA$4.2 million so that TCTI could pay back the balance of a loan made to TCTI by the TTC when TCTI was created in 1990.

== Location ==
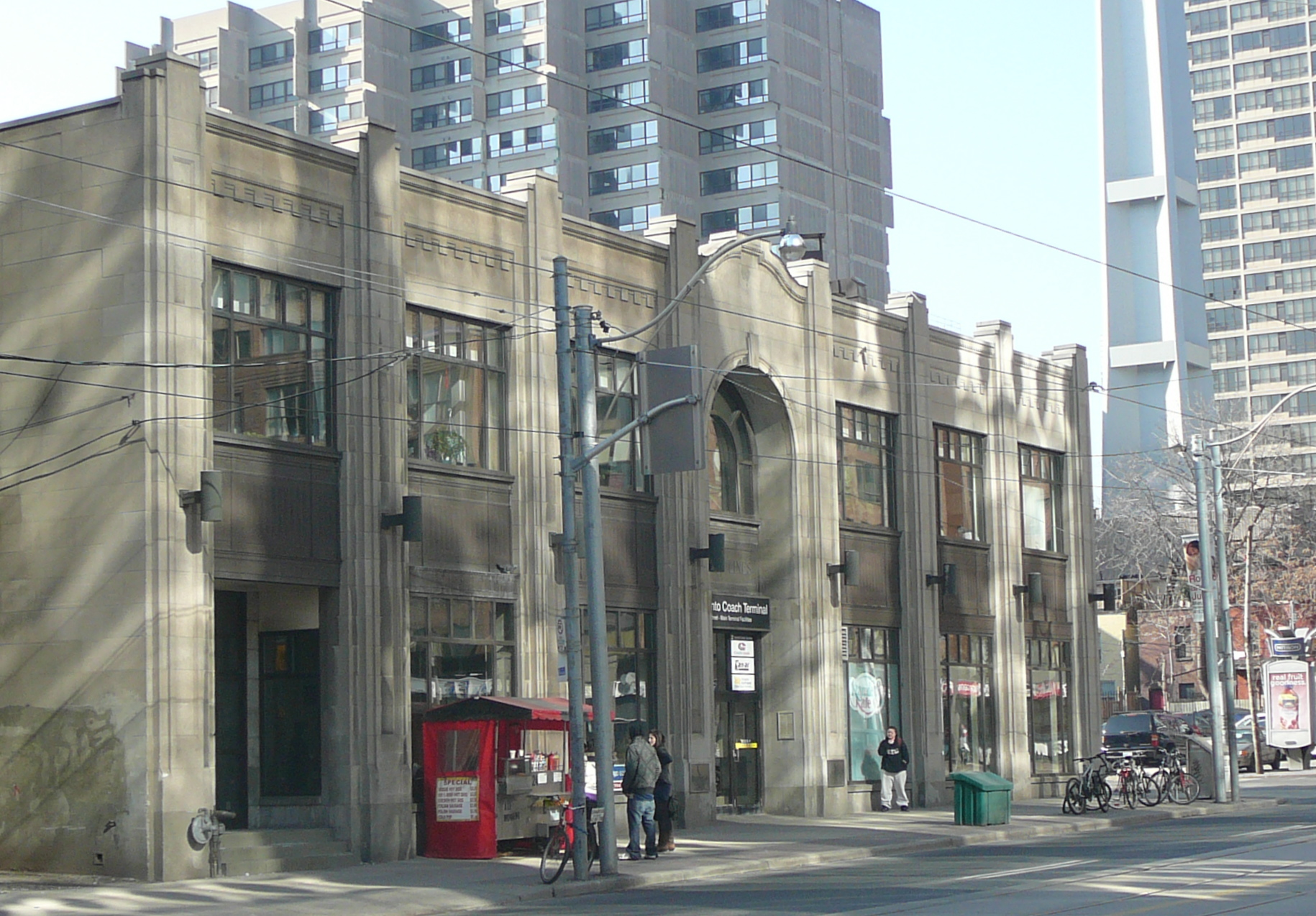
Entrance to the Toronto Coach Terminal on Bay Street

The Toronto Coach Terminal is located one block west of Dundas subway station and was connected to it via the underground PATH network. It is also about the same distance from St. Patrick subway station. The bus platforms are located on Edward Street, on the west side of the terminal building. A small side entrance on the west side of Elizabeth Street is connected to the main concourse area on Bay Street by a corridor behind the bus platforms.

Nearby landmarks include the Toronto Eaton Centre, the Atrium on Bay, the Hospital for Sick Children, and the Toronto City Hall and Nathan Phillips Square. It is also within walking distance of Chinatown.

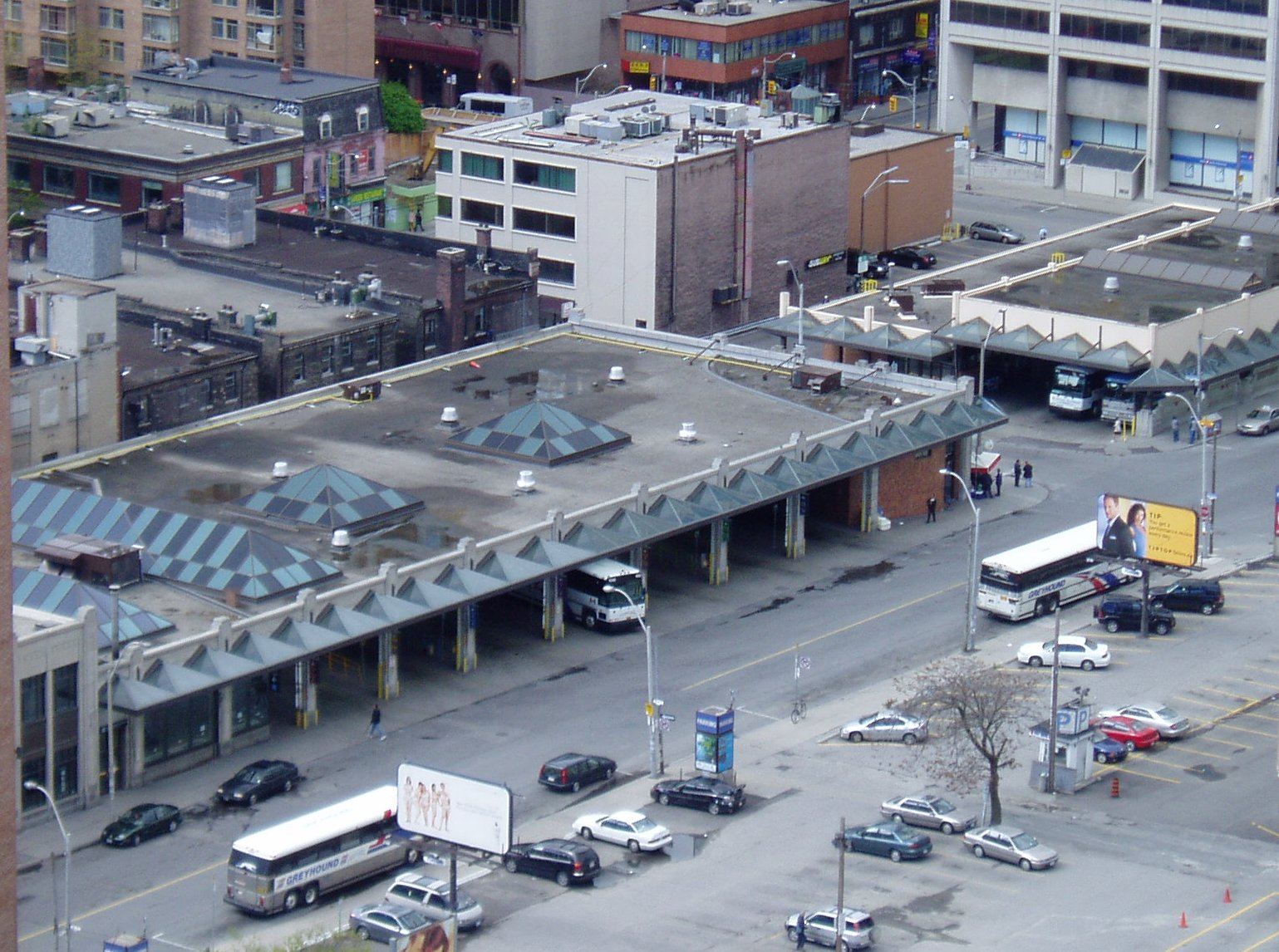
Aerial view of the Toronto Coach Terminal's seven double bay platforms, as well as the Annex building (right). The two apparent platform openings on the left side of the platform area are actually covered by windows and are part of the expanded waiting room, as a result of the 1990 renovations.

== See also ==
- Sunnyside Bus Terminal - Gray Coach's former bus station in Toronto's west end (1936-1991)
