= Central Greyhound Lines =

Central Greyhound Lines is a name used in six different contexts or applications in the intercity highway-coach industry in the USA. In each of the first five instances, the name was used for a regional operating company (that is, a division or subsidiary) of The Greyhound Corporation (the parent Greyhound firm). In the last instance, the name was used for an internal administrative department of the (second) Greyhound Lines, Inc., the (second) GLI, a separate, independent, unrelated firm, after the GLI bought the core bus business of The Greyhound Corporation.

== The first GLI ==
The Motor Transit Corporation (MTC), the original Greyhound firm, before it was renamed The Greyhound Corporation, started a new route between Chicago, Illinois, and Indianapolis, Indiana, in February 1927, four months after its formation (as the MTC).

To comply with an Indiana statute (one which required that corporations doing business in the Hoosier State be domiciled there), the MTC had already (in November 1926, the same month as its own incorporation) created a wholly owned subsidiary, based in Indiana and named as the Greyhound Lines, Inc., of Indiana (called also the GLI of Indiana), to conduct the route between Chicago and Indianapolis (mostly in Indiana).

Thereby the GLI of Indiana became the first business unit of the growing Greyhound empire to make a public use of the name of the Greyhound Lines.

The GLI of Indiana also took over another firm, the Blue Goose Lines, running in the Hoosier State from Indianapolis southward to Evansville and northward to Kokomo and onward to Fort Wayne (all four in Indiana), bought from Ralph Bogan and Swan Sundstrom, two original busmen from northern Minnesota. [The two sellers continued as key players at Greyhound. Bogan served eventually as the vice president of The Greyhound Corporation during the presidency of Orville Swan Caesar (1946–56), after the retirement of Carl Eric Wickman, the principal founder of Greyhound; Sundstrom served as a long-time president of the Pennsylvania Greyhound Lines.]

[In November 1926 the MTC created also a sister subsidiary, named as the Greyhound Lines, Inc., of Ohio (the GLI of Ohio), which in November 1927 began service between Detroit, Michigan, and Cincinnati, Ohio.]

[For a short time during 1927–28, there was also a third subsidiary (of the MTC) using the name of the Greyhound Lines, Inc. – the GLI of Delaware, which came into existence to buy the Purple Swan Safety Coach Lines, running between Chicago and Kansas City via Saint Louis (the two latter in Missouri), and which became renamed as the Pickwick-Greyhound Lines, after the Pickwick Corporation bought a one-half ownership interest in that firm (hence the hyphenated name). Later the route segment between Saint Louis and Kansas City became transferred to the Southwestern GL, and the segment between Chicago and Saint Louis became transferred to the Illinois GL (then to the Central GL, then eventually to the Great Lakes GL).]

In 1929 the MTC became renamed as The Greyhound Corporation (with an uppercase T, because the word "the" was an integral part of the legal name of the corporate entity).

The GLI of Indiana and the GLI of Ohio developed additional routes, mostly by buying existing properties.

During the early years of the growth of the Greyhound empire, the GLI of Indiana performed an important function, by operating a number of significant routes before they became transferred to other operating companies.

== The first Central GL ==
In 1930 The Greyhound Corporation, the parent Greyhound firm, formed two new regional companies – the Pennsylvania Greyhound Lines (GL) and the (first) Central GL.

The purpose of the Pennsylvania GL was to provide an entity in which the Pennsylvania Railroad (PRR) soon bought a minority interest, a subsidiary in a territory which coincided with the territory of the railway firm – so that the rail company could supplement its train service and substitute bus service in place of some of its unprofitable and marginally profitable passenger trains.

Greyhound then transferred the routes of the GLI of Indiana and the GLI of Ohio to the new companies. The east–west routes went to the Pennsylvania GL, as did the other ones paralleling other lines of the PRR. The remaining routes [that is, those between Evansville and Indianapolis and between Detroit and Cincinnati and onward to Louisville (in Kentucky)] went to the (first) Central GL.

The GLI of Indiana and the GLI of Ohio then went out of existence.

== Ohio GL ==
The (first) Central GL in 1935 (five years later) became renamed as the Ohio Greyhound Lines (completely different and separate from the GLI of Ohio, which had gone out of existence in 1930) – to allow Greyhound to reassign the name Central to a new subsidiary, in the Midwest and the Northeast, one in an area which coincided with the territory of another major railway company, the New York Central (NYC) System, one in which Greyhound transferred a minority non-voting interest to the NYC System. The Greyhound executives wished for the latter subsidiary to bear a name (Central) which suggested the kinship with the related railway firm (New York Central), as in the case of the neighboring Pennsylvania GL and the Pennsylvania Railroad.

[For several years during the 1930s, the coaches of the Central GL and the Pennsylvania GL bore (in addition to their usual Greyhound markings) the logos of the related railway companies – the oval (or ellipse) of the NYC System and the keystone of the "Pennsy" Railroad.]

Despite the name of the Ohio GL, the firm was based in Indiana (as had been the GLI of Indiana and the first Central GL), to satisfy the statutory requirement of the Hoosier State for domestic corporations for operations there.

The Ohio GL continued to increase its route network throughout its area, mostly by the acquisition of existing carriers.

== The second Central GL ==
Thus the second Central GL came into existence in 1935, based in Cleveland, Ohio, as a subsidiary of The Greyhound Corporation, and it continued until late in 1954, when it was merged into the Pennsylvania GL.

{In the next year, 1955, the enlarged Pennsylvania GL became redesignated as the Eastern Division of The Greyhound Corporation [called also the (second) Eastern GL], the first of four huge new divisions (along with Southern, Western, and another Central).}

The (second) Central GL came from three major components:

first, the former Safety Motor Coach Lines, running from Chicago into Michigan (including the routes between Chicago and Detroit) and throughout the western part of the Lower Peninsula of Michigan;

second, the routes between Chicago and New York City via Cleveland (in Ohio), including the route via Buffalo, Rochester, Syracuse, and Albany (all four in the Empire State), paralleling the touted "water-level route" of the New York Central (railway) System [in contrast with the shorter mountainous route of the Pennsylvania Railroad between Chicago and New York City via Fort Wayne (in Indiana), Bucyrus, Mansfield, and Canton (all three in Ohio), and Pittsburgh, Altoona, Harrisburg, and Philadelphia (all four in Pennsylvania)];

third, a large route network throughout upstate New York, with one extension to Montréal, Québec, Canada, and another from Albany to Boston via Pittsfield, Springfield, and Worcester (all the last four in Massachusetts).

The first major part of the (second) Central GL, the Safety Motor Coach Lines, had been founded (with the backing of Wickman) in 1924 by Edwin (Ed) Eckstrom, an accountant, born in Ludington, Michigan, and raised in Hibbing, Minnesota. [Eckstrom in -17 had become an investor and participant in the Mesaba Transportation Company, based in Hibbing, the first incorporated firm (which replaced the Hibbing Transportation Company, a partnership consisting of Eric Wickman, Ralph Bogan, and others) which led to the founding of the Greyhound empire.]

In 1926, after the Motor Transit Corporation (MTC) came into existence, its first purchase was Eckstrom's Safety Motor Coach Lines, and Eckstrom became the first president of the MTC.

[When the MTC bought the Safety Motor Coach Lines, Eckstrom's company contributed to the MTC not only the name Greyhound and the image of a greyhound dog but also the blue-and-white livery (color scheme) used on Eckstrom's coaches. Eckstrom is said to have proposed the use of the name of the Greyhound Lines even before he left (with the support of his associates in Minnesota) to go back eastward. For more details please see the article about the Great Lakes GL.]

In 1929 the Safety Motor Coach Lines (as a subsidiary of the MTC) took over the Interstate Stages (which had used the brand name of the Oriole Lines and had named its coaches as the Oriole Flyers), the Southwestern Michigan Motor Coach Company, and the YellowaY of Michigan (a part of the YellowaY-Pioneer System, bought from the American Motor Transportation Company), all three of which firms Greyhound had acquired through a related company, named as the Automotive Investments, Inc., based in Duluth, Minnesota.

In 1930 the Safety Motor Coach Lines became renamed as the Eastern Greyhound Lines (EGL) of Michigan, then in -35 (briefly) as the (third) Central Greyhound Lines (CGL) of Michigan; then in -36, it merged into the undenominated main (second) Central GL.

[In 1948 Greyhound transferred all the Michigan routes of the (second) Central GL (formerly those of the Safety Motor Coach Lines) to the Great Lakes GL, which had begun in 1941.]

The second major part of the (second) Central GL, the routes between Chicago and New York City via Cleveland, began in 1923, when Clark McConnell, a lawyer in Cleveland, founded the Cleveland-Ashtabula-Conneaut (CAC) Bus Company, running about 71 miles from Cleveland to Conneaut (both in Ohio), reaching to the east-northeast on the way toward Erie, Pennsylvania, and Buffalo, New York.

[McConnell had begun in the bus industry in 1919 by taking part in starting two other firms – the Cleveland-Akron Bus Company and the Cleveland-Elyria-Toledo Bus Company (which latter firm, despite its name, ran from Cleveland only as far as Norwalk, beyond Elyria but short of Toledo); O.B. Baskett, a former driver and sometime manager for those two firms (1919–24), in 1925, after a brief stint in North Carolina, began running coaches of his own in East Tennessee between Knoxville and Johnson City, then in 1928 co-founded the Tennessee Coach Company, which long (1929–56) cooperated (in part by running through-coaches on through-schedules in pool interline operations) with the Atlantic GL, the Dixie GL, and (especially) the Southeastern GL, but which in 1956 became a member of the Trailways association (then named as the National Trailways Bus System), and which in 1966 became a wholly owned subsidiary of the Continental Trailways.]

[While Baskett lived in North Carolina (1924–25), he worked for the Carolina Motor Coaches, which soon became a major part of the newly founded Carolina Coach Company, which in 1940 became a member of the National Trailways association (and thereby became known also as the Carolina Trailways), and which in 1997 became a wholly owned subsidiary of the (second) Greyhound Lines, Inc., the (second) GLI.]

[One curious result of that last step is that now a Greyhound subsidiary (the Carolina Coach Company, the Carolina Trailways) is a member of the Trailways association (now named as the Trailways Transportation System).]

The CAC Bus Company in 1927 extended its route to Buffalo.

CAC in the next year, 1928, became renamed as the Great Lakes Stages (GLS), and it extended all the way to New York City – via Buffalo and Olean (all three in New York), Port Allegany, Mansfield, Scranton, and Stroudsburg (all four in Pennsylvania), and Columbia, Dover, and Newark (all three in New Jersey). [Some of the trips of the GLS ran directly between Erie and Olean via Jamestown (in the Empire State), thus bypassing Buffalo; others ran directly between Erie and Port Allegany via Warren (in Pennsylvania), thus bypassing not only Buffalo but also both Jamestown and Olean.]

The GLS also developed a branch line between Erie and Pittsburgh (both in the Keystone State).

In 1929 the Motor Transit Corporation (MTC) bought the GLS, and (in a separate transaction) the MTC became renamed as The Greyhound Corporation.

The GLS became renamed as the Eastern Greyhound Lines (EGL) of Ohio (completely different and separate from the GLI of Ohio, which had gone out of existence in 1930, and the Ohio GL, which then still ran between Evansville and Indianapolis and between Detroit and Louisville).

The other route between Cleveland and New York City (the "water-level route" via Buffalo, Rochester, Syracuse, and Albany) came into existence during the development of the set of routes described next.

The prelude to the third major part of the (second) Central GL, the routes in upstate New York (with the two extensions), began in 1913 in the Thousand Islands region, a resort area along the border between Canada and the US, on the Saint Lawrence River, which is the outlet to the Atlantic Ocean from Lake Ontario and therefore also from all five of the Great Lakes.

In 1913 Fred Dailey began service (with a Cadillac open touring car) between Watertown, New York, the nearest town with a train station (in the US), and Alexandria Bay, on the southern shore of the Saint Lawrence River, a distance of about 32 miles.

Dailey and others, with various degrees of success (or lack of it) developed a number of routes throughout the region. Dailey also extended downstream from Alexandria Bay to Ogdensburg.

In 1923 Walter Aldrich and others started a bus firm to run from Syracuse to Watertown, about 73 miles to the north. [Aldrich already owned a firm running from Syracuse to Norwich, about 66 miles to the southeast, using Fageol Safety Coaches.]

By the next year, 1924, Aldrich alone ran the line between Watertown and Syracuse, using Fageols, on the first highway link between that part of northern New York and the rest of the Empire State. He also took over the two routes between Watertown and Alexandria Bay.

In 1925 a group of investors in Watertown set out to assemble a bus line between Binghamton (in the Empire State) and the Canada–US border, a distance of about 180 miles. They formed the Colonial Motor Coach Corporation, which then bought Aldrich's routes from Watertown to Syracuse and from Watertown to Alexandria Bay. Colonial then developed routes from Watertown to Utica and to Plattsburgh (via Canton, Potsdam, and Malone) plus several branch and feeder lines, mostly by the purchase of existing firms.

By 1928 Colonial had indeed extended from Syracuse – not only just to Binghamton but also all the way to New York City – along two routes – one via Binghamton and Scranton (in Pennsylvania) and one via Utica, Albany, Kingston, and Newburgh (all four in the Empire State), in part along the west shore of the Hudson River, and via Ridgewood (in New Jersey).

[The route segment between Scranton and New York City, with interstate rights only (that is, without intrastate authority), duplicated a segment of the Great Lakes Stages on its route between Cleveland and New York City.]

Colonial continued to increase its route network within its area (that is, in the central part of upstate New York).

Late in 1928, Colonial extended westwardly from Syracuse to Rochester, then early in 1929 eastwardly from Albany to Boston (in Massachusetts) and westwardly again from Rochester to Buffalo.

In 1928 Colonial began acquiring the intrastate rights between Syracuse and Buffalo by buying existing firms; that process continued until 1930, after it had become a member of the Greyhound family.

In 1929 the Motor Transit Corporation (MTC) bought the Colonial Motor Coach Corporation, and (in a separate transaction) the MTC became renamed as The Greyhound Corporation.

Colonial became renamed as the Eastern Greyhound Lines (EGL) of New York.

[When Greyhound bought Colonial (in 1929) and renamed it as the EGL of New York, Greyhound thereby made its first presence in New England (between Albany and Boston, along the entire width of Massachusetts).]

== The first Eastern GL ==
In April 1929, as previously mentioned, the Motor Transit Corporation (MTC) formed the Eastern GL (EGL), as a holding company (rather than an operating company), to own a number of Greyhound subsidiaries (both existing ones and future ones) to the east of Chicago – other than the Pennsylvania GL, in which the Pennsylvania Railroad would hold a large but minority interest.

In 1929 the MTC bought both the Great Lakes Stages and the Colonial Motor Coach Corporation, then in 1930 renamed the GLS as the EGL of Ohio and renamed Colonial as the EGL of New York. [Those two operating companies, the EGL of Ohio and the EGL of New York, became operating subsidiaries of the undenominated main EGL (the holding company), as did the EGL of Michigan (formerly the Safety Motor Coach Lines) and the EGL of New England (which began running in 1930, between Boston and New York City).]

Even before the MTC completed its purchase of Colonial, a number of Colonial coaches began to appear in the Greyhound livery, including lettering for the Colonial Greyhound Lines (which never existed at all as a distinct or separate entity) – in part (for a short time) to take advantage of the goodwill attached to the name of Colonial.

Likewise, the names of the GLS and Colonial were retained and used in public for a while.

In 1928 the MTC bought the Detroit-Toledo-Cleveland Bus Company, which served the cities which the name indicates, then in 1931, Greyhound merged it into the EGL of Michigan (formerly the Safety Motor Coach Lines), then transferred that route to the EGL of Ohio (formerly the Great Lakes Stages).

Thus by 1933, Greyhound consolidated the entire service between Cleveland and Chicago (including the branch from Toledo to Detroit) in the EGL of Ohio (formerly the Great Lakes Stages).

Later in 1933, however, Greyhound transferred the routes from Cleveland to Detroit and to Chicago (from the EGL of Ohio) back into the EGL of Michigan (formerly the Safety Motor Coach Lines), then merged the remainder of the EGL of Ohio (formerly the Great Lakes Stages) into the EGL of New York.

Thus the former GLS routes between Cleveland and New York City and all the former Colonial routes became consolidated in the EGL of New York.

== The third Central GL ==
In 1935 The Greyhound Corporation renamed the (first) Eastern GL, a holding company, as the (second) Central GL – to attach the name Central to the territory coinciding with that of the New York Central (railway) System (in preparation for the pending transfer of a minority interest in the new Greyhound subsidiary, the Central GL, to the NYC System) – and Greyhound renamed the EGL of Michigan (formerly the Safety Motor Coach Lines) as the CGL of Michigan (the third Central GL), as a subsidiary of the main (second) Central GL.

The CGL of Michigan (formerly the Safety Motor Coach Lines) continued only until the next year, 1936, when (in a move as a part of a tax strategy) Greyhound merged it into the undenominated main (second) Central GL.

== The fourth Central GL ==
In 1935, in connection with the renaming of the (first) Eastern GL as the (second) Central GL and the EGL of Michigan as the CGL of Michigan, Greyhound also renamed the EGL of New York as the CGL of New York (as subsidiaries of the (second) Central GL. [Thus, the CGL of New York became the fourth entity to use the name of the Central GL.]

[At the same time, however, the EGL of New England continued with the same name, because of its location, which was (and is) clearly eastern rather than central, and which was outside the territory of the NYC (railway) System.]

In 1936 The Greyhound Corporation began to eliminate its multiple (and often complex) intermediate holding companies (between the parent firm and the operating companies) – to avoid a hugely increased federal income tax on the undistributed earnings of corporate subsidiaries – one under the Revenue Act of 1936, which the national Congress had passed as a means by which to cause (or force) a simplification of complex corporate structures in the public-utility industries (including the transportation industries).

In that same year, 1936, Greyhound (by necessity) applied to the federal Interstate Commerce Commission (ICC) for its mandatory approval to merge the EGL of New England (as a division) into The Greyhound Corporation and to merge both the CGL of Michigan and the CGL of New York (as divisions rather than subsidiaries) into the main (second) Central GL.

The ICC approved.

In 1936 Greyhound merged the EGL of New England as a division (formerly a subsidiary of the CGL, a subsidiary of The Greyhound Corporation) into the parent firm, thereby converting The Greyhound Corporation into an operating company (rather than merely a holding company).

Thereby the parent firm, The Greyhound Corporation, became a carrier in its own right (for the first time) and with its own authority (with its own ICC-MC number).

Also in that same year, 1936, Greyhound merged the CGL of Michigan into the main CGL, which continued as a subsidiary of the parent firm.

However, the Public-service Commission (PSC) of the State of New York, which also held jurisdiction over the activities of the CGL of New York within the boundaries of its own state, withheld its approval – saying that the proposed merger would jeopardize its authority over operations within its state.

Therefore, the CGL of New York remained (until the end of 1955) as a separate corporate entity and as a subsidiary (of the main second CGL), but as a subsidiary of a subsidiary (no longer as a subsidiary of a holding company).

In December 1955 the New York PSC finally agreed to drop its requirement for a domestic Greyhound subsidiary in New York – on the condition that Greyhound continue to obtain the vehicular base registration in New York for all the coaches assigned to the routes operating in that state.

[In 1937 The Greyhound Corporation formed the New England GL (NEGL, as the first direct subsidiary of the parent company itself), thereby becoming a carrier (for the first time) rather than merely a holding company; in 1939 the federal ICC gave its required approval, and the NEGL began operating; in 1940 Greyhound transferred to the NEGL the routes of the EGL of New England between Boston and New York City (on which the latter firm had begun in 1930); then the EGL of New England continued running to the north of Boston, on routes which it had acquired in the meantime, to Portland, Maine, then on several lines in Maine, reaching eventually Saint Stephen, New Brunswick, Canada, on the border, across from Calais, in the eastern part of Maine, until 1950, when it became merged into the NEGL.]

== More growth for Central GL ==
The (second) Central GL continued to develop its route network, mostly and typically, by acquiring other properties.

In 1942 the CGL of New York bought the Champlain Coach Lines, thereby gaining its routes between New York City and Montréal, Québec, Canada, including a branch on the east shore of the Hudson River (via Hudson, Poughkeepsie, and Beacon) between Albany and New York City and a branch along each side of Lake Champlain [on the west side via Plattsburgh (in New York) and on the east side via Rutland and Burlington (both in Vermont)] between Albany and Rouse's Point, New York, at the Canada–US border.

In 1946 the main (second) Central GL bought the West Ridge Transportation Company and its wholly owned subsidiary, the Buffalo and Erie Coach Corporation, thereby gaining their route networks, roughly within an irregular polygon enclosed by line segments connecting Ashtabula, Erie, Buffalo, Olean, and Pittsburgh, then back to Erie. The routes in the southwest corner of the Empire State became transferred to the CGL of New York.

== Further events for Central GL ==
In 1947 The Greyhound Corporation finished reacquiring the remaining shares of the non-voting common stock in the Central GL which (in 1935) it had transferred to the NYC System. [It had begun to reacquire it in 1937.]

No longer having a need to maintain a subsidiary coinciding with the territory of that railway firm, Greyhound next reorganized some of its routes in the Midwest and the Northeast, seeking a more efficient operation.

During 1948 The Greyhound Corporation merged the Illinois GL into the main (second) Central GL. The routes involved, all in Illinois except into three cities on state lines, were those between Chicago and Effingham (in Illinois and on the way to Memphis in Tennessee and New Orleans in Louisiana), between Chicago and Saint Louis (in Missouri) via Springfield (in Illinois), between Chicago and Louisiana (not the state of Louisiana but rather the city of Louisiana in the state of Missouri and on a shortcut, bypassing Saint Louis, to Kansas City, on the state line between Kansas and Missouri), between Springfield and Champaign (both in Illinois), and between Davenport (in Iowa) and both Champlain and Springfield.

On the last day of 1948, Greyhound converted the main (second) Central GL from a subsidiary into a division of The Greyhound Corporation, thus ending the separate existence of the CGL as a corporate entity – after the completion of reacquiring the stock in the CGL which the NYC (railway) System had held.

In 1954 Greyhound merged the main (second) Central GL (along with the Capitol GL and the Richmond GL) into the Pennsylvania GL, then in the next year, 1955, the enlarged Pennsylvania GL (along with the New England GL) became redesignated as the Eastern Division of The Greyhound Corporation [called also the (second) Eastern GL], the first of the four huge new divisions (along with Southern, Western, and another Central).

Thus ended the second Central GL, and thus began the second Eastern GL.

About the end of 1955 Greyhound merged the CGL of New York into the new Eastern Division [the (second) Eastern GL].

Thus ended the fourth Central GL.

== Through-coaches on through-routes ==
The main (second) CGL and the CGL of New York ran a large number of through-coaches along their own routes, including those between Chicago and Boston, Chicago and New York City, and Montréal and New York City.

At first they took part in relatively few pool interlined through-routes in cooperation with other Greyhound operating companies – those between Montréal and Washington, DC, and between Syracuse and Philadelphia [both with the Pennsylvania GL], between Cleveland and Miami (in Florida) [with the Atlantic GL and the Florida GL], and eventually between New York City and San Francisco [with the Overland GL and the Pacific GL].

Starting in 1948 (after receiving the routes of the former Illinois GL), the main (second) Central GL took part in several more pool interlined through-routes – those between Chicago and New Orleans (in Louisiana) [with the Dixie GL and the Teche GL], between Chicago and both Houston and Laredo (both in Texas) [both with the Southwestern GL], and between Chicago and Los Angeles (in California) [with the Southwestern GL and the Pacific GL].

== Meeting other Greyhound companies ==
The (second) CGL and the CGL of New York met the Eastern Canadian GL to the north, the New England GL and the EGL of New England to the east, the Northland GL, the Overland GL, and the Southwestern GL to the west, the Atlantic GL and the Dixie GL to the south, the Great Lakes GL at several points between Chicago and Detroit, and the Pennsylvania GL at various points along most of their routes.

== The fifth Central GL ==
In September 1957, in another round of consolidation, The Greyhound Corporation merged the Great Lakes GL with the Northland GL (called also Northland or NGL), a neighboring operating company, thereby forming the Central Division of The Greyhound Corporation (called also the Central GL, making the fifth of six uses of that name), the second of four huge new divisions (along with Eastern, Southern, and Western).

Thus ended the Great Lakes GL and the Northland GL, and thus began the fifth Central GL.

Later (about 1966) The Greyhound Corporation reorganized again, into just two humongous divisions, named as the Greyhound Lines East (GLE) and the Greyhound Lines West (GLW); even later (about 1970) it eliminated those two divisions, thereby leaving a single gargantuan undivided nationwide fleet.

== The sixth Central GL ==
For a short time late in the 1980s, the (second) Greyhound Lines, Inc., the (second) GLI, made the sixth and last use of the name of the Central Greyhound Lines, not as an operating division but rather as an administrative department (in bookkeeping and other internal purposes), along with the Eastern GL, the Southern GL, and the Western GL.

== Beyond Central GL ==
In 1987 The Greyhound Corporation (the original parent Greyhound firm), which had become widely diversified far beyond transportation, sold its entire highway-coach operating business (its core bus business) to a new company, named as the (second) Greyhound Lines, Inc., also called the (second) GLI, based in Dallas, Texas – a separate, independent, unrelated firm, which was the property of a group of private investors under the promotion of Fred Currey, a former executive of the Continental Trailways (later renamed as the Trailways, Inc., also called TWI, also based in Dallas), which was by far the largest member company in the Trailways association.

Later in 1987 the (second) Greyhound Lines, Inc., the (second) GLI, the new firm based in Dallas, further bought the Trailways, Inc., the TWI, its largest competitor, and merged it into the GLI.

Later in 1987 the Greyhound Lines, Inc., the GLI, the new firm based in Dallas, further bought the Trailways, Inc., the TWI, its largest competitor, and merged it into the GLI.

The lenders and the other investors of the GLI ousted Fred Currey as the chief executive officer (CEO) after the firm went into bankruptcy in 1990.

The GLI has since continued to experience difficulties and lackluster performance under a succession of new owners and new executives while continuing to reduce its level of service – by hauling fewer passengers aboard fewer coaches on fewer trips along fewer routes with fewer stops in fewer communities in fewer states – and by doing so on fewer days – that is, increasingly operating some trips less often than every day (fewer than seven days per week) – and by using fewer through-coaches, thus requiring passengers to make more transfers (from one coach to another).

After the sale to the GLI, The Greyhound Corporation (the original parent Greyhound firm) changed its name to the Greyhound-Dial Corporation, then the Dial Corporation, then the Viad Corporation. [The contrived name Viad appears to be a curious respelling of the former name Dial – if one scrambles the letters D, I, and A, then turns the V upside down and regards it as the Greek letter lambda – Λ – that is, the Greek equivalent of the Roman or Latin letter L.]

The website of the Viad Corporation (http://www.viad.com) in September 2008 makes no mention of its corporate history or its past relationship to Greyhound – that is, its origin as The Greyhound Corporation.

== See also ==
- The Greyhound Corporation
- Atlantic Greyhound Lines
- Capitol Greyhound Lines
- Dixie Greyhound Lines
- Florida Greyhound Lines
- Great Lakes Greyhound Lines
- Southeastern Greyhound Lines
- Teche Greyhound Lines
- Tennessee Coach Company
