= Greyhound Canada =

Defunct Canadian intercity bus company

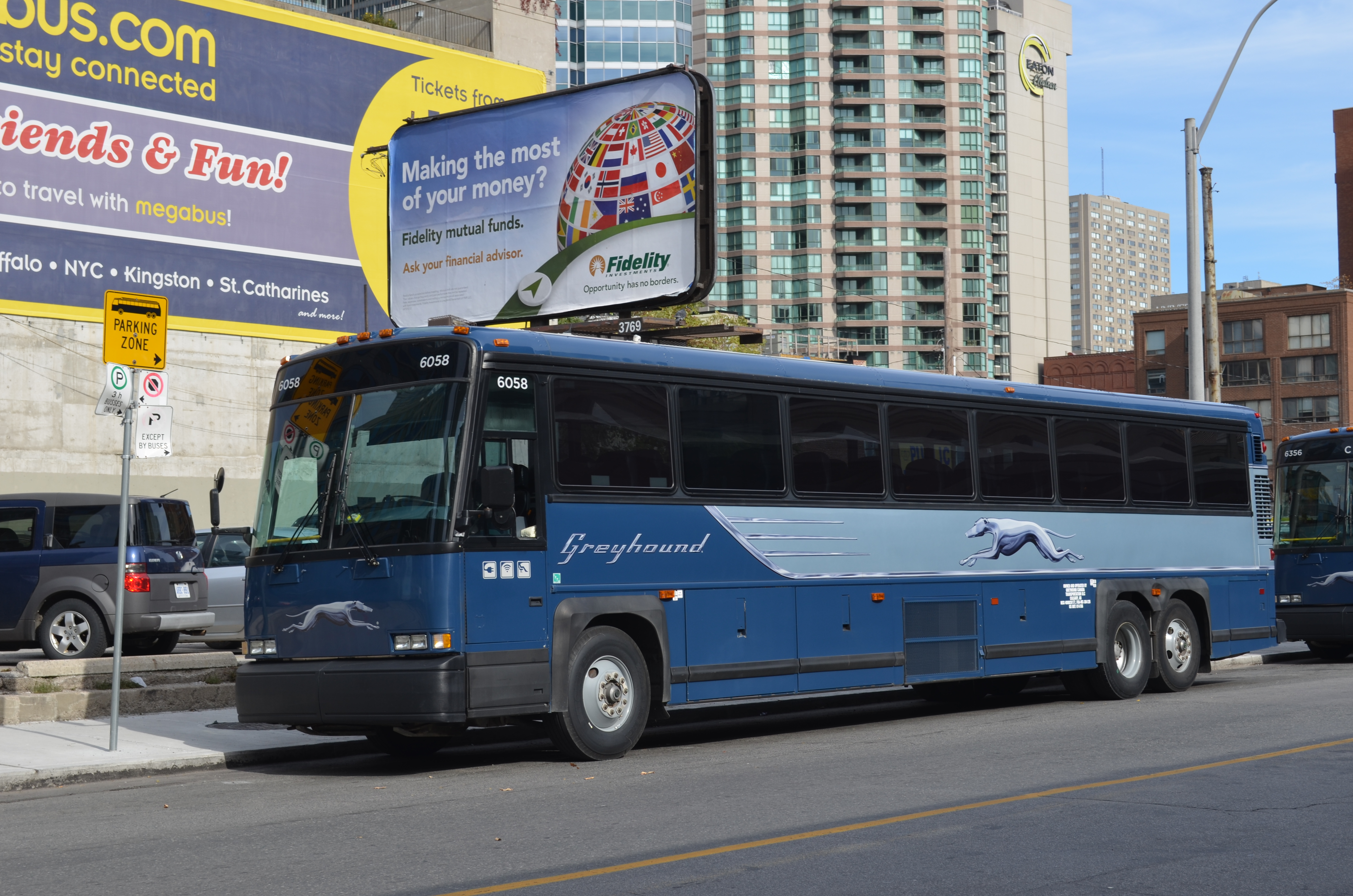
- Motor Coach Industries 102DL3 in Toronto in October 2014
- Founded: 1929
- Ceased operation: May 13, 2021
- Headquarters: Burlington, Ontario
- Service area: Western Canada (until 2018); Ontario and Quebec (until 2021)
- Service type: Intercity coach service
- Alliance: Greyhound Lines; Trailways of New York
- Website: www.greyhound.ca

Greyhound Canada Transportation ULC (Greyhound Canada) was an intercity coach service that began as a local British Columbia bus line in the early 1920s, expanded across most of Canada, and became a subsidiary of the American Greyhound Lines in 1940.

In 2018, Greyhound pulled out of Western Canada, preserving only domestic service in Ontario and Quebec, and trans-border routes to the United States.

On May 13, 2021, Greyhound Canada permanently suspended their operations in all of Canada. Cross-border routes to the United States would from that point forward be operated by Greyhound Lines (USA).

- Montreal to Boston
- Montreal to New York City
- Toronto to Buffalo (with connections to New York City)
- Vancouver to Seattle

== Timeline ==
1921: John Learmonth started a Nelson–Willow Point passenger and freight service in the West Kootenay region of southeastern BC.

1922: Learmonth extended the service eastward to the Balfour area. In a 1923 timetable, Old's Stage was the trading name, which operated a 15-person jitney service, connected by a river crossing to the Procter steamboat landing. On reopening for the 1924 season, the trading name changed to Learmonth.

1925: Before the establishment of the Harrop Cable Ferry, Learmonth switched his route westward to Trail. Learmonth is believed to have started the new Nelson–Procter service via the ferry.

1928: Learmonth commenced a Nelson–Kaslo service, driven by Herb Harrop. Serving the routes from Nelson were a 20-seat Pierce-Arrow bus named Marjorie to Trail, Muriel to Kaslo, and Patricia to Slocan City.

1929: Roosevelt (Speed) Olson formed Kootenay Valley Transportation Co. (KVT) to take over the three routes, having bought the business the previous November. Learmonth was district superintendent until retirement in 1965. KVT started a Nelson–Salmo–Spokane service. KVT purchased the J. Motherwell operations, the only remaining bus line in the district. Canadian Greyhound Coaches BC (CGBC) was registered. Speed's brother Barney and George B. Fay joined this expanding venture. W.L. Watson sold the partners Foothills Transportation Co. (FT), which operated Calgary–Nanton, Alberta.

1930: The shareholders formed Canadian Greyhound Coaches (CGC) in Alberta to create a route network within that province and to manage all existing operations. Barney Olson founded Canadian Yelloway Lines to assume the Calgary–Edmonton route when Brewster Transport lost the franchise. The partners amalgamated this business and their other ones as Central Canadian Greyhound Lines (CCG). The Alberta and BC operations became connected by a through service, but passengers initially had to change buses at the Crowsnest Pass border. Using interline agreements with two Washington-based companies, a Calgary–Edmonton–Spokane–Seattle through service was established. Canadian Greyhound Lines (CG) was formed for Ontario operations.

1931: CCG created interline services with other Alberta and Western US operators. When Greyhound USA sued to restrain CCG from using the Greyhound name, lengthy negotiations began. CG and Gray Coach Lines established Toronto Greyhound Lines, a joint venture, for a Toronto–Detroit route.

1933: CCG acquired Calgary & Eastern Bus Lines (established 1927).

1934: CCG acquired Alberta Montana Bus Lines (established 1930). Arrow Coach Lines (AC) transferred its Alberta routes to CGG.

1935: After negotiating since 1931, Greyhound US granted CCG a licence to use the Greyhound name and interline agreements with Pacific Greyhound, Northland Greyhound, and Washington Motor Coach. BC Greyhound (BCG) was established. BCG acquired Interior Greyhound Lines from O.K. Valley Freight Lines, which had purchased the enterprise the prior year. BCG acquired Cariboo Greyhound Lines.

1938: CCG acquired Trans-Continental Coach Lines (TCC) (established 1935) from Barney Olson and Midland Bus Lines of Alberta (established 1926). The latter had bought the Saskatchewan operations of Grey Goose Bus Lines in 1936.

1939: TG acquired Canadian-American Trailways of Ontario.

1940: CG acquired TG. TCC acquired Prairie Coach Lines (established 1933). BCG acquired Blue Funnel Lines. A restructuring of the group as Western Canadian Greyhound Lines (WCG) gave Greyhound USA 80 per cent ownership and Fay 20 per cent.

1941: CCG acquired AC, which was operating in Saskatchewan. WCG obtained the linking Big Bend Highway route.

1942: CCG bought the Calgary–Banff route from Brewster Transport. The US military contracted CCG to provide a Dawson Creek–Whitehorse service along the new Alaska Highway during World War II.

1944: CCG acquired Clark Transportation Co and Red Bus Lines (established 1929). BCG was merged into WCG. TG was renamed Eastern Canadian Greyhound Lines (ECG). Saskatchewan nationalized the intra-provincial Greyhound routes.

1945: ECG acquired Nickle Belt Transportation (established 1939) of Ontario.

1948: CG merged into ECG when Central Greyhound Lines disbanded and merged into Great Lakes Greyhound Lines. WCG became the major shareholder in Motor Coach Industries (MCI). By 1950, MCI had solely supplied the whole 129-coach Greyhound fleet.

1956: R.L. Borden became general manager when Fay retired.

1957: Greyhound Lines of Canada (GLC) was created as a public company to administer WCG and ECG operations. Greyhound USA owned 69 per cent.

1958: GLC acquired Moore's Trans-Canada Bus Lines (established 1940) of Manitoba.

1959: GLC became the operating company.

1962: The opening of Rogers Pass established a year-round connected all-Canadian network.

1965: GLC acquired Brewster Transport/Brewster Rocky Mountain Gray Line.

1969: GLC acquired Coachways System, operating in western Canada and Alaska.

Late 1980s–early 1990s: Freight was expanding, but passenger traffic rapidly declining. GLC disposed of marginal feeder routes and focused on long haul services.

1992: GLC acquired Gray Coach Lines, based in Ontario, from Stagecoach.

1993: MCI was sold.

1995: A major restructuring placed the intercity bus operations under Greyhound Canada Transportation Co (GCT), 76 per cent publicly owned, while the tourism business became a wholly owned subsidiary of Dial Corp.

1996: Greyhound Air began scheduled passenger flights with Boeing 727-200 jetliners on domestic routes in Canada in July 1996, suffered heavy losses, and ceased operations in September 1997.

1997: Laidlaw acquired GCT.

1998: GCT acquired Voyageur-Colonial of Montreal.

2007: FirstGroup bought Laidlaw.

2018: Prior to cancelling most all routes west of Sudbury, Ontario, an application the prior year included widespread proposed service cancellations and reductions.

2021: Prior to ceasing services in Ontario and Quebec, these routes were temporarily suspended in May 2020 because of the COVID-19 pandemic. During the 19-month closure of the Canada–US border, the respective Greyhound USA routes did not operate.

== Western Canada service termination ==
In February 2018 Greyhound Canada received permission to terminate its two remaining routes on Vancouver Island running from Victoria, British Columbia to Nanaimo and Vancouver. Tofino Bus Services subsequently took over these two Greyhound routes.

Greyhound Canada terminated service along Highway 16 between Prince George and Prince Rupert in British Columbia with the last run being on May 30, 2018. Greyhound said it was losing $35,000 per day on routes in Northern British Columbia and in parts of Vancouver Island, and had lost $70 million in the six years prior to 2018 At the time, BC Bus North stepped in to provide services between Fort Nelson, Prince Rupert, Prince George, Fort St. John and Dawson Creek.

Greyhound Canada also terminated service from Prince George, British Columbia to Whitehorse, Yukon with the last trip from Whitehorse occurring on May 30, 2018.

From 2014 to 2017, ridership along that part of the route between Dawson Creek and Fort Nelson had dropped from 18,307 to 9,647 passengers.

Greyhound Canada announced on July 9, 2018 that it was cancelling all services west of Sudbury, Ontario. The sole remaining route between Vancouver and Seattle would be operated by Greyhound USA. Greyhound Canada claimed the cancellations were due to declining ridership, which dropped 41% nationwide since 2010 and 8% in Western Canada alone in 2017. The cancellations took effect on October 31, 2018. Greyhound said that the decline in ridership was due to increased car ownership, subsidies to competing passenger carriers, competition from low-cost airlines and regulatory restrictions.

== COVID-19 and final service termination ==
COVID-19 caused a 95 percent drop in ridership. Thus, Greyhound reduced service on March 25, 2020 and suspended six routes on April 5, 2020. On May 6, 2020, Greyhound Canada announced it would temporarily shut down all its remaining bus services; the shutdown was announced as permanent on May 13, 2021. Greyhound refunded tickets and travel vouchers for travel after May 13.

Besides the pandemic, Greyhound also blamed ride sharing and subsidized competition from Via Rail for the shutdown, which affected 400 employees.

Greyhound Canada planned to sell its bus stations, and to sell its bus fleet. It placed its fleet of 38 buses on auction scheduled for January 18, 2022. Some of the buses feature wheelchair capability, leather seats, multimedia screens and on-board restrooms.

== Routes ==
Routes listed below are those that were in service prior to the then-temporary suspension of service in May 2020, all of which were permanently terminated in May 2021.

=== Regular service ===
At the time of its closure in 2021, Greyhound Canada's scheduled bus services were confined to Ontario and Quebec, although all routes were already suspended on May 13, 2020 due to the COVID-19 pandemic in Canada.

At the time of its service suspension, Greyhound Canada operated the following routes:

- Montreal-Ottawa-Toronto
- Niagara Falls-Toronto
- Ottawa–Kingston
- Sudbury–Ottawa/Toronto
- Toronto–London-Windsor
- Toronto–Kitchener/Guelph/Cambridge

Greyhound Canada also operated a number of services to the United States, but through services to large US cities were provided by the US-based Greyhound Lines. Most routes operated by Greyhound Canada were to border cities, such as Buffalo, and Detroit, with service further into the US provided by Greyhound Lines.

For travel into areas not served by Greyhound, passengers could sometimes transfer onto other bus lines which maintained inter-line agreements with Greyhound:

- Ontario Northland Motor Coach Services
- Orléans Express
- Maritime Bus
- Adirondack Trailways

=== QuickLink ===
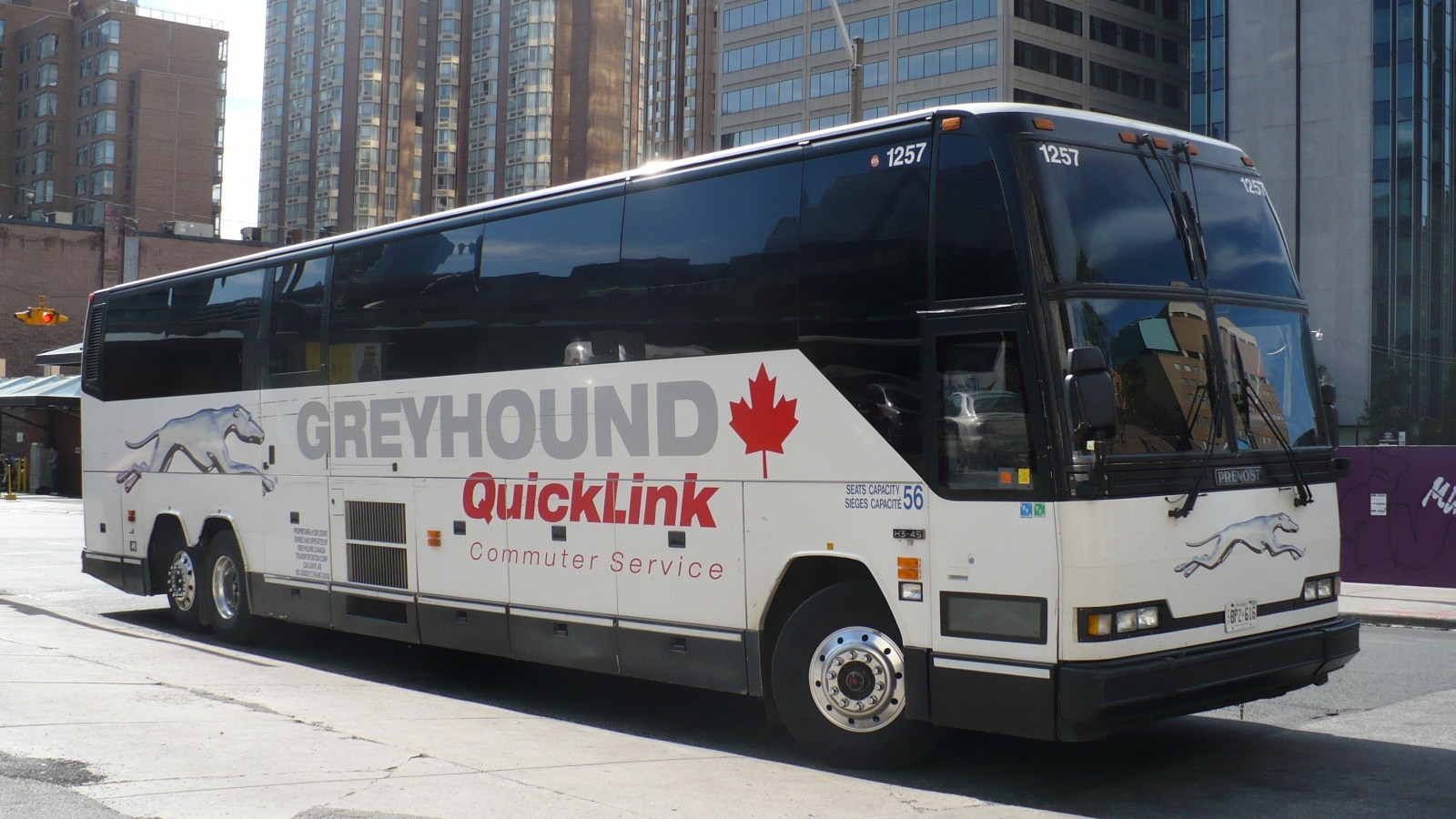
Prevost in QuickLink branding in 2008

Greyhound operated a commuter service in Southern Ontario known as 'QuickLink Commuter Service'. A list of cities served by this service:

- Barrie
- Belleville
- Cambridge
- Cornwall
- Grimsby
- Guelph
- Kitchener
- London
- Montreal
- Niagara Falls
- Ottawa
- Peterborough
- St Catharines
- Toronto

== Greyhound Courier Express ==
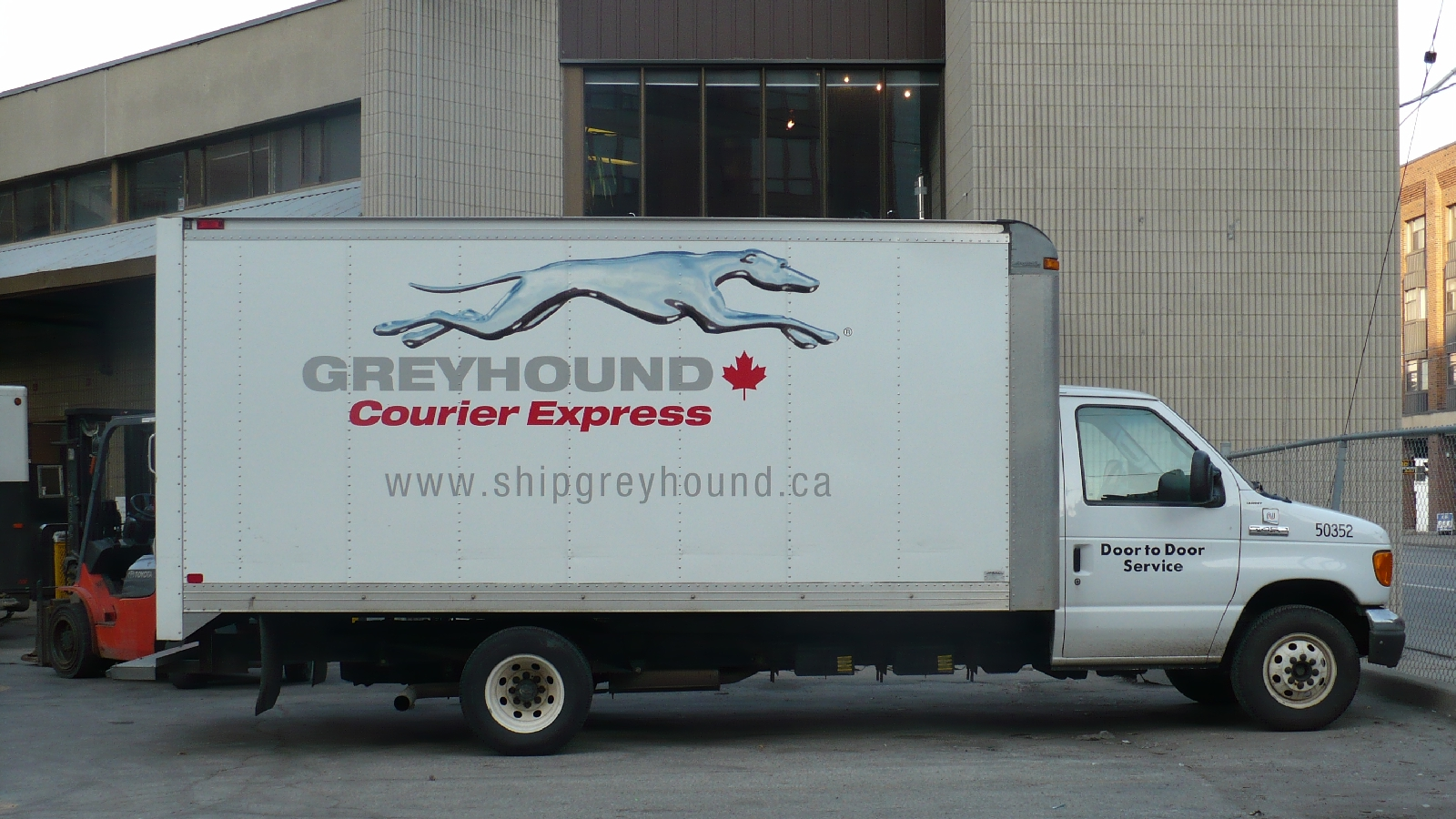
Greyhound Courier Express vehicle

In early decades, residents of rural communities visited the nearest post office, possibly miles away, to collect mail and packages. The bus lines that served these localities were the only couriers. Consequently, residents relied upon this affordable and reliable means for sending and receiving a range of smaller products. This included the delivery of newspapers, which the driver would throw through the open door or window of a bus.

Over the years, several Greyhound buses were converted to combos, where the rear half of the bus carried freight. The rear seats were removed, an extra freight door added, and the washroom relocated to the middle section. In 1984, Greyhound purchased four trucks for long distance use in BC. These carried 16 loaded aluminum containers. Where volumes justified, tractor trailers were used on major routes. However, in most instances, a bus towing a Greyhound U-Haul-type trailer was adequate.

In 1988, Greyhound Courier Express (GCX) became a separate division. By 2000, GCX generated 34 per cent of Greyhound revenue in Canada. A local GCX contractor might connect with the bus to collect or drop off items for that delivery area. The 2018 closure of Greyhound in Western Canada ended the GCX service, which accounted for about 1.15 million of the 1.2 million packages delivered annually, mainly for commercial customers. Although rates were cheaper than most couriers, delivery times were dependent upon bus schedules. Since 2010, package freight volume had dropped 35 per cent.

== Fleet ==
As at October 2018, Greyhound operated 436 vehicles, but it has an extended fleet through connecting operators:

== Unions ==
- Amalgamated Transit Union Local 1415 represented unionized Greyhound employees in Ontario and Quebec and is based in Toronto.

== Notable incidents and collisions ==
- October 29, 1933: When a bus carrying 25 passengers and a driver collided with a loaded truck north of High River, four passengers died and two were seriously injured.
- February 1936: A car crossed the median near Moyie and collided head on with a bus, which plummeted down a 30-metre (100 ft) embankment. Only the driver and two of the 13 passengers were severely injured.
- August 10, 1943: A logging truck sideswiped a westbound bus near Corra Linn Dam, BC, killing three passengers.
- February 24, 1945: An eastbound bus plunged down a 61.0-metre (200 ft) embankment near Keefers, killing one passenger and breaking the driver's leg.
- October 15, 1946: An eastbound bus carrying 12 people left the road and rolled 23 metres (75 ft) down an embankment one mile west of Spuzzum. Five people, including the driver, were hospitalized.
- November 28, 1963: A cement truck collided with a bus near Gilbert Plains, Manitoba. The truck driver died. The bus driver and a passenger sustained broken bones.
- June 16, 1967: A runaway loaded gravel truck collided head on with an eastbound bus carrying 25 passengers in Rogers Pass (British Columbia). The bus driver, a trainee driver, and three passengers died.
- September 17, 1969: When a northbound bus sideswiped a truck near Spences Bridge, one man died and 17 other passengers were injured.
- August 23, 1971: When a small truck collided with a bus west of Kamloops, BC, one woman died and about 20 other passengers were injured.
- February 17, 1982: Losing control, the driver later died after his bus carrying freight only landed on its side 11 kilometres (7 mi) south of Spences Bridge.
- March 4, 1994: When a tractor trailer skidded into a northbound bus 7 kilometres (4 mi) south of Clinton, British Columbia, dozens of passengers were taken to area hospitals.
- December 23, 2000: An attempted hijacking of a Greyhound Canada bus near Thunder Bay, Ontario left one woman dead and 31 others injured.
- July 30, 2008: Tim McLean, a passenger on an Edmonton to Winnipeg schedule, was decapitated by another passenger near Portage la Prairie, Manitoba. The perpetrator, later identified as Vince Li, was arrested at the scene and charged with second-degree murder, but later found to be incompetent to stand trial due to a possibility of insanity. Greyhound Canada withdrew ads with the slogan There's a reason you've never heard of "bus rage" following the event, citing that the campaign was "no longer appropriate".
- September 21, 2008: A young man was attacked by another passenger on a Greyhound Canada schedule in Northwestern Ontario. Police arrested a 28-year-old man near the town of White River, about 300 kilometres (190 mi) north of Sault Ste. Marie, shortly after the bus driver let him get off at the side of the highway.
- December 16, 2010: A Toronto Transit Commission 505 Dundas streetcar was heading eastbound at River Street when it crashed into a Greyhound Canada bus after running a red traffic signal. 17 passengers, including 4 schoolchildren, received serious, but non-life-threatening injuries.

== See also ==
- Lymbery, Tom (2010). "British Columbia Historical News: Greyhound and Gray Creek". www.library.ubc.ca. 43 (1): 1–2, 23–25 (cover, 21–23).
