= Little Haifa or New Preston St. =

Coordinates: 38.228°N 85.642°W

Little Haifa or New Preston St. (a tribute to Preston St., the original Jewish Enclave and home to two Jewish cemeteries in the Germantown neighborhood in Louisville, Kentucky) are the two nicknames for a large Jewish neighborhood on Dutchman's Lane stretching from Abigail Drive through Almara Circle, Vivian Lane, and Woodluck Avenue.

The small neighborhood, situated between the Highlands and St. Matthews, is the center of Louisville's Jewish communities, especially the Orthodox Jewish community. It is home to Louisville's Jewish Community Center, a number of social service organizations serving the Jewish community. It was formerly the home of Anshei Sfard, Louisville's only Orthodox synagogue, which relocated in 2018. In 2022, the new JCC, the Trager Family Jewish Community Center, will open on land previously owned by Anshei Sfard.

Almara Circle, Vivian Lane, Woodluck Avenue serve as the residential zone for most Jewish homeowners in the area, while most Jewish renters are located in Dutchman's Lane and Abigail Drive.
