= Congregation Adath Israel Brith Sholom =

Reform synagogue in Louisville, Kentucky, US

Congregation Adath Israel Brith Sholom (The Temple)
- Location of the current synagogue in Kentucky

Religion
- Affiliation: Reform Judaism
- Ecclesiastical or organizational status: Synagogue
- Status: Active

Location
- Location: 5101 US Hwy 42, Louisville, Kentucky 40241
- Country: United States
- Interactive map of Congregation Adath Israel Brith Sholom (The Temple)
- Coordinates: 38°17′28″N 85°37′52″W

Architecture
- Architects: 1868, Adath Israel: H. P. Bradshaw; 1905, Adath Israel: McDonald Brothers; J.F. Sheblessy; 1949, Brith Sholom: Walter C. Wagner; Joseph Potts; 1980, Merged: Arrasmith & Rapp; Joseph & Joseph
- Type: Synagogue
- Style: Orientalist (1868); Gothic Revival (1881); Greek Revival (1905); Georgian Revival (1949); Modernist (1980)
- Established: 1976 (merged congregation): 1842 (as Adath Israel); 1880 (as Brith Sholom)
- Completed: Adath Israel: 1849 (Fourth Street); 1868 (Broadway); 1905 (S. Third Street); Brith Sholom: 1881 (First Street); 1903 (Second Street); 1949 (Cowling Avenue); Merged: 1980 (Brownsboro)

Website
- thetemplelouky.org
- Adath Israel Temple
- U.S. National Register of Historic Places
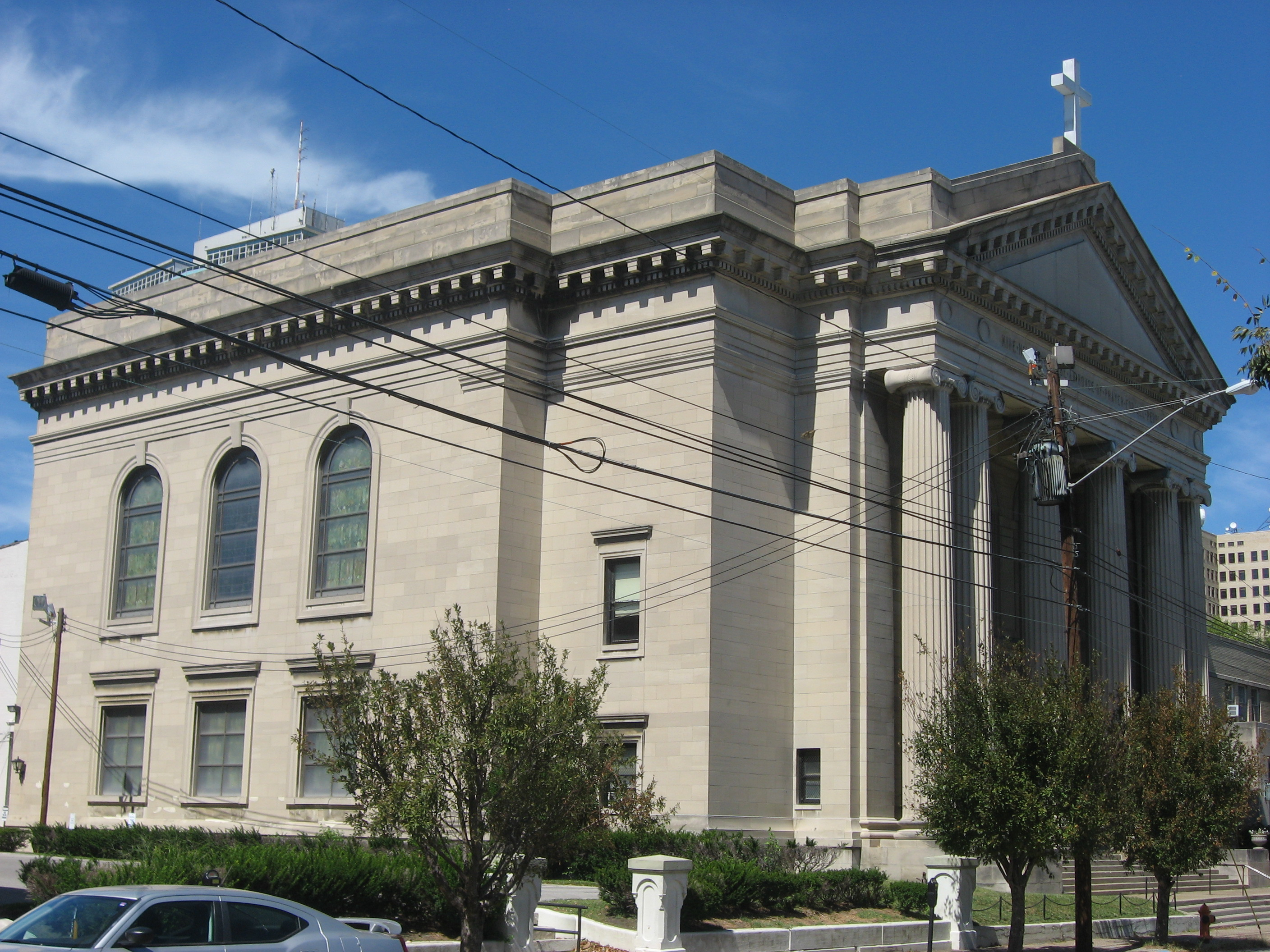
- Façade and southern side of the 1905 synagogue
- Location: 834 South Third Street, Louisville
- Coordinates: 38°14′35″N 85°45′27″W
- Area: 1 acre (0.40 ha)
- NRHP reference No.: 74000882
- Added to NRHP: December 31, 1974
- Adath Israel Cemetery
- U.S. National Register of Historic Places
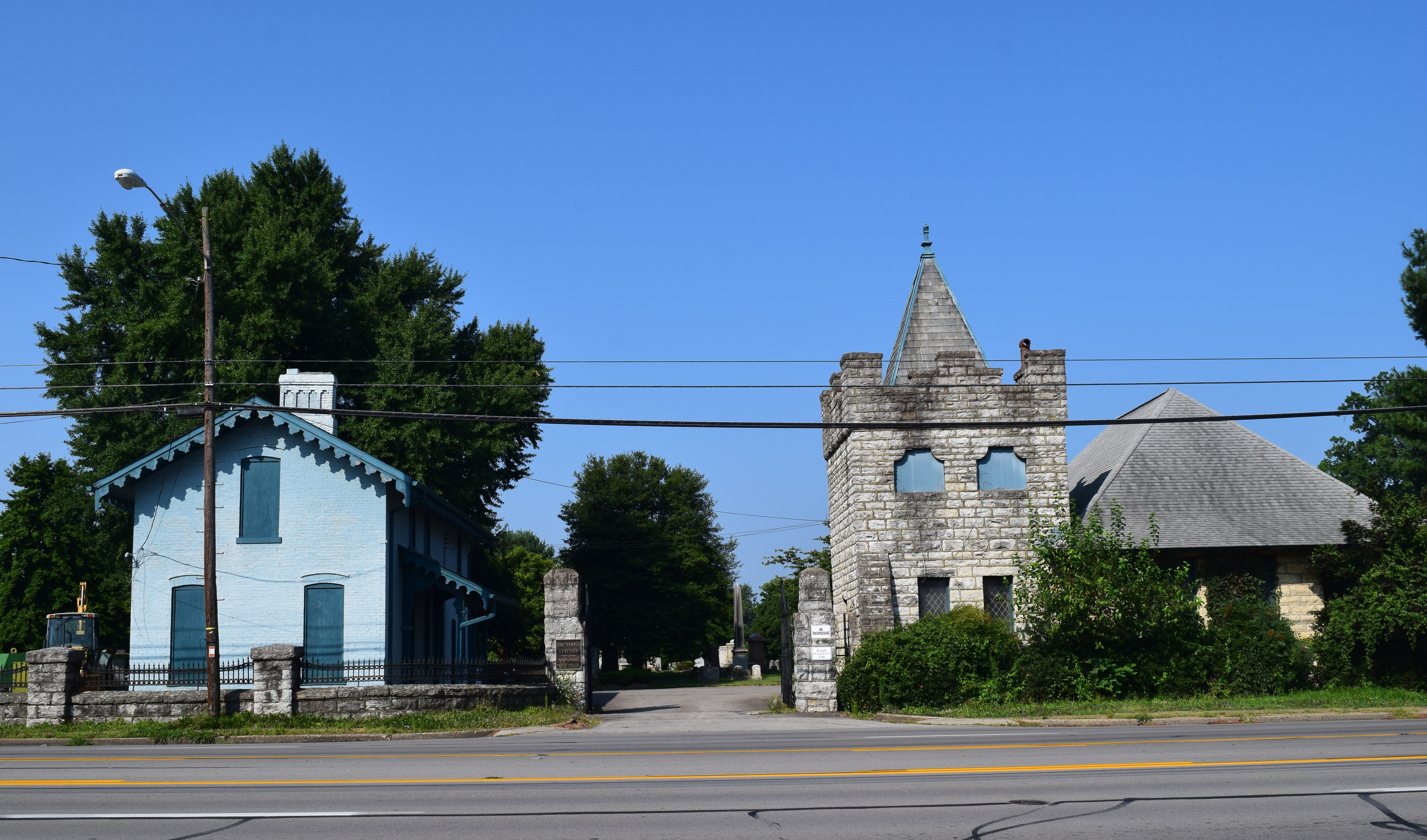
- Entrance to the heritage-listed cemetery in 2021
- Location: 2716 Preston Street, Louisville
- Coordinates: 38°12′38″N 85°44′30″W
- Area: 23 acres (9.3 ha)
- NRHP reference No.: 82002702
- Added to NRHP: June 22, 1982

Congregation Adath Israel Brith Sholom is a Reform Jewish congregation and synagogue located at 5101 US Hwy 42, in Louisville, Kentucky, in the United States.

Originally the Adath Israel Temple, it adopted its current name following a merger, however is more commonly known as The Temple. Prior to merging, the congregations resided in several buildings. Adath Israel Temple's third synagogue building was listed on the National Register of Historic Places in 1974; and the associated cemetery was listed in 1982.

== History ==
The Adath Israel Congregation ("Congregation of Israel"), the oldest in Kentucky, was chartered in 1842 in the Orthodox tradition and has occupied six buildings. It is a founding member of the Union for Reform Judaism.

Brith Sholom ("Covenant of Peace"), Louisville's third oldest synagogue, was organized in 1880. It was established in the Conservative tradition for those wishing to pray in German, rather than the English used in Adath Israel. It joined the Reform movement in 1920.

In 1976, Adath Israel merged with Brith Sholom. This was motivated by the desire of both groups to improve their physical facilities and to relocate to the eastern part of Jefferson County. For a few years after it was organized as Adath Israel Brith Sholom, it held services in the Brith Sholom building. In 1980, the congregation moved into its new Modernist sanctuary on Brownsboro Road.

=== Adath Israel Temple sites ===
The congregation's first synagogue was built in 1849 on Fourth Street, which a fire destroyed in 1866.

In 1868, the congregation built a new temple at Broadway and Sixth Street. The elaborate domed synagogue was created in an Orientalist style that featured twin towers topped by tall domes and a Torah Ark with a horseshoe arch topped by a similar dome. The architect was H. P. Bradshaw. Adolph S. Moses served as rabbi from 1881 to his death in 1902. The building was subsequently repurposed as a Methodist church.

The congregation's third building was informally known as the "Third Street Synagogue". The Greek Revival structure was designed by architects Kenneth McDonald and J.F. Sheblessy and dedicated on June 3, 1906. The building was listed in the National Register of Historic Places in 1974 as a result of the strength and prestige of the architects. In 1977, it was sold to the Greater Bethel Temple, an Apostolic Church.

=== Brith Sholom Temple sites ===
Brith Sholom first building was at First and Walnut Streets, occupied from 1881 and completed in the Gothic Revival style, which it sold to Congregation Anshei Sfard in 1903. The First Street synagogue was destroyed in 1962 to make way for an expressway.

Its second building was at Second and College Streets, completed in 1903, vacated in 1949, and subsequently used as a church. This building was demolished c. 1965.

The congregation's third building was in the Bonnycastle Mansion at Cowling and Maryland Avenues in 1949, completed in the Georgian Revival style by architects, Walter C. Wagner and Joseph Potts. It is the only synagogue built in Kentucky between 1950 and 2000, not designed in the Modernist style. Following the 1976 merger, the merged congregation met at the Cowling Avenue site. The building was subsequently sold and used as a Pentecostal church.

=== Merged site ===
In 1980, the congregation moved to Brownsboro and Lime Kiln Roads with land purchased in 1966. The temple was designed by a joint venture between architectural firms, Arrasmith & Rapp and Joseph & Joseph, as Arnold Judd and Alfred Joseph Jr., senior partners of each firm, were members of the merged congregation.

== Temple Cemetery ==
The Temple Cemetery was formed from the former Adath Israel Cemetery and Brith Sholom Cemetery and comprises 23 acres (9.3 ha) located at 2716 Preston Street, in Louisville. In 1981, the congregation nominated the cemetery for listing on the National Register of Historic Places, that was approved on June 22, 1982. The cemetery is Kentucky's oldest extant Jewish cemetery, laid out by Benjamin Grove in 1876.

=== Notable burials ===
- Henry Berg-Brousseau, transgender rights activist
