= Greyhound Bus Station (Cleveland) =

Bus station in Cleveland, Ohio

Greyhound Bus Station Cleveland, Ohio
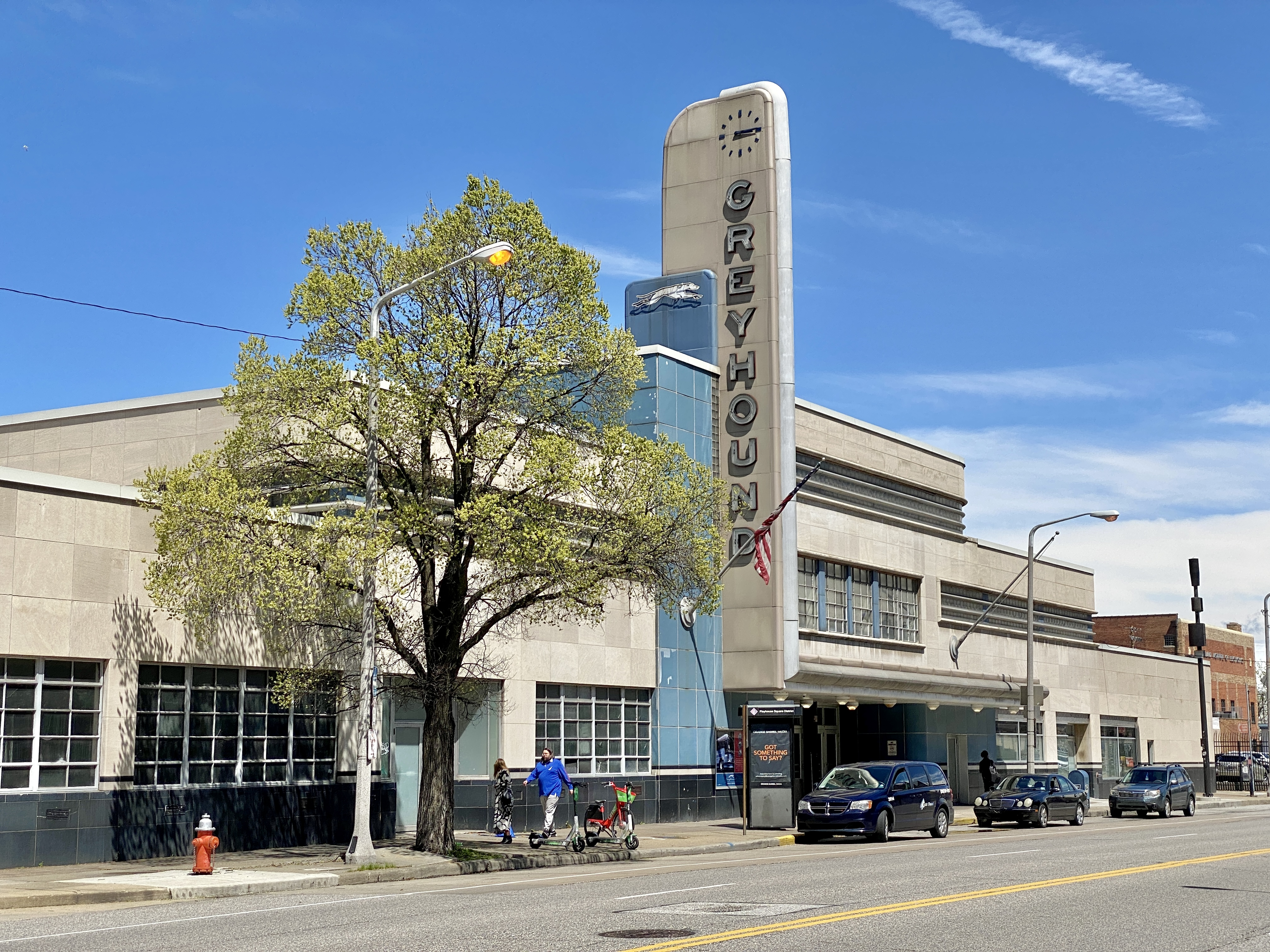
- The Cleveland Greyhound Station in 2023

General information
- Location: 1465 Chester Avenue; Cleveland, Ohio; United States
- Coordinates: 41°30′11.7″N 81°40′56.0″W
- Owner: Playhouse Square

Construction
- Architect: William Strudwick Arrasmith
- Architectural style: Streamline Moderne

History
- Opened: April 1, 1948
- Closed: February 4, 2026

U.S. National Register of Historic Places
- Designated: June 2, 1999
- Reference no.: 91000302
Location

The Greyhound Bus Station was an intercity bus station located in downtown Cleveland in the U.S. state of Ohio. The station was operated by Greyhound Lines and also served Barons Bus Lines and GoBus. It was opened by Greyhound in 1948 to replace an older station, and was designed by William Strudwick Arrasmith in the Streamline Moderne style. The station was listed on the National Register of Historic Places in 1999. The building was sold to Playhouse Square in 2024, and intercity bus service was ended in 2026.

== History ==
Greyhound Lines was formed in 1930 when several intercity bus companies were consolidated into one corporation. It moved a regional office from Chicago to Cleveland the same year. The company constructed its first bus depot in Cleveland at East Ninth Street and Superior Avenue which opened on February 27, 1932. The site of the original depot was to be leased to Greyhound for a period of 15 years.

The Greyhound Bus Station opened on April 1, 1948 with the first buses departing for Painesville, Youngstown and Miami, Florida at just after midnight. As part of the inauguration, an experimental bus designed by Raymond Loewy, the GX-1, was exhibited to the public by Greyhound. The Cleveland station was the first in a series of new bus terminals built by Greyhound as part of a $20 million building campaign.

The station was listed on the National Register of Historic Places on June 2, 1999. The building was determined to be eligible for listing on March 25, 1991, however, a letter of objection was received from the Greyhound subsidiary that owned Greyhounds' terminal buildings. The objection was rescinded by Greyhound in 1999.

In early 2023, the building was sold by the former-Greyhound parent company FirstGroup, along with 32 Greyhound bus terminals, to a real estate investment firm for $1.72 million. The organization managing Playhouse Square, the theater district in downtown Cleveland located across the street from the station, purchased the station building on April 4, 2024 for $3.35 million. It is anticipated that the building would be redeveloped into a mixed-use venue. Greyhound and other intercity bus services were moved to the Brookpark RTA station on February 4, 2026 where a new bus station was constructed by Barons Bus Lines.

== See also ==
- List of Greyhound Bus stations
- National Register of Historic Places listings in Cleveland

== Sources ==
- Wrenick, Frank E (2 December 1990). "Greyhound Bus Station". National Register of Historic Places Registration Form. National Archives and Records Administration. NAID 71987480.
