= Charles Ber Chavel =

Rabbi Charles Ber Chavel (Chaim Dov) (Hebrew: חיים דוב שעוועל; 1906-1982) was a rabbi and scholar who, most notably, published critical editions of medieval Jewish commentators.

== Life ==
Rabbi Chavel was born in Ciechanow, Poland in 1906, and moved to the United States in 1920. He married Florence Krasna (1908–1996) in 1933, and had two children, Cyrella (1936–2000) and Isaac (b. 1939).

He received rabbinical ordination in 1929 from the Hebrew Theological College, and Ph.B. degree from the University of Chicago in 1928. He served as rabbi of Congregation Anshei Sfard of Louisville, Kentucky, from 1930 to 1945, and received his M.A. in Ancient History and LL.B. from the University of Louisville in 1932 and 1938, respectively. He then spent a year as director of synagogue activities of the Union of Orthodox Jewish Congregations of America. From 1946 to 1979 he was the rabbi of Congregation Shaare Zedek of Edgemere, Long Island. He served as a dayyan (judge) on the rabbinical court of the Rabbinical Council of America (RCA), and served as chief editor of the journal HaDarom published by the RCA, from 1957 to 1983.

He received the Rabbi Kook Jewish Book Prize in 1953.

In 1979 he moved to Jerusalem and joined the Board of Directors of the publishers, Mossad HaRav Kook. He died in New York in 1982, and is buried in Beit Shemesh, Israel.

== Hebrew works ==
Most of Rabbi Chavel's books were devoted to critical editions, with annotation and commentary, of classical Jewish commentators on the Bible and Talmud. Unless otherwise indicated, they were published by Mossad HaRav Kook.

The following commentaries were published separately, and the texts were later included in the Mikraot Gedolot edition, Torat Chaim of Mossad HaRav Kook (1986–1993):

- Sefer HaChinuch (1952).
- Nachmanides' (Ramban) commentary to the Torah (1959).
- Rabbi Chananel's commentary to the Torah (1972).
- Rabbi Isaiah di Trani's (Rid) commentary to the Torah (1972).
- Chizkuni's commentary to the Torah (1981).
- Rashi's commentary to the Torah (1982).

Other works on Nahmanides:

- Writings of Nahmanides (Kitvei Ramban) (1963).
- Biography of Nahmanides (1967).
- Nahmanides' Novellae (Chiddushim) on Tractate B. Avoda Zara (1970).
- Responsa of Nahmanides (1975).
- Nahmanides' Critique of Maimonides' The Book of Divine Commandments (Sefer HaMitzvot) (1981).

Other Hebrew Works:

- Rabbeinu Bachya's commentary to the Torah (1966) and his collected writings (Kitvei Rabbeinu Bachya) (1970).
- Divrei David, a supercommentary on Rashi (on the Torah) by the author of the Taz (1978).
- Marginal Notes of R. Akiva Eger on the Talmud (1959–1982). The work fills out marginal glosses of R. Eger (explaining his intention and summarizing subsequent responses to his comments). It covers: Tractate Berakhot, Seder Moed, Seder Nashim, and Seder Nezikin except for tractates Bava Kamma, Bava Metzia, and Bava Batra. The tractates Berakhot, Shabbat, Eruvin appeared in (1959). The rest of the work appeared in the journal HaDarom through the years. Tractates Pesachim-Chagiga were later collected into one volume (1979).

== English Translations ==
Unless otherwise indicated, all translations were published by Shilo Publishing House, New York.

- Maimonides, The Book of Divine Commandments (Sefer Hamitzvot), Soncino Press, London. The first volume was published in 1940, but the plates were destroyed in the bombing of London during WWII.
- The Commandments (Sefer Ha-Mitzvoth of Maimonides) in two volumes (1967), with both being "based throughout on the new Jerusalem Hebrew text" published by Mossad Harav Kook (Jerusalem, 1958). Rabbi Yosef Qafih, who had provided his translation for the 1958 Mossad Harav Kook publication, would later, in 1971, supersede the former edition while faulting that edition for its printing of errors against his agreement and without his knowledge.
- Nachmanides' (Ramban) commentary to the Torah (1971–1976).
- Ramban, Writings and Discourses, (1978).
- Rabbeinu Bachya, Encyclopedia of Torah Thoughts (Kad HaKemach) (1980).
