= Ruth Breton =

American violinist (1900–1993)

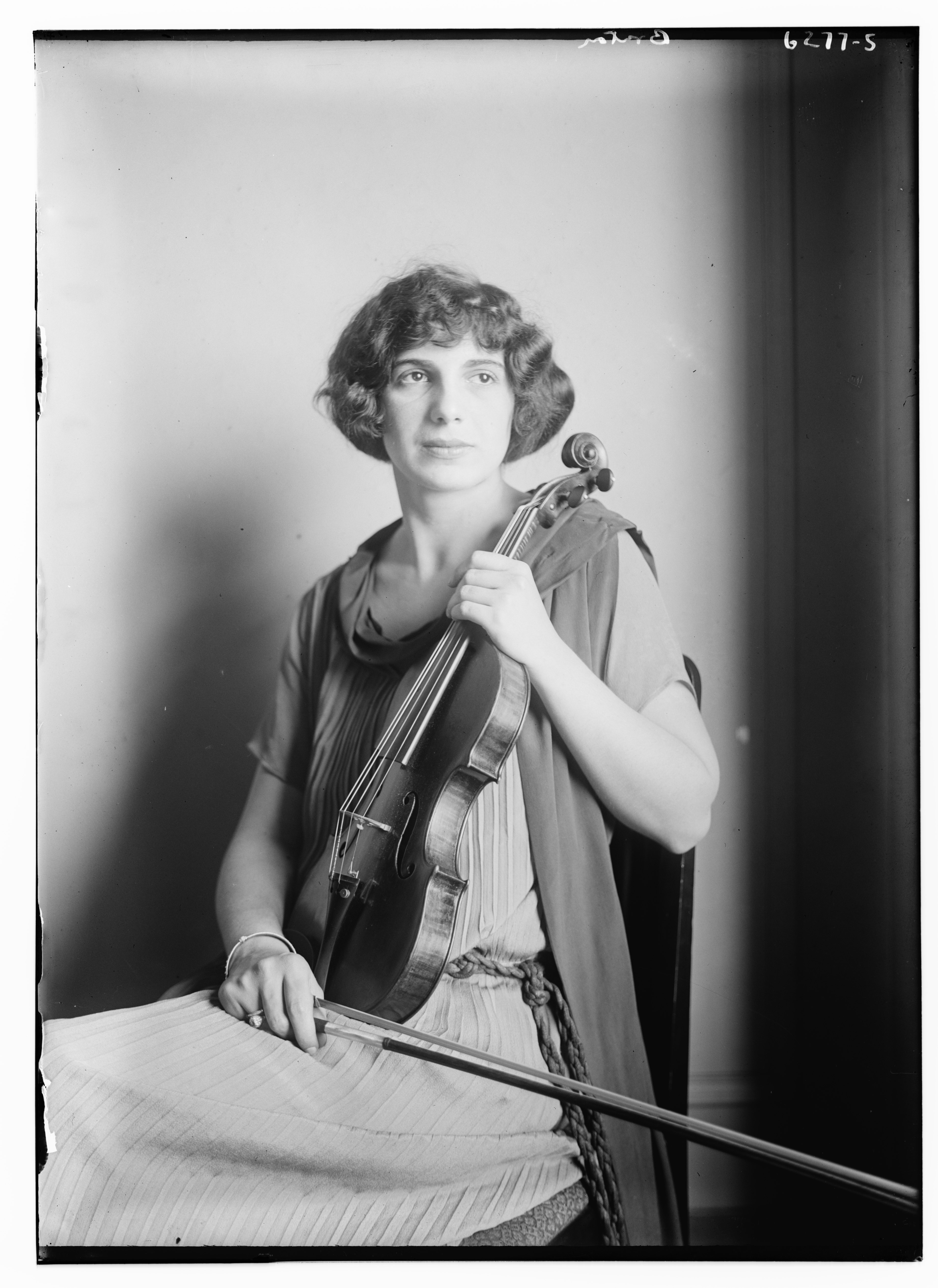
- Ruth Breton, from a 1924 publication
- Born: Ruth Willard Jones; December 5, 1900; Louisville, Kentucky, U.S.
- Died: November 11, 1993 (aged 92); Framingham, Massachusetts, U.S.
- Other names: Ruth Jones Knott
- Occupation: Violinist

Ruth Breton (December 5, 1900 – November 11, 1993), born Ruth Willard Jones, was an American violinist.

== Early life and education ==
Ruth Jones was born in Louisville, Kentucky, the daughter of Oliver Martin Jones and Meta Alfreda Hursh Jones. Her father was a violinist and her mother was a cellist. She graduated from Louisville Collegiate School. She moved to New York after school and studied with Franz Kneisel for a year, before she spent four years training with Leopold Auer. She was one of the students who gave a eulogy when Auer died in 1930.

== Career ==
Breton played historical violins, including the Amati violin known as the "Goding", and a 1685 violin by Antonio Stradivari, known as the "Florentiner". She gave a recital at Aeolian Hall in 1925. In 1926 she gave a joint recital with singer Helen Traubel in Chicago. She "played with an innate sense of form and phrase, a delicacy and charm that alternated with bold, full-toned melody" at another recital at Aeolian Hall in 1927. At Carnegie Hall in 1928, her program included the New York debut of a work by Rebecca Clarke. She gave the first New York performances of works by Willem de Boer and Arthur Benjamin at her Gallo Theatre concert in 1929.

Breton's career continued in the United States and Europe through the 1930s. In 1931 she played on a radio concert from Hartford. Eleanor Roosevelt mentioned hearing Breton perform in a 1937 "My Day" column. In 1938 and 1939, she was a soloist with the Louisville Civic Arts Orchestra. During World War II, she played 112 concerts in 95 days for the USO, at military hospitals, camps, and bases.

== Personal life and legacy ==
Breton married newspaper publisher and banker Richard Gillmore Knott in 1919. They had a daughter, Ruth Gillmore Knott Hapgood. Breton died in 1993, at the age of 92, at her home in Framingham, Massachusetts. A painting of Breton by Kentucky artist Henry Strater is in the collection of the Speed Art Museum. Breton was featured in several episodes of the podcast series Ribbons & Bows.
