= Henry Berg-Brousseau =

American transgender rights activist (1998–2022)

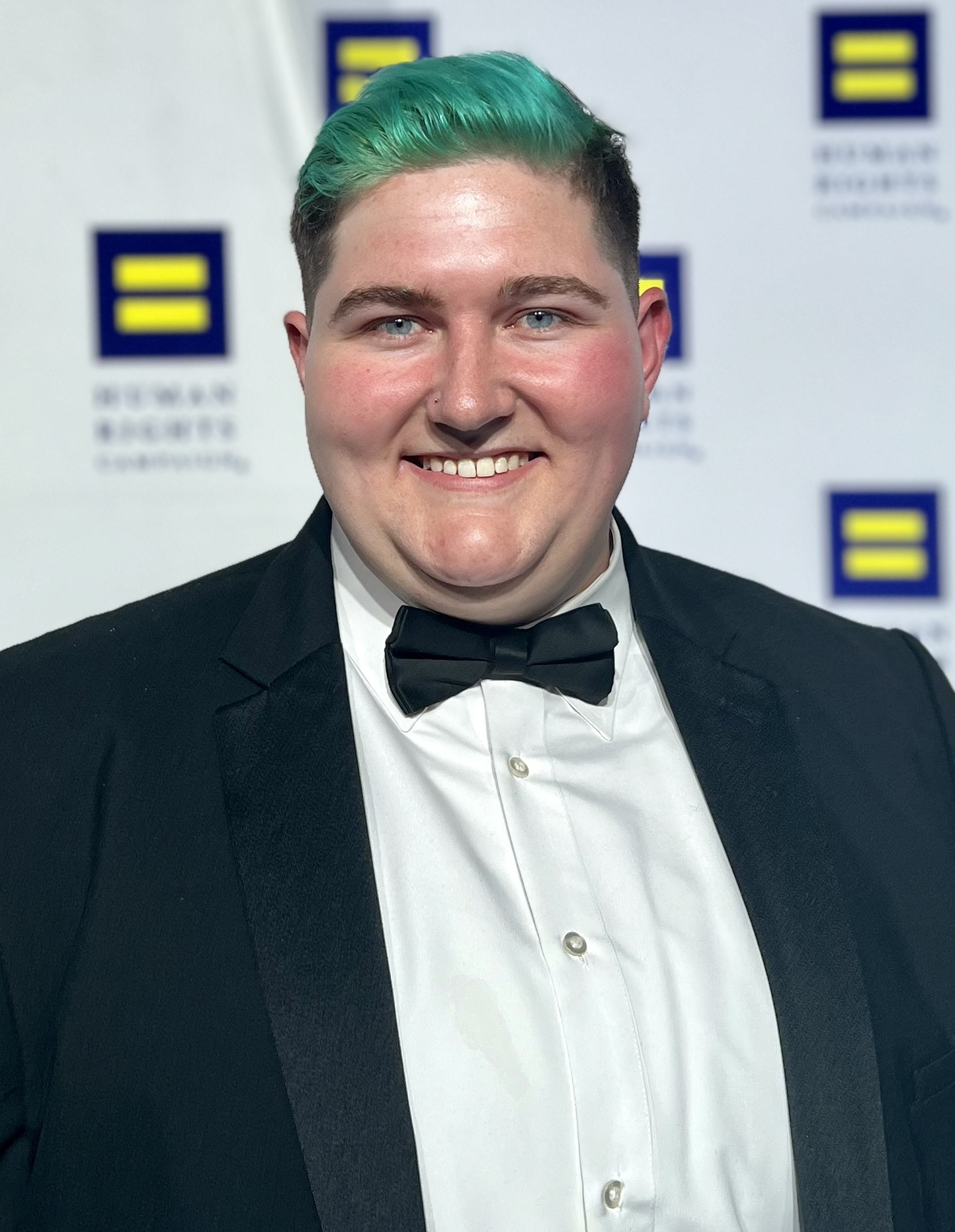
- Berg-Brousseau in 2022
- Born: March 9, 1998; Louisville, Kentucky, U.S.
- Died: December 16, 2022 (aged 24); Arlington, Virginia, U.S.
- Burial place: Temple Cemetery
- Education: George Washington University (BA)
- Occupations: Transgender rights activist; spokesperson
- Employer: Human Rights Campaign
- Political party: Democratic
- Movement: Transgender rights movement
- Mother: Karen Berg

Henry Spilman Berg-Brousseau (March 9, 1998 – December 16, 2022) was an American transgender rights activist and nonprofit spokesperson who is widely known for speaking out against a Kentucky bathroom bill at age 16.

Born and raised in Kentucky, Berg-Brousseau came out as a trans man at the beginning of his freshman year while attending Louisville Collegiate School. After graduating from George Washington University, he worked for the Human Rights Campaign as deputy press secretary for politics. His suicide in 2022 received international media attention and led to the condemnation of anti-trans laws in the United States.

== Early life and education ==
Henry Berg-Brousseau was born on March 9, 1998, in Louisville, Kentucky, to Robert Brousseau and Karen Berg. He graduated from the Louisville Collegiate School in 2016. Berg-Brousseau graduated from the George Washington University in 2021, where he studied political science and history, and also pursued a minor in Jewish studies. During college, he was a founding member of the Alpha chapter of Delta Lambda Phi, a national fraternity for gay, bisexual, and transgender men.

== Achievements ==
In 2015, Berg-Brousseau began interning at the Fairness Campaign, a lobbying and advocacy organization, focusing primarily on preventing discrimination on the basis of sexual orientation and gender identity. He organized a protest against conversion therapy and participated in many discussions around transgender rights at the local and national level.

In February 2015, at age 16, Berg-Brousseau presented a testimony against a Bathroom bill under consideration by the Kentucky legislature and helped prevent its passage. When discussing the bill, he stated:

"When you walk in somewhere where nobody else goes or have to leave class for extra time to walk into the basement, that opens yourself up to not being a normal kid . . . I don’t feel like I should have to change my life to accommodate their hatred."

Portions of his testimony were featured by John Oliver during a segment of his show, Last Week Tonight with John Oliver.

In 2021, during his time with the Human Rights Campaign in Washington D.C., Berg-Brosseau focused on political communication. He followed bills and news headlines related to gender-affirming care, education on gender and sexuality, and restrictions on transgender athletes and their participation in sports.

== Personal life and death ==
Berg-Brousseau was Jewish and practiced Judaism. He was openly gay.

Berg-Brousseau died by suicide in his home in Arlington County, Virginia, on December 16, 2022. His mother, Karen Berg, a member of the Kentucky Senate, commented on his death saying that he, "long struggled with mental illness, not because he was trans but born from his difficulty finding acceptance."

Upon the announcement his death, Human Rights Campaign president Kelley Robinson said in a statement: "We must celebrate his light, and honor him by continuing to fight for full equality for all." Kentucky Representative Daniel Grossberg wrote in a statement on Twitter: "I am terribly saddened to hear of the loss of my very first campaign intern,... Henry was a beacon of light in an otherwise dark world. He was brave. He was bright. He was kind. He fought for a better world. May his memory forever be a blessing."

His funeral service was held at the Herman Meyer & Son Funeral home in his hometown of Louisville, on December 21, 2022. The service was attended by Kentucky Governor Andy Beshear, Congressman-elect Morgan McGarvey, and several members of the Kentucky Legislature. Berg-Brousseau was buried at Temple Cemetery in Louisville.

== Legacy ==
Following his death in 2022, the Delta Lambda Phi Alpha chapter has held an annual drag show in the founder's memory. Serving as a fundraiser, proceeds have been donated to various LGBTQ+ organizations such as The Trevor Project and the Trans Lifeline.
