= Louisville Collegiate School =

Private school in Louisville, Kentucky, U.S.

Coordinates: 38°14′31.3″N 85°42′40.8″W

- Louisville, Kentucky; United States

Information
- Type: Private
- Established: 1915
- Founder: Virginia Perrin Speed
- Headmaster: Dr. Robert Macrae (appointed 2019)
- Faculty: 126
- Grades: Junior kindergarten – grade 12
- Gender: Co-educational
- Enrollment: 804
- Campus: Suburban
- Campus size: 60 acres (240,000 m^{2})
- Colors: Blue and gold
- Mascot: Amazons and Titans
- Nickname: Collegiate, LCS
- Tuition: Junior kindergarten: $14,200; Kindergarten: $17,850; Grades 1–4: $24,100; Grade 5: $26,650; Grades 6–12: $27,500
- Website: louisvillecollegiate.org

Louisville Collegiate School (commonly known as Collegiate) is an independent co-educational day school located in the Highlands neighborhood of Louisville, Kentucky, United States. The junior kindergarten to 12th grade school enrolls 804 students at 2427 Glenmary Avenue.

== History ==
Louisville Collegiate School opened on September 23, 1915, in a house at 512 West Ormsby Avenue. Virginia Perrin Speed and husband William Shallcross Speed were the principal founders of the school.

Collegiate expanded its premises in 1927 to its current location on Glenmary Avenue in the Highlands, just east of downtown Louisville, in what is now the Lower School. Although initially accepting boys in primary grades, it remained traditionally a girls' school until 1972, when the Lower School became co-educational.

In 1980, Collegiate's Board of Trustees implemented co-education in the Upper School. To accommodate increased enrollment, Willig Hall was built in 1983 to house the Upper School. The first co-educational class graduated in 1987.

In 2001, Collegiate launched a campaign to expand its Upper School. The building became a 62,500-square-foot (5,810 m^{2}) structure housing 17 classrooms, seven study areas, three science labs, and two computer labs. Collegiate launched a junior kindergarten in 2008.

== Academics ==
Louisville Collegiate School is divided into a Lower School (junior kindergarten–grade 4), a Middle School (grades 5–8), and an Upper School (grades 9–12). Each division has its own administrative head and core faculty, and many faculty members teach in multiple divisions. Collegiate is the only member of the Global Online Academy (GOA) in the state of Kentucky.

Collegiate's fine arts curriculum for Lower, Middle, and Upper School students includes visual art (drawing, painting, printmaking, photography, 3D sculpture), vocal and instrumental music, drama, and visiting artists.

== Athletics ==
Fall sports

Field hockey, soccer, golf, cross country

Winter sports

Basketball, indoor track, squash, swimming and diving

Spring sports

Crew, lacrosse, tennis, track and field

== Controversy ==
In September 2015, a lawsuit was filed against Collegiate by a student's family who alleged that the school had failed to acknowledge repeated cases of sexual harassment and abuse against an unnamed female student by her male classmate. The plaintiff claimed that the classmate had groped her and made sexual gestures toward her on multiple occasions.

Collegiate demolished Yorktown Apartments, three apartment buildings on its property, in August 2023 in order to construct a parking lot. The school made its plans public in November 2022, and reasoned that the buildings' demolition would be positive, arguing that the apartments were in great disrepair. Collegiate also gave monetary assistance to the Yorktown tenants when they were forced to leave. However, tenants of the apartments protested, stating that the buildings were in poor condition because of the school's mismanagement after buying the property in 2015. Some also protested the demolition of the buildings because of their affordable rent prices, which the city lacks.

== Notable alumni ==
- Henry Berg-Brousseau (2016), transgender rights activist
- Sallie Bingham (1954), author and playwright
- Ruth Breton, violinist
- Tori Murden McClure (1981), first woman to row solo across the Atlantic
- Jane Metcalfe (1979), co-founder of Wired Magazine
