= Greyhound Bus Terminal (Evansville, Indiana) =

- U.S. National Register of Historic Places
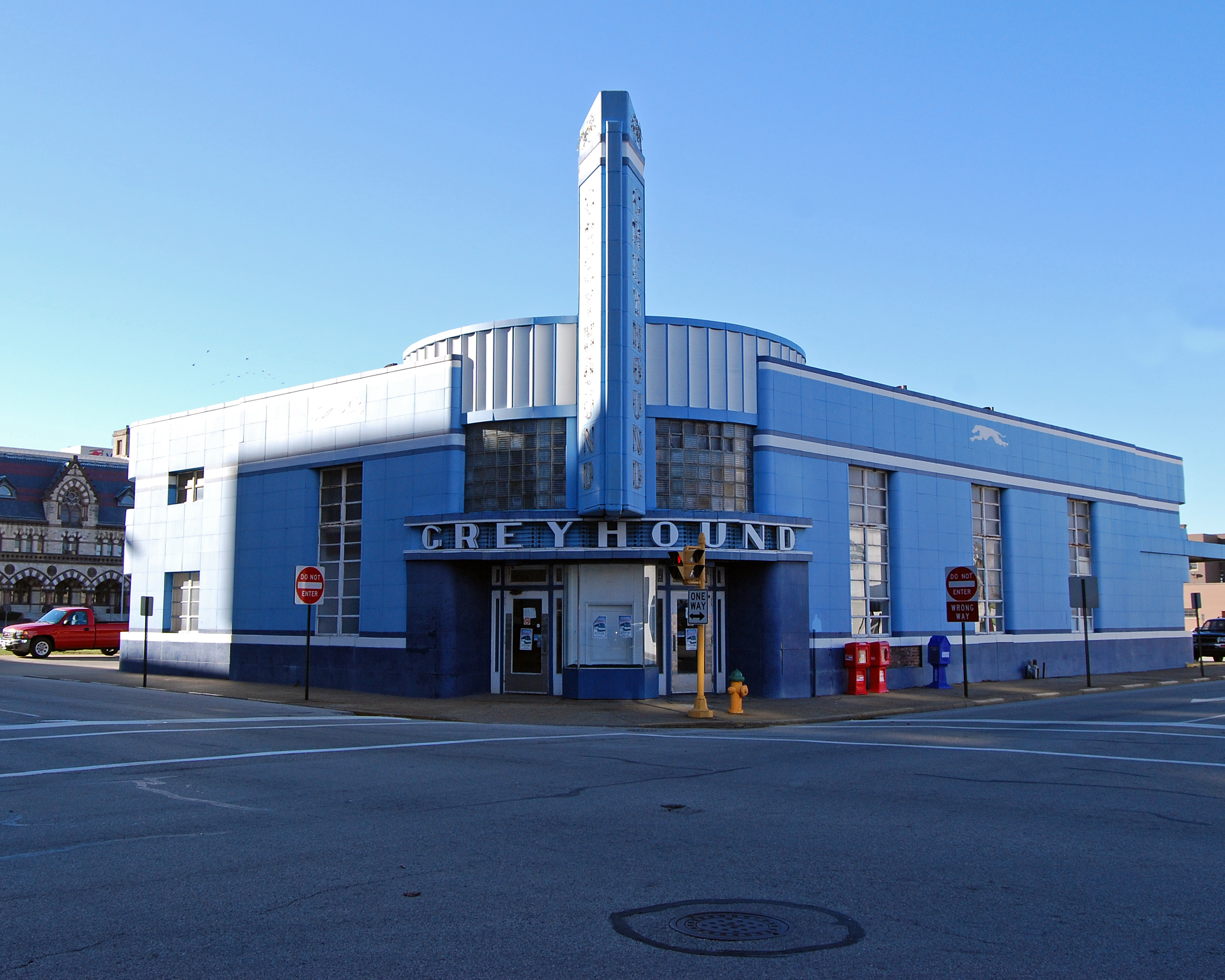
- Greyhound Bus Terminal (December 2008)

- Location within Indiana Location within the United States
- Location: 102 NW. 3rd St., Evansville, Indiana
- Coordinates: 37°58′19″N 87°34′24″W
- Area: less than one acre
- Built: 1938
- Architect: Wischmeyer, Arrasmith, & Elswick; Berendes, Edwin C.
- Architectural style: Streamline Moderne
- NRHP reference No.: 79000048
- Added to NRHP: October 1, 1979

The Greyhound Bus Terminal in downtown Evansville, Indiana, also known as the Greyhound Bus Station, is a Streamline Moderne-style building from 1938. It was built at a cost of $150,000. Its architects include W.S. Arrasmith who designed numerous other Greyhound depots. The terminal, at the corner of Third and Sycamore streets, was listed on the National Register of Historic Places in 1979.

In July 2008, the long-unused bus terminal and its site had been considered in discussions about potential locations for a new arena that would replace Roberts Municipal Stadium. By December, city council approved plans to build the Ford Center in another downtown location.

In December 2011, then Mayor Jonathan Weinzapfel announced plans to turn the adjacent property into Bicentennial Park to celebrate the city's upcoming bicentennial in 2012.

In 2016, a restaurant named Bru Burger opened inside the old terminal.

== Gallery ==
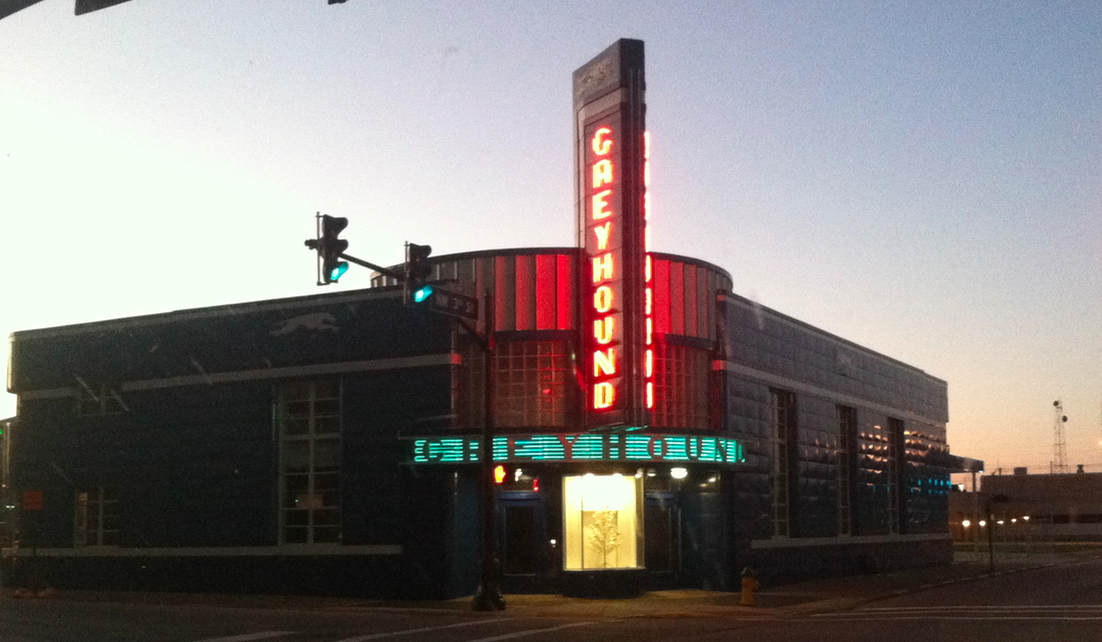
The station in 2016.
