= Old Greyhound Terminal (Washington, D.C.) =

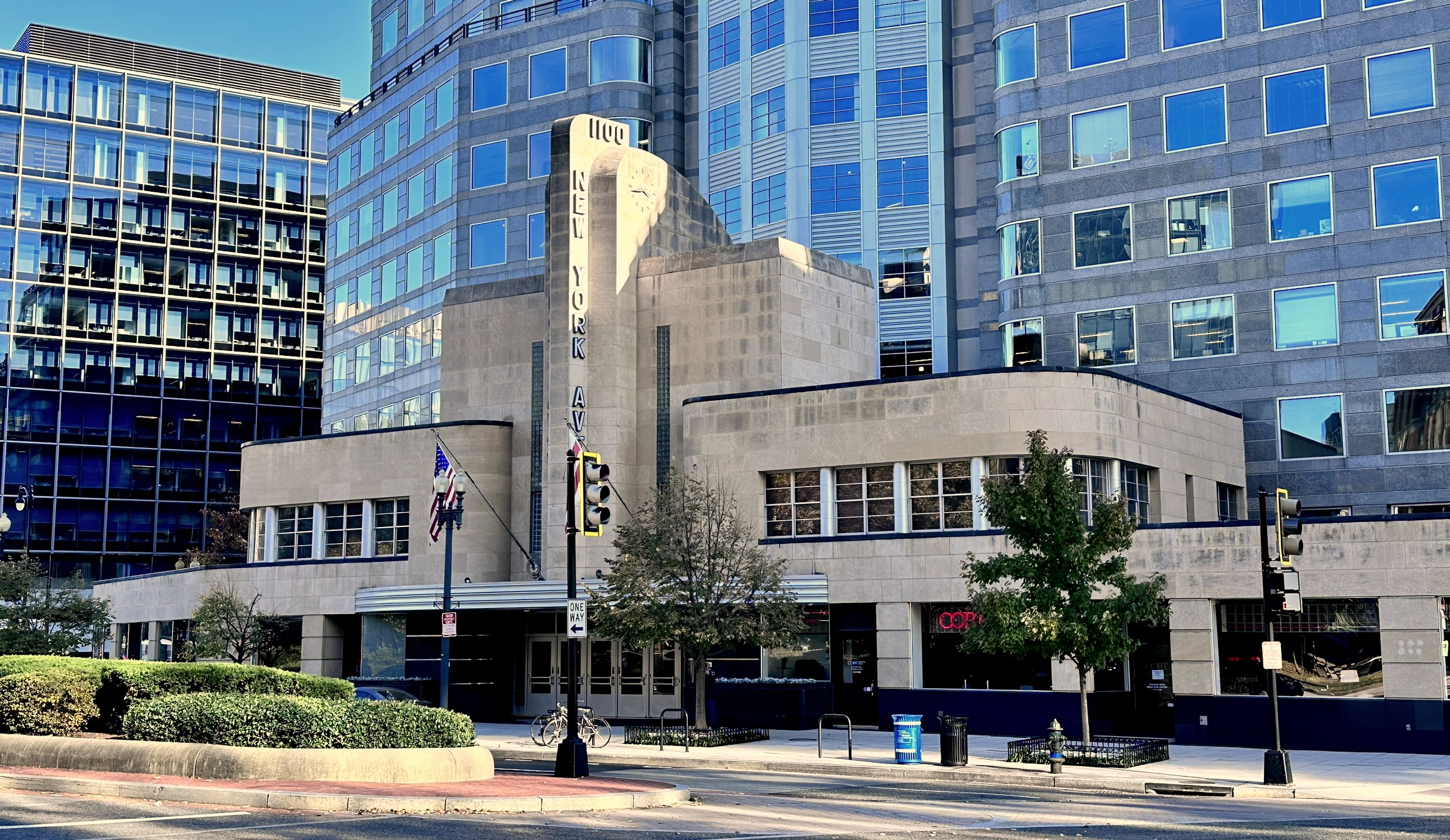
- Interactive map of the Old Greyhound Terminal area

General information
- Type: Bus Terminal
- Location: Washington, D.C., United States
- Coordinates: 38°54′02″N 77°01′39″W
- Construction started: 1939
- Completed: 1940

Technical details
- Floor count: 3

Design and construction
- Architect: William S. Arrasmith

The Old Greyhound Terminal was a bus terminal serving Greyhound Lines located at 1100 New York Avenue NW in Northwest, Washington, D.C. in the United States operating from 1940 to the 1980s. It was used extensively during World War II to transport servicemen, and played a minor role in the Civil Rights Movement. It was saved through the intervention of preservationists. Most of the building was incorporated in the new 1100 New York Avenue high-rise office building when it was built in 1991.

== First terminal ==
In September 1932, a hearing involving the Public Utilities Commission, Several DC Streetcars, the Short Lines and representatives of the Greyhound Lines took place regarding the request for a new Terminal for the bus company on the Northern side of New York Avenue NW between 14th and 15th Street NE. A previous permit had been denied.

The Washington Railway and Electric Company and the Short Lines opposed the project while the Capital Traction Company had no objection on the location of the terminal. The Washington Chamber of Commerce, the Board of Trade and the Merchants and Manufacturers Associations supported the project. A week later a building permit was granted by the Public Utilities Commission to build a terminal at 1403-11 New York Avenue NW with a circular driveway right outside of the border of the city congested zone. However the approval also implemented a limit on the number of arrivals and departures that could take place during peak traffic hours. In June 1933, the terminal started to operate but by 1938, this terminal had been outgrown by the number of buses and a replacement Terminal was needed.

== Design and construction ==
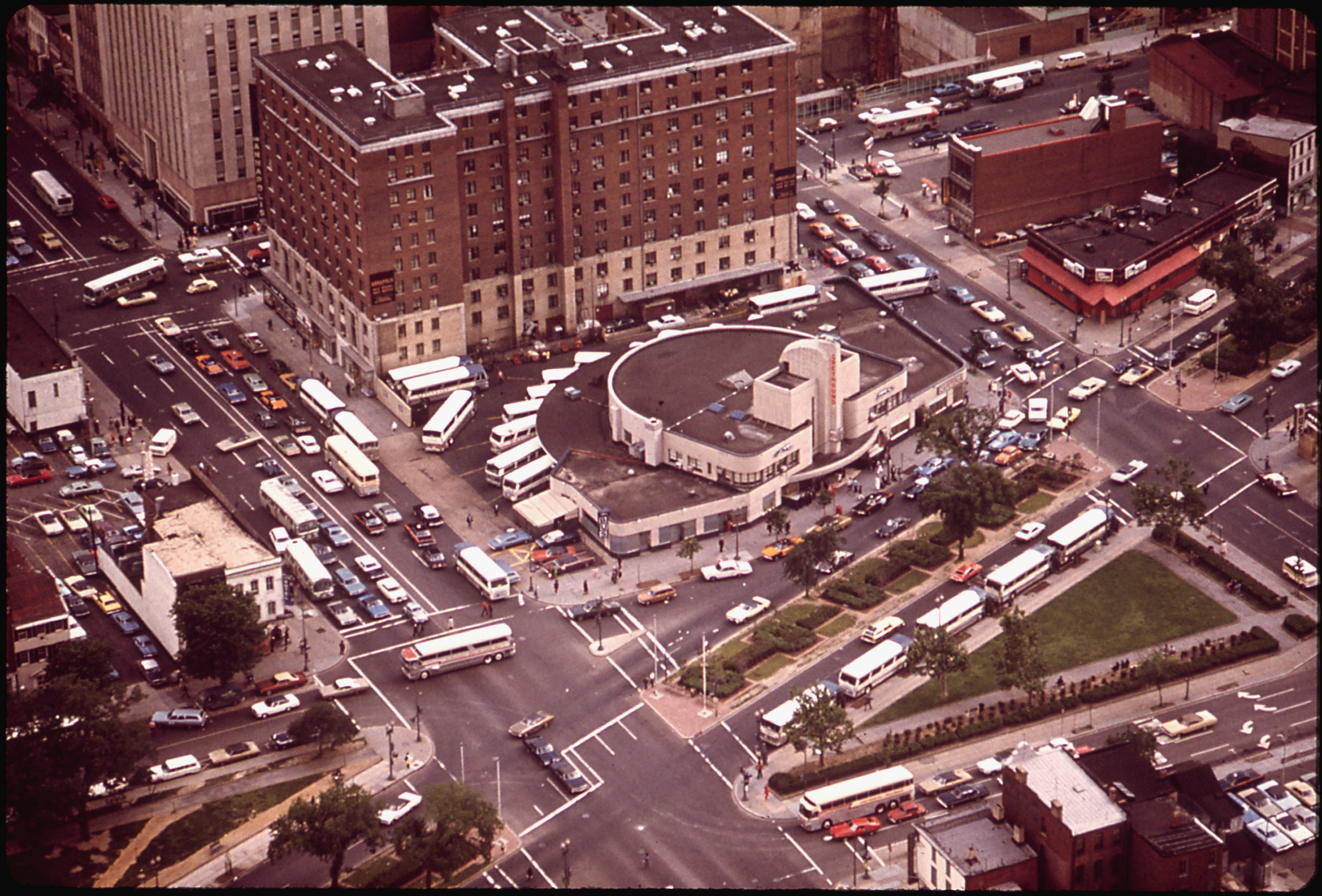
Aerial view, 1973

A plan for a new terminal was announced on December 15, 1938. It was estimated to cost $750,000 and to start in April 1939 with a completion date of November 15, 1939. It would house the buses of the Pennsylvania, Richmond, Capital and Atlantic Greyhound Lines as well as the Corporation managing the terminal and have air-conditioning. The site had previously been occupied by Annapolis Railway which had closed down in 1935. The architects were Wischmeyer, Arrasmith & Elswick of Louisville, KY and Frances P. Sullivan of Washington, DC. The current tenants were given 90-day notices.

On August 10, 1939, it was announced that the old terminal had been leased to Arthur G. Dezendorf who operated a chain of automobile service stations and parking lot. Portions of the building would be rented out and possibly a bowling alley and a large parking garage. The transfer would take place in December 1939 when the Greyhound Lines would move to the new location.

On March 25, 1940, the Greyhound Lines Terminal was officially opened at 1100 New York Avenue NW. This was the Greyhound flagship at the time. The building and land cost $1 million. It was designed by William S. Arrasmith who designed over 50 streamline bus stations in the 1930s and 1940s. The public was invited to attend the grand opening from 4pm to 9pm with entertainment and souvenirs were handed out (the nature of which is not known). A preview for the Greyhound executives was scheduled from 2pm to 4pm.

== Layout ==
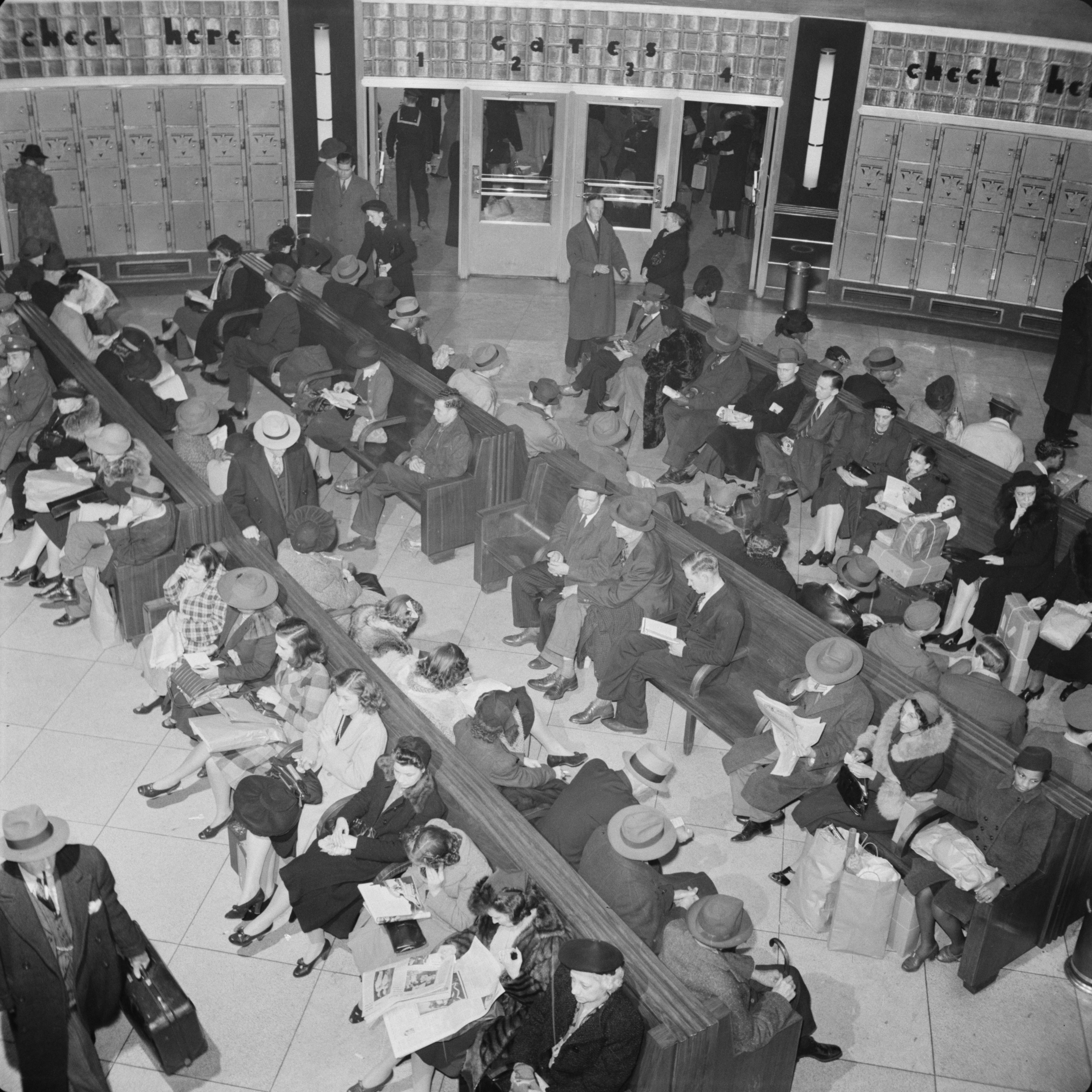
Interior of the terminal, 1941

The building was built of steel and cement. The facade line with Indiana limestone neatly rimmed along the upper edges with glazed black terracotta coping. Aluminum trim and glass-block accentuate the entrance. The main entrance was on New York Avenue NW on the ground floor and opened on a foyer which led to the main waiting room. Eight ticket windows were located on one side of the waiting room to offer quick and efficient service. The air-conditioned waiting room was finished in walnut with benches and trimmed with burnished copper. The floor was covered with checkerboard terrazzo. 24 photo murals showed scenic places in the United States. The domed ceiling was finished in coral buff green and tan as well as touches of burnished copper. On the same floor, visitors could find Highway Tours Inc. as well as the baggage checkrooms, parcel checking facilities, telephone booths, the information desk, a restaurant and a large drug store on the 12th Street NW side of the building.

Directly behind the waiting area, in the rear of the building were the thirteen covered docks used for loading and unloading of arriving and departing buses. Twenty additional spaces were also available to park more buses and a cab stand was to be provided. In the basement, one could find the restrooms for men and women as well as the store rooms used by the restaurant. On the second floor were the executive offices of the Washington branch of the Greyhound Lines, the telephone system and telephone operators as well as the accounting department and the traffic department.

== Early years ==
On March 26, 1940, the first bus entered the terminal at 12:01. All buses from the Greyhound Lines, Peninsula Bus Company and the Blue Ridge Bus Company would arrive and depart from this terminal. All buses entered the terminal from 11th Street NW and exited on 12th Street NW.

In the first few years, the station was to experience heavy use with servicemen and civilians moving all over the country for the war effort in World War II. Sailors, soldiers and airmen were being moved all over the country. Greyhound Lines played an important role in the war effort due to rationing of gas and rubber and advertised it.

On July 31, 1945, an altercation involving two men took place in the waiting room of the terminal. A man identified as John Velardi, 39, from Newark, NJ shot another man identified as Carl Steele, 29, from Washington, DC and then shot himself. The victim took a taxi to the hospital and survived while the shooter died at the hospital from his wounds. It was ruled as suicide. While it was not clear why the altercation took place, it appeared that the shooter did not have any previous record but had drinking heavily, was separated from his wife and a son who was a sailor was missing in the Pacific.

== Freedom Ride 1961 ==
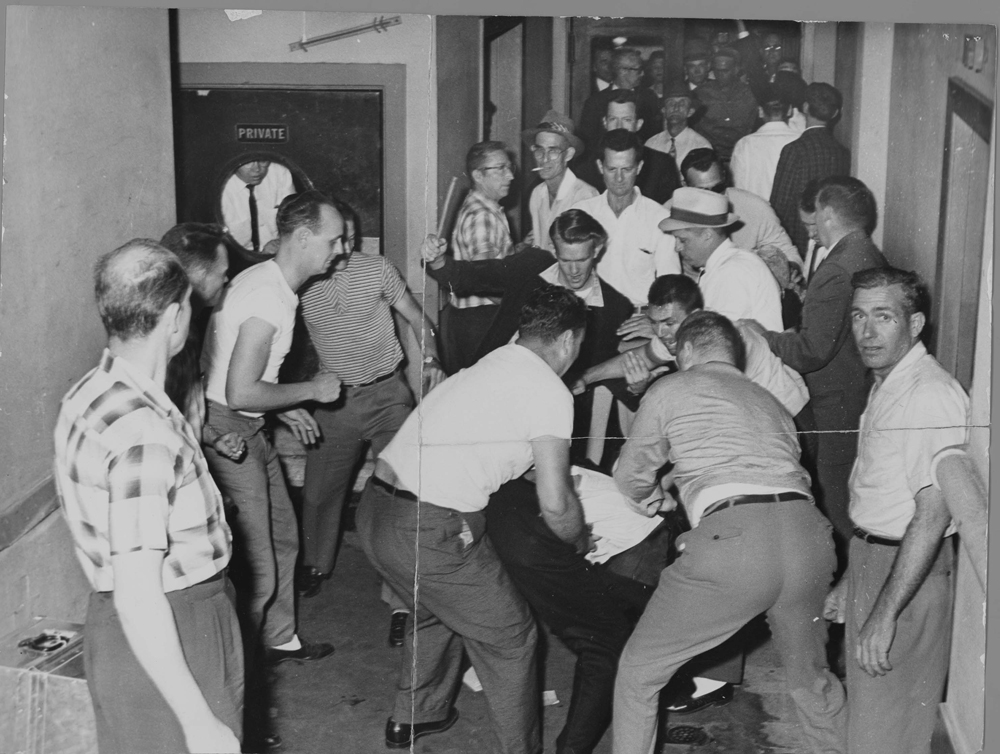
Freedom Riders brutally mobbed in Birmingham, Alabama in 1961. Picture recovered by the FBI.

The terminal was the departure point for the Freedom Ride 1961 on board a Greyhound bus. On May 4, 1961, thirteen black and white men and women aged 18 to 61 divided into two mixed groups boarded a Trailways bus (from the Trailways Terminal located a block away) and a Greyhound bus (from this terminal) in Washington, DC to begin a two-week trip into Virginia, North Carolina, South Carolina, Georgia, Alabama, Mississippi and Louisiana. They planned on arriving in New Orleans, Louisiana on May 17, 1961.

This trip was called "Freedom Ride 1961" and was sponsored by the Congress of Racial Equality (CORE). It was inspired by the "Journey of Reconciliation" undertaken in 1947 by eight black men and eight white men. The 1961 trip was to test the non-enforcement of the Supreme Court of the United States decisions Morgan v. Virginia (1946) and Boynton v. Virginia (1960) which ruled that segregated public buses were unconstitutional. The Southern states had ignored the rulings and the federal government did nothing to enforce them.

The Freedom Riders' tactics for their journey were to have at least one interracial pair sitting in adjoining seats, and at least one black rider sitting up front, where seats under segregation had been reserved for white customers by local custom throughout the South. The rest of the team would sit scattered throughout the rest of the bus. One rider would abide by the South's segregation rules in order to avoid arrest and to contact CORE and arrange bail for those who were arrested.

The participants were all volunteers and did not encounter any issues on their departure from the Greyhound and Trailways Terminals in Washington, DC. They encountered some small incidents in Virginia and North Carolina and John Lewis was attacked in Rock Hill, South Carolina. However, in Birmingham and Anniston, Alabama, extensive violence took place which made international news. With the support of local authorities, the Ku Klux Klan organized violence against the group. The Greyhound bus was attacked and firebombed and both groups were beaten by the mobs. This trip played a significant role in the Civil Rights Movement.

== Decline ==
By the 1970s, the terminal had lost most of the elegance and charm of the 1940s. Bus transportation had lost its glamour and the station reflected this. This is how a journalist from the Washington Post described the terminal in 1973:

It's that bus station smell. It hits you just past the fingerprinty glass doors, just one step into the waiting room ... - the stale, sweet, sooty urban smell of cigar smoke, old sweat and carbon monoxide; the tart, grimy smell of winos, and the starchy air of the cafeteria, like the mess hall of a troop ship, with that same hourless quality of mass travel anywhere in America ...
Same smell of any bus station, same air-brake sighs and diesel groans, same crowd in the waiting room, slouched in the plastic seats with the bolted-on TV sets that nobody watches.

The population has also changed. While there are still some travelers and servicemen, there are also many locals trying to earn some money legally and illegally. Hustling, drugs and homelessness were major issues and it impacted the safety of passengers. Guards and police officers were on duty to keep order the terminal was in decline.

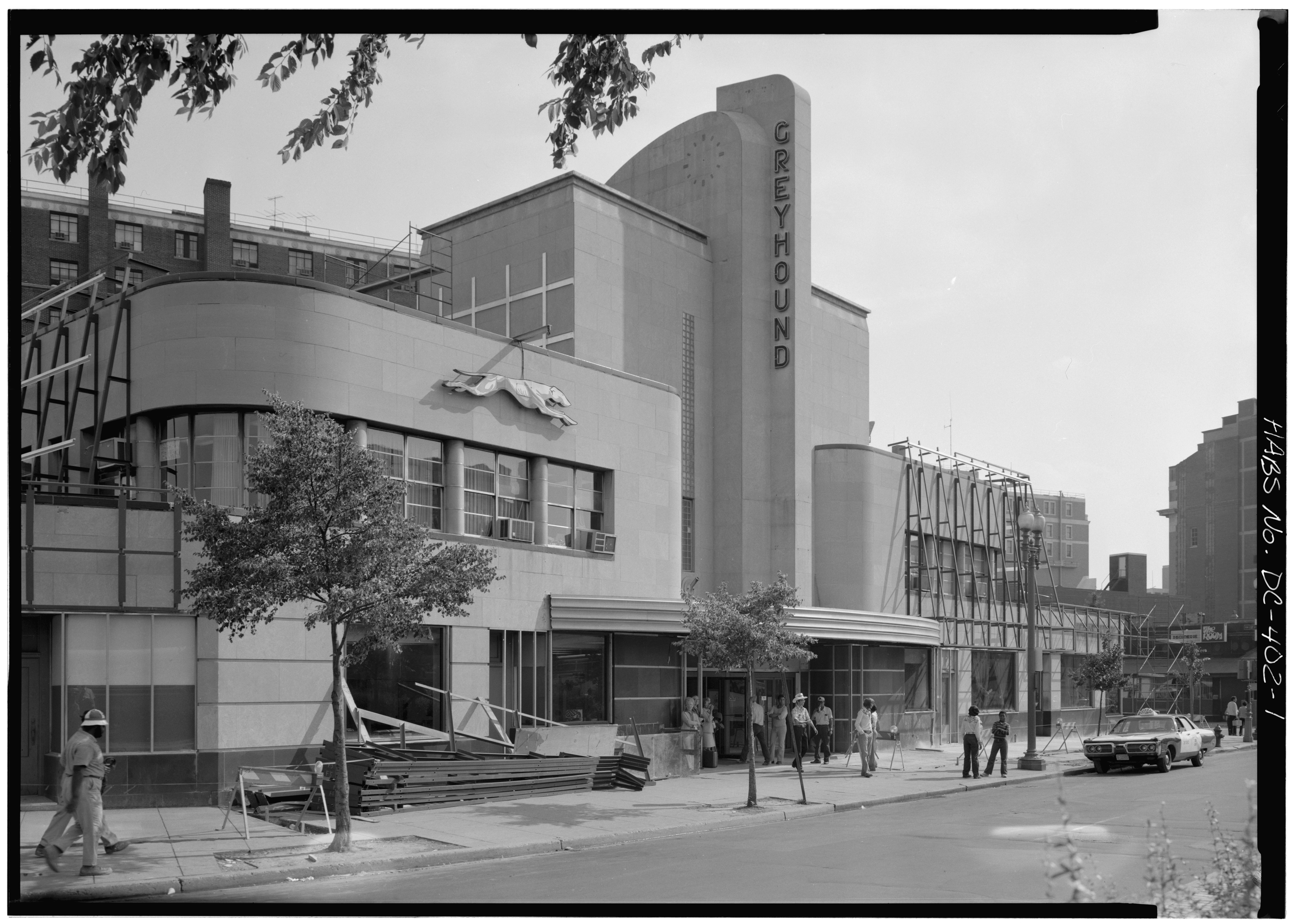
The main entrance during the 1976 remodeling

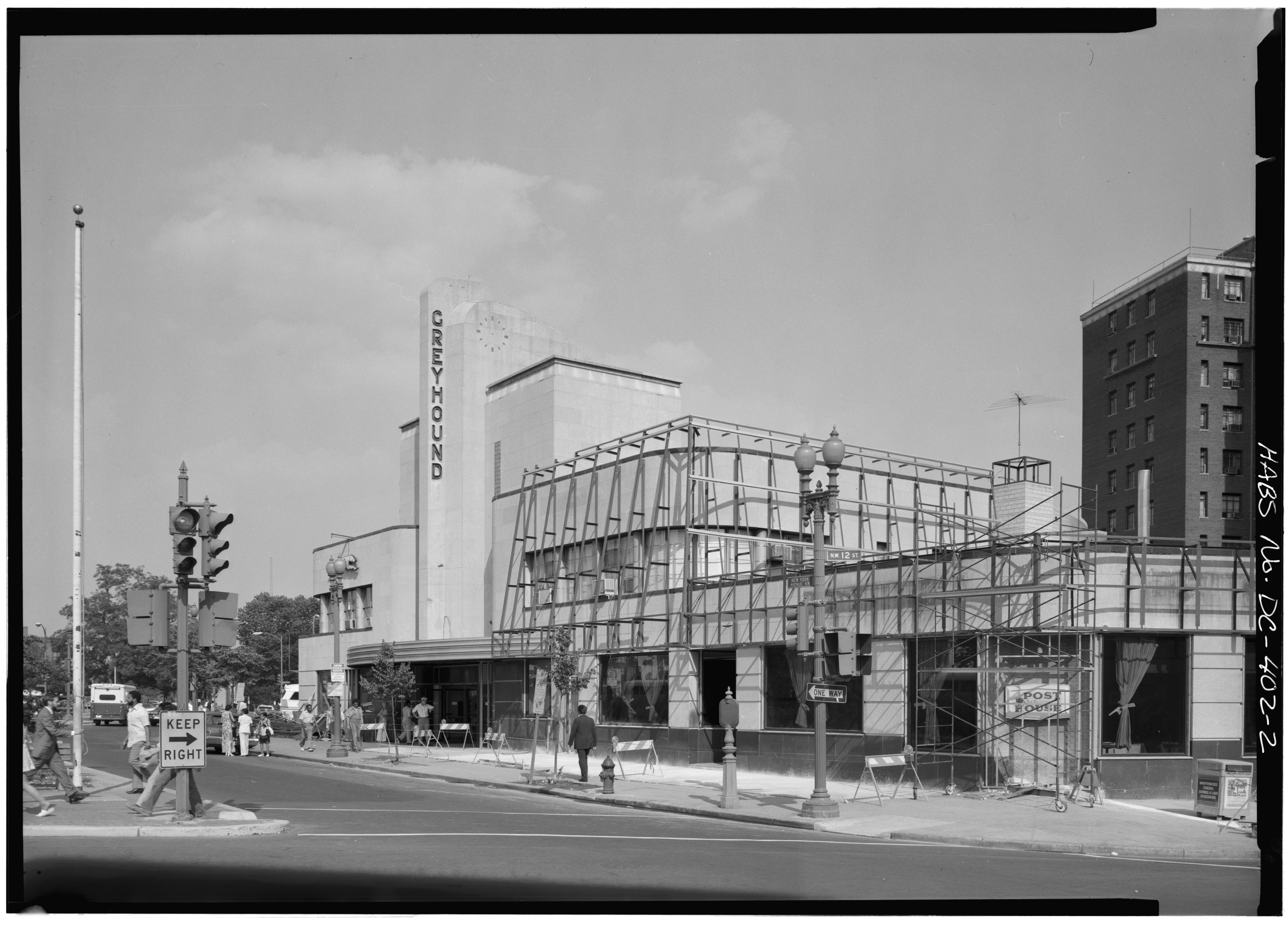
North front and west side during the 1976 remodeling

On September 28, 1972, a bomb made of 2 to 2 1/2 pounds (0.91 to 1.13 kg) of dynamite attached to a clock was left in the terminal. An anonymous phone call was placed at 9:45am announcing that they had placed a bomb in the terminal. After arriving on site, DC police searched but did not find anything and left. A second phone call came in at 10:50am and informed the staff that it was in a locker. The police returned with a dog trained in detecting explosives and using a stethoscope, the locker was found on the west wall. The locker was pried open and the bomb found at 11:15am.

In the summer of 1974, the Greyhound Lines were ordered by the city to clean the bathrooms. It followed an inspection on July 30, 1974, by the DC Environmental Health Administration based on a consumer complaint. Flies, roaches, broken toilet seats, broken trash containers, windows with no screens, absence of paper towels and general uncleanliness were witnessed. The company was given five days to start the work and two weeks to complete all repairs.

In 1976, Greyhound Lines decided to remodel the building to make it fit more in the modern downtown Washington, DC was becoming. It was decided to box up the art deco building. Architect Gordon Holmquist was tasked with the job. The remodel would install concrete asbestos panels and a metal mansard roof around the building. The entire remodel cost $1 million.

By 1978, it was clear that the terminal was reaching the end of its life as a bus terminal. It was suffering from its age, its design which did not work anymore with so many people present and crime was a major issue in the area. The future seemed to be in the vicinity of the train station. The association with Union Station had been proposed by the Department of Transportation back in 1974 at a cost of $50 million but had been put on hold as Congress had not acted on this proposal. While Congress was attempted to help Union Station recover from the National Visitor Center failure and the lack of parking there, adding a bus terminal in Union Station was not on the agenda but both Greyhound Lines and Trailways were in talks to get closer to the Station.

On June 2, 1981, Greyhound Lines announced a multi-million land swap with developer Morton Bender in the presence of Mayor Marion Barry. The developer would build a new terminal at 90 K Street NE, a block from Union Station and he would gain the old terminal which was not located in a prime location downtown. Prices had gone up rapidly in 1980 in the vicinity of New York Avenue NW. The new terminal would be twice the size of the old terminal but the city would have a say in how the land would be developed as it was located in an urban renewal area. It was hoped construction would be completed by the end of 1982. The old location was valued at between $6.5 million and $19 million for the 32,000 square-foot lot. The developer did not have any precise plans for the old terminal.

It was rumored that Trailways was also working on moving closer to Union Station. The Trailways Bus Terminal had been a neighbor of the Greyhound terminal since the 1950s at the corner of 12th Street NW and New York Avenue NW. On July 20, 1982, it was announced that they were also moving to the corner of First Street NE and L Street NE, a block away from the new Greyhound Terminal near Union Station.

== Preservation ==
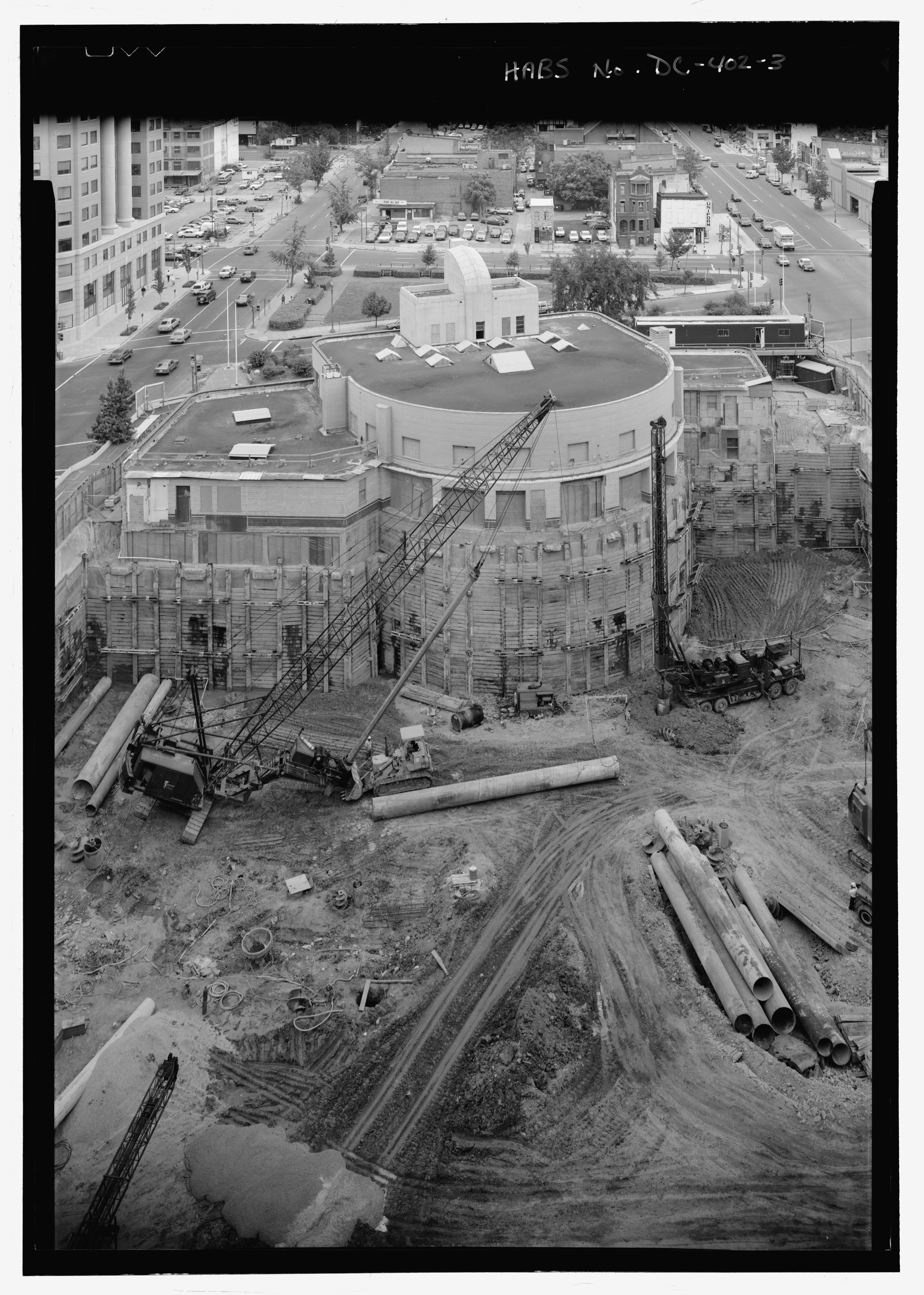
Rear view of the building after excavation.

By 1987, the building and the land were owned by Carlyle Associates of New York. They wanted to develop a 12-story building on the site which would have led to the Art Deco building to be demolished. The 1940s architecture was still covered with the panels from 1976 and it was unclear how the old facade had been preserved under the asbestos panels and the metal cladding. Preservationists had mobilized to get the structure designated as a historic landmark to protect it.

On January 24, 1987, the D.C. Historic Preservation Review Board voted unanimously to designate the old Greyhound Terminal a historical landmark in spite of the fact that Art Deco details were covered and the condition unknown. It was the first time such a decision was made and it was a national precedent for the preservation of historic buildings across the United-States.

In 1988, the developers and the future owners of the building agreed to a 10% reduction of the office space. This allowed the entire terminal to be saved and to serve as the entrance and lobby of the new 1100 New York Ave.

On February 1, 1989, the 1976 remodel was finally removed and it appeared that the art deco details had been preserved, including the two flags on the front of the building. It was cause for celebration with a 1973 Greyhound bus brought in for the occasion. The entire building would be restored and the history of the building put forward.

The 12-floor building was designed by Keyes Condon Florance, completed in 1991 and rises to 156 feet (48 m). The Greyhound name and the running hound logo were removed and replaced with 1100 and New York Ave but the clock remained. The office structure was built where the bus docks and parking once stood right behind the waiting area. A small exhibit on antique buses is located in the north lobby.

== See also ==
- Greyhound Lines
- William Strudwick Arrasmith
- Freedom Riders
- Congress of Racial Equality (CORE)
- Racial segregation in the United States
- List of tallest buildings in Washington, D.C.
- New York Avenue (Washington, D.C.)
