= Anshei Sfard (Louisville, Kentucky) =

Orthodox synagogue in Kentucky

- Location in Kentucky

Religion
- Affiliation: Orthodox Judaism
- Rite: Nusach Ashkenaz
- Ecclesiastical or organizational status: Synagogue
- Leadership: Rabbi Simcha Snaid
- Status: Active

Location
- Location: 2904 Bardstown Road, Louisville, Kentucky 40205
- Country: United States
- Interactive map of Anshei Sfard
- Administration: Orthodox Union
- Coordinates: 38°13′35″N 85°38′53″W

Architecture
- Established: June 1893 (as a congregation)
- Completed: 1903 (South First Street); c. 1957 (near Community Center); 2019 (Dutchman's Lane); 2022 (Bardstown Road)

Website
- ansheisfard.com

Anshei Sfard is an Orthodox congregation and synagogue located at 2904 Bardstown Road, in Louisville, Kentucky, in the United States. Affiliated with the Orthodox Union, the synagogue offers Shabbat and Yom Tov services. Prayer services are conducted in Nusach Ashkenaz.

== History ==
The congregation was founded by a group of Russian Jewish immigrants in June 1893. In 1897 and 1898 it occupied a private home owned by Jacob Brownstein on Eighth Street, and for the next few years met in a three-story building at 716 W. Walnut Street (now called Muhammad Ali Boulevard). In 1903 it purchased the former B'rith Sholom synagogue at 511 South First Street. This building no longer exists, but it was located at a spot that would be across First Street from what is today The Brown School. The synagogue was forced to move due to the construction of the I-65 interstate highway. The synagogue purchased a 17.5 acres (7.1 ha) lot adjacent to the Jewish Community Center and held its groundbreaking ceremony in April 1957.

In 1971 Anshei Sfard absorbed another Orthodox congregation, Agudath Achim, bringing its membership up to 300 families. When another Orthodox congregation, Keneseth Israel, became Conservative in 1994, Anshei Sfard remained as the only Orthodox congregation in Louisville.

Beginning in May 2019, the synagogue rented space from Shalom Towers, situated behind the synagogue's previous location which was sold to the Jewish Community of Louisville. Congregation Anshei Sfard continues to have daily services in its new location under the leadership of Rabbi Simcha Snaid.

In 2022, the synagogue announced that it was moving to a new leased location at 2904 Bardstown Road.

== Rabbinic leadership ==
In 1903 the Orthodox synagogues in Louisville, under the umbrella of a Vaad HaEr (community council), hired a chief rabbi to act as spiritual leader for all of the city's synagogues, in addition to supervising kashrut, a mikveh, and a Talmud Torah. In the 1910s Anshei Sfard hired its own rabbi, Rabbi Z. Klavansky.

From 1930 to 1945 the congregation was led by Rabbi Charles Chavel, who went on to produce acclaimed critical editions of classical Jewish commentators on the Bible and Talmud. He was succeeded by Rabbi Solomon Roodman, who served from 1946 to 1989. Rabbi Avrohom Litvin took the helm in 1989. Rabbi Litvin resigned in 2013.

The next designated spiritual leader, was Rabbi Dr. Joshua Golding, a professor of philosophy at Bellarmine University, specializing in philosophy of religion and Jewish philosophy.

Rabbi Simcha Snaid has served as the senior rabbi since 2016.

== See also ==
- Religion in Louisville, Kentucky
