= William Strudwick Arrasmith =

American architect

- Born: July 15, 1898; Hillsboro, North Carolina, U.S.
- Died: November 30, 1965 (aged 67); Louisville, Kentucky, U.S.
- Education: University of North Carolina; University of Illinois at Urbana–Champaign (BS)
- Occupation: Architect
- Spouse: Elizabeth Beam
- Children: 1

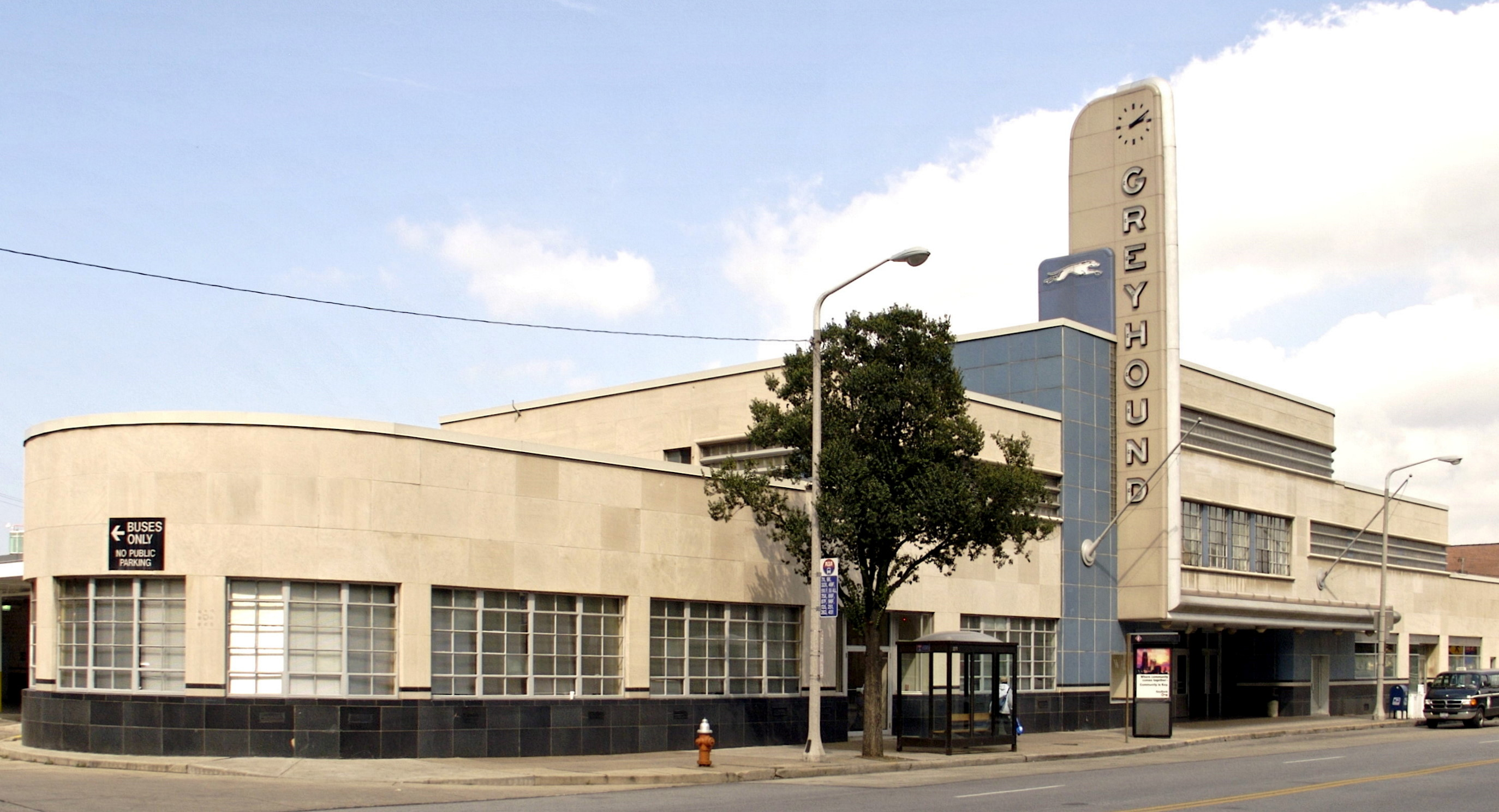
Cleveland Greyhound bus station by William Strudwick Arrasmith, 1948

William Strudwick Arrasmith (July 15, 1898 – November 30, 1965) was an American architect known for his designs for Greyhound bus stations in the Streamline Moderne style popular in the 1930s and 1940s. Among the over 60 stations he designed are the Cleveland Greyhound Bus Station (1948), the Montgomery, Alabama, Greyhound Bus Station (1951), and the Evansville, Indiana, Greyhound Bus Terminal (1938) which are listed on the National Register of Historic Places.

== Early life and family ==
William Arrasmith was born on July 15, 1898, to Thomas and Mary Strudwick at Hillsboro, North Carolina, in the United States. He studied at the University of North Carolina and graduated from the University of Illinois at Urbana–Champaign with a bachelor of science degree in architecture in 1921.

He met his future wife, Elizabeth "Betty" Beam, at Illinois. They had a daughter, Anne.

== Career ==
Arrasmith moved to Louisville, Kentucky, in 1922 where he worked with Fred Morgan, E.T. Hutchings, and Brinton Davis. In 1929 he went into partnership with Herman Wischmeyer as Wischmeyer, Arrasmith, and Elswick. The firm's notable buildings included the Federal Land Bank and the Louisville Scottish Rite Temple (on which Arrasmith is not credited). He was later in partnership with Bill Tyler as Arrasmith & Tyler which later became Arrasmith & Judd and then Arrasmith, Judd, Rapp & Associates. As of 2015 the firm was trading as Arrasmith, Judd, Rapp, Chovan, Inc.

He was known for his designs for Greyhound bus stations in the Streamline Moderne style that was popular in the 1930s and 40s. His first design for the company was a terminal in Louisville that opened in 1937. He also designed stations for the company in Columbus, Dayton, Washington, D.C., and Baltimore. Among the prime examples of his work is the Cleveland Greyhound Bus Station (1948) which is on the National Register of Historic Places along with eight of his other station designs. In total he designed over 60 stations for the company.

Other work by Arrasmith in the Louisville region included the Methodist Evangelical Hospital, the Police School, the science building and medical apartments for the University of Louisville, the 800 Apartments Building, Kentucky Fairgrounds, Kentucky Hotel, Byck's Department Store (St. Matthews and 4th Street), Kentucky State Reformatory (1939), and buildings for Western Kentucky University.

== Buildings designed by W.S. Arrasmith ==
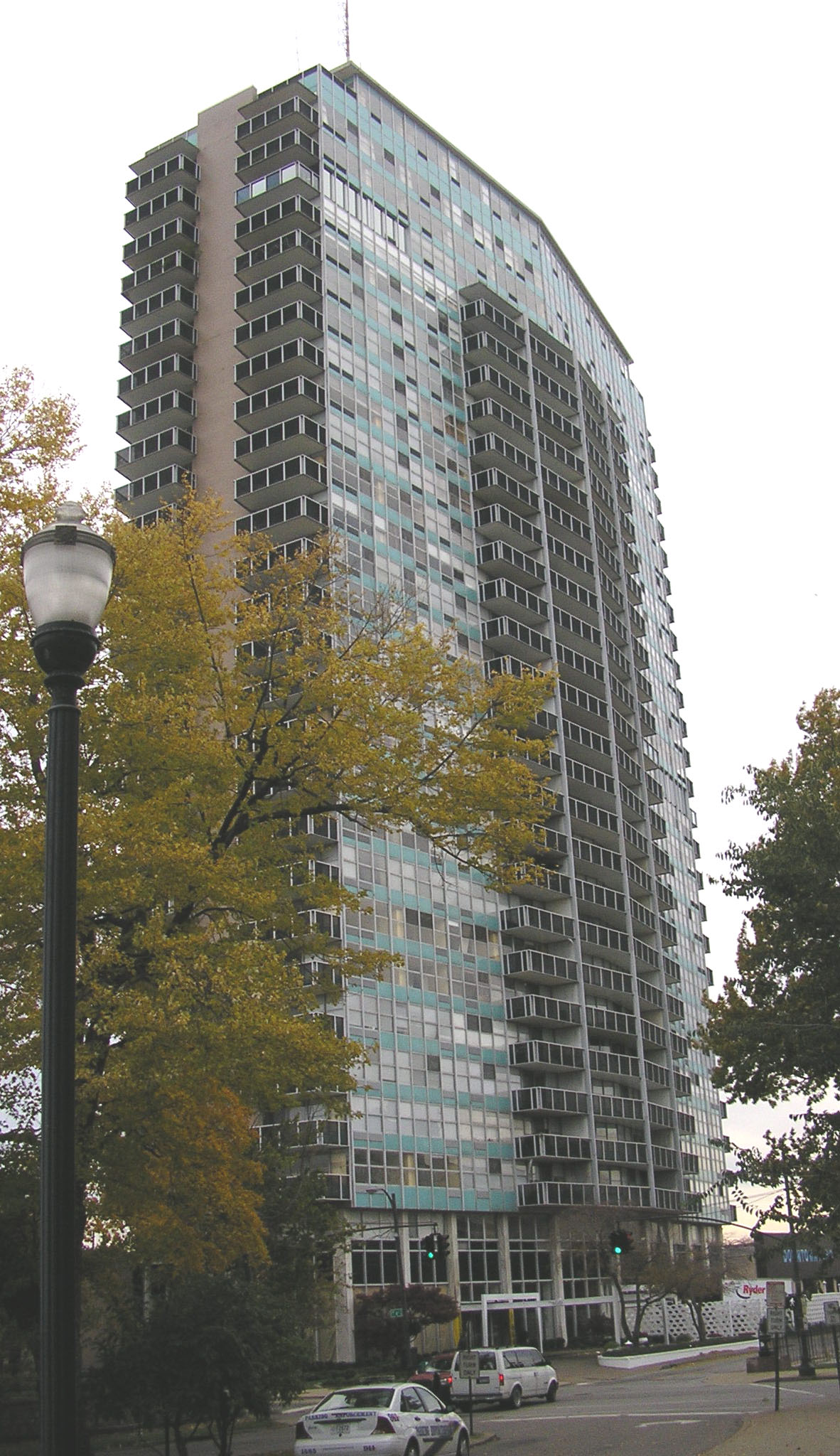
The 800 Apartments, Louisville, Kentucky

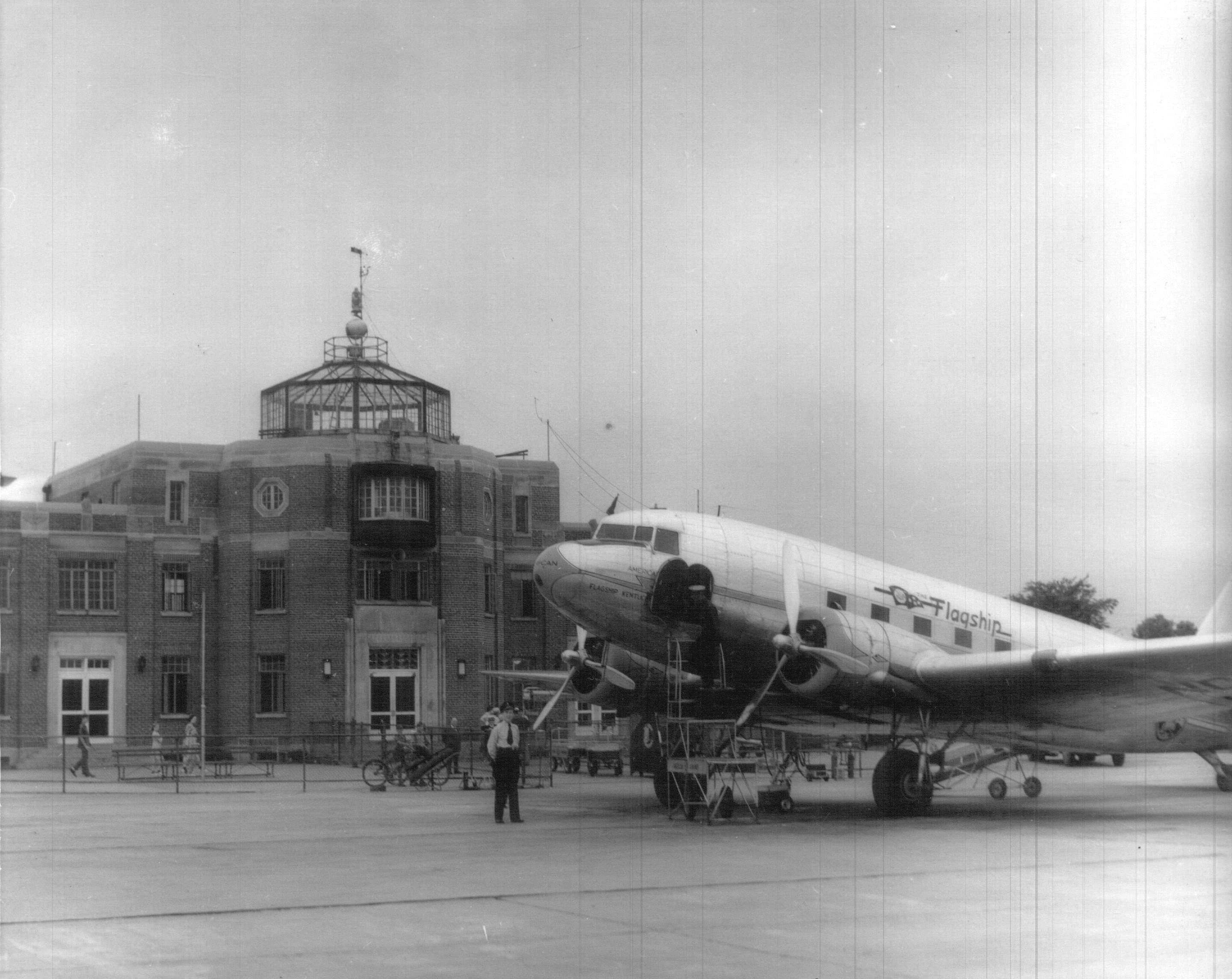
Bowman Field (Kentucky) Administration Building, greater Louisville, Kentucky

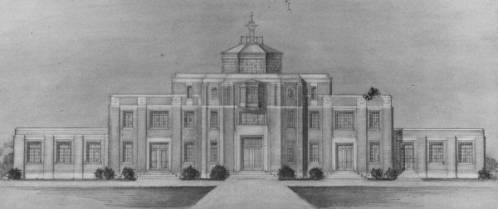
Bowman Field Administration Building pencil sketch from the Works Progress Administration

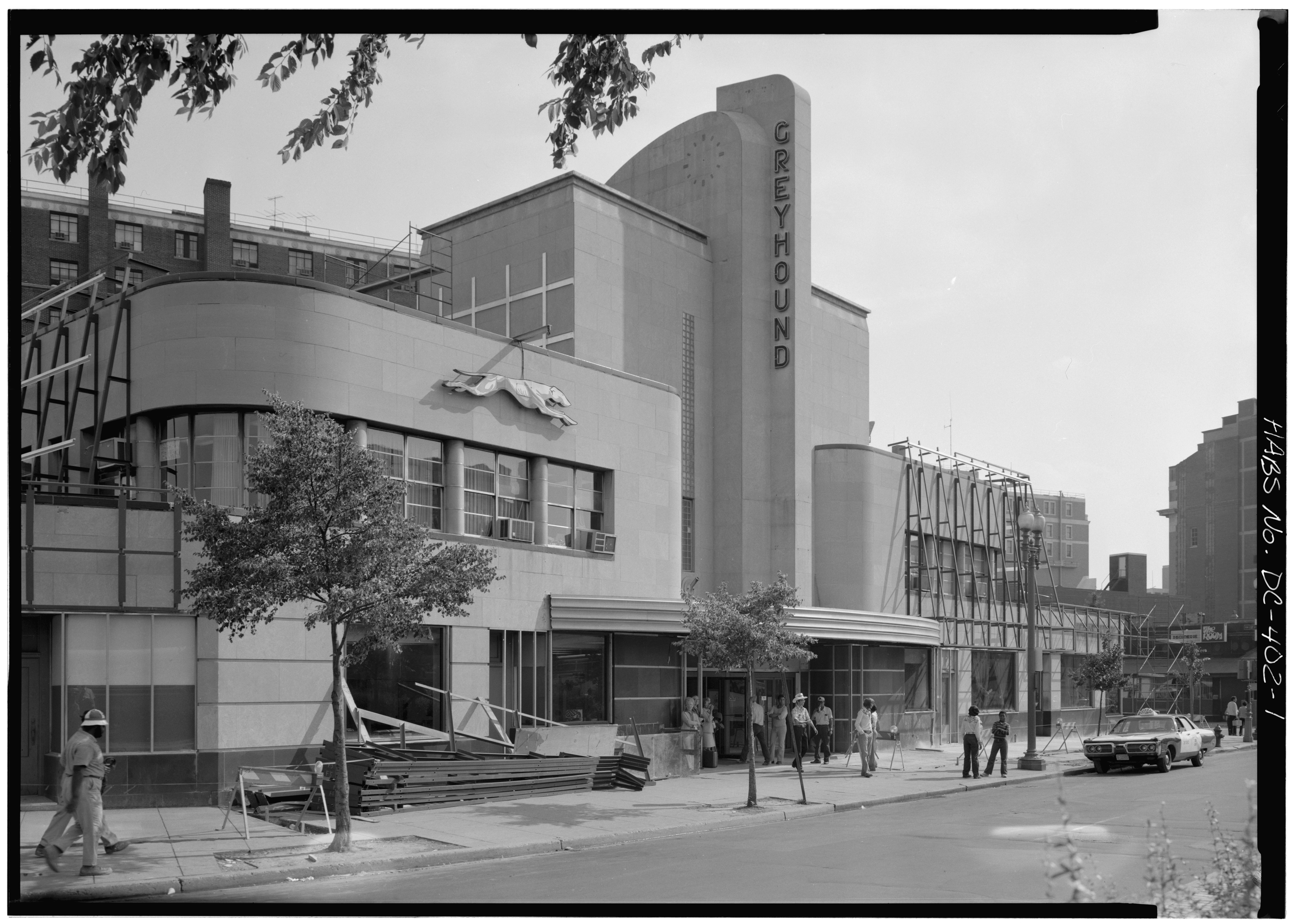
Old Greyhound Terminal (Washington, D.C.) during remodeling

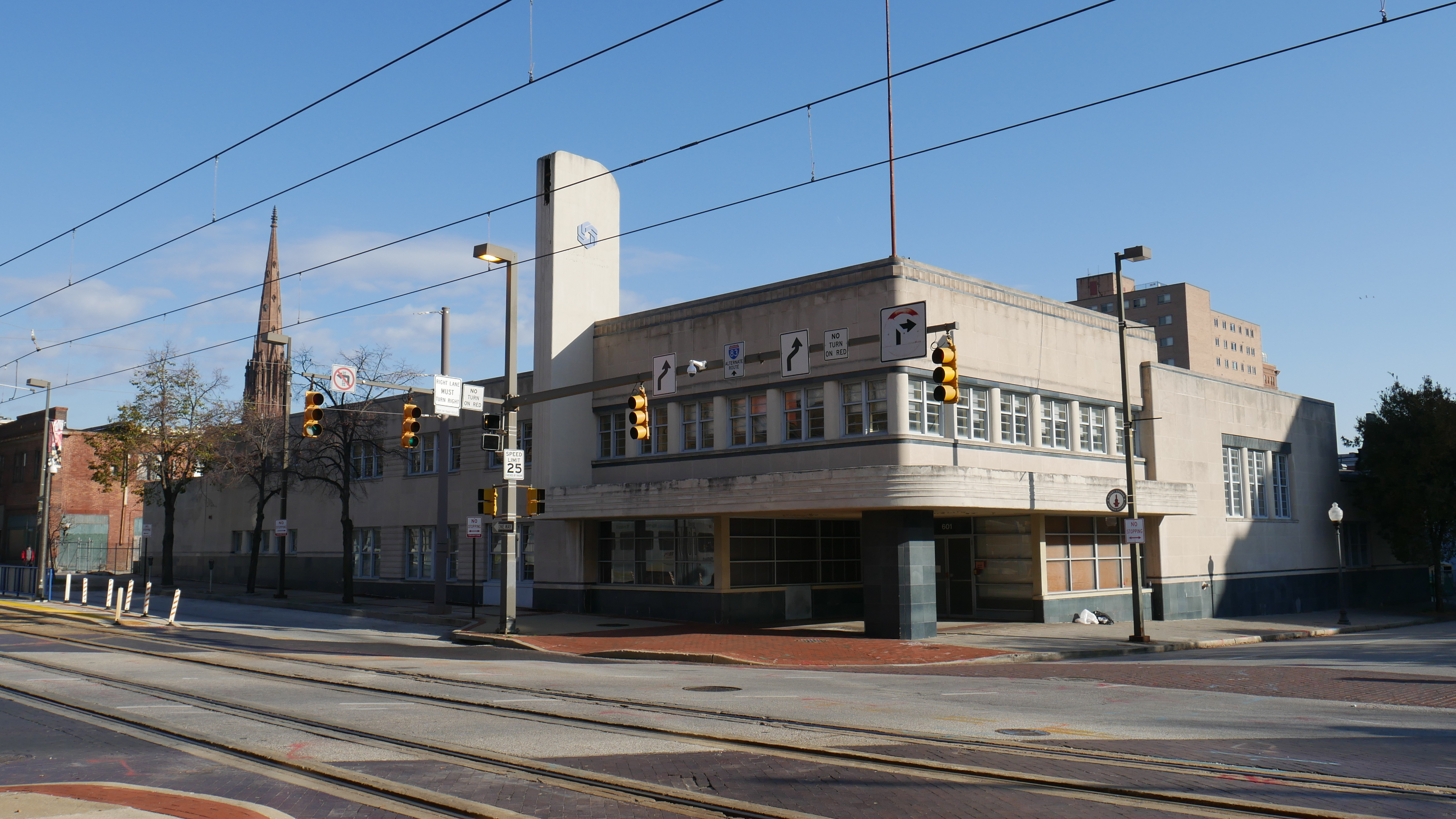
Baltimore, Maryland, Greyhound Station (former)

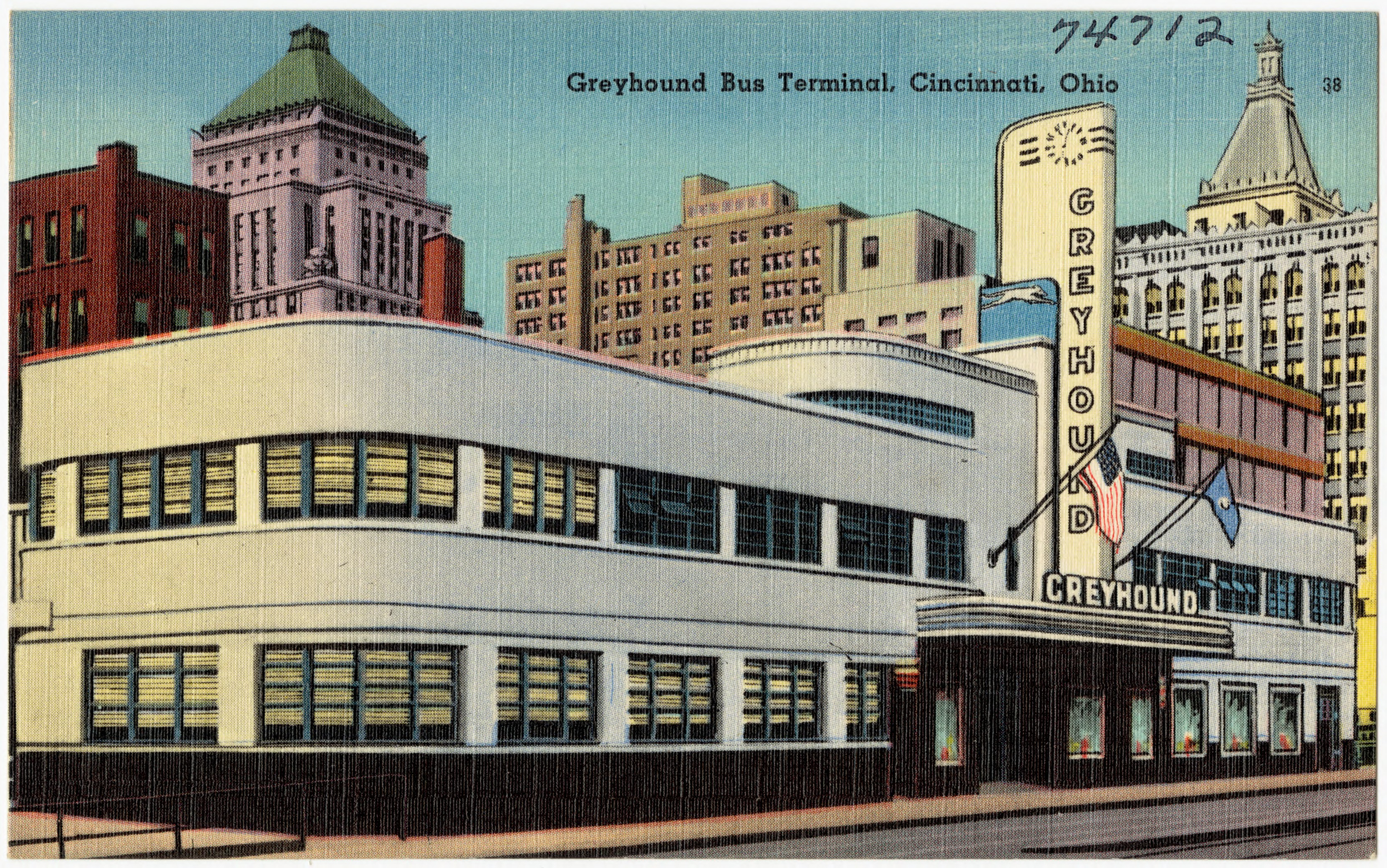
Greyhound Cincinnati, Ohio (demolished) (additional stations in Akron and Dayton)

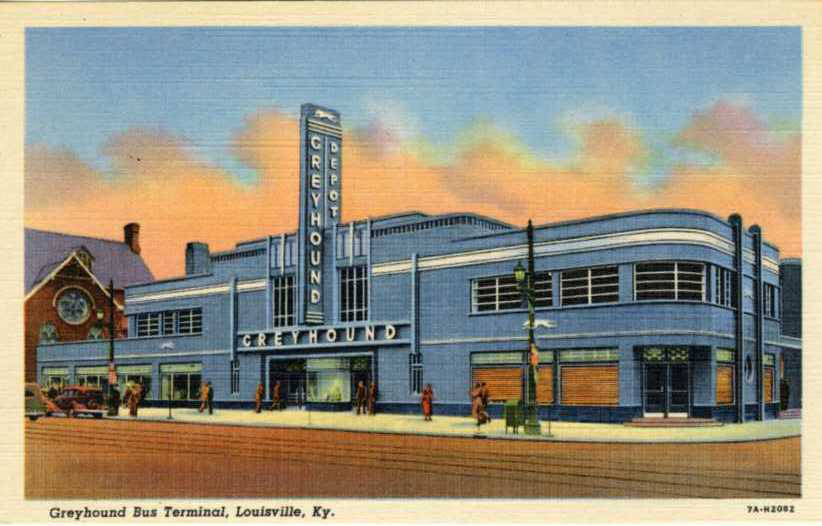
Greyhound depot Louisville, Kentucky (demolished)

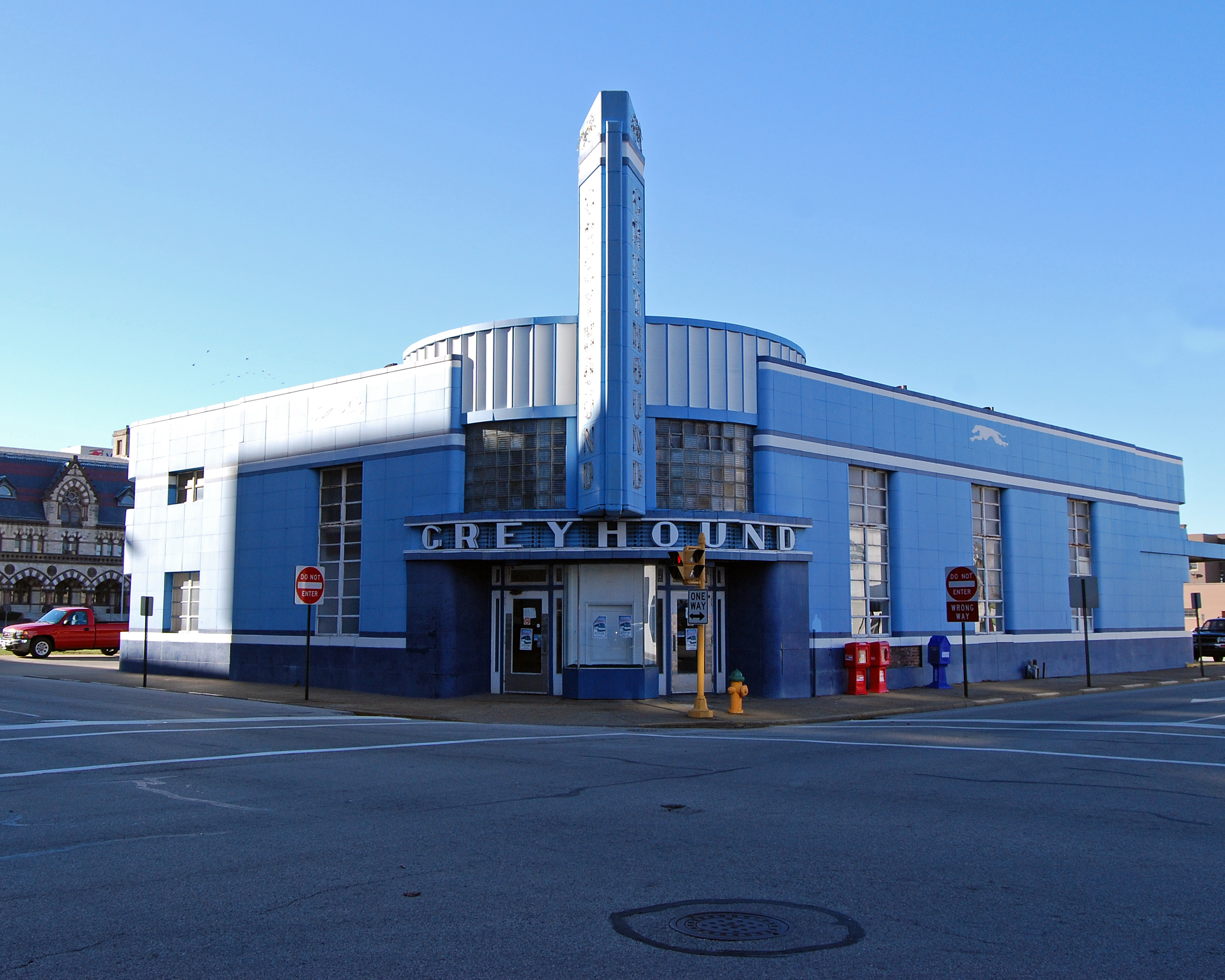
Greyhound Bus Terminal (Evansville, Indiana) (preserved)

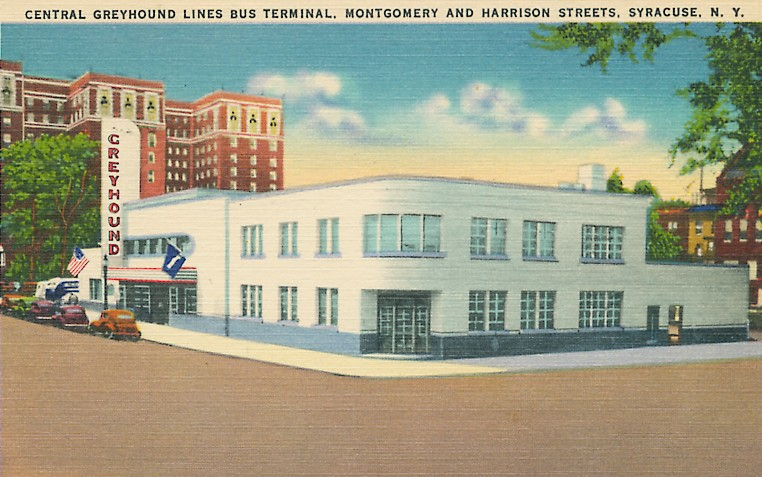
Postcard view c. 1940 of the Central Greyhound Lines Bus Terminal Syracuse New York (Montgomery St at Harrison Street) (since demolished)

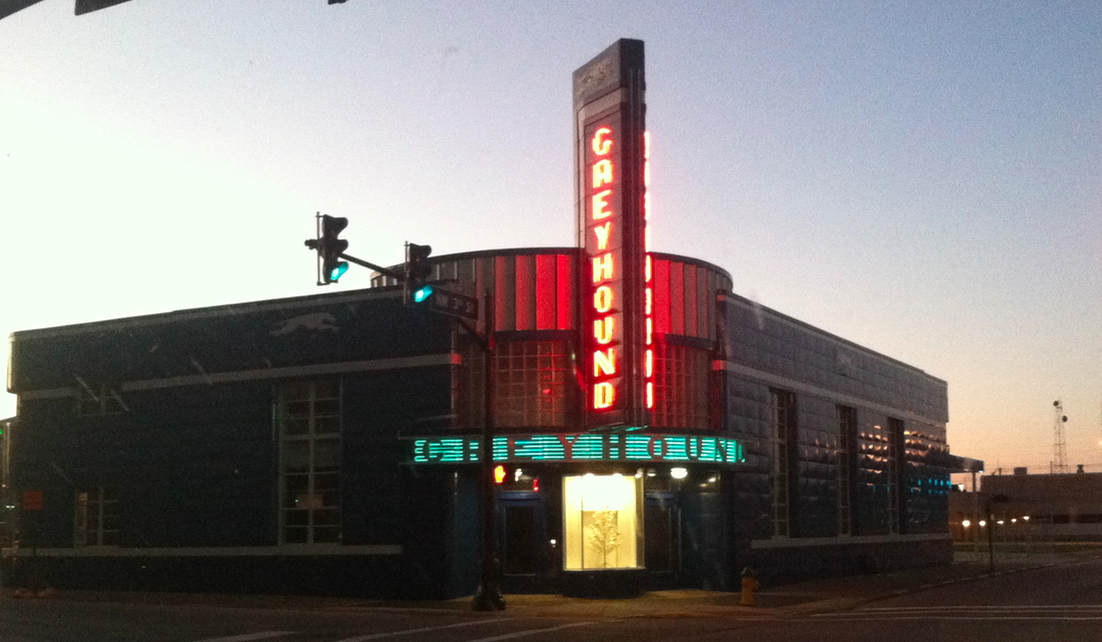
Greyhound Evansville, Indiana (illuminated)

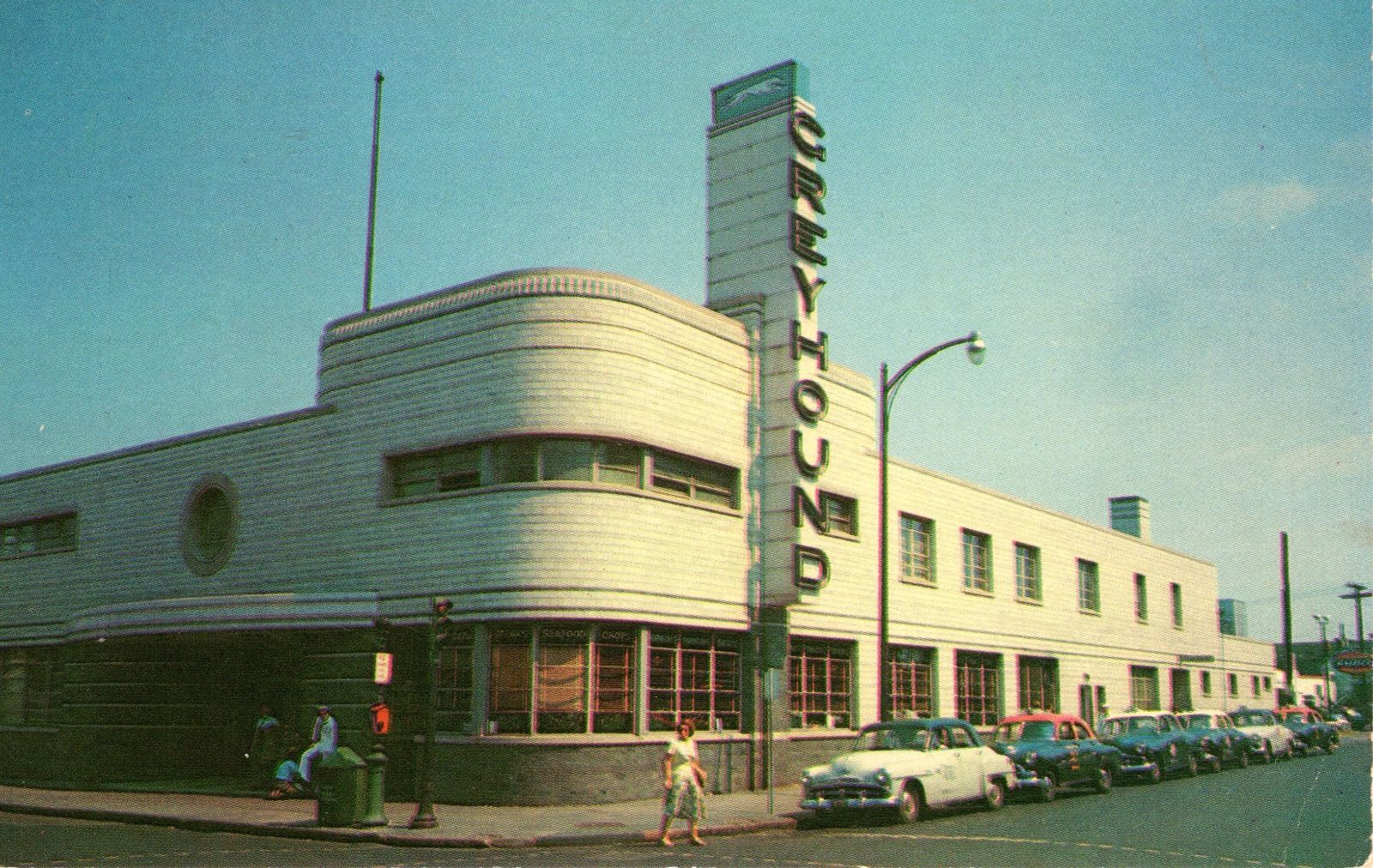
Greyhound Norfolk, Virginia, 1950s postcard

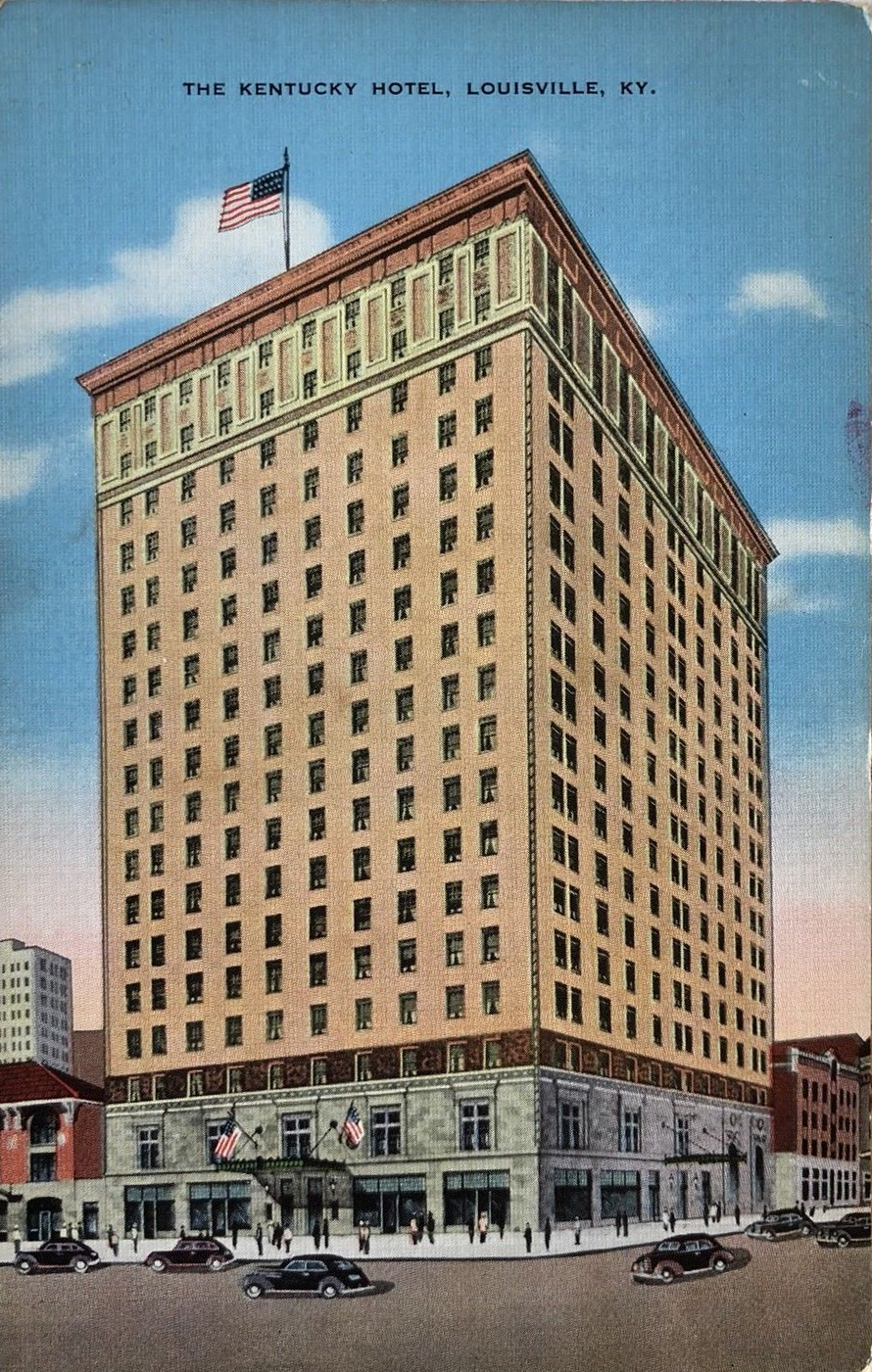
Postcard view of the Kentucky Hotel in Louisville Kentucky, circa 1940

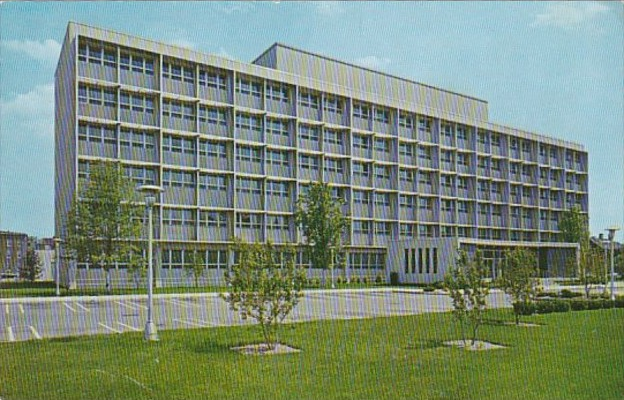
Louisville Methodist Evangelical Hospital (1960 postcard). Now operated by Norton Healthcare

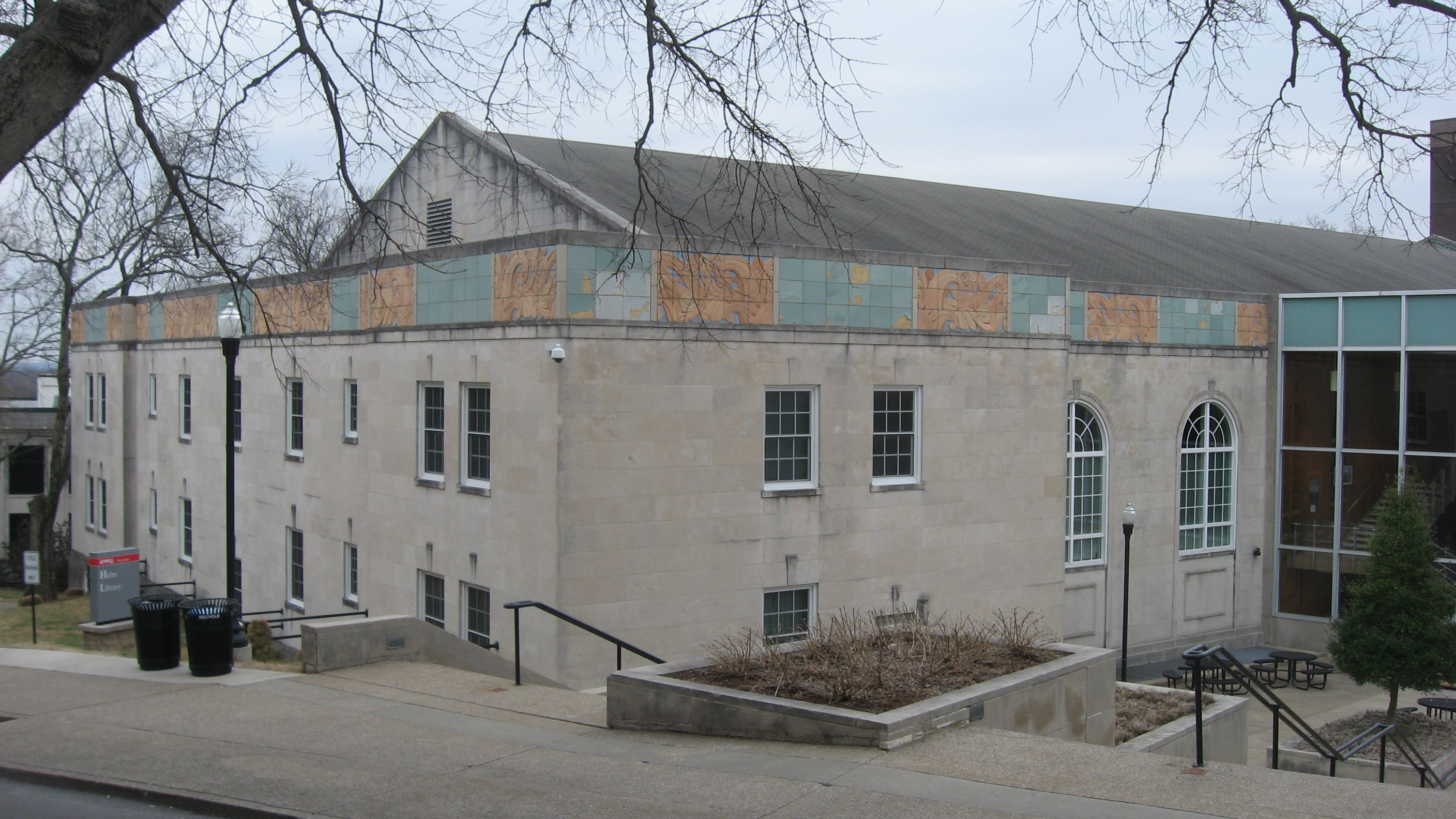
Helm Library at Western Kentucky University

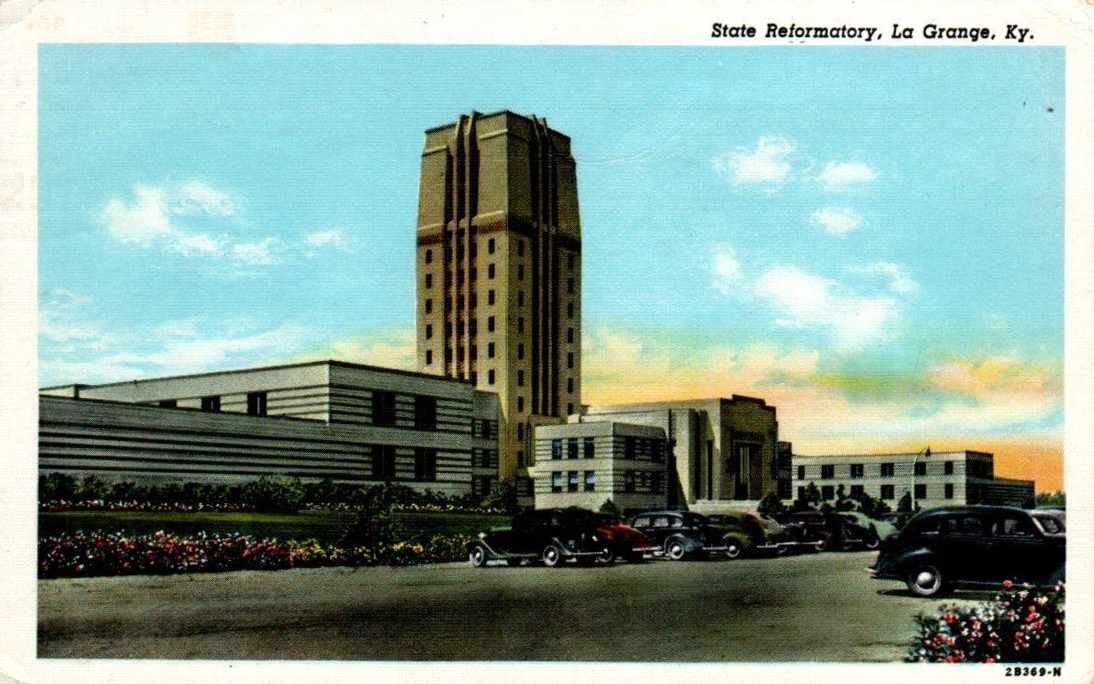
Kentucky State Reformatory, 1939

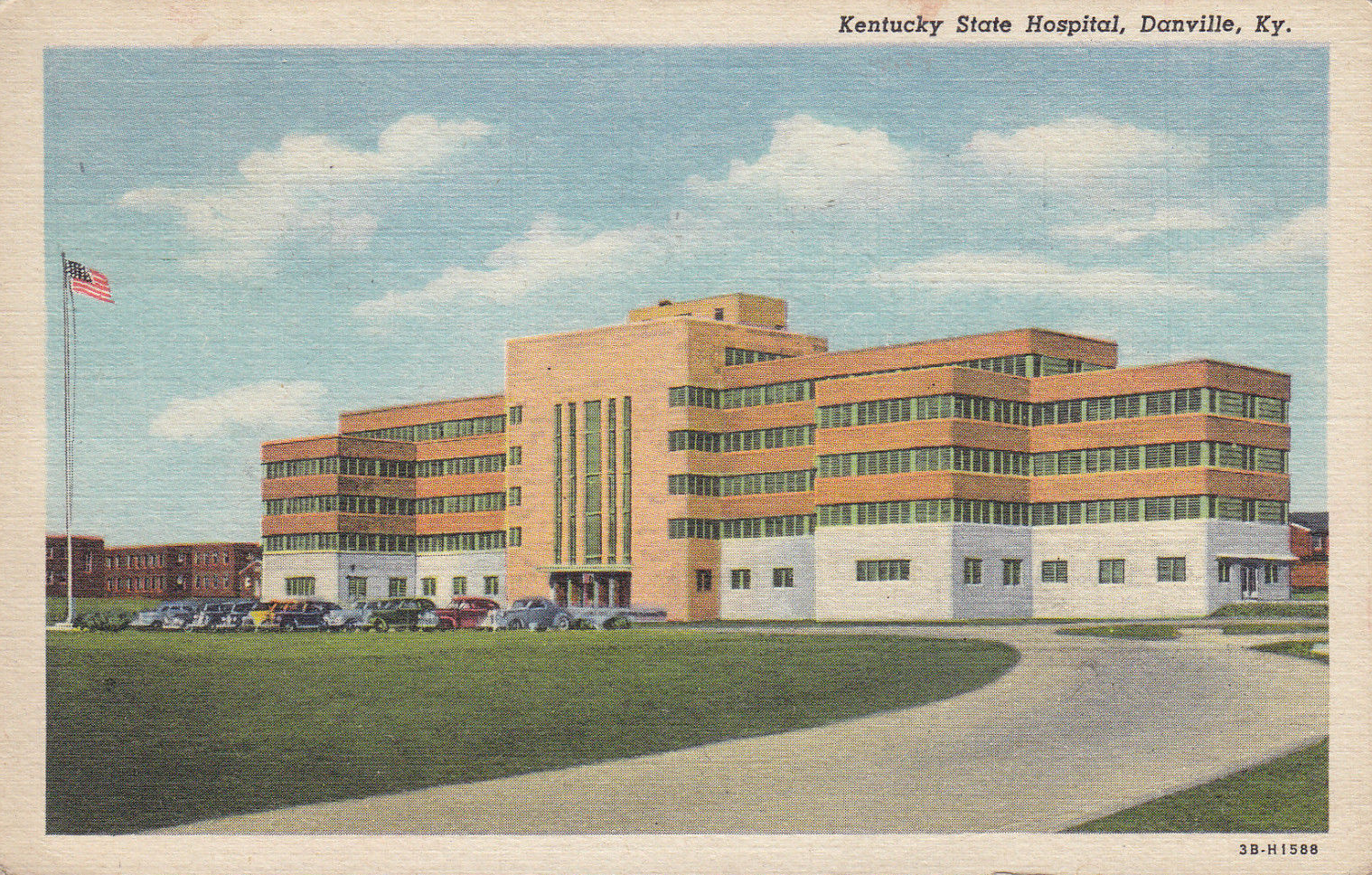
Kentucky State Hospital, Danville, Ky., c. 1940. now part of Northpoint Training Center

== Military service ==
Arrasmith was in the Reserve Officers' Training Corps while at Illinois and was in command of a veteran company in 1933. Following the Ohio River flood of 1937 he led efforts to build a pontoon bridge to link Louisville's downtown to the East End. During the Second World War he served with the United States Army 6th Corps Engineers in Europe and rose to the rank of lieutenant colonel in the army reserves.

== Death and legacy ==
Arrasmith died on November 30, 1965, in Louisville, Kentucky. A collection of his papers is held by The Filson Historical Society. The Filson also holds a collection of architectural drawings from his firm. A book by Frank E. Wrenick devoted to Arrasmith's Greyhound designs was published by McFarland in 2006.
