= Greyhound Lines =

American intercity bus service

Greyhound Lines, Inc.

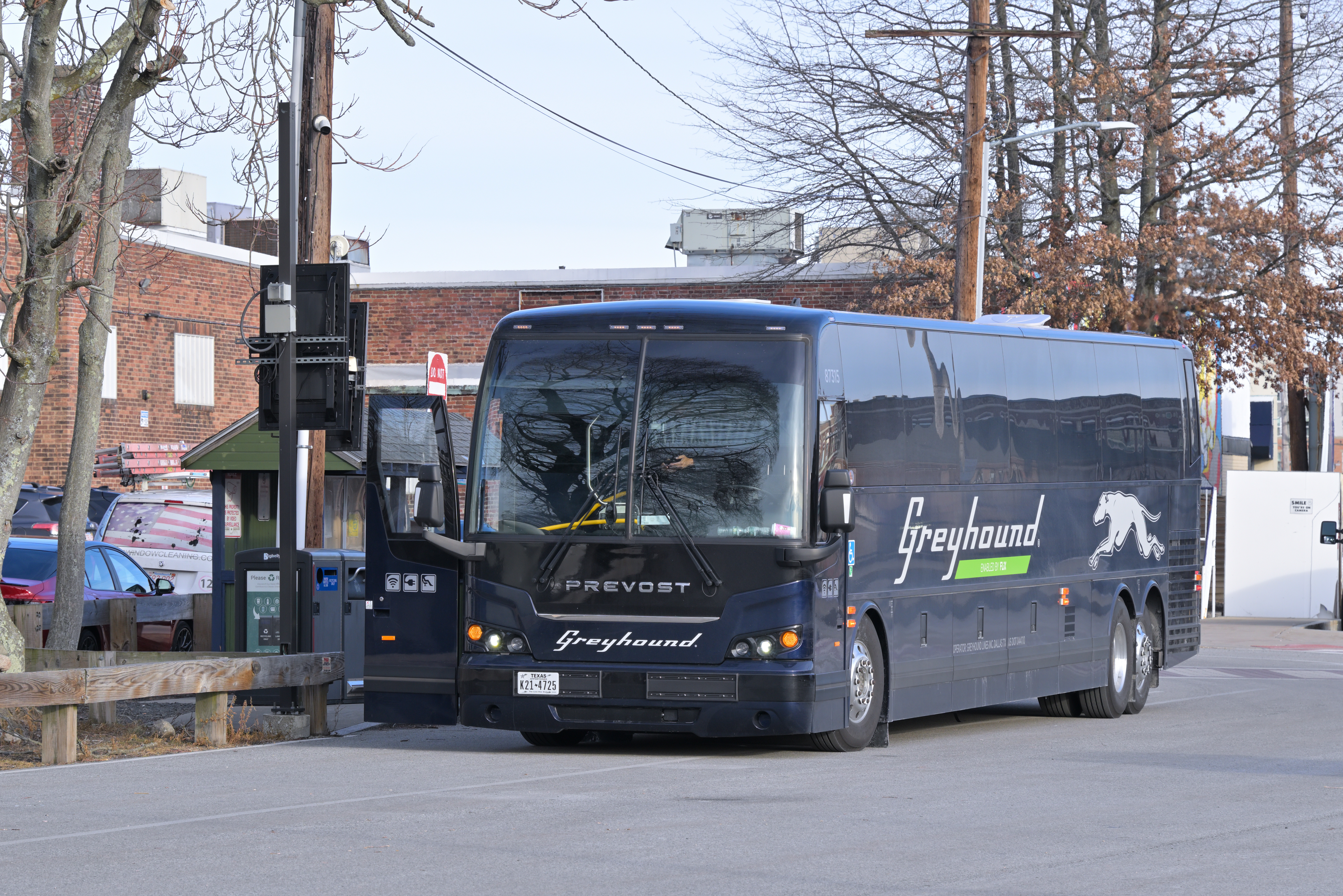
- Greyhound bus in Framingham, Massachusetts, 2025
- Parent: Flix SE
- Founded: 1914; 112 years ago by Carl Wickman in Hibbing, Minnesota, U.S
- Headquarters: 350 North Saint Paul Street; Dallas, Texas, U.S.
- Service area: United States; Mexico
- Service type: Intercity bus service
- Alliance: FlixBus
- Routes: 123 routes (includes Greyhound Express routes)
- Stations: 230 (company operated)
- Fleet: 1,700 motorcoaches, MCI D45 CRT, MCI D4505, VanHool CX45 and Prevost X3-45
- Fuel type: Diesel
- Chief executive: Kai Boysan (President and CEO)
- Website: greyhound.com

Greyhound Lines, Inc., is an American operator of intercity bus services. Greyhound operates the largest intercity bus network in the United States, and also operates charter and Amtrak Thruway services, as well as intercity buses in Mexico, and also in Canada. Based in Dallas, Texas, Greyhound is a subsidiary of Flix SE, owner of FlixBus. Greyhound serves over 1,600 American destinations. The company's first route began in Hibbing, Minnesota, in 1914 and the company adopted the Greyhound name in 1929.

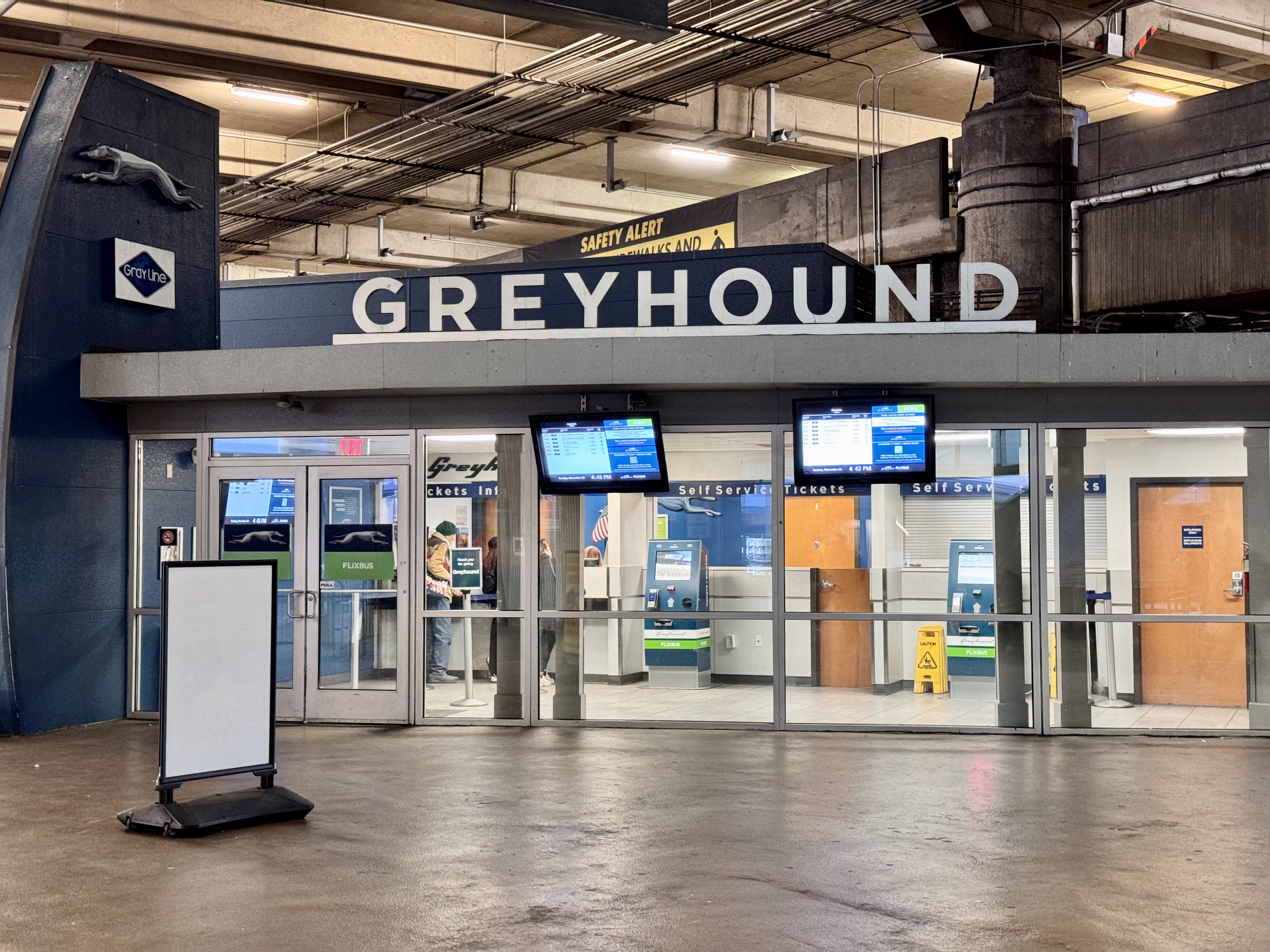
A modern Greyhound bus terminal at Washington Union Station, Washington, D.C.

== History ==
=== 1914–1930: early years ===
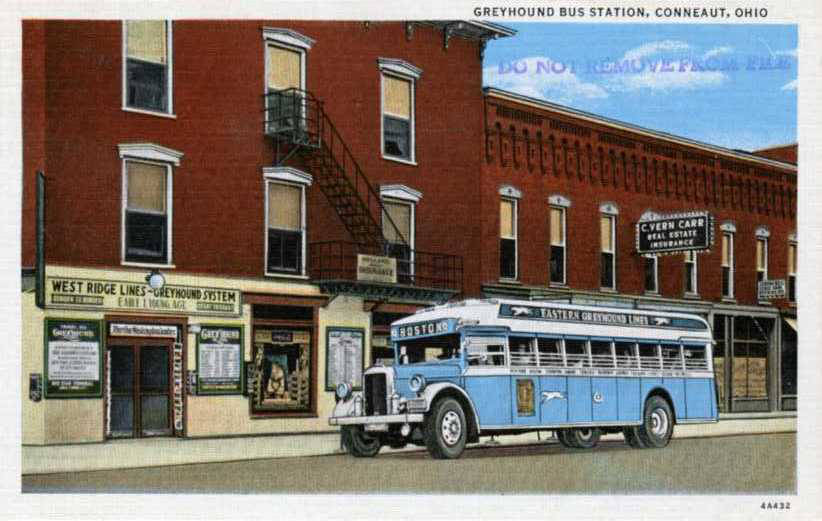
An Eastern Greyhound Lines coach depicted at a stop in Conneaut, Ohio, c. 1930

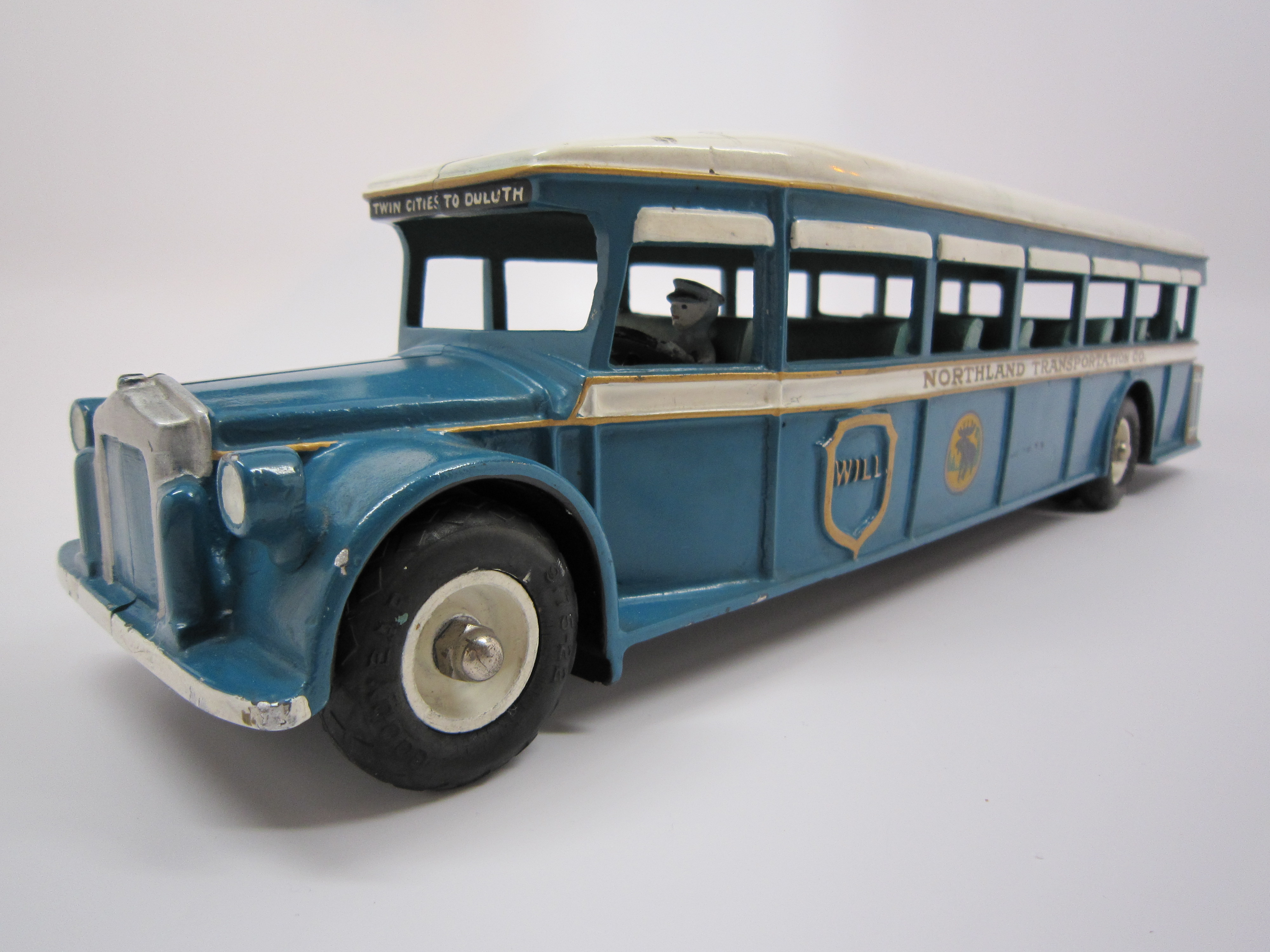
Cast iron model "Northland Transportation Co." passenger bus, c. 1930

In 1914, Eric Wickman, a 27-year-old Swedish immigrant, was laid off from his job as a drill operator at a mine in Alice, Minnesota. He became a Hupmobile salesman in Hibbing, Minnesota, and when he could not sell the first seven-passenger Hupmobile that he received, he began using it along with Swedish immigrant Andy "Bus Andy" Anderson and C. A. A. "Arvid" Heed to transport iron ore miners two miles from Hibbing to Alice for 15 cents per ride. Wickman made $2.25 on his first run.

Wickman almost quit after the first winter due to the harsh driving conditions in Minnesota. However, he agreed to continue on by reducing his driving duties. In 1915, he added a 15-mile route to Nashwauk, Minnesota. In December 1915, Wickman merged his company with that of 19-year-old Ralph Bogan, who was running a similar transportation service from Hibbing to Duluth, Minnesota, to form the Mesaba Transportation Company. By 1918, the company had 18 vehicles and annual income of $40,000.

In 1922, Wickman and Heed sold their interests in the company to Bogan and Anderson. Wickman and Heed then moved to Duluth and acquired White Bus Lines. In 1924, Wickman formed Northland, which acquired the Superior-White Company; its founder, Orville S. Caesar, who had strong business acumen, mechanical skills, and ambition, eventually became president of the company. In 1925, the company completed the $2.5 million acquisition of eight independent bus lines in Minnesota. In 1928, Anderson and Bogan disbanded and sold most of the routes of the Mesaba Transportation Company to Northland.

The company continued to expand and, in 1928, it had income of $6 million and was offering trips across the United States. By this point, the company had 350 buses and 504 stations. In 1929, the company acquired the Yelloway-Pioneer System, which in 1928 made the first transcontinental bus trip, and The Pickwick Corporation.

In 1929, the company acquired additional interests in Gray Line Worldwide and part of the Colonial Motor Coach Company to form Eastern Greyhound Lines. It also acquired an interest in Northland Transportation Company and renamed it Northland Greyhound Lines.

=== 1930–1945 ===
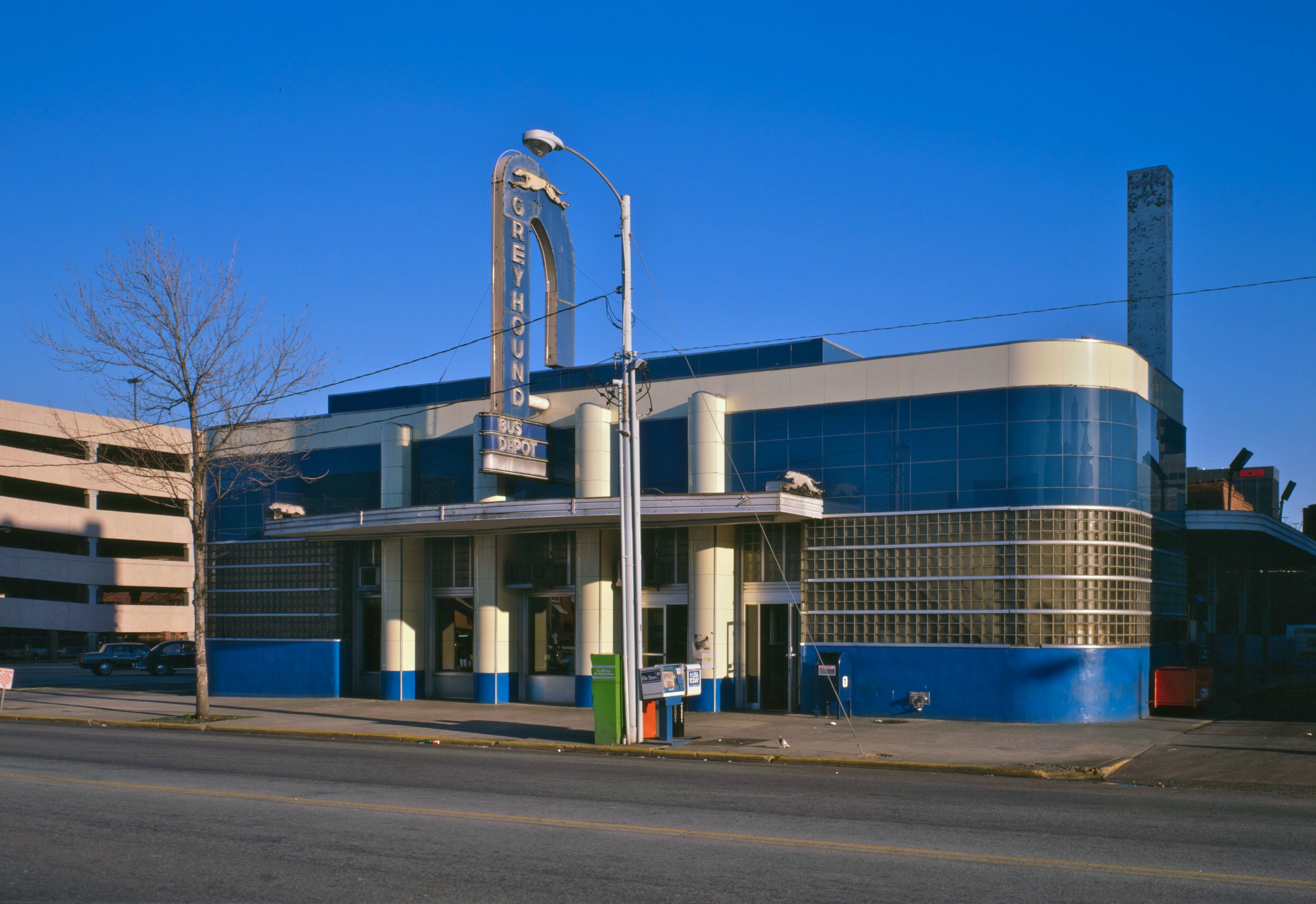
A preserved Streamline Moderne 1939 Greyhound depot in Columbia, South Carolina (1986 photo)

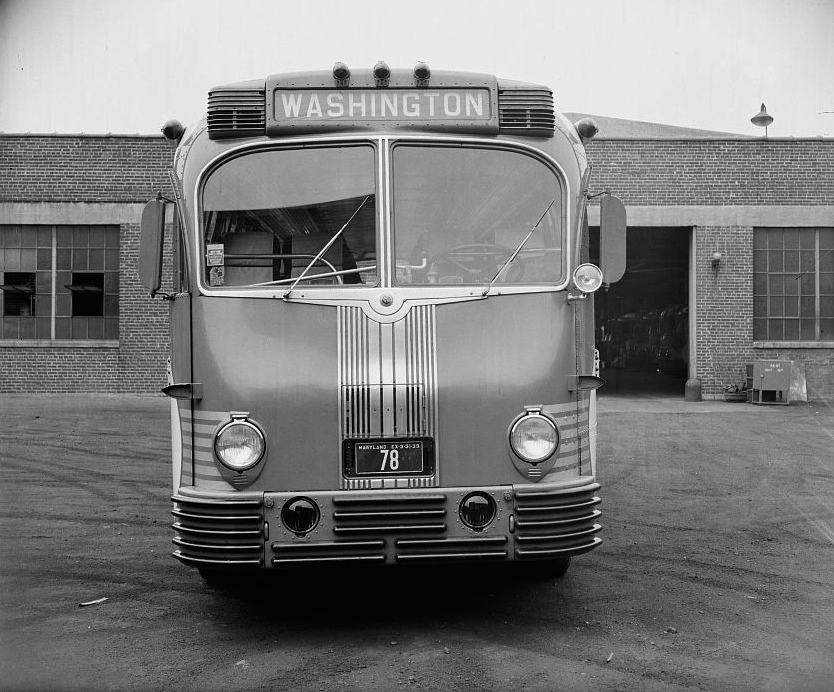
Front view of a Greyhound Lines Super Coach in Maryland (1938 photo) (side view)

By 1930, more than 100 bus lines had been consolidated into the parent company, then called Motor Transit Corporation. Recognizing the need for a more memorable name, the partners of the Motor Transit Corporation changed its name to The Greyhound Corporation after the Greyhound name used by earlier bus lines. According to company lore, that name came from a driver, Ed Stone, who was reminded of a greyhound when he saw a passing bus in a reflection.

Also in 1930, the company moved from Duluth, Minnesota to Chicago, Illinois.

The business suffered during the Great Depression, and by 1931 was over $1 million in debt. As the 1930s progressed and the economy improved, Greyhound began to prosper again.

In 1934, intercity bus lines, of which Greyhound was the largest carried approximately 400 million passengers — nearly as many passengers as the Class I railroads. The film It Happened One Night (1934) — about an heiress (Claudette Colbert) traveling by Greyhound bus with a reporter (Clark Gable) — has been credited by the company for spurring bus travel nationwide.

In 1935, national intercity bus ridership climbed 50% to 651,999,000 passengers, surpassing the volume of passengers carried by the Class I railroads for the first time. In 1935, Wickman reported record profits of $8 million. In 1936, already the largest bus carrier in the United States, Greyhound began taking delivery of 306 new buses.

In 1941, the company acquired Greyhound Canada.

Between 1937 and 1945, Greyhound built many new stations and acquired new buses in the period in the late Art Deco style known as Streamline Moderne. For terminals, Greyhound retained architects including William Strudwick Arrasmith and George D. Brown. Multiple Streamline Moderne-style Greyhound stations are listed on the National Register of Historic Places, including stations in Blytheville, Arkansas; Cleveland, Ohio; Columbia, South Carolina; Evansville, Indiana, Jackson, Mississippi, and Washington, D.C.

Greyhound worked with the Yellow Coach Manufacturing Company for its streamlined Series 700 buses, first for Series 719 prototypes in 1934, and from 1937 as the exclusive customer for Yellow's Series 743 bus (which Greyhound named the "Super Coach"). Greyhound bought a total of 1,256 buses between 1937 and 1939.

By the beginning of World War II, the company had 4,750 stations and nearly 10,000 employees.

=== 1945–1983: expansion, desegregation, and diversification ===
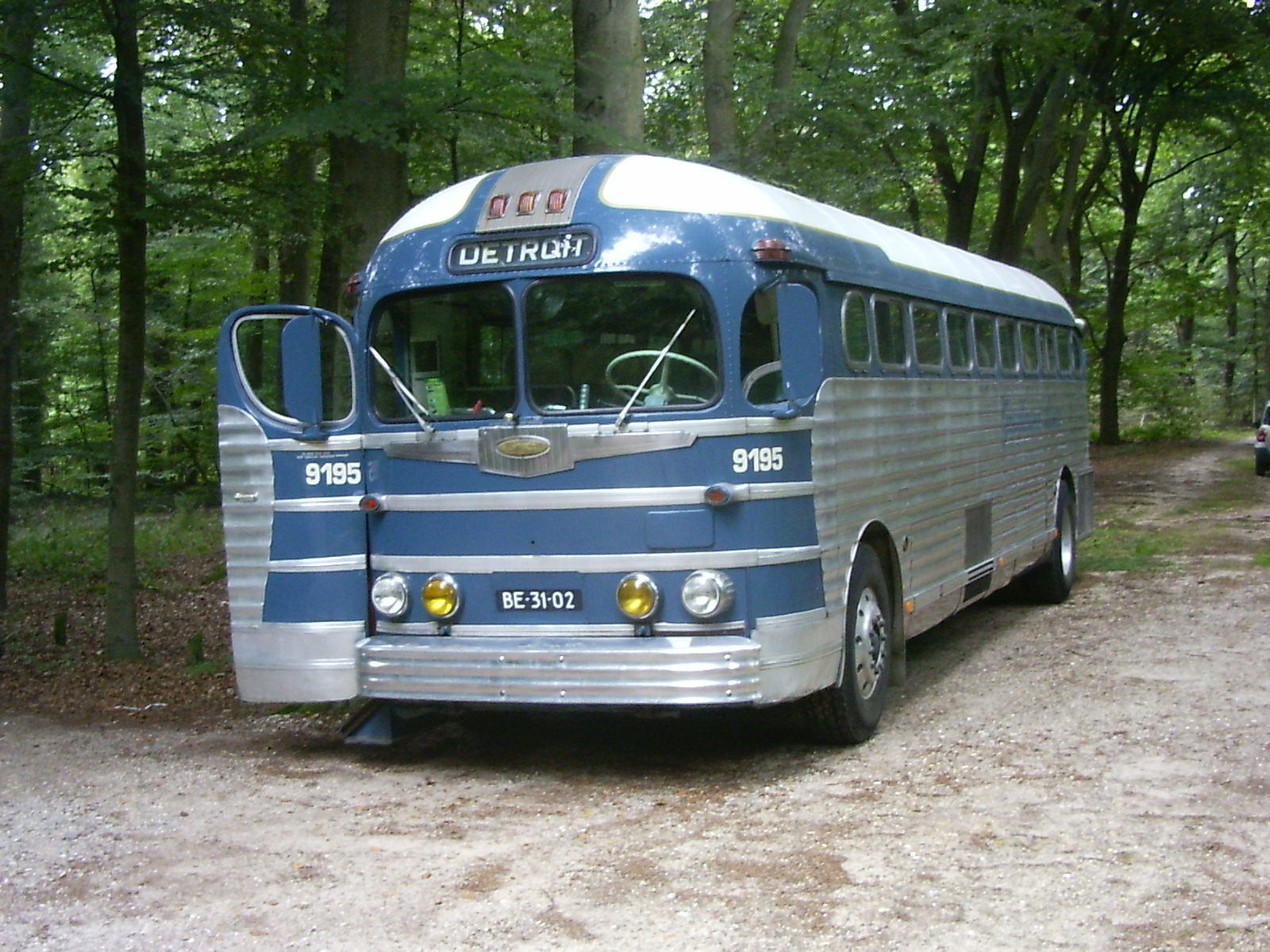
A Greyhound GMC PD-3751 Silversides in the 1950s livery

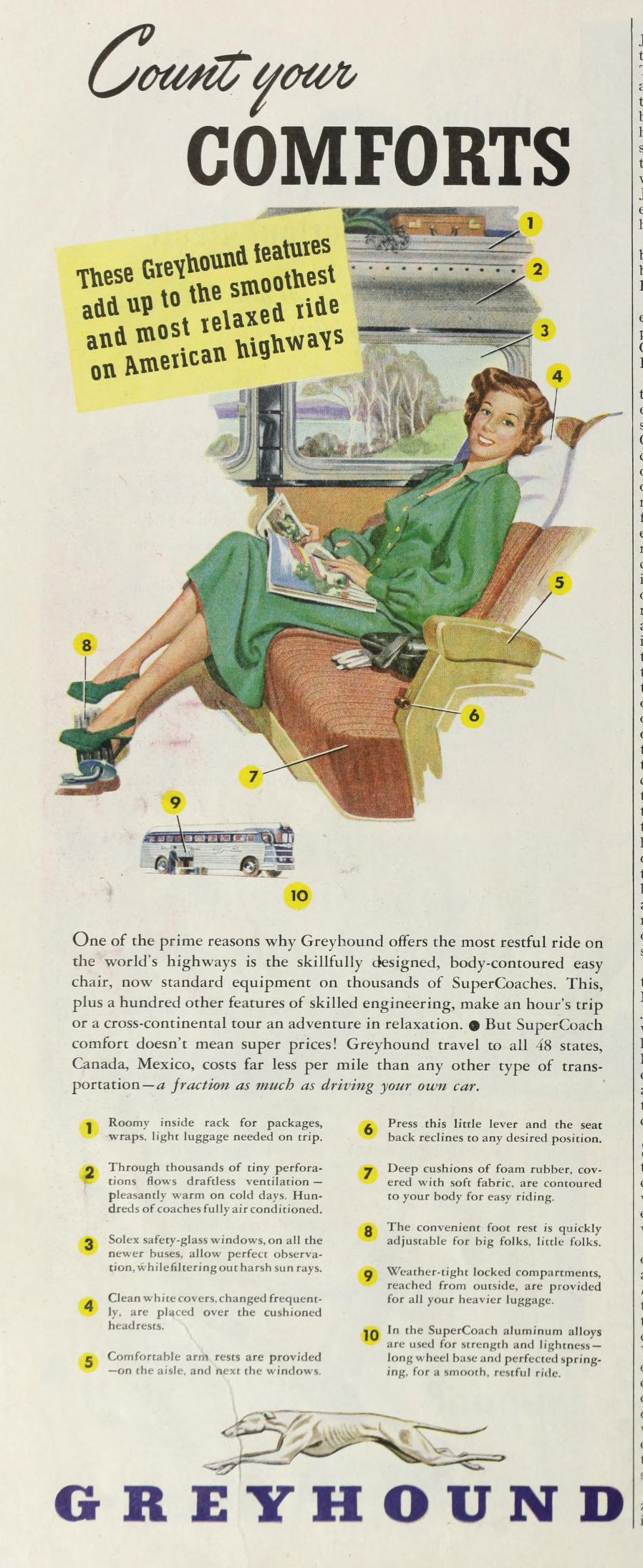
1949 ad for the bus service.

Wickman retired as president of the Greyhound Corporation in 1946 and was replaced by his long-time partner Orville S. Caesar. Wickman died at the age of 66 in 1954.

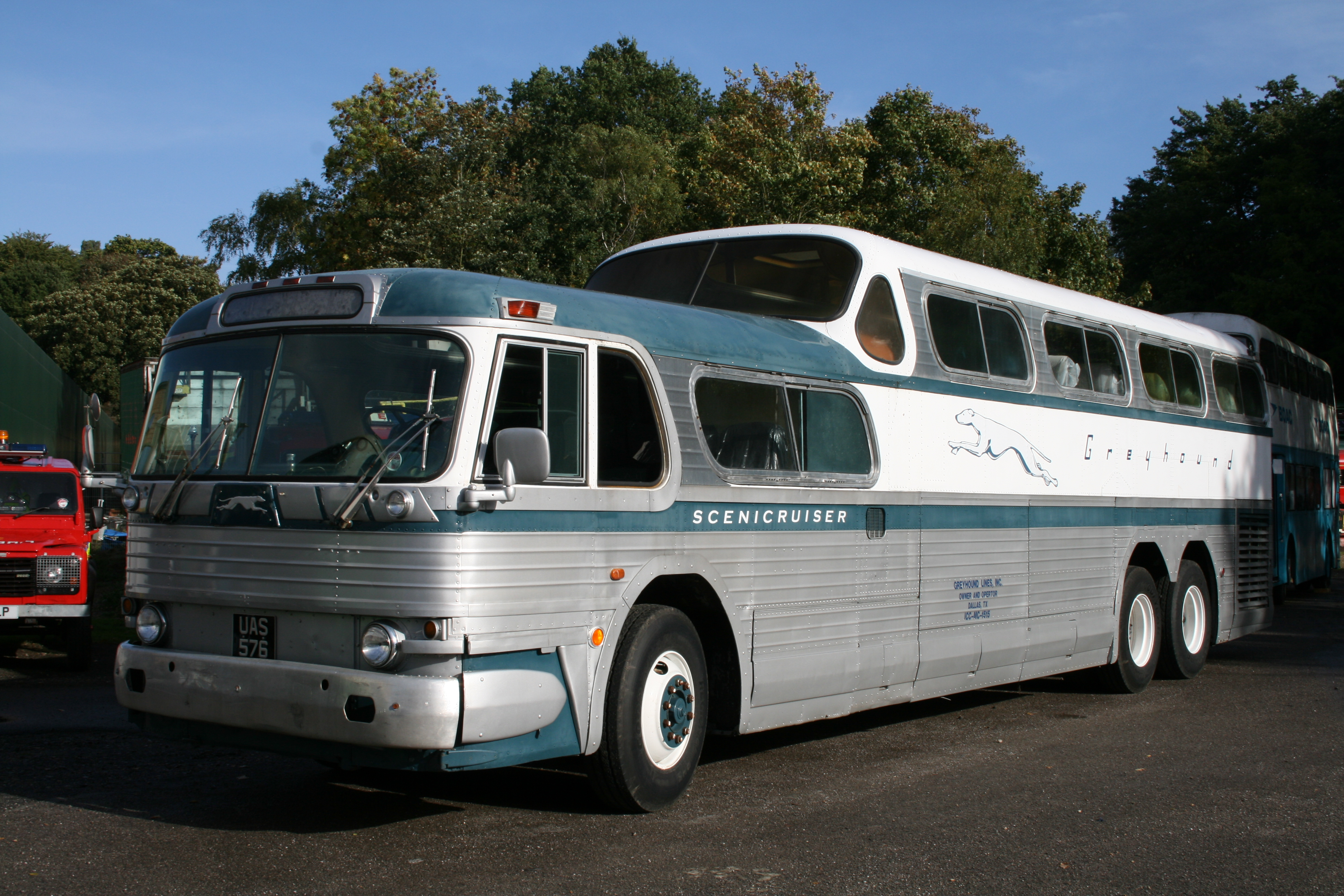
1954 GM Scenicruiser, designed by Roland E. Gegoux and manufactured exclusively for Greyhound

Greyhound commissioned industrial designer Raymond Loewy and General Motors to design several distinctive buses from the 1930s through the 1950s. Loewy's first was the Yellow Coach PDG-4101, the Greyhound Silversides produced in 1940–1941. Production was suspended during World War II. When the "Silversides" buses resumed production in 1947, it was renamed GM PD 3751. PD 3751 production continued through 1948. In 1954, the first of Greyhound's distinctive hump-backed buses was introduced. In 1944, Loewy had produced drawings for the GM GX-1, a full double-decker parlor bus with the first prototype built in 1953. The PD-4501 Scenicruiser was designed by Roland E. Gegoux and built by General Motors as model PD-4501. The front of the bus was markedly lower than its rear section.

After World War II, and the building of the Interstate Highway System beginning in 1956, automobile travel became a preferred mode of travel in the United States. This, combined with the increasing affordability of air travel, led to a decline in business for Greyhound and other intercity bus carriers.

In October 1953, Greyhound acquired the Tennessee Coach Company's entire operation, and the negotiations for the Blue Ridge Lines, and its affiliate White Star Lines, that operated between Cleveland and the Mid Atlantic Seaboard.

==== Freedom Rides and the civil rights movement ====
In 1955, the Interstate Commerce Commission ruled in the case of Keys v. Carolina Coach Co. that U.S. interstate bus operations, such as Greyhound's, could not be segregated by race. In 1960, in the case of Boynton v. Virginia, the U.S. Supreme Court found that an African American had been wrongfully convicted for trespassing in a "whites only" terminal area.

In May 1961, Civil Rights Movement activists organized interracial Freedom Rides as proof of the desegregation rulings. On May 14, a mob attacked a pair of buses (a Greyhound and a Trailways) traveling from Washington, D.C., to New Orleans, Louisiana, and slashed the Greyhound bus's tires. Several miles outside of Anniston, Alabama, the mob forced the Greyhound bus to stop, broke its windows, and firebombed it. The mob held the bus' doors shut, intending to burn the riders to death. Sources disagree, but either an exploding fuel tank or an undercover state investigator brandishing a revolver caused the mob to retreat. When the riders escaped the bus, the mob beat them, while warning shots fired into the air by highway patrolmen prevented them from being lynched. Additional Freedom Riders were beaten by a mob at the Montgomery, Alabama station.

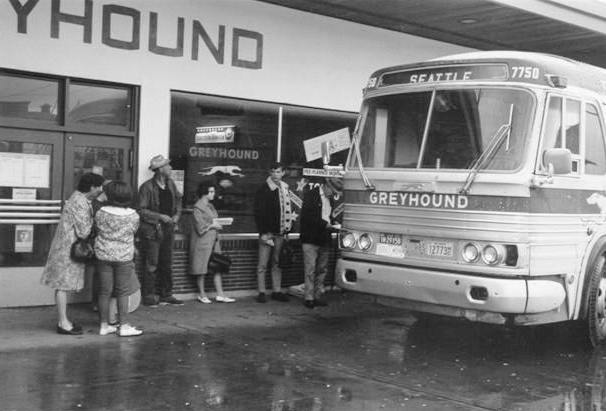
A GMC PD-4106, ready for boarding in Salem, Oregon, for a trip north to Seattle on the then-new Interstate 5, in the fall of 1965

The Civil Rights Act of 1964's Title II and Title III broadened protections beyond federally regulated carriers such as Greyhound, to include non-discrimination in hotels, restaurants, and other public accommodations, as well as state and local government buildings.

==== Late 1960s, 1970s, and early 1980s ====
Later in the 1960s, Greyhound ridership declined and Greyhound used the profitable bus operations to invest in other industries.

In 1966, Gerald H. Trautman became president and CEO of the company.

In 1970, the company acquired Armour and Company meat-packing company, which owned the Dial deodorant soap brand, for $400 million.

In 1971, Greyhound moved its headquarters to Phoenix, Arizona.

The company also acquired Traveller's Express money orders, MCI and TMC bus manufacturing companies, and airliner leasing.

In the late 1970s, Greyhound began hiring African American and female drivers for the first time.

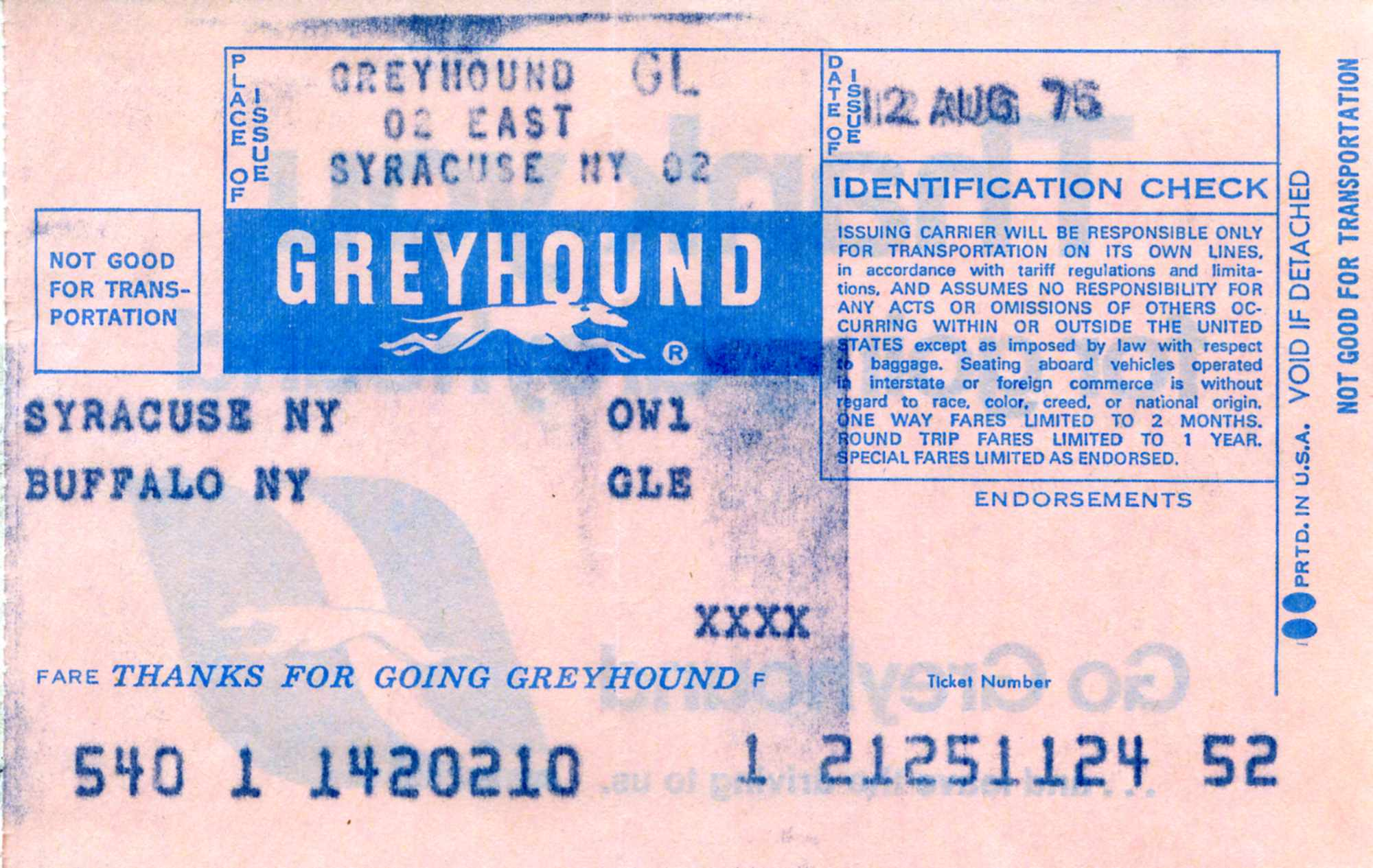
Greyhound bus ticket receipt from August 1975

In 1972, Greyhound introduced the unlimited mileage Ameripass. The pass was initially marketed as offering "99 days for $99" or, transportation to anywhere at any time for a dollar a day. For decades, it was a popular choice for people traveling across the U.S. on a budget. Over time, Greyhound raised the price of the pass, shortened its validity period and rebranded it as the Discovery Pass, until it was discontinued in 2012.

Greyhound acquired Premier Cruise Line in 1984. Between 1985 and 1993, Premier operated as the "Official Cruise Line of Walt Disney World" with onboard Disney characters.

=== 1983–2001: consolidation, strikes, and bankruptcies ===
==== 1983 Greyhound drivers' strike ====
In 1983, Greyhound operated a fleet of 3,800 buses and carried about 60% of the intercity bus-travel market in the United States.

Starting November 2, 1983, Greyhound suffered a major and bitter drivers' strike action. A fatality occurred in Zanesville, Ohio, when a replacement driver ran over a striking worker at a picket line. A new contract was ratified on December 19, 1983, and drivers returned to work the next day.

==== 1986–1990: spin-off, merger, and first bankruptcy ====
In early 1987, the bus line was acquired by an investor group led by Fred Currey, a former executive of rival Continental Trailways, who became CEO of Greyhound and relocated its headquarters to Dallas, Texas.

In February 1987, Greyhound Lines' new ownership and the Amalgamated Transit Union (ATU) agreed on a new, 3-year contract.

In June 1987, Greyhound Lines acquired Trailways, Inc. (formerly Continental Trailways), the largest member of the rival Trailways Transportation System, effectively consolidating into a national bus service. Greyhound was required by the Interstate Commerce Commission to maintain coordinated schedules with other scheduled service operators in the U.S.

Between 1987 and 1990, Greyhound Lines' former parent continued to be called The Greyhound Corporation, confusing passengers and investors alike. The Greyhound Corporation retained Premier Cruise Lines and ten non-bus subsidiaries using the Greyhound name, such as Greyhound Leisure Services, Inc. (an operator of airport and cruise ship duty-free shops), and Greyhound Exhibits. In March 1990, The Greyhound Corporation changed its name to Greyhound Dial Corporation. Because Greyhound Dial's switchboard continued to get questions from misdirected bus passengers, it changed its name to The Dial Corporation in March 1991, to eliminate any association with bus travel.

==== 1990 Greyhound drivers' strike ====
In early 1990, the drivers' contract from 1987 expired at the end of its three-year term. In March, the ATU began a strike action against Greyhound. The 1990 drivers' strike was similar in its bitterness to the strike of 1983, with violence against both strikers and their replacement workers. One striker in California was killed by a Greyhound bus driven by a strikebreaker, and a shot was fired at a Greyhound bus. While Greyhound CEO Fred Currey argued that "no American worth his salt negotiates with terrorists," ATU leader Edward M. Strait responded that management's failure to negotiate amounted to "putting the negotiations back into the hands of terrorists." During the strike by its 6,300 drivers, Greyhound idled much of its fleet of 3,949 buses and cancelled 80% of its routes.

At the same time, Greyhound was having to contend with the rise of low-cost airlines such as Southwest Airlines, which further reduced the market for long-distance inter-city bus transportation. Without the financial strength provided in the past by a parent company, the strike's lower revenues and higher costs for security and labor-law penalties caused Greyhound to file for bankruptcy in June 1990. The strike was not settled until May 1993, 38 months later, under terms favorable to Greyhound. While the National Labor Relations Board (NLRB) had awarded damages for unfair labor practices to the strikers, this liability was discharged during bankruptcy reorganization. Greyhound agreed to pay $22 million in back wages to union drivers, recall 550 of the remaining strikers, reinstate most of the 200 strikers who were fired for alleged misconduct, and increase hourly pay for drivers to $16.55 from $13.83 by March 1998.

==== Early 1990s: bankruptcy and antitrust cases ====
In August 1991, Greyhound emerged from bankruptcy by which time it had shrunk its overall workforce to 7,900 employees from 12,000 pre-bankruptcy, and trimmed its fleet to 2,750 buses and 3,600 drivers.

In August 1992, Greyhound canceled its bus terminal license (BTL) agreements with other carriers at 200 terminals, and imposed the requirement that Greyhound be the sole-seller of the tenant's bus tickets within a 25-mile radius of such a Greyhound terminal. In 1995, the United States Department of Justice Antitrust Division brought suit to stop this practice, alleging that it was an illegal restraint of trade, bad for consumers, and reduced competition. In February 1996, the DOJ won its case, and Greyhound agreed to permit its tenants to sell tickets nearby and permit its tenants to honor interline tickets with competitors.

Greyhound's total revenues in 1994 were $616 million. At that time, the company was offering $10 fares due to competition.

In September 1998, Greyhound promised to make accommodations for disabled passengers, including equipping most buses with wheelchair lifts.

==== 2001: Trailways-Laidlaw mergers and bankruptcy ====
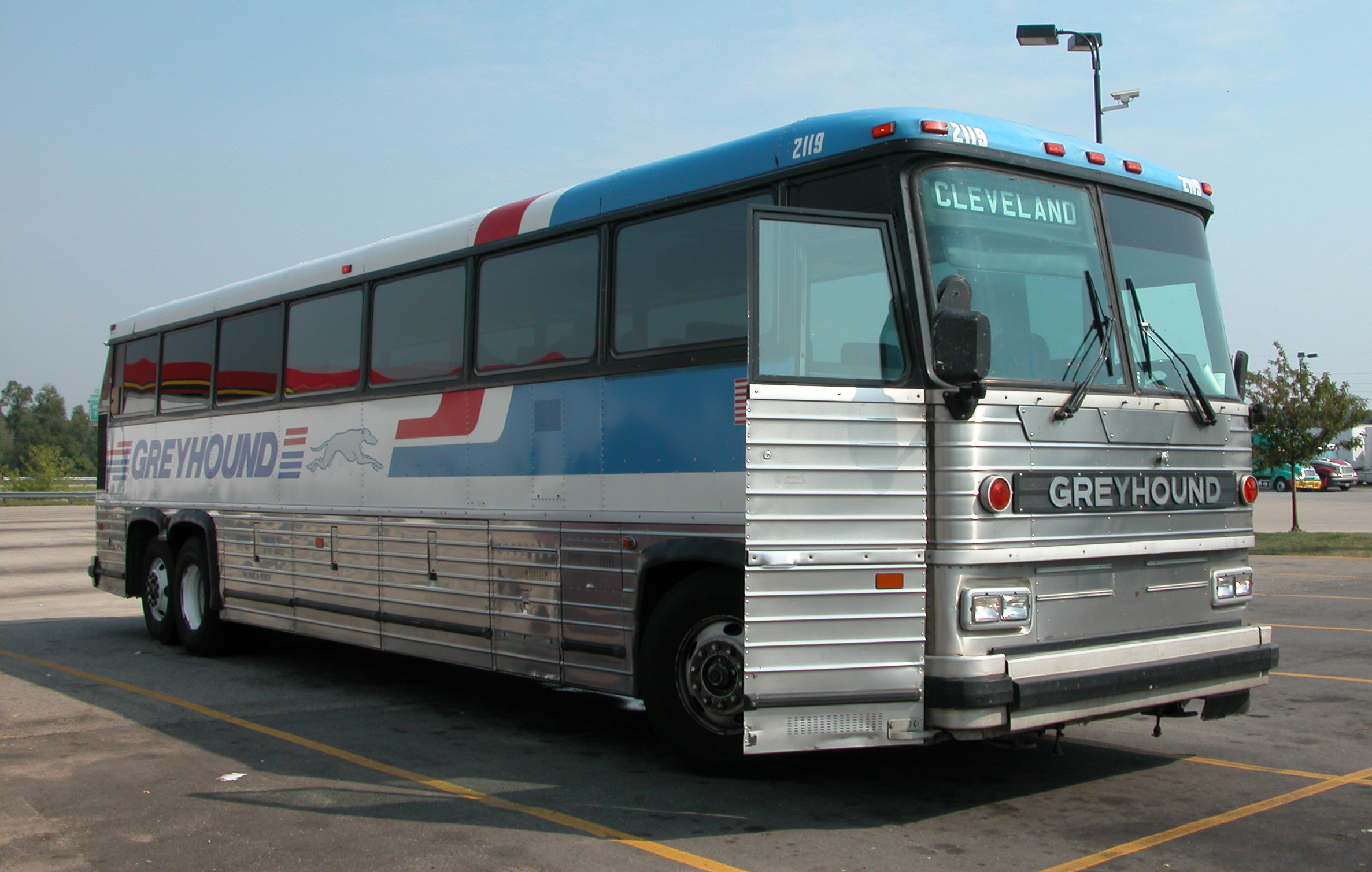
Greyhound MCI MC-12 Americruiser in Fremont, Indiana, August 2003

In the late 1990s, Greyhound Lines acquired two more members of the National Trailways Bus System. The company purchased Carolina Trailways in 1997, followed by the intercity operations of Southeastern Trailways in 1998. Following the acquisitions, most of the remaining members of the Trailways System began interlining cooperatively with Greyhound, discontinued their scheduled route services, diversified into charters and tours, or went out of business altogether.

On September 3, 1997, Burlington, Ontario–based transportation conglomerate Laidlaw announced it would buy Greyhound Canada, Greyhound's Canadian operations, for US$72 million.

In October 1998, Laidlaw announced it would acquire the U.S. operations of Greyhound Lines, Inc., including Carolina Trailways and other Greyhound affiliates, for about $470 million. The acquisition was completed in March 1999.

In June 2001, after incurring heavy losses through its investments in Greyhound Lines and other parts of its diversified business, Laidlaw filed for bankruptcy protection in both the U.S. and Canada.

=== 2002–2007: Laidlaw ownership ===
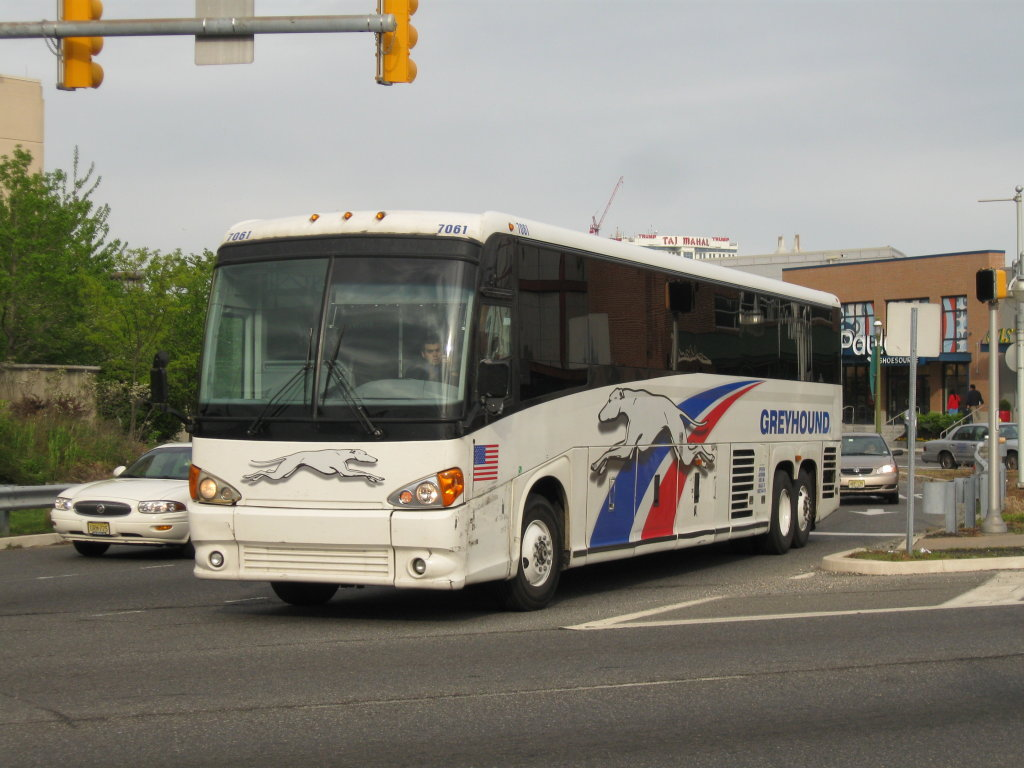
A Greyhound MCI G4500 in the early 2000s livery in Atlantic City, New Jersey

Naperville, Illinois–based Laidlaw International, Inc. listed its common shares on the New York Stock Exchange on February 10, 2003, and emerged from re-organization on June 23, 2003, as the successor to Laidlaw Inc.

By 2003, Greyhound faced significant competition in the northeast from Chinatown bus lines. More than 250 buses, operated by competitors such as Fung Wah Bus Transportation and Lucky Star Bus were competing fiercely from curbsides in the Chinatowns of New York City, Boston, Philadelphia, and Washington, D.C. When operating on inter-city routes, the Chinatown buses offered prices about 50% less than Greyhound's. Between 1997 and 2007, Chinatown buses took 60% of Greyhound's market share in the northeast United States.

In 2003, Greyhound expanded its QuickLink service, Greyhound's brand of commuter bus service that runs frequently during the peak weekday commuting hours. Routes were operated from Sacramento, California to the San Francisco Bay Area and Macon, Georgia to Atlanta.

In 2004, Greyhound dropped low-demand rural stops and started concentrating on dense, inter-metropolitan routes. It cut nearly 37% of its network. In some rural areas, particularly in the Plains states, parts of the upper Midwest (such as Wisconsin), and the Pacific Northwest, local operators took over the old stops, often with government subsidies. The Post House Cafeteria in Breezewood, Pennsylvania, closed the same year.

=== 2007–2021: FirstGroup ownership ===
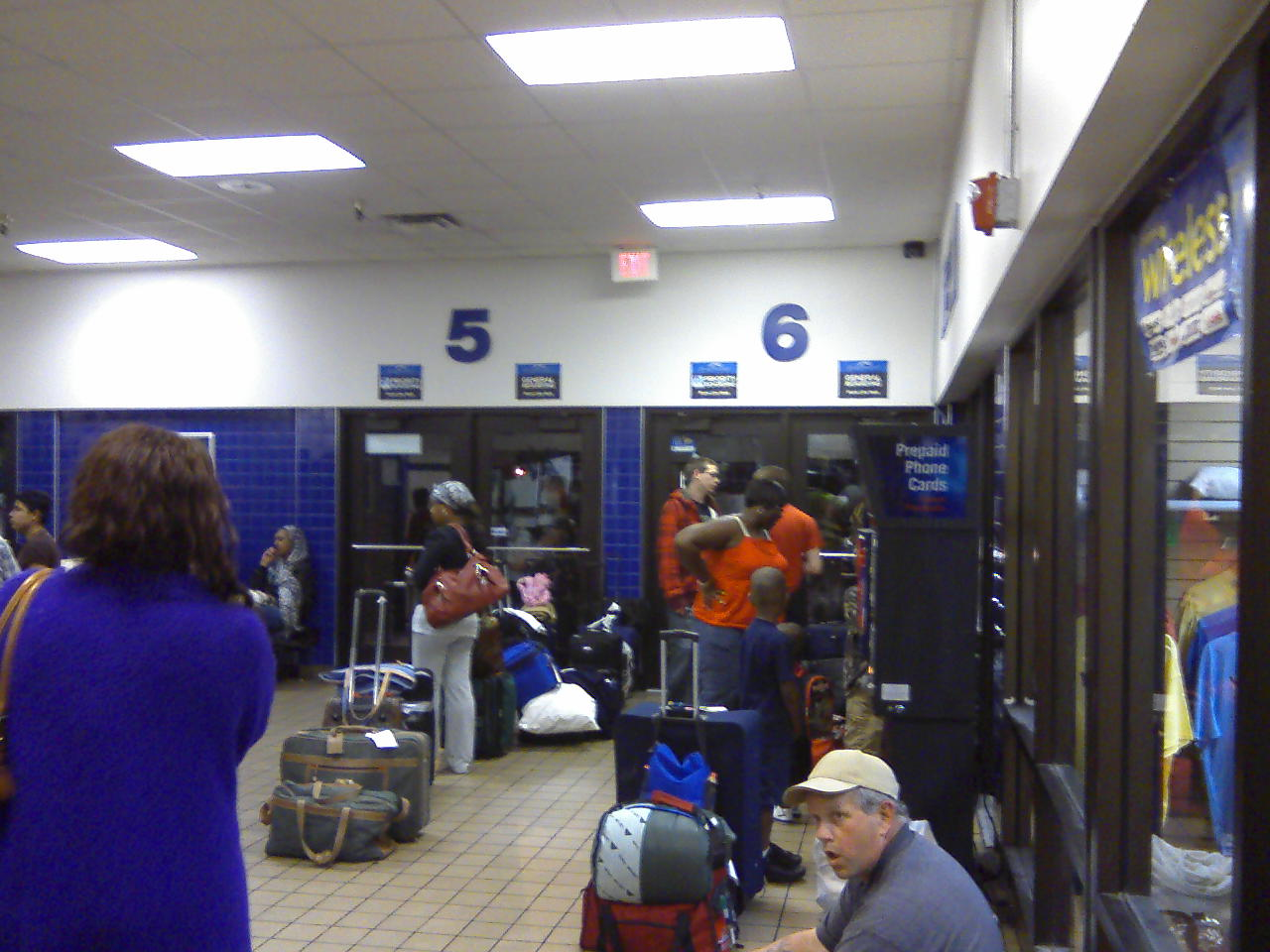
Inside a Greyhound bus station in Nashville, Tennessee, on the morning of May 24, 2010

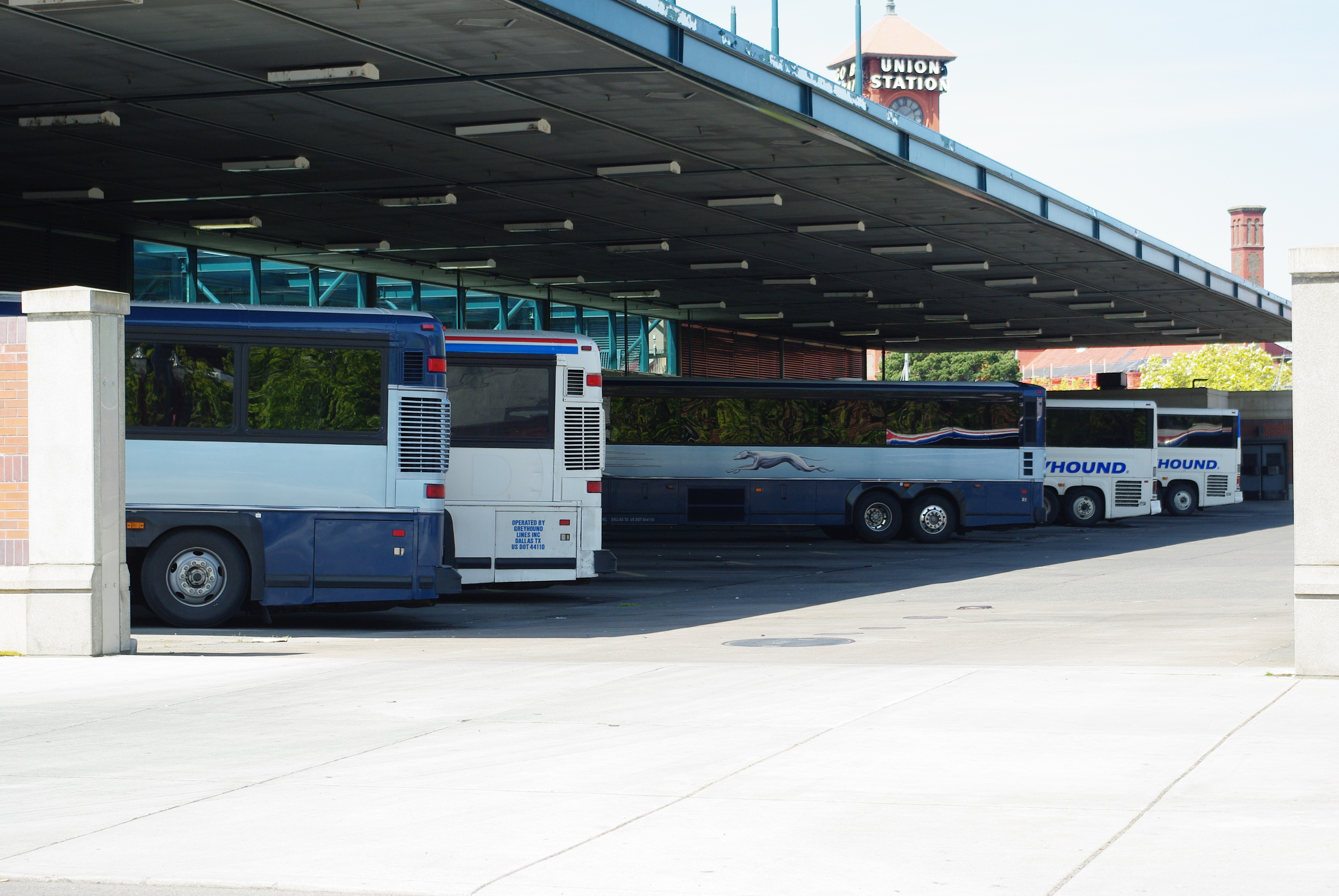
Greyhound buses at the Portland, Oregon, station

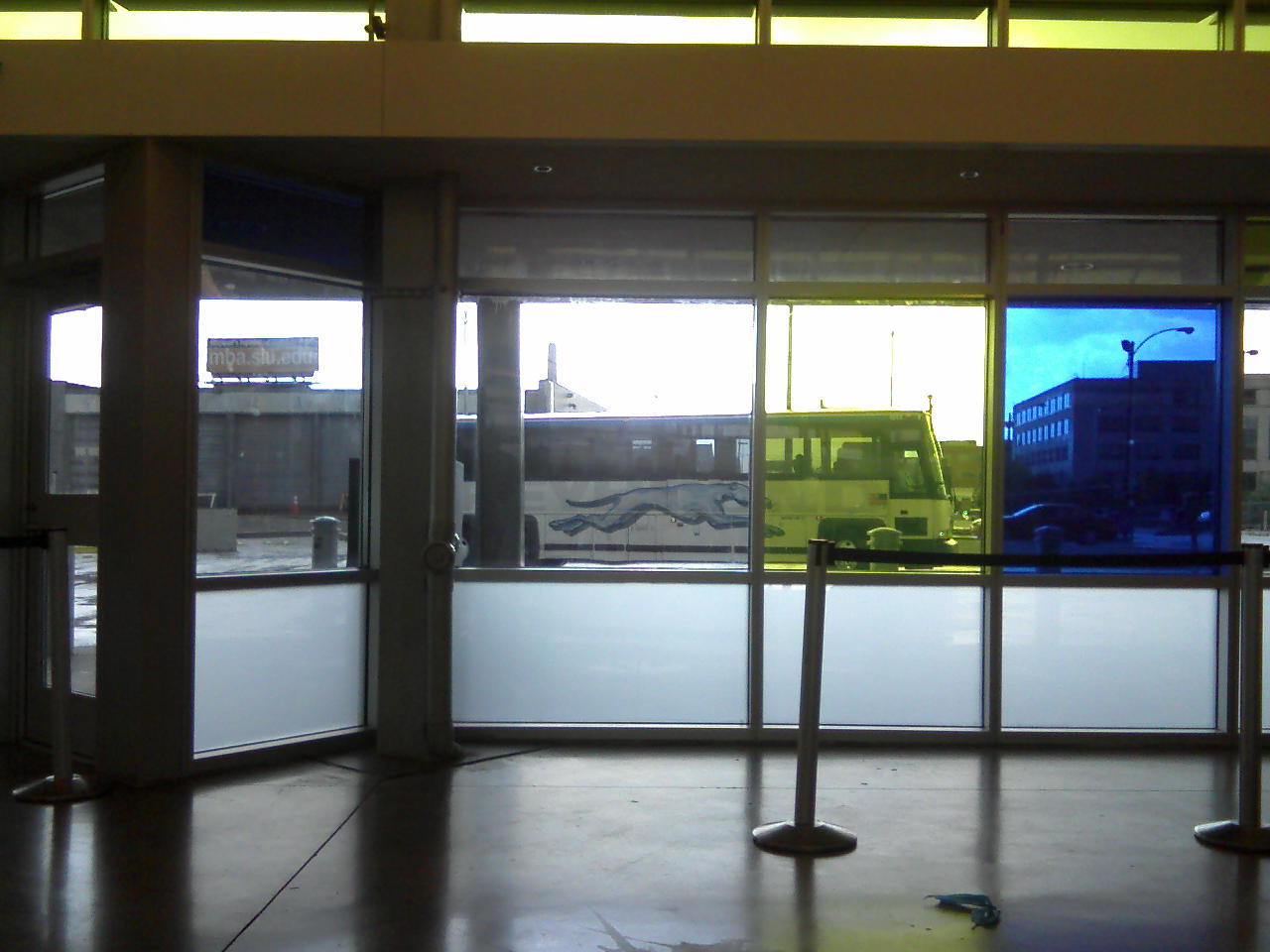
Inside the Greyhound station in St. Louis, Missouri, on the afternoon of May 26, 2010. A bus in the background on its way to pick up passengers at another gate at this station is bound for Los Angeles, California.

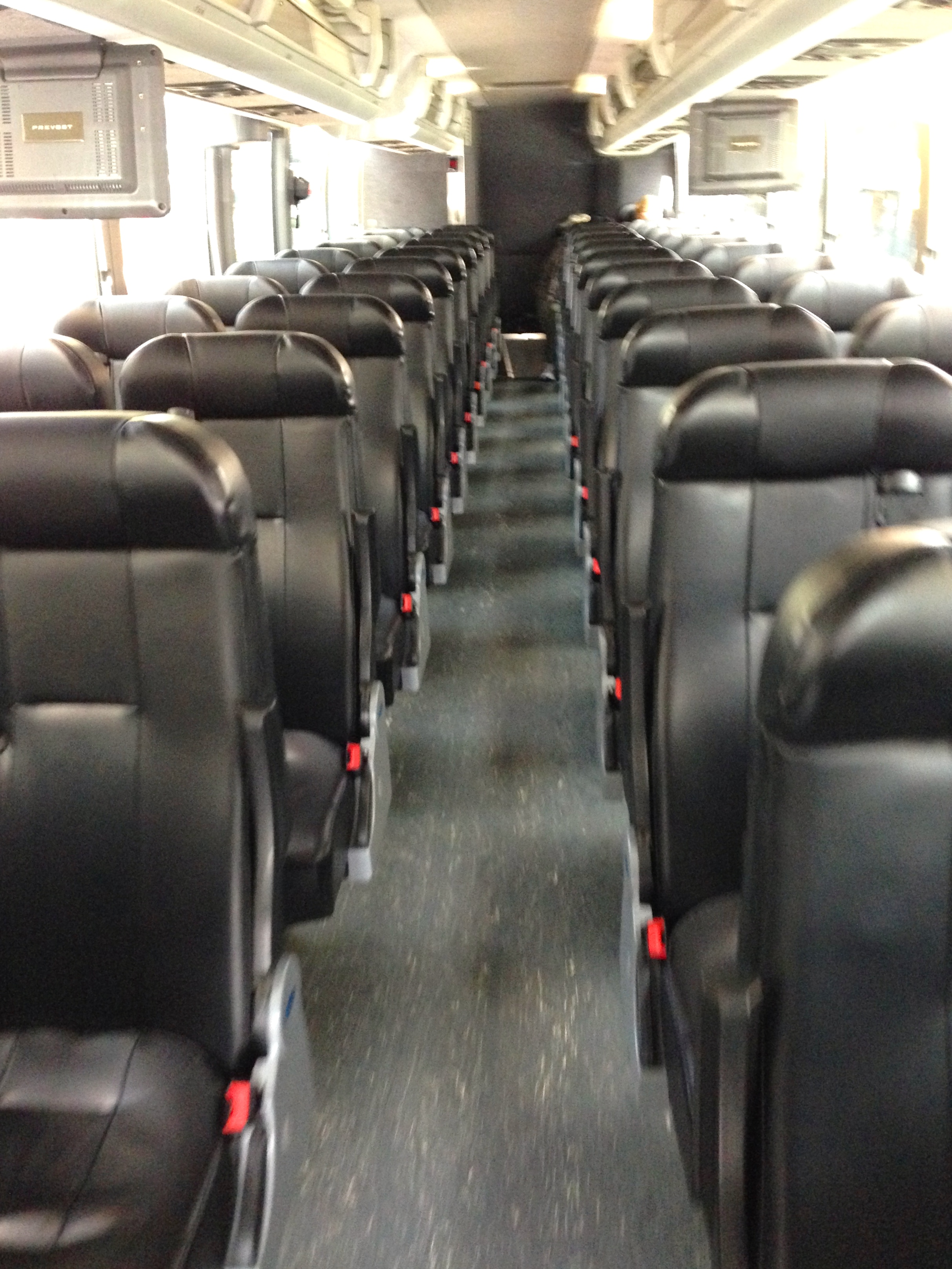
Interior of a 2009 Prevost X3-45 with leather seats

On February 7, 2007, Scottish transport group FirstGroup announced the acquisition of Laidlaw International for $3.6 billion, which closed on October 1, 2007.

Almost immediately after acquiring the carrier, FirstGroup sought to improve Greyhound's image by refurbishing many terminals, expanding the fleet with new buses, refurbishing old buses, and retraining customer service staff. Greyhound also started a new advertising campaign with Butler, Shine, Stern & Partners aimed at attracting 18- to 24-year-olds and Hispanics.

Although FirstGroup's interest was primarily the school and transit bus operations of Laidlaw, FirstGroup retained the Greyhound operations and in 2009 exported the brand to the United Kingdom as Greyhound UK (unrelated to bus operator Greyhound Motors which operated from 1921 to 1972).

In 2008, Greyhound's three regional bus operations (Carolina Trailways, based in Raleigh, N.C., Vermont Transit Lines of Burlington, Vermont, and Texas, New Mexico & Oklahoma Coaches of Lubbock, Texas ["T.N.M.&O."]) were consolidated into Greyhound Lines.

On March 27, 2008, Greyhound launched service under the BoltBus brand. The first buses started running between Boston, New York City, and Washington, D.C. In the Northeastern U.S., BoltBus was originally operated in partnership with Peter Pan Bus Lines, but this arrangement ended on September 27, 2017, with Greyhound continuing the brand alone. BoltBus expanded to the West Coast in May 2012 with a route in the Pacific Northwest between Vancouver, BC, Seattle, and Portland. Service was expanded again in October 2013 with a route between the two largest metropolitan areas in California, Los Angeles and the San Francisco Bay Area (San Jose and Oakland). A stop in San Francisco was added in December 2013 along with a route between Los Angeles and Las Vegas.

Beginning in 2009, all buses purchased have three-point seat belts installed.

In 2010, in response to competition from Megabus and Chinatown bus lines, the company launched "Greyhound Express", featuring newer buses and fewer stops.

In February 2013, in partnership with DriveCam, Greyhound deployed video cameras across its entire fleet to increase safety and driver compliance by combining data and video analytics with real-time driver feedback and coaching.

As of 2014, Greyhound's 1,229 buses served over 3,800 destinations in North America, traveling 5.5 billion miles (8.8 billion km) on North America's roads.

In 2014, the company introduced a refreshed logo and a new navy blue and dark gray livery for buses. Buses were refurbished to add wireless Internet access, power outlets, and leather seating with increased legroom.

Before 2014, Greyhound was criticized for overbooking, often leaving passengers to wait for the next bus departure. Shortly after the sale to FirstGroup closed, Greyhound began a program in select markets, where riders could reserve a seat for an additional $5. However, only a limited number of seats could be reserved and the fee would have to be paid at the terminal's ticketing counter, even if the ticket was bought in advance online. In 2014, Greyhound rolled out a new yield management computer system, enabling the company to more closely manage the number of tickets sold for each departure and dynamically adjust pricing based on sales. Although the amount of overbooked buses has been sharply reduced with this new system, Greyhound still does not explicitly guarantee a seat to everyone with a ticket (except on Greyhound Express routes).

In 2014, Greyhound reported a profit of $73 million on revenues of $990.6 million, and attributed the company's success to a mix of changing urban populations and a focus on more profitable routes with higher demand.

In 2013–2015, Greyhound expanded its Greyhound Connect service, which operates shorter routes to take passengers from stops in smaller, rural cities to stations in larger, urban cities. Some routes are operated using funds from the "Federal Formula Grant Program for Rural Areas" from the Federal Transit Administration.

In July 2015, the company announced that it would open terminals in Monterrey and Nuevo Laredo, Mexico, and begin service between the two cities and Texas, claiming to be the first American bus company to operate an intra-Mexican route. In September 2015, Greyhound announced expanded service in Missouri and Kansas shortly after Megabus announced that it would be ending service to several cities and college campuses.

The company's Lucky Streak brand is for routes to/from cities with casinos. All fares are sold as open-ended round-trips, with passengers allowed to return to their origin at any time. On the Atlantic City routes, casinos offer special bonuses (gambling credit, room/dining discounts) to Lucky Streak passengers. Lucky Streak routes serve Atlantic City (to/from Baltimore, Brooklyn, New York City, Philadelphia, and Washington, D.C.), Connecticut (Mohegan Sun & Foxwoods Casino) (to/from Boston, Bridgeport, New Haven, New York City, Providence, and Stamford), and Las Vegas (to/from Anaheim, Barstow, Claremont, Compton, El Monte, Hollywood, Long Beach, Los Angeles, Phoenix, Riverside, San Bernardino, San Diego, Santa Ana, and Victorville).

In February 2020, the company reversed its position regarding unwarranted searches and notified the Department of Homeland Security that it no longer would allow unwarranted searches on its buses, in areas of terminals, company offices, or any area where a person needs a ticket for access.

In December 2020, the company sold the customer terminal facility in Los Angeles, as well as facilities in Denver, Colorado, and Ottawa, Canada for a total of $137 million. The facility in Denver was sold for $38 million.

In May 2021, Greyhound Canada shut down all of its bus routes in Canada. Greyhound Lines continues to operate four cross-border routes that either start or finish in the U.S. from Toronto, Montreal, and Vancouver: the company also placed 38 buses used by its Canada division up for auction.

In July 2021, BoltBus suspended operations indefinitely and Greyhound took over all routes.

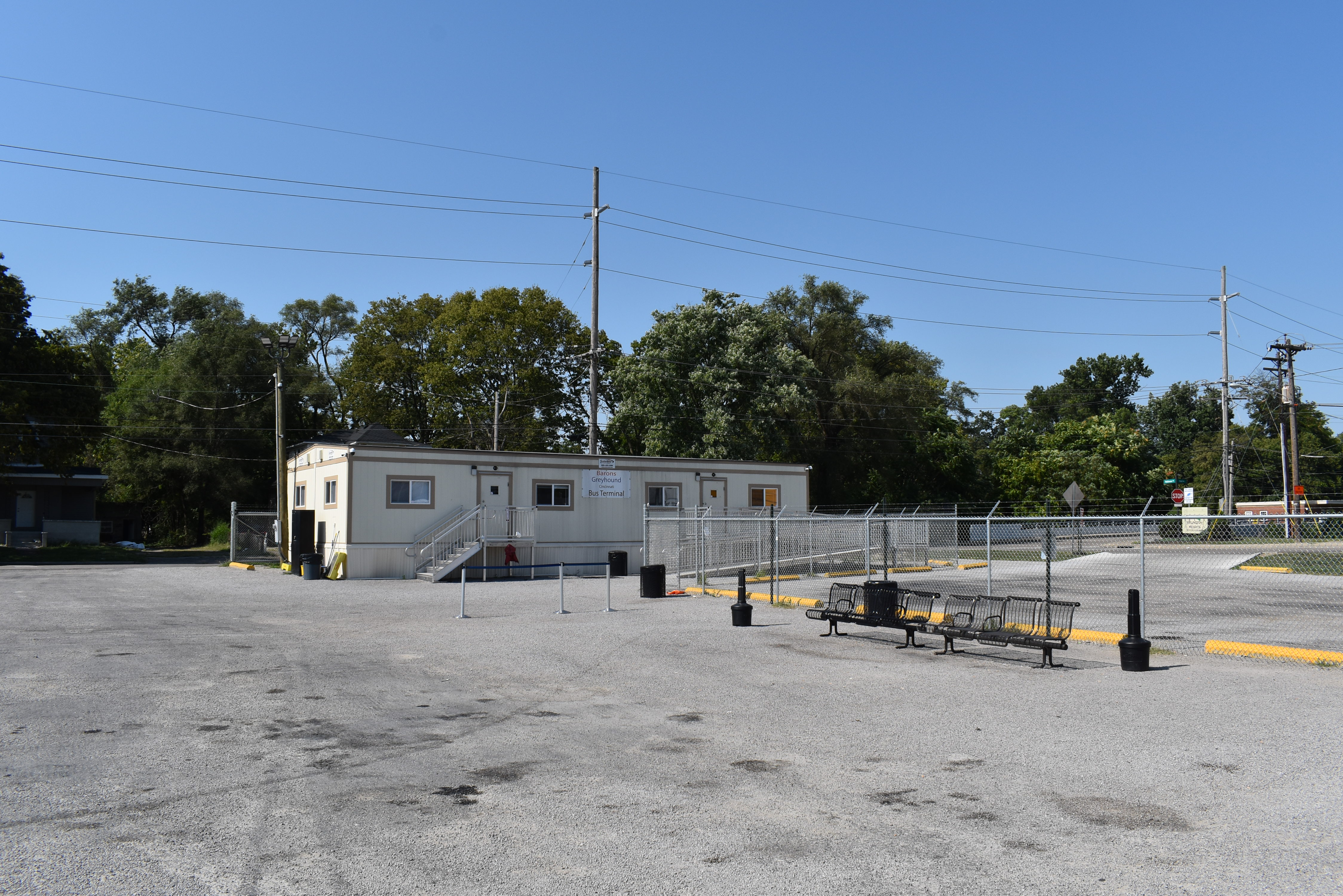
Greyhound's station in central Cincinnati was sold in 2021 and replaced by a smaller facility (pictured) in the suburb of Arlington Heights

In July 2021, the bus station in Columbus, Ohio, was sold to the Central Ohio Transit Authority for $9.5 million. In October 2021, the bus station in Downtown Louisville was sold for $2.8 million. The bus station in Cincinnati was sold to a real estate company for $4.25 million, with plans to convert it to parking.

In September 2021, the company agreed to pay $2.2 million to settle a lawsuit over its practice of allowing U.S. Customs and Border Protection agents to board its buses in Washington State to conduct warrantless immigration sweeps. The company had been criticized for allowing government officials to arrest its customers who were illegally in the country.

=== 2021–present: FlixMobility ===
On October 21, 2021, Germany-based Flix SE, owner of FlixBus, acquired Greyhound for $78 million.

In 2022, FirstGroup sold almost all its remaining Greyhound properties to Twenty Lake Holdings LLC, a subsidiary of Alden Global Capital, for approximately $140 million. Several bus stops were relocated, leading to criticism.

== Notable incidents and collisions ==
Below is a list of major incidents and collisions on Greyhound buses and buses of subsidiaries in the United States.

- August 4, 1952: in Greyhound's most deadly collision, two Greyhound buses collided head-on with each other along U.S. Route 81 near Waco, Texas. The fuel tanks of both buses then ruptured, bursting into flames. Of the 56 persons aboard both coaches, 28 were killed, including both drivers.
- January 4, 1957: Shortly after 7 pm Friday (01/04/1957), a Greyhound Scenicruiser collided with a disabled tractor-trailer truck on US 11 north of Lexington VA. The northbound bus was en route from Memphis to New York City. Among the passengers, there were six killed and 34 injured.
- May 13, 1972: near Bean Station, Tennessee, between Knoxville and Bristol, a Greyhound Scenicruiser on a scheduled trip from Memphis to New York City collided head-on with a tractor-trailer truck. The driver of the bus had begun to pass a car. Fourteen people, including both the bus and truck drivers, died. The National Transportation Safety Board determined that the cause of the crash was the Greyhound driver's overtaking maneuver and his failure to avoid the truck.
- May 9, 1980: the cargo ship MV Summit Venture collided with the Sunshine Skyway Bridge, near St. Petersburg, Florida, causing a part of the roadway to collapse and causing several vehicles, including a Greyhound bus, to fall into Tampa Bay. All 26 people aboard the bus died, as did nine others.
- December 18, 1990: a Greyhound bus left Salt Lake City for Chicago and was caught in a driving snowstorm on I-80. Just short of the Wyoming border, the bus was hit by a semi-tractor trailer that had crossed the median heading in the opposite direction. The force of the collision tipped the bus onto its right side and it fell down a steep embankment. The bus slid for 150 feet and came to rest against a fence, about 35 feet below the eastbound lanes of I-80. Seven passengers were killed and more than 40 injured.
- June 20, 1998: a Greyhound bus on a scheduled trip from New York City to Pittsburgh ran off a road near Burnt Cabins, Pennsylvania, and hit a truck parked in an emergency parking area. Six passengers and the driver died. The National Transportation Safety Board determined that the probable cause of the collision was the driver's use of a sedating antihistamine and driver fatigue, due to an irregular work-rest schedule.
- October 3, 2001: in the 2001 Greyhound bus attack, at approximately 4:15 a.m. local time, a passenger, Damir Igric, assaulted the driver of his bus, attempting to slit his throat, and causing the bus to crash near Manchester, Tennessee, killing Igric himself and five other passengers and injuring 32 others. Since the incident occurred three weeks after the September 11 terrorist attacks, Greyhound temporarily suspended all schedules as soon as the company learned of the incident for fear that it may have been part of a larger coordinated attack. After investigation by the company and the FBI, it was confirmed that Igric had acted alone and service resumed later that afternoon. After the incident, Greyhound bus stations increased security, though not nearly to the same level as airports or train stations.
- September 30, 2002: Arturo Martinez Tapia assaulted a Greyhound driver near Fresno, California, resulting in two passenger deaths after the bus rolled off an embankment and crashed. Following this attack, an aisle gate and driver's shield were installed on most Greyhound buses to prevent passengers from having direct contact with the driver when the bus is in motion, even if the aisle gate is forced open. The project was funded by a $16 million grant from the Transportation Security Administration.
- January 23, 2014: Maquel Donyel Morris, who was reportedly hallucinating, screamed "everybody's going to die," attacked the driver, and grabbed the steering wheel of a bus traveling on Interstate 10 near Tonopah, Arizona, 50 miles (80 km) west of Phoenix. 24 passengers were injured, including 21 who were airlifted to nearby hospitals. Police credited the driver for keeping the bus upright and preventing it from crossing into oncoming traffic.
- January 19, 2016: an overnight bus carrying 20 passengers that had departed from Los Angeles the previous night crashed on Highway 101 in San Jose, California, killing two and hospitalizing eight others. The National Transportation Safety Board determined that the probable cause of the crash was the failure of the California Department of Transportation to properly delineate the crash attenuator and the gore area.
- July 12, 2018: on a bus traveling from Columbus to Cincinnati, Ohio, three Colombian athletes on the Comunidad el Oso Ultimate club claimed they were thrown off one of the buses for speaking Spanish. Greyhound indicated the players had become unruly because they were not dropped off where they wanted to be dropped off, which was a place other than their ticketed destination. The driver left them and all their luggage at a gas station. The players were traveling to the World Flying Disc Federation's World Ultimate Club Championships. They were picked up by the Ohio police soon after and dropped off at their hotel in Cincinnati.
- August 30, 2018: a Greyhound bus traveling from St. Louis to Los Angeles was involved in a collision with a semi-truck on Interstate 40 westbound near Thoreau, New Mexico. One of the tires on the eastbound truck blew out and caused the driver to lose control and cross the median, colliding with the bus. Of the 48 on board, 8 people, including the driver, were killed, and several more sustained injuries.
- February 3, 2020: one person was killed and five others were injured when a passenger opened fire on a bus heading from Los Angeles to San Francisco. At the time of the shooting, the bus was travelling northbound on Interstate 5 near Grapevine, California. After the shooting, the driver pulled to the side of the highway and convinced the shooter to get off the bus. The driver then continued down the highway to a gas station to get medical assistance for the injured passengers. The suspect, still on the side of the highway, was later arrested without incident.
- February 2, 2022: one person was killed and four others were injured when a fellow passenger opened fire on them as they exited a Los Angeles-bound bus after it stopped at a convenience store in the city of Oroville, California. Passengers reported that, earlier in the trip, the suspect exhibited paranoid behavior and showed the firearm he had in a bag on the bus. After the shooting, the suspect dropped the gun and ran into a Walmart, where he was found naked and arrested after getting into a fight.
- July 12, 2023: shortly before 2 a.m., a westbound Greyhound bus, traveling from Indianapolis to St. Louis, struck three semi tractor trailers parked along the I-70 Silver Lake rest area exit ramp near Highland, Illinois. Three people were killed and 14 were seriously injured; four injured passengers were taken by helicopter to hospitals, the rest by ambulance. Although Illinois law prohibits trucks from parking along exit ramps, industry observers say there has been a nationwide shortage of overnight parking places. The National Transportation Safety Board reported that driver fatigue was the primary cause of the crash.

== See also ==
- Intercity bus service in the United States
- List of Greyhound Bus stations

Former operating subsidiaries

- Atlantic Greyhound Lines
- Capitol Greyhound Lines
- Dixie Greyhound Lines
- Florida Greyhound Lines
- Great Lakes Greyhound Lines
- Greyhound Canada
- Southeastern Greyhound Lines
- Teche Greyhound Lines

Museums and preserved stations

- Freedom Rides Museum (Montgomery, Alabama)
- Greyhound Bus Museum (Hibbing, Minnesota)
- Old Greyhound Bus Station (Jackson, Mississippi) (private office)
- Old Greyhound Terminal (Washington, D.C.) (incorporated into building built on site)
