= Stait =

Stait is a surname. Notable people with the surname include:

- Brent Stait (born 1959), Canadian actor
- Carolyn Stait (born 1957), English Royal Navy officer
- Don Stait (1928–2007), Australian rugby league footballer

== See also ==
- Staite
- Strait (surname)
