= Strait (surname) =

People with the surname Strait include:

- Bob Strait (born 1949), American stock car racing driver
- Brian Strait (born 1988), American ice hockey defenseman
- Chris Strait (born 1976), American comedian and writer
- Derrick Strait (born 1980), American football player
- Edward M. Strait (1930–2008), American labor leader
- George Strait (born 1952), American country music singer, songwriter, actor, and music producer
- Guy Strait (1920–1987), American gay civil rights activist, magazine publisher, and convicted sex offender
- Harold G. Strait (1898–1983), American resident
- Horace B. Strait (1835–1894), American U.S. Representative from Minnesota
- Lynn Strait (1968–1998), American singer and songwriter
- Ralph Strait (1936–1992), American actor
- Robert Strait (born 1969), American football player
- Sonny Strait (born 1965), American voice actor, director, and writer
- Steven Strait (born 1986), American actor and singer
- Thomas J. Strait (1846–1924), American U.S. Representative from South Carolina

== See also ==
- Strait
