= George D. Brown (architect) =

American architect

George Dewey Brown (April 6, 1898 – July 27, 1968) was a 20th-century American architect who designed several historically significant bus stations for Greyhound Lines, including the Greyhound Bus Depot (Columbia, South Carolina) and the Atlantic Greyhound Bus Terminal station in Savannah, Georgia. Both of these stations are listed on the National Register of Historic Places for their architecture.

== Biography ==
Brown was born in 1898 in Sharpsville, Pennsylvania, the son of Irish immigrant James Brown, a blacksmith, and Mary Kemerer Brown. Practicing in Charleston, West Virginia, he designed stations in the Streamline Moderne style. He also designed the Greyhound station for state capitols in Charleston, West Virginia and on 412 E. Broad Street in Richmond, Virginia.

He died in Charleston, West Virginia, in 1968.

== Streamline Moderne buildings designed by George D. Brown ==
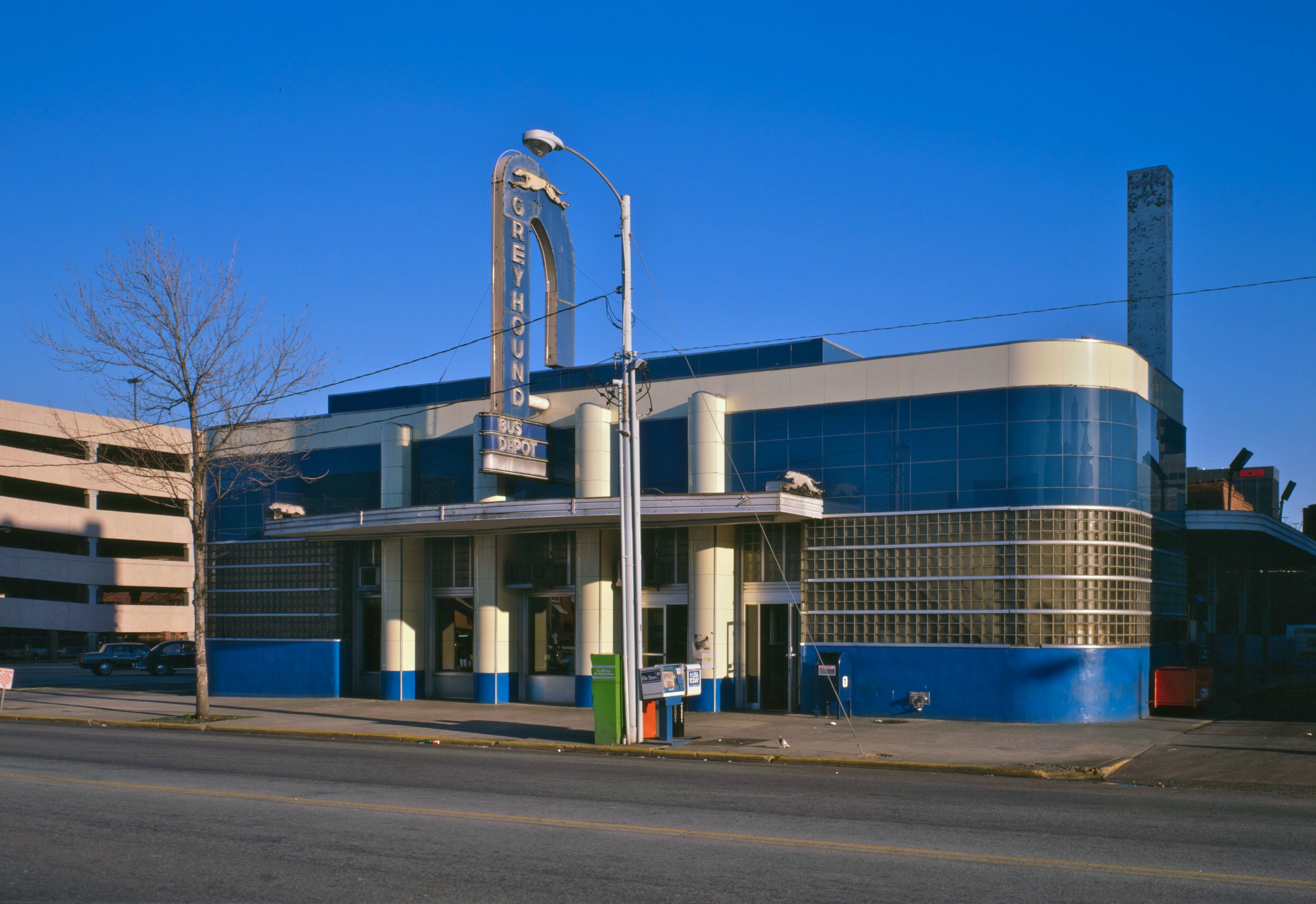
Greyhound Bus Depot (Columbia, South Carolina)

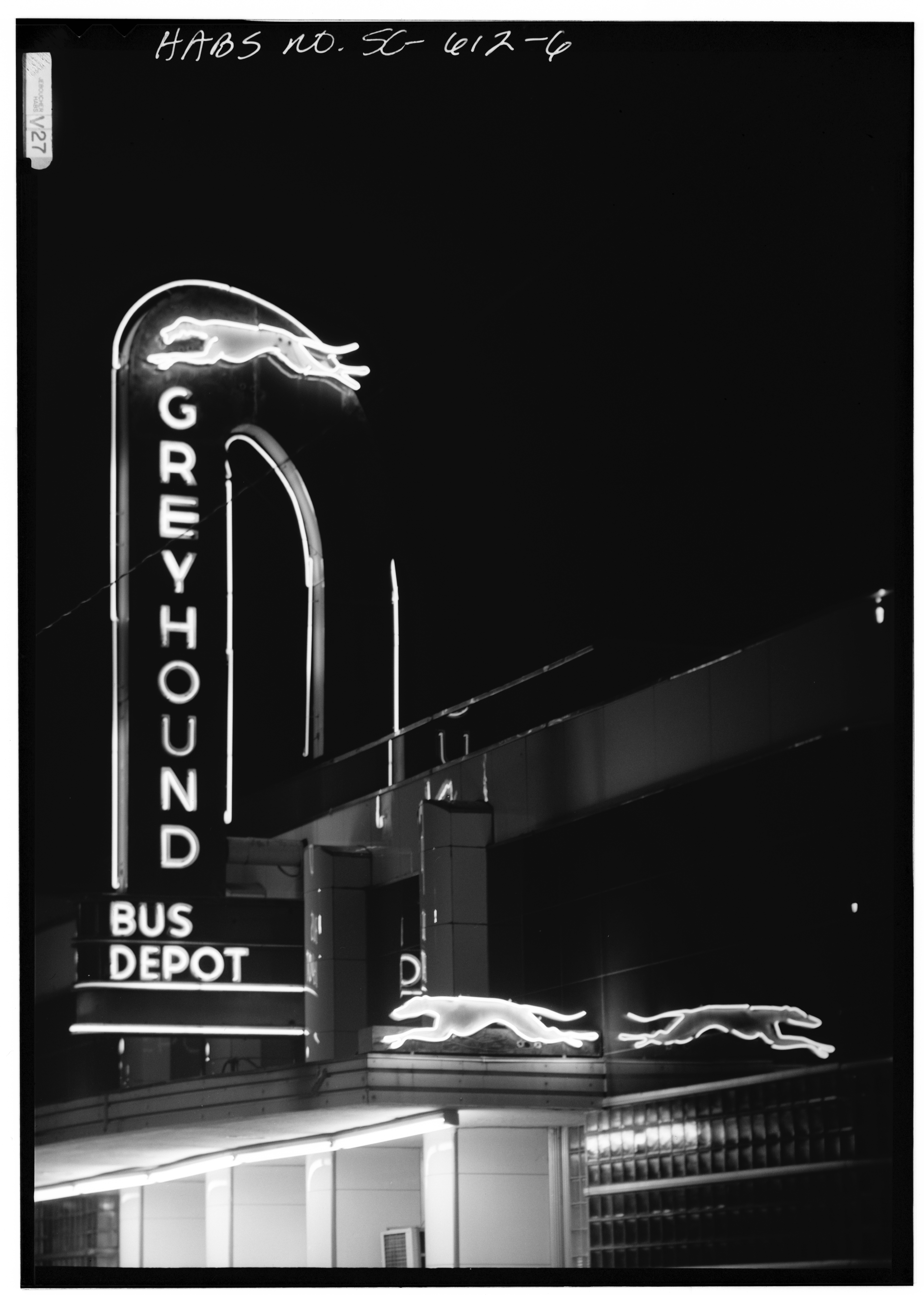
Neon sign detail, Columbia, South Carolina

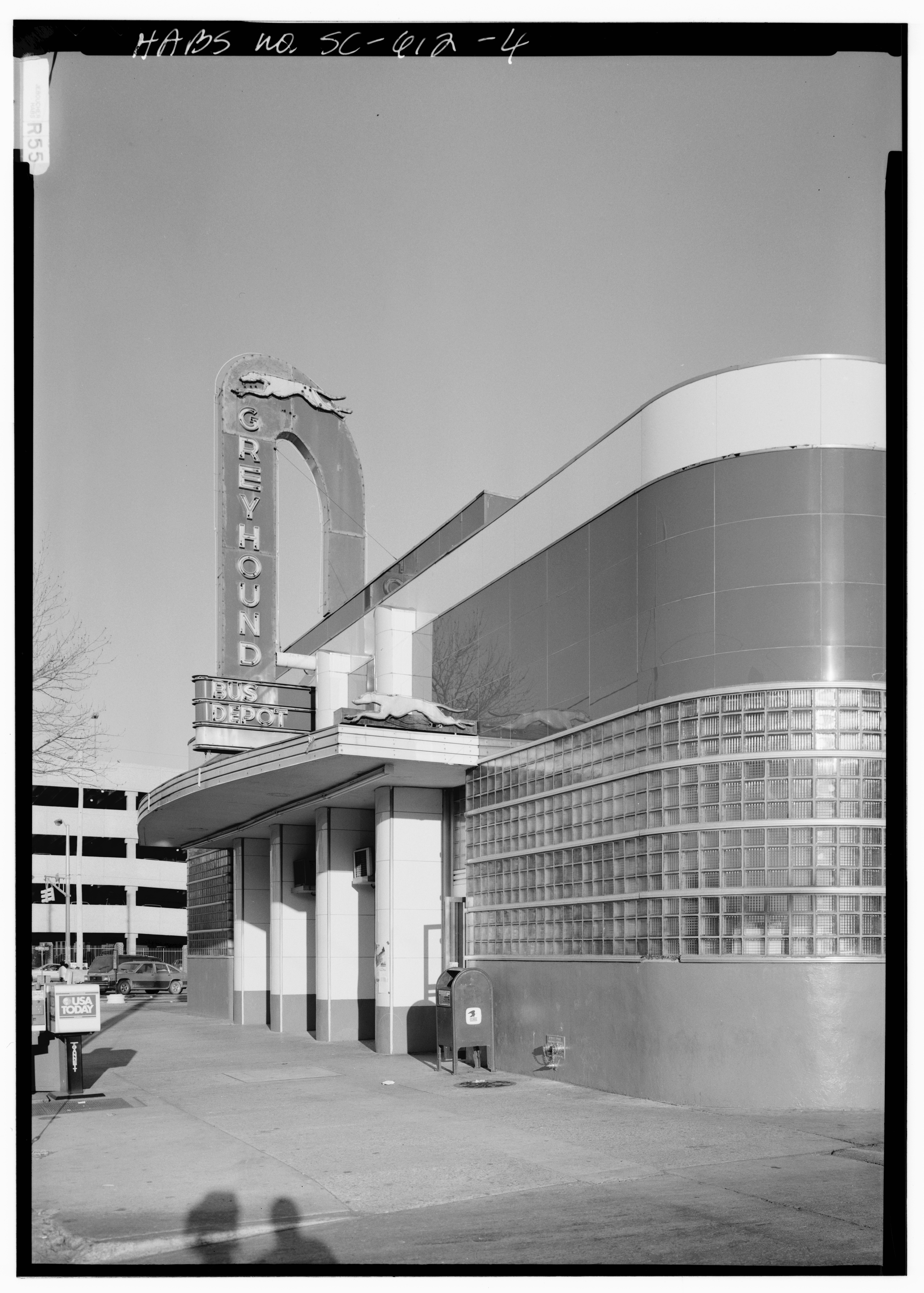
Northwest Facade, Columbia Greyhound Station

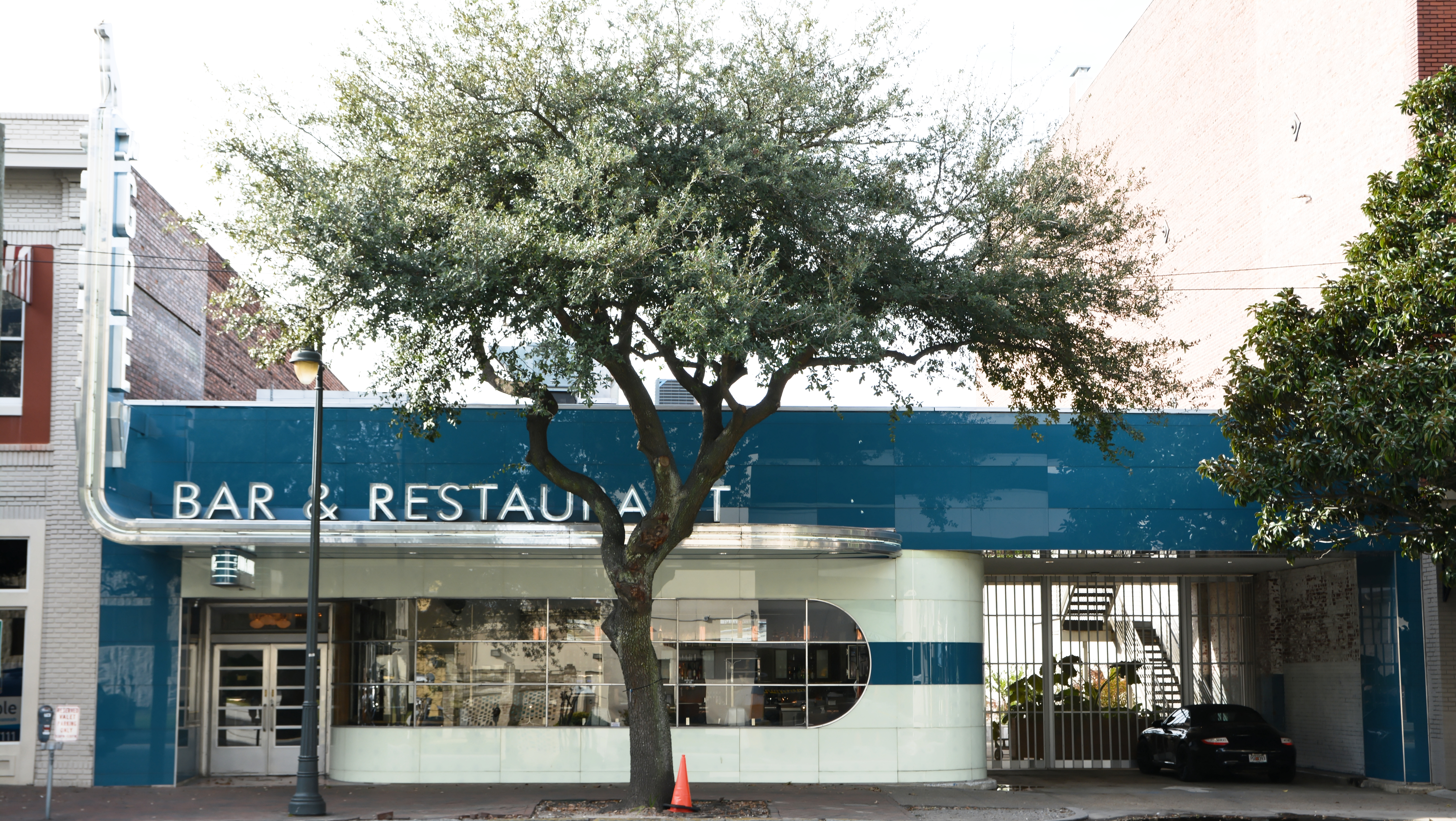
Greyhound Bus Station Atlantic Greyhound Bus Station, Savannah, Georgia

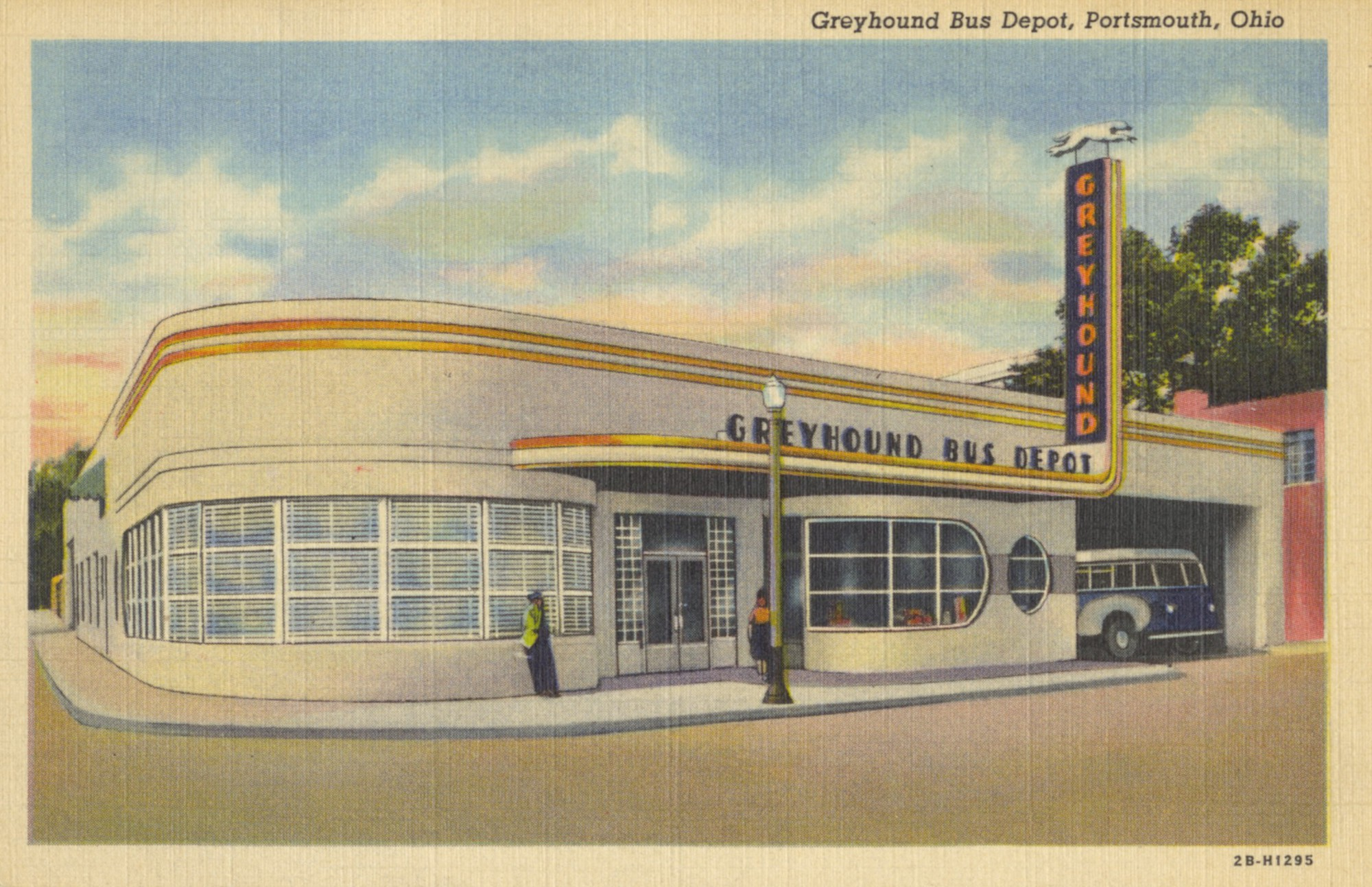
Greyhound Bus Station, Portsmouth Ohio (demolished)

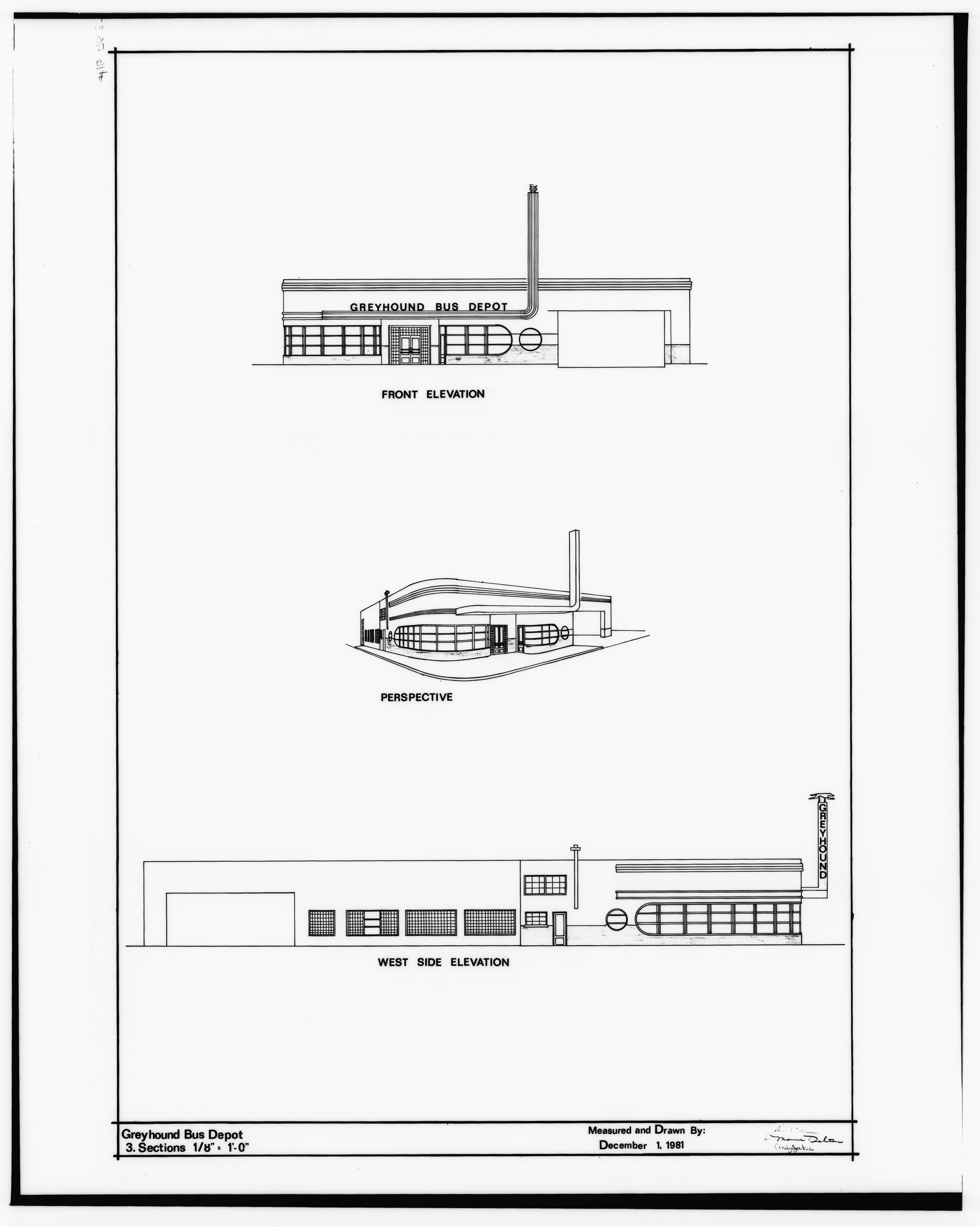
Greyhound Bus Station, Drawings, Portsmouth, Ohio,
Additional drawings, Library of Congress

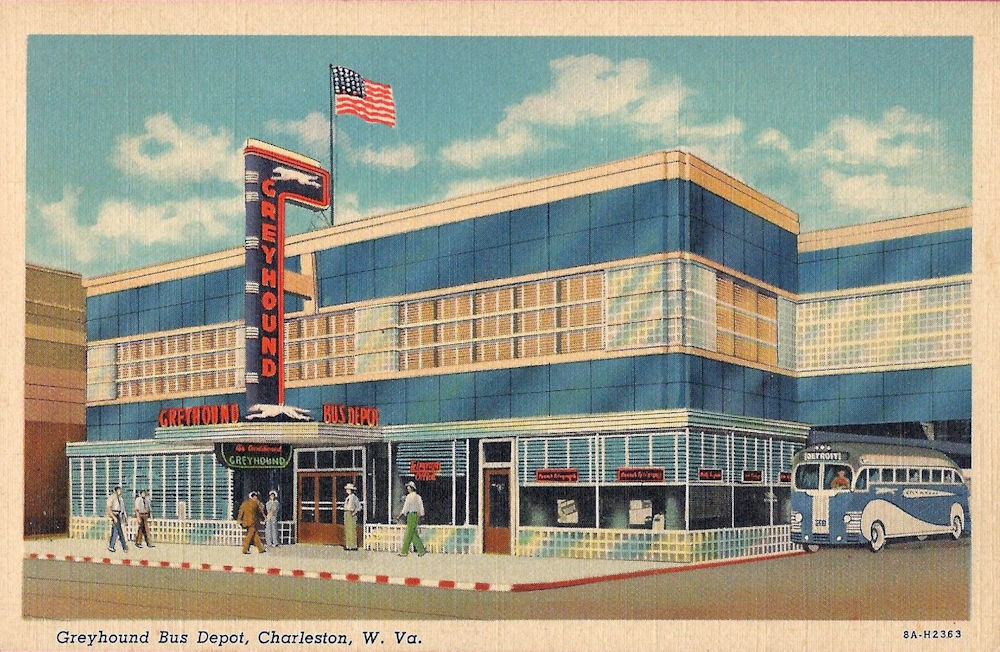
Greyhound station Charleston, West Virginia, c.1940

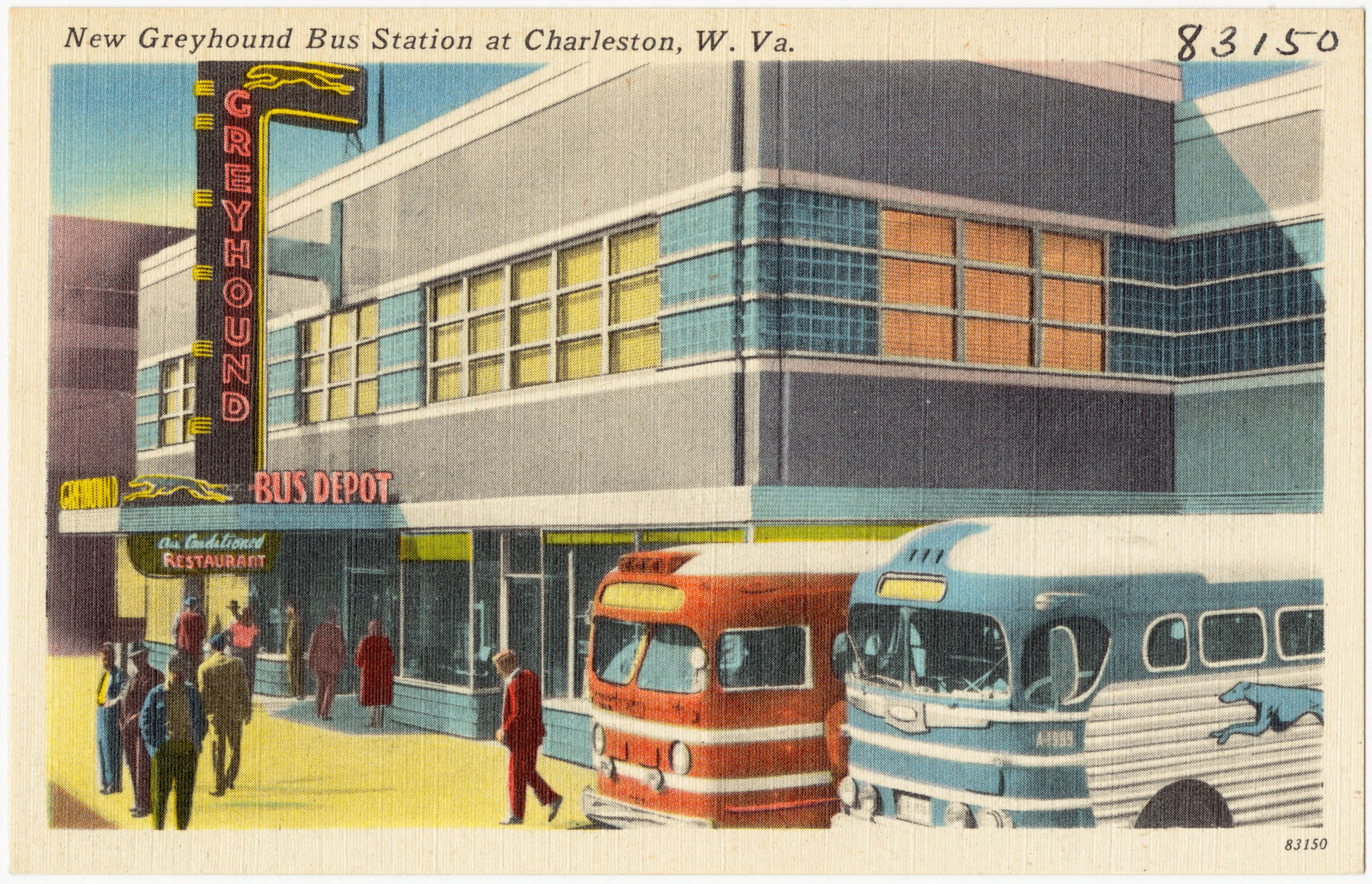
Greyhound Bus Station at Charleston, W. Va, side view

Greyhound Station Huntington, West Virginia
Interior views
