= Atlantic Greyhound Bus Terminal =

Historic bus terminal in Savannah, Georgia, US

- U.S. National Register of Historic Places
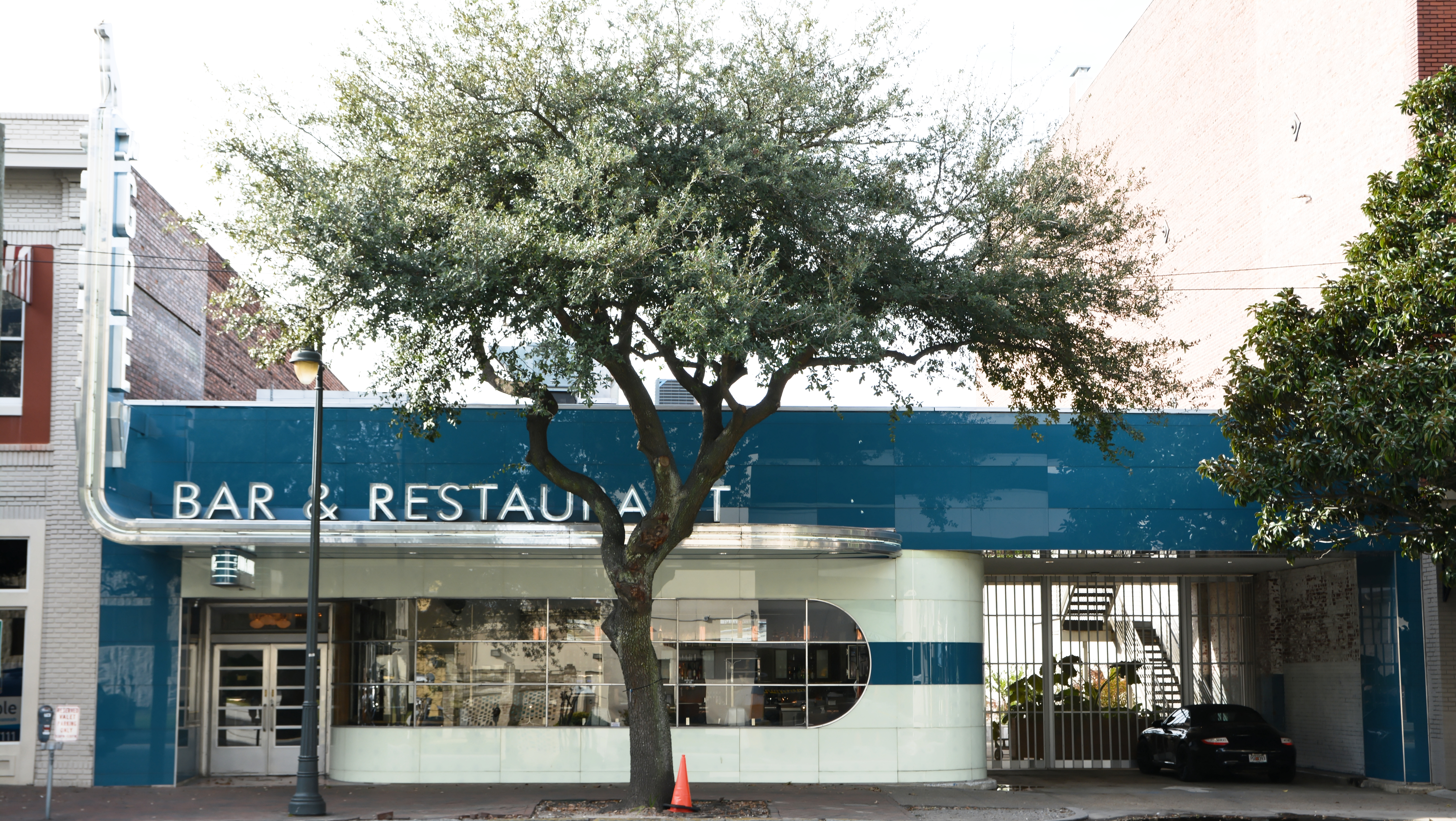

- Location within Georgia Location within the United States
- Location: Savannah, Georgia
- Coordinates: 32.079828°N 81.097621°W
- Area: less than one acre
- Built: 1938
- Architect: George D. Brown
- Architectural style: Streamline Moderne
- NRHP reference No.: 16000837
- Added to NRHP: December 13, 2016

The Atlantic Greyhound Bus Terminal, is located at 109 Martin Luther King, Jr. Blvd. in Savannah, Georgia. It was designed by architect George D. Brown in Streamline Moderne style. It was opened in 1938 and operated until 1965. It made intercity bus travel possible for residents of Savannah. The terminal was listed on the National Register of Historic Places in 2016. John Marisano bought the building and since 2018 it houses The Grey Bar & Restaurant.
