= Staite =

Staite is a surname. Notable people with the surname include:

- Jewel Staite (born 1982), Canadian actress
- Neil Staite (born 1963), British rower
- William Staite Murray (1881–1962), English studio potter

== See also ==
- Stait
