= Greyhound Bus Depot (Columbia, South Carolina) =

- U.S. National Register of Historic Places
- U.S. Historic district – Contributing property
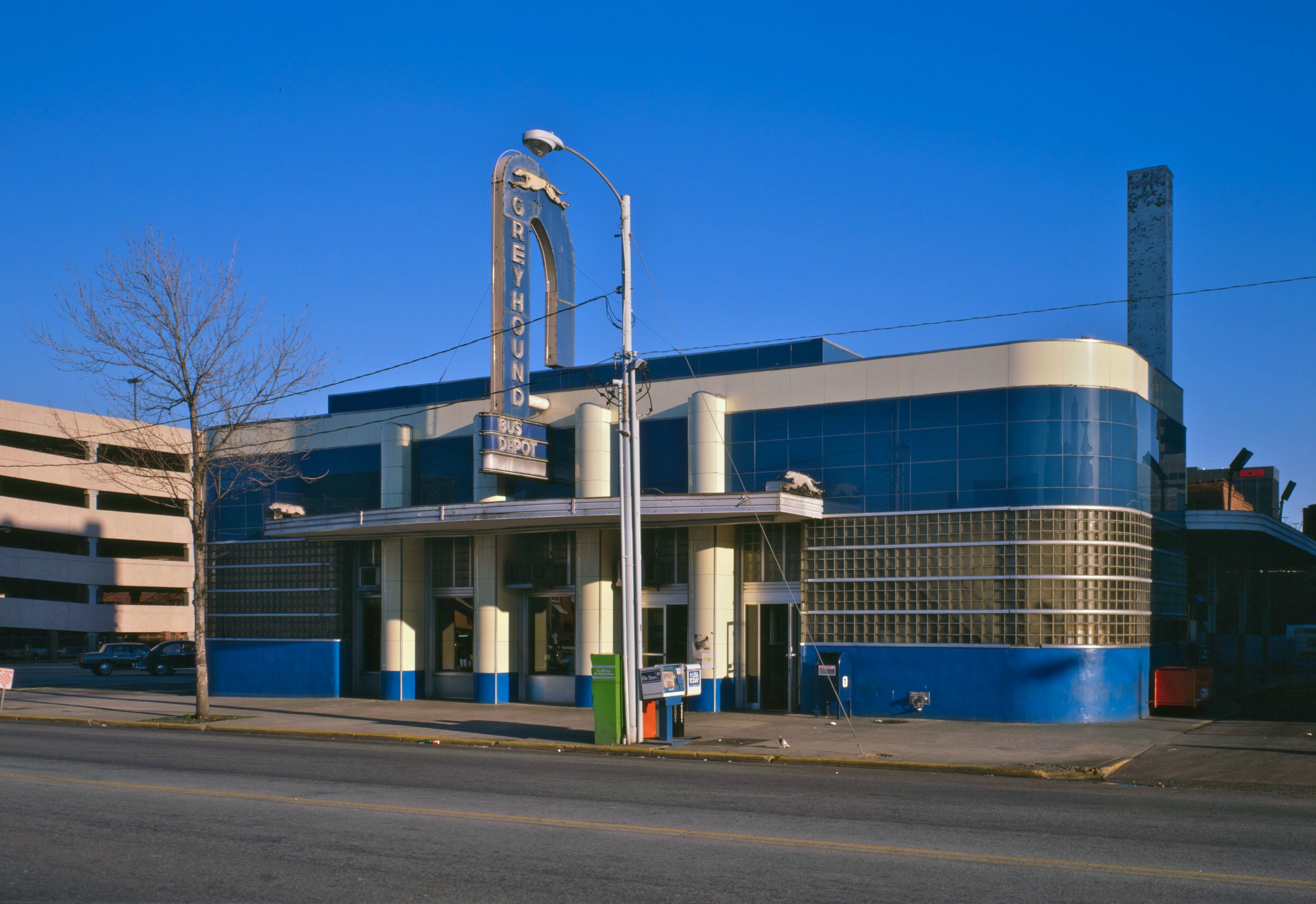
- Greyhound Bus Station in 1986

- Location within South Carolina Location within the United States
- Location: 1220 Blanding St., Columbia, South Carolina
- Coordinates: 34°0′29″N 81°2′8″W
- Built: 1938
- Architect: Brown, George D.
- Architectural style: Streamline Moderne
- Part of: Columbia Commercial Historic District (ID14000875)
- MPS: Columbia MRA
- NRHP reference No.: 82005383
- Added to NRHP: December 28, 1989

The Greyhound Bus Depot is a former Greyhound Lines intercity bus station in Columbia, South Carolina. It is at 1220 Blanding Street in downtown Columbia. The depot was named to the National Register of Historic Places on December 28, 1989. After the bus terminal was closed, the building became a bank. Currently, it is a physician's office.

== History ==
The building was constructed in 1938 and 1939 for Atlantic Greyhound Lines. The bus station was closed in 1987. In 1990, it was acquired by Lexington National Bank. They used the ticket windows as teller windows. After the bank left in 2000, the building was vacant. In 2005, the building was adapted for a plastic surgeon. Since 2014, the building has been a contributing property in the Columbia Commercial Historic District, which was listed on the NRHP on October 20, 2014.

== Architecture ==
The depot is an island-type station designed by George D. Brown in the Art Moderne or Streamline Moderne style, which grew out of the industrial design work of Norman Bel Geddes, Henry Dreyfuss, and Raymond Loewy. These designs emphasized a streamlined shape with minimal ornamentation.

The building has a reinforced concrete foundation and a structural steel frame. The east, west, and north elevations have three horizontal bands and rounded corners. The lower band is blue stucco. The middle band is glass block. The top band is blue and ivory Vitrolite panels. The north elevation on Blanding Street has four ivory Vitrolite columns extending through the canopy over the five entrance doors.

The vertical sign above the entrance was constructed of aluminum with stainless-steel trim. The sign was capped with the iconic "running greyhound" logo of the bus company. The letters in the words "Greyhound Bus Depot" and the running greyhound were outlined with neon tubing.

The original interior had a terrazzo floors, plaster walls, and wainscoting. The waiting room had a skylight for additional, natural lighting.

In its current use as a plastic surgeon's office, the exterior remains the same with the exception of the sign, which no longer has the Greyhound name or logo. The interior was redone with a patient waiting room, consultation room, a surgery suite, recovery rooms, and offices.
