= Yelloway-Pioneer System =

System of intercity bus companies

YellowaY-Pioneer System
- Founded: 1927 by Oliver William Townsend, Wesley E. Travis
- Service area: United States
- Service type: Intercity bus service
- Routes: Los Angeles - Philadelphia - New York

The Yelloway-Pioneer System (sometimes styled YellowaY-Pioneer) was a group of independently-owned intercity bus companies that operated the first transcontinental bus route in the United States.

Proposed in early 1927, the first transcontinental bus trip took place in 1928. The initial route ran from Los Angeles, California to Philadelphia, Pennsylvania. In September 1928, the route was extended from Philadelphia to New York City. The first Los Angeles to New York City trip was completed on September 11, 1928, covered 3,433 highway miles, and took 5 days and 14 hours to travel.

Also in 1928, the American Motor Transportation Company purchased most of the YellowaY member firms.

In February 1929, the Motor Transit Corporation (which became Greyhound Corporation later that year) bought the Yelloway-Pioneer System for $6.4 m million.
