= Edward M. Strait =

- Born: June 23, 1930
- Died: December 20, 2008 (aged 78)
- Occupation: Labor leader

Edward M. Strait (June 23, 1930 – December 20, 2008) was an American labor leader. He was President of the Amalgamated Council of Greyhound Local Unions, representing more than 9,300 employees, and head of the Amalgamated Transit Union's bargaining unit during the strike beginning March 2, 1990, and ending in April 1993. As Council President, Strait discussed the terms of all possible negotiations with the 16 local union presidents. Believing the company was motivated by a preconceived desire to bust the union, Strait explained that "they negotiated us into a strike. I think this has been planned. The company wants to get rid of the union."

Initial strike negotiations were stalled by acts of violence. While Greyhound CEO Fred Currey argued that "no American worth his salt negotiates with terrorists," Strait responded that management's failure to negotiate amounted to "putting the negotiations back into the hands of terrorists." Shortly after Currey declared "victory" and called the strike "irrelevant," Greyhound was forced to declare bankruptcy in June, 1990, which Strait predicted in a debate with Executive Vice President and Chief Negotiator Anthony Lannie on Jim Lehrer's NewsHour.

After Greyhound declared bankruptcy, Strait was primarily concerned with obtaining seniority rehiring for the striking workers, explaining, "They promised these scabs jobs. They just don't want to negotiate seniority. If you have a dollar amount, but no seniority, you don't have a job. Without seniority you don't have anything."

Prior to the 1990 strike, Strait was active in the 1983 Greyhound strike as president of Amalgamated Transit Union Local 1098 in Washington, DC. His initial involvement with Greyhound began when he began driving buses in the 1960s.

As a labor leader, Strait was a witness at the United States Senate Subcommittee on Labor Management Relations hearing for a bill designed to strengthen protections for striking workers.

Strait died on December 20, 2008, at the age of 78.
