= Greyhound Bus Museum =

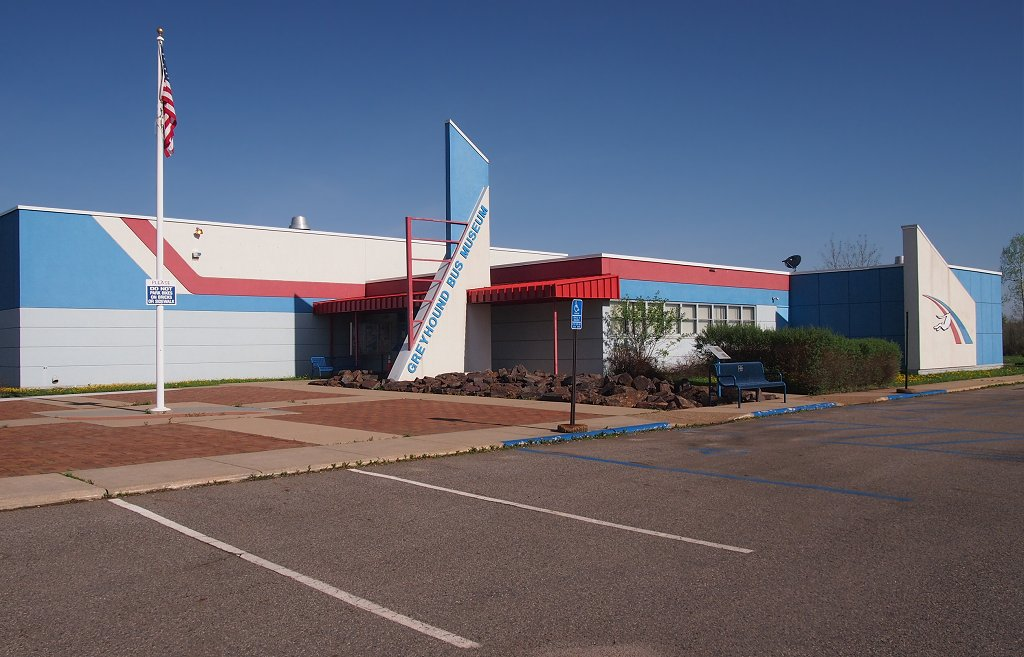
- The Greyhound Bus Museum from the southeast
- Established: 1989
- Location: 1201 Greyhound Boulevard; Hibbing, Minnesota, United States
- Coordinates: 47°26′18″N 92°56′22″W
- Type: Transport museum
- Website: http://www.greyhoundbusmuseum.org

The Greyhound Bus Museum is located in Hibbing, Minnesota, United States, where Carl Wickman and Andrew "Bus Andy" Anderson started their first bus service in 1914 transporting fellow miners in a 1914 Hupmobile.

== Company history ==
In 1914, Eric Wickman, a 27-year-old Swedish immigrant, started a transportation service with Andy "Bus Andy" Anderson and C. A. A. "Arvid" Heed to transport iron ore miners in Minnesota. By 1918, the company had 18 vehicles and merged with Ralph Bogan to form the Mesaba Transportation Company. Wickman later expanded the company to various locations and eventually rebranded it as The Greyhound Corporation in 1930.

== Museum history ==
The museum was established in September 1989 by Gene Nicolelli, a local resident who discovered a plaque honoring Hibbing as the birthplace of the bus industry in an abandoned Greyhound terminal.

Initially called the Greyhound Bus Origin Center and located in the Hibbing Municipal Building, the museum has grown to include a collection of historical buses and memorabilia related to the Greyhound Lines. .

== Exhibits ==
The museum houses a collection of artifacts and vehicles that chronicle the history of the Greyhound Lines bus company. Visitors can explore eighteen historical buses, including the very first Hupmobile used for passenger service in 1914. A diorama brings to life the bus building process in 1916, while hundreds of artifacts like uniforms, tickets, and photographs showcase the evolution of Greyhound travel. The museum also tells the story of the company's contribution to the World War II efforts.

== Historical vehicles ==
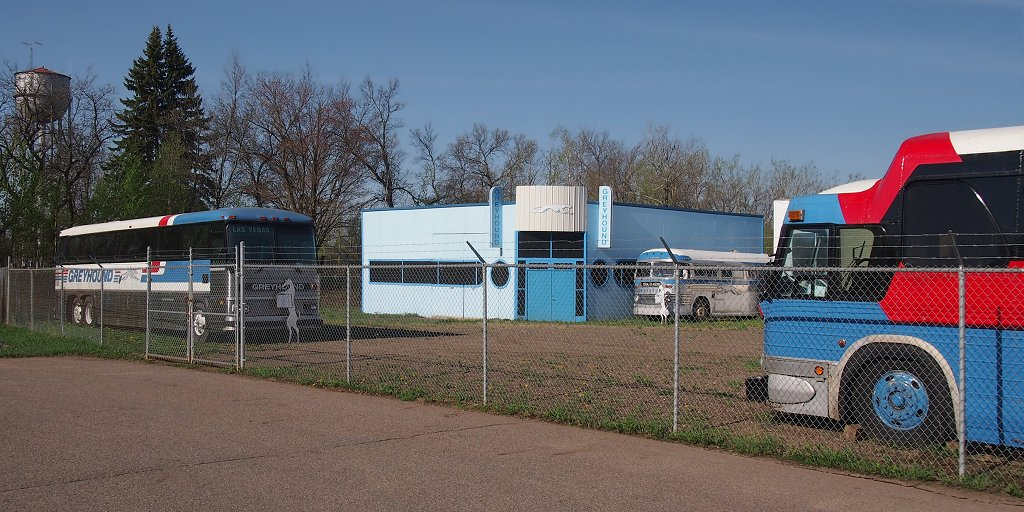
Some of the museum's bus collection

| Year | Make | Model |
|---|---|---|
| 1914 | Hupmobile | |
| 1927 | White | |
| 1936 | Yellow | 743 "Super Coach" |
| 1947 | Yellow | 743 "Battle of Britain" |
| 1947/48 | ACF | "Brill" |
| 1948 | GMC | PD-4151 "Silverside" |
| 1956 | MCI | Courier 96 |
| 1956 | GMC | PD-4501 "Scenicruiser" |
| 1964 | GMC | PD-4106 |
| 1967 | GMC | PD-4107 "Buffalo" |
| 1969 | GMC | PD-4903 "Buffalo" |
| 1977 | MCI | MC-8 "Americruiser" |
| 1982 | MCI | MC-9 |
| 1989 | Eagle | 10 |
| 1992 | MCI | MC-12 |

== Permanent exhibits ==
- The men and machines that created Greyhound Bus Lines: Pictorial and memorabilia
- The Greyhound Story: Video presentation of the company history.
- The car they could not sell: The story of entrepreneurship from a 2-mile line Hibbing-Alice to the world's largest bus company.

== See also ==
- First Avenue, a nightclub that currently operates out of a former Greyhound Bus Terminal in Minneapolis, Minnesota.
