= List of railway stations in Canada =

The first railway in Canada, the Champlain and St. Lawrence Railroad, opened near Montreal in 1836. This list includes extant and demolished stations.

== Alberta ==
Name	Year	Railway	Architect (if unique) or pattern (if standard)	Notes
Banff	1910	Canadian Pacific		Heritage Register
Calgary CPR I	1893	Canadian Pacific	Edward Colonna	Dismantled 1911; stone reused at High River and Claresholm
Calgary CPR II	1912	Canadian Pacific		Demolished 1966
Edmonton CNoR	1905	Canadian Northern	Ralph Benjamin Pratt	Demolished 1953
Edmonton CNR	1928	Canadian National	John Schofield	Front section removed in 1966 to make way for CN Tower
Edmonton CPR	1913	Canadian Pacific		Demolished 1978
High River	1911	Canadian Pacific		Heritage Register. Built with stone from Calgary I.
Jasper	1926	Canadian National	John Schofield	Heritage Register
Lake Louise (Laggan) I	1890	Canadian Pacific		Moved to Heritage Park in Calgary in 1976
Lake Louise (Laggan) II	1910	Canadian Pacific		Now operates as a restaurant
Lethbridge	1905	Canadian Pacific		Heritage Register
Medicine Hat	1906	Canadian Pacific		Heritage Register
Strathcona	1908	Canadian Pacific		Heritage Register

== British Columbia ==
=== Island ===
Name	Year	Railway	Architect (if unique) or pattern (if standard)	Notes
Courtenay	1914	Esquimalt and Nanaimo		Heritage Register
Duncan	1912	Esquimalt and Nanaimo		Heritage Register
Nanaimo	1920	Esquimalt and Nanaimo		Heritage Register
Port Alberni	1911	Esquimalt and Nanaimo	R. A. Bainbridge	Heritage Register
Qualicum Beach	1914	Esquimalt and Nanaimo		Heritage Register
Victoria	1888	Esquimalt and Nanaimo		

=== Mainland ===
Name	Year	Railway	Architect (if unique) or pattern (if standard)	Notes
Field	1954	Canadian Pacific		Heritage Register
Fort Langley	1915	Canadian Northern		Heritage Register
Glacier	1916	Canadian Pacific		Heritage Register
Grand Forks	1900	Canadian Pacific		Heritage Register
Kamloops	1927	Canadian National		Heritage Register
Kelowna	1926	Canadian National		Heritage Register
Nelson	1900	Canadian Pacific		Heritage Register
New Westminster	1899	Canadian Pacific	Edward Maxwell	Heritage Register
North Vancouver I	1913	Pacific Great Eastern	Harold Cullerne	Heritage Register
North Vancouver II	1956	Pacific Great Eastern	Hale and Harrison	Demolished 2013
Penticton	1941	Kettle Valley		Heritage Register
Prince Rupert	1921	Canadian National		Heritage Register
Vancouver CNoPR	1919	Canadian Northern Pacific	Pratt and Ross	Heritage Register
Vancouver CPR I	1887	Canadian Pacific		Demolished 1898
Vancouver CPR II	1899	Canadian Pacific	Edward Colonna	Demolished 1914
Vancouver CPR III	1914	Canadian Pacific	Barott, Blackader and Webster	
Vancouver Union	1916	Great Northern	Fred Townley	Demolished 1965
Vernon	1911	Canadian Pacific		Heritage Register

== Manitoba ==
Name	Year	Railway	Architect (if unique) or pattern (if standard)	Notes
Brandon CNoR	1912	Canadian Northern		Attached to Prince Edward Hotel. Demolished 1980.
Brandon CPR I	1882	Canadian Pacific		Demolished 1894
Brandon CPR II	1894	Canadian Pacific		Demolished 1911
Brandon CPR III	1911	Canadian Pacific		Heritage Register
Brandon GNoR	1906	Great Northern		Demolished ca. 1967
Dauphin	1912	Canadian Northern	Pratt and Ross	Heritage Register
Gillam	1930	Canadian National		Heritage Register. Now Via.
Portage la Prairie CPR	1893	Canadian Pacific	Edward Colonna	Heritage Register
Portage la Prairie Union	1908	Grand Trunk Pacific/Midland		Heritage Register
Winnipeg CPR I	1882	Canadian Pacific		Demolished ?
Winnipeg CPR II	1905	Canadian Pacific	Edward and W. S. Maxwell	Heritage Register
Winnipeg Union	1911	Grand Trunk Pacific, Canadian Northern, National Transcontinental	Warren and Wetmore	Heritage Register

== New Brunswick ==
Name	Year	Railway	Architect (if unique) or pattern (if standard)	Notes
Edmundston CPR	1929	Canadian Pacific		Heritage Register
Edmundston CNR	1959	Canadian National		Heritage Register
Edmundston NTR	1914	National Transcontinental		Demolished 1959
Edmundston TSCR	1888	Temiscouata		Demolished 1950
Fredericton CPR	1923	Canadian Pacific		Heritage Register
Fredericton ICR	1911	Intercolonial		Demolished 1960s
McAdam	1900	Canadian Pacific	Edward Maxwell and W. S. Painter	Heritage Register
Sackville	1907	Intercolonial		Heritage Register
Shediac	1906		Albert Sincennes	Heritage Register
St. John Union I	1884			Demolished 1932
St. John Union II	1933		John Schofield	Demolished 1973
St. Stephen	1929			Heritage Register
Sussex	1913	Intercolonial		Heritage Register

== Newfoundland and Labrador ==
Name	Year	Railway	Architect (if unique) or pattern (if standard)	Notes
Bay Roberts		Newfoundland Railway		Heritage Register
Carbonear	1919	Newfoundland Railway	John Penney Powell	Heritage Register
Clarenville	1942	Newfoundland Railway		Heritage Register
Harbour Grace	1881	Newfoundland Railway		Heritage Register
St. John's		Newfoundland Railway		Operates as a museum
Western Bay	1914	Newfoundland Railway		Heritage Register

== Nova Scotia ==
Name	Year	Railway	Architect (if unique) or pattern (if standard)	Notes
Halifax Union	1928	Canadian National		Heritage Register. Attached to Hotel Nova Scotian.
Halifax North Street	1876	Intercolonial	Andrew Dewar and David Stirling	Demolished 1920s

== Ontario ==
Name	Year	Railway	Architect (if unique) or pattern (if standard)	Notes
Aberdeen		Toronto, Hamilton and Buffalo		
Achray		Canadian National		
Actinolite		Bay of Quinte		Defunct.
Acton GO	2013	GO Transit		Constructed for restoration of passenger service with the GO Kitchener line.
Acton GTR	1908	Grand Trunk		Demolished.
Acton GWR		Great Western		Likely demolished.
Agincourt GO	1982	GO Transit		Constructed for restoration of passenger service with the GO Stouffville line.
Agincourt O&Q		Ontario and Quebec		Defunct. Likely demolished.
Agincourt T&N	1871	Toronto and Nipissing		Original Agincourt station. Later acquired by GTR, then CN. Demolished.
Ailsa Craig				Defunct.
Albion		Canadian National		
Aldershot				Actively used by Via Rail and GO Transit
Alexandria	1917	Grand Trunk		Designated Heritage Railway Station. Heritage Register. Actively used by Via Rail.
Algonquin Park		Grand Trunk		
Allandale GTR	1905 (opened)	Grand Trunk	Spier and Rohns	Fourth Allandale station.
Allandale NRC		Northern		
Allandale OS&HURR	1853	Ontario, Simcoe and Huron Union		First Allandale station.
Allandale Waterfront GO	2012 (opened)	GO Transit		
Allanwater Bridge				Via Rail flag stop
Allenford		Grand Trunk		Likely demolished.
Alliston CPR	Canadian Pacific			Likely demolished.
Alliston GTR		Grand Trunk		Defunct.
Alma		Wellington, Grey and Bruce		Demolished.
Almonte		Canadian Pacific		
Alsfeldt		Grand Trunk		
Alton		Canadian Pacific		
Alvinston		New York Central		
Amherstburg		Michigan Central		
Angus		Grand Trunk		
Anson		Canadian National		
Appin		Canadian National		
Apple Hill		Canadian Pacific		
Ardbeg		Canadian National		
Ardendale		Canadian Pacific		
Arkell		Canadian Pacific		
Armstrong				Actively used by Via Rail
Arnprior		Canadian National		
Arthur		Canadian Pacific		
Athens		Canadian National		
Atherley Junction		Grand Trunk		
Atherley Narrows				
Atikokan CN	1923	Canadian National		Defunct.
Atikokan O&RR		Ontario and Rainy River		Demolished and replaced by CN station in 1923.
Atwood		Grand Trunk		
Auburn		Canadian Pacific		
Auden				Actively in use by Via Rail
Aultsville		Canadian National		Original location has been flooded but the station was moved to Upper Canada Village and survives today.
Aurora	1900	Grand Trunk		Heritage Register.
Aurora T&Y		Toronto and York Radial		
Avening		Northern and Northwestern		
Avonmore		Canadian Pacific		
Aylmer		Grand Trunk		
Ayr		Canadian Pacific		
Ayton		Grand Trunk		
Azilda				Actively used by Via Rail
Baden		Grand Trunk		Defunct. Likely demolished.
Bala CNoR		Canadian Northern		Defunct.
Bala CPR		Canadian Pacific		Defunct.
Bancroft	1883–84 (circa)	Central Ontario		Later owned by CN. Station became defunct but was renovated and later used by the local Chamber of Commerce.
Barwick		Ontario and Rainy River		Defunct. Station building has been moved from its original location.
Batchewana		Algoma Central		Defunct.
Beachville		Grand Trunk		Defunct.
Beamsville		Grand Trunk		Defunct.
Bear Lake		Canadian National		Defunct.
Beaverton		Grand Trunk		Came under CN ownership. Defunct.
Bedell		Canadian Pacific		Defunct. Bedell was a small railway community near Kemptville which was mainly composed of CPR workers and their families. It was originally Kemptville Junction, then Kempton, and finally Bedell sometime after WWI.
Beeton		Grand Trunk		Defunct.
Bell Ewart		Northern Railway of Canada		Defunct.
Belle River	1872 (before/circa)	Great Western		Disused; likely demolished
Belleville CNoR	1911	Canadian Northern		Came under CP ownership. In use until 1966. Demolished in 1976.
Belleville GTR	1856	Grand Trunk	GTR Type B	National Historic Site. Designated Heritage Railway Station. Heritage Register.
Belleville Via	2012	Via Rail		Actively used by Via Rail.
Benny				Actively used by Via Rail
Bethany		Grand Trunk		Defunct. Originally Port Hope, Lindsay and Beaverton Railway.
Biscotasing				Actively used by Via Rail
Blair GTR	1872–73?	Grand Trunk		Defunct and likely demolished. The Doon branch through Blair was abandoned in the 1950s and tracks were removed sometime after.
Bloomfield		Central Ontario		
Blythe CN		Canadian National		Now used as a bed and breakfast.
Blythe CPR		Canadian Pacific		Station has been restored and relocated.
Bobcaygeon		Canadian Pacific		Defunct.
Bolger		Canadian National		Defunct.
Bolkow				Actively used by Via Rail
Bolton		Canadian Pacific		Disused. Service restoration under a GO Transit Bolton line has been proposed.
Bonarlaw		Canadian National		Defunct. The community was originally known as Central Ontario Junction.
Bracebridge				Disused
Brampton	1907	Grand Trunk		Designated Heritage Railway Station. Heritage Register. Actively used by Via Rail and GO Transit.
Brantford GTR	1905	Grand Trunk	Spier and Rohns	Designated Heritage Railway Station. Heritage Register. Actively used by Via Rail.
Brantford Union Station	1916–17	Lake Erie and Northern; Brantford and Hamilton	Theodore Videto	Joint station used by both railways designed in the New England Colonial style. B&H service ended in 1931, though LE&N service continued until 1955. The station stood vacant for 3 years before being demolished in 1958. Due to its location, the station site was never redeveloped, and the ruins of the station's foundations are still visible.
Brussels		Grand Trunk		Defunct.
Buda		Canadian Pacific		Defunct.
Burford		Grand Trunk		Defunct.
Burgessville		Grand Trunk		Defunct.
Burk's Falls		Grand Trunk		Defunct.
Burnt River		Grand Trunk		Defunct.
Byng Inlet		Canadian Pacific		Defunct.
Caledon		Canadian Pacific		Defunct. The station is now a private home.
Caledonia		Grand Trunk		Defunct.
Callander		Grand Trunk		Defunct.
Camden East		Canadian Northern		Defunct.
Camlachie		Grand Trunk		Defunct.
Campbellcroft		Canadian National		Defunct.
Campbellford		Grand Trunk		Defunct.
Campbellville		Canadian Pacific		Defunct.
Camp Borden CNR		Canadian National		Temporary station which was open during the Second World War.
Camp Borden CPR		Canadian Pacific		Defunct.
Canfield		Grand Trunk		Defunct.
Canfield Junction		Grand Trunk		Defunct. Later owned by CN.
Canyon (ACR)		Algoma Central		Disused ACR station in Agawa Canyon.
Canyon				Actively used by Via Rail. Not to be confused with Agawa Canyon station in Northeastern Ontario.
Capreol	1915	Canadian Northern		Actively used by Via Rail
Caradoc		Canadian Pacific		
Caramat				Actively used by Via Rail
Cardinal		Grand Trunk		Defunct.
Cargill		Grand Trunk		Defunct. Later came under CN ownership. Now used as a private home.
Carleton Junction		Canadian Pacific		
Carleton Place	1921–22	Canadian Pacific		Designated Heritage Railway Station. Heritage Register. Disused.
Cartier	1910	Canadian Pacific		Designated Heritage Railway Station. Heritage Register. Actively used by Via Rail.
Casselman	1938–39	Canadian National		Designated Heritage Railway Station. Heritage Register. Actively used by Via Rail.
Cataract		Canadian Pacific		
Cavan		Canadian Pacific		
Cayuga		Great Western		Disused, likely demolished
Chalk River		Canadian Pacific		Defunct.
Charing Cross		Michigan Central		Defunct.
Chapleau				Actively used by Via Rail
Chatham	1879	Great Western		Designated Heritage Railway Station. Heritage Register. Actively used by Via Rail.
Chelmsford				Actively used by Via Rail
Chesley		Grand Trunk		Defunct.
Chesterville		Canadian Pacific		Defunct.
Clarabelle		Algoma Eastern		Sat at the junction of seven rail lines near Sudbury, and once had the highest tonnage of freight pass through of any station in Canada.
Claremont		Canadian Pacific		Defunct but the Havelock Subdivision is still active and restored passenger service has been proposed.
Clarendon		Canadian Pacific		Defunct. The station building is now a private home.
Clarkson GWR	1853	Great Western		Also known as Clarkson's or Clarkson's Corner
Clarkson GO	1967 (circa)	GO Transit		Actively used by GO Transit
Clifford		Grand Trunk		Defunct.
Clifton	1879 (or earlier)	Great Western		Likely demolished
Clinton		Canadian National		
Clute				Actively used by Ontario Northland Railway
Cobalt	1910	Temiskaming and Northern Ontario	Edwardian Classical (John M. Lyle)	Heritage Register. Used as a museum and offices.
Coboconk T&N	1872	Toronto and Nipissing		Destroyed by fire around 1908. Replaced by the second station.
Coboconk GTR		Grand Trunk		Built by the Grand Trunk Railway sometime after 1908. Later came under CN ownership. Became defunct and was relocated to a park for restoration.
Cobourg	1910–1911	Grand Trunk	Romanesque Revival (J.M. Bearbrook, adapted by L.M. Watts)	Designated Heritage Railway Station. Heritage Register. Actively used by Via Rail.
Cochrane				Actively used by Ontario Northland Railway
Coe Hill	1884 (circa)	Central Ontario		Built by the Central Ontario Railway and later came under Canadian Northern and Canadian National ownership. The section of line was abandoned in 1984 and the station became defunct. The station building was relocated to the community park and was restored.
Colborne GTR		Grand Trunk		Grand Trunk station. Later came under CN ownership. Defunct.
Colborne CPR		Canadian Pacific		Defunct.
Coldwater CPR		Canadian Pacific		Defunct.
Coldwater GTR		Grand Trunk		Defunct. Seems to have been replaced by a later CN station.
Collingwood NRC		Northern Railway of Canada		Original Collingwood station, which was destroyed by a fire in 1873.
Collingwood GTR		Grand Trunk		Second station, constructed after the loss of the first. Suffered a fire in 1932 which destroyed much of the building, but it was repaired and continued to be used until the end of passenger service in 1960. Later used as a town museum until 1997, when it was demolished due to structural problems. A replica station was constructed in 1998 as a new town museum.
Collins				Actively used by Via Rail
Comber	1872–73	Canada Southern		Designated Heritage Railway Station. Heritage Register. Came under CN ownership. Defunct.
Coniston CN	1912	Canadian Northern		Created to operate the interlock between CNoR and CPR tracks. The first station building consisted of only a boxcar and was operated by a single station agent. This was replaced by a permanent station building two years later. The manual interlock was replaced by an automatic electrical system in 1934. The station closed in 1967 and was rented out to the Chevron Company until 1977, when this operation also closed. The building was demolished in 1978.
Coniston CPR	1912	Canadian Pacific		For the CPR junction station near Coniston, see Romford station. Small railway station in Coniston proper operated by a single station agent. The station was notably used to ship fresh blueberries to Toronto in summers. It was shut down in 1970 and demolished sometime after.
Cookstown		Canadian National		Defunct.
Cooksville CP	1912	Canadian Pacific		Stood until 1975
Cooksville CVR I	1878	Credit Valley		Destroyed by fire in 1883
Cooksville CVR II	1883 (circa)	Credit Valley/Canadian Pacific		Likely demolished
Cooksville GO I	1981 (circa)	GO Transit		Demolished/rebuilt extensively
Cooksville GO II	2020 (in progress)	GO Transit		Extensive rebuild of 1980s commuter station
Copelands Landing				Actively used by Via Rail
Copetown		Grand Trunk		Defunct.
Copper Cliff		Canadian Pacific		Likely demolished
Coral Rapids				Actively used by Ontario Northland Railway
Corbetton		Canadian Pacific		Defunct.
Corinth		Grand Trunk		Defunct.
Courtright		Michigan Central		Defunct.
Craigleith		Grand Trunk		Defunct. The station building has been converted into a local museum.
Craigvale NRC		Northern Railway of Canada		First station in Craigvale. Burned down in 1896.
Craigvale GTR	1896 (circa)	Grand Trunk		Second station in Craigvale. The station was demolished in 1964.
Creemore		Grand Trunk		Defunct.
Curries		Grand Trunk		Defunct.
Dalton				Actively used by Via Rail
Devon				Actively used by Via Rail
Doon		Grand Trunk		Defunct. Rails removed. Station is likely demolished. Possibly preceded by earlier Great Western station.
Elmira		Guelph and Goderich / CPR		Defunct and likely demolished.
Elsas		Canadian National		Actively used by Via Rail
Englehart I				Replaced by modern station
Englehart II				Passenger service discontinued, freight operations only
Ernestown	1855	Grand Trunk	GTR Type C, Italianate style	Designated Heritage Railway Station. Heritage Register. Abandoned.
Esher				Actively used by Via Rail
Espanola	1911	Algoma Eastern		Demolished in 1970s-90s.
Essex	1887	Michigan Central		
Fallowfield	2002 (rail opening)	Via Rail		Suburban Ottawa station in Barrhaven.
Farlane				Actively used by Via Rail
Felix				Actively used by Via Rail
Ferland				Actively in use by Via Rail
Flindt Landing				Actively used by Via Rail
Foleyet				Actively used by Via Rail
Fort Frances	1913	Canadian Northern		Designated Heritage Railway Station. Heritage Register. Came under CN ownership. Disused.
Franz				Actively used by Via Rail; former ACR stop.
Fraserdale				Actively used by Ontario Northland Railway
Galt CPR	1898–1900	Canadian Pacific	Edward Maxwell	Designated Heritage Railway Station. Heritage Register. Disused.
Georgetown	1858	Grand Trunk	Francis Thompson	Designated Heritage Railway Station. Heritage Register. Actively used by Via Rail and GO Transit.
Girdwood				Actively used by Via Rail
Glencoe GWR I	1854	Great Western		
Glencoe GWR II	1856	Great Western		
Glencoe GTR I	1900	Grand Trunk		
Glencoe GTR II	1904	Grand Trunk		
Gravenhurst				Used as a boarding point for Ontario Northland motor coach service after rail service discontinuation
Gogama				Actively used by Via Rail
Grimsby GWR I	1853	Great Western		
Grimsby GWR II		Great Western		Destroyed by fire in 1900
Grimsby GTR	1902 (circa)	Grand Trunk		Destroyed by electrical fire in 1994
Grimsby	1990s	Via Rail		Actively used by Via Rail
Grimsby Park/Grimsby Beach				Likely demolished
Guelph Central	1911	Grand Trunk		Designated Heritage Railway Station. Heritage Register. Actively used by Via Rail and GO Transit.
Guildwood	1967	Canadian National		Actively used by Via Rail and GO Transit.
Hamilton GTR	1856	Grand Trunk		Demolished 1931
Hamilton TH&BR I	1895	Toronto, Hamilton and Buffalo	William Stewart and Son	Demolished 1933
Hamilton TH&BR II	1931–1933	Toronto, Hamilton and Buffalo	Streamline Moderne (Fellheimer and Wagner)	Designated Heritage Railway Station. Heritage Register. Actively used by GO Transit.
Havelock	1914–1929	Canadian Pacific		Designated Heritage Railway Station. Heritage Register. Disused.
Hawk Junction		Algoma Central		Disused ACR station
Hespeler GTR		Grand Trunk		Defunct. The Hespeler Heritage Railway Station Association attempted to restore the station in the 1990s before it was destroyed by arson.
Hespeler GRR		Grand River		Defunct. Terminal station of the Grand River Railway Hespeler branch.
Hillsport				Actively used by Via Rail
Hornepayne	1913	Canadian Northern		Designated Heritage Railway Station. Heritage Register. Known as Fitzbach station until 1920. Building is abandoned but station is actively used by Via Rail.
Huntsville N&PJ	1885	Northern and Pacific Junction		Likely demolished
Huntsville CN	1924	Canadian National		Designated Heritage Railway Station. Heritage Register. Disused.
Ingersoll	1886	Great Western/Grand Trunk		Original station building is disused; station is still actively used by Via Rail
Hamilton CNR	1931	Canadian National	John Schofield	
Kenora (Rat Portage)	1899	Canadian Pacific	Picturesque	Designated Heritage Railway Station. Heritage Register. Disused.
Kinogama				Actively used by Via Rail
Kingsville	1889	Lake Erie, Essex, and Detroit River	Albert Kahn	Now used as a restaurant
Kitchener (Berlin)	1897	Grand Trunk		Actively used by Via Rail, GO Transit, and GEXR
Kitchener Junction		Grand River/Kitchener and Waterloo Street		Passenger interchange station between the Grand River Railway and the Kitchener and Waterloo Street Railway, constructed after the relocation of Grand River Railway tracks from the western end of King Street in downtown Kitchener. Southern terminus and depot of the street railway. Later evolved into a trolleybus terminal and depot. After the terminal closed, the building was reused as the Rockway Centre.
Kitchener Queen Street		Grand River		Demolished in 1970s
Kormak				Actively used by Via Rail
Laforest				Actively used by Via Rail
Larchwood				Actively used by Via Rail
Levack				Actively used by Via Rail
Little Current	1912 (circa)	Algoma Eastern		Demolished.
Lochalsh				Actively used by Via Rail
London CNR I	1935	Canadian National	John Schofield	Demolished ca. 1960
London CNR II	1963	Canadian National		Now part of Via station
London CPR	1893	Canadian Pacific		Now a restaurant
London GWR	1853	Great Western		Demolished 1935
London MCR	1887	Michigan Central	Samuel Frank Peters	Demolished 1937
Long Branch				Defunct
Longlac				Actively used by Via Rail
Malachi				Actively used by Via Rail
Malton GO I	1974	GO Transit		Constructed for the start of GO service to Malton
Malton GO II	2014	GO Transit		Extensive rebuild of existing GO station
Malton GTR I	1856	Grand Trunk		Replaced by 1912 station
Malton GTR II	1912	Grand Trunk		Demolished by CN Rail in 1973
Matheson I	1908 (circa)	Temiskaming and Northern Ontario		Destroyed in Matheson Fire
Matheson II	1916 (circa)	Temiskaming and Northern Ontario		Disused
McKee's Camp				Actively used by Via Rail
McKerrow		Canadian Pacific		Demolished sometime after 1975
Meadowvale CVR	1878 (circa)	Credit Valley		Downgraded to flag stop in 1960. Demolished in summer 1976 after CPR service was discontinued in 1962.
Meadowvale GO	1981 (circa)	GO Transit		Actively used by GO Transit
Merritton				Likely demolished
Metagama				Actively used by Via Rail
Midland CNR	1944	Canadian National	John Schofield	Demolished?
Mimico I	1888 (or earlier)	Grand Trunk		
Mimico II	1915	Grand Trunk		Relocated for preservation to Coronation Park
Minaki	1910	National Transcontinental		Actively used by Via Rail
Missanabie				Actively used by Via Rail
Moose River				Actively used by Ontario Northland Railway
Moosonee	1960s			Actively used by Ontario Northland Railway
Mount Pleasant LE&N	1916	Lake Erie and Northern	CPR	Awaiting restoration
Mud River				Actively used by Via Rail
Musk				Actively used by Via Rail
Nairn AER		Algoma Eastern		Likely demolished shortly after AER was acquired by CPR.
Nairn CPR		Canadian Pacific		Demolished.
Nakina				Actively in use by Via Rail
Napanee	1856	Grand Trunk		Actively used by Via Rail.
Nemegos				Actively used by Via Rail
New Hamburg		Grand Trunk		Defunct and likely demolished.
New Liskeard	1906			Disused
Nicholson				Actively used by Via Rail
North Bay				Used for motor coach services only
North Lake CNoR	1907 (circa)	Canadian Northern		Replaced earlier PAD&W station. Station and track section were abandoned by CN in 1923. Replica of station was constructed in 1977, but is now demolished. Station was intentionally burned by the Ontario Ministry of Natural Resources in the late 1970s response to conservation efforts.
North Lake PAD&W	1893 (circa)	Port Arthur, Duluth and Western		A log freight shed. Replaced by later CNoR station. Likely demolished.
O'Brien				Actively used by Via Rail
O'Donnell		Algoma Eastern		Demolished.
Oakville GWR	1856	Great Western		Demolished
Oakville				Actively used by Via Rail and GO Transit
Oba				Former transfer station with the Algoma Central Railway; actively used by Via Rail
Oshawa CN	1960s	Canadian National		Demolished and replaced with GO station.
Oshawa GTR	1856?	Grand Trunk		Likely demolished; replaced with CN station.
Oshawa GO		GO Transit		Actively used by Via Rail and GO Transit.
Ottawa	1966		John B. Parkin Associates	
Ottawa Union	1912		Ross and MacFarlane	Now occupied by the Senate of Canada
Ottermere				Actively used by Via Rail
Parry Sound CNR				Actively used by Via Rail for eastbound trains only
Parry Sound CPR				Actively used by Via Rail for westbound trains only
Petersburg		Grand Trunk		Station has been moved from its original location to the Doon Pioneer Village and restored.
Pogamasing				Actively used by Via Rail
Port Credit CN		Canadian National		Replaced earlier GWR station which was destroyed by fire
Port Credit GO	1967	GO Transit		Replaced earlier CN station, actively used by GO Transit
Port Credit GWR	1855	Great Western		Destroyed by fire late 1910s-early 1920s
Port Hope	1856	Grand Trunk		Designated Heritage Railway Station. Heritage Register. Actively used by Via Rail.
Prescott	1855	Grand Trunk		Designated Heritage Railway Station. Heritage Register. No longer has regular passenger service.
Preston Junction		Preston and Berlin Street/Electric; Galt, Preston and Hespeler		Marked a junction point between the two railways, which were later merged into the Grand River Railway. Used as a terminal point for Canadian Pacific Transport Company coach service from 1925 until the end of CP coach service in the area. After the end of passenger services it was used as a freight crew office before being demolished in the mid-1970s.
Ramsey				Actively used by Via Rail
Red Lake Road				Actively used by Via Rail
Redditt				Actively used by Via Rail
Rice Lake				Actively used by Via Rail
Richan				Actively used by Via Rail
Roberts				Actively used by Via Rail
Romford	1905	Canadian Pacific		The original station in the Coniston area. Romford was a CPR control point operated by a three-man crew (one agent and two operators) and controlled the three tracks which passed through the area. The station was used to manage freight interchange with the Inco Railway, including ore trains from Levack. The station closed in August 1979.
Ruel				Actively in use by Via Rail
Sarnia Tunnel	1891	Grand Trunk	Joseph Hobson	
Savant Lake	1913			Actively used by Via Rail
Searchmont		Algoma Central		Designated Heritage Railway Station. Disused.
Sheahan				Actively used by Via Rail
Silver Mountain CNoR	1907 (circa)	Canadian Northern	Plan 100-3 (Ralph Benjamin Pratt)	Rail service ended in 1938. Afterward, station was used as a private residence, bar, and restaurant successively. Today the office of the Silver Mountain and Area Historical Society.
Silver Mountain PAD&W		Port Arthur, Duluth and Western		Replaced by newer CNoR station. Likely demolished.
Sioux Lookout	1911	Grand Trunk Pacific		Built by GTPR, also used by the NTR. Actively used by Via Rail.
South Parkdale				Replaced with Sunnyside station by GTR in 1912
South River	1884	Northern and Pacific Junction		Disused
St. Catharines GWR	1853	Great Western		Demolished?
St. Catharines GTR	1898	Grand Trunk		Demolished?
St. Catharines GTR II	1917	Grand Trunk		Actively used by Via Rail and GO Transit
St. Jacobs		Grand Trunk		Likely demolished.
St. Marys	1907	Grand Trunk		
St. Marys Junction	1858	Grand Trunk		
St. Thomas CASO	1873	Canada Southern	Edgar Berryman	
Stoney Point	1911 (circa)	Grand Trunk		Disused; possibly demolished
Stralak				Actively used by Via Rail
Stratford GTR I	1856	Grand Trunk		
Stratford GTR II	1913	Grand Trunk		Actively used by Via Rail
Strathroy				Via Rail flag stop
Stratton		Ontario and Rainy River		Defunct. Station has been moved from original location.
Sudbury CNR		Canadian National		Demolished along with Borgia neighbourhood in urban renewal effort
Sudbury CPR	1907	Canadian Pacific		Designated Heritage Railway Station. Heritage Register. Actively used by Via Rail.
Sudbury Junction		Via Rail		Actively used by Via Rail
Sultan				Actively used by Via Rail
Summerville	1878 (circa)	Credit Valley		Relocated multiple times by preservationists
Sunnyside	1912	Grand Trunk		Replaced South Parkdale and Swansea stations
Swansea				Replaced by Sunnyside station in 1912
Swastika	1908	Temiskaming and Northern Ontario		Mostly abandoned, remainder used for motor coach services
Temagami I	1907	Temiskaming and Northern Ontario		Destroyed by fire c. 1909
Temagami II	1909 (circa)	Temiskaming and Northern Ontario		Disused; local heritage structure
Thessalon	1910 (circa)	Canadian Pacific		Once a CP divisional point. Station was demolished sometime around 1971.
Toronto North	1916	Canadian Pacific	Darling and Pearson	
Toronto Union I	1858	(union)		Demolished 1871
Toronto Union II	1873	(union)	Thomas Seaton Scott	Demolished 1927
Toronto Union III	1927	(union)	Ross and Macdonald, John M. Lyle	
Trenton Junction				Actively used by Via Rail.
Uxbridge GTR	1904	Grand Trunk		No longer has regular passenger service, but is a stop on the York–Durham Heritage Railway.
Uxbridge T&NR	1871 (circa)	Toronto and Nipissing		Likely demolished; replaced by GTR station.
Walkerville				Defunct; possibly demolished
Washago CNoR	1906	Canadian Northern		Relocated to current station site after loss of GTR station
Washago CNR		Grand Trunk		Destroyed by fire around 1913
Washago Via		Via Rail		Actively used by Via Rail
Wasing		Canadian National		Station on the CN Alderdale Subdivision. Disappeared from passenger schedules by the 1960s–70s. Defunct.
Waterdown	1912	Canadian Pacific		
Waterloo	1910	Grand Trunk		Heritage Register. Now used by a menswear retailer.
Wawa		Algoma Central		Line has been abandoned and the station has likely been demolished.
Webbwood		Canadian Pacific		Divisional point for the CP Webbwood Subdivision. Likely demolished.
Welland GTR	1914 (circa)	Grand Trunk		Likely demolished
Westree				Actively used by Via Rail
Whitby Junction	1903	Grand Trunk		
White River	1886	Canadian Pacific		Actively used by Via Rail
Whitefish	1889 (or earlier)	Canadian Pacific		Likely demolished
Windsor CN	1960s (early)	Canadian National		Demolished?
Windsor GTR	1884	Grand Trunk		Closed 1965, demolished?
Windsor MCR	1911	Michigan Central/Canada Southern		Destroyed by arson in 1996
Windsor Via	2012	Via Rail		Actively used by Via Rail
Woman River				Actively used by Via Rail
Woodstock	1885	Grand Trunk		Actively used by Via Rail
Wyoming				Actively used by Via Rail

== Prince Edward Island ==
Name	Year	Railway	Architect (if unique) or pattern (if standard)	Notes
Alberton	1904	Prince Edward Island Railway	Charles Benjamin Chappell	Heritage Register
Charlottetown	1905	Prince Edward Island Railway		Heritage Register
Elmira	1912	Prince Edward Island Railway		Heritage Register
Emerald	1923	Prince Edward Island Railway		Heritage Register
Georgetown	1902	Prince Edward Island Railway	Charles Benjamin Chappell	
Hunter River		Prince Edward Island Railway		
Kensington	1904	Prince Edward Island Railway	Charles Benjamin Chappell	Heritage Register
Montague	1905	Prince Edward Island Railway		Heritage Register
Murray River		Prince Edward Island Railway		
O'Leary	1913	Prince Edward Island Railway		Heritage Register
Summerside		Prince Edward Island Railway		

== Quebec ==
Name	Year	Railway	Architect (if unique) or pattern (if standard)	Notes
Acton Vale	1900	Grand Trunk		
Coaticook	1883	Grand Trunk		
Chicoutimi		Canadian National		Train service ended 1988, still extant
Farnham	1951	Canadian Pacific		
Lacolle	1930	Canadian Pacific	Charles Reginald Tetley	
Montebello				
Montreal Bonaventure	1887	Montreal and Lachine Railway	Thomas Seaton Scott	Demolished 1952
Montreal Centrale	1943	Canadian National	John Schofield, John Campbell Merrett	
Montreal Dalhousie	1884	Canadian Pacific	Thomas C. Sorby	
Montreal Jean-Talon	1931	Canadian Pacific	Colin Drewitt	
Montréal-Ouest	1889	Canadian Pacific		
Montreal Place Viger	1898	Canadian Pacific	Bruce Price	
Montreal Windsor	1887	Canadian Pacific	Bruce Price	
La Pocatière		Grand Trunk		
Quebec City (Gare du Palais)	1915	Canadian Pacific	H. E. Prindel	designated a Heritage Railway Station in 1992.
Richmond	1912	Grand Trunk		
Saint-Jean-d'Iberville	1890	Grand Trunk		
Shawinigan	1929	Canadian National		
Trois-Rivières	1924			
Westmount	1907	Canadian Pacific	W.S. Painter	

== Saskatchewan ==
Name	Year	Railway	Architect (if unique) or pattern (if standard)	Notes
Biggar	1908	Grand Trunk Pacific		Demolished 2018
Melville	1908	Grand Trunk Pacific		Heritage Register
Moose Jaw CNR	1919	Canadian National	John Schofield	Heritage Register. Now operates as a day spa
Moose Jaw CPR I	1898	Canadian Pacific	Edward Maxwell	Demolished 1928
Moose Jaw CPR II	1920	Canadian Pacific	Hugh G. Jones	Heritage Register Perdue Saskatchewan 1907 Relocated to Grandora SK in late 1960s - present
Regina Union	1912	Canadian Pacific/Canadian Northern	John Wilson Orrock	Heritage Register. Now Casino Regina.
Saskatoon CPR I	1880	Canadian Pacific		Demolished 1908
Saskatoon CPR II	1908	Canadian Pacific	J. Carmichael	Heritage Register
Saskatoon CNR I	1939	Canadian National	John Scholfield	Demolished 1964
Saskatoon CNR II	1964	Canadian National	H.C. Greensides, Bennett and White	Heritage Register
Saskatoon CNoR	1910	Canadian Northern		Demolished 1939
Swift Current	1907	Canadian Pacific		Heritage Register

== See also ==
- List of designated heritage railway stations of Canada
- List of IATA-indexed railway stations
- Station code

== Bibliography ==
- Bohi, Charles W. and Leslie S. Kozma. Canadian Pacific's Western Depots. David City, Neb.: South Platte Press, 1993.
- Bohi, Charles W. Canadian National's Western Depots: The Country Stations in Western Canada. Don Mills, Ont.: Fitzhenry and Whiteside, 1977.
- Martin, J. Edward. The Railway Stations of Western Canada: An Architectural History. White Rock, B.C.: Studio E, 1980.
