= List of designated heritage railway stations of Canada =

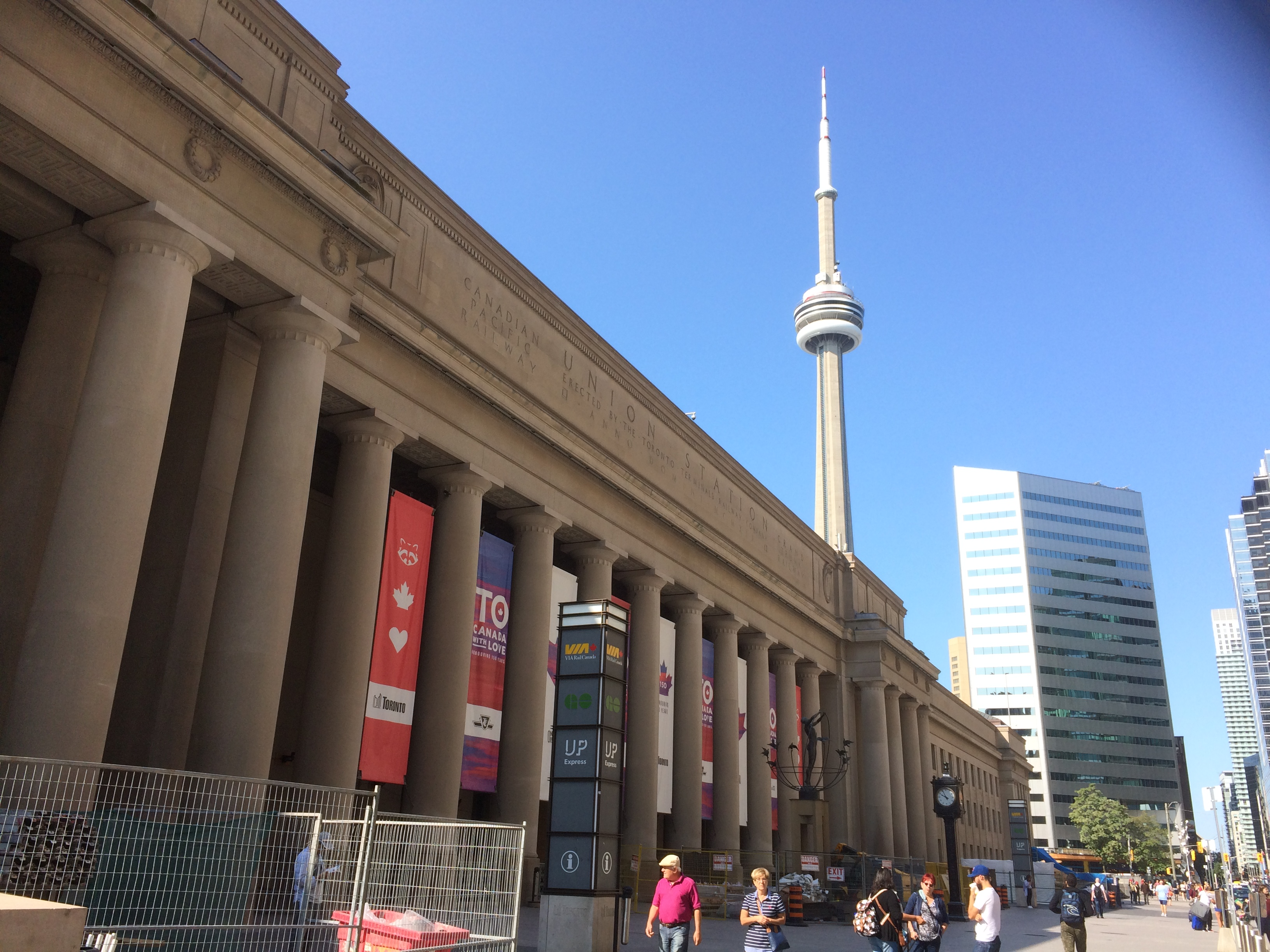
During the 1960s, a push to demolish Toronto Union Station led to a public backlash and designation of the station as a National Historic Site.

This is a list of railway stations in Canada which have been designated under the Heritage Railway Stations Protection Act. The names given for stations are taken from the Directory of Designated Heritage Railway Stations maintained by the Historic Sites and Monuments Board of Canada, and may not be the same as those used by particular transport agencies.

== List of stations ==
=== Alberta ===
Station	Active	Railway(s)	Community	Year of construction	CRHP I.D.
Banff	Tourist Trains	CPR	Banff	1910	4529
Empress	No	CPR	Empress	1914	3191
Hanna	No	CNoR	Hanna	1913	6708
Jasper	Yes	CN	Jasper	1925	6761
Lake Louise	Tourist Trains	CPR	Lake Louise	1910	4516
Medicine Hat	No	CPR	Medicine Hat	1906	9321

=== British Columbia ===
Station	Active	Railway(s)	Community	Year of construction	CRHP I.D.
Glacier	No	CPR	Glacier National Park (Canada)	1916	4572
Courtenay	No	CPR	Courtenay	1914	4587
Duncan	No	E&N	Duncan	1912	15463
Field	No	CPR	Field	1953–54	1927
Kamloops	Tourist Trains	CN	Kamloops	1926–27	6760
McBride	Yes	GTPR	McBride	1919	6631
Nanaimo	No	E&N	Nanaimo	1920	1418
Nelson	No	CPR	Nelson	1920	4562
Pacific Central Station	Yes	CNoR	Vancouver	1917	4527
Prince Rupert	Yes	CN	Prince Rupert	1921–22	6759
Salmo	No	N&FS	Salmo	1913	9330
Smithers	Yes	GTPR	Smithers	1919	6493

=== Manitoba ===
Station	Active	Railway(s)	Community	Year of construction	CRHP I.D.
Churchill	Yes	CN	Churchill	1929	9525
Cranberry Portage	Yes	CN	Cranberry Portage	1929	4548
Dauphin	Yes	CNoR	Dauphin	1912	6496
Gillam	Yes	CN	Gillam	1930	4549
McCreary	Yes	CNoR	McCreary	1912	6630
Miami	No	CNoR	McCreary	1912	11117

=== New Brunswick ===
Station	Active	Railway(s)	Community	Year of construction	CRHP I.D.
McAdam	No	CPR	McAdam	1900–01	6476
Sackville	Yes	ICR	Sackville	1908–09	4592

=== Ontario ===
Station	Active	Railway(s)	Community (within city if different)	Year of construction	CRHP I.D.
Alexandria	Yes	GTR	Alexandria	1916–17	4620
Allandale	Yes	GTR	Allandale (Barrie)	1890	8884
Aurora	Yes	GTR	Aurora	1853, 1900	6500
Belleville	Yes	GTR	Belleville	1855–56	4552
Brampton	Yes	GTR	Brampton	1907	4567
Brantford	Yes	GTR	Brantford	1905	4515
Cartier	Yes	CPR	Cartier	1910, 1948	4608
Casselman	Yes	CN	Casselman	1938–39	4621
Chatham	Yes	GWR	Chatham	1879	4584
Cobourg	Yes	GTR	Cobourg	1911	4617
Carleton Place	No		Carleton Place		
Comber	No		Comber		
Ernestown	No	GTR	Ernestown	1855-1856	4551
Fort Frances	No		Fort Frances		
Galt	No		Galt (Cambridge)		
Georgetown	Yes		Georgetown		
Guelph	Yes		Guelph		
Hamilton CNR	No		Hamilton		
Toronto, Hamilton & Buffalo Railway Station, Former	Yes	TH&B	Hamilton	1933	6531
Havelock	No	CPR	Havelock	1914-1929	6701
Hornepayne	Yes		Hornepayne		
Huntsville	No		Huntsville		
Kenora	No		Kenora		
Kingston			Kingston		
Kitchener	Yes		Kitchener		
Leamington			Leamington		
Maple	Yes	GTR	Maple (Vaughan)	1903	6765
Markham	Yes	T&N	Markham	1871	6762
Nakina			Nakina		
Newmarket			Newmarket		
Niagara Falls	Yes	GWR/GTR	Niagara Falls	1879	4624
North Bay CNR			North Bay		
North Bay CPR			North Bay		
Orillia CNR			Orillia		
Ottawa station	Yes	Via Rail	Ottawa	1966	15816
Owen Sound CPR	No	CPR	Owen Sound	1946-1947	4589
Parry Sound CPR			Parry Sound, Ontario		
Port Hope	Yes	GTR	Port Hope	1856	4553
Prescott			Prescott, Ontario		
Sarnia			Sarnia		
Schreiber			Schreiber, Ontario		
Searchmont			Searchmont, Ontario		
Sioux Lookout			Sioux Lookout		
St. Catharines			St. Catharines		
St. Marys Junction			St. Marys, Ontario		
St. Thomas			St. Thomas, Ontario		
Stratford	Yes	GTR	Stratford, Ontario	1913	15767
Sudbury	Yes	CPR	Sudbury	1907	4596
Thunder Bay			Thunder Bay		
Toronto Union	Yes	Toronto Terminals Railway	Toronto	1927	6492
Unionville	No	T&N	Unionvile (Markham)	1871	6808
White River	Yes	CPR	White River, Ontario	1926-7, 1930, 1957	4613
Woodstock	Yes	Great Western Railway	Woodstock, Ontario	1885	4610

=== Quebec ===
Station	Active	Railway(s)	Community	Year of construction	CRHP I.D.
Amqui	Yes	ICR	Amqui	1904	4593
Farnham	No	CPR	Farnham	1950	7101
Joliette	Yes	GNR	Joliette	1901	4626

=== Saskatchewan ===
Station	Active	Railway(s)	Community	Year of construction	CRHP I.D.
Biggar	Yes	GTPR	Biggar	1909	4579
Broadview	No	CPR	Broadview	1913	4563
Humboldt	No	CNoR	Humboldt	1905	4560
Melville	Yes	GTPR	Melville	1908	4561
North Battleford	No	CN	North Battleford	1956	4582
Saskatoon	No	CPR	Saskatoon	1907–08	6773
VIA Rail (Union) Station	Yes	CN	Saskatoon	1964	4576
Swift Current	No	CPR	Swift Current	1907	4525
Wynyard	No	CPR	Wynyard	1909	4526

=== Yukon ===
Station	Active	Railway(s)	Community	Year of construction	CRHP I.D.
Carcross	Heritage	WP&Y	Carcross	1910	6723

== See also ==
- List of railway stations in Canada
- History of rail transport in Canada
