= Empress station =

Former railway station in Empress, Canada

Empress
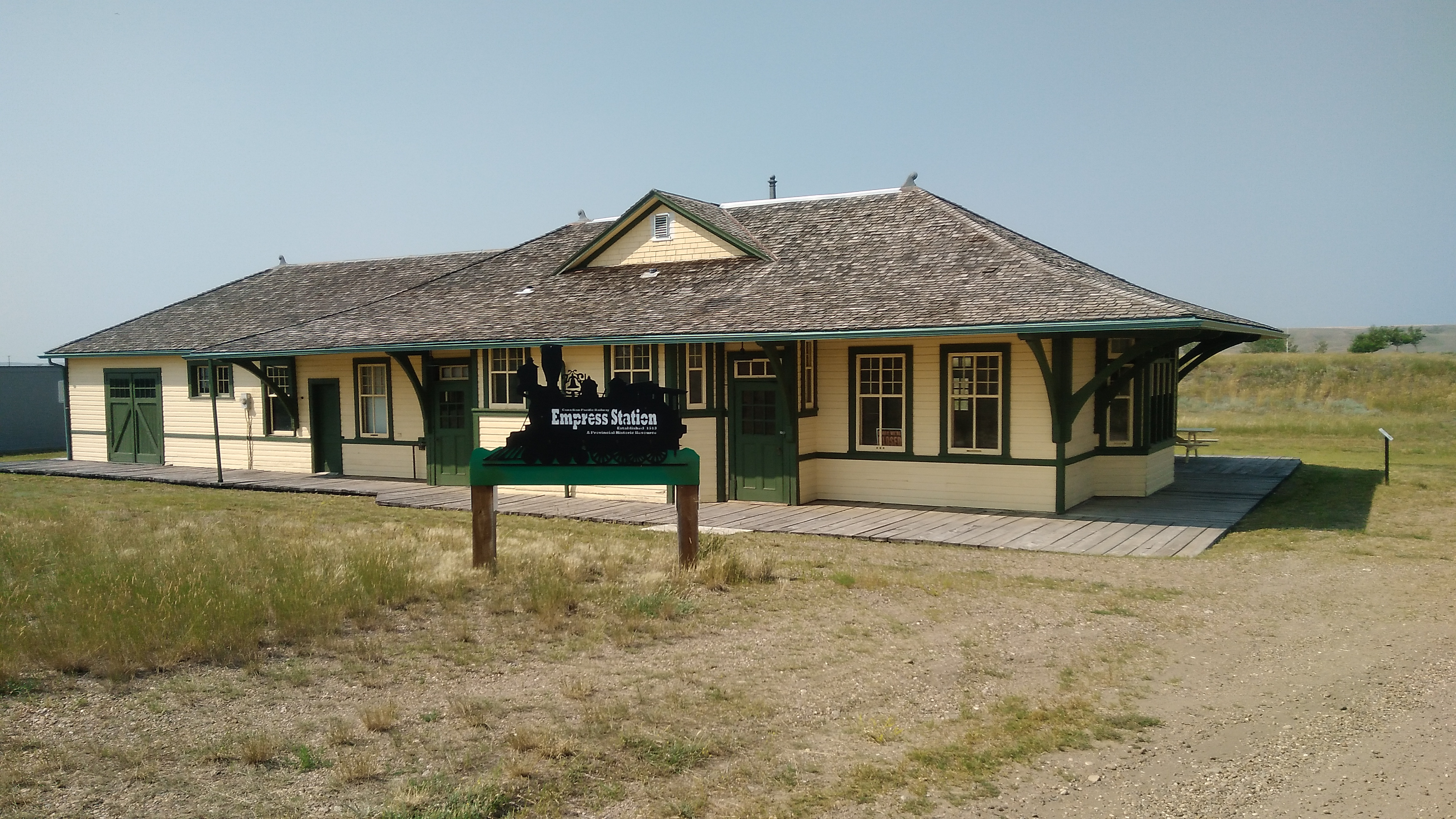
- Empress station in 2021.

General information
- Location: Empress, Alberta; Canada
- Coordinates: 50.9593°N 110.0079°W
- Owner: Canadian Pacific Railway

History
- Opened: October 21, 1914
- Closed: 1972

Former services
Preceding station	Canadian Pacific Railway	Following station
Sharrow toward Irricana	Irricana – Swift Current	Estuary toward Swift Current

Heritage Railway Station (Canada)
- Designated: 2002
Location

Empress station is a one-storey timber building in Empress, Alberta, that formerly served as the community's Canadian Pacific Railway station. It was designated under the Heritage Railway Stations Protection Act on June 1, 1991. It was recognized as a provincial historic resource by the government of Alberta on June 28, 2002.

== See also ==
- List of designated heritage railway stations of Canada
