= Chapleau station =

Railway station in Ontario, Canada

Chapleau
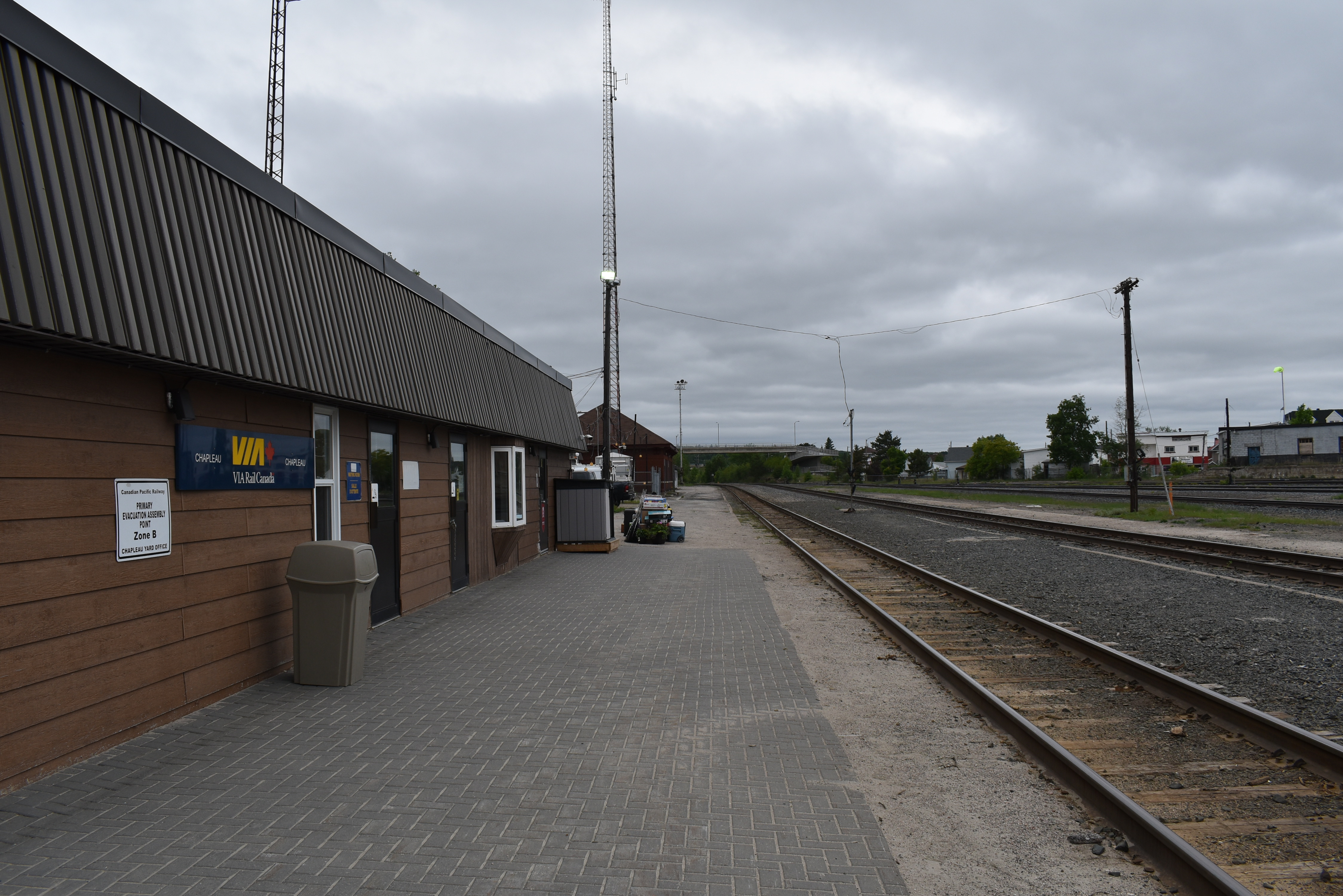
- Chapleau station in June 2023

General information
- Location: Dufferin St., Chapleau, ON
- Coordinates: 47°50′19″N 83°24′04″W
- Owner: Via Rail
- Tracks: 1

Construction
- Structure type: Unstaffed station
- Parking: Free

Services
Preceding station	Via Rail	Following station
Esher toward White River	Sudbury–White River	Devon toward Sudbury
Former services
Preceding station	Via Rail	Following station
Missanabie toward Vancouver	The Canadian before 1990	Biscotasing toward Toronto or Montreal
Preceding station	Canadian Pacific Railway	Following station
Nicholson toward Vancouver	Main Line	Nemegos toward Montreal Windsor
Location
- Location within Ontario Location within Canada

Chapleau station is an unstaffed station located in the heart of Chapleau, Ontario. This is a major intermediate stop for Via Rail's Sudbury – White River train, operating in between Sudbury and White River.
