= Farnham station (Quebec) =

Railway station in Quebec, Canada

Coordinates: 45.2819°N 72.9789°W

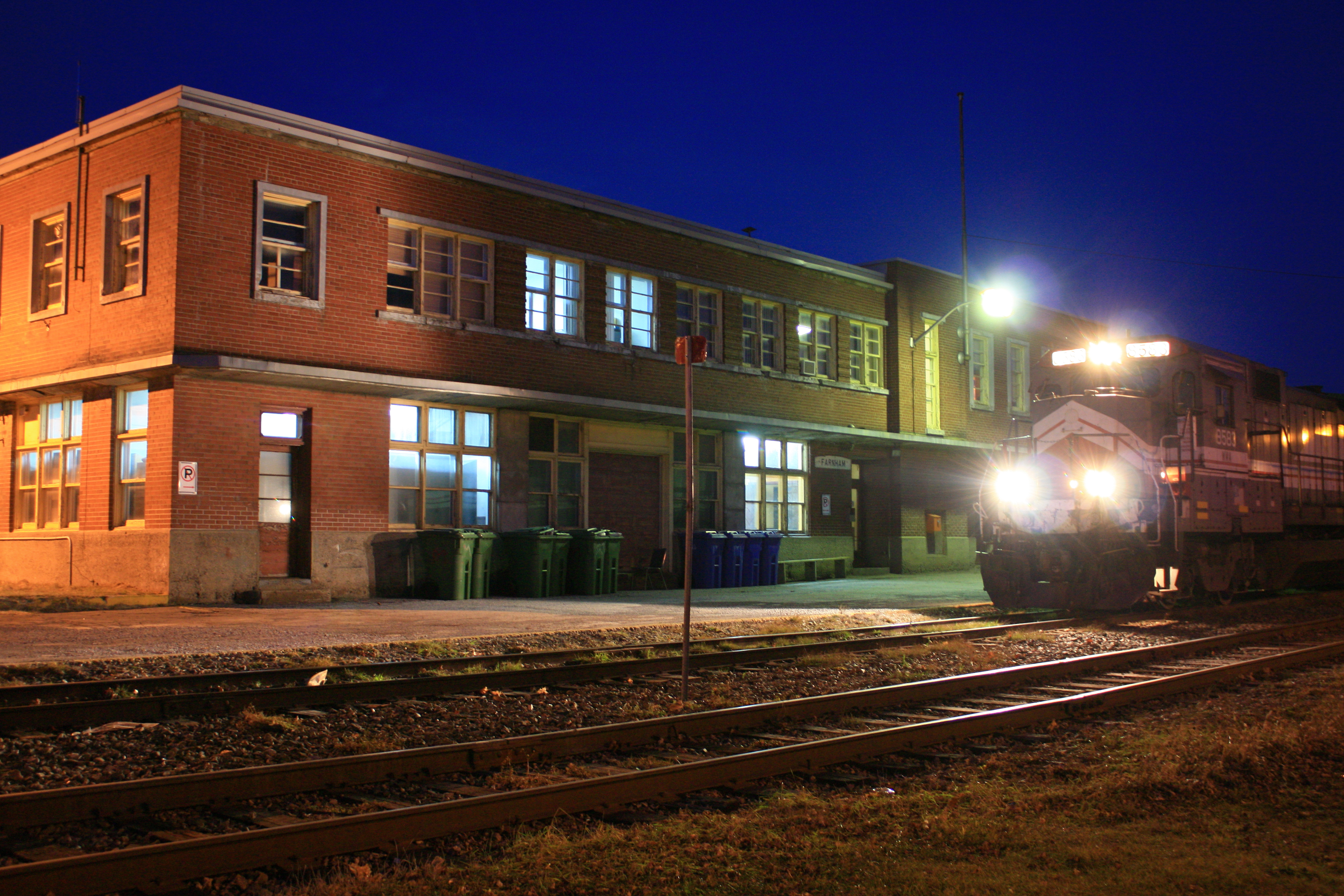
A Montreal, Maine and Atlantic Railway train at Farnham railway station

Farnham station is a disused railway station in Farnham, Quebec, Canada. Its address is 191 Victoria Road. The current station was built in 1950 to replace a previous station building (built in 1879–1882) which burned down in 1949, and opened to passenger service on March 8, 1951. The station saw its final passenger service on October 24, 1980. It was designated as a heritage railway station under the Heritage Railway Stations Protection Act in 1994.

The Farnham station building last served as the headquarters for the Canadian operations of the Montreal, Maine and Atlantic Railway (MMA), which declared bankruptcy in August 2013 as a direct result of the Lac-Mégantic derailment in July that year.

== See also ==
- List of designated heritage railway stations of Canada

Preceding station	Canadian Pacific Railway	Following station
Brookport toward Wells River	Montreal – Wells River	St. Brigide toward Montreal Windsor
