= Cartier station (Ontario) =

Railway station in Unorganized North Sudbury District, Canada

Cartier
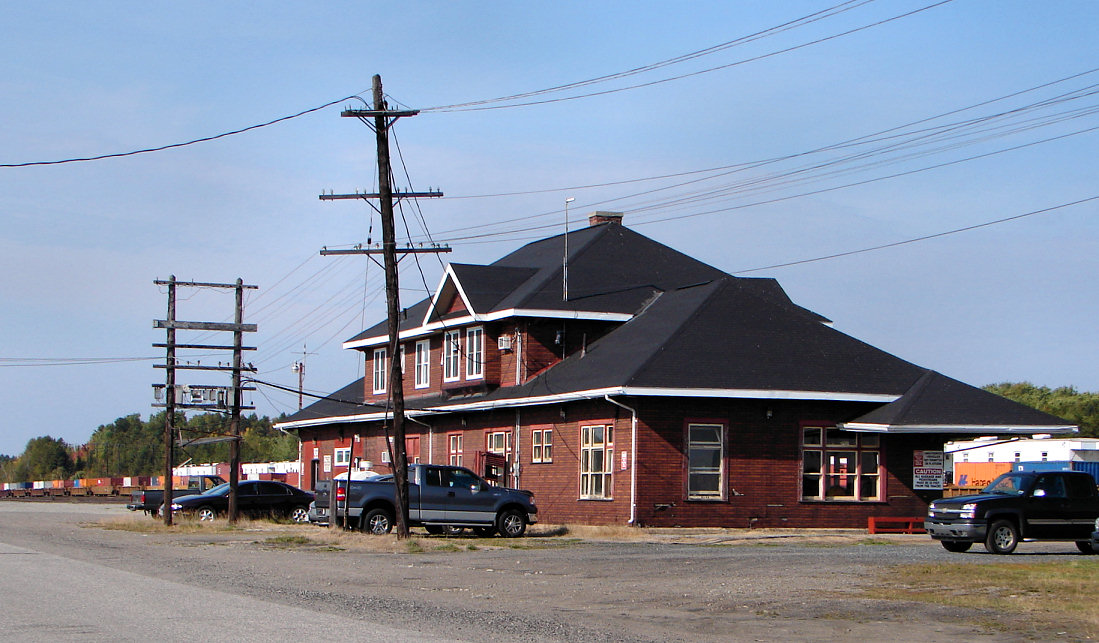

General information
- Location: Cartier, ON; Canada
- Coordinates: 46.7061°N 81.5574°W
- Owner: Via Rail

Construction
- Parking: Yes

Other information
- Status: Sign post

Services
Preceding station	Via Rail	Following station
Benny toward White River	Sudbury–White River	Levack toward Sudbury
Former services
Preceding station	Via Rail	Following station
Biscotasing toward Vancouver	The Canadian before 1990	Sudbury toward Toronto or Montreal
Preceding station	Canadian Pacific Railway	Following station
Geneva toward Vancouver	Main Line	Windy Lake toward Montreal Windsor
Location

Cartier station is located in Cartier, Ontario, which is served by Via Rail's Sudbury – White River train as a stop on request station.

== See also ==
- List of designated heritage railway stations of Canada
