= Salmo station =

Railway station in British Columbia, Canada

Salmo railway station
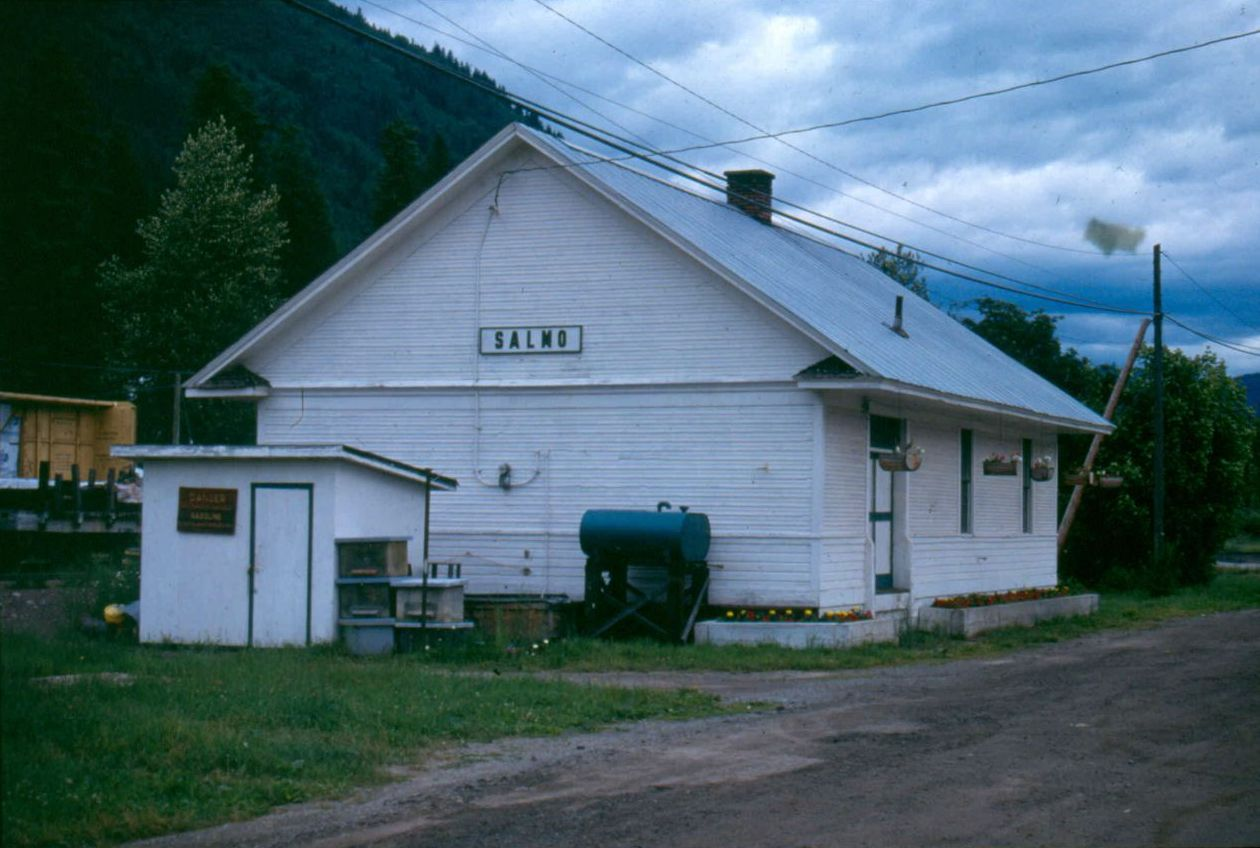

General information
- Location: Railway Avenue (Hwy. 6), Salmo, British Columbia; Canada
- Coordinates: 49°11′41″N 117°16′48″W
- Lines: Great Northern Railway; Burlington Northern Railway

History
- Opened: 1913

Former services
Preceding station	Great Northern Railway	Following station
Erie toward Marcus	Marcus – Nelson	Ymir toward Nelson
Location

The Salmo station (located in Salmo, British Columbia, Canada) was built by the Great Northern Railway (U.S.) that later become the Burlington Northern Railroad along the Nelson and Fort Sheppard Railway, a branch line extending north into Canada. The 1-story, wood-frame, railway station was completed in 1913 and consists of a waiting room, ticket office and the freight and baggage room. The station was built as part of a move by the Northern Railway to gain customers from the dominant railway in the region, the Canadian Pacific Railway.

The building was designated a historic railway station in 1992.
