= Dauphin station =

Railway station in Manitoba, Canada

Dauphin
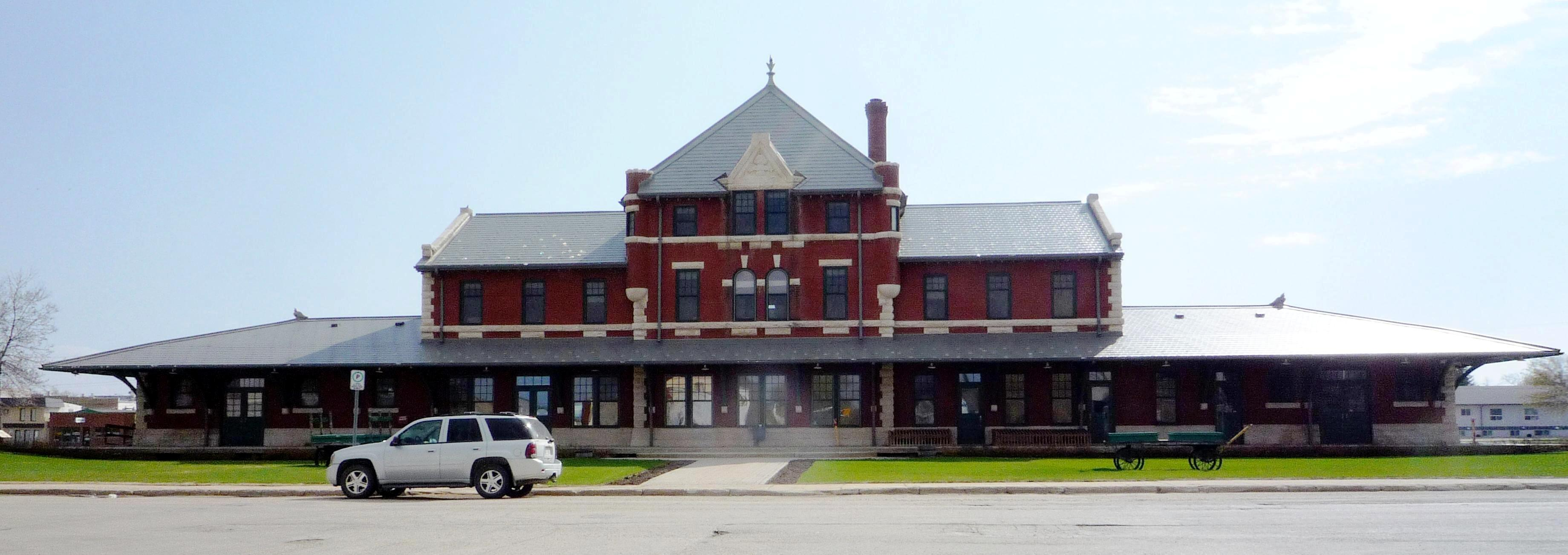

General information
- Location: 101 First Ave. N. Dauphin, MB; R7N 1G8, Canada
- Coordinates: 51.150641°N 100.051847°W
- Line: Winnipeg – Churchill train
- Platforms: 2
- Tracks: 1

Construction
- Structure type: Sign post

History
- Opened: 1912
- Former names: Lake Manitoba Railway and Canal Company; Canadian Northern Railway

Services
Preceding station	Via Rail	Following station
Gilbert Plains toward Churchill	Winnipeg–Churchill	Ochre River toward Winnipeg
Former services
Preceding station	Canadian National Railway	Following station
Ashville toward Calgary	Calgary – Winnipeg	Paulson toward Winnipeg
Valley River toward North Battleford	North Battleford – Winnipeg via Swan River and Hallboro	Paulson toward Winnipeg
Valley River toward Winnipegosis	Winnipegosis – Rorketon	Paulson toward Rorketon
Location

The Dauphin railway station is located in Dauphin, Manitoba, Canada. The station is served by Via Rail's Winnipeg – Churchill train.

The station was built in 1912 by the Canadian Northern Railway to a design by architect John Schofield. The station was designated a Heritage Railway Station of Canada in 1990. The station was designated as a Manitoba historic site on 27 January 1998, and is marked with a Manitoba Heritage Council commemorative plaque.

== Dauphin Railway Museum ==
The station is home to the Dauphin Railway Museum, which features railroad artifacts and displays about rail service in the region, the Canadian Northern Railway and later Canadian National Railway. Exhibits include a caboose, roundhouse and turntable, lamps, tools, photos, a motor car (jigger), an HO scale model rail, and a geographic display of steam/diesel era (1954–1965).

== See also ==
- List of designated heritage railway stations of Canada
