= Cartier, Ontario =

Cartier
- Unincorporated community
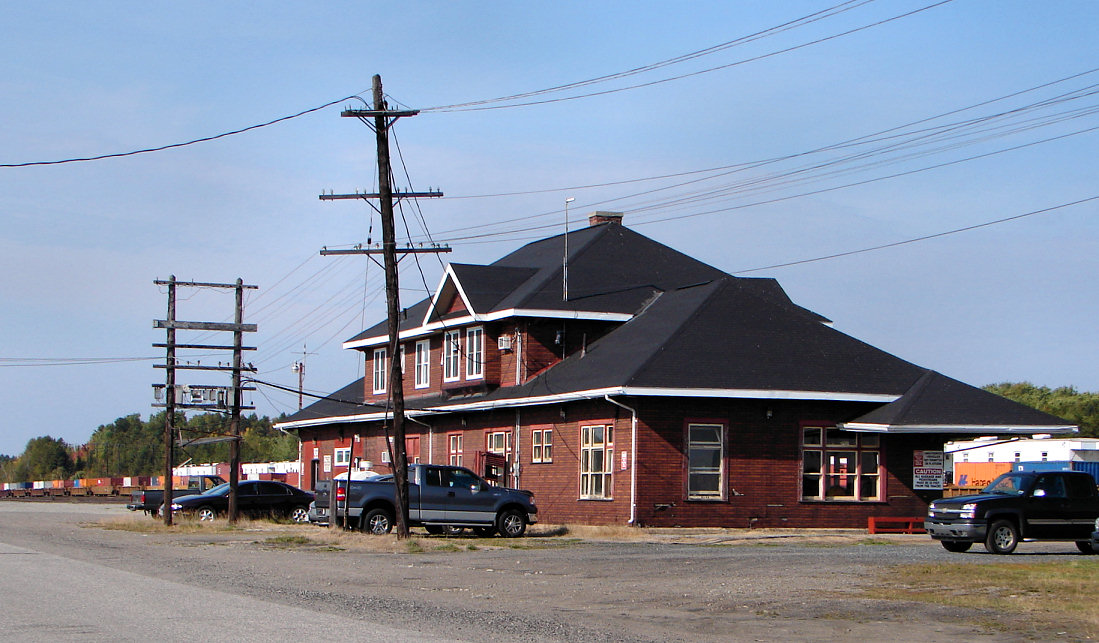
- Railroad station in Cartier

- Location within Ontario
- Coordinates: 46°42′23″N 81°33′14″W
- Country: Canada
- Province: Ontario
- District: Sudbury
- Census subdiv.: Unorg. North Sudbury
- Established: 1880s

Government
  - Type: Local services board
  - Governing Body: Cartier Local Services Board
  - MP: Jim Belanger (Conservative)
  - MPP: France Gélinas (NDP)

Area
  - Total: 58.41 km^{2} (22.55 sq mi)

Population (2021)
  - Total: 218
  - Density: 3.7/km^{2} (9.6/sq mi)
- Time zone: UTC−5 (EST)
  - Summer (DST): UTC−4 (EDT)
- Postal code: P0M
- Area code(s): 705

Cartier is a community in the Canadian province of Ontario, located in the Sudbury District, approximately 20 kilometres (12 mi) north of the northwestern city limits of Greater Sudbury along Highway 144. It is a designated place administered by a local services board, and had a population of 218 in the 2021 Canadian census.

== Geography ==
Cartier is commonly considered to be part of Greater Sudbury's metropolitan area, but is not officially counted as such by Statistics Canada as it is not part of an incorporated municipality. Statistics Canada classifies the township as part of the Sudbury, Unorganized, North Part census subdivision.

Halfway Lake Provincial Park is located approximately 20 kilometres (12 mi) north of Cartier.

== History ==
The community formed after the Canadian Pacific Railway was built in the 1880s. In 1885 the community was known as Archer. In 1888 it was officially named Cartier after the township, which was named to honour Sir George-Étienne Cartier (1814–1873), joint premier of the province of Canada with Sir John A. Macdonald from 1857 to 1862. The township was named by surveyor H. B. Proudfoot.

The Cartier railway station was built in 1910, and extensively renovated in 1948. It was designated as a Heritage Railway Station of Canada in 1993.

== Demographics ==
In the 2021 Census of Population conducted by Statistics Canada, Cartier had a population of 218 living in 103 of its 115 total private dwellings, a change of −9.5% from its 2016 population of 241. With a land area of 58.41 km^{2} (22.55 sq mi), it had a population density of 3.7/km^{2} (9.7/sq mi) in 2021.

Historical census populations – Cartier, Ontario
Year	Pop.	±%
2006	302	—
2011	244	−19.2%
2016	241	−1.2%
2021	218	−9.5%
Source: Statistics Canada

== Transportation ==
Prior to 1964, Cartier was the northern terminus of provincial highway 544 from Sudbury, which was renumbered as Highway 144 when it was extended northerly to Timmins.

Cartier station, a stop-on-request station, is served by Via Rail's Sudbury – White River train. Cartier is also a flag stop on Ontario Northland's motor coach service from Sudbury to Hearst.
