= Kenora station =

Railway station in Ontario, Canada

Kenora
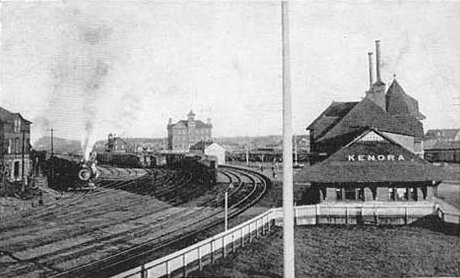
- View of the station, circa 1906

General information
- Location: Railway Street, Kenora, Ontario; Canada
- Coordinates: 49°46′05″N 94°29′12″W

History
- Opened: 1899
- Closed: 1990
- Former names: Canadian Pacific Railway

Former services
Preceding station	Via Rail	Following station
Whitemouth toward Vancouver	The Canadian before 1990	Dryden toward Toronto or Montreal
Preceding station	Canadian Pacific Railway	Following station
Keewatin toward Vancouver	Main Line	Margach toward Montreal Windsor

Heritage Railway Station (Canada)
- Designated: 1991
- Reference no.: 4545
Location

Kenora station is a heritage Canadian Pacific Railway station in Kenora, Ontario.

== History ==
The one-and-a-half-storey, brick and stone railway station was built in 1899. In the early 20th century, the station featured a triangular-shaped garden and fountain area along the left of the structure.

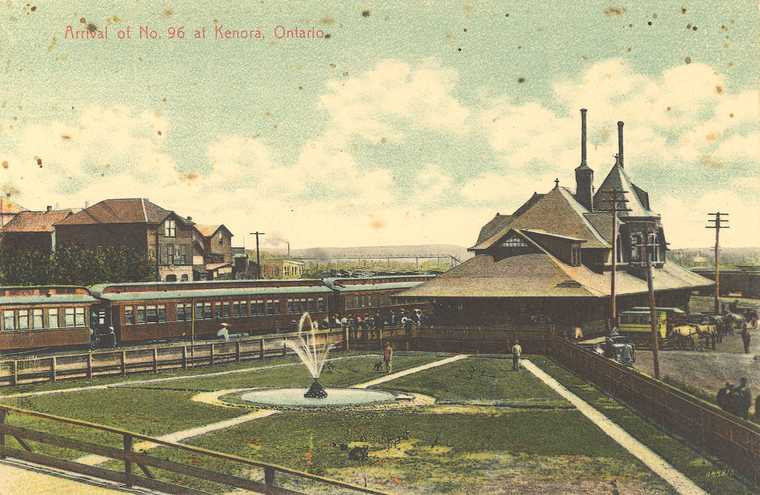
Colour postcard showing the garden area, circa 1910

The garden area was a feature of many Canadian Pacific Railway (CPR) stations of the era, starting in Montreal and going west. The railway felt this help attract settlers to the west. "Station gardens, characterized as effective advertisements for prairie fertility, were a prominent part of these campaigns. The station, especially in the west, was often the focus of the community and a major link with the outside world. Civic boosters said the only evidence of a town's worth immediately seen by a prospective settler was the condition of town's railway station." Kenora's is shown in period photographs as an early example of the CPR railway garden.
