= Moose Jaw station (Canadian Pacific Railway) =

Railway station in Saskatchewan, Canada

Coordinates: 50.3892°N 105.5348°W

Moose Jaw
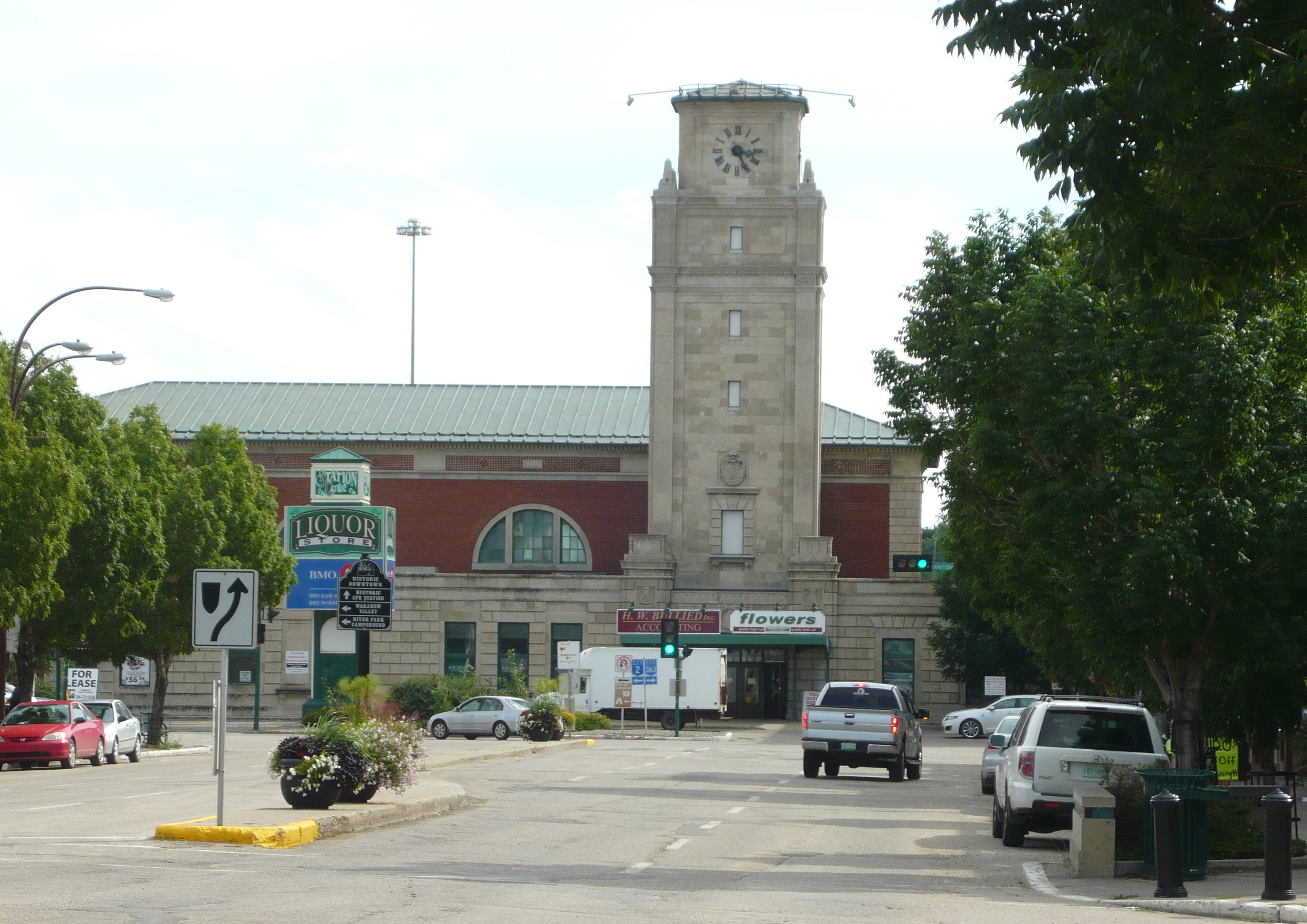
- Station Clock Tower

General information
- Location: Manitoba Street East, Moose Jaw, Saskatchewan
- Line: Canadian Pacific Railway

History
- Opened: 1922

Former services
Preceding station	Via Rail	Following station
Swift Current toward Vancouver	The Canadian before 1990	Regina toward Toronto
Preceding station	Canadian Pacific Railway	Following station
Boharm toward Vancouver	Main Line	Pasqua toward Montreal Windsor
Terminus	Moose Jaw – North Portal	Pasqua toward North Portal
Belbeck toward Macklin	Macklin – Moose Jaw	Terminus
Archive toward Swift Current	Swift Current – Moose Jaw via Wymark	Terminus
Location

Moose Jaw station is a former railway station in Moose Jaw, Saskatchewan, Canada. It was designed by Hugh G. Jones and built by the Canadian Pacific Railway from 1920 to 1922. The station comprises a two-story waiting area, a four-storey office block and a six-storey Tyndall stone clock tower. The building was designated a historic railway station in 1991.

The station was a stop for Canadian Pacific Railway passenger trains. The station was also a transfer point to the Minneapolis, St. Paul and Sault Ste. Marie Railroad, also known as the Soo Line Railroad, which operated the Soo-Pacific from Saint Paul, Minnesota, to Portal, North Dakota, during the summer. It ran through to Vancouver via a connection with Canadian Pacific Railway's The Dominion at Moose Jaw. In the winter the Soo-Dominion terminated in Moose Jaw permitting a transfer to the Dominion. It was discontinued in December 1963.
