= Ernestown station =

Railway station in Ontario, Canada

Ernestown
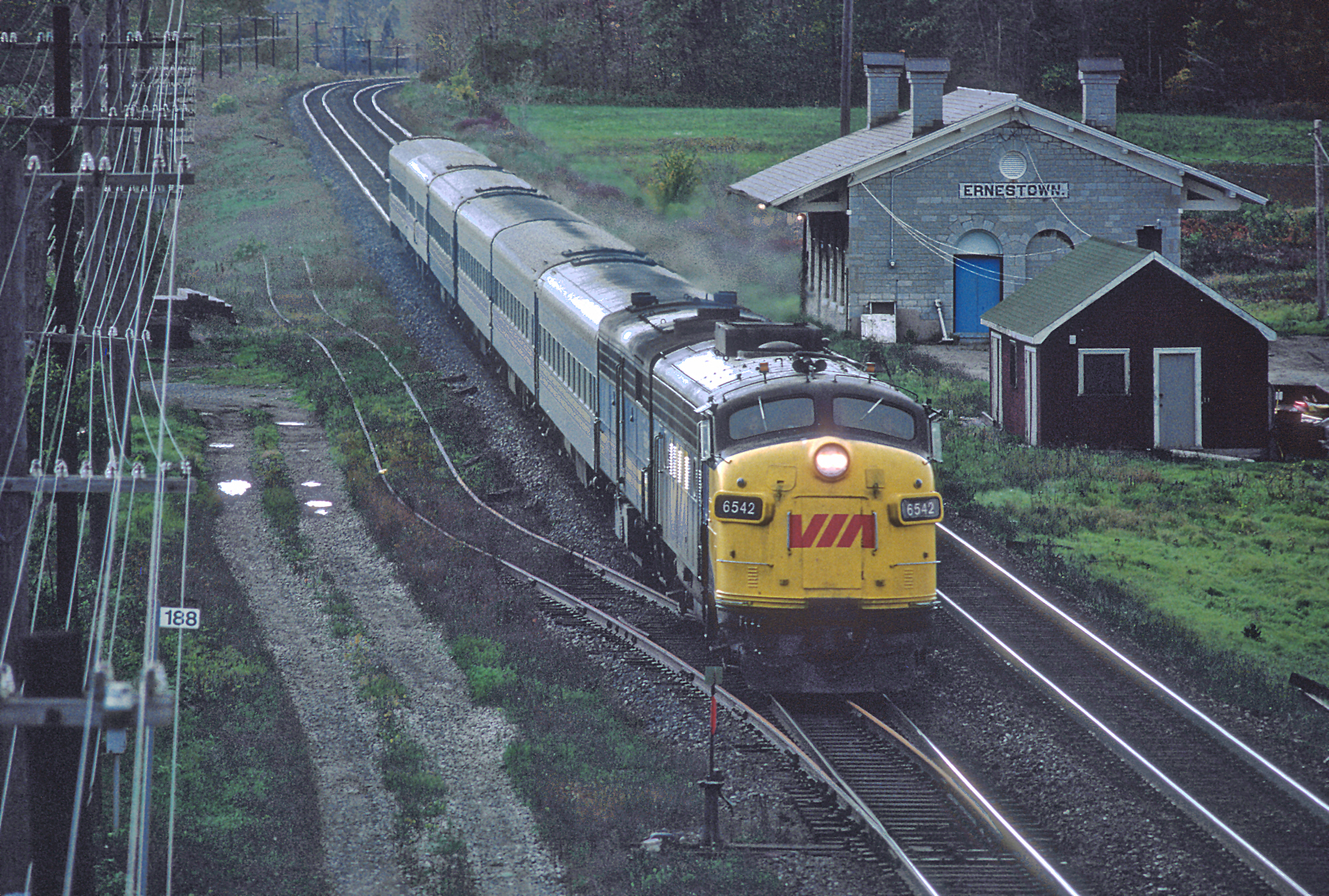
- The station in 1980.

General information
- Location: Canada
- Coordinates: 44°13′02″N 76°45′17″W

Construction
- Structure type: Historic railway station

History
- Opened: 1855
- Closed: circa 1973

Former services
Preceding station	Canadian National Railway	Following station
Fredericksburg toward Sarnia	Grand Trunk Railway; Main Line	Collin's Bay toward Montreal

Heritage Railway Station (Canada)
- Official name: Former Grand Trunk Railway Station
- Designated: 1992
- Reference no.: 4551

Ontario Heritage Act
- Official name: Ernestown Railway Station
- Designated: January 11, 1999
Location

Ernestown railway station in Loyalist, Ontario, Canada is a Heritage Railway Station, also protected under Part IV of the Ontario Heritage Act.

== History ==
The Ontario Heritage Act designation notes that the station is "one of only nine first-generation Grand Trunk Stations surviving of thirty-four stations built along the line in an Italianate style that had already become associated with railway buildings in Britain in the 1840s".
