= Trois-Rivières station =

Railway station in Quebec, Canada

Trois-Rivières
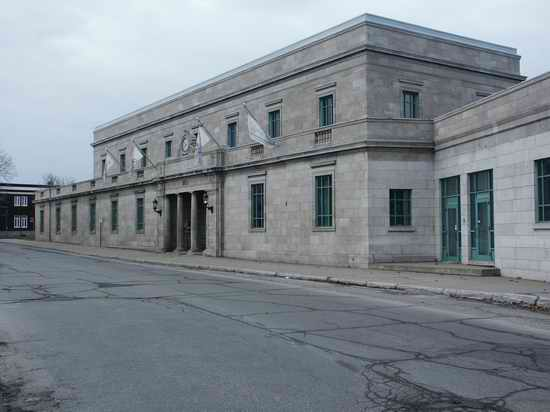
- Trois-Rivières Station

General information
- Location: 1075 rue Champflour; Trois-Rivières; Canada
- Coordinates: 46.349°N 72.55°W
- Owner: Ville de Trois-Rivières

History
- Opened: 1924
- Closed: 1990

Former services
Preceding station	Canadian Pacific Railway	Following station
Pointe-du-Lac toward Montreal Windsor	Montreal – Quebec	Redmill toward Quebec
Cooke toward Grand-Mère	Grand-Mère – Trois-Rivières	Terminus
Cap-de-la-Madeleine toward Grandes-Piles	Grandes-Piles – Trois-Rivières	Terminus
Location

Trois-Rivières station is a former railway station in Trois-Rivières, Québec, Canada. It was designated as a federal heritage site in 1990.

== History ==
The station was built in 1924 to replace the original 1872 structure which served as the Trois-Rivierès stop along the route connecting Québec City and Montréal via the North Shore of the St. Lawrence River.

The station was acquired by Via Rail Canada in December 1985. In 1987 it became an intermodal station serving intercity bus traffic as well as trains. Passenger train service to Trois-Rivierès ceased as a result of the 1990 Via Rail cuts, and bus service to the station ceased in 1998. The station is still owned by VIA Rail, and leased by the City of Trois-Rivierès. The station building is used for purposes unrelated to transportation.
