= Swift Current station =

Railway station in Saskatchewan, Canada

Coordinates: 50.28176°N 107.79974°W

Swift Current
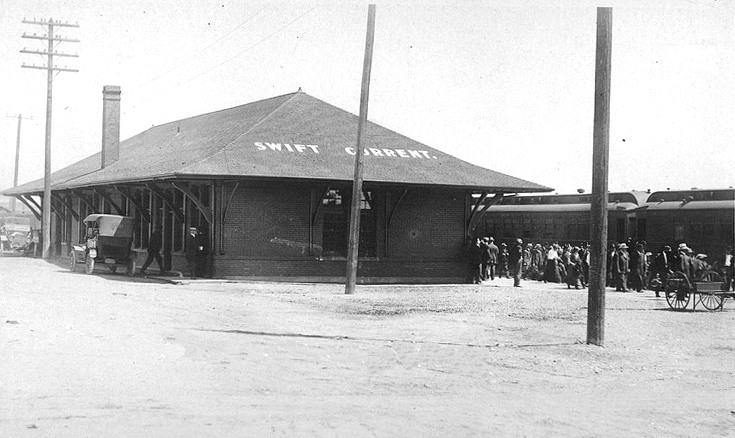
- Swift Current Station, circa 1918.

General information
- Location: Railway Station Street East, Swift Current, Saskatchewan
- Line: Canadian Pacific Railway

History
- Opened: 1907

Former services
Preceding station	Via Rail	Following station
Medicine Hat toward Vancouver	The Canadian before 1990	Moose Jaw toward Toronto
Preceding station	Canadian Pacific Railway	Following station
Beverley toward Vancouver	Main Line	Terminus
Terminus	Swift Current – Stewart Valley	Aikins toward Stewart Valley
Terminus	Swift Current – Moose Jaw via Wymark	Dunelm toward Moose Jaw
Terminus	Swift Current – Meyronne	Dunelm toward Meyronne
Player toward Simmie	Simmie – Swift Current	Terminus

Heritage Railway Station (Canada)
- Designated: 1991
Location

The Swift Current station is a railway station in Swift Current, Saskatchewan, Canada. It was built by the Canadian Pacific Railway, but is now only used by Canadian Pacific train crews. The station comprises the following three buildings:

- one-storey brick building including a passenger waiting room and ticket office (built in 1907 and extended in 1923)
- two-storey brick dining hall and telegraph building (built between 1908 and 1909 and extended in 1957)
- one-storey brick express building (built in 1912)

The building was designated a historic railway station in 1991. The City of Swift Current owns all three buildings, leasing the actual train station to CP while the other two buildings are vacant.

== See also ==
- List of designated heritage railway stations of Canada
