= Empress, Alberta =

Empress
- Village
- Village of Empress
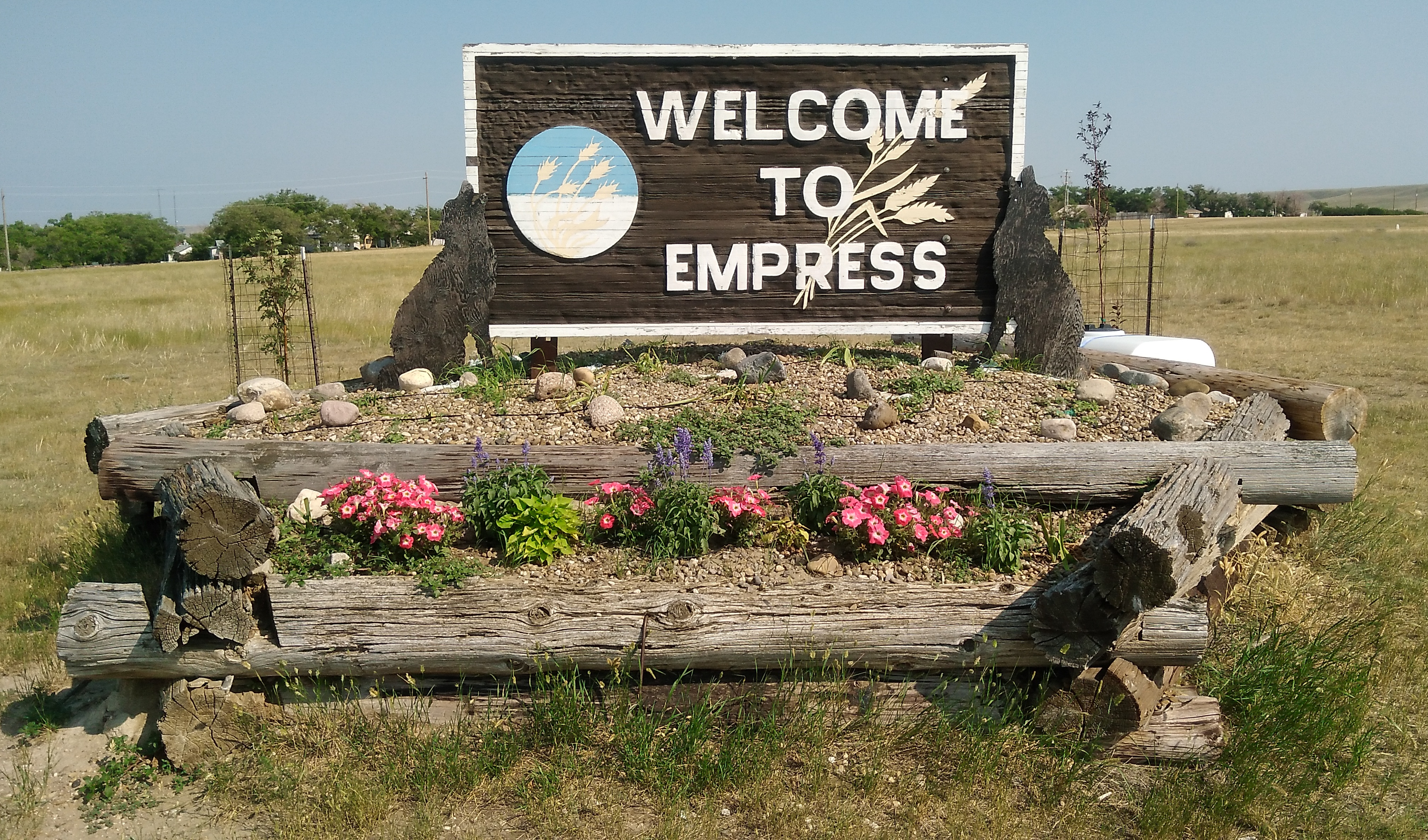

- Location in Special Area No. 2

- Location of Empress in Alberta
- Coordinates: 50°57′17.4″N 110°00′31.4″W
- Country: Canada
- Province: Alberta
- Planning region: Red Deer
- Special Area: No. 2
- Incorporated
  - Village: February 5, 1914

Government
  - Mayor: Dawna Martin (2024-Jul-17)
  - Governing body: Empress Village Council

Area (2021)
  - Land: 1.58 km^{2} (0.61 sq mi)
- Elevation: 615 m (2,018 ft)

Population (2021)
  - Total: 148
  - Density: 93.5/km^{2} (242/sq mi)
- Time zone: UTC−06:00 (Alberta Time)
- Postal code span: T0J 1E0
- Highways: Highway 562; Highway 899
- Waterways: Red Deer River; South Saskatchewan River
- Website: villageofempress.com

Empress is a village in southern Alberta, Canada that is adjacent to the provincial boundary between Alberta and Saskatchewan. It is 121 km (75 mi) north of Medicine Hat. The village was named, in 1913, for Queen Victoria, who was also Empress of India. In the past it was known as the "Hub of the West", connecting major cities together by the Canadian Pacific Railway.

It is located on the southern bank above the Red Deer River, 9 km (5.6 mi) northwest of the confluence of Red Deer River and South Saskatchewan River, at an elevation of 650 metres (2,130 ft). It is connected to Buffalo Trail by Highway 899 and Highway 562.

== Demographics ==
In the 2021 Census of Population conducted by Statistics Canada, the Village of Empress had a population of 148 living in 69 of its 112 total private dwellings, a change of 9.6% from its 2016 population of 135. With a land area of 1.58 km^{2} (0.61 sq mi), it had a population density of 93.7/km^{2} (242.6/sq mi) in 2021.

The population of the Village of Empress according to its 2017 municipal census is 160.

In the 2016 Census of Population conducted by Statistics Canada, the Village of Empress recorded a population of 135 living in 58 of its 71 total private dwellings, a −28.2% change from its 2011 population of 188. With a land area of 1.58 km^{2} (0.61 sq mi), it had a population density of 85.4/km^{2} (221.3/sq mi) in 2016.

== Climate ==
Located in the steppe region known as Palliser's Triangle, Empress experiences a semi-arid climate (Köppen climate classification BSk). Winters are long, cold and dry, while summers are short, but with average daytime highs that are warm to hot, though nighttime lows are cool. Spring and autumn are quite short, essentially transition periods between winter and summer. Wide diurnal temperature ranges are regular, due to the aridity and moderately high elevation. Low humidity is prevalent throughout the year. Annual precipitation is very low, with an average of 311.6 mm (12.27 in), and is heavily concentrated in the warmer months. On average, the coldest month is January, with a mean temperature of −12 °C (10 °F), while the warmest is July, with a mean temperature of 19.8 °C (67.6 °F). The driest month is February, with an average of 8.6 mm (0.34 in) of precipitation, while the wettest is June, with an average of 68.9 millimetres (2.71 in).

Climate data for Empress Climate ID: 3022400; coordinates 50°57′21″N 110°00′22″W; elevation: 612.0 m (2,007.9 ft); 1981-2010 normals
Month	Jan	Feb	Mar	Apr	May	Jun	Jul	Aug	Sep	Oct	Nov	Dec	Year
Record high °C (°F)	12.0 (53.6)	17.0 (62.6)	28.0 (82.4)	32.0 (89.6)	36.0 (96.8)	41.1 (106.0)	42.2 (108.0)	41.7 (107.1)	38.3 (100.9)	31.7 (89.1)	23.0 (73.4)	15.0 (59.0)	42.2 (108.0)
Mean daily maximum °C (°F)	−6.5 (20.3)	−2.6 (27.3)	4.8 (40.6)	13.9 (57.0)	19.7 (67.5)	23.8 (74.8)	27.4 (81.3)	27.0 (80.6)	20.4 (68.7)	12.9 (55.2)	1.7 (35.1)	−4.7 (23.5)	11.5 (52.7)
Daily mean °C (°F)	−12.0 (10.4)	−8.3 (17.1)	−1.2 (29.8)	6.6 (43.9)	12.5 (54.5)	16.9 (62.4)	19.8 (67.6)	19.1 (66.4)	12.8 (55.0)	5.8 (42.4)	−3.8 (25.2)	−10.1 (13.8)	4.8 (40.6)
Mean daily minimum °C (°F)	−17.5 (0.5)	−14.1 (6.6)	−7.2 (19.0)	−0.7 (30.7)	5.2 (41.4)	9.9 (49.8)	12.1 (53.8)	11.1 (52.0)	5.2 (41.4)	−1.2 (29.8)	−9.3 (15.3)	−15.4 (4.3)	−1.8 (28.8)
Record low °C (°F)	−47.8 (−54.0)	−45.6 (−50.1)	−40.0 (−40.0)	−28.9 (−20.0)	−14.4 (6.1)	−4.4 (24.1)	0.0 (32.0)	0.0 (32.0)	−10.0 (14.0)	−26.0 (−14.8)	−36.5 (−33.7)	−45.0 (−49.0)	−47.8 (−54.0)
Average precipitation mm (inches)	14.2 (0.56)	8.6 (0.34)	12.7 (0.50)	18.7 (0.74)	38.8 (1.53)	68.9 (2.71)	50.3 (1.98)	33.9 (1.33)	28.5 (1.12)	11.5 (0.45)	10.8 (0.43)	14.8 (0.58)	311.6 (12.27)
Average rainfall mm (inches)	0.2 (0.01)	0.3 (0.01)	2.1 (0.08)	13.8 (0.54)	38.2 (1.50)	68.9 (2.71)	50.3 (1.98)	33.9 (1.33)	28.1 (1.11)	7.5 (0.30)	1.0 (0.04)	0.4 (0.02)	244.5 (9.63)
Average snowfall cm (inches)	13.9 (5.5)	8.3 (3.3)	10.6 (4.2)	4.9 (1.9)	0.7 (0.3)	0.0 (0.0)	0.0 (0.0)	0.0 (0.0)	0.5 (0.2)	4.1 (1.6)	9.8 (3.9)	14.8 (5.8)	67.1 (26.4)
Average precipitation days (≥ 0.2 mm)	4.3	2.6	3.6	3.5	6.5	10.0	6.9	5.8	5.4	3.3	3.0	4.3	59.1
Average rainy days (≥ 0.2 mm)	0.12	0.12	0.5	2.7	6.4	10.0	6.9	5.8	5.4	2.4	0.32	0.24	40.8
Average snowy days (≥ 0.2 cm)	4.2	2.5	3.1	1.0	0.2	0.0	0.0	0.0	0.04	1.1	2.6	4.0	18.8
Source: Environment and Climate Change Canada

== See also ==
- Empress Airport
- Empress Canadian Pacific Railway Station
- List of communities in Alberta
- List of villages in Alberta
- Royal eponyms in Canada
