= Sioux Lookout station =

Railway station in Ontario, Canada

Sioux Lookout
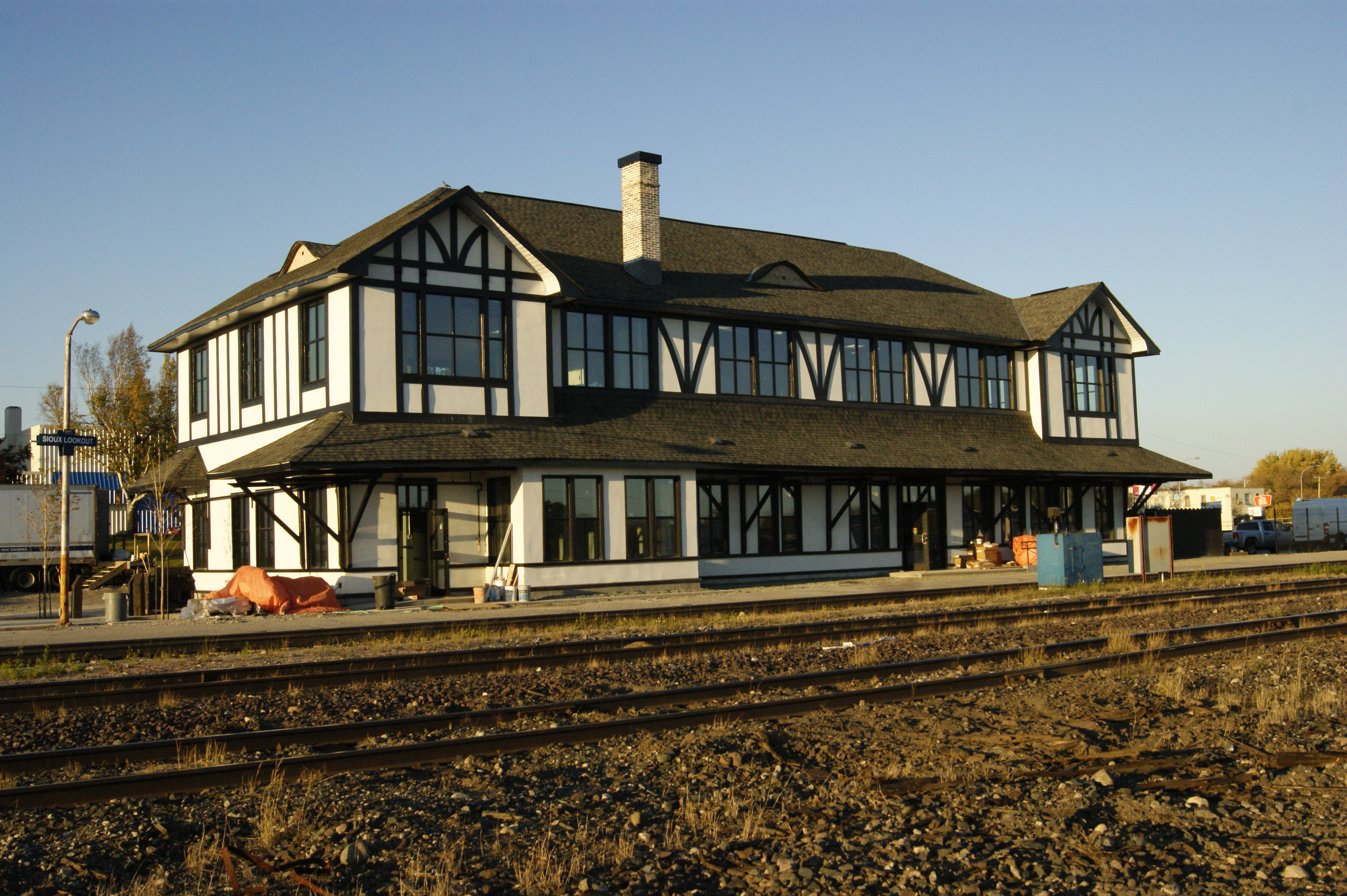

General information
- Location: 53 Front Street; Sioux Lookout, Ontario; Canada
- Coordinates: 50°05′51″N 91°54′58″W
- Owner: Via Rail

Construction
- Structure type: Shelter
- Accessible: Yes

History
- Opened: 1911

Services
Preceding station	Via Rail	Following station
Richan toward Vancouver	The Canadian	Savant Lake toward Toronto

Former services
Preceding station	Via Rail	Following station
Hudson toward Vancouver	Super Continental	Savant Lake toward Toronto
Preceding station	Canadian National Railway	Following station
Pelican toward Vancouver	Main Line	Superior Junction toward Montreal

Heritage Railway Station (Canada)
- Official name: CNR/VIA Rail Station
- Designated: 1993
- Reference no.: 6906
Location

Sioux Lookout railway station is located in the town of Sioux Lookout, Kenora District in northwestern Ontario, Canada. The station is on the Canadian National Railway transcontinental main line; it is used by Via Rail and served by transcontinental Canadian trains. The station was opened in 1911 and remodelled in 1937; it was listed on the Canadian Register in 2008. Via Rail uses a heated shack near the historic station building.

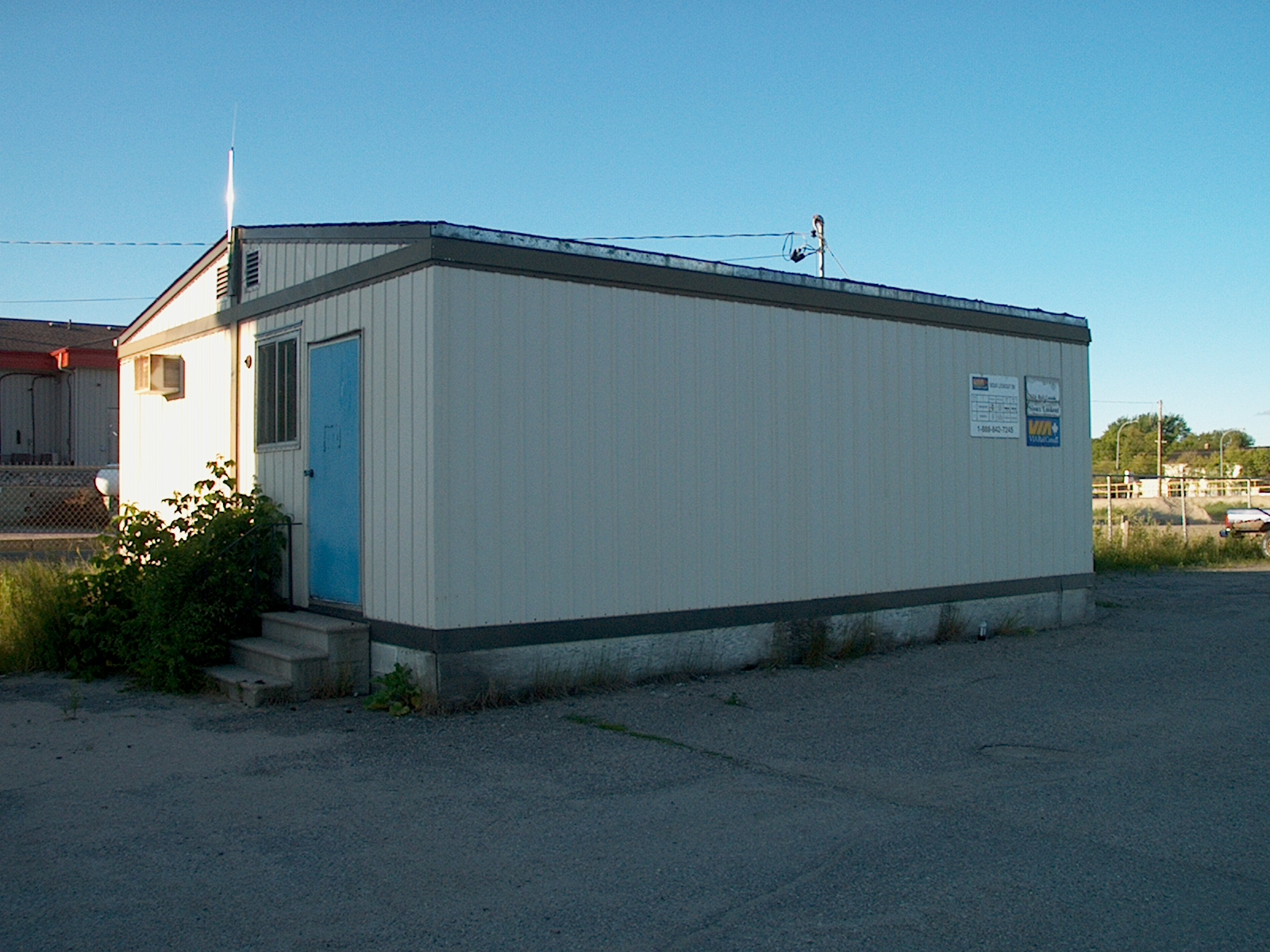
Shack used by Via Rail

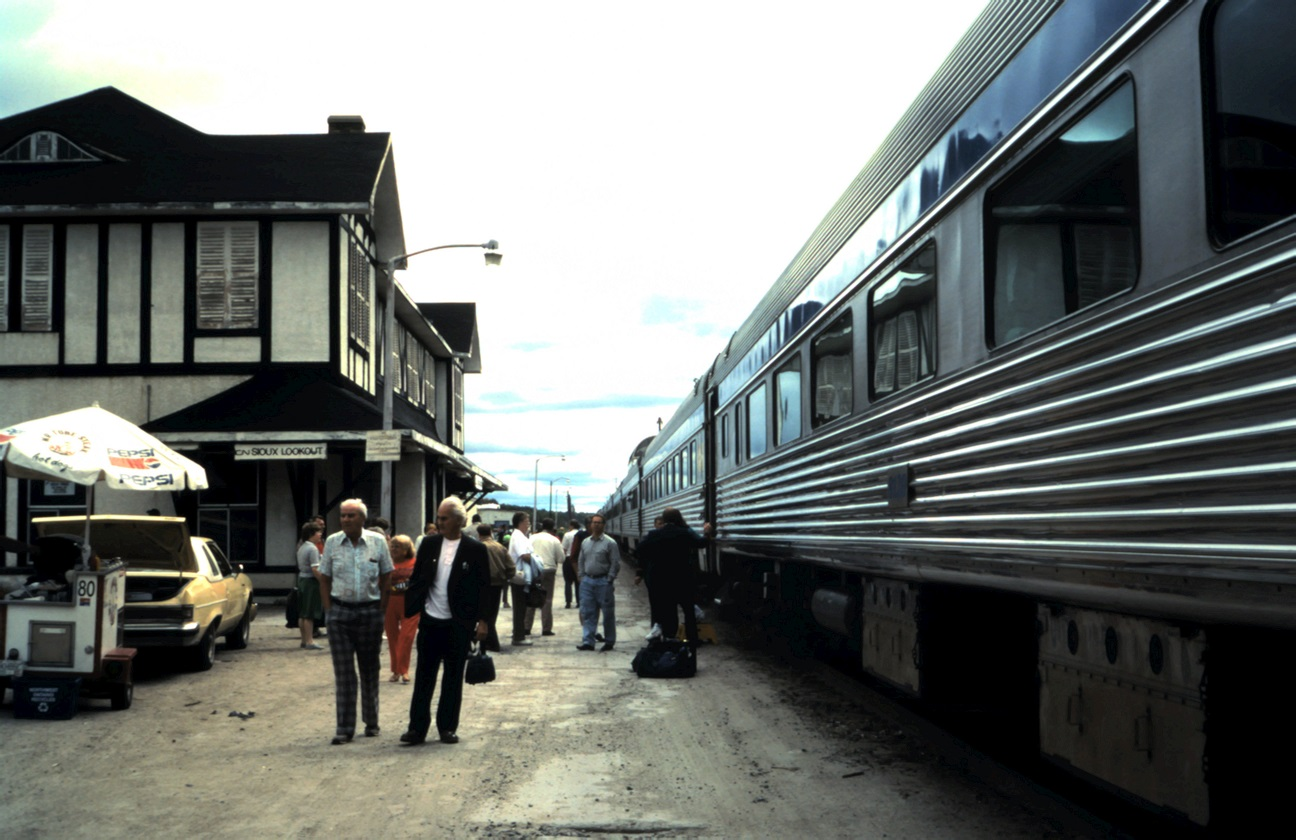
Westbound Canadian stops at Sioux Lookout in 1993.
