= Nelson station (British Columbia) =

Former railway station in British Columbia, Canada

Nelson
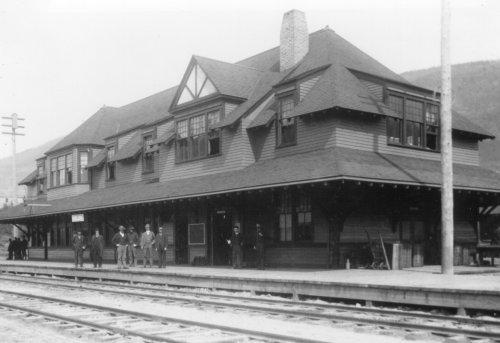

General information
- Location: 90 Baker Street, Nelson, BC; Canada
- Coordinates: 49°29′22″N 117°18′03″W

Other information
- Status: Closed

History
- Opened: 1900

Former services
Preceding station	Canadian Pacific Railway	Following station
Beasley toward Katz	Katz – Medicine Hat via Nelson and Lethbridge	Troup toward Medicine Hat
South Slocan toward Slocan City	Slocan City – Nelson	Terminus
Preceding station	Great Northern Railway	Following station
Apex toward Marcus	Marcus – Nelson	Terminus

Heritage Railway Station (Canada)
- Designated: 1992
- Reference no.: 4562
Location

The Nelson station (located in Nelson, British Columbia, Canada) and was built by the Canadian Pacific Railway in 1900. The 2-story, wood-frame, railway station is located near the lakefront to serve as an important meeting point between rail and steamboat transportation. This station is no longer used as a passenger station and the building has been designated a national heritage railway station. It is now home to the Nelson Chamber of Commerce, a coffee shop on the East end of the building, with the remainder being the city's visitor centre. The station was also used by Great Northern Railway's Nelson and Fort Sheppard Railway.
