= Sudbury station (Ontario) =

Railway station in Greater Sudbury, Canada

Sudbury
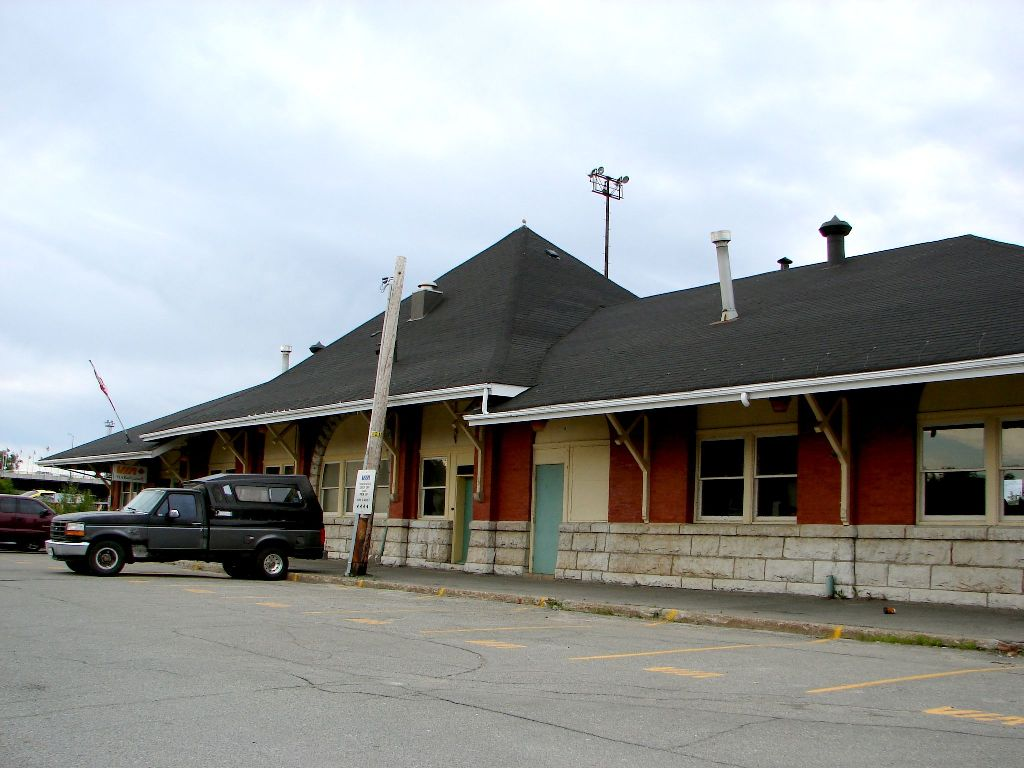

General information
- Location: 233 Elgin St., Greater Sudbury, Ontario; Canada
- Coordinates: 46°29′15″N 80°59′32″W
- Owner: Via Rail
- Platforms: 1 side platform
- Tracks: 1
- Connections: GOVA 3 4 10 14

Construction
- Structure type: Staffed station
- Parking: Free with permit

Other information
- Website: Sudbury train station

Services
| Preceding station | Via Rail | Following station |
|---|---|---|
| Azilda toward White River | Sudbury–White River | Terminus |
Former services
| Preceding station | Via Rail | Following station |
|---|---|---|
| Cartier toward Vancouver | The Canadian before 1990 | Sturgeon Falls toward Montreal |
| Cartier toward Vancouver | The Canadian before 1990 | Rutter toward Toronto |
| Thunder Bay toward Vancouver | Super Continental | Toronto Terminus |
| Preceding station | Canadian Pacific Railway | Following station |
| Azilda toward Vancouver | Main Line | Romford toward Montreal Windsor |
| Terminus | Sudbury – Toronto | Romford toward Toronto |
| Copper Cliff toward Sault Ste. Marie | Sault Ste. Marie – Sudbury | Terminus |
| Clara Belle toward Creighton | Creighton – Sudbury | Terminus |
Location
- Location within Ontario Location within Canada

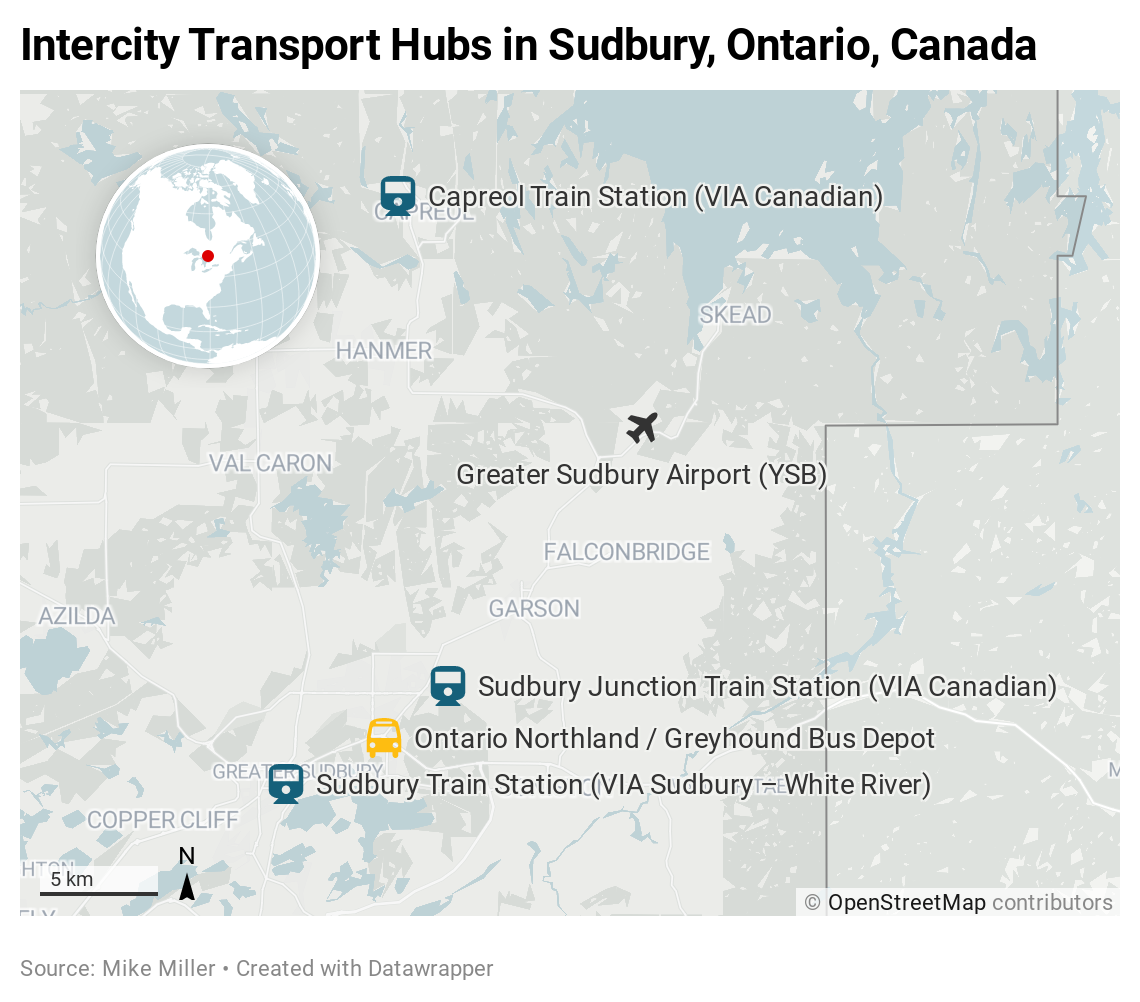
Intercity transport hubs in Sudbury, Ontario, Canada

Sudbury station is a railway station in Greater Sudbury, Ontario, Canada serving Via Rail. It is the eastern terminus of the Sudbury–White River train. Located in downtown Sudbury, this historic Romanesque station built in 1907 by Canadian Pacific Railway, is one of the two Via Rail stations in Sudbury, the other being Sudbury Junction station (serving The Canadian train) which is located 10 km away on the outskirts of the city. There is no shuttle service available between the two stations.

The station became the new home of the Sudbury Farmer's Market in 2013, following the 2012 purchase of the former Market Square by the Northern Ontario School of Architecture.

== Location ==
Sudbury station is located in downtown Sudbury at 233 Elgin Street near the intersection of Elgin, Minto and Van Horne streets. Its main entrance faces northeast to Elgin Street. Directly southwest of the station building, trains call at a low level platform adjacent to the Canadian Pacific Railway Cartier Subdivision and bordering on the Sudbury Marshalling Yard. North of the station and across Elgin street is the Sudbury Community Arena.

== See also ==
- Sudbury Junction station
- Capreol station
- Sudbury Ontario Northland Bus Terminal
- Sudbury Airport - (IATA: YSB, ICAO: CYSB)
- List of designated heritage railway stations of Canada
