= Medicine Hat station =

Heritage railway station in Alberta, Canada

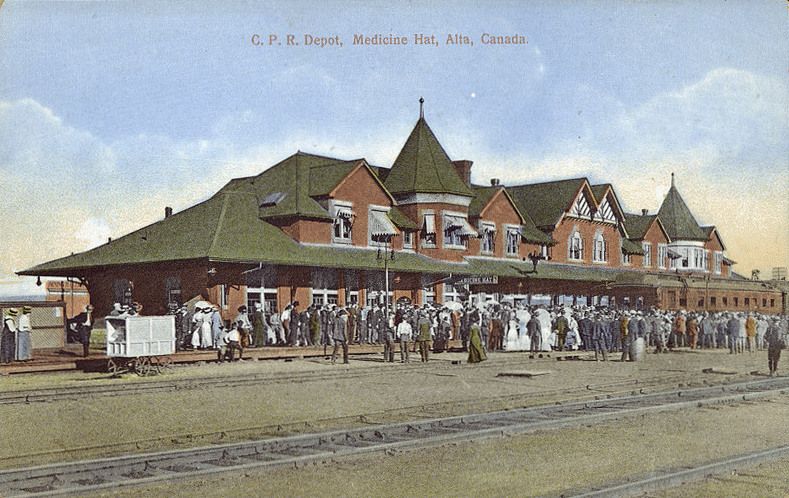
- Postcard showing the station, circa 1910.

General information
- Location: 402 North Railway Street Southeast, Medicine Hat, Alberta; Canada
- Coordinates: 50.0397°N 110.6716°W
- Lines: Canadian Pacific Kansas City, Via Rail, Canadian Pacific Railway

History
- Opened: 1906
- Rebuilt: 1911

Former services
Preceding station	Via Rail	Following station
Calgary toward Vancouver	The Canadian before 1990	Swift Current toward Toronto
Preceding station	Canadian Pacific Railway	Following station
Redcliff toward Vancouver	Main Line	Dunmore toward Montreal Windsor
Bullshead toward Katz	Katz – Medicine Hat via Nelson and Lethbridge	Terminus

Heritage Railway Station (Canada)
- Designated: 1991
- Reference no.: 9321
Location

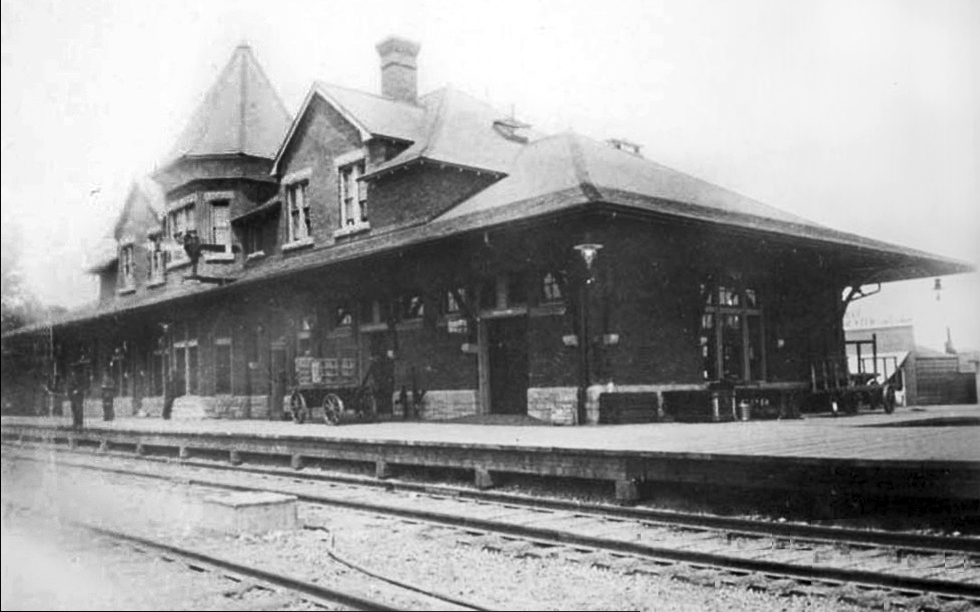
Photo of the station shortly after opening.

Medicine Hat station is a heritage railway station in Medicine Hat, Alberta. It was built by the Canadian Pacific Railway in 1906 and expanded in 1911–1912, using red brick from Medicine Hat and sandstone from Calgary.

== Passenger services ==
Notable passenger trains included the Imperial Limited, which ran from 1899 to 1933, which got replaced by the Dominion, which ran from 1933 to 1966, and the Canadian from 1955 to 1990, which replaced the Dominion as the flagship train. In 1978, Via Rail took over all Canadian passenger trains, including the Canadian, which was the only train serving the station at that time. Passenger services to the station ended on January 15, 1990, when, due to budget cuts, the Canadian was rerouted on the Canadian National Railway main line through northern Alberta, serving Edmonton.

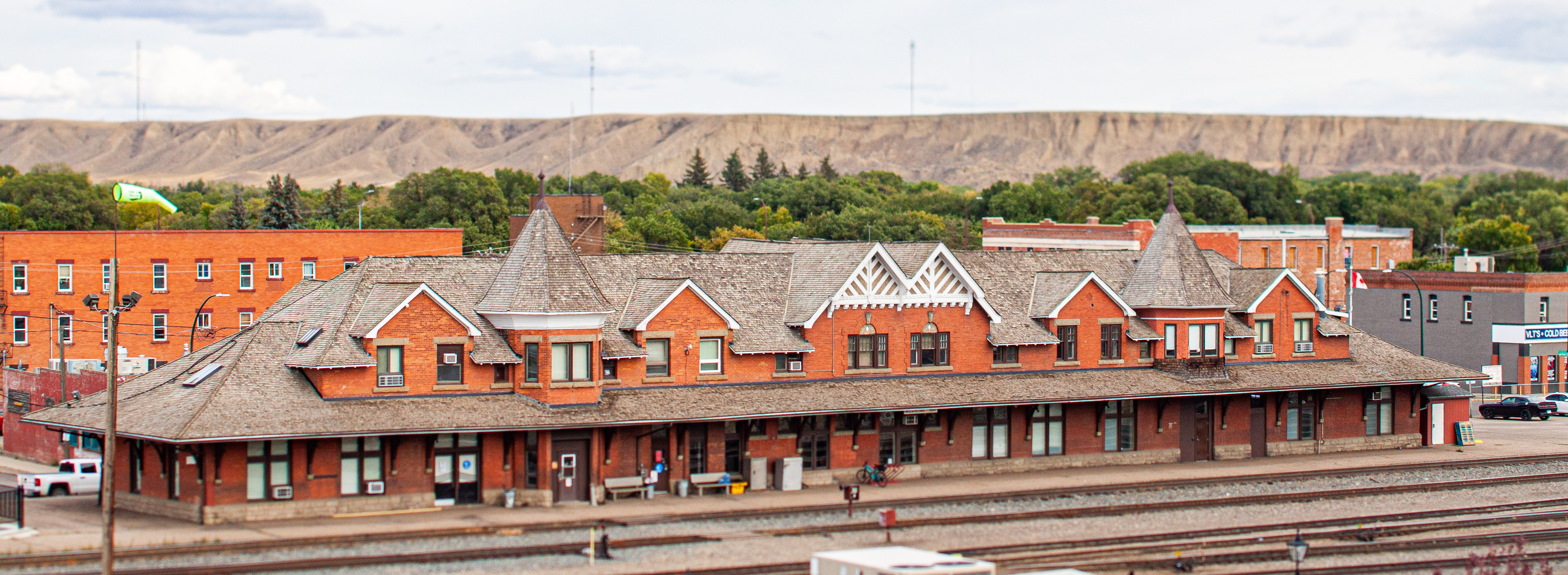
The station in 2021
