= Carleton Place station =

Railway station in Ontario, Canada

Carleton Place
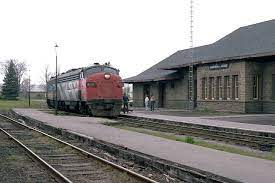

General information
- Location: 132 Coleman St, Carleton Place, ON K7C 4M7, Canada; Canada
- Owner: Town of Carleton Place
- Platforms: 1 side platform, 1 island platform
- Tracks: 2 (Formerly)

Construction
- Parking: Yes

History
- Opened: 1917
- Closed: 1989 (as a station)

Former services
| Preceding station | Via Rail | Following station |
|---|---|---|
| Almonte toward Vancouver | The Canadian | Ottawa toward Montreal |
| Preceding station | Canadian Pacific Railway | Following station |
| Renfrew toward Vancouver | Main Line | Ottawa toward Montreal Windsor |
| Almonte toward Chalk River | Chalk River – Ottawa | Ashton toward Ottawa |
| Beckwith toward Brockville | Brockville – Ottawa | Ashton toward Ottawa |
Location

The Canadian Pacific Railway (CPR) station in Carleton Place, Ontario, Canada, is a single-story train station that was built between 1921 and 1922 and currently stands at 110 Miguel Street. In 2007, it was listed in the Canadian Register of Historic Places. It is not in use as a train station anymore but is now the "Carleton Place Active Living Centre".
