= White River station =

Railway station in White River, Canada

White River
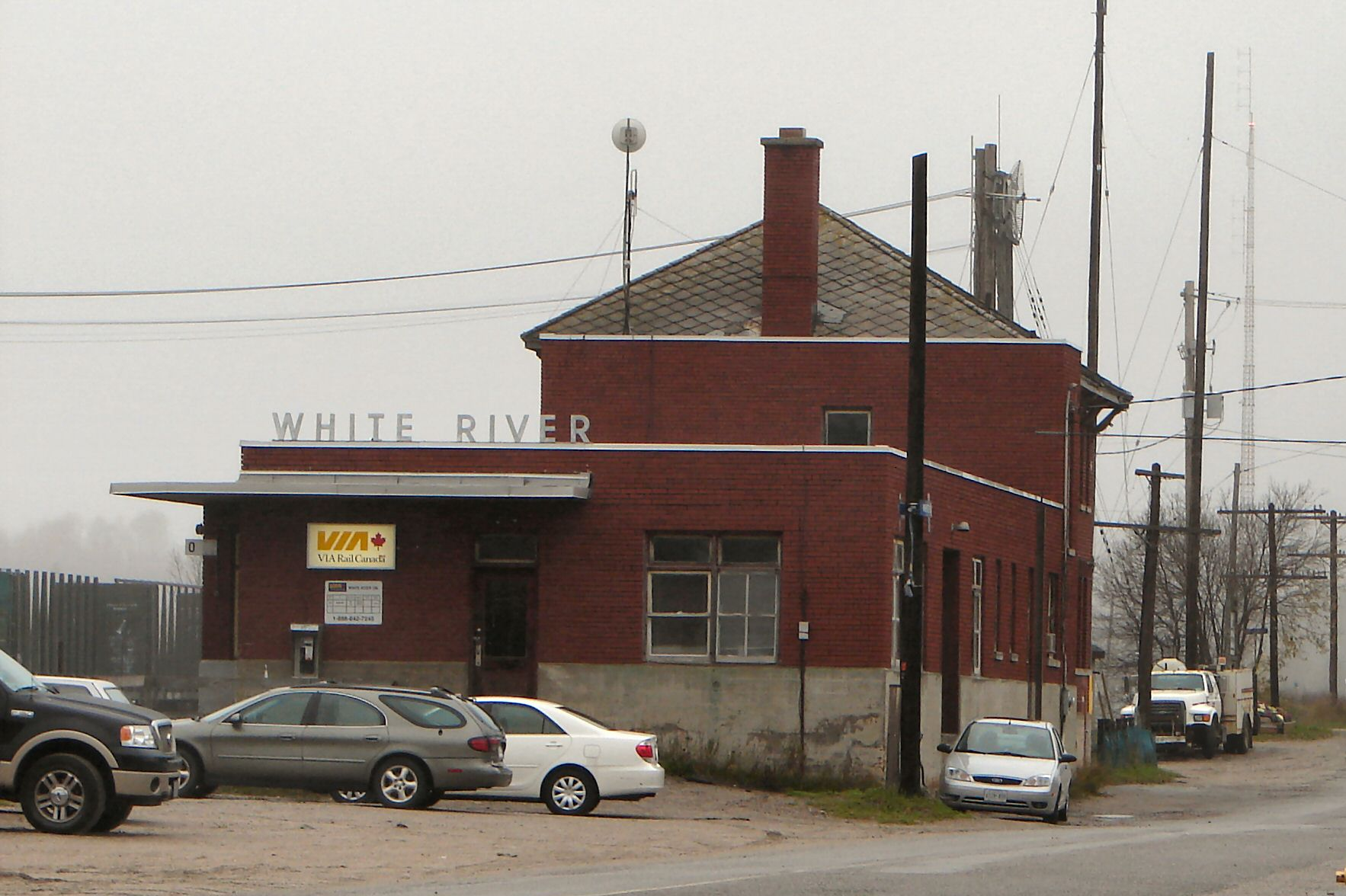

General information
- Location: Winnipeg St. North, White River, ON; Canada
- Coordinates: 48.58905°N 85.28232°W
- Owner: Via Rail
- Tracks: 1

Construction
- Structure type: Shelter

History
- Opened: 1886
- Rebuilt: 1907

Services
Preceding station	Via Rail	Following station
Terminus	Sudbury–White River	O'Brien toward Sudbury
Former services
Preceding station	Via Rail	Following station
Mobert toward Vancouver	The Canadian before 1990	Missanabie toward Toronto or Montreal
Preceding station	Canadian Pacific Railway	Following station
Regan toward Vancouver	Main Line	Amyot toward Montreal Windsor
Location
- Location within Ontario Location within Canada

White River station is a sheltered station located in the heart of White River. This station is the western terminus of Via Rail's Sudbury – White River train, and roughly midway between Sudbury and Thunder Bay.

The original station was built by the Canadian Pacific Railway in 1886 and enlarged in 1907.

== See also ==
- List of designated heritage railway stations of Canada
