= Heritage Railway Stations Protection Act =

Canadian act

Parliament of Canada
- Long title: An Act to protect heritage railway stations
- Citation: RSC 1985, c 52 (4th Supp)
- Enacted by: Parliament of Canada
- Royal assent: September 22, 1988
- Bill citation: C-205, 33rd Parliament, 2nd Session
- Introduced by: Gordon Taylor
- Status: Current legislation

The Heritage Railway Stations Protection Act (French: Loi sur la protection des gares ferroviaires patrimoniales) is an act of the Parliament of Canada. The Act was enacted in 1988 in response to a long-standing and widespread concern that Canada’s heritage railway stations were not being protected. Bill C-205, An Act to protect heritage railway stations, was proposed by MP Gordon Taylor in a private member's bill which received support of all parties in the House of Commons.

== Background ==
The railway was once the backbone of Canada. This changed with the widespread adoption of the automobile. The Trans-Canada Highway opened in 1962; Highway 2, the congested Main Street in every town in the busy Quebec City–Windsor Corridor, was bypassed by the 401/20 freeway in 1968. Passenger train ridership dropped from a World War II peak of 60 million to less than 5 million in 1977. Federally owned Via Rail provided CN and CP an exit from the long-unprofitable passenger rail business in 1978. The railways retained ownership of tracks, railway stations and freight operations. Less popular routes were gradually cut back.

The railways had little incentive to preserve or re-purpose abandoned passenger stations. Municipalities found provincial heritage preservation laws inadequate to protect railway history as interprovincial rail is within federal jurisdiction. CP's West Toronto station, closed when its last passenger train was rerouted in 1978, was unlawfully demolished on November 25, 1982 as one of multiple closed stations demolished in that era, occasionally using similar tactics.

== About the Act ==
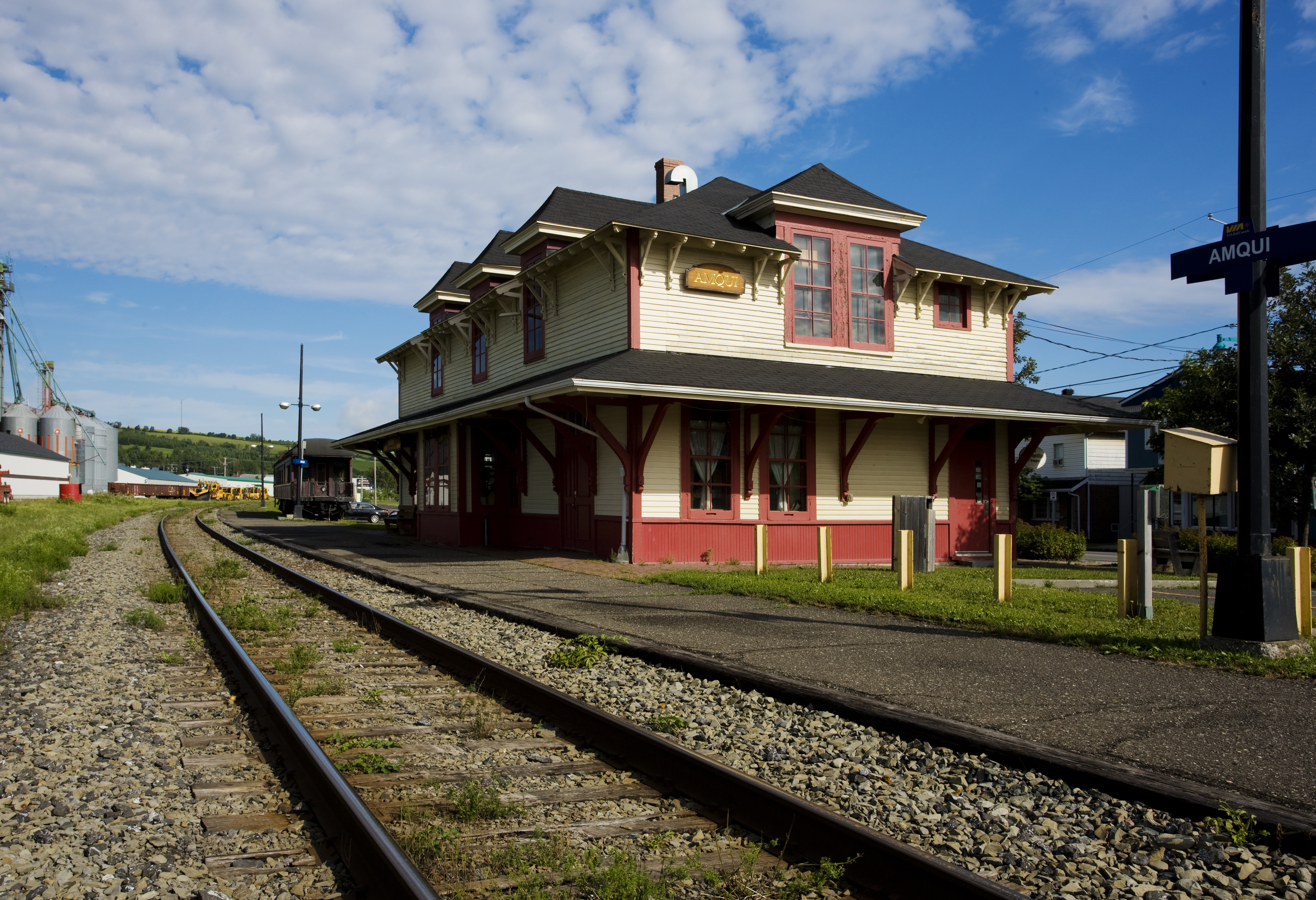
Built in 1904, the two-storey Amqui Train Station is protected under the Act

Designation of heritage railway stations and specific heritage features is made on the recommendation of the Historic Sites and Monuments Board of Canada by the minister responsible for Parks Canada. Requests to the Board, in turn, typically originate from local entities such as municipalities and historic preservation groups.

The protection of heritage railway stations applies to all railway companies under the Canada Transportation Act. No railway company may in any way alter, demolish, or transfer ownership of a designated heritage railway station without the authorization of the Government of Canada. There is a process in place through which any proposed changes can be reviewed and approved; public notice must be given to allow objections to be heard.

Violations of the Act are punishable by fines of not less than fifty thousand dollars and not more than one million dollars.

== Limitations ==
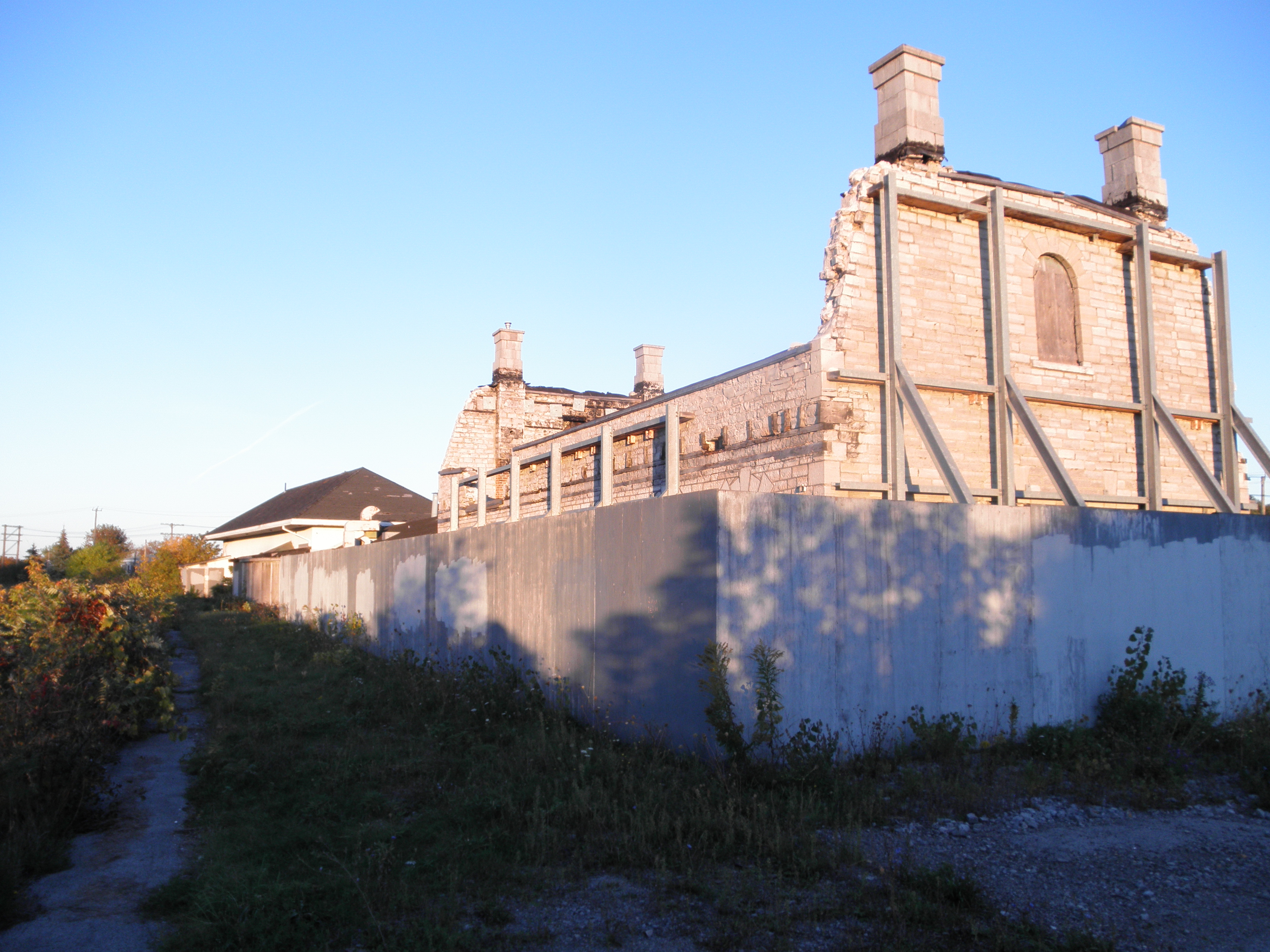
Though protected, the heritage railway station in Kingston, Ontario has been allowed to fall into ruins

Eligibility is limited to stations owned by federally licensed railway companies. A municipally owned station on an active rail line of federal importance (such as the 1856 Napanee railway station) therefore would not qualify regardless of historic notability or age. The protection ends when a historic station is sold.

The Act only protects railway stations; it does not extend to other historic railway structures, such as roundhouses.

The legislation also does nothing to require a railway to maintain a property to Heritage Canada guidelines or repair any damage, even as the structure declines to the point of violating municipal standards. By inaction, a railway can leave a historic structure in ruins. Kingston, Ontario mayor Mark Gerretsen has denounced this situation as a "loophole" as an 1856 Grand Trunk Railway station in that city is designated as being historic but "when CN lost its Crown corporation status they put in legislation that says if the building is ever sold the normal heritage act kicks in. Until it is sold, CN is not required to maintain it."

== See also ==
- List of designated heritage railway stations of Canada, for a list of stations which are or were protected under the act
- Heritage Lighthouse Protection Act, a federal act to designate and preserve historically significant Canadian lighthouses.
