= Quebec Gatineau Railway =

Short line railroad in the province of Québec, Canada

Chemins de fer Québec-Gatineau Inc.

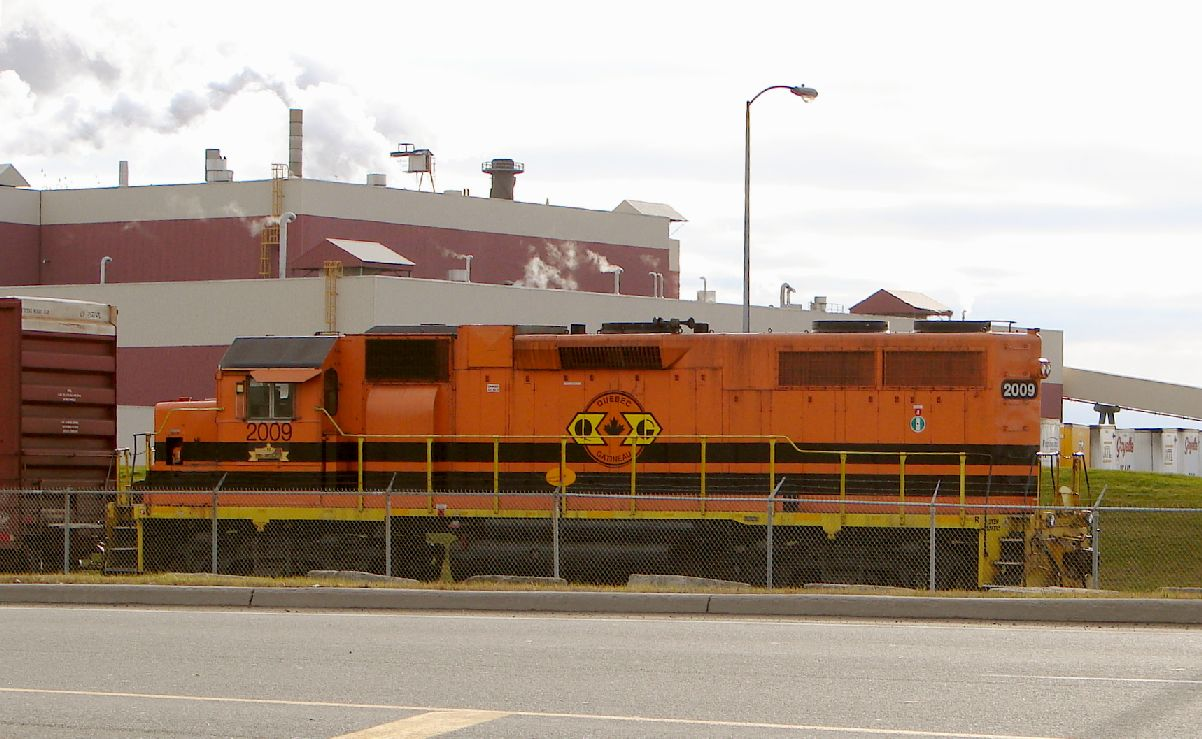
- QGRY locomotive with typical G&W livery in Gatineau

Overview
- Parent company: Genesee & Wyoming
- Headquarters: Boisbriand, Quebec
- Reporting mark: QGRY
- Locale: Quebec, Canada
- Dates of operation: 1997–
- Predecessor: Canadian Pacific Railway

Technical
- Track gauge: 4 ft 8 1/2 in (1,435 mm) standard gauge
- Length: 358 mi (576 km)

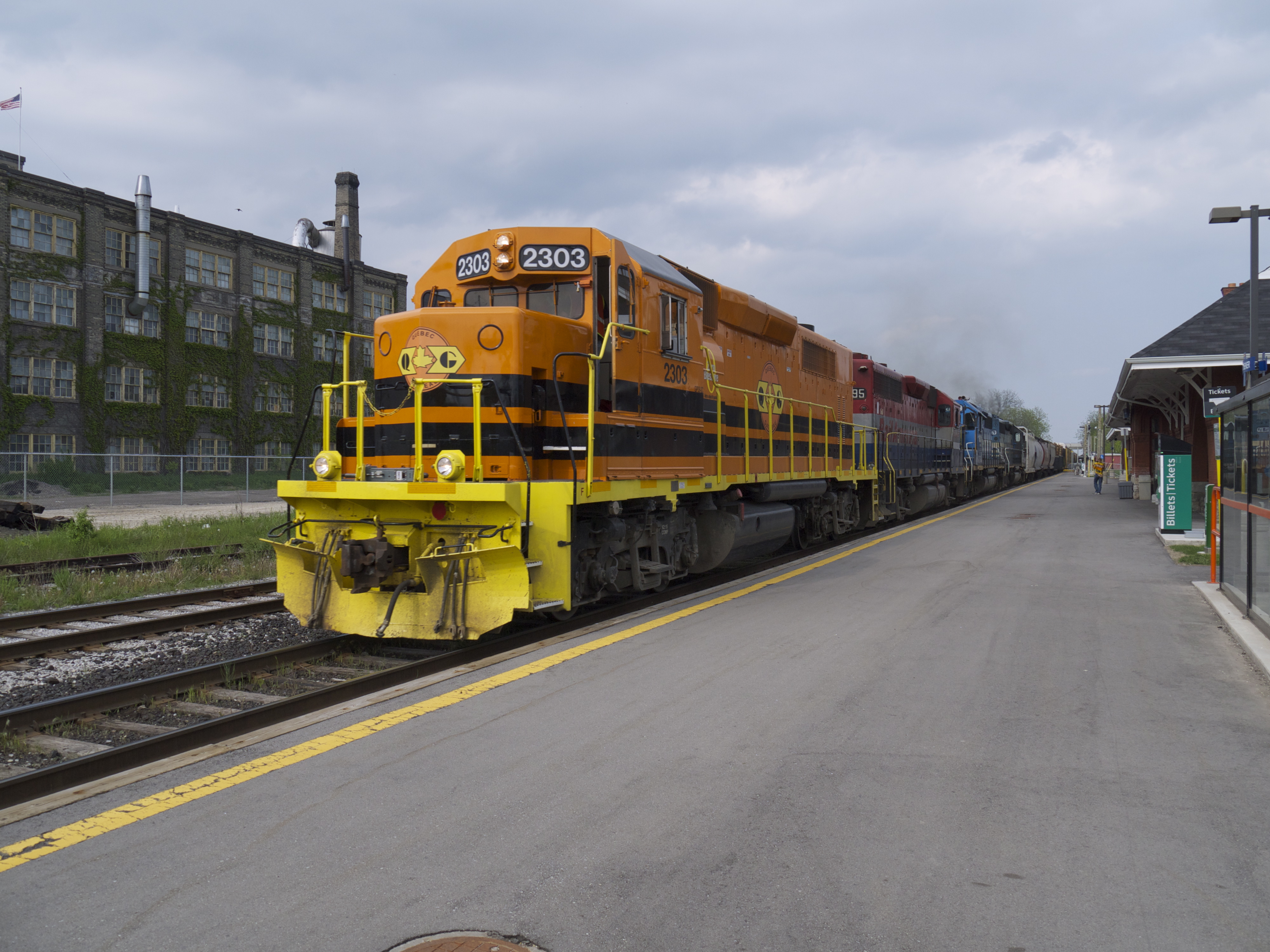
QGRY locomotive passing through Kitchener railway station

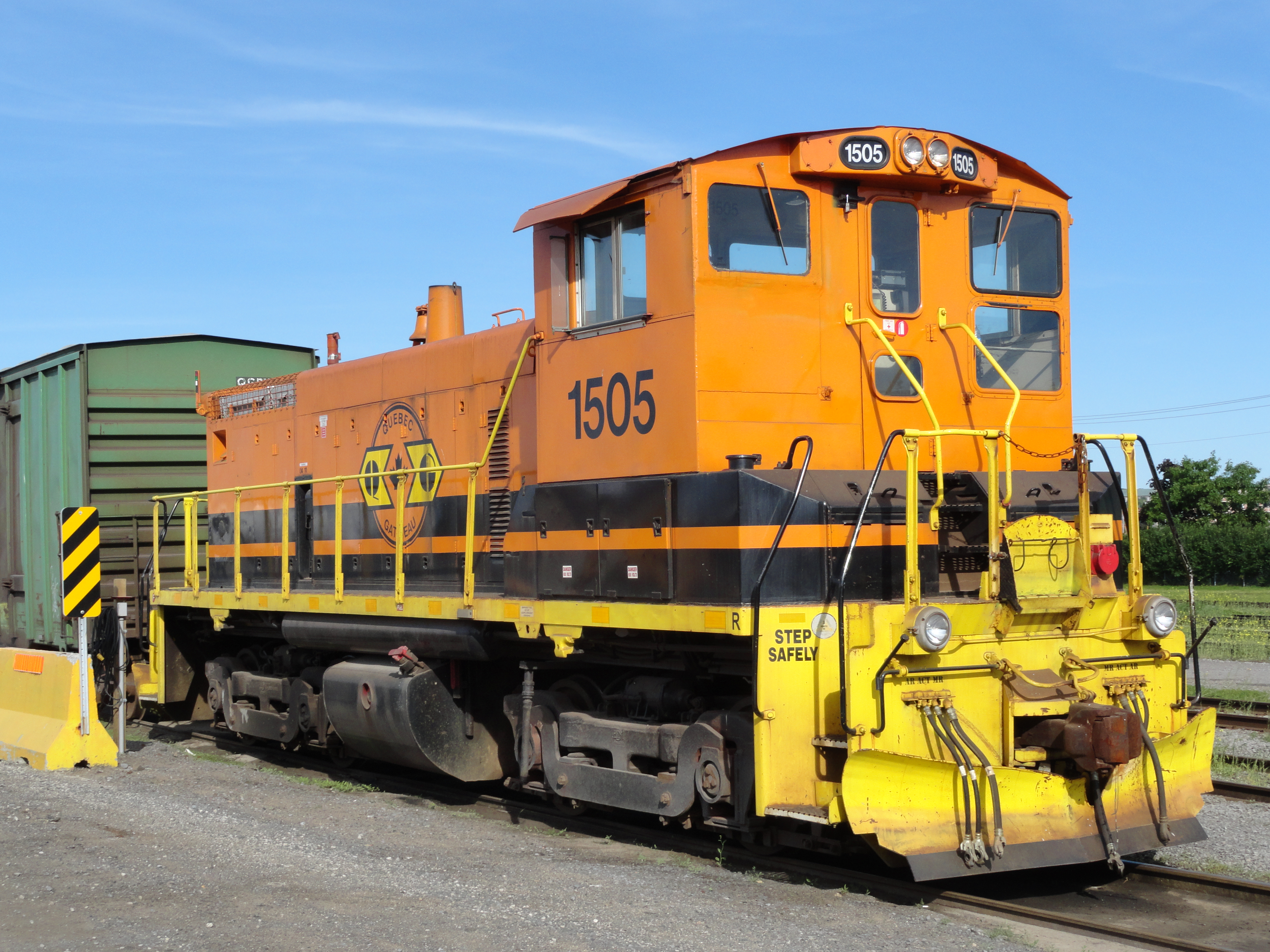
Quebec Gatineau Railway Locomotive (EMD SW1500)

Chemins de fer Québec-Gatineau Inc. (CFQG), in English the Quebec Gatineau Railway (reporting mark QGRY) is a shortline railway operating the 358 mi (576 km) long ex-Canadian Pacific Railway line between Quebec City, Trois-Rivières, Laval, Lachute and Gatineau, formerly Hull. It was formed in 1997 by Genesee & Wyoming Canada Inc., subsidiary of Genesee & Wyoming Inc.

== Trois-Rivières Subdivision ==
Defect detectors at 16.76, 32.4, 47.3, 62.1, 78.9, 101.6, 114.4, 131.7
Mile	Stations
155.8	Wolfe's Cove Spur, 3.1 mi (5.0 km) S.
152.9	Quebec City (Connection with CN)
152.4	Lorette
146.5	Bélair
134.3	Pont-Rouge
129.3	Saint-Basile
125.0	Portneuf
117.85	Crossing of CN La Tuque Sub.
117.5	La Chevrotière
107.2	La Pérade
95.1	Champlain
84.9	Cap-de-la-Madeleine Spur 2.2 mi (3.5 km) S.
83.3	Trois-Rivières Loop Spur
82.3	Trois-Rivières - Jct. Saint-Maurice Valley Sub.
81.3	Trois-Rivières Loop Spur
70.3	Devault
60.3	Lavoie
52.3	Saint-Barthelemy
44.0	Berthier Spur 2.1 mi (3.4 km) S.
35.7	Lanoraie - Saint-Gabriel Spur 8.4 mi (13.5 km) N.
23.29	Crossing with CN Joliette Sub
22.8	L'Épiphanie
17.8	Cabane Ronde
14.0	Mascouche
10.6	Terrebonne
0.0	Saint-Martin Jct - Jct. with CP Parc Sub

=== Saint-Gabriel Spur ===
Mile	Stations
0.0	Lanoraie
6.3	Joliette
7.11	Crossing of CN Joliette Sub.
8.0	End of track (?)
8.0	Connection (?) Chemin de fer Lanaudière

== Saint-Maurice Valley Subdivision ==
Mile	Stations
0.0	Trois-Rivières
1.6	Jct Trois-Rivières Sub.
21.7	Shawinigan
23.73	Connection to CN
27.9	Grand-Mère

== Lachute Subdivision ==
Formerly the Canadian Pacific Railway's Ellwood Subdivision.

Defect detector 109.7
Mile	Stations
28.0	Saint-Augustin - Former CN connection was lifted when the CN sold the Deux-Montagnes line to the AMT.
32.9	Montfort Jct - Jct Monfort Sub.
44.1	Lachute
55.2	Marelan
74.5	Montebello
90.6	Thurso
99.9	Buckingham Jct (Masson) - Jct Buckingham Spur
111.9	Gatineau
116.4	Laman - Jct HCW (Chemin de fer de l'Outaouais), abandoned
118.6	Hull
119.3	Île Lemieux, repurposed as bike trail
119.3	Chief William Commanda Bridge, repurposes as bike trail
119.3	Possible future connection to Bytown and Prescott Railway, Ottawa Central Railway, O-Train Line 2, or Letsgomoose

=== Buckingham Spur ===
Mile	Stations
0.0	Buckingham Jct (Masson) - Jct Lachute Sub.
1.7	Murphy
3.2	Buckingham

=== Montfort Subdivision ===
Mile	Stations
23.1	
24.6	Belle-Rivière - Connection to Lachute Sub
34.3	Carbo
34.4	Carbo Spur, 1.0 mi (1.6 km) E.
36.4	Rinfret - Connection to AMT (former CPR line) 1.0 mi (1.6 km) E
39.4	Saint-Jérôme - Saint-Jérôme Spur, 3.0 mi (4.8 km) N.

== See also ==
- Lemieux Island
- Chief William Commanda Bridge
