= Casselman, Ontario =

Casselman
- Municipality (lower-tier)
- Municipality of Casselman; Municipalité de Casselman
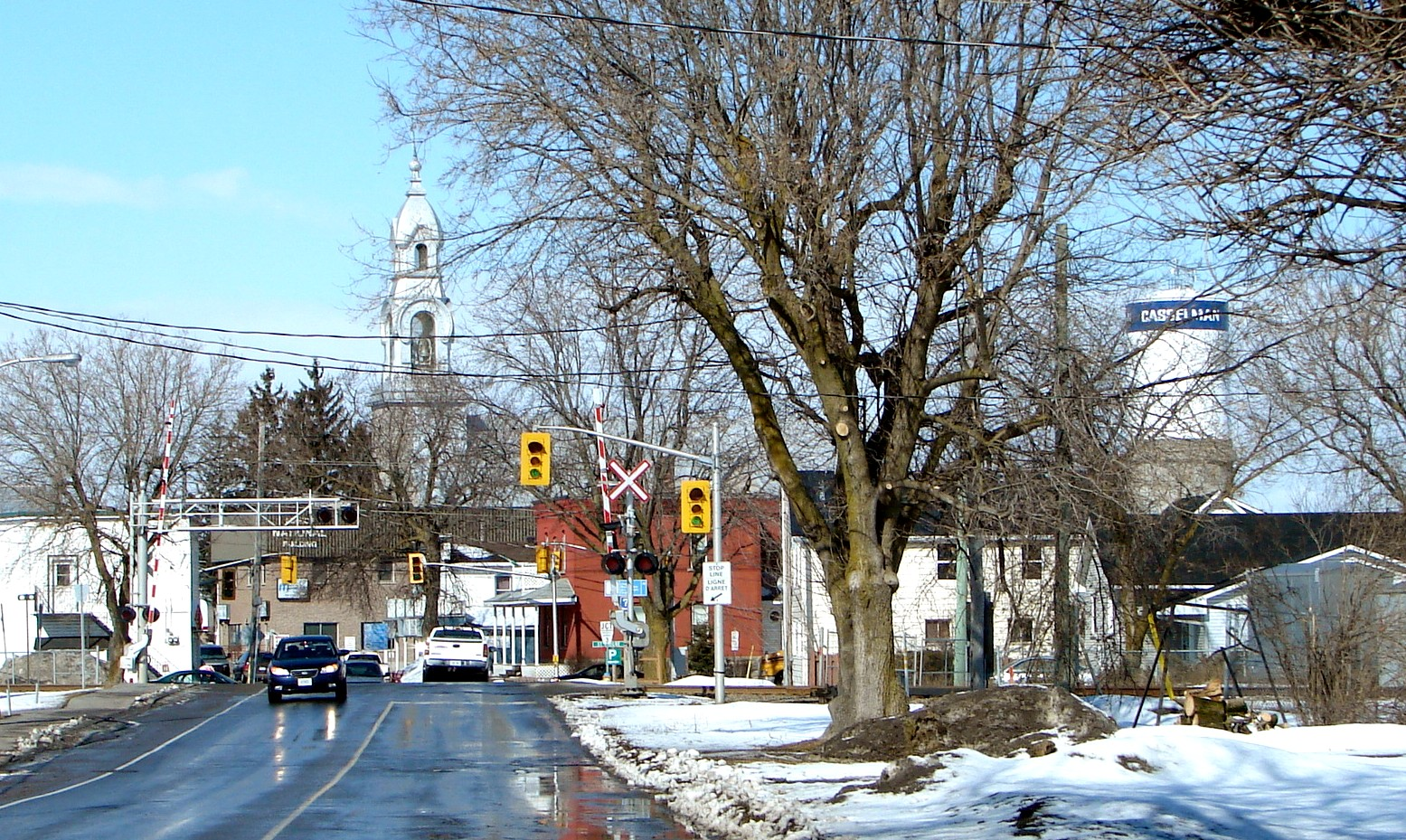

- Location within United Counties of Prescott and Russell Location within Southern Ontario
- Coordinates: 45°18′30″N 75°05′00″W
- Country: Canada
- Province: Ontario
- County: Prescott and Russell
- Settled: 1844
- Incorporated: June 11, 1888

Government
  - Mayor: Genevieve Lajoie
  - MP: Giovanna Mingarelli
  - MPP: Stéphane Sarrazin

Area
  - Land: 5.13 km^{2} (1.98 sq mi)

Population (2021)
  - Total: 3,960
  - Density: 772.2/km^{2} (2,000/sq mi)
- Time zone: UTC−5 (EST)
  - Summer (DST): UTC−4 (EDT)
- Postal Code: K0A 1M0
- Area code: 613
- Website: www.casselman.ca

Casselman is a municipality in eastern Ontario, Canada, in the United Counties of Prescott and Russell. Situated on the South Nation River about 55 km (34 mi) southeast of downtown Ottawa, along the Trans-Canada Highway 417.

Casselman is an enclave within the Municipality of The Nation, since Casselman citizens refused to join the fusion of municipalities in 1998. The village was named after Martin Casselman who built a sawmill near the site of the current town in 1844.

It is served by the Casselman railway station on the Montreal–Ottawa Via Rail train, twice a day in each direction.

Casselman hosted L'écho d'un peuple, at Ferme Drouin, one of the biggest shows ever presented in Ontario, until the organization ran into financial trouble in 2008.

== History ==
Casselman was founded by Martin Major Casselman (1805–1881), son of a Loyalist family who had bought large tracts of land in Cambridge Township (now part The Nation) in order to develop his timber trade. He obtained another 650 hectares (1,600 acres) on both sides of the South Nation River at the current location of the village, where he settled in 1844 and built a dam and sawmill. Settlement by French Canadians and Catholics followed after 1849, when Bishop Guigues founded a colonization society to encourage settlement in the region.

Its post office was established in 1857. That same year, the Township of Cambridge was incorporated, and Martin Casselman became its first reeve, and also served as the postmaster from 1871 to 1881.

In 1881, the railroad connecting Casselman to Coteau Junction was completed, and the next year, it was extended to Ottawa. In 1885, there were about 200 families, and a Catholic chapel was built. On June 11, 1888, Casselman separated from Cambridge Township and was incorporated as a village municipality. It had 750 inhabitants at that time.

In July 1891, the village partially burnt down, and 6 years later in October 1897, it was entirely destroyed in a wildfire. And again in July 1919, another fire destroyed most of the buildings on the main street.

The village installed modern water and sewer services that became operational in 1977.

Casselman changed its status from a village to a municipality on July 9, 2019.

== Demographics ==
In the 2021 Census of Population conducted by Statistics Canada, Casselman had a population of 3,960 living in 1,578 of its 1,630 total private dwellings, a change of 11.6% from its 2016 population of 3,548. With a land area of 5.13 km^{2} (1.98 sq mi), it had a population density of 771.9/km^{2} (1,999.3/sq mi) in 2021.

Canada census – Casselman, Ontario community profile

	2021	2016
Population	3,960 (+11.6% from 2016)	3,548 (-2.2% from 2011)
Land area	5.13 km^{2} (1.98 sq mi)	5.12 km^{2} (1.98 sq mi)
Population density	772.2/km^{2} (2,000/sq mi)	693.4/km^{2} (1,796/sq mi)
Median age	43.6 (M: 40.8, F: 46.4)	44.0 (M: 42.0, F: 45.7)
Private dwellings	1,630 (total) 1,578 (occupied)	1,480 (total) 1,435 (occupied)
Median household income	$99,000	$83,014

References: 2021 2016

Historical census populations – Casselman, Ontario

Year	Pop.	±%
1901	707	—
1911	956	+35.2%
1921	977	+2.2%
1931	995	+1.8%
1941	1,021	+2.6%
1951	1,158	+13.4%
1956	1,241	+7.2%

Year	Pop.	±%
1961	1,277	+2.9%
1966	1,227	−3.9%
1971	1,337	+9.0%
1976	1,422	+6.4%
1981	1,675	+17.8%
1986	1,875	+11.9%
1991	2,434	+29.8%

Year	Pop.	±%
1996	2,877	+18.2%
2001	2,910	+1.1%
2006	3,275	+12.5%
2011	3,626	+10.7%
2016	3,548	−2.2%
2021	3,960	+11.6%

Source: Statistics Canada

=== Language ===
Canada Census Mother Tongue - Casselman, Ontario
Census	Total	English			French			English & French			Other		
Year	Responses	Count	Trend	Pop %	Count	Trend	Pop %	Count	Trend	Pop %	Count	Trend	Pop %
2021	3,925	845	▲38.5%	21.5%	2,800	▲1.1%	71.3%	145	▲123.1%	3.7%	115	▲130.0%	2.9%
2016	3,500	610	▲3.4%	17.4%	2,770	▼1.2%	79.1%	65	▲18.2%	1.9%	50	▲25.0%	1.4%
2011	3,500	590	▲21.6%	16.9%	2,805	▲6.0%	80.1%	55	▲57.1%	1.6%	40	▲166.7%	1.1%
2006	3,175	485	▲40.6%	15.3%	2,645	▲6.4%	83.3%	35	0.0%	1.1%	15	▲50.0%	0.5%
2001	2,870	345	▼12.7%	12.0%	2,485	▲7.1%	86.6%	35	▲40.0%	1.2%	10	▲ n/a%	0.3%
1996	2,750	395	n/a	14.4%	2,320	n/a	84.4%	25	n/a	0.9%	0	n/a	0.0%

== See also ==
- Transit Eastern Ontario operates under the authority of The North Glengarry Prescott Russell (NGPR) Transport Board
- List of francophone communities in Ontario
