= Greber Plan =

1950 urban plan for Ottawa, Ontario, Canada

The General Report on the Plan for the National Capital (1946–1950), or Gréber Plan, was a major urban plan developed for Canada's National Capital Region in 1950 by Jacques Gréber, commissioned by the Federal District Commission of Ottawa, Ontario.

The report was ordered by William Lyon Mackenzie King at the end of the Second World War and was used as the model for the development of the National Capital Region for more than 50 years. Parts of Gréber’s Plan were made into reality, and have since contributed to some of Ottawa’s most iconic areas: the landscaping and plaza surrounding the National War Memorial, the design of Major's Hill Park and Confederation Park, and the reorganization of traffic in the city center.

In February 2019, Ottawa mayor Jim Watson began the process to develop a modern version of the Gréber Plan.

== Main components ==
The report's main components and recommendations were:

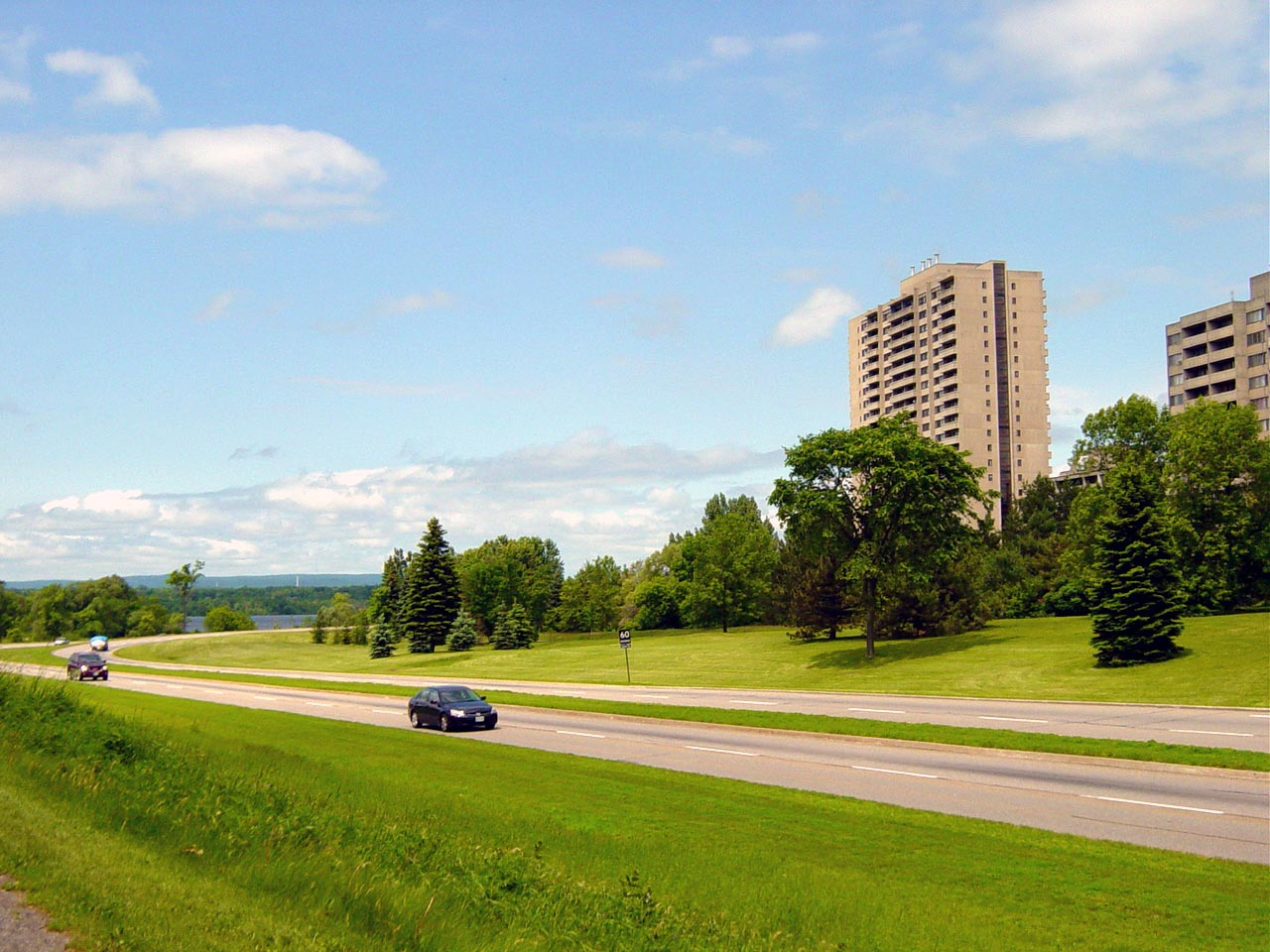
Kichi Zibi Mikan (former Macdonald Parkway)

- relocating the rails from central Ottawa to create scenic parkways
  - Originally on the outskirts of the city, the railways had been constructed without regard for future urban expansion. Their removal would eliminate rail barriers that divided neighbourhoods, improve safety, and speed traffic circulation. The decision was made to relocate the downtown rail yards to Walkley Road, drastically reducing the number of trains coming into the city’s core. The Federal District Commission (FDC) arranged a land exchange with both the Canadian National Railway and the Canadian Pacific Railway, giving them the land for their freight yards, while the FDC would then get all of the railway right-of-ways through Ottawa. Upon the transfer of land, 22 acres (89,000 m^{2}) of prime downtown land became available.
  - Replacing the railways would be a network of highways, urban arteries, and tree-lined parkways. Gréber recommended the construction of two new bridges across the Ottawa River on the outskirts of the city that would link the Ontario and Quebec highway systems, one in the west over Nepean Bay at Lemieux Island, and another in the east over Upper Duck Island.
- decentralizing federal government office complexes
  - Many of the buildings used for government offices in post-war Ottawa were temporary structures that were never intended to be permanent. After discussion, some government departments remained close to Parliament Hill, while others, including many administrative and research facilities were moved to more suburban areas such as Tunney's Pasture. The temporary buildings were demolished once the new buildings were complete.

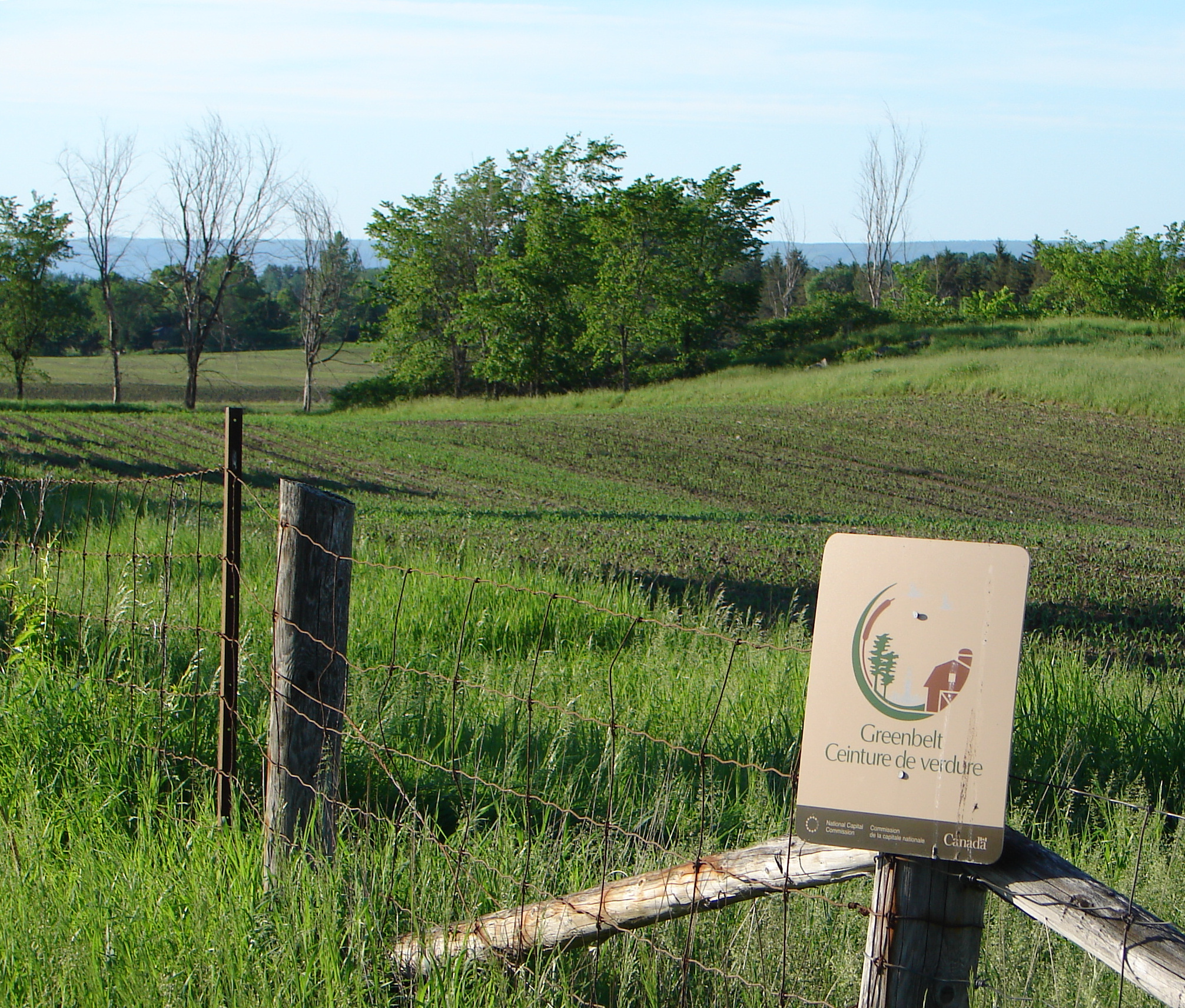
National Capital Greenbelt

- creating a green belt—what would become the National Capital Greenbelt
  - Gréber’s Greenbelt project was designed to serve one main purpose reason: to keep the city contained and prevent urban sprawl.
- extending the existing parkway networks

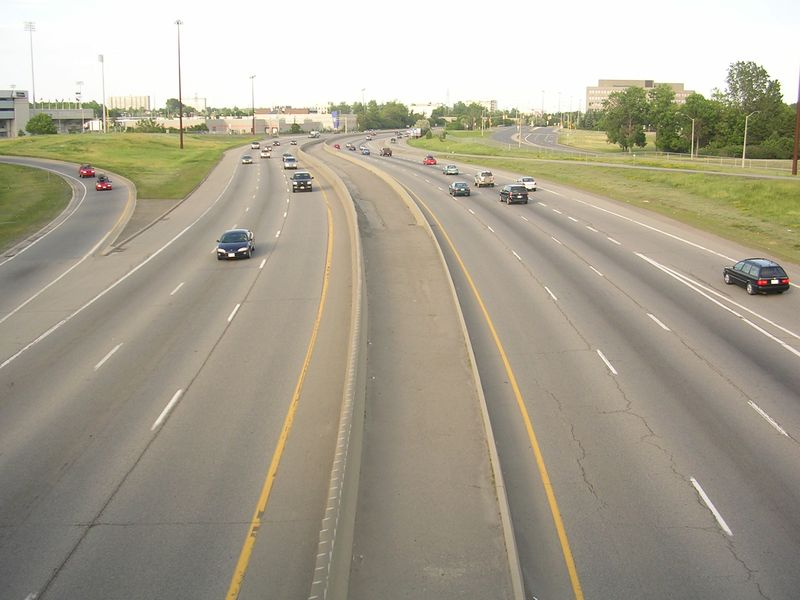
The Queensway

  - In order to accommodate the influx of traffic into the city, a highway—what would become Ottawa's Queensway—was built using the right-of-ways for the CN rail lines.
- expanding and improving Gatineau Park (formed in 1938)
- restoring waterfront lands and preservation of nature
  - This included improving the shorelines along the Ottawa River and returning Chaudiere Falls and the surrounding islands to their natural state, as well as de-industrializing the islands.
- construction of monumental buildings in downtown
  - Gréber recommended the construction of a number of large monumental buildings, including the establishment of a National Theatre on Elgin Street, a National Gallery on Cartier Square, and a National Library on Sussex Street (now Sussex Drive).
- planning the region as an integrated system
- making the Capital symbolize the whole country

== History ==
Ottawa was chosen as the national capital of Canada by Queen Victoria in 1857. At that time, the town was a small lumber and military centre with a population of over 10,000 people. While a site for the new Parliament Buildings was selected on what was then Barracks Hill (later Parliament Hill), little formal planning was undertaken for the rest of the city. The city was lacking in utilities common to other cities in the era. There were no paved streets, sewers, gaslights or piped water supply.

In 1893, Prime Minister Sir Wilfrid Laurier promised "to make the city of Ottawa as attractive as possibly could be; to make it the centre of the intellectual development of this country and above all the Washington of the north." Following Laurier's initiative four successive city plans were proposed, although for various reasons none were successfully implemented.

During World War II, most of the downtown Ottawa's green spaces was filled with "temporary" wooden office buildings hastily constructed to house the Capital’s burgeoning civil service. The city’s natural beauty was also threatened with unplanned urban sprawl, while its waterways were fouled by the detritus of the area’s extensive wood-products industry and the untreated sewage of its growing population. At the time, the Government of Canada was entertaining the idea of creating a federal district like Washington, D.C.

In 1936, Prime Minister William Lyon Mackenzie King invited Jacques Gréber, a French town planner, to act as an advisor for planning in Ottawa. A couple of years later, in 1938, Gréber was commissioned by Mackenzie King and the Federal District Commission to develop a vision and urban plan for the National Capital Region. However, war broke out before much could be achieved beyond the construction of the National War Memorial.

Following the War, the report was again ordered by Mackenzie King in 1946. As Gréber never actually came to Ottawa at the time, Public Works Canada was tasked with photographing almost all of the intersections in downtown Ottawa in order to provide Gréber with a sense of the atmosphere and feel of Ottawa.

Gréber published his 300-page "General Report on the Plan for the National Capital" on 18 November 1949, recommending large-scale networks that would alter the face of the national capital. Mackenzie King, who had retired as prime minister the previous year, wrote the foreword to the report. (MacKenzie King passed away two years before the final report was submitted, however.) In 1958, Parliament passed the National Capital Act, establishing the National Capital Region and a new National Capital Commission (NCC) to bring Gréber's plan into reality. The Gréber Report would serve as the NCC's planning guide into the 1970s. Gréber writes, "the restoration of the Chaudiere Islands to their primitive beauty and wildness, is perhaps the theme of greatest importance, from the aesthetic point of view-the theme that will appeal, not only to local citizens, but to all Canadians who take pride in their country and its institutions."

In February 2019, Ottawa mayor Jim Watson began the process to develop a modern version of the Gréber Plan, a 25-year plan for the city, anticipating breaching a population of 1 million residents, and foreseeing a part of a megaregion to also encompass Toronto and Montreal.
