= Alexandria station (Ontario) =

Railway station in Ontario, Canada

Alexandria
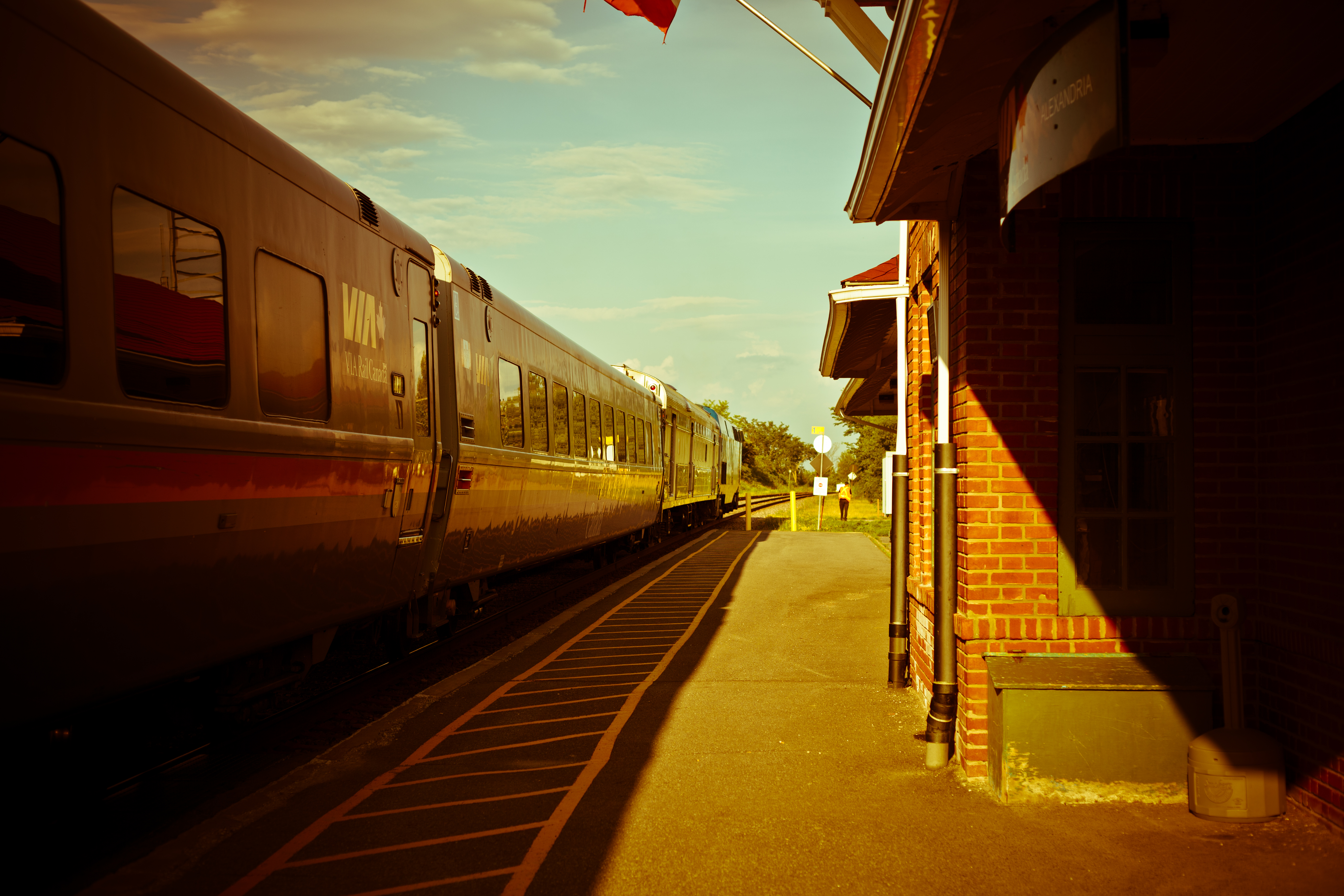
- A Corridor train at Alexandria in 2011.

General information
- Location: 45 McDougald Street E. Alexandria, ON; Canada
- Coordinates: 45°19′05″N 74°38′23″W
- Platforms: 1 side platform
- Tracks: 2

Construction
- Structure type: Unstaffed station
- Parking: 15 spaces

Other information
- Station code: ALEX
- Website: Alexandria station

History
- Opened: 1917

Services
Preceding station	Via Rail	Following station
Casselman toward Ottawa or Fallowfield	Ottawa–Montreal	Coteau toward Montreal
Casselman toward Ottawa	Ottawa–Québec City	Coteau toward Quebec City
Former services
Preceding station	Canadian National Railway	Following station
Greenfield toward Vancouver	Main Line	Glen Robertson toward Montreal

Heritage Railway Station (Canada)
- Designated: 1994

Ontario Heritage Act
- Official name: VIA Rail/Canadian National Railways Station
- Designated: 11 March 2008
- Reference no.: 4620
Location
- Location within Southern Ontario Location within Ontario Location within Canada

Alexandria Station is a train station in Alexandria, Ontario, Canada. Located on McDougal Street, it is an intermediate stop for all trains on the Via Rail Ottawa–Montreal line. The station is unstaffed, has a wheelchair accessible shelter and fifteen outdoor parking spaces. In 1994, it became a Designated Heritage Railway Station.

== Railway services ==
As of July 2025, Alexandria station is served by 4 to 5 trains per day in each direction between Ottawa and Montreal.

== See also ==
- List of designated heritage railway stations of Canada
