= Casselman station =

Railway station in Ontario, Canada

Casselman
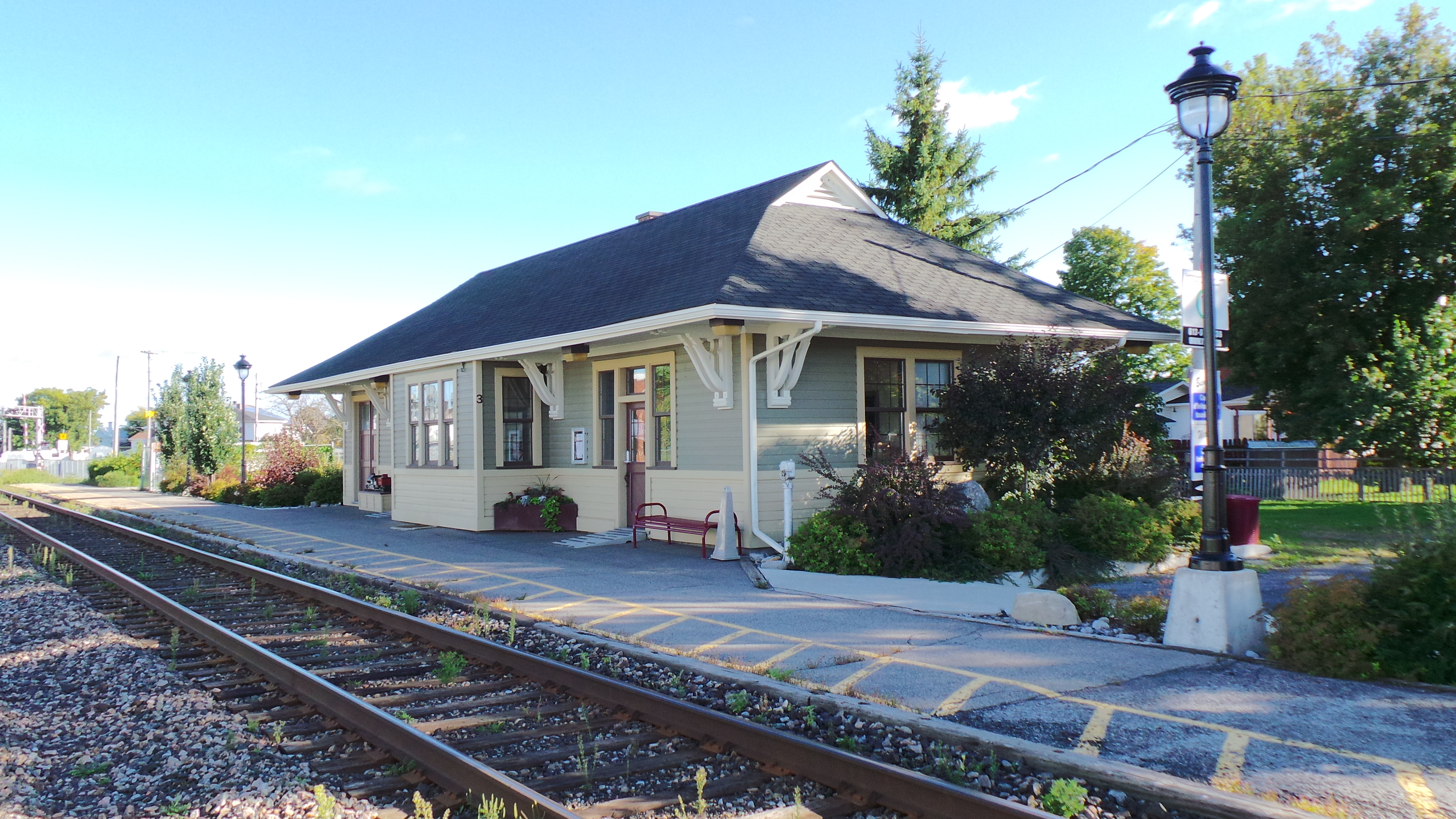
- The station in 2013.

General information
- Location: 3 Station Street; Casselman, Ontario; Canada
- Coordinates: 45.3123°N 75.0873°W
- Owner: Via Rail
- Platforms: 1 side platform
- Tracks: 1

Construction
- Structure type: Unstaffed station
- Parking: 8 spaces
- Accessible: Yes

Other information
- Website: Casselman train station

History
- Opened: 1939

Services
| Preceding station | Via Rail | Following station |
|---|---|---|
| Ottawa toward Ottawa or Fallowfield | Ottawa–Montreal | Alexandria toward Montreal |
| Ottawa Terminus | Ottawa–Québec City | Alexandria toward Quebec City |
Former services
| Preceding station | Canadian National Railway | Following station |
|---|---|---|
| Limoges toward Vancouver | Main Line | Moose Creek toward Montreal |
Location
- Location within Southern Ontario Location within Ontario Location within Canada

Casselman railway station is located on St. Joseph Street in the village of Casselman, Ontario, Canada. It is an optional station stop on the Via Rail Toronto-Ottawa-Montreal Corridor line for two trains a day in each direction. Both westbound trains arrive from Montreal and continue towards Ottawa, Kingston, and Toronto. The first eastbound train arrives from Toronto, Kingston, and Ottawa and continues towards Montreal, while the second eastbound train arrives from Ottawa only and continues to Montreal.

The station is wheelchair accessible.

The station is also the local tourist information center and contains the Casselman Historical Museum.

== History ==
It is small, one-storey, wood built railway station built between 1938-39. It consists of a low, rectangular block with shallow, projecting bays on the north and south facades, contained under a slightly bell-cast and gablet roof. Inside is a general waiting room, an office area with telegrapher’s bay, ticket wicket and washrooms, the ladies’ waiting room and the baggage room.

== Railway services ==
As of July 2025, Casselman station is served by 2 to 3 trains per day in each direction between Ottawa and Montreal.

== See also ==
- List of designated heritage railway stations of Canada
