= Lemieux Island =

Island of Ottawa, Canada

Coordinates: 45.41523°N 75.72919°W

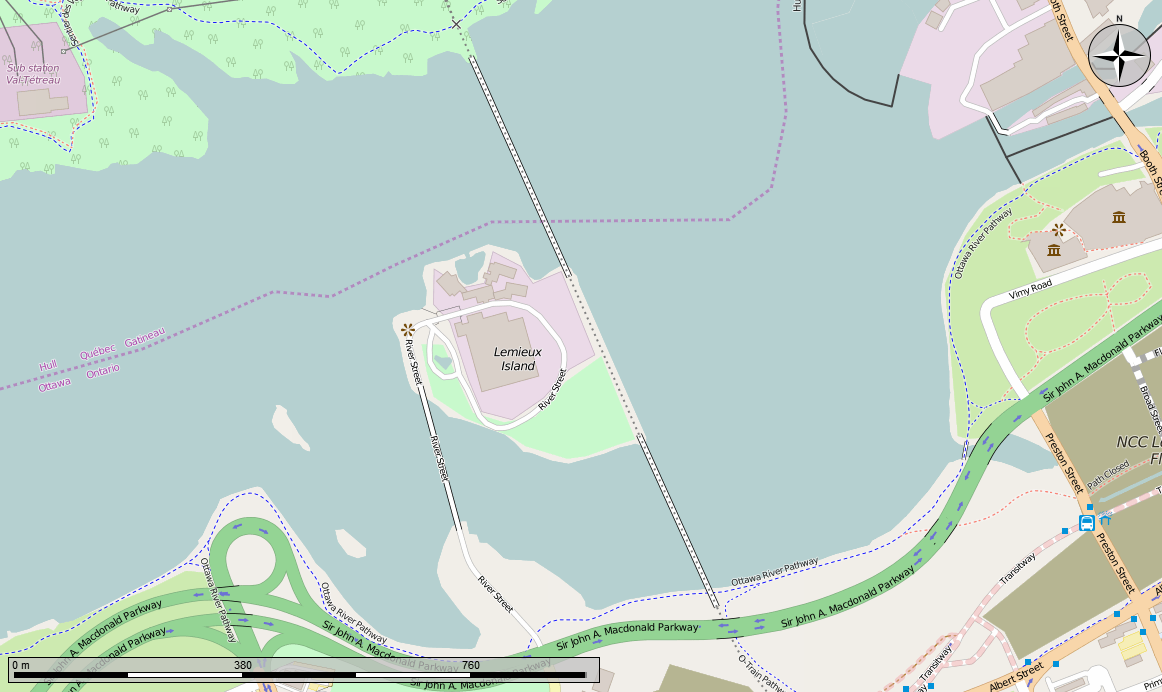
Map of the island. Ottawa is at the bottom, Hull at the top.

Lemieux Island (French: Île Lemieux) is a small island in the middle of the Ottawa River at the edge of Nepean Bay in the National Capital Region of Canada. The island lies between Gatineau, Quebec, and the national capital, Ottawa, Ontario. Administratively being a part of the latter, it is crossed by the Chief William Commanda Bridge and is the site of a water filtration plant operated by the City of Ottawa.

The island also features a dog park.

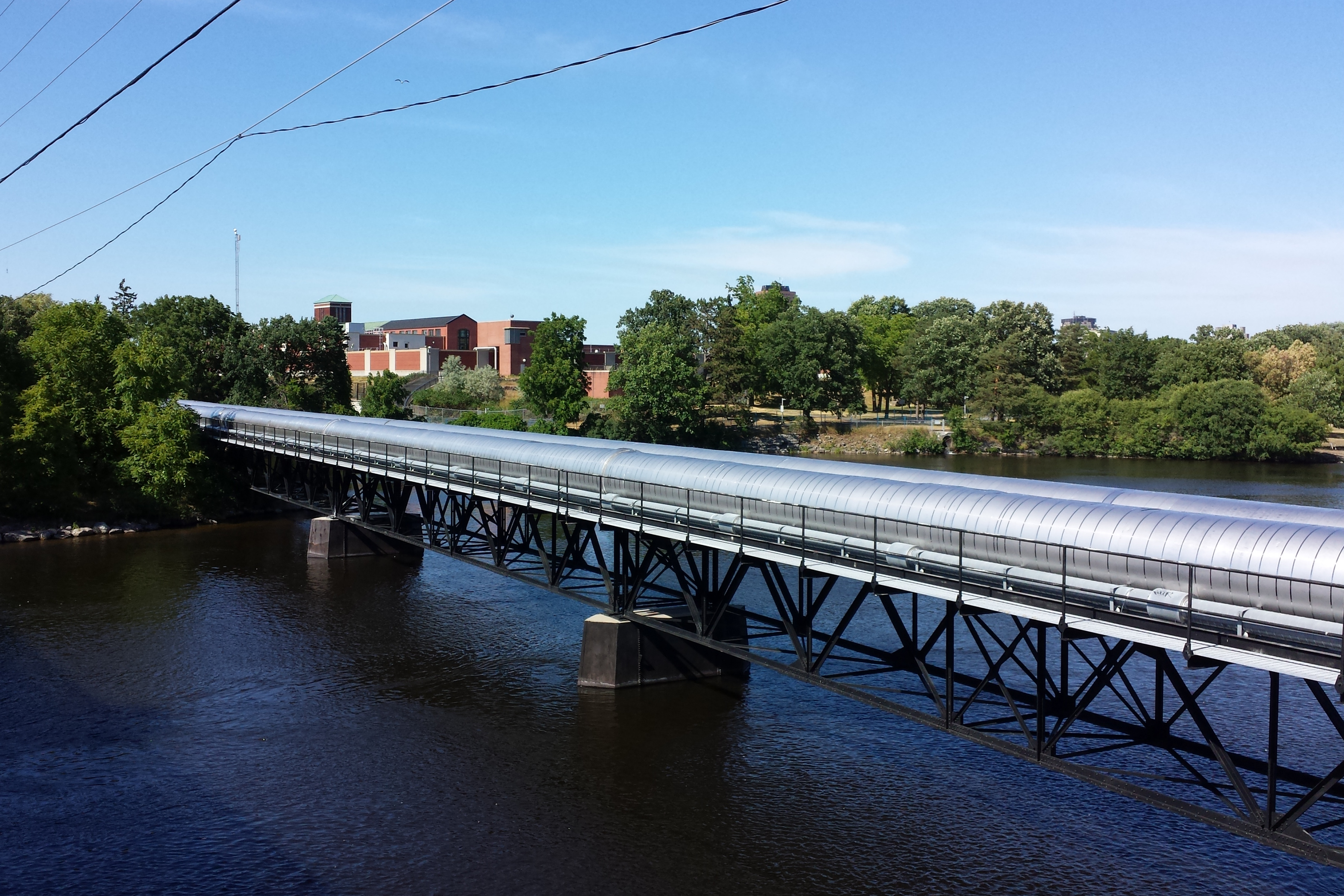
Lemieux Island and the water supply pipe

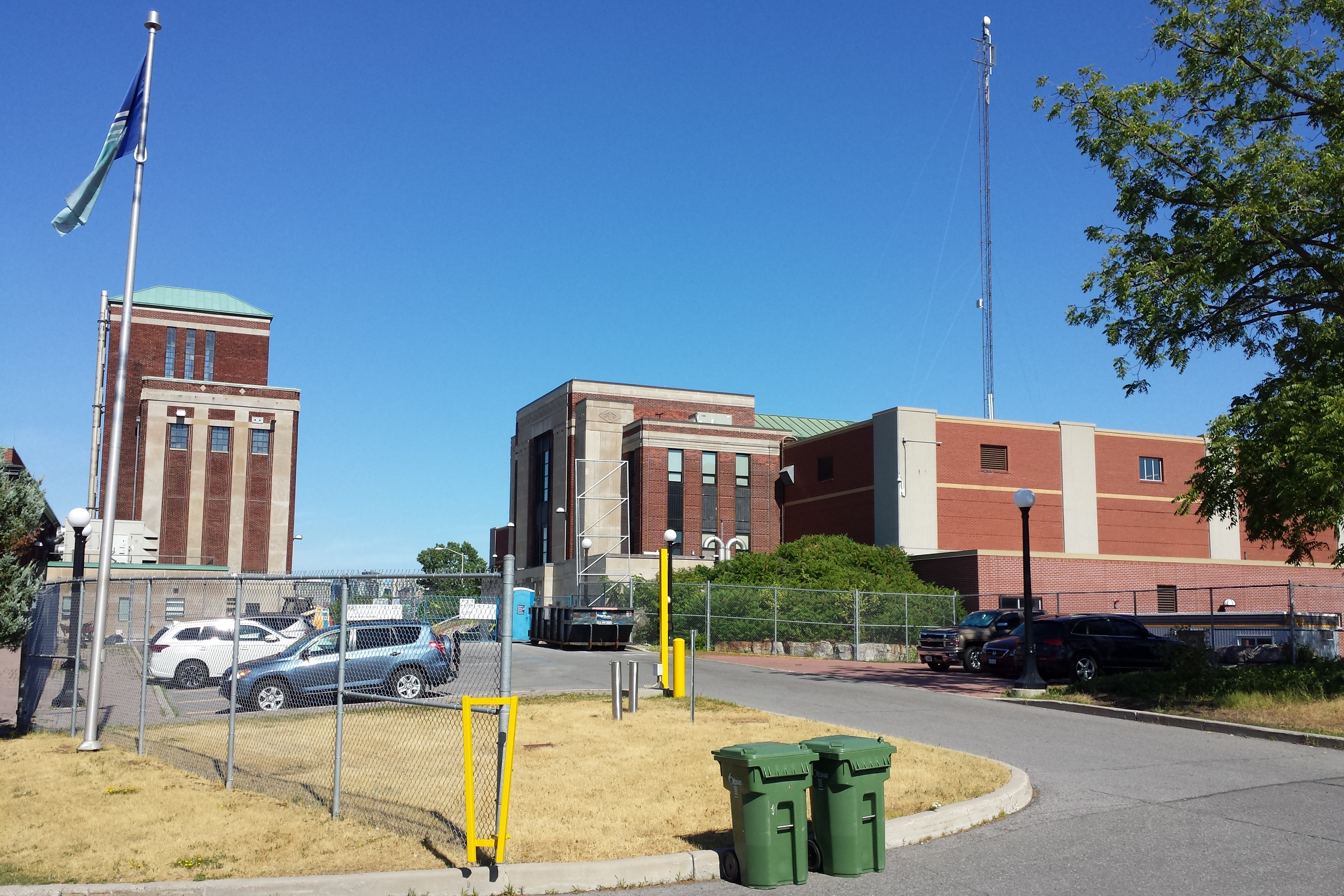
Lemieux Island Water Purification Plant

== See also ==
- Letsgomoose
- Quebec Gatineau Railway
