= Chief William Commanda Bridge =

Bridge spanning the Ottawa River, Canada

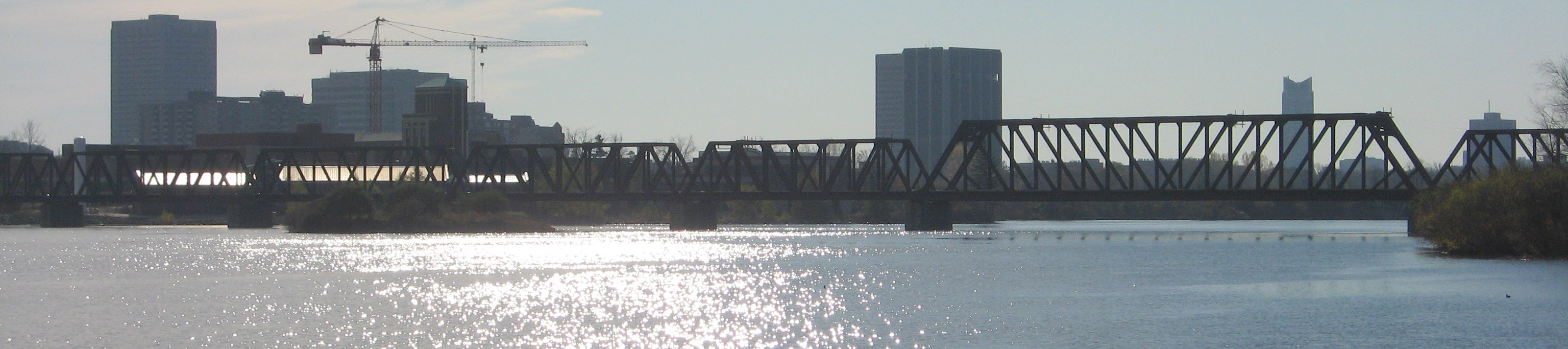
- Looking west to the Chief William Commanda Bridge
- Coordinates: 45°24′56″N 75°43′40″W
- Carries: Pedestrians and cyclists
- Crosses: Ottawa River, Lemieux Island
- Locale: Ottawa-Gatineau, National Capital Region, Canada
- Official name: English: Chief William Commanda Bridge; French: Pont Chef-William-Commanda (since July 2021)
- Named for: Chief William Commanda
- Owner: City of Ottawa

Characteristics
- Design: Truss bridge

Rail characteristics
- No. of tracks: 0 (rails have been removed for re-opening as a shared-use path)
- Track gauge: 4 ft 8 1/2 in (1,435 mm) standard gauge
- Structure gauge: AAR

History
- Opened: 1880 reopened on August 4, 2023
- Closed: 2005

Location
- Interactive map of Chief William Commanda Bridge

The Chief William Commanda Bridge (French: Pont Chef-William-Commanda), formerly the Prince of Wales Bridge (French: Pont Prince de Galles), is a pedestrian and cycling bridge, as well as a former rail bridge, that spans the Ottawa River between Ottawa, Ontario and Gatineau, Quebec, Canada. It connects the Trillium Pathway in Ottawa to the Voyageurs Pathway in Gatineau. The bridge crosses the south channel of the river to Lemieux Island at the edge of Nepean Bay and continues across the northern channel into the Province of Quebec.

The bridge formerly connected with the Bytown and Prescott Railway line just west of Lebreton Flats and was operated by the Canadian Pacific Railway for most of its history. It was bought by the City of Ottawa in 2005. Initial plans to incorporate it as part of an interprovincial public transportation link eventually fell through and it was repurposed for pedestrian and cycling use as part of the Capital Pathway shared-use path network.

It is a multi-span Pratt truss bridge, consisting of six equal spans over the south channel, and seven spans over the north channel; the second-last span, proceeding northward, is longer by a factor of about 1.7.

== History ==
=== 19th century ===
The bridge was built by the Quebec, Montreal, Ottawa and Occidental Railway in 1880, named for Albert Edward, Prince of Wales. At that time, it was one of the few crossings of the Ottawa River, and was one of the most valuable assets of the line, which was owned by the Quebec provincial government. The QMO&O continued to lose money, however, and it was purchased by the Canadian Pacific Railway (CPR) in 1882, which connected it with their other recent purchase, the Canada Central Railway. This connection gave the CPR a solid route from their westward line being built from North Bay to the ports of the St. Lawrence. The bridge was joined by the CPR's Royal Alexandra Interprovincial Bridge in 1901, the second railway bridge to cross the river between Ottawa and Hull.

=== 20th century ===
The bridge served well into the 20th century, but as rail transport diminished and more efficient routes became more common, the line saw less traffic. In 1999, the City of Ottawa leased the CPR line, including the bridge, for the construction of the Trillium Line.

=== 21st century ===
==== 2000s ====
The bridge was used by rail traffic for the last time on July 26, 2001.

In 2005, the bridge was disconnected from the tracks just before its approach on the Ottawa side; this was done for a water line project being built along the Kichi Zibi Mikan as part of the Lebreton Flats revitalization.

In 2005, the City of Ottawa purchased the bridge and associated rail corridors for CA$11 million as part of a plan to link Ottawa's and Gatineau's light rail systems. However, Mayor Jim Watson would later declare that this original plan was unworkable.

The bridge remained unused and the section of track between the Bayview Station and the bridge became overgrown. As the purchase of the bridge included the approaches on both sides, the City of Ottawa now owns property in Quebec.

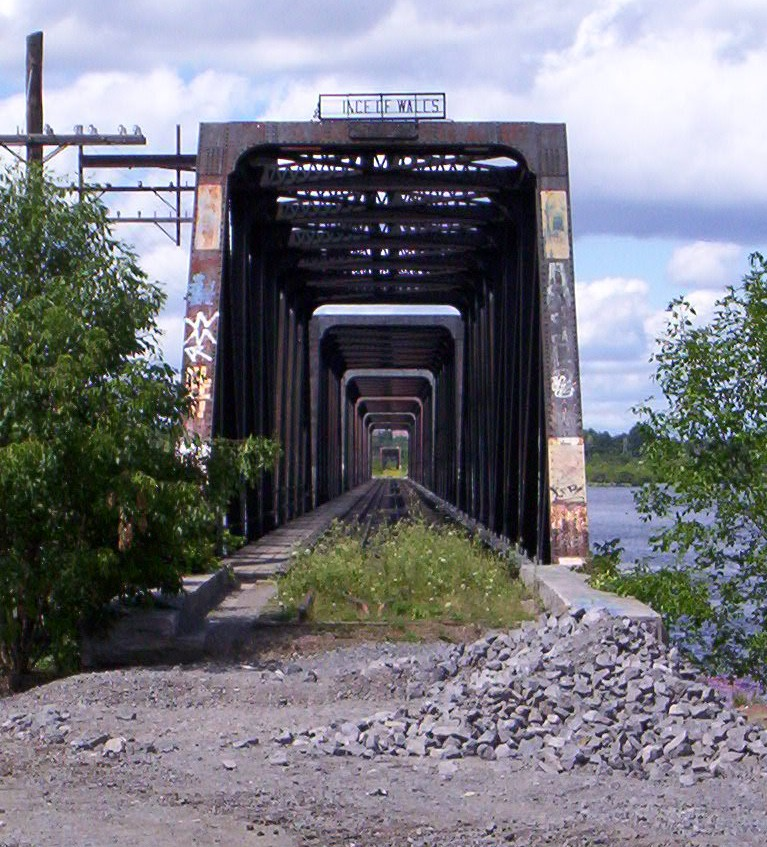
Chief William Commanda Bridge, south approach, July 2005

While the bridge was closed, city officials reported safety concerns. Between January 1, 2005 and August 29, 2016, the Ottawa Police Service received 51 calls about activities at the bridge, three of which resulted in charges being laid, though no complaints related to the structural safety of the bridge itself, rather to possible criminal activity occurring on the property.

==== 2010s ====
In 2016, City of Gatineau officials showed great interest in the bridge as a transit link between the two cities, but modifications would need to be made, as there is only enough room for a single track on the bridge; the City of Ottawa has now permanently built over this rail infrastructure to create the new Trillium Line station at Bayview.

In September 2016 the City of Ottawa spent $46,000 to install new chain-link fences to block entrance to the bridge, although the fence was breached shortly afterwards. In September 2016, a pop-up picnic led by residents was organized in opposition to the proposed barricades. At the end of year 2016, the city had no plans to convert the bridge into a pedestrian or cycling path, which it said would cost $10.5 million. Rather, their stated goal was to use the bridge as an interprovincial rail link, connecting OC Transpo’s Trillium Line with Gatineau’s rapid transit network, although there has now been permanent and illegal building over of this rail infrastructure by the City of Ottawa. It was also proposed that this rail link might become part of a proposed commuter rail system.

In February 2018, the Canadian Transportation Agency ruled that the city breached its duty as a rail line owner when it dismantled a section of tracks near the bridge in order to build a new entrance to Bayview Station of the new Light Rail System. The CTA gave the City of Ottawa two options: to sell a portion of the rail line leading to the bridge or to restore the tracks so they can accommodate rail traffic within 12 months. In statements, Ottawa mayor Jim Watson asserted that, "We don't have the funds to put rail across to Quebec at this point." While there had been funding put aside for the work several years earlier, it has since been re-directed to a pedestrian bridge over the Rideau Canal.

In April 2019 (a federal election year), the Federal Cabinet issued an Order In Council rescinding the Canadian Transportation Agency's decision, meaning that the City of Ottawa would no longer need to appeal the order to repair the rail link, also rejecting a petition from Moose Consortium Ltd., which wanted to use the bridge as part of a commuter rail project spanning the Ottawa River. The order in council dated April 5 stated that "the agency's decision went against national policy because it would force a railway company to invest in an "unused and non-profitable railway line," or discontinue it permanently", despite the Moose consortium indicating that it actively wanted to invest in this rail infrastructure.

As of June 2019, the City of Gatineau's design for its planned Société de transport de l'Outaouais LRT system, which would launch in 2028, would see it cross the bridge to link to Ottawa's O-Train system at Bayview Station. However, in September 2019, Ottawa Mayor Watson declared that the Prince of Wales bridge will “never” be used for interprovincial commuter rail, offering the explanation that it would be "far too congested to have so many people drop off at one of the busiest intersections in our LRT system", though without offering explanation as to why the recently built station in question, which could have been designed to manage this commuter traffic, was effectively designed to block any future use of the railway.

==== 2020s ====
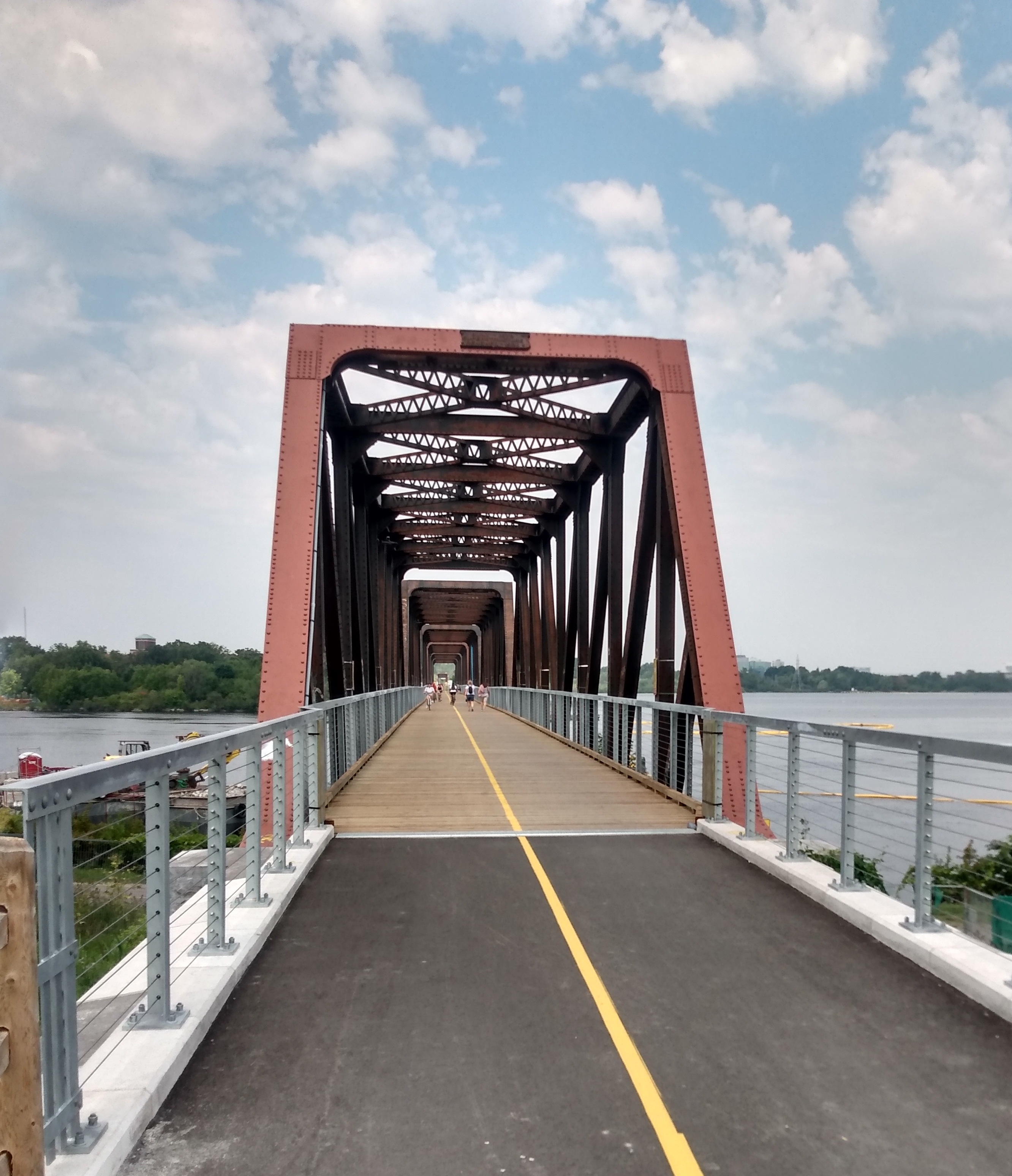
Chief William Commanda Bridge, south approach, August 2023 after it was opened to pedestrian and cyclist traffic

In December 2020, the City of Ottawa began considering an interim multi-use pathway on the bridge. In July 2021, Ottawa City Council committed to spending $14 million to upgrade the bridge into a pedestrian bridge, and officially renamed the bridge to the Chief William Commanda Bridge, in honour of William Commanda who was the chief of the Kitigan Zibi Anishinabeg First Nation from 1951 to 1970. $8.6 million was pledged to the project by the federal government. Construction began in the fall of 2021, and the multi-use pathway was expected to be completed by the fall of 2022 with additional rehabilitation work being completed by 2024.

In May 2022, the City of Ottawa was sued for $1.5 million in a negligence case involving the death of a 14-year-old boy who drowned after climbing through the fencing barring access to the bridge and jumping into the Ottawa River. According to the family's lawyer, Lawrence Greenspon, the City failed to take effective steps to prevent the public from accessing the bridge.

On 4 August 2023, the bridge opened for pedestrian and cyclist use. In November, it closed for the winter.

== See also ==
- Letsgomoose
- List of bridges in Ottawa
- List of crossings of the Ottawa River
- Quebec Gatineau Railway
- Line 2
- William Commanda
- Capital Pathway
- Royal eponyms in Canada
