= Dorval station (Via Rail) =

Railway station in Montreal, Quebec, Canada

Dorval
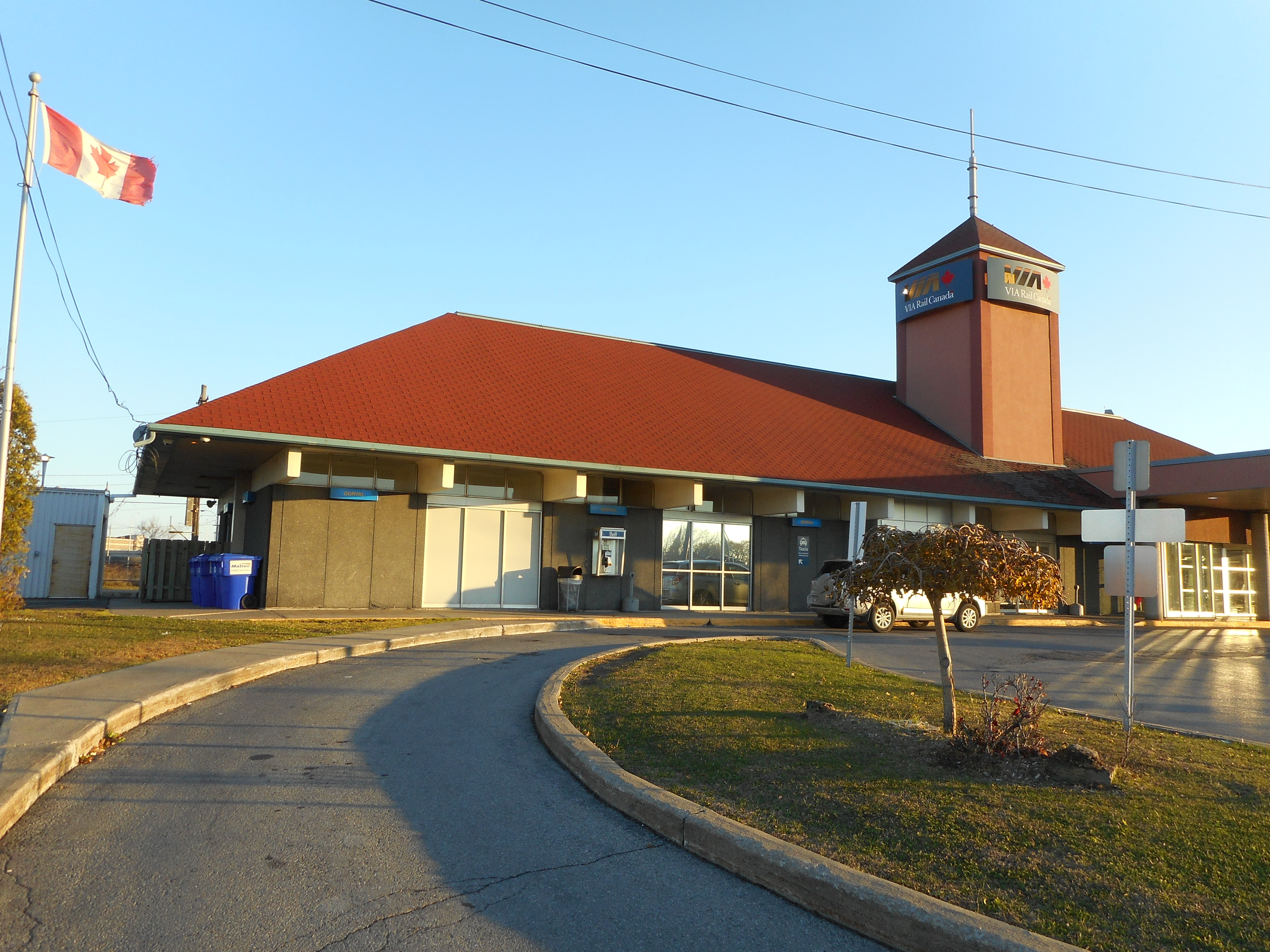
- Main Entrance (South)

General information
- Location: 755 Montreal-Toronto Boulevard; Dorval, Quebec; Canada
- Coordinates: 45°26′56″N 73°44′29″W
- Platforms: 2 side platforms
- Tracks: 2
- Train operators: Via Rail
- Connections: Terminus Dorval; Dorval (Exo); AirConnect shuttle bus to Montréal–Trudeau International Airport

Construction
- Structure type: At-grade
- Parking: 300 spaces (surface lot)
- Accessible: Yes

Other information
- Status: Staffed station
- Station code: DORV
- IATA code: XAX
- Website: Dorval train station

Services
Preceding station	Via Rail	Following station
Cornwall toward Toronto	Toronto–Montreal	Montreal Terminus
Coteau toward Ottawa or Fallowfield	Ottawa–Montreal	Montreal Terminus
Coteau toward Ottawa	Ottawa–Québec City	Montreal toward Quebec City
Former services
Preceding station	Via Rail	Following station
Ottawa toward Vancouver	The Canadian before 1990	Montreal Terminus
Preceding station	Canadian National Railway	Following station
Pointe Claire toward Ottawa	Montreal – Ottawa; Semi-local stops	Lachine toward Montreal
Strathmore toward Vaudreuil	Montreal – Vaudreuil; Local stops	Dixie toward Montreal
Location
- Location within Montreal Location within Southern Quebec Location within Quebec Location within Canada

Dorval station (French: Gare de Dorval, IATA: XAX) is an inter-city train station in the city of Dorval, Quebec, Canada operated by Via Rail. It is located 2 kilometres (1.2 mi) south of Montréal–Pierre Elliott Trudeau International Airport near the intersection of Quebec Autoroute 20 (Boulevard Bouchard) and Quebec Autoroute 520. It is a stop for all Corridor trains between Toronto, Ottawa and Montreal.

North of the station building, trains call at two standard-level side platforms connected by an underground passageway.

Dorval station is located directly east of the Dorval commuter rail station operated by Exo. Although the stations do not share any platforms, they and the Dorval STM bus terminus are within walking distance of one another.

A shuttle bus, known as "Air Connect", links Dorval station to Montréal–Pierre Elliott Trudeau International Airport and is free of charge to Via Rail passengers. The bus departs every 45–60 minutes from the station and takes around five minutes of travel time to reach the airport departures level.

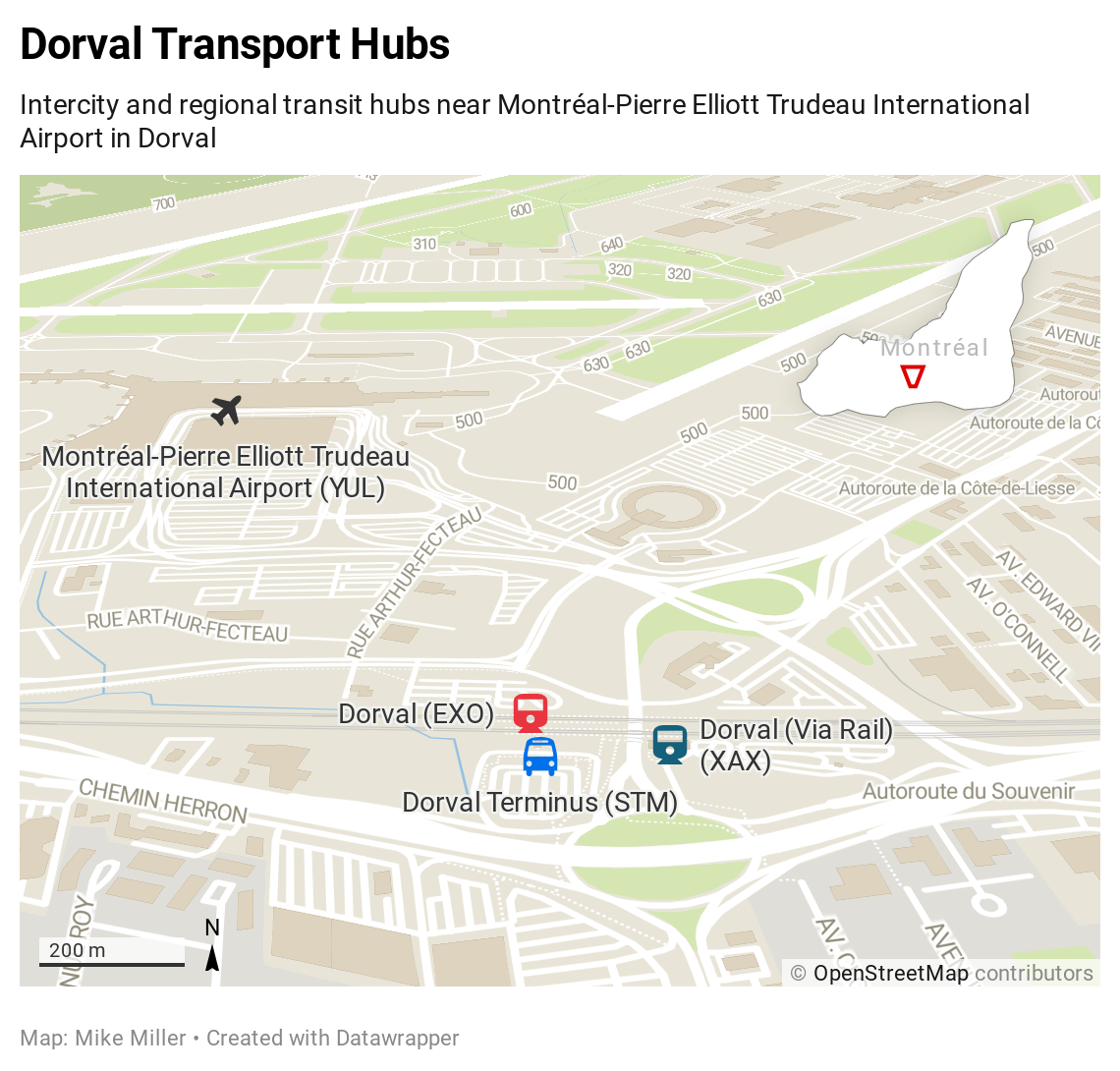
Intercity and regional transit hubs near Montréal-Pierre Elliott Trudeau International Airport in Dorval

== Future ==
A technical study has been conducted by Transport Canada on how to integrate the inter-city rail, regional rail, and bus services at the various Dorval stations into a new Dorval Intermodal Hub with improved access to the airport. A new station serving Via and Exo on the site of the current Exo station is expected to begin construction in 2027.

== Station services ==
The station is staffed and offers ticket sales, wifi (in the station and business lounge), washrooms and a seating area. It is also wheelchair-accessible and has a wheelchair lift for boarding trains.

A Via Rail business lounge is located in the northwest corner of the station, adjacent to the tracks. Access is restricted to business class travellers.
