= Rinfret, Quebec =

Railway junction in Quebec, Canada

Rinfret is a railway junction in the city of Saint-Jérôme in the Canadian province of Quebec.

It is located at mile 36.4 of the Montfort Spur of the Quebec Gatineau Railway. Its latitude and longitude are 45.75167°N 73.99306°W, also written as 45°45′06″N 73°59′35″W.

One reference states that one of the lines that meet at this junction was built by the Great Northern Railway of Canada, which was later acquired by Canadian Northern Railway.

== See also ==
- Rinfret (list of notable persons with the surname Rinfret)
