= Rinfret =

Surname

Rinfret is a surname. Notable people with the surname include:

People

- Édouard Rinfret (1905–1994), Canadian lawyer, politician and judge
- Côme Isaïe Rinfret (1847–1911), Canadian physician and politician
- Fernand Rinfret (1883–1939), Canadian politician
- Maurice Rinfret (1915–1967), Liberal party member of the Canadian House of Commons
- Pierre Andrew Rinfret (1924–2006), founder of Rinfret-Boston Associates, economic advisor, Republican Candidate for Governor of New York in 1990
- Rémi-Ferdinand Rinfret (1819–1901), physician and political figure in Quebec
- Thibaudeau Rinfret, PC (1879–1962), Canadian jurist and Chief Justice of Canada

Places

- Rinfret, Quebec, railway junction in Saint-Jérôme, Quebec
