= Coteau station =

Railway station in Quebec, Canada

Coteau
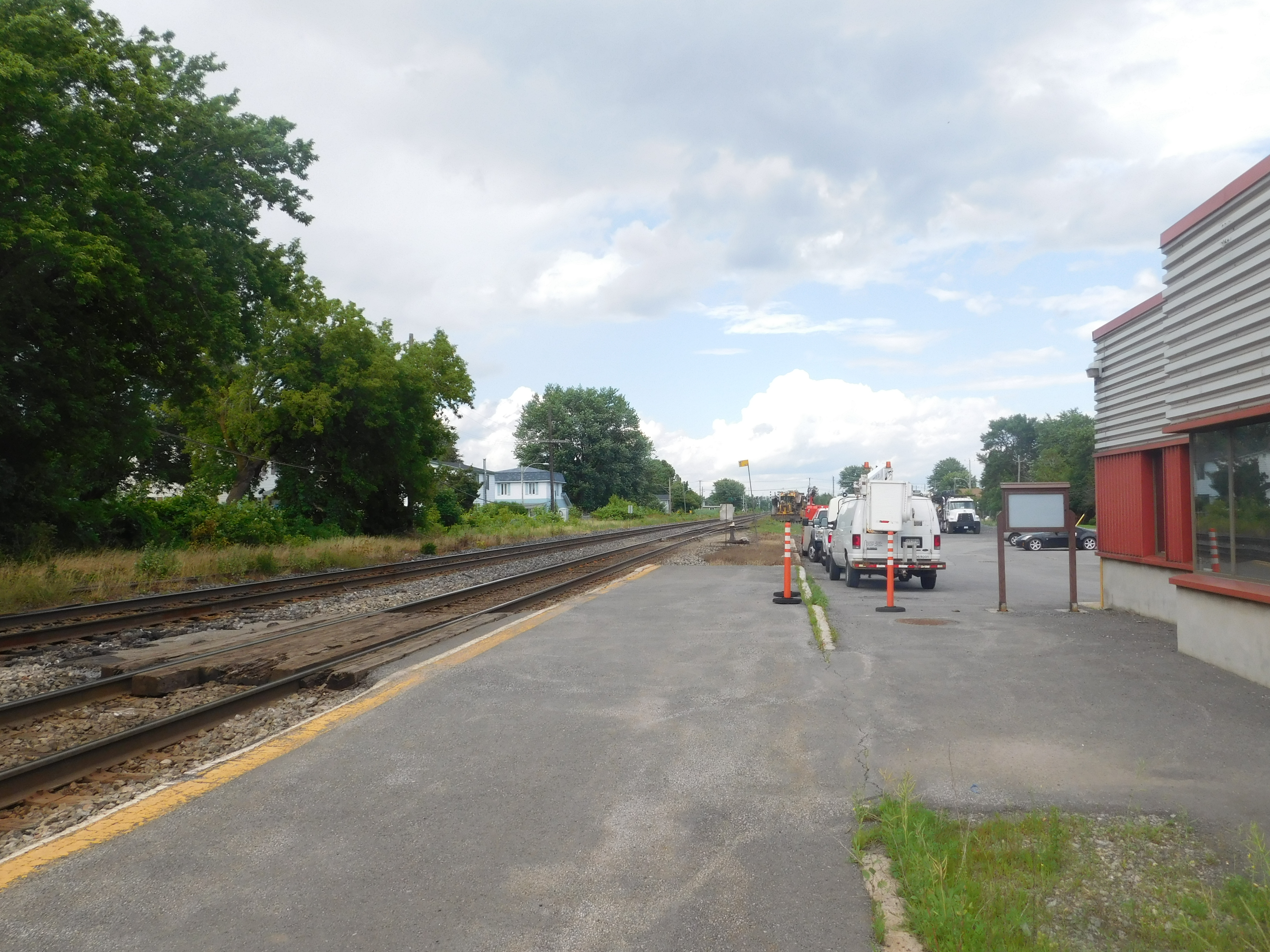
- Coteau station in July 2017.

General information
- Location: 50 rue Daoust; Coteau, QC; Canada
- Coordinates: 45°16′29″N 74°13′58″W
- Owner: CN
- Operator: VIA Rail Canada
- Platforms: 1 side platform
- Tracks: 2
- Train operators: VIA Rail Canada
- Bus routes: 97
- Bus stands: None
- Bus operators: exo Sud-Ouest

Construction
- Structure type: Sign post
- Platform levels: 1
- Parking: Yes
- Accessible: Yes

Other information
- Status: Sign Post
- Station code: COTO
- Website: Coteau train station

History
- Former names: Coteau Junction
- Original company: GTR, CNR and CAR

Services
Preceding station	Via Rail	Following station
Alexandria toward Ottawa or Fallowfield	Ottawa–Montreal	Dorval toward Montreal
Alexandria toward Ottawa	Ottawa–Québec City	Dorval toward Quebec City
Former services
Preceding station	Canadian National Railway	Following station
St. Polycarpe toward Vancouver	Main Line	Vaudreuil toward Montreal
St. Polycarpe toward Ottawa	Montreal – Ottawa; Semi-local stops	Cedars toward Montreal
Terminus	Chambord – Dolbeau	Soulanges toward Chambord
St. Zotique toward Sarnia	Grand Trunk Railway; Main Line	Wilsonvale toward Montreal
Location
- Location within Southern Quebec Location within Quebec Location within Canada

Coteau station is located on Daoust Street in the town of Les Coteaux, Quebec, Canada. It is an optional stop on the Via Rail Ottawa-Montreal Corridor line. The station is unstaffed and is wheelchair-accessible.

== Railway services ==
Coteau station is only served on request by certain trains between Ottawa and Montreal. Other Ottawa-Montreal trains, and all Toronto-Montreal trains pass by the station without stopping.

As of July 2025, Coteau station is served by 2 to 3 trains per day in each direction between Ottawa and Montreal.
