= Ottawa station =

Inter-city train station in Ontario, Canada

Ottawa
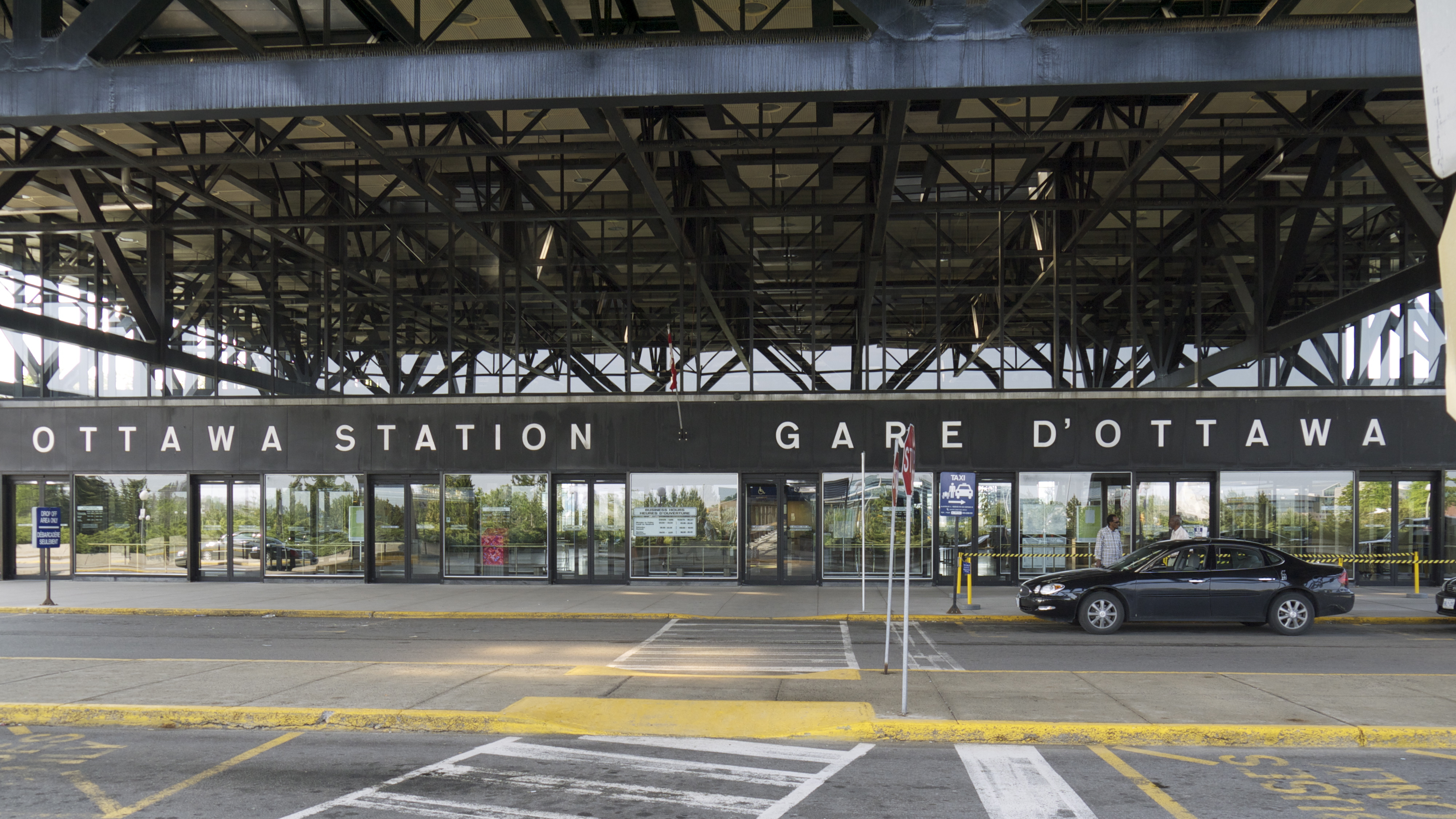
- Main entrance in 2013

General information
- Location: 200 Tremblay Road; Ottawa, Ontario; Canada
- Coordinates: 45°24′59″N 75°39′06″W
- Owner: Via Rail
- Line: Corridor
- Platforms: 1 standard-level side platform; 3 low-level island platforms
- Tracks: 5
- Bus operators: Air France-KLM (to YUL); FlixBus; Ontario Northland; Orléans Express
- Connections: Tremblay; N39; Confederation Pathway

Construction
- Structure type: At-grade
- Parking: 330 spaces
- Cycle facilities: Bicycle parking racks; Bike check service on some trains
- Accessible: Yes
- Architect: John B. Parkin & Associates
- Architectural style: International

Other information
- Status: Staffed station
- Station code: OTTW
- IATA code: XDS
- Website: Ottawa train station

History
- Opened: July 31, 1966; 60 years ago
- Rebuilt: 2016–2018

Key dates
- 2020: LEED Gold certification

Passengers
- FY2016: 800,000+ yearly

Services
Preceding station	Via Rail	Following station
Fallowfield toward Toronto	Toronto–Ottawa	Terminus
Terminus	Ottawa–Montreal	Casselman toward Montreal
Fallowfield Limited service Terminus	Ottawa–Montreal	Casselman toward Montreal
Terminus	Ottawa–Québec City	Casselman toward Quebec City

Former services
Preceding station	Via Rail	Following station
Carleton Place toward Vancouver	The Canadian before 1990	Dorval toward Montreal

Heritage Railway Station (Canada)
- Official name: Ottawa Railway Station
- Designated: June 1, 1996
- Reference no.: 15815
Location
- Location within Ottawa Location within Southern Ontario Location within Ontario Location within Canada

Ottawa station (French: Gare d'Ottawa, IATA: XDS), or Ottawa Train Station, is the main inter-city train station in Ottawa, Ontario, Canada. It is located 4 kilometres (2.5 mi) east of downtown Ottawa, adjacent to Tremblay O-Train station in the neighbourhood of Eastway Gardens. The station is operated by Via Rail and serves inter-city trains connecting to Toronto, Kingston, Montreal and Quebec City on Via Rail's Corridor Route. It also serves as an intercity bus stop for several bus operators.

== Location ==
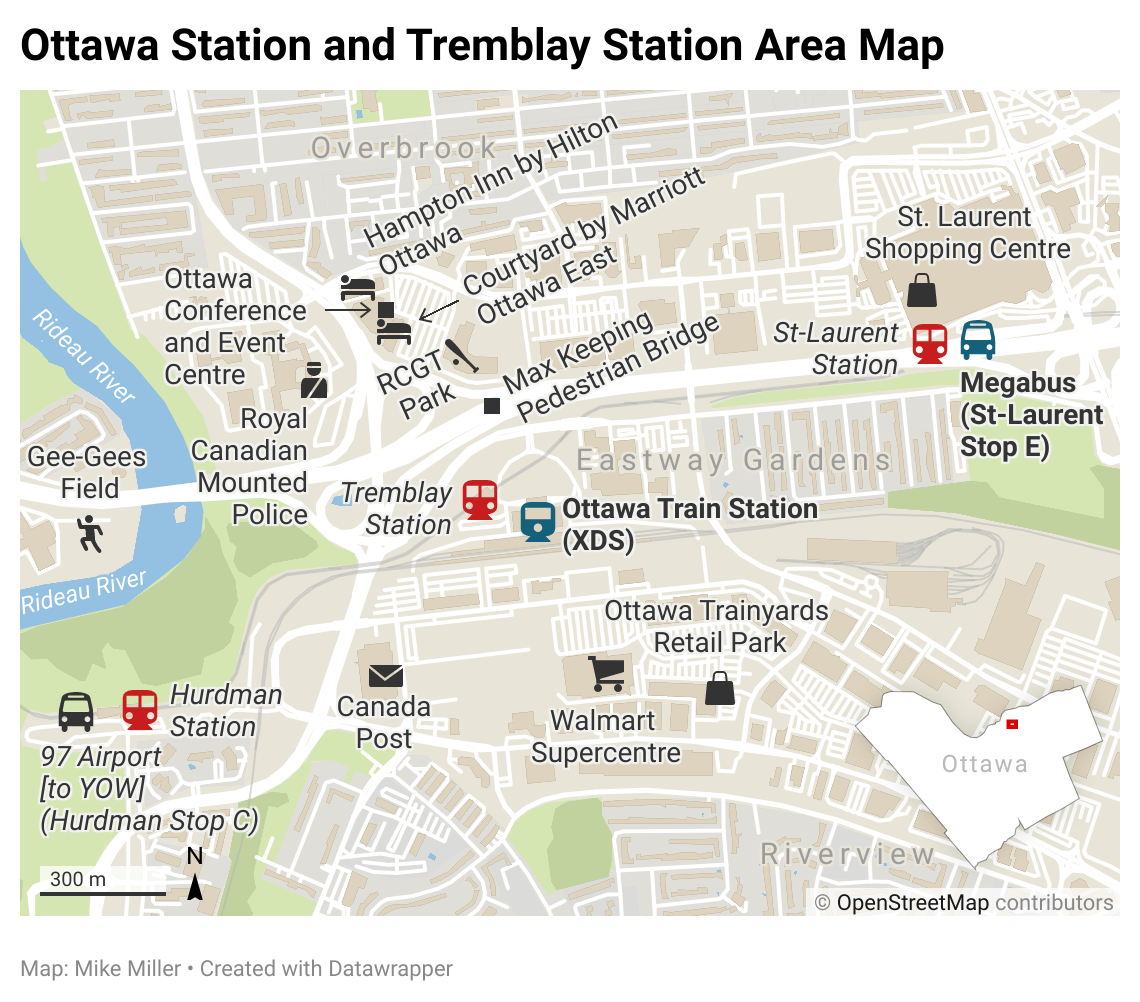
Ottawa and Tremblay station area map

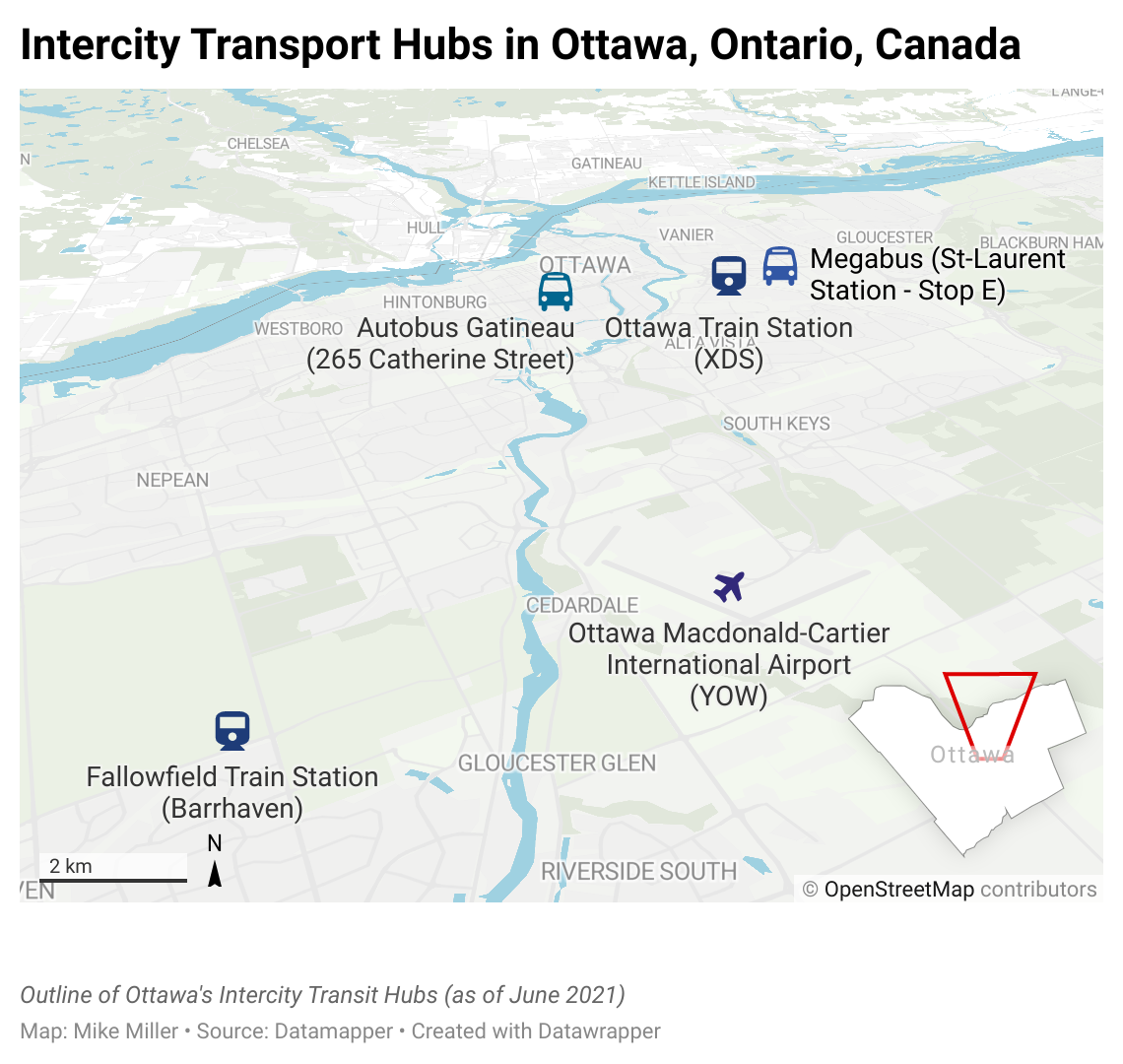
Intercity transport hubs in Ottawa, Ontario

Ottawa station is located at 200 Tremblay Road, which lies directly south of Ontario Highway 417 (known locally as the Queensway) near Exit 117 and east of Riverside Drive (Regional Road 19) in an industrial park area. The station's main entrance faces north towards Tremblay Road.

To the northeast of the station area lies the Max Keeping Pedestrian Bridge, which provides pedestrian and bicycle access north across Highway 417 to Ottawa Stadium (a minor-league baseball stadium), the Courtyard by Marriott Ottawa East and Hampton Inn by Hilton Ottawa (the closest hotels to the station). These two hotels are connected to each other by the Ottawa Conference and Event Centre and are located within a short walking distance to the west of the stadium parking lot. All of these locations are within a 10–15 minute walk from the station.

South of the station, across the railroad tracks and Terminal Avenue lies the Ottawa Train Yards power centre shopping complex which includes a number of big-box stores. There is no direct pedestrian connection south across the railroad tracks to the Ottawa Train Yards, so they may only be accessed by a longer route via Belfast Road (to the east of the station). Currently, the City of Ottawa is evaluating proposals to create a pedestrian and cycle crossing across the tracks from Tremblay O-Train station to Terminal Avenue.

Far to the northeast of the station, across the 417 highway cloverleaf and next to the Rideau River is an office complex of the Royal Canadian Mounted Police.

Ottawa station is located approximately 14 kilometres (8.7 mi) north of the Ottawa Macdonald–Cartier International Airport. It takes 30 minutes to get there by public transport and 19 minutes by car or taxi. The station is also conveniently accessible from the Confederation O-train LRT Tremblay station, located 50 meters away. An O-train trip from a downtown Ottawa LRT station, such as Parliament or Rideau station, to Ottawa train station and vice-versa takes 13 and 10 minutes, respectively.

== History ==
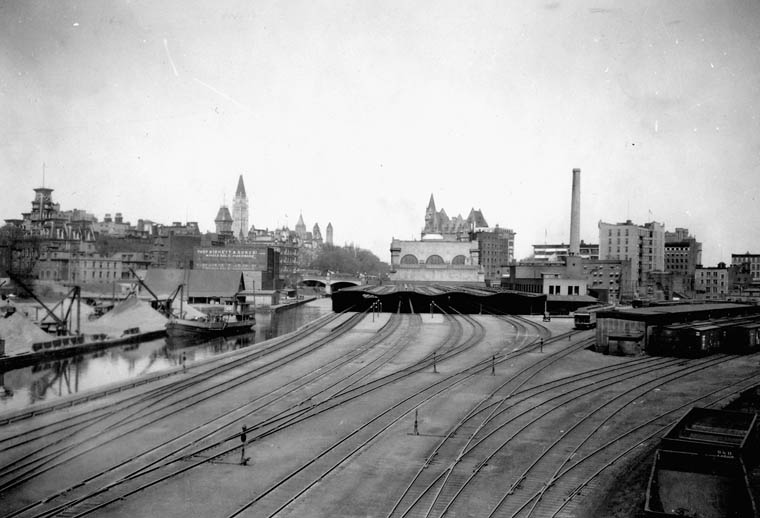
Ottawa's former Union Station in the 1920s

For more information on the early history of rail in Ottawa, see Ottawa Union Station.

The first passenger rail services in Ottawa began in 1854 with the opening of the Bytown and Prescott Railway. Several other railways subsequently began operations, and their services were eventually consolidated at Ottawa Union Station, which was active from 1912 to 1966. This station was located on Rideau Street, directly across from the Château Laurier Hotel at Confederation Square and near the Parliament buildings. In 1966, railway services were relocated to Eastway Gardens, east of downtown and the Rideau River.

The current Ottawa station is the result of an urban renewal plan by the French urban planner Jacques Greber. The plan was commissioned by Prime Minister of Canada William Lyon Mackenzie King, who sought a re-imagining of the city following World War II.

=== Track relocation ===
Among the proposals in Greber's city plan was the relocation of railway tracks outside the downtown core. This was not the first proposal to relocate trackage away from the central sections of Ottawa, as it had previously been discussed as early as 1915 and 1924. At that time, Ottawa was crossed by 11 train lines with over 150 level crossings, causing numerous traffic disruptions. Many of the railroads that crossed the city at the time were originally built in the nineteenth century to serve the lumber industry and were no longer appropriately sited. The tracks divided neighbourhoods and were considered unsightly.

Additionally, trains at that time were pulled by steam locomotives, which brought their noise and soot to the downtown Union Station and rail yard. As Time Magazine noted in 1948:

"Ottawa, dominated by the anachronistic Gothic buildings of Parliament, has remained frowzy, a city where trains run through the center of town and chuff smoke into the foyer of the best hotel."

Greber sought to clean up the downtown by relocating rail traffic outside of the city center. Part of this involved the construction of a new train station.

The final decision to remove tracks from the downtown core was finalized in 1950, a time when transitioning to cleaner diesel locomotives seemed like a distant future possibility. Despite the transition to diesel occurring earlier than expected in 1960, plans for track relocation and a new station continued. A land swap was arranged between the Federal District Commission (now National Capital Commission) and the Canadian National and Canadian Pacific railways in which they gave up their downtown railyards east of the Rideau Canal and railway rights of way through Ottawa in exchange for land near Walkley Road, where the Walkley Train Yard would be extended. This reduced the number of trains travelling through the downtown core, opened up new land for development downtown and provided the east-west right of way for what would later become the Queensway (Highway 417).

=== The new Ottawa station ===
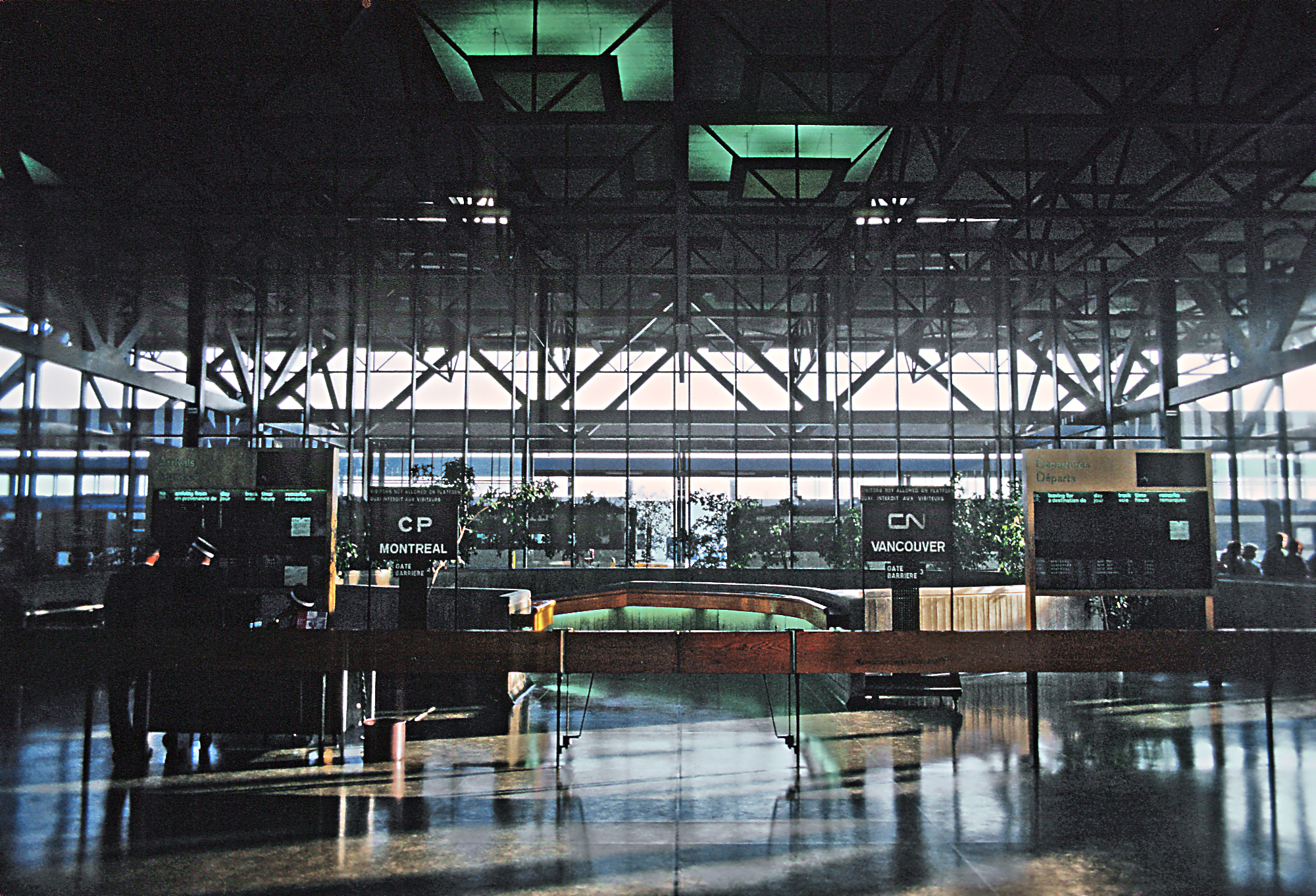
Interior (1971)

The construction of a new railway terminal on 440 acres (180 ha) of land near Hurdman Bridge was announced in May 1961. The site was chosen because Ottawa's population was moving southward, it offered easy access to the Queensway, and there was ample room for parking. Additionally, the land that would make up the proposed site was already largely owned by the railways and the Government of Canada. It was thought that the terminal would become the hub of a new commercial and industrial area. The cost of the new train station, tracks and equipment amounted to around CA$35,000,000.

The new Ottawa station was built to accommodate the passenger services of the Canadian National Railway (CNR) and the Canadian Pacific Railway (CPR). It was the last of the monumental union stations to be built in Canada. It was seen as an attempt to project a modern and futuristic image of rail travel in an era when it was being increasingly superseded by other means of transportation.

The station was designed by the modernist architect John Cresswell Parkin of John B. Parkin & Associates in collaboration with the Montreal firm Affleck, Desbarats, Dimakopoulos, Lebensold, Michaud & Sise. Their design reflects a mix of modernism and Beaux Arts planning principles. The station opened on July 31, 1966, just a few months prior to the start of Canadian Centennial celebrations. The first train to arrive was the Canadian Pacific Railway's Rideau from Montreal, which left shortly afterwards at 9:04 a.m.

Per a sign located inside the station:

"The Ottawa Station was completed in 1966 as part of a plan for the relocation and consolidation of many railway lines built between 1854 and 1916. The new arrangement was based on the plans of the noted urban planner, Jacques Greber, and was constructed by the National Capital Commission. The Canadian National Railway and the Canadian Pacific railway are owners and operators of the new installations."

Throughout its history, the station has won several architectural awards. It won a Silver Massey Medal for Architecture in 1967. In 2000, the Royal Architectural Institute of Canada named the station as one of the top 500 buildings produced in Canada during the last millennium, and in 2007 it was awarded the Landmark Award by the Ontario Association of Architects.

=== Criticism ===
It would be true to say the closer you get to Ottawa, the farther you are from people who live along the tracks. It is possible to live in the nation's capital and not know where the Ottawa train station is located. It used to be within sight of Parliament Hill, but the old station is now part of the government gas works, used for First Ministers meetings and other talkathons.

— Dalton Camp

While the relocation of Ottawa station seemed like a good idea in 1948, the move to the outskirts of Ottawa put rail travel at a comparative disadvantage to other forms of transportation in the city. Although passenger rail travel collapsed across North America following World War II, the downtown station may have maintained a higher market share over time and been useful for commuter rail due to its close proximity on foot to many destinations.

Prior to the establishment of Via Rail in 1977, there was a trend in several Canadian cities, including Quebec City, Saskatoon, and Victoria, to close downtown stations and rebuild them in suburban areas. At the time, it seemed to many local governments that the benefits of removing tracks and railyards from downtown areas outweighed the benefits of providing rail access directly to downtown, as passenger rail appeared to be declining and increasingly irrelevant.

These decisions helped accelerate the decline in passenger rail popularity further, as direct-to-downtown service was one of the few remaining advantages trains had over airplanes. This could be seen at Ottawa station. While Via Rail provided a shuttle bus to the city centre, the increased distance added up to 25 minutes in travel time to the fastest train to Montreal and reduced its competitiveness with other forms of travel.

In 1985, Via Rail President Pierre Franche estimated that Via lost around 15 to 20 percent of their Ottawa business because of the closing of Union Station.

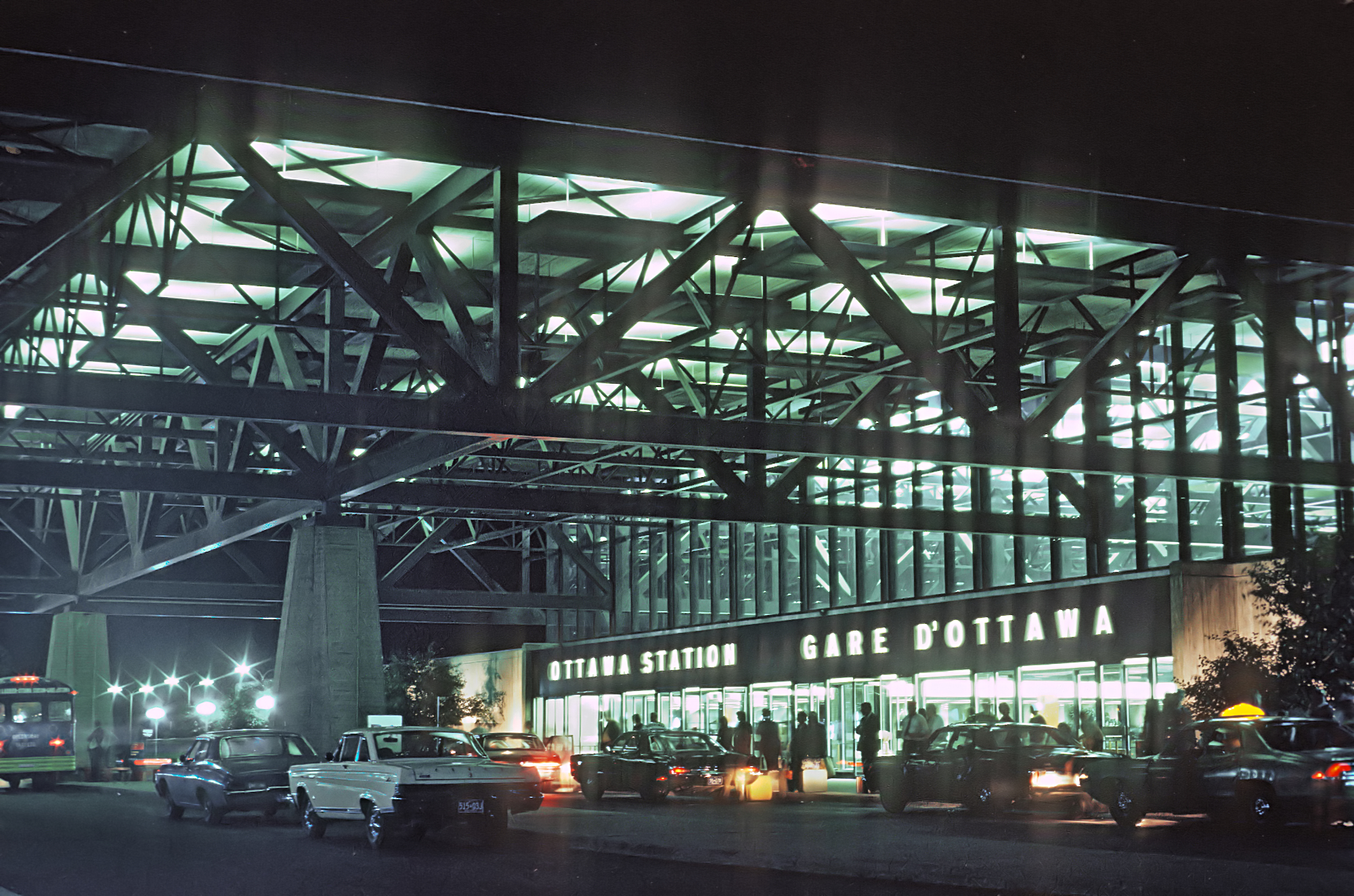
Main entrance (1971)

In addition to its more distant location, public transit service to Ottawa station was absent or minimal for its first 15 years of existence, making it difficult for non-car owners to access. This was partly remedied in 1983 when OC Transpo constructed a Transitway bus rapid transit station (Train station) across from Ottawa station, which would be replaced by Tremblay O-Train station to the west of the Ottawa station building in 2019.

Continued service reductions in the late 1980s and early 1990s further compounded the declining popularity of train travel in Ottawa. Services to Toronto and Montreal were reduced, and Ottawa lost transcontinental service to Vancouver on the Super Continental when the train was cancelled in 1990.

=== Heritage designation ===
The station has been protected under the Heritage Railway Stations Protection Act since 1996. It "is a glass and steel, International style railway station [...] The VIA Rail Station at Ottawa is one of the finest examples of the International style in Canadian architecture."

=== Renovation ===
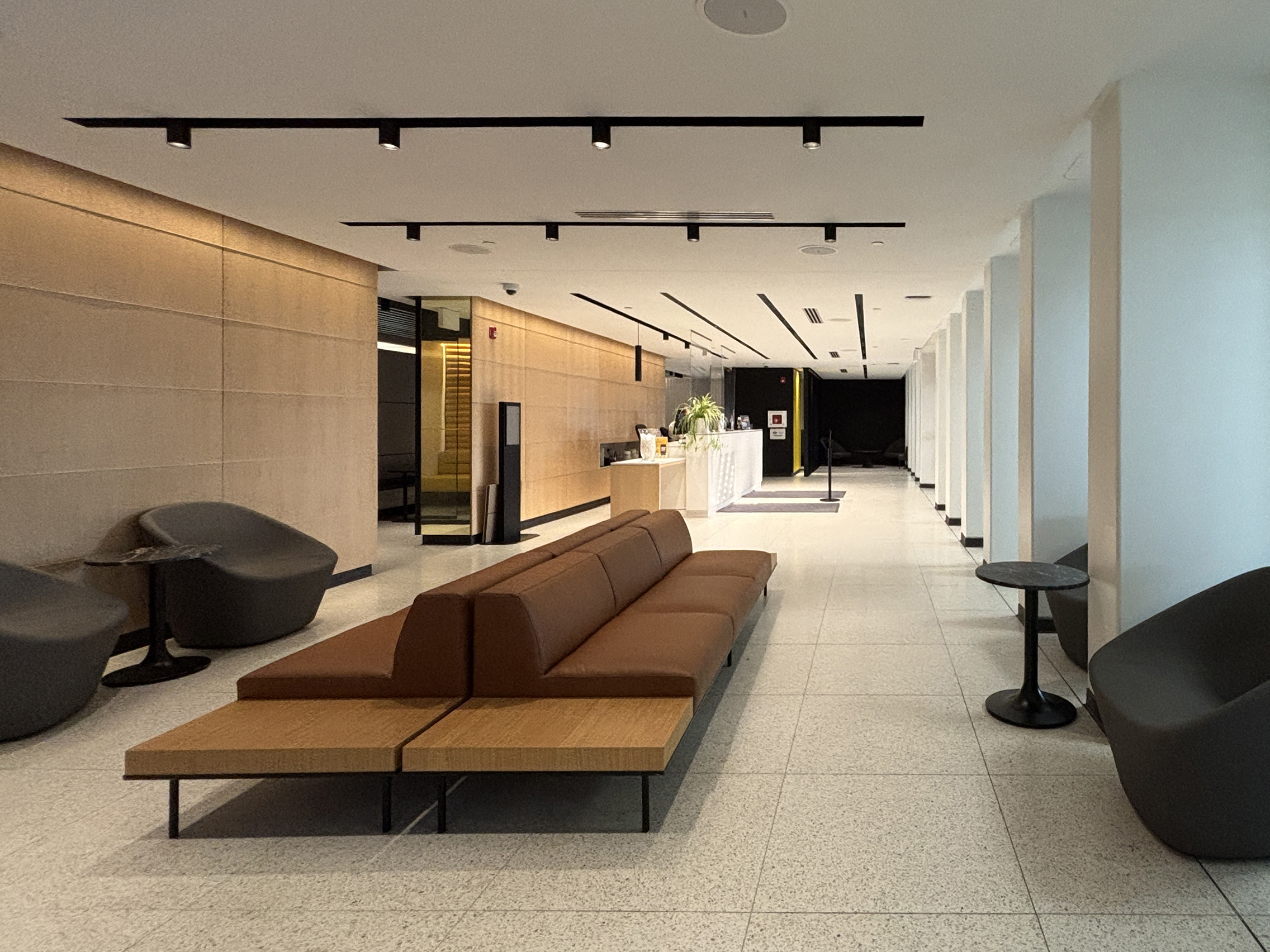
Via Rail business lounge

A $21.7 million renovation project was undertaken from late 2016 to 2018, adding an elevator to enhance accessibility in the spiral ramp and at tracks 3 and 4. The station's Track 1 side platform was also raised from the previous low-level to a standard level for faster and easier boarding. Maintenance work was also carried out on the roof, and a climate-controlled waiting area was built next to Track 1 for departing passengers to wait for their trains.

The station management also began working to attain a LEED Silver green building certification from the Canada Green Building Council.

The official certification process began in 2019, and on August 10, 2020, the building achieved a LEED v4.1 Operation and Maintenance: Existing Buildings certification at the Gold level, earning 68 of a possible 100 LEED points.

==== Accessibility improvements ====
Following the renovations, Via Rail initiated a pilot project to test electronic systems enabling passengers with visual impairments to navigate autonomously between the station entrance and platforms. These tests were carried out in collaboration with the International Union of Railways, Canadian Council of the Blind and the Canadian National Institute for the Blind. The company intends to improve the system and eventually deploy the technology in other stations in its network.

== Station facilities ==
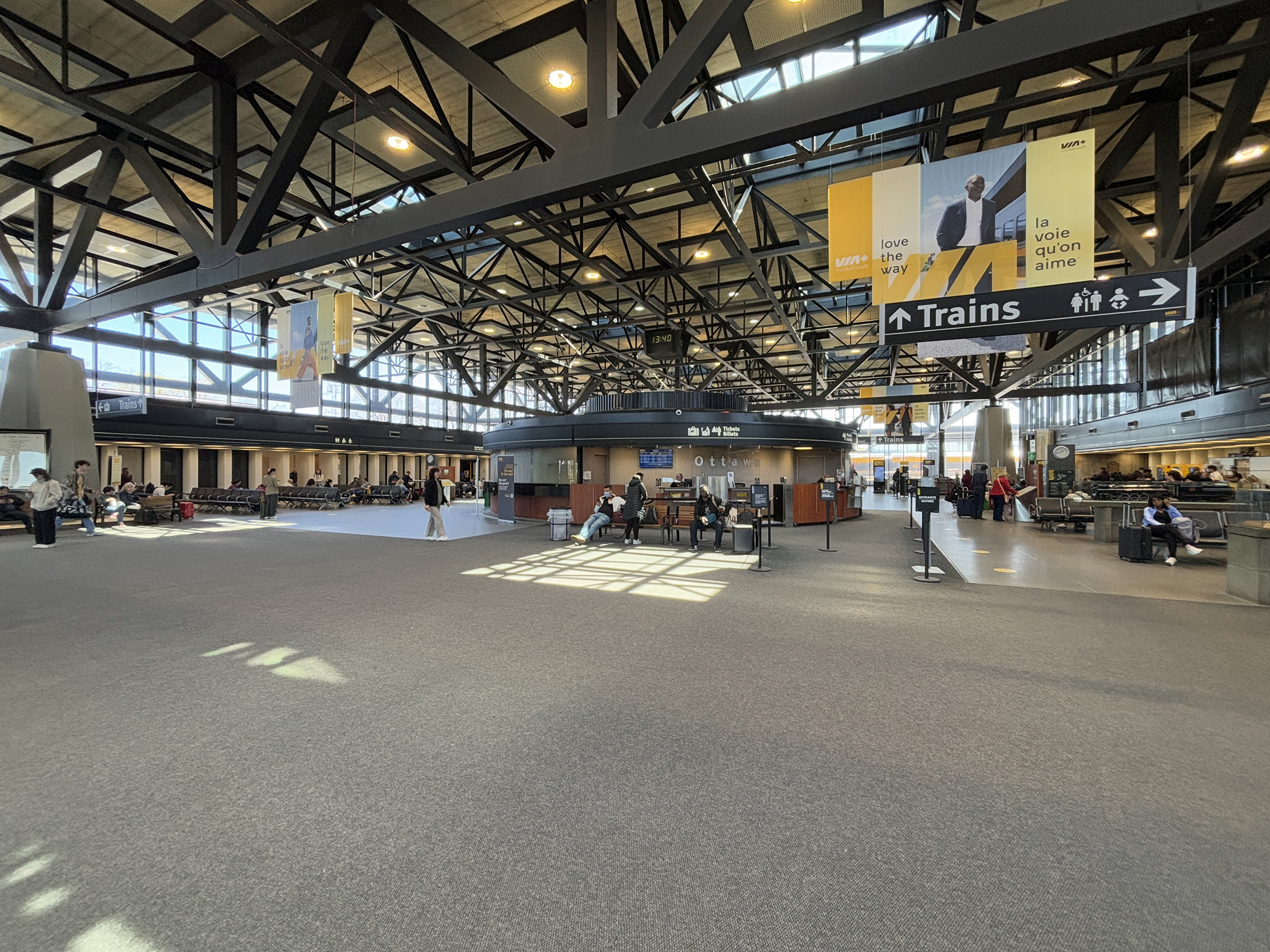
Interior of Ottawa Via Rail Station

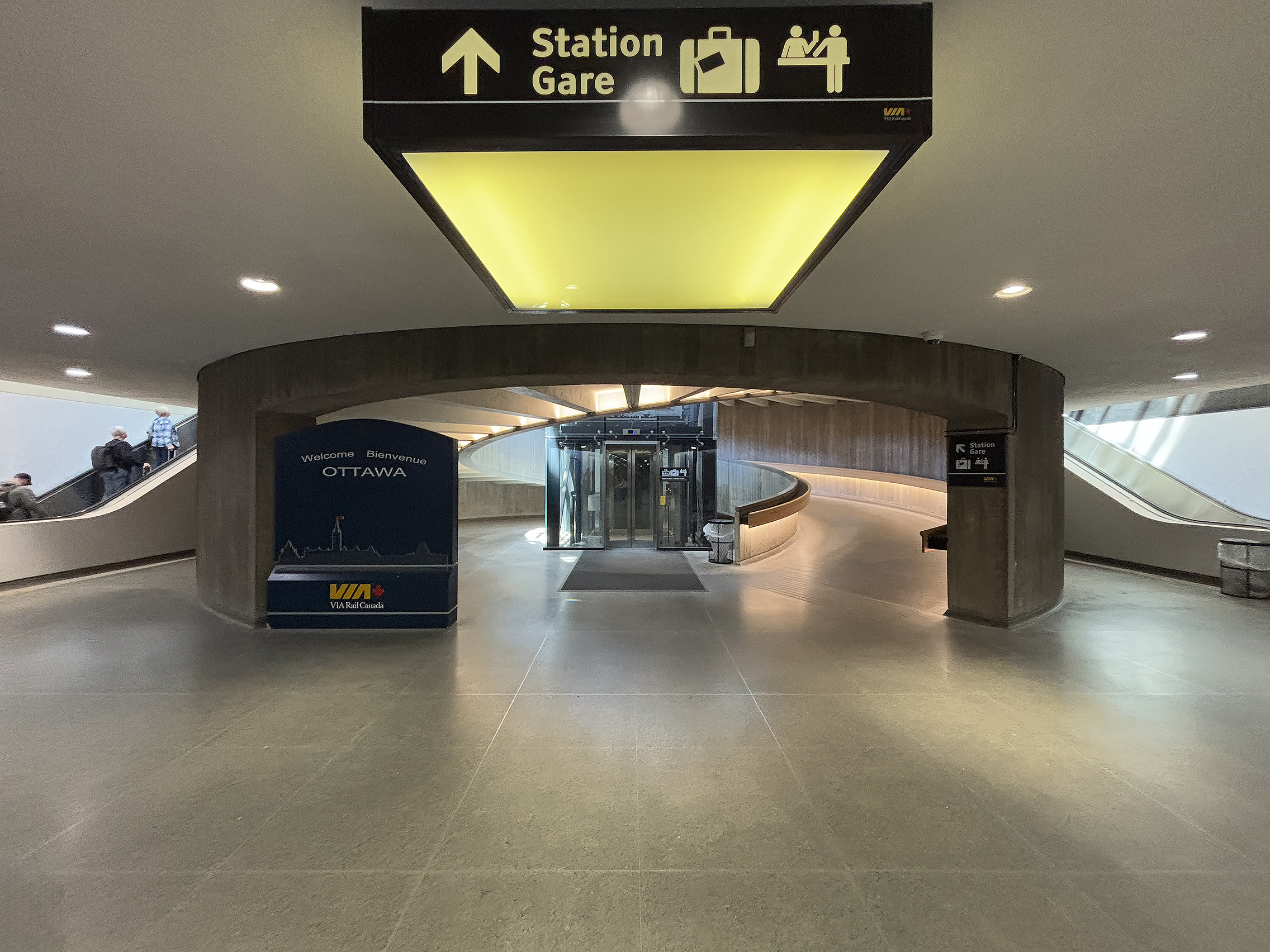
Ramp to concourse

Ottawa station is an international-style building composed of exposed cantilevered Vierendeel trusses and supported by massive concrete piers. This creates a spacious open plan interior with a powerful roofline. The station's walls are a non-loadbearing glass skin and extend through the open steel trusses to the roof deck. None of the interior walls extend above the lower chords of the trusses, allowing for an uninterrupted view of the roof structure.

The station is staffed and offers ticket sales, checked baggage and checkroom service, bicycle box service, an ATM, a cafe/restaurant, vending machines, wifi (in the station and business lounge), telephones and washrooms.

A Via Rail business lounge is located in the southeast corner of the station, adjacent to the tracks. Services include free Wi-Fi, HD television screens with news broadcasts, non-alcoholic beverages and free access to PressReader digital reading materials. Lounge access is restricted to business class travellers for a maximum of two hours prior to departure and two hours after arrival.

The station's entrance, ticket office, washrooms and platforms are wheelchair accessible, and a wheelchair lift is available to assist with boarding. Courtesy wheelchairs are provided, and curbside assistance is also available upon advance request. A service animal relief area is located near the station entrance.

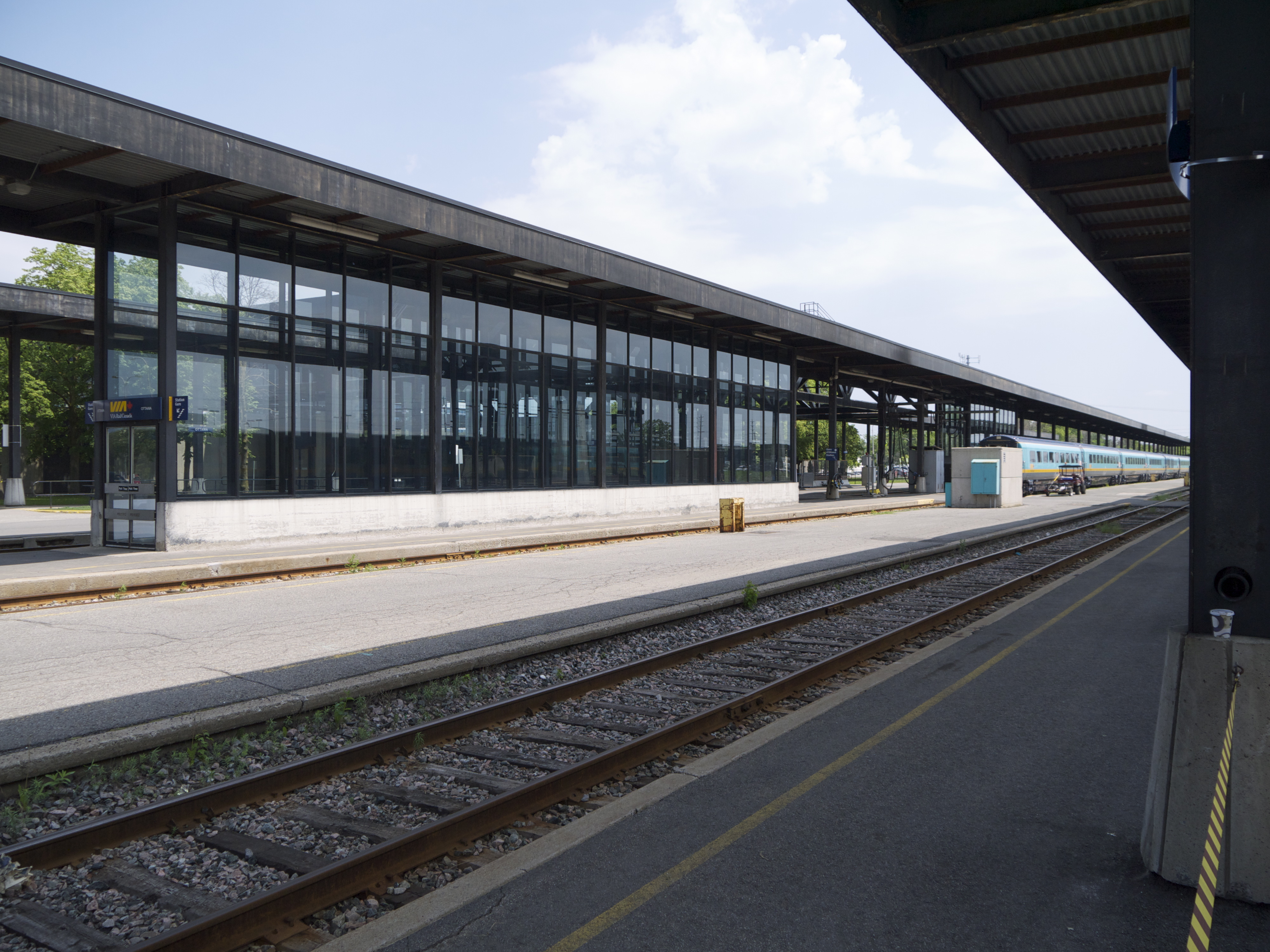
Station platforms in 2013

Trains embark at one standard-level side platform and three low-level island platforms on five tracks. The platforms are connected to the main building via an underground walkway, which is accessible by a circular ramp, elevator, or escalator. The tracks are bordered on the south by offices of the Canada Revenue Agency, surface parking lots and low-rise commercial buildings located on Terminal Avenue.

Intercity coach buses serve three bus platforms in front of the station entrance in a dedicated bus lane.

== Services ==
=== Railway services ===
Ottawa Station is served by all trains on Via Rail's Toronto-Ottawa and Ottawa-Montreal-Quebec services.

As of October 2023, the station is served by 8 to 10 daily roundtrips to Toronto and 4 to 5 roundtrips to Montreal, with 3 to 4 continuing to Quebec City.

=== Intercity bus services ===
Following the closure of Ottawa Central Station in 2021, some intercity bus operators use Ottawa station as a terminus, although others use St-Laurent station.

Intercity coaches
Bus Company	Destinations
FlixBus	Toronto, London, Niagara Falls, Windsor, Detroit
Ontario Northland	Sudbury, North Bay
Orléans Express	Montreal, Kirkland

==== Air France–KLM ====
Air France–KLM runs a connecting shuttle bus from this station to Montréal–Pierre Elliott Trudeau International Airport for Air France and KLM airline passengers only. As of 2016, Air France–KLM has three daily bus services between those cities. Swiss International Air Lines previously operated its Swissbus service from Ottawa station to Montréal–Trudeau International Airport for its passengers.

== Connecting services ==
=== Public transit connections ===
Tremblay station is located adjacent to Ottawa station, and is served by Line 1 of Ottawa's O-Train light rail system.

=== Auto ===
A taxi stand is located outside the main entrance.

Indigo Parking manages 330 surface lot parking spaces. The lot is controlled by an automated, gated system; hourly and monthly rates are available. Inside the lot there is a small electric vehicle charging station.

=== Bicycle access ===
Ottawa station is connected to the Capital Pathway system.

A path located just 250 meters north of Tremblay station connects to the Rideau River Pathway, which provides a slightly longer but easier northbound/westbound route to the city core via Lower Town. Crossing the Rideau River Pedestrian/Cycling Bridge offers a shorter but slightly more complicated westbound route via Sandy Hill, uOttawa and the Rideau Canal Eastern or Western Pathway. Either route requires a 20–30 minute ride.

The Max Keeping Pedestrian Bridge, located 400 meters north of the station, allows cycling and connects the station to the Overbrook and Vanier neighbourhoods on the other side of Highway 417. It also provides access to Coventry Road and the St. Laurent Centre to the east and Ottawa Stadium Raymond Chabot Grant Thornton Park, which is the home of the Ottawa Titans Frontier League minor league baseball team.

== Future ==
In April 2020, developers Colonnade BridgePort and investment firm Fiera Real Estate acquired the 5-acre industrial site immediately to the east of the station, with plans to develop it into a mixed-use residential and commercial centre. Initial proposals include a cluster of six blocks of mixed-use highrises reaching up to 30 storeys. The project is also expected to include a central park and an extensive network of pedestrian and cycling paths to connect the development with Ottawa and Tremblay stations.

== See also ==
- Ottawa Macdonald–Cartier International Airport
- List of Via Rail stations
