= Nepean Bay (Canada) =

Body of water

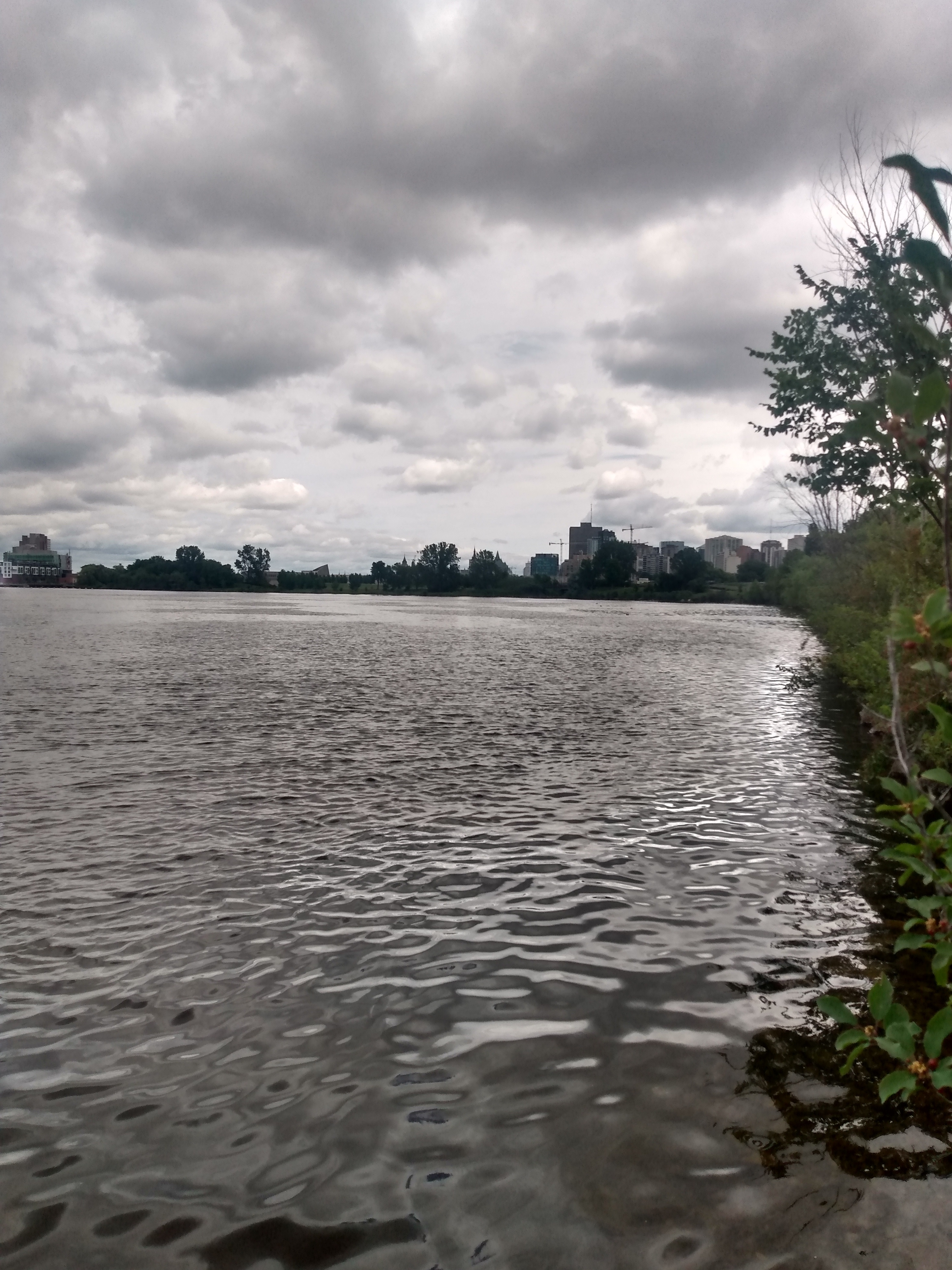

- Location in Ontario
- Location: Ottawa, Ontario, Canada
- Coordinates: 45°24′47″N 75°43′27″W
- Etymology: Sir Evan Nepean
- Part of: Ottawa River
- Primary inflows: Nepean Bay inlet
- Basin countries: Canada
- Max. length: 862 m (2,828 ft)
- Max. width: 287 m (942 ft)
- Surface elevation: 53 m (174 ft)

Nepean Bay, is a bay in the Ottawa River in Ottawa, Ontario, Canada. It is located between Lemieux Island and the Chief William Commanda Bridge on the west and LeBreton Flats on the east.

== History ==
In the early 20th century, the bay was used for Ottawa's drinking water. In 1912, experts deemed the bay "no fit place under which to lay an intake pipe without great precautions", due to the intake pipe being in disrepair due to the number of logs in the bay from Ottawa's lumber industry. During a typhoid fever epidemic at the time, tests taken from drinking water from the bay showed that it was contaminated with pollution. Plans to build a pipeline to carry treated water over the bay as a bridge was dismissed as a "wild undertaking".

In 1938, following complaints of "nude bathing" at the bay, the city entertained the possibility of establishing a public beach at the site.

The southern half of the bay (40 acres) was in-filled with garbage from excavation work on government projects between 1962 and 1965 by the National Capital Commission. The new reclaimed land would be used for park and recreation purposes, and for the construction of the Ottawa River Parkway. The project, which began in 1961 also included a clean-up of the Canadian Pacific Railway tracks and roundhouse in the area. The total cost of the project was estimated at $17,500,000. Originally, the plan was to build a causeway across the bay for the new parkway. The contract to build the parkway along the edge of Nepean Bay was awarded in 1964 to L.J. Corkery Ltd. for $371,969, and involved removing 100,000 cubic yards of sanitary fill from the bay, and replacing it with 300,000 tons of granular fill. This stretch of the parkway was completed in 1967. Other proposed plans for the site at the time included building a heliport and a garbage dump.
