= Letsgomoose =

Letsgomoose is a proposed commuter rail system for the Ottawa Capital Region of Canada. The driving force is the Moose Consortium, consisting of currently 11 businesses. It is intended not to rely on public subsidies but on a model called "Property-Powered Railway Open Market Development". Earlier studies were done in 2007.

The proposal looked at six commuter rail lines in the provinces of Ontario and Quebec running to Ottawa from Alexandria, Ontario; Smiths Falls, Ontario; Arnprior, Ontario; Bristol, Quebec (Pontiac Regional County Municipality), Wakefield, Quebec (La Pêche), and Montebello, Quebec. A key stone of the service to Wakefield and Montebello would have been the Chief William Commanda Bridge (formerly Prince of Wales Bridge) between Ottawa with its neighbouring city, Gatineau, Quebec. However, the railway track leading to the bridge was abandoned. The bridge and nearby track is being converted into a pedestrian and bike trail, however Moose Corporation has said the track can run alongside a rehabilitated railway.

== See also ==
- Hull–Chelsea–Wakefield Railway
