= Duncan station =

Railway station in British Columbia, Canada

Duncan
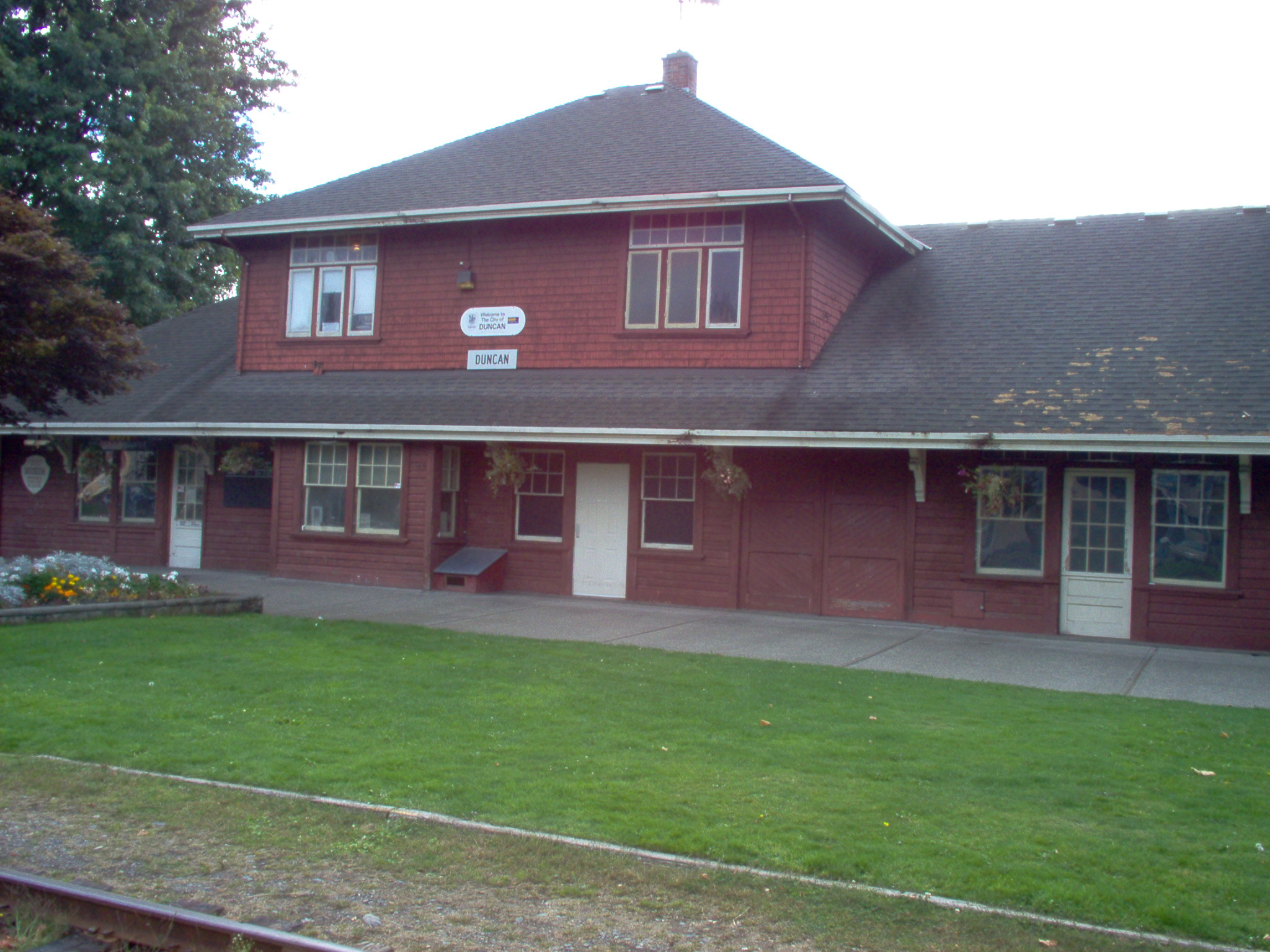
- The station in 2006, before it closed

General information
- Location: 120 Canada Way; Duncan, British Columbia; Canada
- Coordinates: 48°46′40″N 123°42′24″W
- Platforms: 1
- Tracks: 1

Construction
- Structure type: Train station
- Parking: Yes
- Cycle facilities: No

History
- Opened: 1886
- Closed: August 12, 2011

Former services
Preceding station	Via Rail	Following station
Hayward toward Courtenay	Victoria–Courtenay	Cowichan toward Victoria
Preceding station	Esquimalt and Nanaimo Railway	Following station
Somenos toward Courtenay	Main Line	Koksilah toward Victoria

Heritage Railway Station (Canada)
- Designated: 1993
- Reference no.: 15463
Location

The Duncan station in Duncan, British Columbia was a stop on Via Rail's Dayliner service, which has been indefinitely suspended since 2011. It is located on the Southern Railway of Vancouver Island mainline.

== History ==
The current station building was built in 1912 by the Esquimalt and Nanaimo Railway, replacing the original station which extended somewhat further south. "Duncan's Crossing Station" was established at Duncan's Crossing, named after William Chalmers Duncan, who farmed in the region. On March 4, 1912 the City of Duncan was incorporated.

The station was designated a Heritage Railway Stations in 1993.

== Closing ==
Duncan Station closed on March 19, 2011, when Via Rail suspended service indefinitely due to poor track conditions and was replaced with a bus service operated by Via Rail. On August 12, 2011, the bus service ended with station closing.

The station is now used as the site of the Cowichan Valley Museum.

== See also ==
- List of designated heritage railway stations of Canada
