= Wellington station (British Columbia) =

Railway station in British Columbia, Canada

Wellington

General information
- Location: Wellington Road & Jingle Pot Road; Wellington, BC; Canada
- Coordinates: 49.2069°N 124.0172°W
- Line: Victoria – Courtenay train

Construction
- Structure type: none

History
- Opened: 1888
- Closed: 2011

Former services
| Preceding station | Via Rail | Following station |
|---|---|---|
| Nanoose Bay toward Courtenay | Victoria–Courtenay | Nanaimo toward Victoria |
| Preceding station | Esquimalt and Nanaimo Railway | Following station |
| Nanoose toward Courtenay | Main Line | Northfield toward Victoria |
Location

The Wellington station located in the Wellington area of Nanaimo, British Columbia, was a flag stop on Via Rail's Dayliner service, which ended in 2011. The station is on the Southern Railway of Vancouver Island mainline. The station was named after the town of Wellington which formed around and next to the Wellington Colliery which was named after Arthur Wellesley, 1st Duke of Wellington, a leading British military and political figure in the 19th century.

== History ==
Wellington station is one of the oldest and most historic stops on the Southern Railway of Vancouver Island Mainline.

=== Wellington station before the E&N ===
Before the E&N railway was extended to Wellington, the Wellington stop was part of the Wellington Colliery Railway line joining Wellington's Departure Bay wharf operations with the Wellington Colliery operations scattered around Wellington. The current flagstop site and siding, still in use today, are where the Wellington Colliery's scale was located for weighing the coal the miner's produced. It was this scale and siding which was the unlikely catalyst for Wellington Colliery's first bitter miner strike which served to entrench a tone of mistrust and bitterness amongst workers which quickly escalated future confrontations in Wellington, and persisted for decades across Vancouver Island as Wellington miners moved to new towns being built up by the railway and coal industry.

=== Precursor and enabling the E&N ===
The Wellington Flag stop Station and siding are also the last remnant of the Wellington Colliery Railway which was both a precursor, catalyst and heavy user of the E&N, with the Wellington Colliery eventually being wholly replaced by the E&N. It was the Wellington Colliery Railway and mines which provided Robert Dunsmuir with the wealth, experience and infrastructure he needed to convince the government, under generous terms, to allow him to build an Island Railway.

=== E&N early years ===
In 1887, less than a year after completing the E&N railway, Robert Dunsmuir extended the E&N Railway north to Wellington, connecting up with the Wellington Colliery Railway lines. Wellington was changed from being Mile 77 to Mile 0, and remained the northern terminus of the E&N railway until 1910. Wellington Station was one of the busiest on the E&N route in the 1890s as the town's coal production surged in tandem with its population. With Wellington now connected to the E&N, Dunsmuir proceeded to move most of his shipping operations from Departure Bay to the deep water harbour of Oyster Bay, now known as Ladysmith. Dunsmuir died in 1889 and his family continued the coal and railway businesses until the E&N was sold to Canadian Pacific in 1905. By 1900 major coal mining operations had ceased around Wellington and coupled with the relocation of many of Dunsmuir's company buildings to Ladysmith followed by destructive town fire, traffic at the Wellington station dwindled. During the early 20th century Wellington Station was primarily used by the railway workers themselves as the station had a Roundhouse and a heavy mechanic shop for servicing the steam locomotives was based in Wellington as part of the Wellington Colliery Railway legacy. For many years a steam tower servicing the steam locomotives was also near the current flagstop. In the early-mid-20th century the heavy mechanics work was relocated to Victoria and Wellington become a minor stop on the E&N which had been expanded further North and West.

=== Modern ===
The old Wellington Station shut down in the late 1950s, and sat neglected for years. In 1966, the building was purchased by the Wellington Centennial Committee from the CPR, and moved to the southeast corner of Pioneer Park. Plans to restore the building and integrate it into the park were never completed, and the building was condemned and demolished, with salvageable material being incorporated into the Nanaimo Hornets Rugby Clubhouse, which was completed in 1979.

The current flagstop is a few hundred feet south of the original station and colliery weigh scale and is marked with a simple sign.
