= Nanaimo station (Via Rail) =

Railway station in British Columbia, Canada

Nanaimo
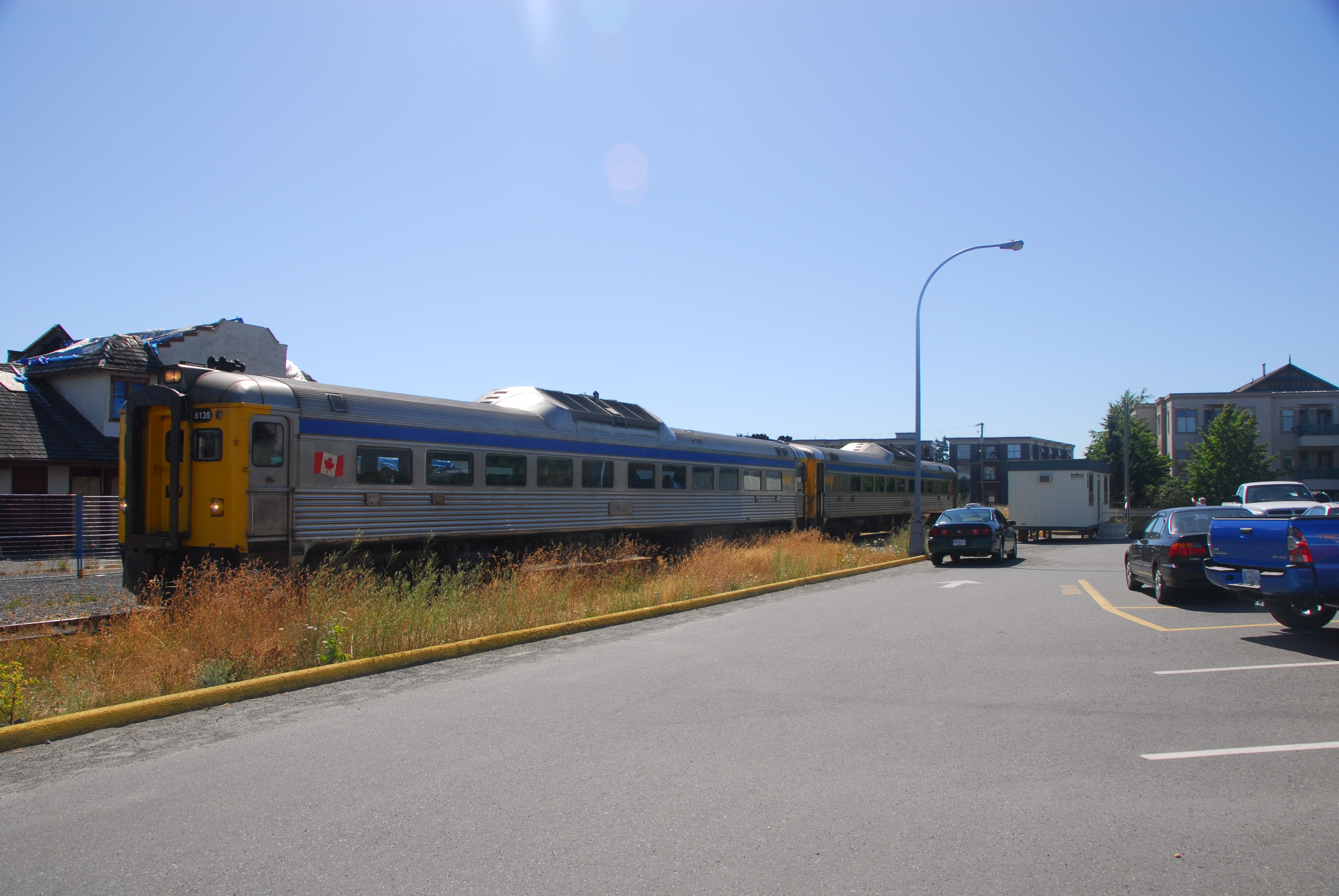
- Nanaimo Station with a Budd RDC in 2009, before closure.

General information
- Location: 336 Prideaux Street; Nanaimo, British Columbia; Canada
- Coordinates: 49.1638°N 123.9424°W
- Platforms: 1
- Tracks: 1

Construction
- Structure type: Railway station
- Parking: Yes
- Cycle facilities: No
- Accessible: Yes

History
- Opened: January 1, 1920; 106 years ago
- Closed: August 12, 2011; 15 years ago

Former services
Preceding station	Via Rail	Following station
Wellington toward Courtenay	Victoria–Courtenay	Starks toward Victoria
Preceding station	Esquimalt and Nanaimo Railway	Following station
Northfield toward Courtenay	Main Line	Starks toward Victoria
Location

Nanaimo station is a former railway station in Nanaimo, British Columbia, Canada. The station was a stop on the Via Rail Dayliner service, which closed indefinitely in 2011. The station is located at 336 Prideaux Street, Nanaimo.

== History ==
Nanaimo station was the original northern terminus of the E&N railway when the line entered service in 1886. By the following year the line was extended north to Wellington, which became the new terminus. The current one/two-storey stucco and wood building station building featuring a central square tower, was built in 1920 to replace an earlier station building. The building is a more complex version of the CPR Standard Plan No. 9 design. The original design was intended to support commercial operations on the main floor with living quarters for railway employees on the second floor.

== Closure ==
On March 19, 2011, Via Rail suspended service indefinitely due to poor track conditions on the line outside Nanaimo and replaced it with a bus service. Eventually, on August 12, 2011, the bus service ended and the station closed indefinitely.
