= Ladysmith station =

Railway station in British Columbia, Canada

Ladysmith
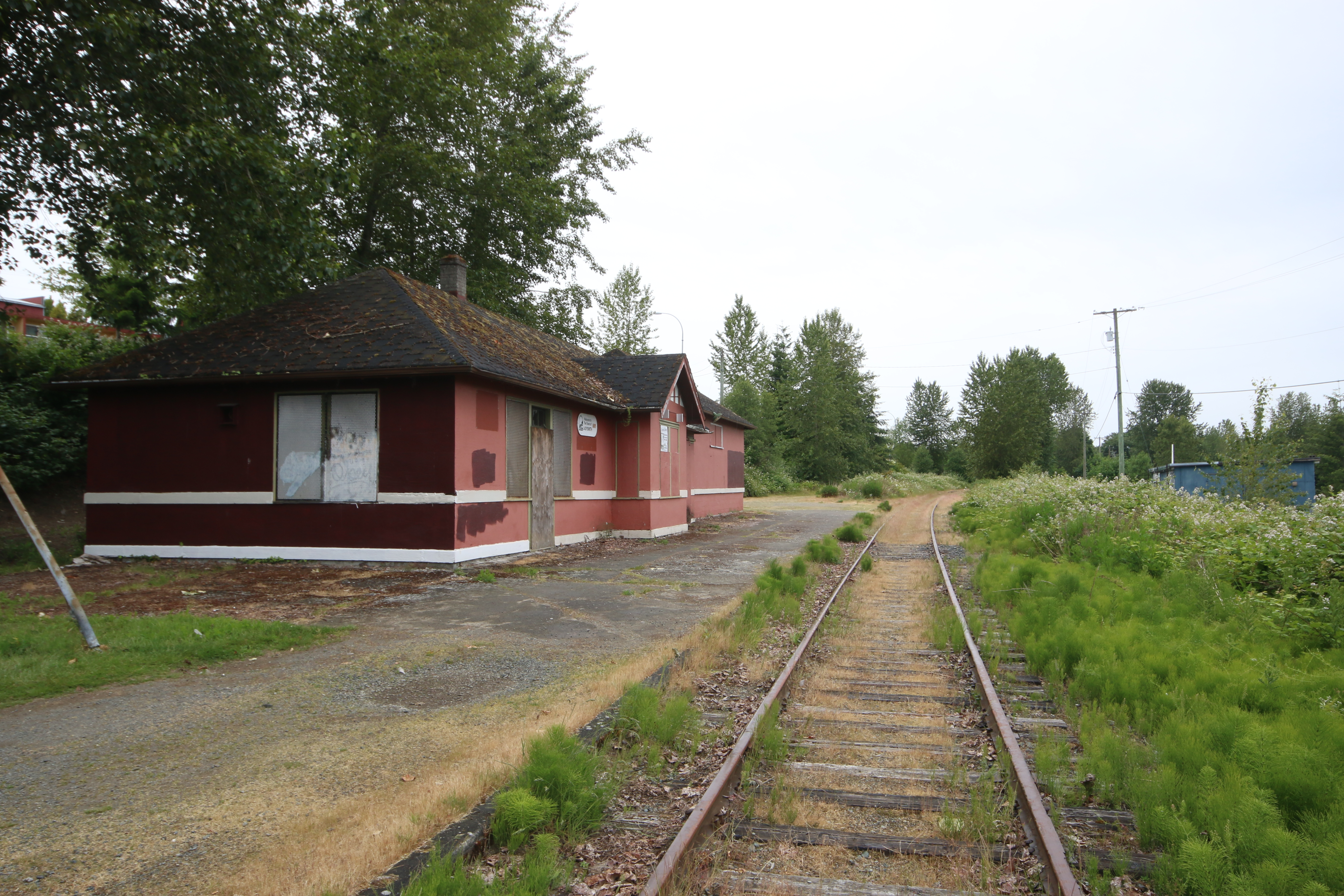
- The station as it appeared in 2018.

General information
- Location: Ladysmith, BC, Canada
- Coordinates: 48°59′41″N 123°48′57″W
- System: inter-city rail

Construction
- Structure type: Unstaffed heated station

History
- Closed: 2011

Former services
Preceding station	Via Rail	Following station
Cassidy toward Courtenay	Victoria–Courtenay	Chemainus toward Victoria
Preceding station	Esquimalt and Nanaimo Railway	Following station
Cassidy toward Courtenay	Main Line	Saltair toward Victoria
Location

Ladysmith station is a former railway station in Ladysmith, British Columbia. It was a flag stop on Via Rail's Dayliner service, from 1979 to 2011. While the station's condition has deteriorated significantly since service was indefinitely suspended, volunteers continue to perform basic maintenance the station as of September 2019.
