= Robert Swanson =

Robert Swanson may refer to:

- Bob Swanson (1912–1940), American race car driver
- Robert Swanson (inventor) (1905–1994), Canadian whistle inventor
- Robert A. Swanson (1947–1999), American venture capitalist and co-founder of Genentech
- Robert H. Swanson, American entrepreneur, co-founder of Linear Technology
