= E&N Rail Trail =

Rail trail in British Columbia, Canada

The E&N Rail Trail is a 17 km (11 mi) paved bike and pedestrian trail designed to be a non-motorized recreation and commuter connection to downtown Victoria, British Columbia, Canada and runs through Esquimalt, View Royal, and Langford. The E&N Rail Trail was also designed to connect with existing popular trail systems such as the Galloping Goose Regional Trail or Lochside Regional Trail. The trail lays alongside a suspended yet active rail line (Southern Railway of Vancouver Island or SVI). The trail is named for SVI's predecessor Esquimalt and Nanaimo Railway.

== Construction ==
Construction started in 2009, and planned as a multiphased construction throughout the region. The projected cost of the project is estimated at $36,000,000. Primary funding of this project come from the Canadian federal government through the following contributions:

- Regionally Significant Projects, Strategic Priorities Gas Tax ($14 million)
- Western Economic Diversification Fund ($1 million)
- Bike BC ($2.7 million)
- Local Motion ($275,000)
- All other remaining costs covered by the Capital Regional District ($2.2 million)

Construction of this trail was managed by CRD Regional Parks and CRD Environmental Engineering in partnership with Victoria, Esquimalt, View Royal, Langford, Songhees First Nation and Esquimalt First Nation. The Province of British Coulmbia and Island Corridor Foundation are also construction partners in this project.
