= Robert Swanson (inventor) =

Canadian inventor (1905–1994)

- Robert Swanson with the Heritage Horns.
- Born: Robert Eugene Swanson; 1905
- Died: 1994 (aged 88 or 89)
- Occupations: Engineer, Railway Inspector, Business owner, Poet
- Known for: Whistles, horns, poetry

Robert Swanson (1905–1994) was a Canadian researcher and developer, and is credited with the invention of the first five and six-chime air horns for use on locomotives. Swanson had worked as the chief engineer of a company called Victoria Lumber Manufacturing in the 1920s, when he developed a hobby for making steam whistles for locomotives. Eventually, Swanson designed and built a large steam whistle for the mill where he worked. He also built the Heritage Horns that were on the old BC Hydro building that play the first four chords of "O Canada" at noon every day. The horns are now on the roof of the Pan Pacific hotel at Canada Place.

Later, Swanson, the son of Alfred Swanson, worked as the chief inspector of railroads for the province of British Columbia. It was here he met his future partner, Don Challenger, who operated a logging company. The two knew each other through the logging industry, which relied heavily on rail transportation at the time.

Swanson published four books of verse between 1942 and 1953, and also a book of logging stories, Whistle Punks and Widow-Makers, which appeared in 1993. Known as the "bard of the woods", he wrote ballads of logging on the British Columbia coast, taking the advice of Robert Service, who noted that Swanson had traveled extensively through the camps and no one else was writing about that type of life. Swanson read the poems on his weekly talk show on radio station CJOR. The chapbooks of the verses were designed to fit in racks meant for issues of Reader's Digest, found in every camp commissary. Mainly distributed through the Harry Smith News Agency, the ballads were immensely popular in bunkhouses, reputedly selling 82,000 copies. Although Swanson was never accepted by the literary establishment, his books easily outsold those of better known poets of the 1940s such as Earle Birney and Dorothy Livesay. In the 1980s, he was part of a troupe that read and sang literature about logging. Forestry authority Ken Drushka recalled that going on a reading tour with Swanson was like travelling with an "octagenarian rock star".

Swanson was the driving force behind the restoration of the Royal Hudson, supported by the New Democratic Party and Dave Barrett. However, Grace McCarthy attempted to take credit for the idea.

Swanson was a qualified locomotive engineer, stationary engineer, professional mechanical engineer as well as chief inspector for the BC provincial department of railways. As chief inspector, he wrote the provincial "Boiler Code" in 1948, and he required that all locomotives running on British Columbia provincially regulated railways be equipped with a five-note whistle, rather than the three-note whistle requirement for federally regulated railway locomotives.

Before his death, he was an active member of the Ladysmith Railway Society. Many artifacts this society acquired were the direct result of his enthusiasm. Vancouver Island, and in particular Nanaimo and Ladysmith were his particular areas of activity. His whistle test station was on Nanaimo Lakes Road where he serenaded neighbours for miles around.

== Books ==
- Swanson, Robert E. (July 1942). Rhymes of a western rambler: a book of verse, written mainly about the Great Northwest and the people therein. Vancouver: Mimeographed by Beatrice Parker.
- Swanson, Robert E. (1942). Rhymes of a western logger : a book of verse concerning the trials and tribulations, lives and ways of the loggers living and working in the great Northwest of America. Vancouver: Lumberman Printing Co. Ltd.
- Swanson, Robert E. (1943). Rhymes of a lumberjack. A second book of verse concerning the trials and tribulations, lives and ways of the loggers living and working in the great Northwest of America. Toronto: Thomas Allen, Limited.
- Swanson, Robert E. (1945). Bunkhouse ballads, a third book of verse concerning the trials and tribulations, lives and ways of that red-blooded, outdoor breed of men who have built the great Northwest of America. Toronto: Thomas Allen, Limited.
- Swanson, Robert E.; Swanson, Dan A (1953). Swanson's rhymes of a haywire hooker. Vancouver: Lumberman Printing Co.
- Swanson, Robert E. (1992). Rhymes of a western logger: the collected poems of Robert Swanson. Foreword by Howard White. Madeira Park, B.C.: Harbour Publishing. ISBN 9781550170665.
- Swanson, Robert E. (1993). Whistle punks & widow-makers: tales of the B.C. woods. With Ken Drushka. Madeira Park, B.C.: Harbour Publishing. ISBN 9781550170900.

== See also ==
- Ladysmith railway station
