= Cisco Bridges =

CNR Cisco Bridge
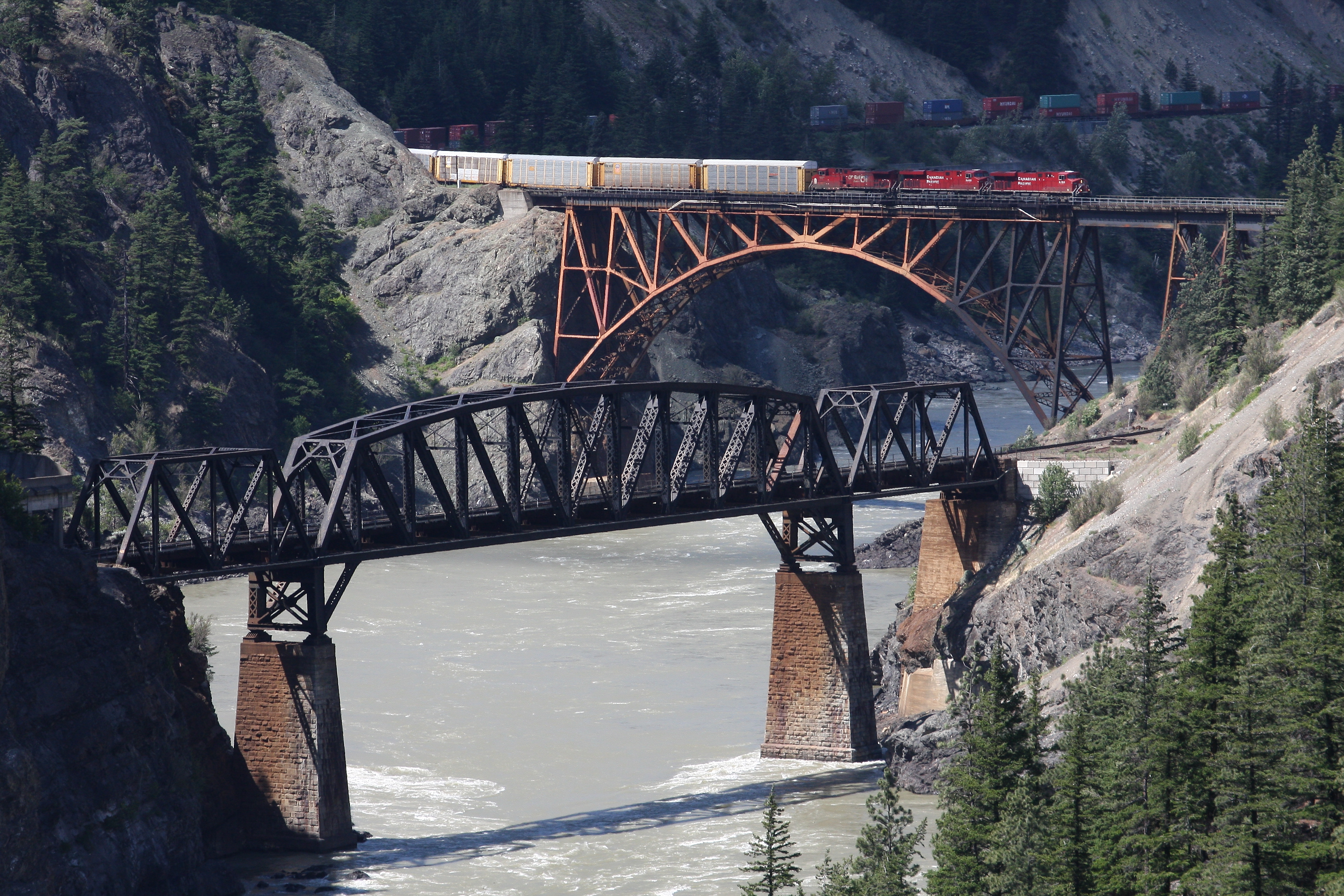
- CPR bridge (black) in foreground, CNR bridge (orange arch) in background (with CPR train on it). Photo facing upriver.
- Coordinates: 50.151505°N 121.581114°W
- Carries: Canadian National Railway
- Crosses: Fraser River
- Locale: Siska, BC

Characteristics
- Design: truss arch bridge
- Total length: 247 m
- Height: 67 m

Location
- Interactive map of CNR Cisco Bridge

CPR Cisco Bridge
- Coordinates: 50.148535°N 121.5784°W
- Carries: Canadian Pacific Railway
- Crosses: Fraser River
- Locale: Siska, BC

Characteristics
- Design: truss bridge
- Total length: 160 m

Location
- Interactive map of CPR Cisco Bridge

The Cisco Bridges are a pair of railroad bridges at Siska (historically known as Cisco) near Lytton, British Columbia, Canada. The Canadian Pacific Railway and Canadian National Railway both follow the route of the Fraser River, one on each side, and the routes exchange sides at this point. The easier CPR route was laid first; when the CNR arrived later they needed to follow the more difficult route. The area is popular with railfans due to the proximity of the two bridges (which allows both bridges to be taken in one photograph, sometimes with a train on each bridge simultaneously), and the easy access to the area (the Trans-Canada Highway, BC Hwy 1) is parallel to both bridges down the east bank of the river. Directional running in the Fraser Canyon means that both CPR and CNR trains may be seen on both bridges. Although this area is generally known as Cisco, the actual CN timetable station point of Cisco is approximately 4.0 km (2.5 mi) to the east of the bridges.

== Canadian National Railway ==
The Canadian National bridge is a truss arch bridge, 247 metres (810 ft) long and 67 metres (220 ft) high. The north-west end of the bridge abuts into a near-vertical rock face. The south-east end of the bridge crosses the CPR tracks about 100 metres (330 ft) north of the CPR bridge.

== Canadian Pacific Railway ==
The Canadian Pacific bridge is a 3-span, 160-metre-long (520 ft) truss bridge. There are two short Pratt truss spans at each end of the longer Parker truss main span. The south end of the bridge (on the west bank of the river) enters directly into the Cantilever Bar Tunnel, in the side of the Cisco Bluff.

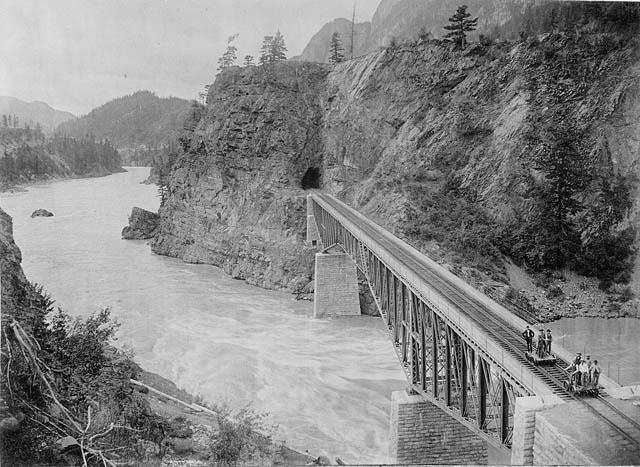
The original CPR Cisco Bridge, c. 1900. Cantilever Bar Tunnel in background. Photo facing downriver.

The original span was built by Joseph Tomlinson and was pre-fabricated in England and shipped to Canada in 1883. The bridge – then one of the longest cantilever spans in North America – was then constructed by the San Francisco Bridge Company. When the current bridge was built at Cisco in 1910, the original span was moved to the Esquimalt and Nanaimo Railway on Vancouver Island to cross the Niagara Creek Canyon (48.4825°N 123.5574°W), where it is still in use (now by the Southern Railway of Vancouver Island).

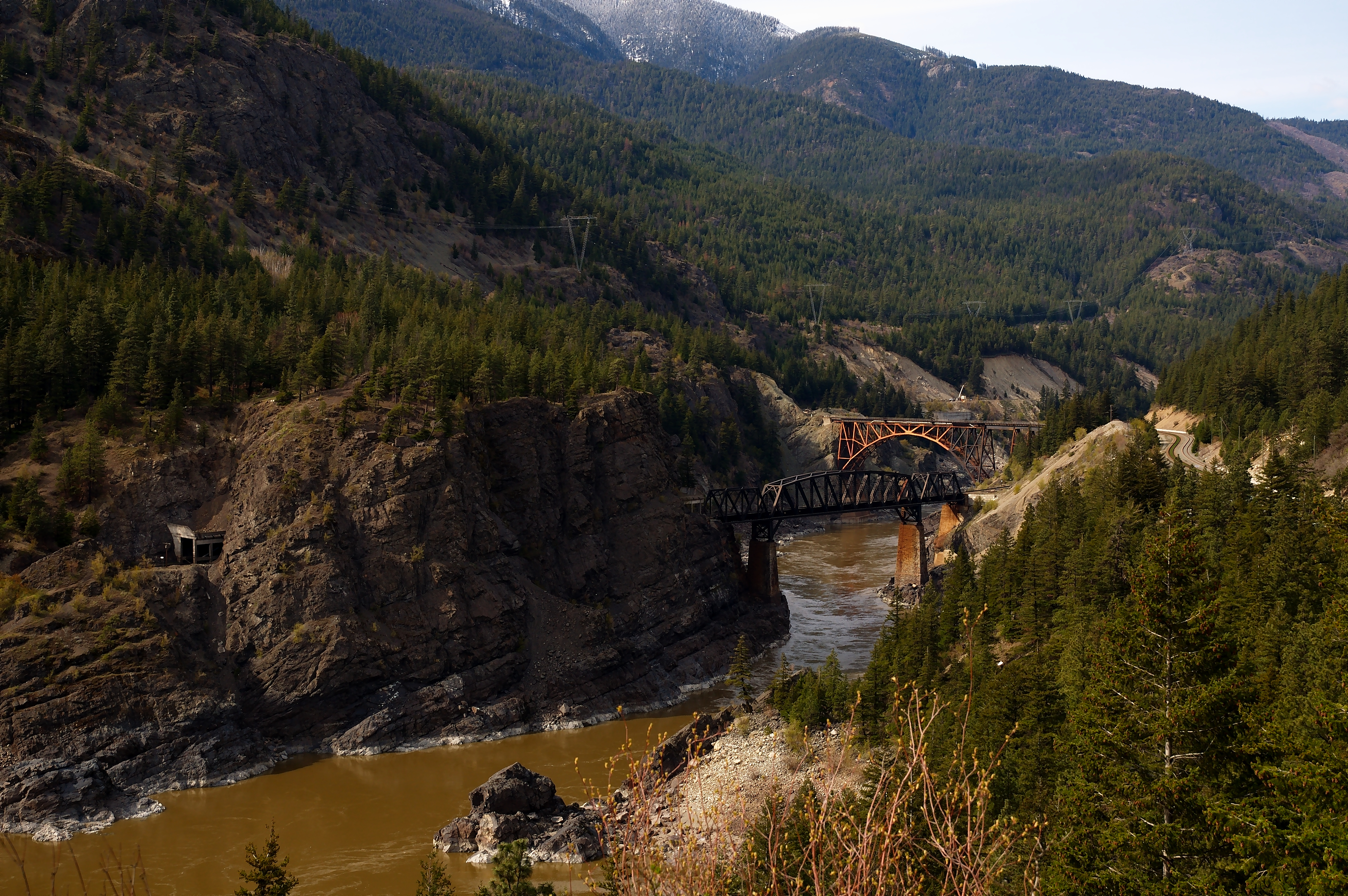
Wide view of area showing full length of CPR tunnel from left end of black bridge in centre to left edge of photo. Photo facing upriver.

== See also ==
- List of crossings of the Fraser River
- List of bridges in Canada
