= Island Corridor Foundation =

The Island Corridor Foundation (ICF) is a Canadian non-profit that owns former Canadian Pacific, RailAmerica, and Esquimalt & Nanaimo Railway (E&N) track on Vancouver Island in British Columbia. The foundation was created in 2003 and gained the first track in 2006 when Canadian Pacific donated its portion of the line to ICF. Later that year, RailAmerica also donated its portion to the foundation, leaving ICF in control of the entire existing right of way. Southern Railway of British Columbia, part of the Washington Companies, was selected in 2006 as the exclusive operator on the track using the name Southern Railway of Vancouver Island. SRVI operated the freight trains and Via Rail's Victoria – Courtenay train.

The Island Corridor Foundation is a partnership of the various local governments and First Nations communities along the railway, including 14 municipalities, 5 regional districts and 12 First Nations territories.

== See also ==
- Island Rail Corridor
