= Siska, British Columbia =

Coordinates: 50.14996°N 121.5792°W

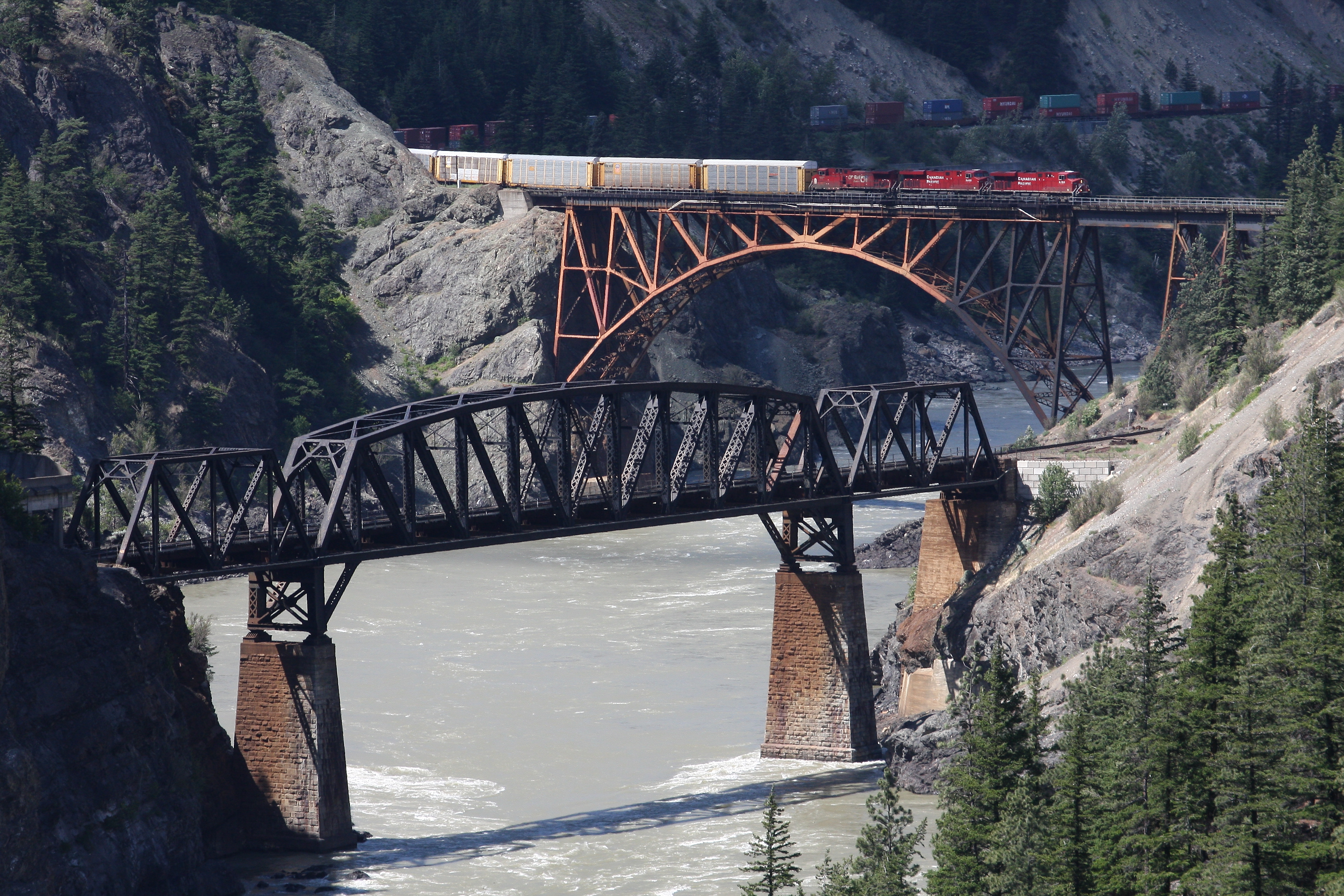
The Cisco Bridges, the main landmark at Siska; CPR in foreground, CNR in background

Siska, also known historically as Cisco, is a locality in the Fraser Canyon, 9.4 kilometres south of the town of Lytton, British Columbia, Canada. It is at Siska that the Canadian Pacific and Canadian National Railways switch from one side of the river to the other, because it is impossible for both rail lines to occupy the same bank of the Fraser, due to the narrow and steep terrain. The resulting pair of bridges, with the CNR bridge just upstream of the CPR's, and the CPR's bridge's west foot entering the Cantilever Bar Tunnel into the side of Cisco Bluff, remains one of the most famous images of the CPR's route through British Columbia today and is easily viewable from the adjacent Trans-Canada Highway.

Siska is also home to the Siska First Nation, a local government of the Nlaka'pamux peoples who have lived in the Fraser Canyon for thousands of years. The Siska First Nation rancherie - main residential area - is just off the highway on a broad benchland just below the CPR bridge, and has a general store, the museum and band office, plus other band services. One of the band's economic ventures, a project in applied ethnobotany intended to use traditional knowledge to help preserve the land against logging extraction through economic competition for forest leases, is the nurturing and harvesting of traditional food and other plant materials in the surrounding wilderness, made into health and bath products and teas and other products.

Siska is the northernmost point in the Fraser Canyon where bigleaf maple is found. Other vegetation is noticeably denser than at Lytton, part of the transition from dry Interior to coast rainforest ecotypes that begins near Siska and is largely complete at Spuzzum.
