= Raven coal mine =

Proposed mining project in British Columbia, Canada

The Raven coal mine is a proposed mining project in British Columbia undergoing a joint federal/provincial review. It involves Compliance Energy Corp (a small Canadian mining company) and partners Itochu Corporation (Japan) and LG International (Korea). It is also known as the "Comox Joint Venture".

It involves 31 square kilometres underground on Vancouver Island between Beaufort Mountains and Baynes Sound and 2 km^{2} surface works 4.2 km southwest of Buckley Bay in upper Cowie Creek.

The initial environmental assessment application was rejected by the BC Environmental Assessment Office in May 2013 for containing insufficient information. Compliance Energy resubmitted an application in early 2015, but withdrew it in March 2015, just as the Environmental Assessment Office was set to rule on whether the proposal met the conditions to proceed to a full review and public hearing. The federal and provincial environmental assessments of the project were subsequently terminated in 2016.
