= Johnson Street Bridge =

Bridges in Victoria, British Columbia, Canada

- Coordinates: 48.428061°N 123.371594°W
- Carries: 3 lanes of Esquimalt Road
- Locale: Victoria, British Columbia

Characteristics
- Design: Single-leaf rolling bascule
- Longest span: 46 m (151 ft)

History
- Opened: 31 March 2018

Location
- Interactive map of Johnson Street Bridge

The Johnson Street Bridge is a bascule bridge spanning the Victoria Harbour in Victoria, British Columbia. Four known bridges have spanned the narrows between Victoria's Inner Harbour and Upper Harbour, connecting Johnson Street on the east shore with Esquimalt Road on the west shore. The current bridge is Canada's largest single-leaf bascule bridge. It carries three vehicular traffic lanes, with a pedestrian walkway on its south side, and a multi-use pathway on its north side. The bridge is lit with blue LED lighting as a homage to its predecessor, which was referred to as the "Blue Bridge". It is one of only two road drawbridges on Vancouver Island, the other being the 17th Street Bridge in Courtenay.

== History ==
=== First bridge, 1855–1862 ===
The first bridge connecting the west and east shores of the Victoria Harbour was a low wagon bridge, completed in 1855. The bridge blocked marine traffic, and was ultimately dismantled seven years later in 1862 and replaced with a ferry service.

=== Second bridge, 1888–1923 ===
A second bridge, for rail and foot traffic only, was constructed in 1888. This hand-operated swing bridge of limited load capacity was in operation until 1923.

=== Third bridge, 1924–2018 ===
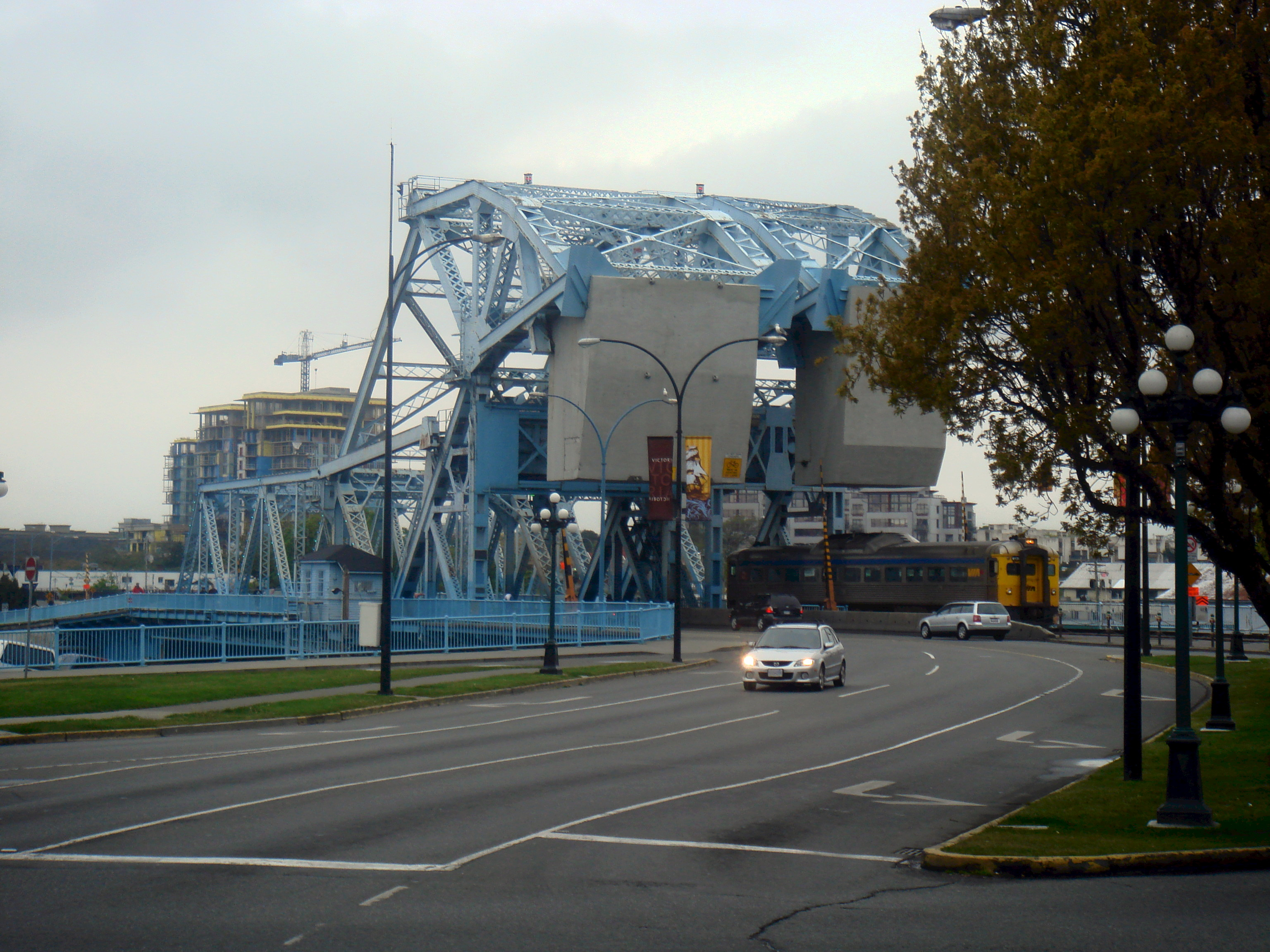
Via Rail Dayliner train crossing the Johnson Street Bridge after completing a Victoria-Courtenay round trip, May 13, 2008

The third Johnson Street Bridge, completed in 1924, was built as two adjacent, independent, heel trunnion bascule bridges. It later became referred to as the "Blue Bridge" or "Old Blue", after it was painted a light blue colour following corrosion repairs in the late 1970s.

==== Background and construction ====
The third Johnson Street Bridge was designed under the direction of city engineer Mr. F. M. Preston in 1920. The Strauss Bascule Bridge Company, which held the patents on the design, prepared the plans for the 45 m (148 ft) bascule spans and the operating machinery. The superstructure of the bridge was fabricated in Walkerville, Ontario of 100 tons of steel. The sub-structure was built by the City of Victoria Engineering Department and required 9,144 cubic metres (11,960 cubic yards) of concrete. The bridge was constructed to carry a three-lane road span of 350 long tons (392 short tons; 356 t), and a single-track rail span of 150 long tons (168 short tons; 152 t). The approaches were fixed steel girders; the east was 34 m (112 ft) and the west was 22 m (72 ft). Counterweights were made of hollow concrete weighing 780 long tons (870 short tons; 790 t). Its operating struts were moved by pinions powered by 56-kilowatt (75 hp) electric motors. The bridge was completed at a cost of $918,000 (27 percent higher than the estimated cost of $720,000) and opened in January 1924.

==== Modifications and use ====
The bridge originally had street car rails running down the center of the road span, but they were never used, and were removed a few years after opening. In 1966, the wood deck was replaced with steel grid, as rainwater absorbed by the deck unbalanced the bridge, straining the lifting gear. In 1979, extensive repairs were made to the superstructure, which had become severely corroded. Following these repairs, the bridge was painted blue. The paint was selected because the oxides of its pigment are the same colour as the paint so that little fading of the colour occurs. The City of Victoria had used the same blue paint for the lamp standards throughout the city.

In 1995, abnormally high temperatures caused the steel decking to expand to the point the bridge would not open or close properly. This necessitated the removal of about 25 mm (1 in) of the decking.

Daily traffic in 2010 was 30,000 trips a day at peak usage, of which 4000 were pedestrians, 3000 cyclists, and 23,000 vehicles. Until 2011, the rail span for the E&N Railway was used twice a day by the Via Rail Dayliner, for trips up Vancouver Island towards Duncan, Nanaimo and Courtenay.

==== Condition assessment ====
On April 2, 2009, the preliminary results of an overall condition assessment of the Johnson Street Bridge were presented to Victoria City Council. Given the seismic vulnerability of the existing bridge, combined with its heavy use and high volumes of traffic, it was recommended that the bridge either undergo a seismic retrofit or full replacement within 2 to 3 years. After a detailed presentation by City Engineering staff and Delcan engineering consultants, and lengthy discussion by council, the city council gave approval-in-principle on April 23, 2009 to replace the 85-year-old Johnson Street Bridge.

=== Development of a replacement bridge ===
On July 9, 2009, Victoria City Council asked staff to proceed with pursuing a design-build model and developing terms of reference for an advisory panel of community representatives to participate in the Johnson Street Bridge Replacement Project. Later that month, seven residents of Greater Victoria were named to the Johnson Street Bridge Citizen Advisory Committee and City Council awarded the Owner's Representative contract to MMM Group Limited to project manage the replacement of the 85-year-old bascule bridge. Victoria City Council was presented on September 8, 2009 with three design concepts for the replacement Johnson Street Bridge. On September 24, 2009, City Council decided on the Rolling Bascule Bridge as the design for the new bridge after reviewing public feedback, recommendations from the Citizens Advisory Committee, and advice from a staff technical committee. On November 19, 2009, the city council voted in favour (4 in favour, 2 against and 2 absent) of an Alternate Approval Process to require a counter petition. If more than 10% of residents would oppose the borrowing bylaw, then the issue would go to a referendum. By the deadline on January 4, 2010, organizers presented a successful counter petition to City Hall, exceeding this 10% threshold.

During October and November 2009, the provincial government declined to contribute to funding the bridge project. A few weeks later the federal government approved a $21 million grant for the replacement project, funding of which came from the Build Canada Fund. In December 2009, a counter petition was launched to force the city to go to a referendum to obtain approval to borrow the further $42 million needed towards the $63 million total cost. In February 2010, the city commissioned MMM Group to prepare a full Class C report on comparable options for both replacement and rehabilitation.

On May 27, 2010, the results of an Ipsos-Reid survey were released, summarizing local resident priorities for the bridge. These priorities included having a dedicated pedestrian walkway, effective lifespan, acceptable cost, dedicated bike lanes, accessibility for other users (i.e., wheelchairs, scooters, strollers, visually impaired), and safety, above heritage value and having a rail crossing. Local business owners did not see a benefit from one bridge option over the other, but concerns over cost and construction issues including potential closures were noted.

On June 11, 2010, Banjar Management's Economic Impact Assessment identified economic benefits of the bridge. Negative economic impacts were assessed as follows:

- Downtown Victoria business impairment: Full closure, $10.3 million; one lane open, $5.1 million; two lanes open, $2.6 million
- Vehicle diversion travel time costs: Full closure, $1.6 million; one lane open, $1.0 million; two lanes open, $0.4 million
- Bus diversion costs over one year (two years): Transit Operation Cost, $0.5 million ($1.0 million); transit passenger travel time, $1.0 million ($2.0 million)

On June 14, 2010, MMM Engineering Group made a presentation to council of their report on the rehabilitation and replacement options, including updated cost estimates, revised timelines, and an economic impact study of potential closures and options for different levels of seismic upgrading ($6.5 million, vs. $8.5 million). Refurbishment, with seismic upgrades to $8.5 million as recommended in the report, and a third, new span to be a multi-use bridge, was estimated to cost $103 million. Replacement of the existing structure, with accompanying work on the approaches to the bridge, with priority given to a mix of users including vehicles, pedestrians and cyclists, was estimated to cost $89 million. The MMM Group study was also peer-reviewed by Stantec Consulting Ltd, Victoria, agreeing that the proposed new designs were appropriate, and that the projected costs of either rehabilitation or replacement were reasonable.

On June 17, the city council decided to ask other municipalities to help fund the costs of maintaining the rail link. This would reduce the cost of refurbishment by $23 million, and replacement by $12 million. Long-term planning for commuter rail to the western communities would be affected if the rail line no longer crossed into downtown Victoria, terminating instead in the Victoria West neighbourhood. The deadline for obtaining this funding was August 12, 2010. The city council also voted on this date to update the bridge to a seismic standard of 8.5 magnitude. Information packages and numbered surveys were sent out to all Victoria residents, inviting input up to the August 12 deadline. During the month of July, City of Victoria hosted 2 open houses and bridge tours to provide information on the projects to residents. City staff, engineers, and project managers were present to answer questions.

On August 12, 2010, Victoria city councillors voted to replace the Johnson Street Bridge, rather than refurbish the existing bridge. The vote was done after tours, open houses, and surveys were done to inform residents of Victoria of the options. An Ipsos-Reid survey found that 64% and 68% of residents and businesses respectively preferred replacing the bridge with a new one. On November 20, 2010 the referendum to support the city borrowing money for the cost of the new bridge passed 61% to 39%. The new bridge was scheduled to be completed in 2015, at which time the old bridge would be removed.

==== Closure of rail span ====
On March 31, 2011, the rail span was closed to rail traffic after a routine inspection found corrosion damage on key structural elements. A preliminary estimate of repair costs was $120,000. The railway span and approaches were removed in February 2012 to make room for the new bridge.

Rail freight service up Store St. to commercial properties on the east side of the Upper Harbour had been discontinued decades before. Since then, the line terminated at a small passenger station beside the bridge. Victoria–Courtenay passenger service was suspended indefinitely in March 2011 due to deteriorating track.

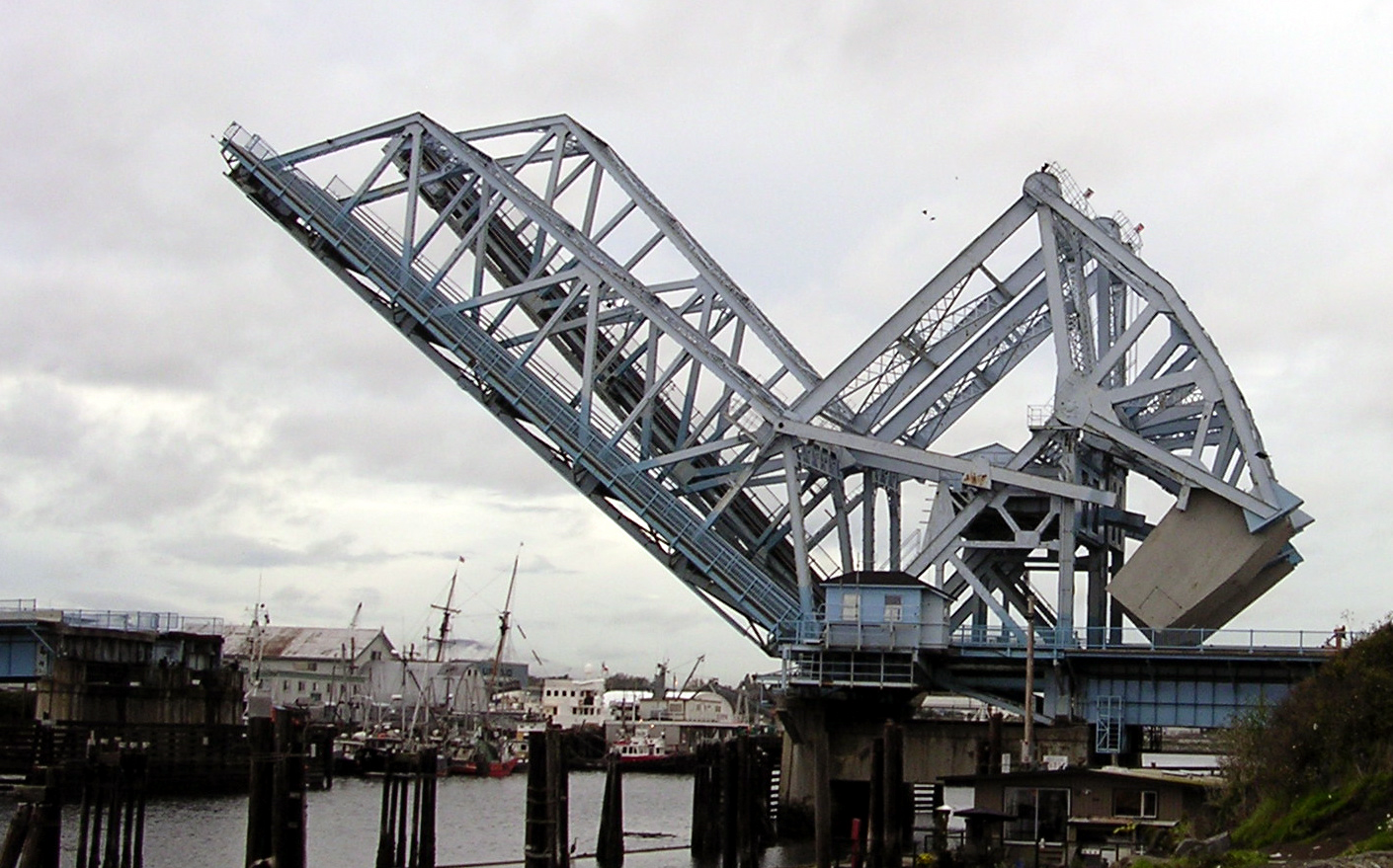
The third Johnson Street Bridge, or "Blue Bridge", closing

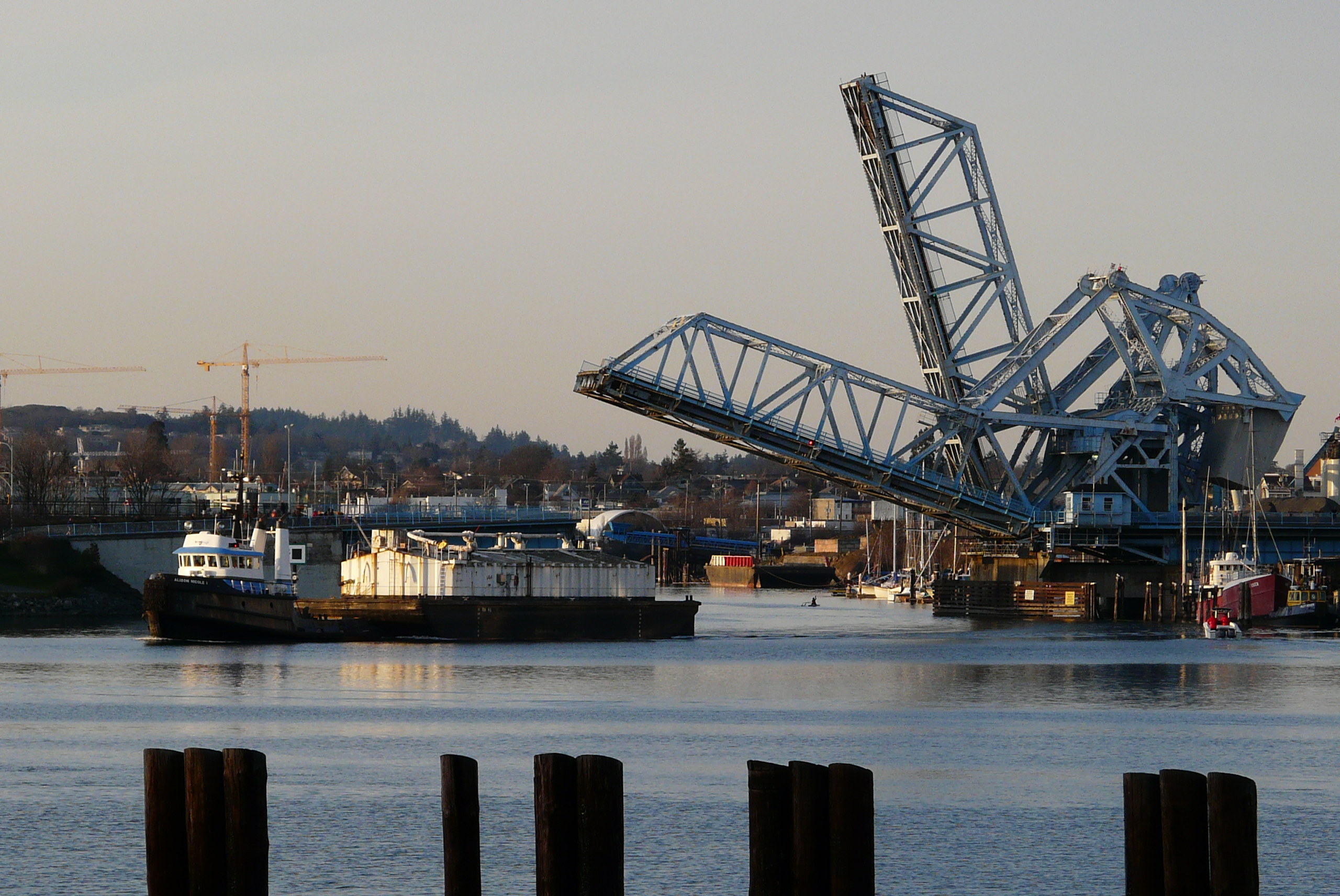
The Blue Bridge opening

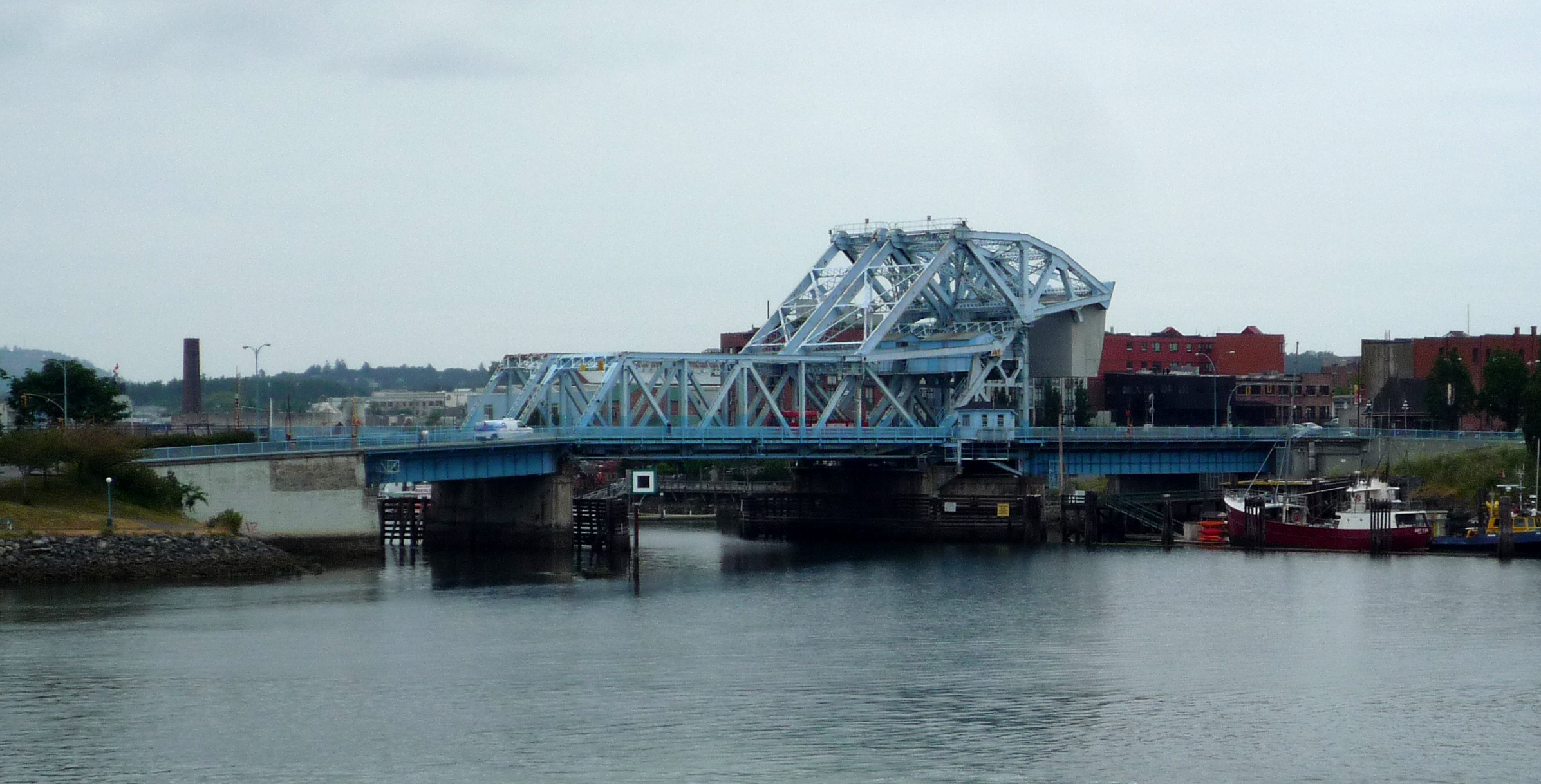
View of the Blue Bridge from the Harbour

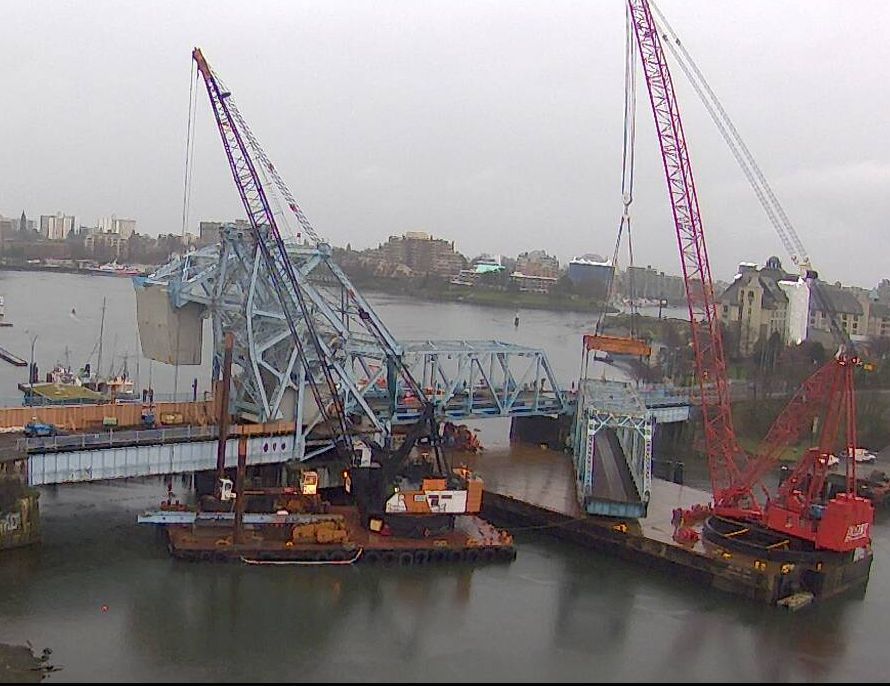
Removal of the third bridge's rail span

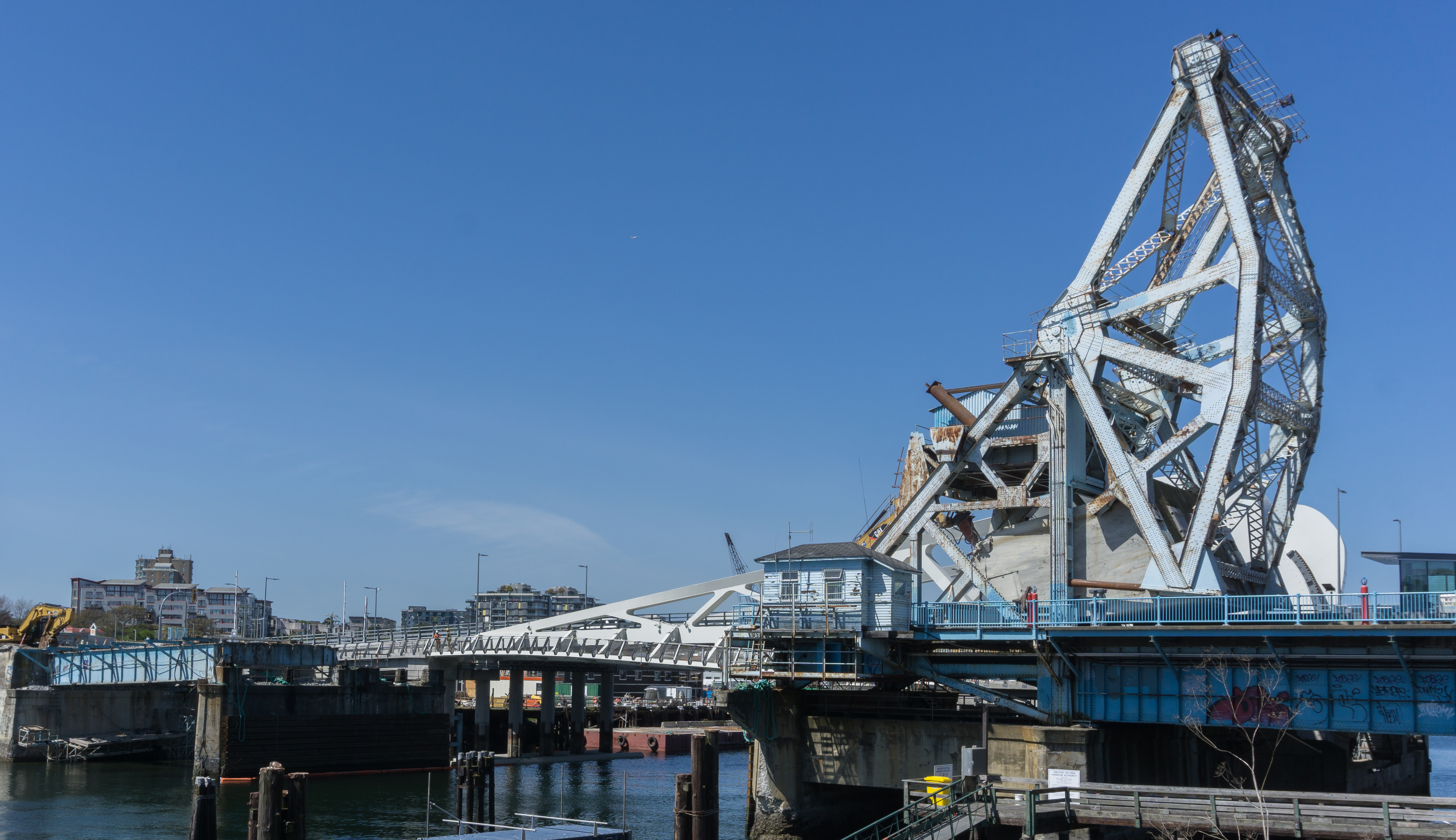
A photo of the Blue Bridge in front of the new Johnson Street Bridge, after removal of its road span

=== Fourth bridge, 2018–present ===
New Johnson Street Bridge at night after opening to traffic for the first time, March 31, 2018

Construction of a rolling bascule bridge beside the third bridge began in 2013, and opened to the public on March 31, 2018. On the same date, the road span of the third bridge was closed to pedestrian traffic, after being closed to vehicular traffic two days earlier. The closing and commissioning ceremony was attended by Victoria City Councillors, mayors from across the Capital Regional District, project managers and engineers for the new bridge, and members of the public. Finally, the road span and approaches of the third bridge were removed during spring 2018.

As of December 31, 2017, actual costs of $96.08 million had been incurred, to an approved budget of $105.06 million.

== Construction ==
The current Johnson Street Bridge took almost six years to complete, and was constructed on the north side of its predecessor. Road re-alignment began in 2011, nearly two years prior to the start of bridge construction. In late 2012, the contract was awarded to PCL Constructors Westcoast Inc.

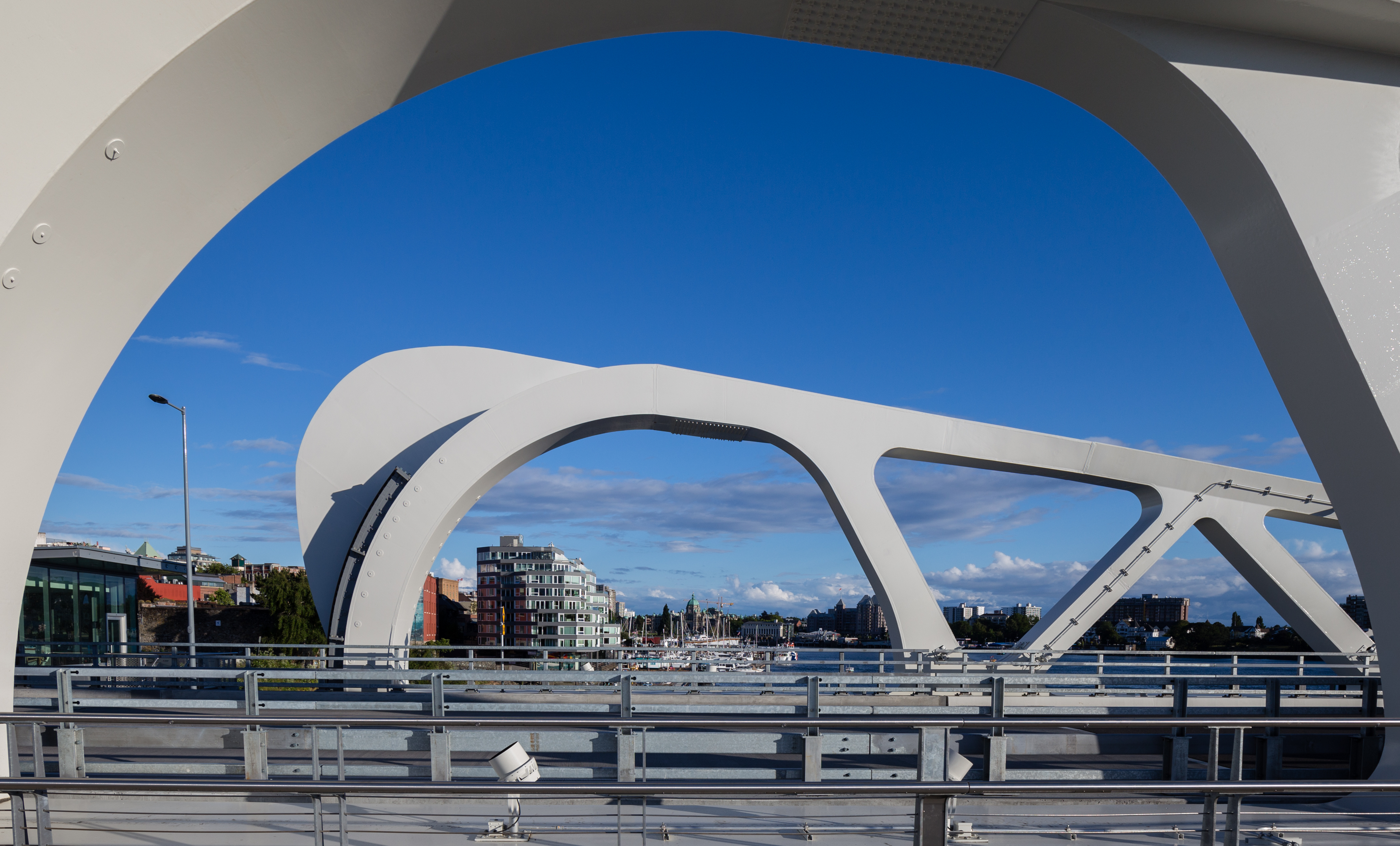
View south across the vehicle and pedestrian lanes of the Johnson Street Bridge.

After construction began in May, 2013, piles were driven to install temporary work platforms on the east and west sides of the channel. Construction of a cofferdam began on the west side of the bridge in September, and the first of the bridge's 16 caissons was installed in the harbour in late October. While steel fabrication began overseas in March, 2014, it was halted a few months later when form deficiencies were found following inspection. Steel fabrication resumed in March, 2015, with the first steel shipment finally taking place over a year later in August, 2017.

The bridge affords a three-lane roadway, a pedestrian walkway on the south side, and a multi-use pathway on the north side. Both the pedestrian walkway and multi-use path are cantilevered off of the main span and fully separated from vehicle traffic.

== See also ==
- Joseph Strauss (engineer)
- List of bascule bridges
- Point Ellice Bridge
- List of bridges in Canada
