= Victoria station (British Columbia) =

Railway station in British Columbia, Canada

Victoria
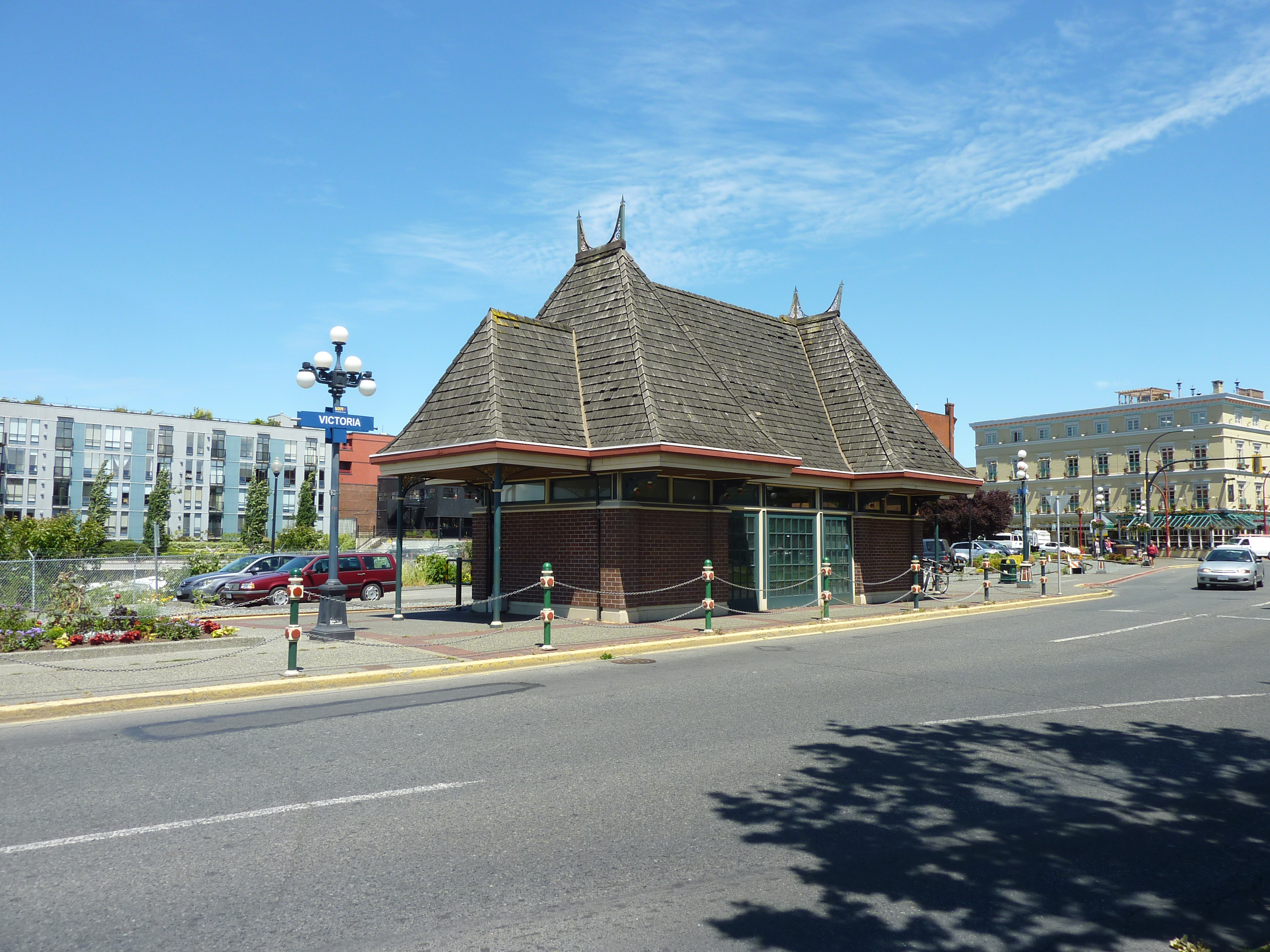
- The 1980s era station in 2011

General information
- Location: 450 Pandora Avenue; Victoria, British Columbia; Canada
- Coordinates: 48.4283°N 123.3706°W
- Platforms: 1
- Tracks: 1

Construction
- Structure type: Train station
- Parking: Yes
- Cycle facilities: No
- Accessible: Yes

Other information
- Status: Closed

History
- Opened: 1888
- Closed: August 12, 2011

Former services
Preceding station	Via Rail	Following station
Esquimalt toward Courtenay	Victoria–Courtenay	Terminus
Preceding station	Esquimalt and Nanaimo Railway	Following station
Russells toward Courtenay	Main Line	Terminus
Location
- Location within British Columbia Location within Canada

Victoria station was a railway station in Victoria, British Columbia, on the east end of the Johnson Street Bridge. The station opened in 1888, and was the southern terminus for Via Rail's Dayliner service which operated until 2011. The station closed on August 12, 2011.

== History ==
In 1886, the E&N Railway began operating from Esquimalt to Nanaimo. The station opened in 1888, following an extension from Esquimalt station to the station site.

In 1905, the E&N Railway was sold to the Canadian Pacific Railway. In 1979, Via Rail took over operation of the passenger services of CPR. The former station building was built in the 1980s.

== Closure ==
=== Suspension of service ===
On March 19, 2011, Via Rail suspended service indefinitely due to poor track conditions and replaced it with a bus service. Eventually, on August 12, 2011, bus service ended and the station closed.

=== Bridge replacement ===
As part of the Johnson Street Bridge replacement project, the rail bridge across the Inner Harbour was removed and the station dismantled. The station roof was eventually salvaged by the Greater Victoria Harbour Authority in 2012.

== Timeline ==
- 1905: E&N Railway sold to the CPR.
- March 19, 2011: Victoria–Courtenay service suspended.
- March 31, 2011: The rail portion of the bridge was closed.
- August 12, 2011: Temporary bus replacement discontinued, station officially closed.
- 2012: Station is dismantled for construction nearby and the Johnson Street Bridge project.
