= Victoria–Courtenay train =

Former VIA Rail service in British Columbia

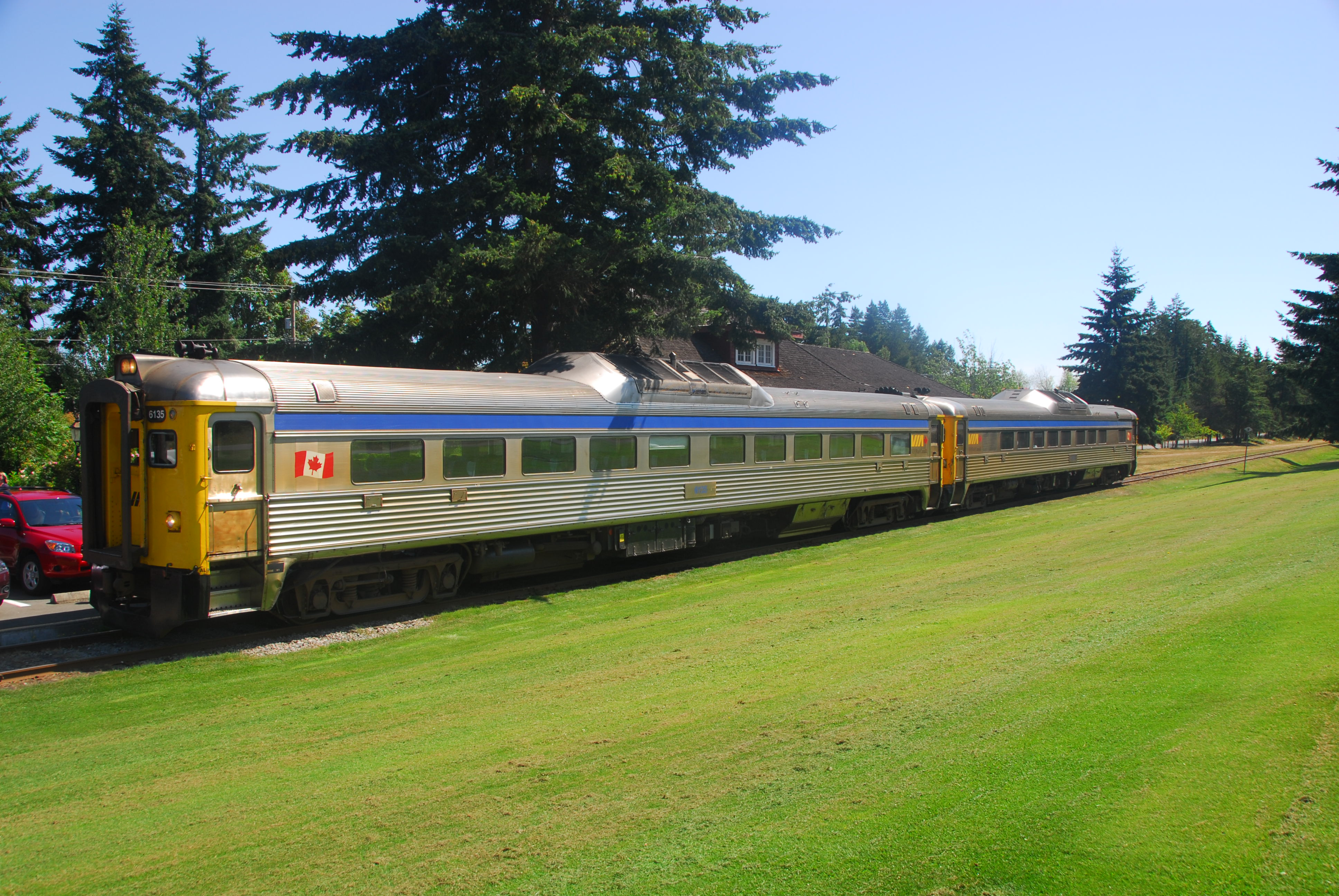
- The Victoria – Courtenay train used Budd Rail Diesel Cars, as seen here at Qualicum Beach.

Overview
- Service type: Inter-city rail
- Status: Indefinitely suspended
- Locale: Vancouver Island
- Last service: March 19, 2011; 14 years ago
- Former operators: Via Rail; Canadian Pacific Railway

Route
- Termini: Victoria; Courtenay
- Distance travelled: 225 kilometres (140 mi)
- Average journey time: 4 hours 45 minutes
- Service frequency: Daily

Technical
- Rolling stock: Budd Rail Diesel Cars
- Track gauge: 4 ft 8 1/2 in (1,435 mm)
- Track owner: Island Corridor Foundation

The Victoria–Courtenay train (named the Malahat until 2009) was a passenger train service operated by Via Rail between Victoria, Nanaimo, and Courtenay on Vancouver Island in British Columbia. The service operated over the Island Rail Corridor. In March 2011, service was suspended indefinitely due to poor track conditions.

== History ==
=== Via Rail Canada ===
The train was formerly operated with Budd Rail Diesel Cars. Via Rail took over passenger services from CP Rail, renaming the service the Malahat in 1979. The tracks were given minor maintenance due to low ridership, leading to service suspension.

=== Service suspension ===
Due to poor track conditions, on March 19, 2011, the service was suspended indefinitely for track replacement work. Prior to further inspection of the track, the service along the segment between Nanaimo and Victoria was originally planned to resume on April 8, but lack of funding prevented any of the work from taking place. A temporary bus replacement was brought in for the service after the closure, but dropping passenger numbers caused the service to be discontinued on August 7. On May 10, nearly two months after suspension, the old Budd cars were moved from the roundhouse in Victoria to a secure yard in Nanaimo, in future hopes of starting commuter service from there. On November 5, they were taken off the island to be returned to central Canada and were to be replaced by new train stock if service resumed. In February 2012, the very short stretch of track from Harbour Road to downtown Victoria was taken out of service due to the removal of the railway bridge as the start of the Johnson Street Bridge replacement project. The Johnson Street Bridge now sits upon the location of the railway bridge. Currently, there are no plans to replace the railway bridge.

In July 2014, following the successful securing of funds from the local, federal, and provincial governments to replace trackage and repair bridges along the line, Via Rail reached an agreement with the Island Corridor Foundation to resume island passenger rail operations. Service between Victoria and Nanaimo was expected to resume in May 2015, with service between Nanaimo and Courtenay beginning in summer 2015. In 2023, the reopening of the rail line was once again delayed as the government called for more consultation after giving a portion of the land back to Snaw-Naw-As First Nations.

== Route ==
When Via Rail took over the service from Canadian Pacific Railway, the line served only Victoria, Duncan, Nanaimo, and Parksville daily except Sundays. In 1979, many intermediate stops that existed until the line's closure were added to the schedule and the train began operating daily. The train operated one daily round trip, departing Victoria in the morning, and returning from Courtenay in the evening. The 225-mile (362 km) trip took 4 hours and 45 minutes each way. Proposals of operating a commuter service as far as Nanaimo, or Cowichan have now shifted to focus on running a Westshore commuter service along the first 15 kilometres of track between Victoria and Langford.

== See also ==
- Alberni Pacific Railway
