= Courtenay station =

Railway station in British Columbia, Canada

Courtenay
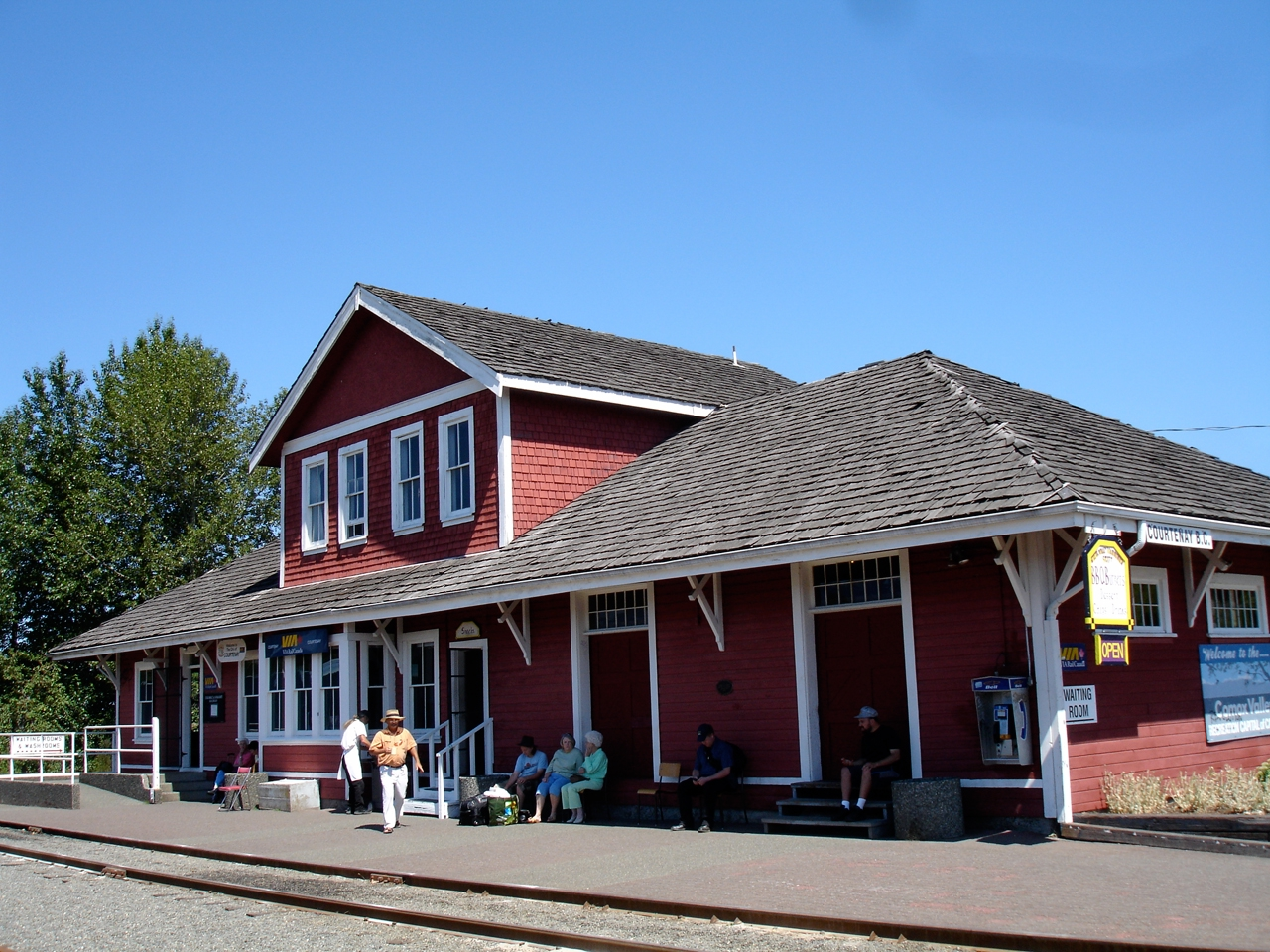
- Courtenay Station in 2009, before closure.

General information
- Location: 899 Cumberland Road; Courtenay, BC, Canada
- Coordinates: 49°41′02″N 125°00′12″W
- Platforms: 1
- Tracks: 1

Construction
- Structure type: Heritage station building
- Parking: Yes
- Accessible: Yes

Former services
Preceding station	Via Rail	Following station
Terminus	Victoria–Courtenay	Union Bay toward Victoria
Preceding station	Esquimalt and Nanaimo Railway	Following station
Terminus	Main Line	Royston toward Victoria
Location
- Location within British Columbia Location within Canada

Courtenay Station is a former railway station in downtown Courtenay, British Columbia. The station was the northern terminus for the Dayliner Via Rail service that ended in 2011.

== History ==
Courtenay Station was built in 1914 when the Esquimalt and Nanaimo Railway reached Courtenay. It was originally supposed to be a stop along the line to Campbell River, however, due to World War I the line only went as far as Courtenay.

The former Canadian Pacific Railway station was given heritage status by the City of Courtenay in 2002.

== Closure ==
The station was closed indefinitely on March 19, 2011 due to track maintenance. However, due to a lack of funding the line was replaced with a bus service, and on August 7, 2011, the station closed. Service was supposed to start in summer 2015, but this was also cancelled due to lack of funding.

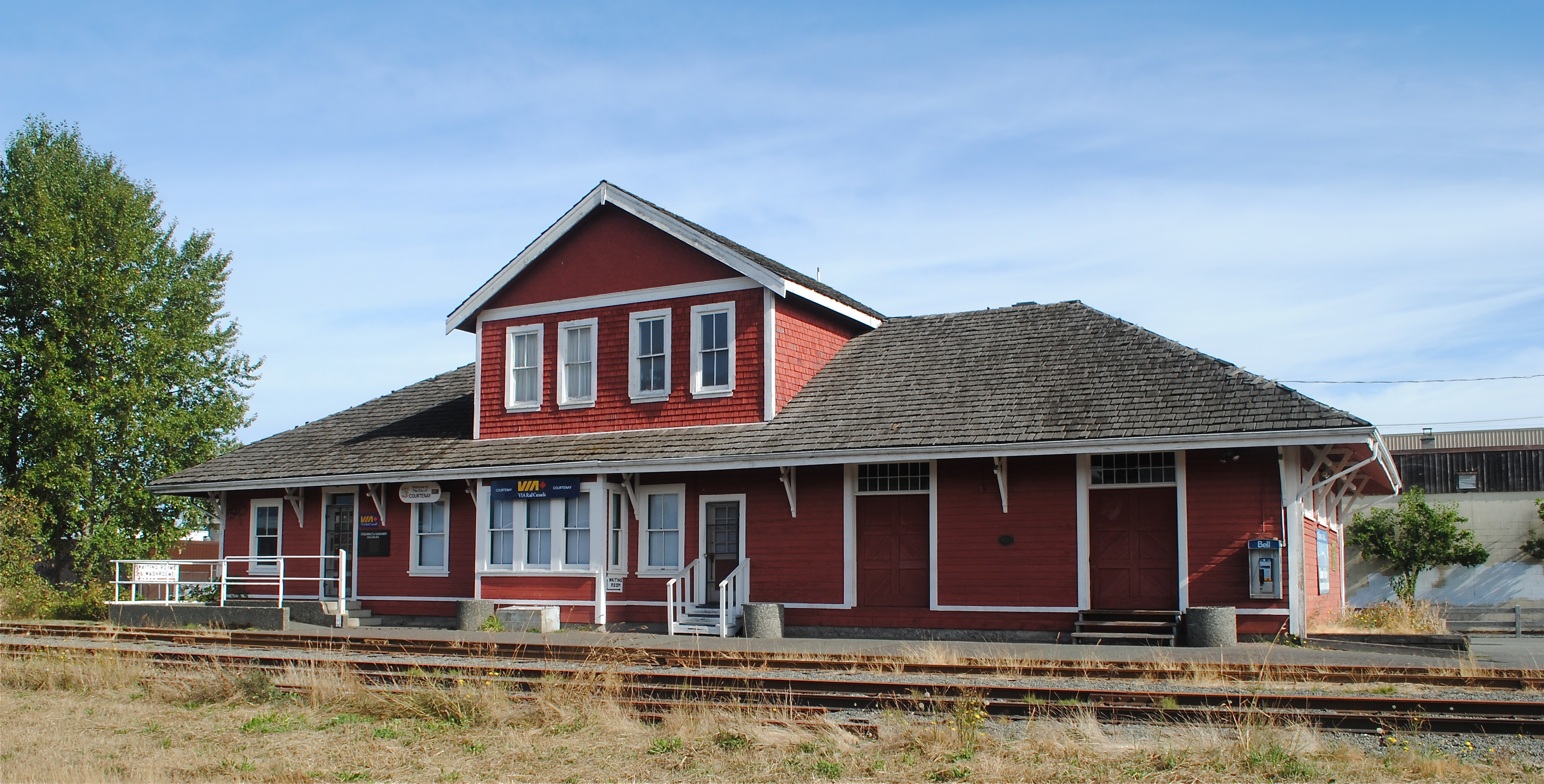
Courtenay Station in 2012, after it closed.
