= Island Rail Corridor =

Railway on Vancouver Island, Canada

Island Corridor
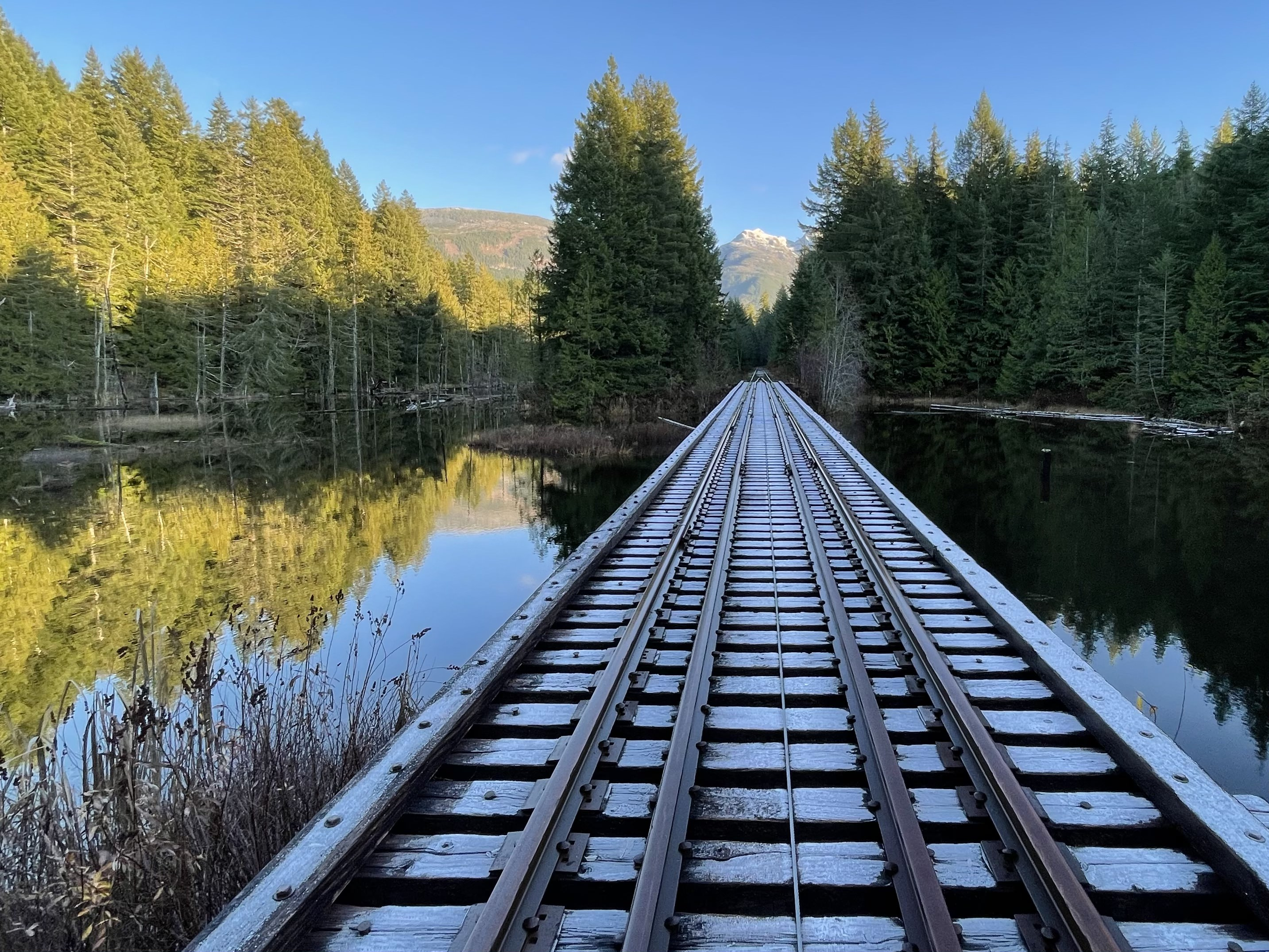
- Summit Lake on the Port Alberni Subdivision with Mount Arrowsmith in the background

Overview
- Headquarters: Nanaimo, British Columbia
- Locale: Vancouver Island, British Columbia
- Dates of operation: Esquimalt & Nanaimo Railway 1884–1905; Canadian Pacific Railway 1905–2018; RailAmerica 2006–2018; Southern Railway of Vancouver Island (under contract with the Island Corridor Foundation) 2006–

Technical
- Track gauge: 1,435 mm (4 ft 8 1/2 in) standard gauge
- Length: 293 km (182 mi)

The Island Corridor, previously the Esquimalt & Nanaimo Railway (E&N Railway), is a railway operation on Vancouver Island. It is owned by the Island Corridor Foundation, a registered charity. The railway line is 225 kilometres (140 mi) in length from Victoria to Courtenay, known as the Victoria Subdivision, with a branch line from Parksville to Port Alberni, known as the Port Alberni Subdivision, of 64 kilometres (40 mi), for a total 289 kilometres (180 mi) of mainline track. In 2006, the Island Corridor Foundation acquired the railway's ownership from RailAmerica and Canadian Pacific Railway.

Passenger service has been "temporarily suspended" since 2011 due to poor infrastructure condition that resulted from deferred maintenance.

== History ==
=== Vancouver Island joining Canada ===
The history of an island railway and a functioning island railway in perpetuity started with the colony of Vancouver Island joining British Columbia in 1866, Canadian Confederation in 1867, and the incorporation of British Columbia (BC) into Canada in 1871. The terms of union required that, within two years, the federal government was to start the construction of a railway from the "seaboard of British Columbia", joining the new province and Victoria with the railway system of Canada. On its part, British Columbia was to grant a band of public land of up to 32 kilometres (20 mi) in width along either side of the railway line to the federal government for it to use in furtherance of the construction of the railway. The Pacific terminus of the railway was not specified, but the proposed plan would have the railway cross the Rockies by the Yellowhead Pass and reach the BC coast at Bute Inlet. It would cross Sonora Island and Quadra Island and reach Vancouver Island by a bridge across Seymour Narrows. Through the influence of then BC Premier Amor de Cosmos, this plan was adopted by Order in Council by the federal government on 7 June 1873. Two shipments of rail were even delivered to Victoria from the United Kingdom. In 1873, Prime Minister of Canada John A. Macdonald had stated that Esquimalt, the site of a naval base, would be the terminus of the "Pacific Railway". However, both the federal government and the Canadian Pacific Railway placed a low priority on construction of an island railway, as it had low traffic potential and would duplicate an existing steamer service.

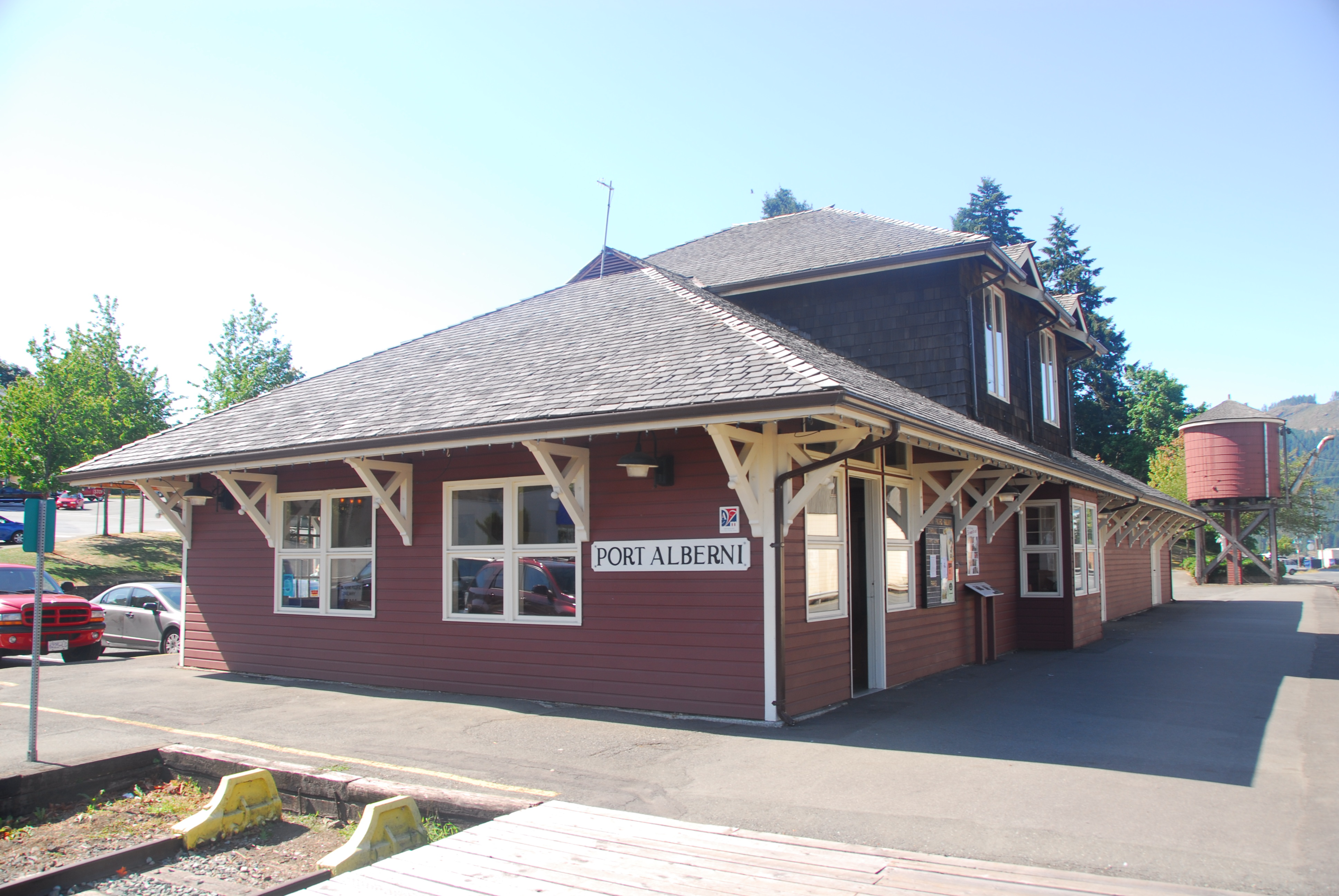
Port Alberni Station is today only used by the heritage Alberni Pacific Railway

In 1874, British Columbia threatened to withdraw from Confederation, and BC premier Walkem petitioned Queen Victoria for relief from these delays. Prime Minister Alexander Mackenzie and Walkem agreed to accept arbitration of the dispute by the Earl of Carnarvon, the colonial secretary. His award, given 17 November 1874, gave an extension of time for the construction and required that a railway be built from Esquimalt to Nanaimo. Despite the promises of both parties to be bound by his ruling, the federal government bill approving the award failed in the Canadian Senate. British Columbians were indignant, and withdrawal from Confederation was raised again.

John A. Macdonald gave a speech in 1881 in the House of Commons on the CPR and criticized Alexander Mackenzie for tinkering with the preconditions of British Columbia and Vancouver Island uniting with Canada. MacDonald said, "Both the Government of which I was the head and the Government of which he was the head were bound by the original resolutions." He continued, "It was admitted that it was a sacred obligation; it was admitted that there was a treaty made with British Columbia, with the people and the Government of British Columbia, and not only was it an agreement and a solemn bargain made between Canada and British Columbia, but it was formally sanctioned by Her Majesty's Government. It was a matter of Colonial policy and Imperial policy in England that the road should be constructed."

=== Land grants ===
==== Coal baron Robert Dunsmuir ====
Robert Dunsmuir, the Nanaimo coal baron and a member of the provincial legislature, was interested in owning the railway project and in the province's coal reserves. The fact that Dunsmuir was a member of the provincial government making the deal aroused some suspicion about corruption. Dunsmuir and three partners (Charles Crocker, Collis P. Huntington and Leland Stanford of California) incorporated the Esquimalt & Nanaimo Railway (less formally the E&N Railway), with Dunsmuir president and owner of one half of the shares. The company estimated that it would cost $1.5 million to construct. Dunsmuir planned to integrate the railway with the systems being built in Washington and Oregon, with a train ferry link from Victoria.

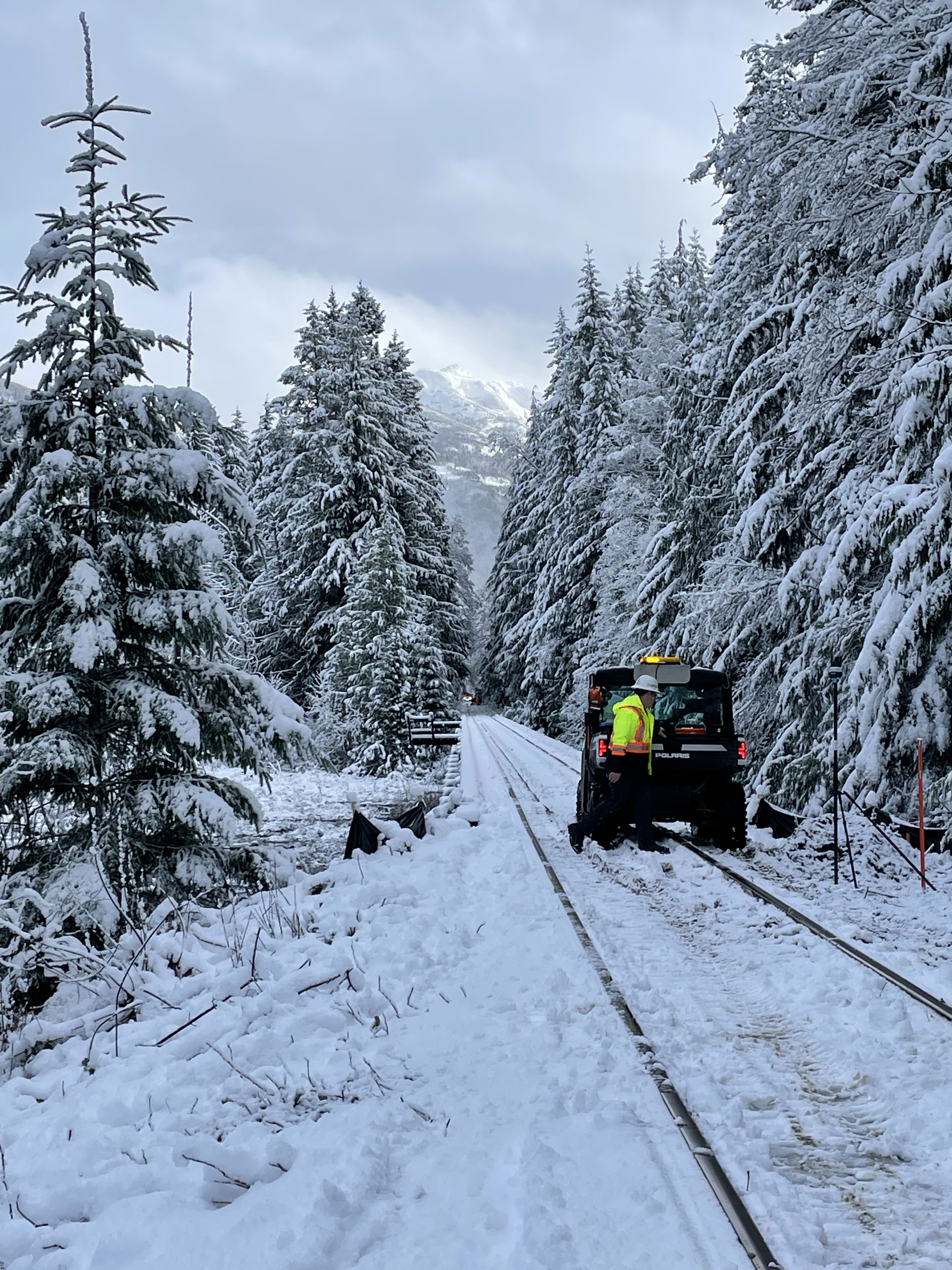
Loon Lake, Port Alberni Subdivision

MacDonald gave British Columbia the choice of Dunsmuir or Lewis M. Clement of San Francisco, chief engineer of the Western Division of the Atlantic and Pacific Railroad, for the contract. Dunsmuir travelled to Ottawa in 1882 with letters of introduction from John Hamilton Gray, one of the Fathers of Confederation, and Joseph Trutch, the first lieutenant governor of British Columbia, both men in favour with Macdonald. After a visit to Ottawa to present himself directly for this project, Dunsmuir went off to Scotland. While in Scotland, Dunsmuir received the news that the provincial government had chosen the Vancouver Land and Railway Company controlled by Clement for the job. Dunsmuir was surprised that Clement would take the contract without a cash grant in addition to the land and commit to building the railway to Seymour Narrows, near Campbell River. When Clement and his company failed to come up with the necessary financial security, Macdonald quickly moved to accept Dunsmuir's terms.

==== Settler rights ====
The court ruled that this grant did not entitle the railway to dispossess existing settlers. The company applied for compensation and received a further grant of 35,112 hectares (86,763 acres) between Crown Mountain and Seymour Narrows. In 1883, the British Columbia government signed a contract with Dunsmuir to build a railway between Esquimalt and Nanaimo in exchange for the same grant of land that Clement had negotiated, amounting to 323,749 hectares (800,000 acres), plus a cash grant of $750,000 from the federal government. Based on an average value of $10 per acre for the land the E&N received, it cost the government $626,660 per mile to build the railway, which when complete was in private hands. The railway was given a massive amount of old-growth forest. Proceeds from the land grants helped build Craigdarroch Castle. The grant amounted to almost 10 percent of Vancouver Island and included mineral rights and all known coal deposits. The land grants to the E&N railway from 1884 to 1925 amounted to 20 percent of Vancouver Island. The company was to receive a grant with the following boundaries (Muir Creek is about 6 km (4 mi) west of Sooke):

On the south by a straight line drawn from the head of Saanich Inlet to Muir Creek, on the Straits of Fuca;
On the west, by a straight line drawn from Muir Creek, aforesaid, to Crown Mountain;
On the north, by a straight line drawn from Crown Mountain to Seymour Narrows; and
On the east, by the coast line of Vancouver Island to the point of commencement.

The grant was facilitated by BC's introduction of the Settlement Act in December 1883, in which surface rights of existing "squatters" were acknowledged and protected.

=== Construction ===
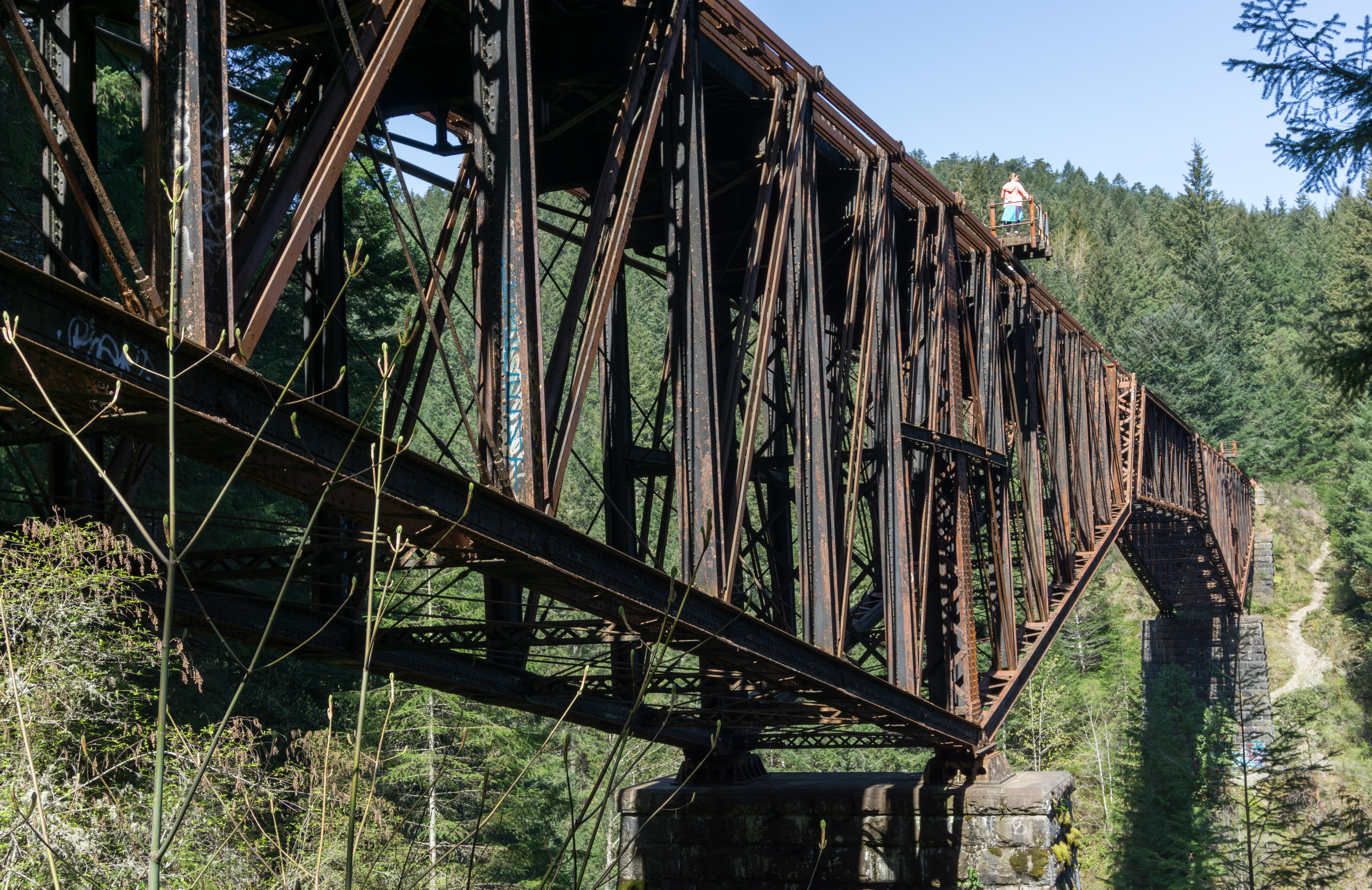
The bridge over Niagara Creek Canyon. This cantilever bridge was built in England in 1883 and first used in Canada crossing the Fraser River at Cisco, where it became known as the Cisco Bridge. It was moved to Vancouver Island for the present crossing in 1910.

The last spike was gold and the hammer was silver. On 13 August 1886, the last spike was driven at Cliffside, Shawnigan Lake, about 40 kilometres (25 mi) north of Victoria. Construction of the island railway took three and a half years. Prime Minister Macdonald drove the last spike, during his only visit to British Columbia. The railway was extended to Dunsmuir's mine at Wellington in 1887, and into Victoria in 1888. It was extended west to Port Alberni in 1911, west to Lake Cowichan in 1912, and north to Courtenay in 1914. The E&N Railway was to have been built all the way to Campbell River, but that plan fell through due to the outbreak of World War I.

The present-day bridge, 17 km (11 mi) north of Victoria, over Niagara Creek Canyon (48.4825°N 123.5574°W) previously crossed the Fraser River at Cisco, British Columbia and was moved 300 km (190 mi) to Niagara Creek Canyon circa 1910. The cantilever suspension bridge was pre-fabricated in England in 1883 and shipped to Canada. It replaced the original wooden trestle bridge, which was damaged in a washout on 12 November 1886.

=== CPR years ===
In 1905, Robert Dunsmuir's son, James Dunsmuir – former BC premier and soon-to-be lieutenant governor) sold the E&N Railway to the Canadian Pacific Railway. The CPR built the railroad to Lake Cowichan, Port Alberni, Parksville, Qualicum Beach, and Courtenay. At its peak, the railroad had 45 stations on the main line, 3 stations on the Cowichan line, and 8 stations on the Port Alberni line.

Between 1905 and 1999, the E&N Railway was owned and operated by the Canadian Pacific Railway. Via Rail took over operation of CPR's passenger train service, called The Malahat, in 1978 when CPR demarketed its freight operation, claiming that freight traffic was declining. In 1996, CPR reorganized the E&N as an "internal short line" named E&N Railfreight while the railbarge operations were sold to Seaspan Intermodal. In early 1999, shortline operator RailAmerica purchased the route from Nanaimo to Port Alberni, and leased the balance of the line. At that time, approximately 8,500 carloads of forest and paper products, minerals, and chemicals were transported by the Southern Vancouver Island Railway each year.

=== RailAmerica ===
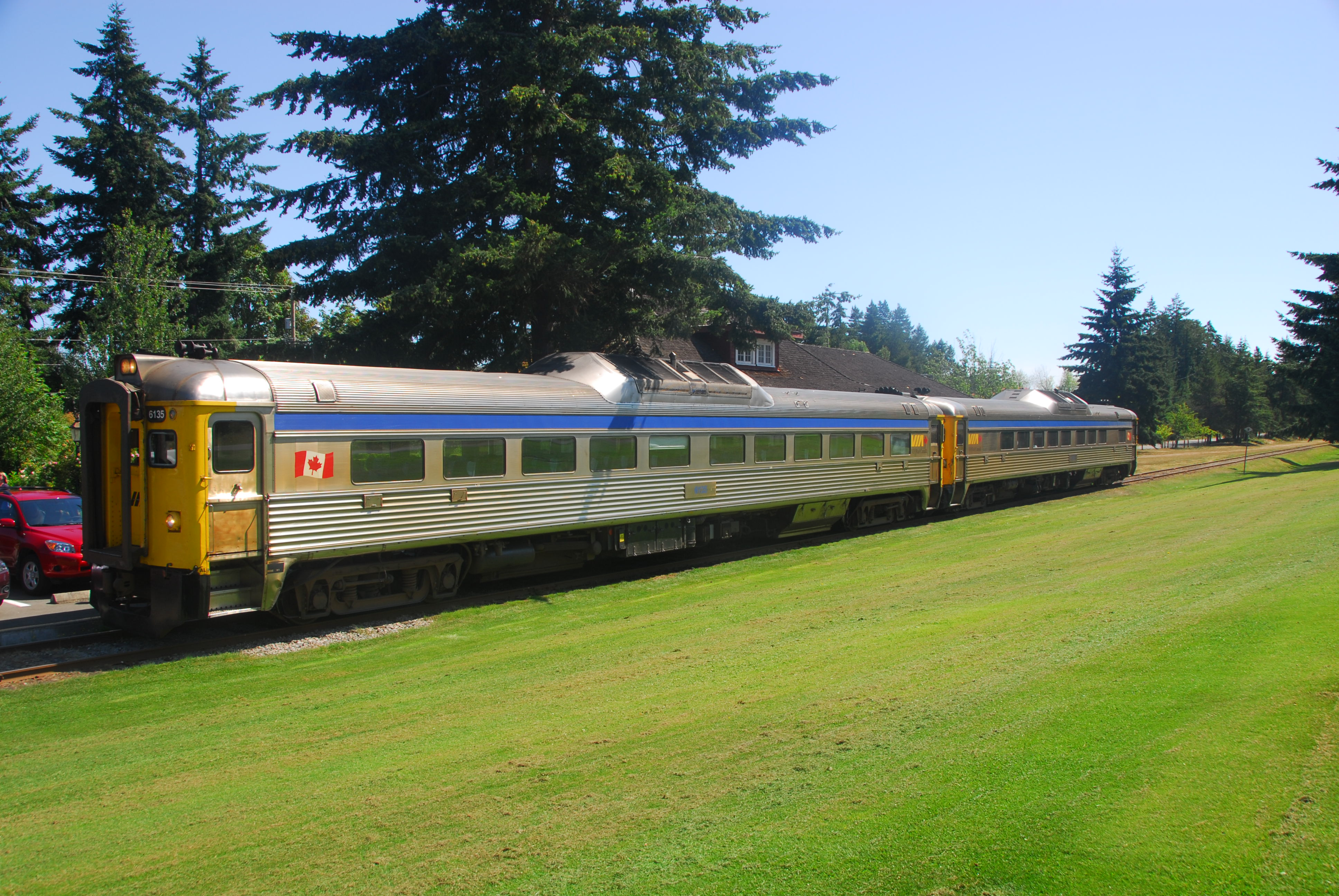
A Budd RDC train operated by VIA Rail at Qualicum Beach

In 1998, CPR sold the middle part of the corridor to RailAmerica. Despite the purchase by RailAmerica, freight traffic continued to decline and the future of the E&N was still in doubt. RailAmerica sought a sale for its acquisition due to unprofitability and deferred maintenance issues. Restrictions from Canadian Pacific on the lease/sale agreement, and major reconstruction of Highway 1 from Victoria to Nanaimo and the new freeway from Nanaimo to Campbell River, led to reduced driving times for the full length of the E&N. This development also affected the privately owned rail line, which did not have the benefit of the provincial subsidies accorded to its competing highways. Freight traffic dropped to about 2,000 carloads a year after the loss of their largest freight customer, a Catalyst Paper pulp mill in Port Alberni. RailAmerica ceased to operate the E&N on 30 June 2006, with the Washington Group's Southern Railway of British Columbia taking over operations the following day.

=== VIA Rail ===
In 1978, VIA Rail assumed operational responsibility for the E&N Railway passenger service. Post ICF ownership, the rail operator agreement had the private company Southern Railway operate the daily inter-city passenger service from Victoria to Courtenay on behalf of VIA Rail. Train tickets had to be purchased three days in advance to avoid an increase in the cost of the fare. In 2011, due to the disrepair of the railway, VIA Rail and Southern Railway suspended the Dayliner passenger service, the Victoria–Courtenay train indefinitely. The train had scheduled stops at Duncan, Nanaimo, and Parksville, with many other flag stops (stops on request) along the way. VIA and Southern Railway did offer a bus service for several months after the closure, but the service was discontinued August 7, 2011. VIA's bus tickets had to be bought three days in advance and fewer than ten people a day used their temporary bus service. The VIA passenger service used Budd-built Rail Diesel Cars (Dayliners). Those rail cars are no longer on Vancouver Island, and at least one is now owned by Rapido Trains, a model railroad company.

=== Names ===
Until 1996, it was called the Esquimalt & Nanaimo Railway (which it is still called by people living on the Island). It then spent three years as E&N Railfreight, an internal short line within then owner Canadian Pacific Railway. Operations were then sold to RailAmerica. The RailAmerica subsidiary was named E&N Railway Co (1998) Ltd. (reporting mark ENR), thus maintaining the historic name associations for the Vancouver Island line. Currently, the right of way and rail line is owned by the Island Corridor Foundation and operated under contract by Southern Railway of British Columbia, a part of the Washington Companies.

== Island Corridor Foundation ==
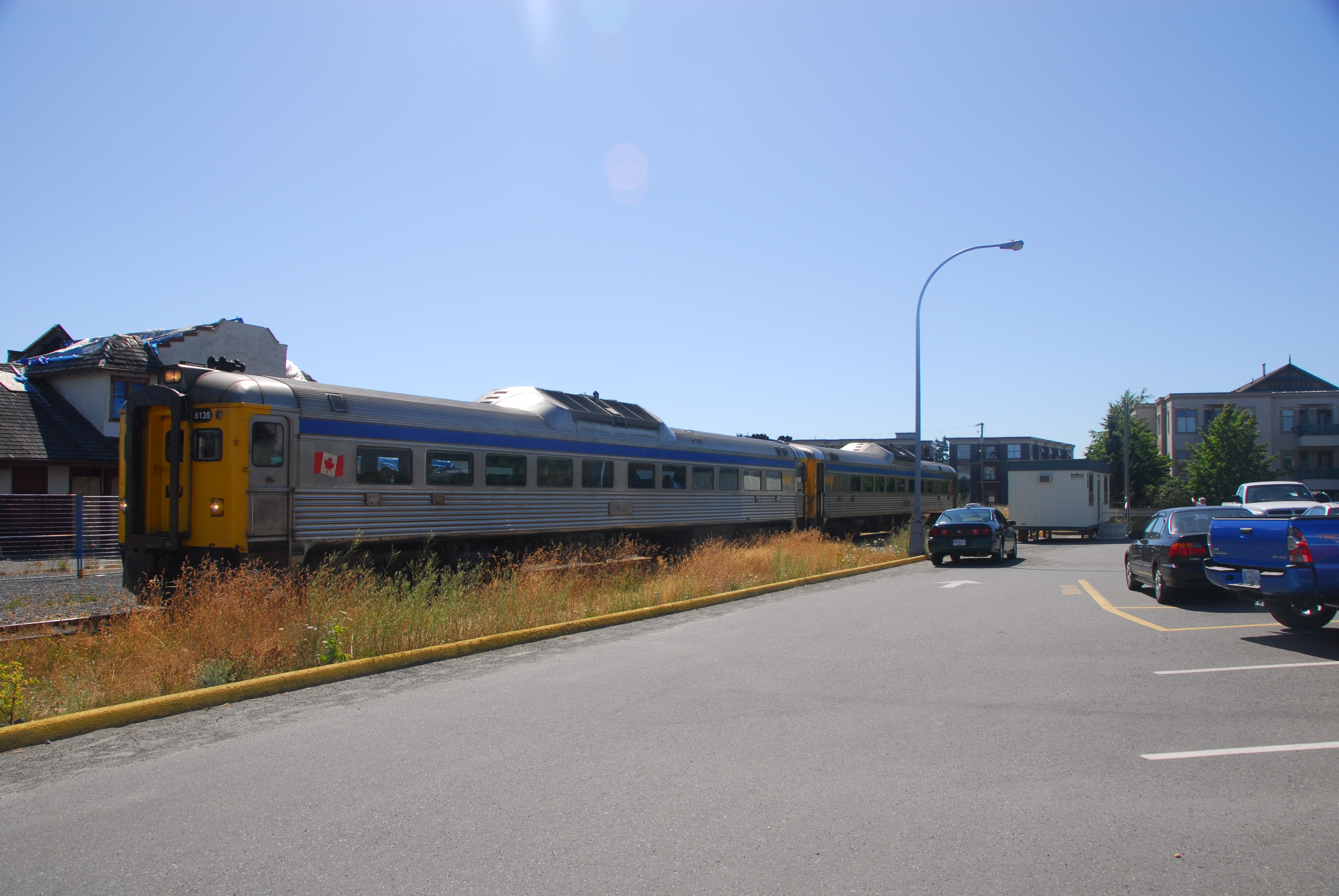
A VIA Rail RDC in Nanaimo

=== Tax gift ===
The not for profit Island Corridor Foundation is a partnership between the Cowichan Tribes and local governments along the rail line. After years of work and negotiations, the ICF came to agreements with the Canadian Pacific Railway and with RailAmerica to hand over its Island rail assets to the foundation for tax credits.

In February 2006, the Canadian Pacific Railway donated its 225 km (140 miles) portion of the railway right-of-way, which averages 30.48 m (100 ft) in width between Victoria and Courtenay, to the Island Corridor Foundation. The donation tax credit exchange was estimated to be valued at 236M CAD and encompasses 6.51 km^{2} (2.51 sq mi) of land, six historic railway stations and a number of trestles. In addition, CPR also supplied 2.3M CAD in "seed money" to the Foundation. Lands were also given that produce non-rail revenue generated by property leases and encroachments on the line.

On 22 March 2006, RailAmerica donated ownership of the Port Alberni to Nanaimo portion of the railway to the Island Corridor Foundation.

=== Freight ===
ICF chose Southern Railway of British Columbia (SRY) to operate the Island railway on Vancouver Island, after ICF's acquisition of the railroad. The operator agreement started on July 1, 2006. In January 2010, the Southern Railway of British Columbia new train ferry terminal started operating in the Fraser River on Annacis Island shipping to Nanaimo via the Seaspan train ferry. The new train marine terminal was built with the help of $4.6 million in federal funding and cost $11 million. It increases the mainland's capacity and speed to load and unload railcar barges from the island.

The amount of freight traffic in 2008 and 2009 was about 1,000 cars per year. According to the Rule of 100, a generally accepted economic formula for short-line railways, a minimum of 100 freight cars per mile a year is required before a line is profitable due to depreciation accounting. The old E&N route averages about 6.6 cars per mile. The ICF has estimated there is a potential business of 22,000 rail cars of freight each year on Vancouver Island.

An ICF development strategies report estimated that 35,000 to 40,000 carloads per year, as the amount of business that would be required to bear the full capital cost of upgrading the railroad and maintain operations on a sustainable basis. If the capital costs of upgrading the railway are excluded, the business of 8,000 carloads per year would be required to pay for basic operating and maintenance costs. The most significant potential revenue is the Raven coal mine (west of Fanny Bay) needing up to 10,000 carloads per year. The foundation report noted the market potential for sourcing of aggregates like gravel for the Victoria market from alternative reserves up-Island. However, this market would be extremely competitive due to the availability of shipments of aggregate by barge from the Lehigh Materials (part of Lehigh Hanson) facility in Sechelt and the new Johnson Street Bridge providing barge access to downtown Victoria.

In November 2014, SRY freight service along much of the Duncan-to-Parksville segment of the line was suspended following a risk assessment after the disrepair of the track had been continuously slowing train speeds down. No timeline was known for when service will resume.

As of 2018, the only regularly operated track left is a truncated 10-mile section in the Nanaimo area, from Welcox Yard at the waterfront to Wellington siding, to serve the Superior Propane spur in north Nanaimo. In addition, some customers have their goods transloaded to trucks within Welcox Yard.

The ICF is a partnership of the various local governments and First Nations communities along the railway, including 14 municipalities, 5 regional districts and 12 First Nations.

== Railway dormancy and delayed re-openings ==
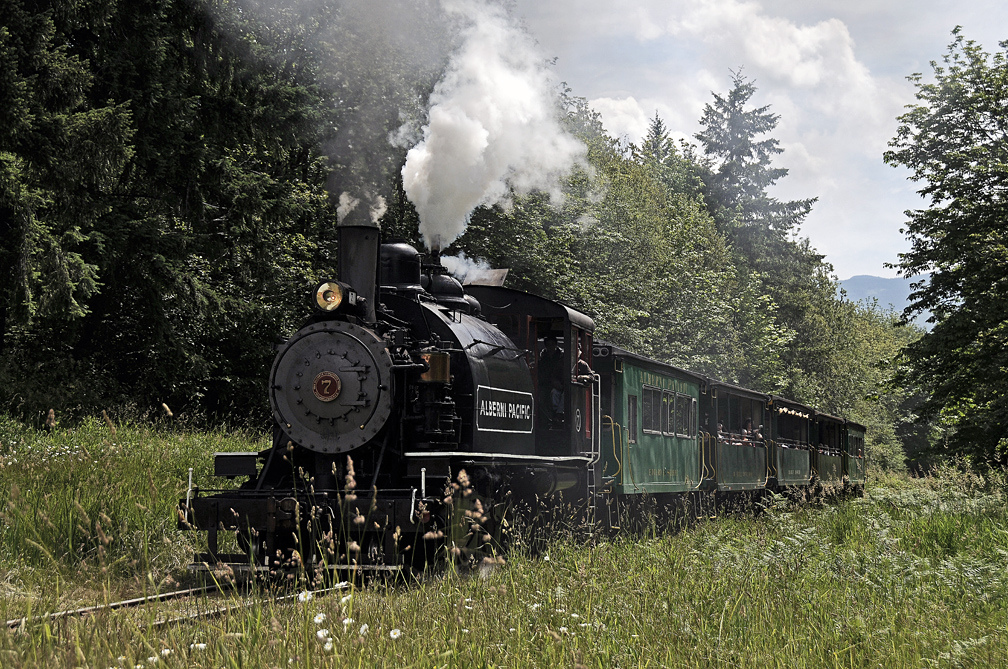
Alberni Pacific excursion train, June 2013

Beginning March 18, 2011 passenger service between Victoria and Courtenay was "temporarily suspended" due to safety concerns about the poor condition of the tracks. In April 2012, the Canadian federal government announced that it would match a $7.5 million grant offered by the provincial government of British Columbia, providing the required $15 million for basic repairs and upgrades to reopen the rail line. The line was expected to reopen, and rail services re-commence in 2013, as early as the spring, but was delayed due to failed negotiations between the Island Corridor Foundation and VIA Rail. In July 2014, an agreement was signed by VIA Rail to resume operations with plans to have services resume in the summer of 2015, but in April 2015, the ICF stated that the resumption of service has been put on hold while the British Columbia Ministry of Transportation and provincial government review the funds for covering repair costs. As of 2017, the IFC can't say when rail service will return..

In 2025-6, demonstration of hi-rail bus a potential tourist project between Port Alberni and Ladysmith occurred.

== Vancouver Island Transportation Corridor Coalition ==
A non-profit society, the Vancouver Island Transportation Corridor Coalition (VITCC), announced formation on July 7, 2020, to facilitate the return of rail service to Vancouver Island. The VITCC mandate is to promote modernizing the former E&N rail corridor as the backbone of the Island's future transportation system for commuters and freight alike, integrating with all other forms of transportation. They also seek to expand the cycling and pedestrian trails alongside the railway from the current more than 100 kilometres.

== Bike path beside E&N in Victoria and Nanaimo ==
A bike path named the E&N Rail Trail has been built beside the E&N tracks from Vic West to Langford. In April 2007 the Island Corridor Foundation agreed to lease its land in Greater Victoria to the Capital Regional District (CRD) for development of the bike trail. Construction began in 2009, and as of August 2021 there is approximately 3.6 km left to build to reach Humpback Road, the currently planned western end of the CRD built trail.

In Nanaimo, an 8 km (5.0 mi) trail was built in the 1990s. The E&N Trail is a multi-purpose paved trail for cycling, walking, roller blading and wheelchairs. It stretches from Townsite Road in the south to Mostar in the north where it connects to the 20 km (12 mi) Parkway Trail.

In the fall of 2013, a partnership of various community groups interested in moving the E&N Rail Trail forward was formed and the Nanaimo Regional Rail Trail Partnership was born. The NRRTP comprises the Downtown Business Improvement Association (DNBIA), Tourism Nanaimo, the Regional District of Nanaimo (RDN), the City of Nanaimo, the Greater Nanaimo Cycling Coalition (GNCC) and the Island Corridor Foundation (ICF). As of 2015, the group has raised funds and is building the E&N extension trail from the old Nanaimo train station to 7th Avenue in the south. It planned to have that multi-use trail finished by 2019.

Concurrently, north of Nanaimo, the Regional District of Nanaimo started with two new sections in 2018. The first sections of trail will total approximately 10 kilometres (6.2 mi) and will connect Parksville with Coombs and French Creek.

== Rapid transit on E&N in Victoria ==
In 1996, a BC Transit report proposed renewing the track and enhancing road crossings, to travel 13.3 km (8.3 miles) to arrive over the bridge into downtown Victoria from Station Avenue, Langford. The travel time was 24 minutes, using the existing track, including stops, and restricting the speed to 25 km/h (16 mph) due to the condition of the railway and street crossings.

In 2008, a report by the British Columbia Ministry of Transportation and Infrastructure put the travel time at 36 minutes, using the existing track, and having a train travelling a further distance of 17.2 km (10.7 mi) from western Langford. This includes six stops and stopping at each station for half a minute. The speed varies from 8 to 65 km/h (5 to 40 mph).

In 2026, the federal government announced $500,000 in funding for a feasibility study for "light passenger rail" from Victoria West to Langford on a portion of the abandoned Esquimalt & Nanaimo Railway. The study would be carried out by the non-profit Island Corridor Foundation, and conclude by late 2027. Part of the right-of-way runs through First Nation land and would need their approval. In late 2024, about 10 acres of the corridor was given back to the Snaw-Naw-As (Nanoose) First Nation, and one kilometre of track has since been removed.

== Sources ==
- Francis, Daniel, ed. (1999). Encyclopedia of British Columbia. Harbour Publishing. ISBN 1-55017-200-X.
- Reksten, Terry (1991). The Dunsmuir Saga. Vancouver: Douglas & McIntyre. ISBN 0-88894-742-9.
- MacLachlan, Donald F. (1986). The Esquimalt & Nanaimo Railway - The Dunsmuir Years: 1884-1905. The B.C. Historical Railway Association. ISBN 0-9692511-0-6.

== See also ==
- Esquimalt and Nanaimo Railway Roundhouse
- List of heritage railways in Canada
