= Revelstoke station =

Railway station in Alberta, Canada

Revelstoke
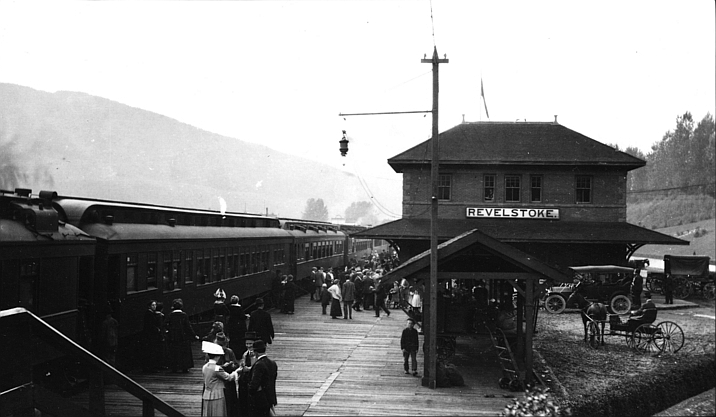
- The station circa 1915.

General information
- Location: 719 Track St W, Revelstoke, British Columbia; Canada
- Coordinates: 51.003970°N 118.200378°W

History
- Opened: 1905
- Closed: 1990
- Rebuilt: 1923, 1966, 1978
- Former names: Canadian Pacific Railway
Former services
Preceding station	Via Rail	Following station
Kamloops toward Vancouver	The Canadian before 1990	Lake Louise toward Toronto
Preceding station	Canadian Pacific Railway	Following station
Kamloops toward Vancouver	Main Line	Stephen toward Montreal Windsor
Location
- Location within British Columbia Location within Canada

Revelstoke station was a railway station in Revelstoke, British Columbia, Canada. It was previously used by the Canadian Pacific Railway and Via Rail. The station is on a Canadian Pacific Kansas City line.

The station was originally built for the Canadian Pacific Railway in 1905, serving the nearby city of Revelstoke. The station was rebuilt in 1923, received a modern extension in 1966, and was again torn down and rebuilt 1978. The 1978 station now serves as a yard office. The station used to serve transcontinental trains from Vancouver to Toronto and Montreal, such as the Imperial Limited, The Dominion, and The Canadian. The Imperial Limited and Dominion were discontinued in 1933 and 1966 respectively, leaving the Canadian as the only train service to Revelstoke even after VIA Rail took over operations in 1978. The Canadian was rerouted via the Canadian National Railway route in 1990 after budget cuts, ending service to Revelstoke.
