= Tower Centre =

Railway station in Alberta, Canada

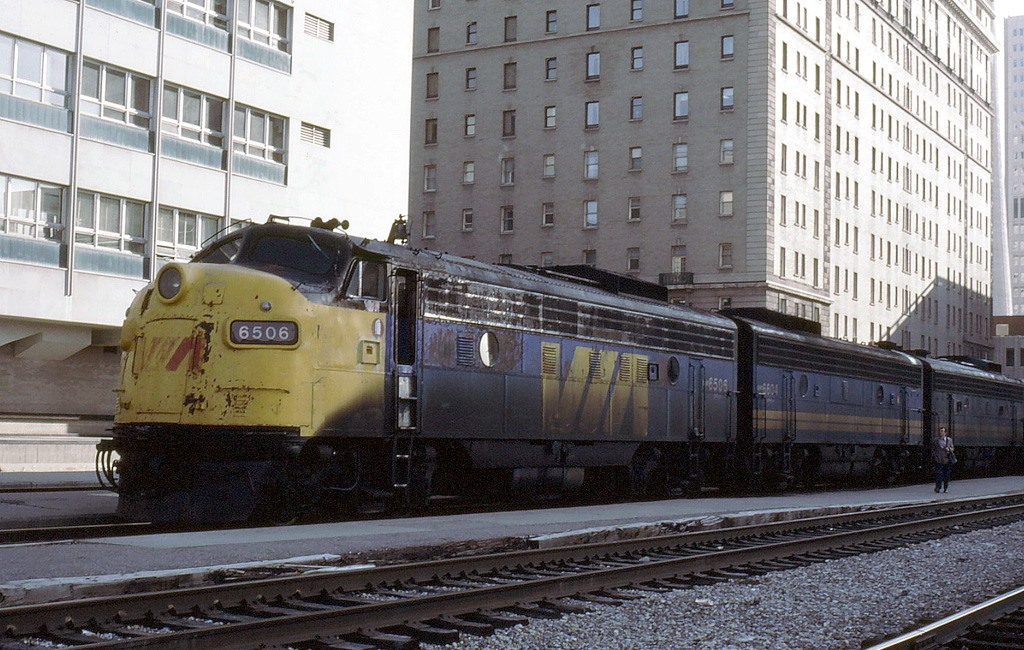
- A Via Rail train at the station in 1982

General information
- Location: 131 9 Ave SW, Calgary, Alberta
- Coordinates: 51.0441°N 114.0631°W
- Owner: Aspen Properties

Construction
- Structure type: Underground
- Parking: 1,403 above ground stalls

Other information
- Status: Disused
- Website: www.aspenproperties.ca/tower-centre

History
- Opened: May 1969 (as Canadian Pacific Railway station)
- Closed: January 1990 (as Via Rail station)
- Former names: Canadian Pacific Railway; Via Rail; Rocky Mountaineer

Former services
Preceding station	Via Rail	Following station
Banff toward Vancouver	The Canadian before 1990	Medicine Hat toward Toronto
Preceding station	Rocky Mountaineer	Following station
Banff towards Vancouver	First Passage to the West	Terminus
Preceding station	Canadian Pacific Railway	Following station
Brickburn toward Vancouver	Main Line	Ogden toward Montreal Windsor
Turner toward Macleod	Macleod – Edmonton	Beddington toward Edmonton
Location
- Location within Calgary Location within Alberta Location within Canada

Tower Centre in Calgary, Alberta, Canada, is an office tower and retail centre connected to the Calgary Tower. It is only three minutes on foot from the CTrain's 1 Street SW station and Centre Street station. It was called Palliser Square from its opening in 1969 until the name was changed to Tower Centre in November 1989. Since 2003, Tower Centre has also been the home of Vertigo Theatre.

== Former railway services ==
Below the half of the office and retail complex to the west of the Calgary Tower are the remains of a disused inter-city railway station. The station was formerly used by Canadian Pacific Railway, Via Rail, Rocky Mountaineer and Royal Canadian Pacific passenger train services. The station is on the Canadian Pacific Kansas City railway line.

The station was completed in May 1969 to serve the Canadian Pacific Railway. Following Via Rail's takeover of Canadian Pacific's passenger services, it was managed by Via Rail until the company's January 1990 service reductions ended regular rail services to Calgary. Afterwards, both Rocky Mountaineer and Royal Canadian Pacific used the station intermittently for several years as a boarding point for their rail tours.
