= Great Northern Passenger Station (Bellingham, Washington) =

Former train station

Bellingham, WA
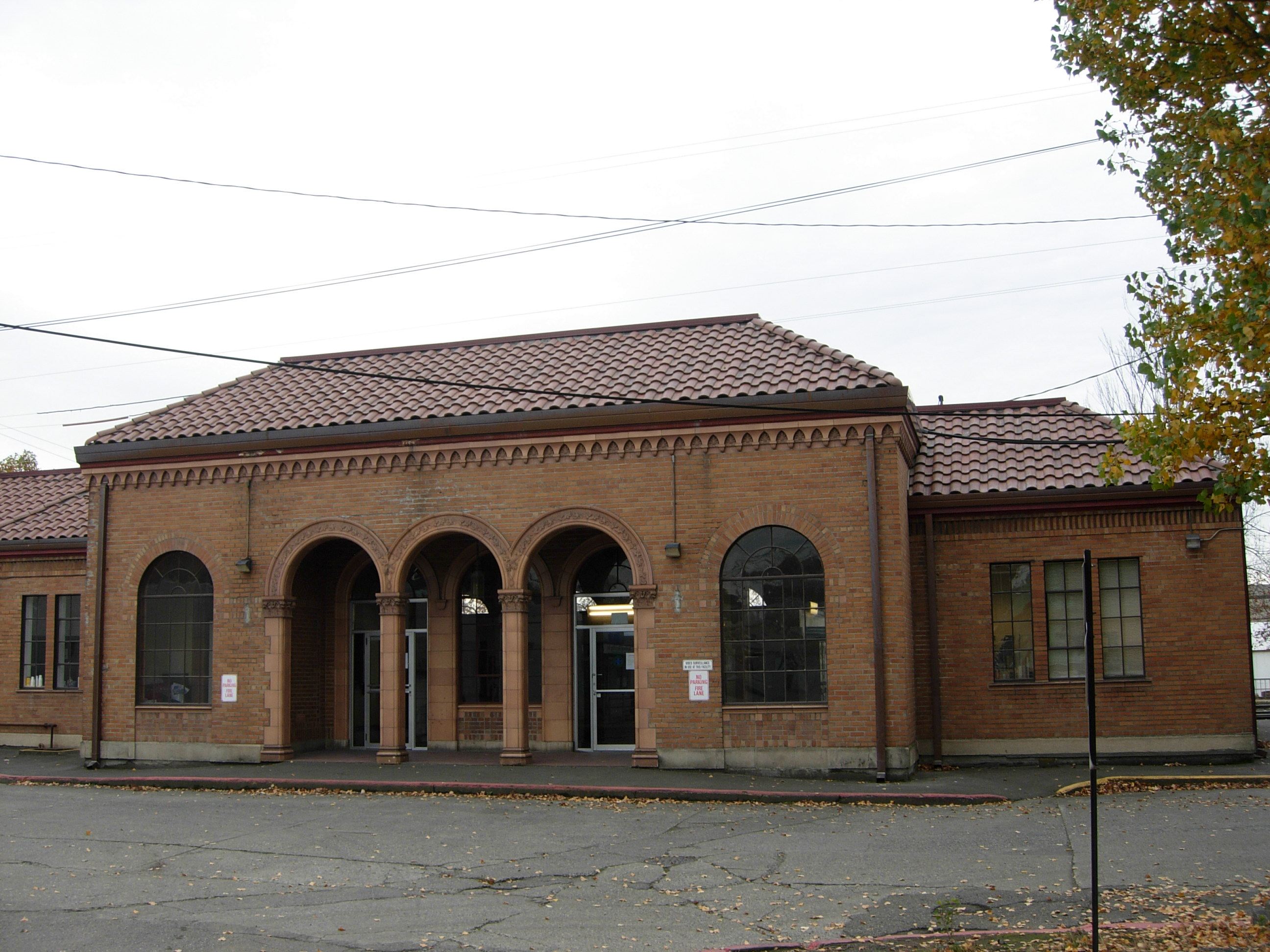

General information
- Location: South end of D Street; Bellingham, Washington
- Coordinates: 48°45′14″N 122°29′07″W
- Owner: BNSF Railway
- Line: BNSF Bellingham Subdivision

History
- Opened: 1902
- Closed: April 30, 1971; September 30, 1981
- Rebuilt: 1927

Services
Preceding station	Amtrak	Following station
Mt. Vernon-Burlington toward Seattle	Pacific International	Blaine toward Vancouver, British Columbia
Preceding station	Great Northern Railway	Following station
South Bellingham toward Seattle	Vancouver, BC – Seattle	Ferndale toward Vancouver, BC
- Great Northern Passenger Station
- U.S. National Register of Historic Places
- Built: 1927
- Architect: F. Stanley Piper
- NRHP reference No.: 75001879
- Added to NRHP: May 30, 1975
Location

Great Northern Passenger Station is a former railway station in Bellingham, Washington, United States. The first station on the site was built in 1902 by the Great Northern Railway. After a fire damaged the depot, a new building was constructed in 1927 at a cost of $75,000 ($1.39 million in 2025 adjusted for inflation). Burlington Northern Railway service ended after April 30, 1971, but the Amtrak Pacific International returned trains to the station the following year.

The building was added to the National Register of Historic Places on May 30, 1975. The Pacific International would go on to be discontinued in 1981; Bellingham constructed a new station at Fairhaven for Amtrak service when it returned in 1995.
