= Lake Louise station =

Railway station in Alberta, Canada

Lake Louise
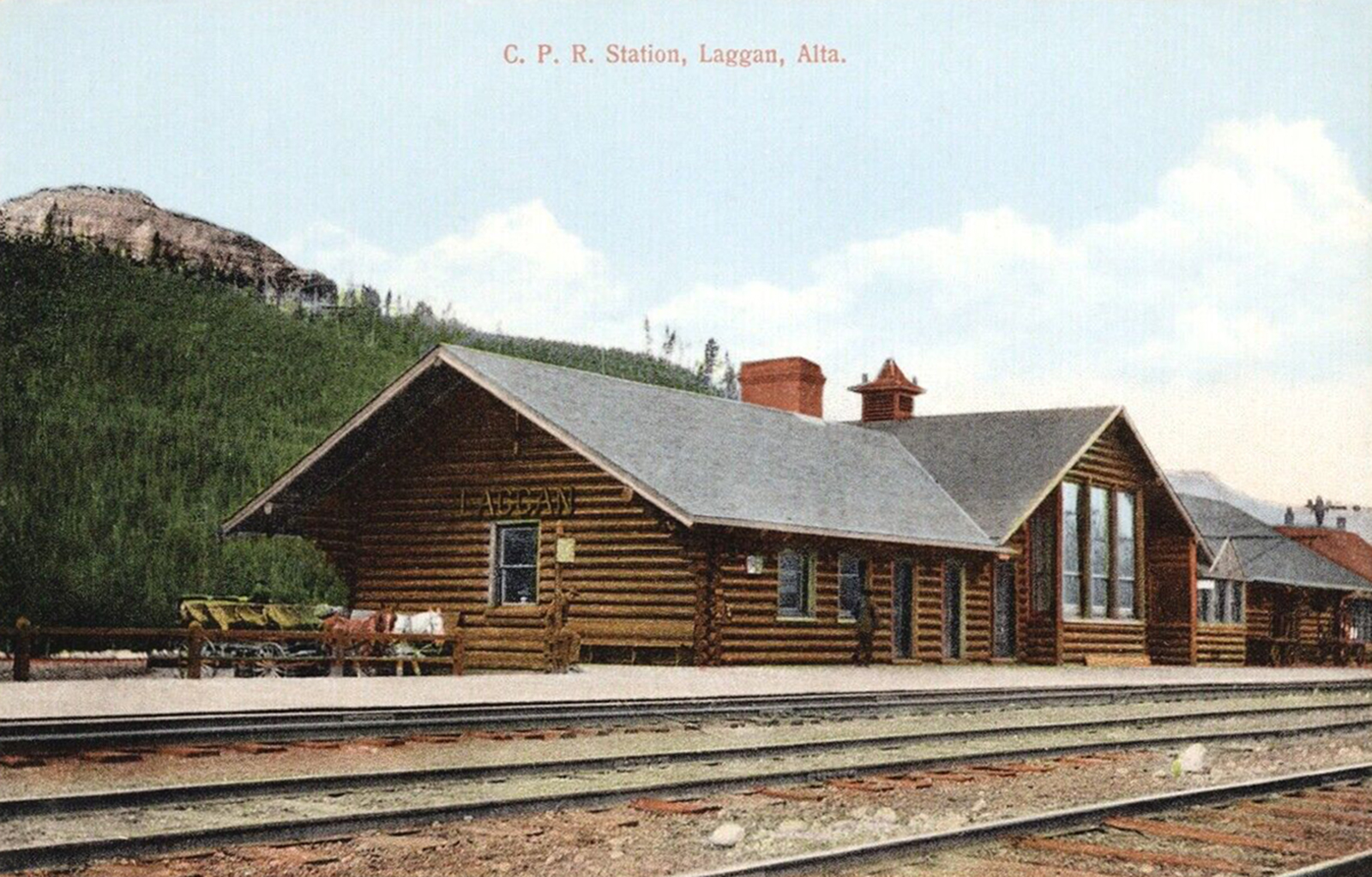
- The station circa 1915.

General information
- Location: 200 Sentinel Road, Lake Louise, Alberta; Canada
- Coordinates: 51°25′27″N 116°11′2″W

History
- Opened: 1910
- Former names: Laggan station Canadian Pacific Railway

Services
Preceding station	Rocky Mountaineer	Following station
Kamloops towards Vancouver	First Passage to the West	Banff Terminus
Former services
Preceding station	Via Rail	Following station
Revelstoke toward Vancouver	The Canadian before 1990	Banff toward Toronto
Preceding station	Rocky Mountaineer	Following station
Kamloops towards Seattle	Coastal Passage	Banff Terminus
Preceding station	Canadian Pacific Railway	Following station
Stephen toward Vancouver	Main Line	Eldon toward Montreal Windsor
Location
- Location within Alberta Location within Canada

Lake Louise station is a railway station in Lake Louise, Alberta, Canada. Historically served by the Canadian Pacific Railway (CPR) and Via Rail, it is now a stop for the Rocky Mountaineer and houses a restaurant. The station is on the Canadian Pacific Kansas City main line near Lower Lake Louise, downhill from the Chateau Lake Louise.

The station was originally built for the CPR. The station was declared a heritage railway station by the federal government in 1991. Starting in 1909, it was the first of six mountain stations built by the Canadian Pacific in a rustic log building design, consistent with how the railway marketed the region as a wilderness tourist destination.

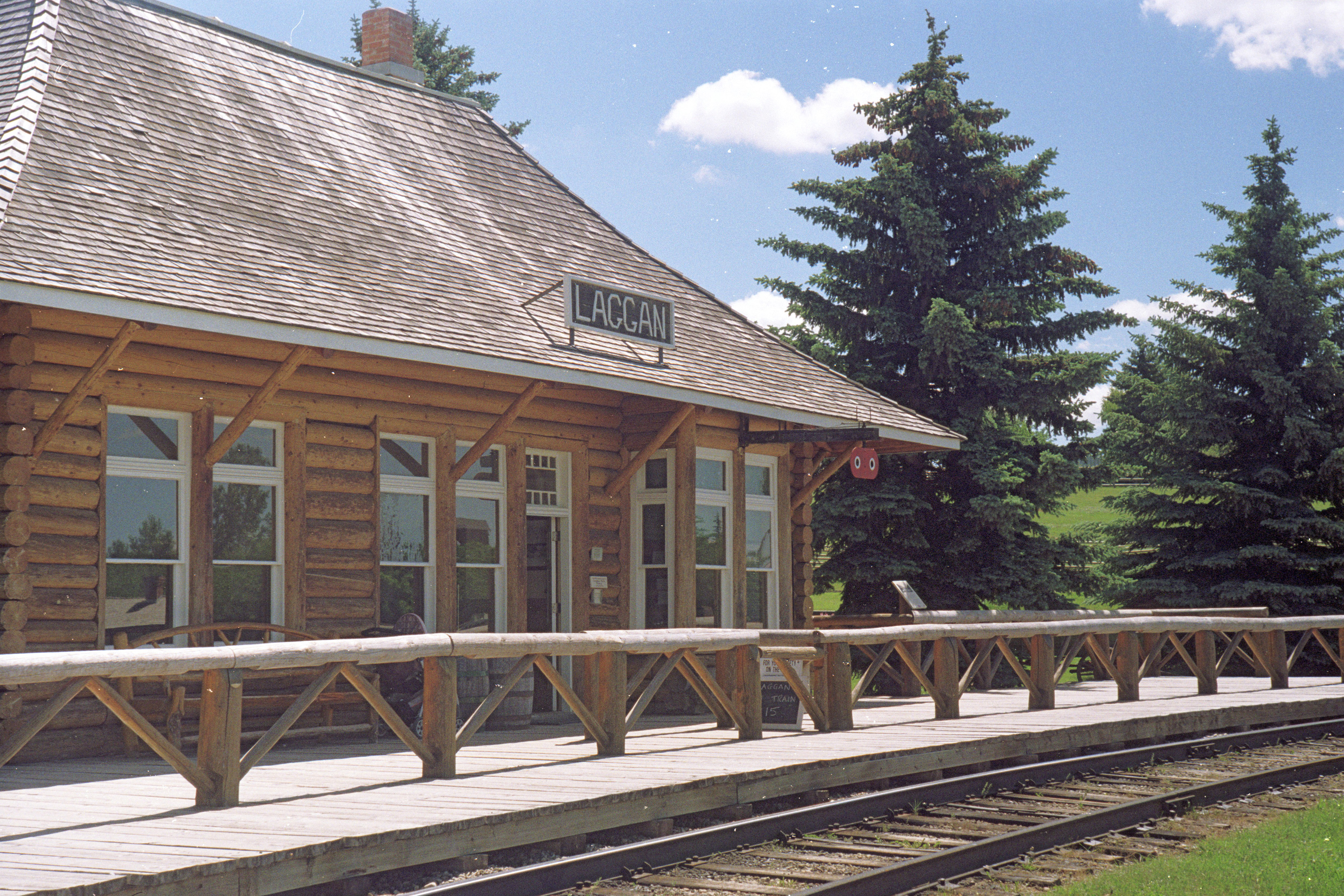
Former Laggan station, now in Heritage Park in Calgary.

The older depot that the 1910 building replaced continued to be used by the CPR for other purposes. The CPR donated it in 1976 to Heritage Park Historical Village in Calgary. The depot was moved to the park and restored to the era when the Lake Louise village was called Laggan.
