= Dominion (train) =

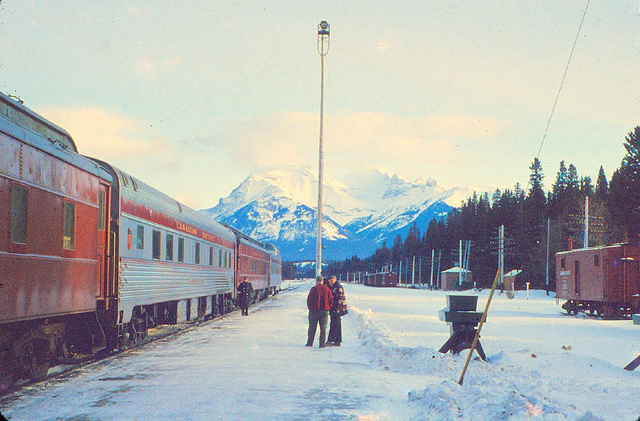
- The Dominion at Banff railway station in late 1959.

Overview
- Service type: Long-distance passenger train
- Status: Discontinued
- Locale: Canada
- Predecessor: Imperial Limited
- First service: 1931
- Last service: February 1966
- Successor: The Canadian; Expo Limited
- Former operator(s): Canadian Pacific Railway

Route
- Termini: Toronto; Vancouver
- Train number(s): 1, 2, 3, 4

Technical
- Track gauge: 4 ft 8 1/2 in (1,435 mm)

The Dominion was a Canadian transcontinental passenger train operated by the Canadian Pacific Railway. It first began as a summer service between Toronto, Ontario, and Vancouver, British Columbia, operating in 1931 and 1932. Effective June 23, 1933, it replaced the Imperial Limited as the CPR's main transcontinental service and included a Montreal, Quebec – Sudbury, Ontario section.

It remained CPR's flagship train until the introduction of the stainless steel dome streamliner The Canadian on April 24, 1955. In 1960 the train was reconfigured as a "transcontinental local" service on the same route as the Canadian to provide services on shorter trips. The Dominion had previously carried a large amount of mail and express parcels, which afterward was carried on fast freights as well as on The Canadian. This reduced The Dominion to a typical consist of four coaches and a baggage car. The service was eliminated officially on April 24, 1966, but continued on as the Expo Limited (serving the Montreal World's Fair) for much of 1967.
