= Banff station =

Railway station in Banff, Canada

Banff
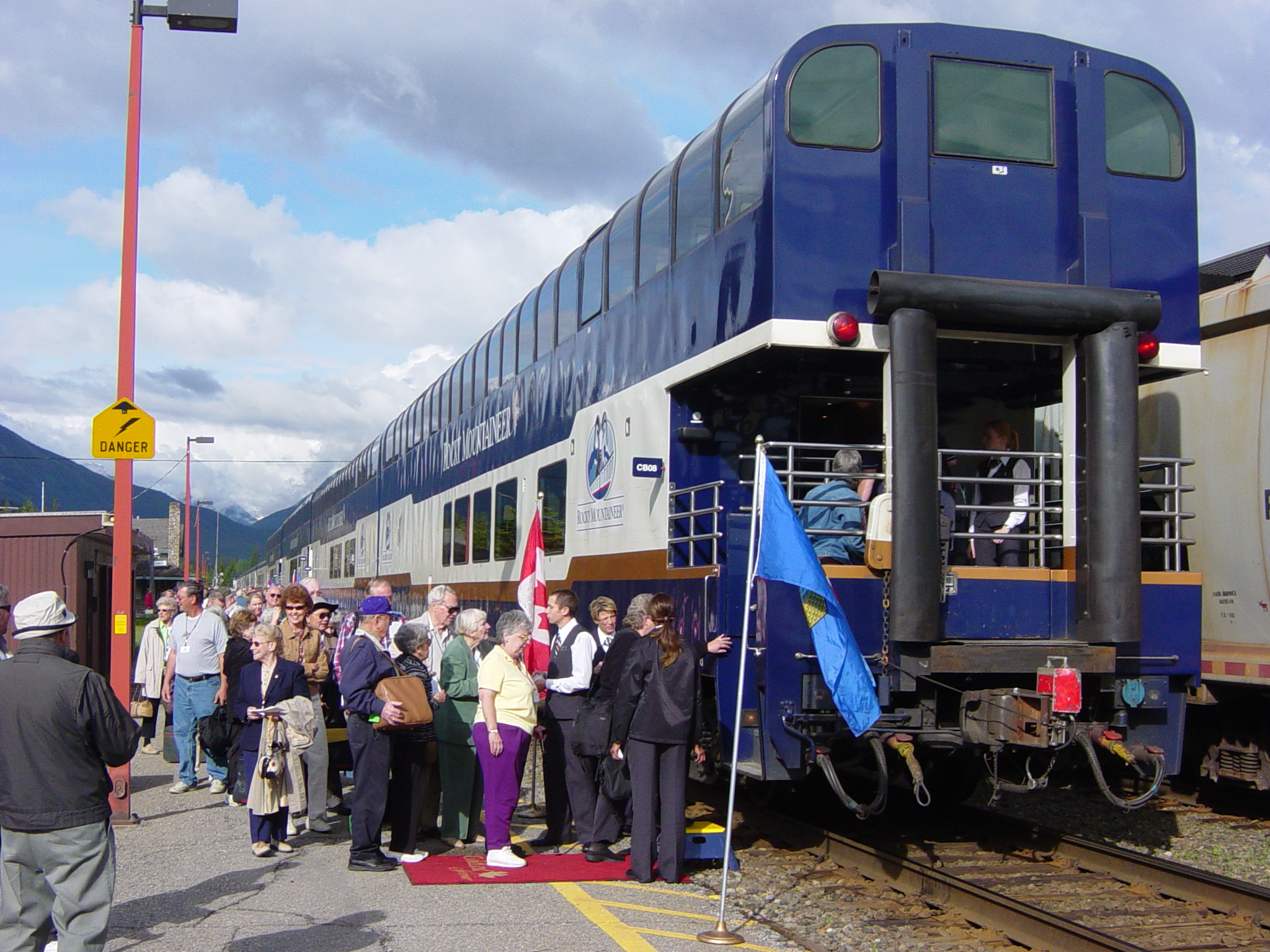
- A train at the former station

General information
- Location: Railway Avenue, Banff, Alberta; Canada
- Coordinates: 51°10′55″N 115°34′33″W

History
- Original company: Canadian Pacific Railway; Via Rail

Former services
Preceding station	Rocky Mountaineer	Following station
Lake Louise towards Vancouver	First Passage to the West	Terminus
Other former services
Preceding station	Via Rail	Following station
Lake Louise toward Vancouver	The Canadian before 1990	Calgary toward Toronto
Preceding station	Rocky Mountaineer	Following station
Lake Louise towards Vancouver	First Passage to the West	Calgary Terminus
Lake Louise towards Seattle	Coastal Passage	Terminus
Preceding station	Canadian Pacific Railway	Following station
Castle Mountain toward Vancouver	Main Line	Bankhead toward Montreal Windsor
Location
- Location within Alberta Location within Canada

Banff station is a railway station in Banff, Alberta, Canada. It was previously used by Royal Canadian Pacific, Rocky Mountaineer, Canadian Pacific Railway and Via Rail. The station is on a Canadian Pacific Kansas City line.

The station was originally built for the Canadian Pacific Railway, serving the railway's Banff Springs Hotel. The station was opened in 1910 and declared a heritage railway station by the federal government in 1991.

At some point before 2024, the station was closed down, with Rocky Mountaineer service now serving the Banff Train Siding at 98 Mount Norquay Road.

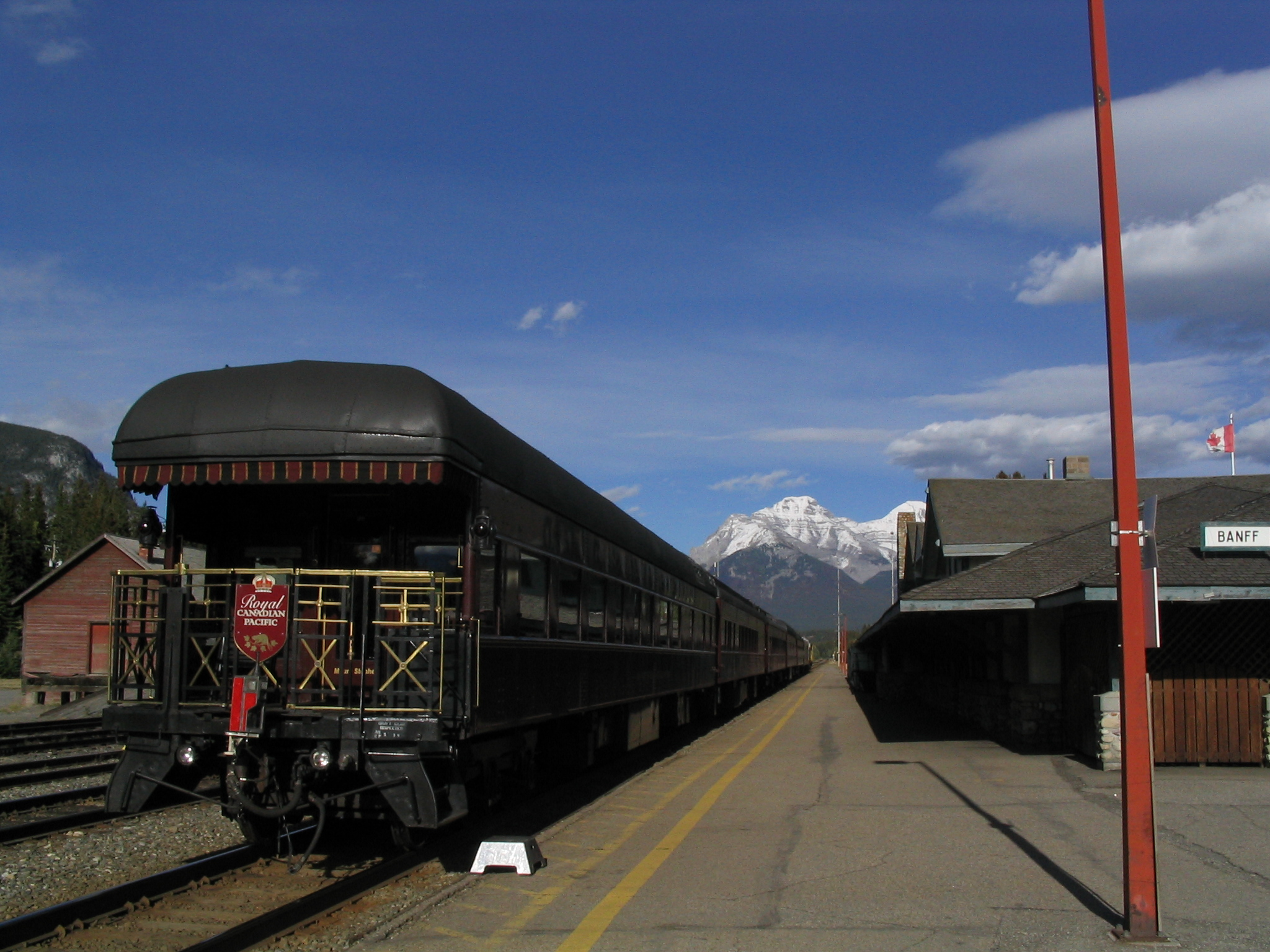
The Royal Canadian Pacific at Banff

== See also ==
- List of designated heritage railway stations of Canada
