= Kamloops station =

Railway station in Kamloops, Canada

Kamloops
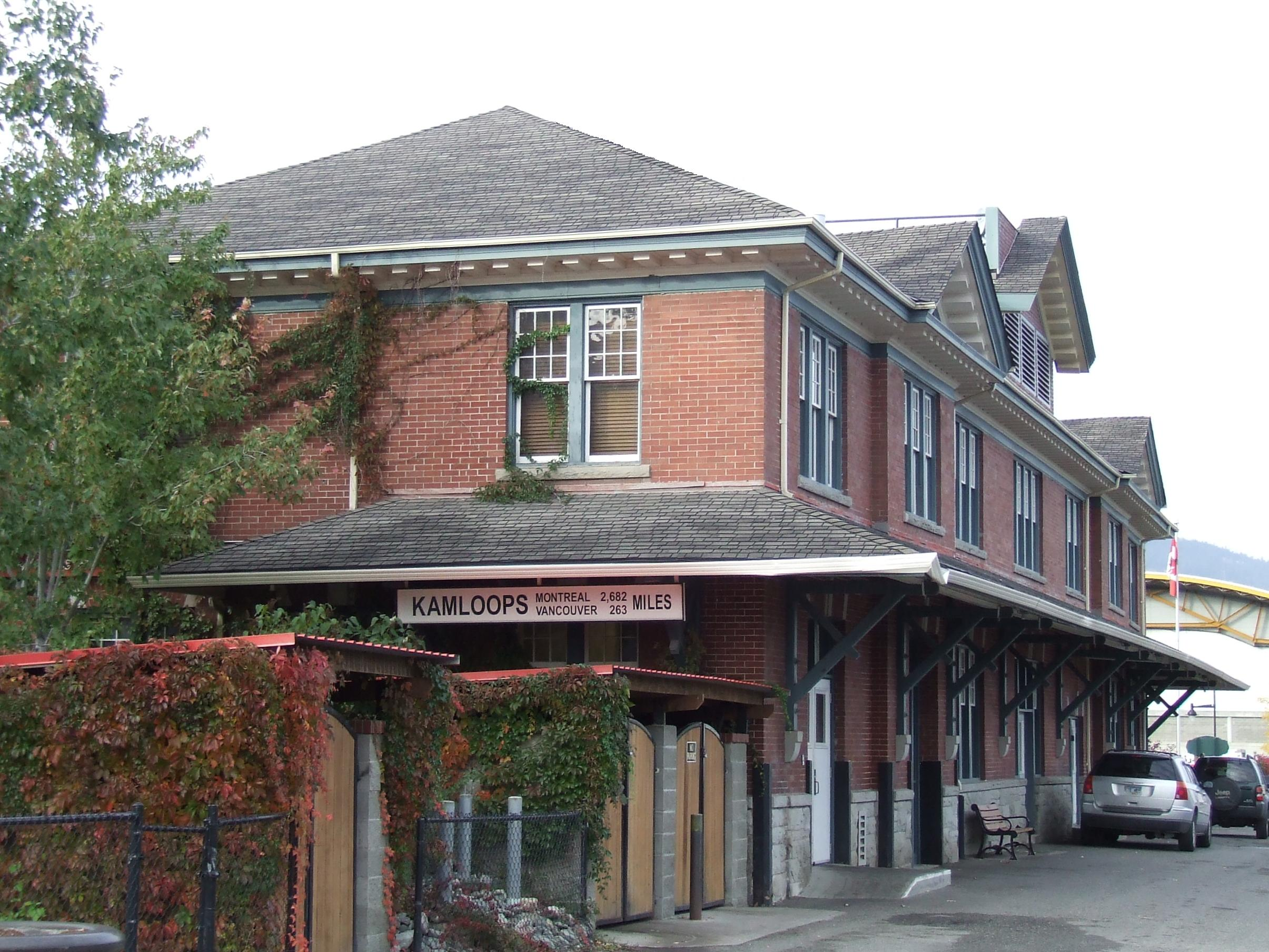
- The historic railway station

General information
- Location: 500 Lorne St, Kamloops, British Columbia; Canada
- Coordinates: 50°40′43.6″N 120°19′47″W

Construction
- Structure type: 2 storey heritage building

History
- Opened: 1927
- Original company: Canadian National Railway; Via Rail

Former services
Preceding station	Canadian National Railway	Following station
Kamloops Junction Terminus	Kamloops Branch	Kelowna Terminus
Other former services
Preceding station	Rocky Mountaineer	Following station
Vancouver Terminus	First Passage to the West	Lake Louise towards Banff
Vancouver Terminus	Journey Through the Clouds	Jasper Terminus
Vancouver towards Seattle	Coastal Passage	Lake Louise towards Banff
Vancouver towards Seattle	Coastal Passage	Jasper Terminus
Location
- Location within British Columbia Location within Canada

Kamloops station is a railway station in Kamloops, British Columbia, Canada. It previously served as the overnight stopover point for the Rocky Mountaineer train service to Jasper and Banff from Vancouver.

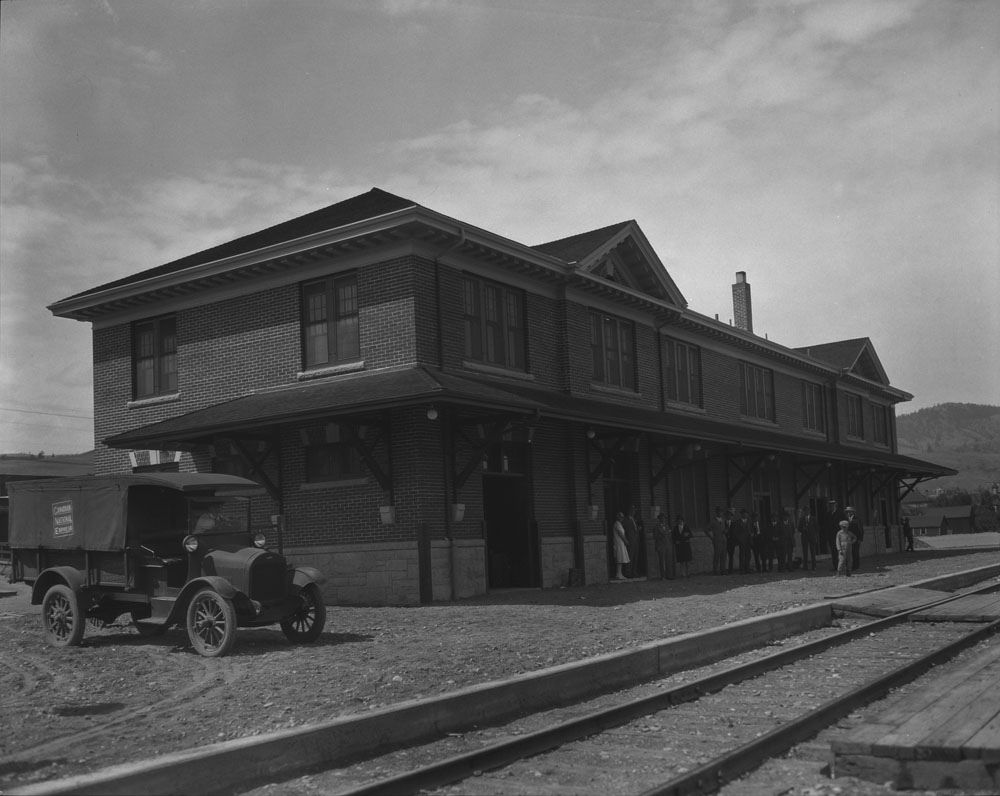
The station circa 1927

The station was originally built for Canadian National Railway The station was declared a Heritage Railway Station in 1992. The station building was restored and was previously home to a location of The Keg. As of 2021, it was planned that it would be remodelled as a local distillery and restaurant, however these plans fell through due to a lack of investment. It now hosts Twisted Steak steakhouse.

The Kamloops Heritage Railway offers special excursion steam trains at various times through the year, trains depart from the station with tickets sold from their ticket office at 5-510 Lorne Street near the station.

At some point before 2024, the station was closed down, with Rocky Mountaineer service now serving the Kamloops Train Siding at 525 CN Road.

== See also ==
- List of designated heritage railway stations of Canada
