= Pacific Central Station =

Railway station in Vancouver, Canada

Pacific Central
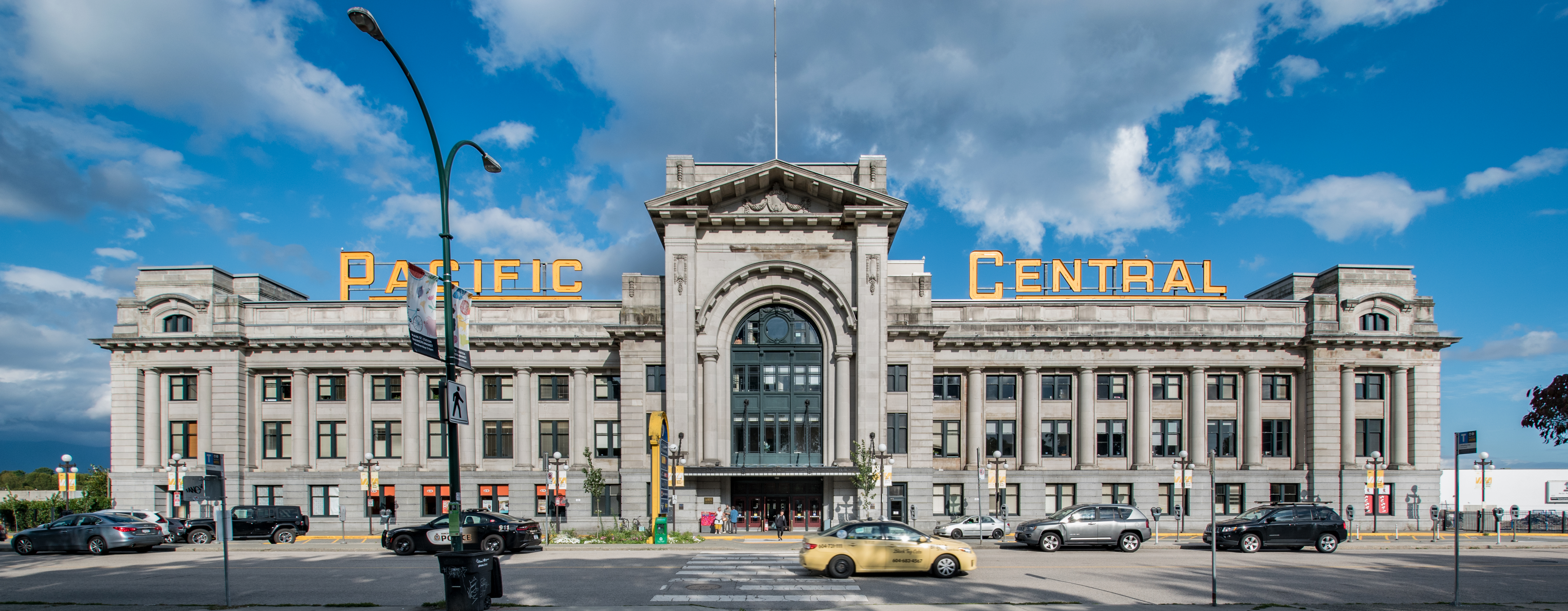

General information
- Location: 1150 Station Street; Vancouver, British Columbia; Canada
- Coordinates: 49°16′25″N 123°05′53″W
- Owner: Via Rail
- Platforms: 3 island platforms
- Tracks: 7
- Bus stands: 24
- Bus operators: Amtrak Thruway; BC Ferries Connector; Ebus; FlixBus; Greyhound Lines; Rider Express Transportation
- Connections: Main Street–Science World; TransLink: 3, 8, 19, 22, 23

Construction
- Accessible: Yes
- Architect: Pratt and Ross
- Architectural style: Beaux-Arts

Other information
- Status: Staffed station
- Station code: Via Rail: VCVR; Amtrak: VAC
- IATA code: XEA

History
- Opened: November 2, 1919
- Former names: Canadian National Railway Station; False Creek Station

Passengers
- FY 2024: 265,626 (Amtrak)

Services
Preceding station	Via Rail	Following station
Terminus	The Canadian	Mission Harbour toward Toronto
Terminus	The Canadian	Abbotsford One-way operation
Preceding station	Amtrak	Following station
Bellingham toward Portland	Amtrak Cascades	Terminus
Former services
Preceding station	Rocky Mountaineer	Following station
Terminus	First Passage to the West	Kamloops towards Banff
Terminus	Journey Through the Clouds	Kamloops towards Jasper
Seattle Terminus	Coastal Passage	Vancouver towards Banff or Jasper
Preceding station	Canadian National Railway	Following station
Terminus	Main Line	New Westminster toward Montreal
Preceding station	Via Rail	Following station
Terminus	Super Continental	New Westminster toward Montreal
Preceding station	Great Northern Railway	Following station
New Westminster toward Seattle	Vancouver, BC – Seattle	Terminus

Heritage Railway Station (Canada)
- Designated: 1991
- Reference no.: 4527
Location
- Location within Greater Vancouver Regional District Location within British Columbia Location within Canada

Pacific Central Station is a railway station in Vancouver, British Columbia, Canada, which acts as the western terminus of Via Rail's cross-country The Canadian service to Toronto, Ontario, and the northern terminus of United States passenger railroad company Amtrak's Cascades service to Seattle, Washington, and Portland, Oregon. The station, which is also Vancouver's main intercity bus terminal, is wheelchair-accessible and is staffed with full Via services. The station is a candidate for the northern terminus of a possible future high-speed rail line being considered primarily by the US state of Washington.

== History ==
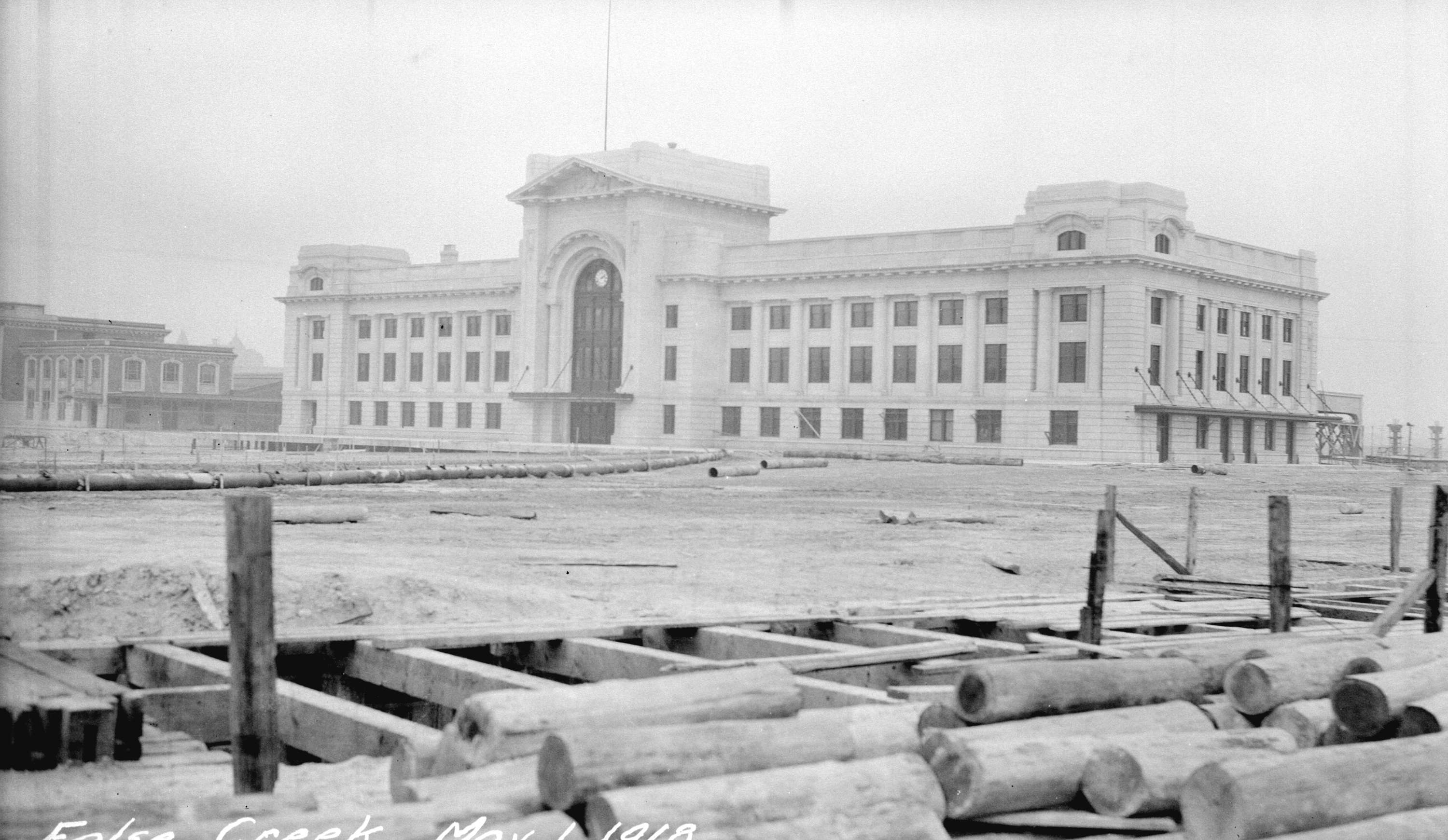
The station in 1918, then known as False Creek Station. This image shows the land around the building being filled in.

The station was built in 1917 by the Canadian Northern Railway as the terminus of its line to Edmonton. The station was built on reclaimed land that previously was planned for dredging to create a canal between False Creek and Burrard Inlet. It was originally named False Creek Station and was designed by the architecture firm Pratt and Ross. The station was dedicated on November 2, 1919, a day after the first Canadian National Railway (CNR) trains began using the station.

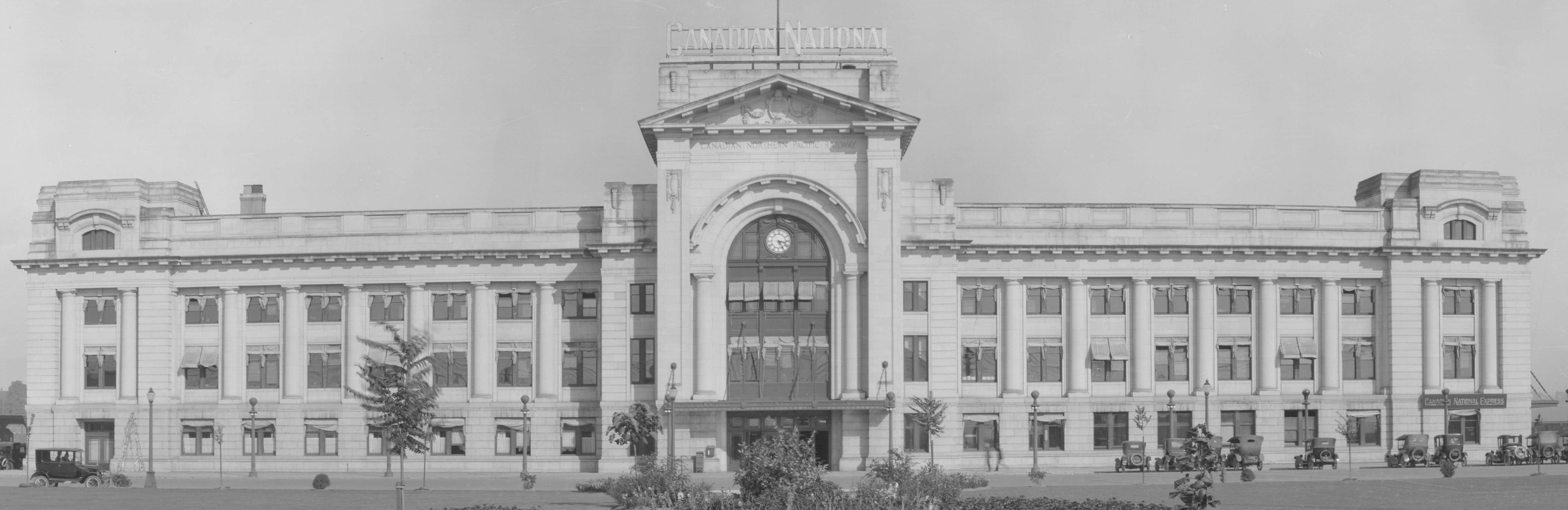
A 1924 view of the station, which sported a rooftop Canadian National sign above the central gable

In April 1962, Great Northern Railway closed its neighbouring Vancouver station and relocated its passenger operations to the CNR station, and the old station was razed in 1965. The railway (and its successor Burlington Northern Railroad) ran its International passenger service between Seattle and the CNR station until May 1, 1971. Amtrak then resumed the Seattle–Vancouver service as the Pacific International from July 1972 until September 30, 1981, when the service was eliminated due to budget cuts.

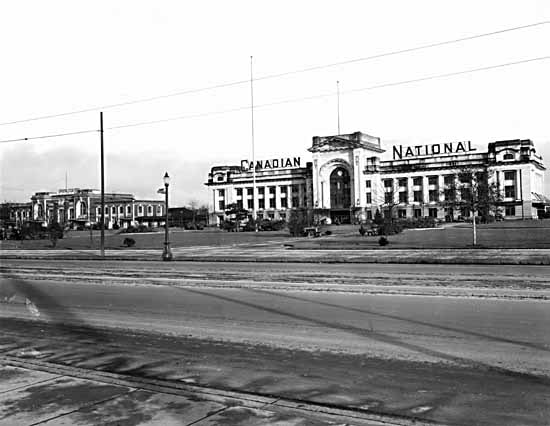
A 1933 photo, in which the original Canadian National sign was replaced by a larger sign that spanned the width of the building. The Great Northern Railway station is on the left.

In the late 1970s, the Canadian federal government reorganized passenger rail service, founding Via Rail to take control of money-losing passenger operations from CNR and Canadian Pacific Railway (CPR). In June 1979, Via Rail decided to consolidate its Vancouver operations at the CNR station. By the end of October 1979, the former CPR Waterfront station was closed, and CPR's legacy passenger services were transferred to the CNR station. In the first half of 1980, the Vancouver City Council designated the station and its rooftop neon sign as a heritage structure.

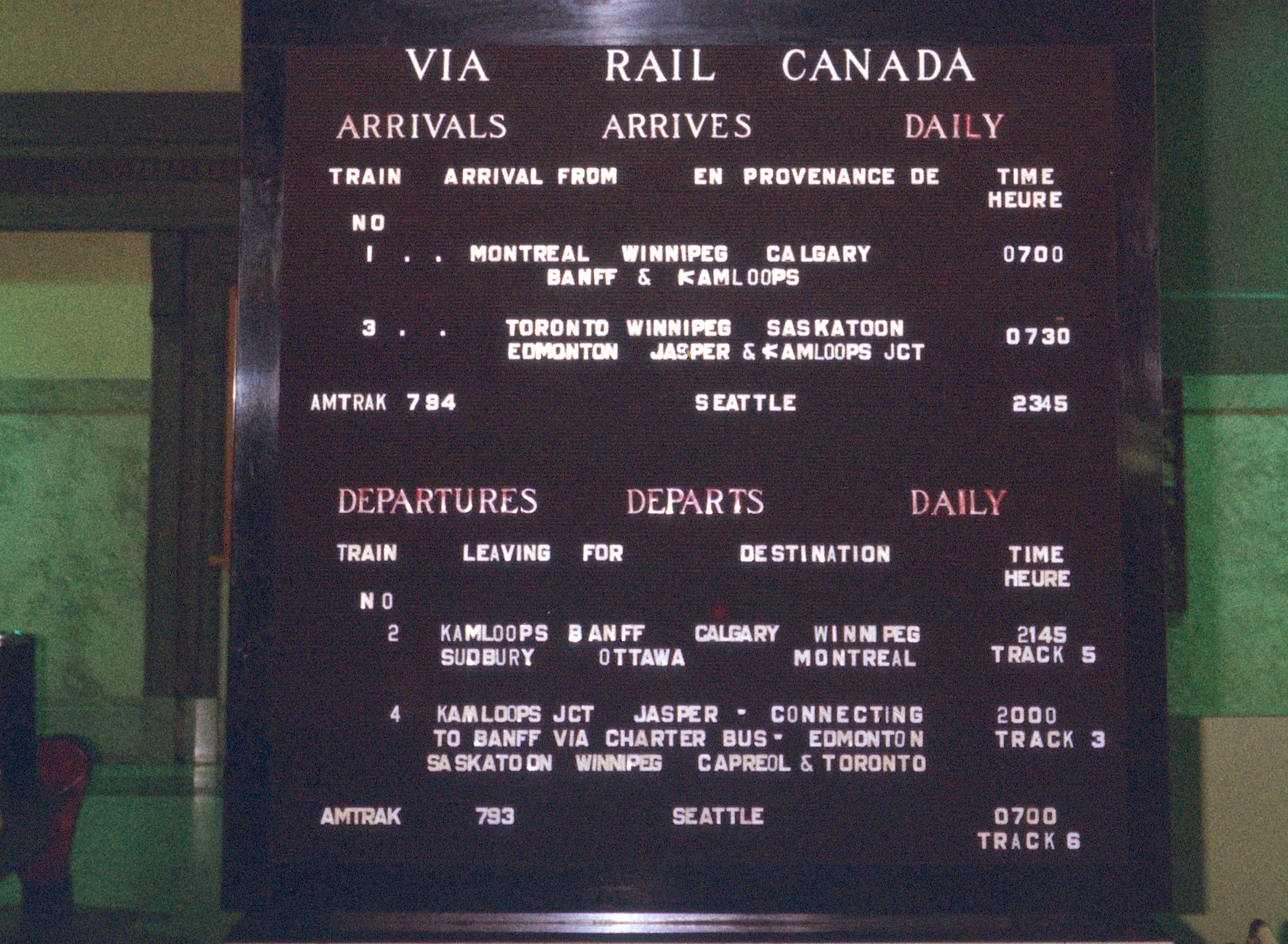
The station's arrivals and departures board in September 1981

In 1986, when Vancouver staged Expo 86, a world's fair to commemorate its centenary, Via Rail hosted a fair pavilion, spending CA$2.5 million to refurbish the station. The pavilion's 1,100-square-metre (12,000 sq ft) exhibit, which occupied about half of the station, featured 150 years of Canadian passenger rail history. The station also added Café de la Gare, an 800-seat outdoor restaurant in front of the station's main entrance, which offered views of the main fairgrounds site along False Creek. Although the station hosted the only free Expo 86 pavilion, its offsite location one block away from the main fairgrounds contributed to its meagre attendance numbers relative to other pavilions. The station's exterior appearance was modified for the event, including the installation of large VIA logos to cover the existing neon signage. This look established Via Rail as separate from CNR at Expo 86, as CNR sponsored the first 3D animation on an IMAX movie screen at the Canada pavilion along Burrard Inlet, and CNR also hosted its own outdoor pavilion on the main fairgrounds site.

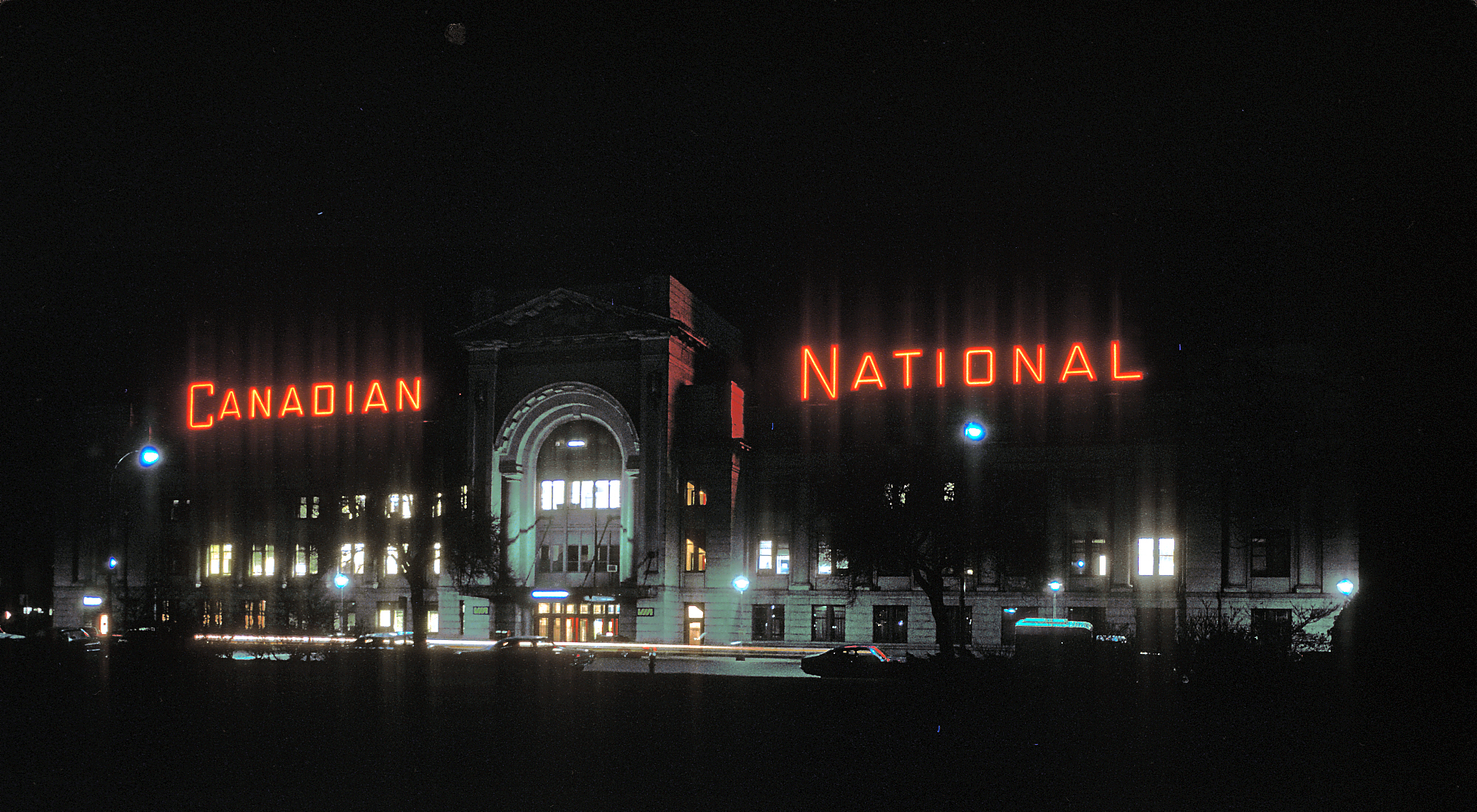
A nighttime view of the station in December 1981 (from the Roger Puta collection). Via Rail had taken over rail passenger service from CNR, but Vancouver had declared CNR's old rooftop sign as a heritage structure, so Via Rail could not replace the sign with its own branding at that time.

In 1988, Via Rail introduced the Rockies by Daylight seasonal tourist services, which had trains leave the station, stop at Kamloops for an overnight hotel stay, and then depart the next day to the ski resort town of Banff or Jasper in the Alberta Rockies. The services were renamed Rocky Mountaineer in 1989. In 1990, federal government cutbacks to the Via Rail budget led to the services being sold to private ownership. The Vancouver-area owners were initially known as Mountain Vistas Railtour Services, which later in 1990 changed its operating firm name to Great Canadian Railtour Company and marketed the services as Rocky Mountaineer Railtours.

In January 1991, Greyhound Canada announced that it wanted to relocate its Vancouver bus terminal in Larwill Park, which included the operations of other bus companies that sublet its space, to the former CNR station. The deal was finalized in September 1991. CNR would sell the train station to Via Rail, which had leased it from CNR since 1978, so that Via Rail could renovate the station. CNR would also lease 3,280 square metres (35,300 sq ft) of land behind the station to Greyhound, which would build a passenger shelter and bus stalls for its own operations and those of the other bus companies using that space. Station remodelling and bus station preparations would cost $8.4 million, of which Greyhound would spend $3.5 million. $3 million of the renovation cost went to seismic reinforcement. With the addition of the bus terminal, the station gained about 50 bus departures per day compared to a single train departure every other day. Also, the estimated 1.3 million yearly bus passengers would make up over 90% of the station's total passenger traffic.

In connection with the station's upcoming ownership transfer and transformation into an intermodal facility, The Province newspaper held a contest in 1991 to rename the station, and Pacific Central Station was chosen. The station was designated a federal heritage railway station in late 1991 under the Heritage Railway Stations Protection Act. The facility renaming became official in 1993, after the building refurbishment was completed. However, because Vancouver had previously named the rooftop sign as a heritage structure, the neon Canadian National signage could not be updated to the new name as part of the building renovation. Via Rail eventually persuaded the city to allow the swapping of the existing signage with the words Pacific Central using the same styling, and in December 1994, the new name appeared on the roof. The old Canadian National signage was relocated to a railway museum in Squamish, British Columbia, where, as of 2025, it is held in storage at the Railway Museum of British Columbia.

Cross-border service returned in 1995 when Amtrak introduced the Mount Baker International, which was later folded into the modern-day Cascades brand.

Also in 1995, the operating firm headquarters for the Rocky Mountaineer Railtours services relocated from its North Vancouver location to the first floor of the station. However, in 2004 the Vancouver terminus relocated from Pacific Central Station to a temporary station. In 2005, the rebranded Rocky Mountaineer Vacations services moved into Rocky Mountaineer Station, and the operating company subsequently moved its corporate headquarters out of Pacific Central Station.

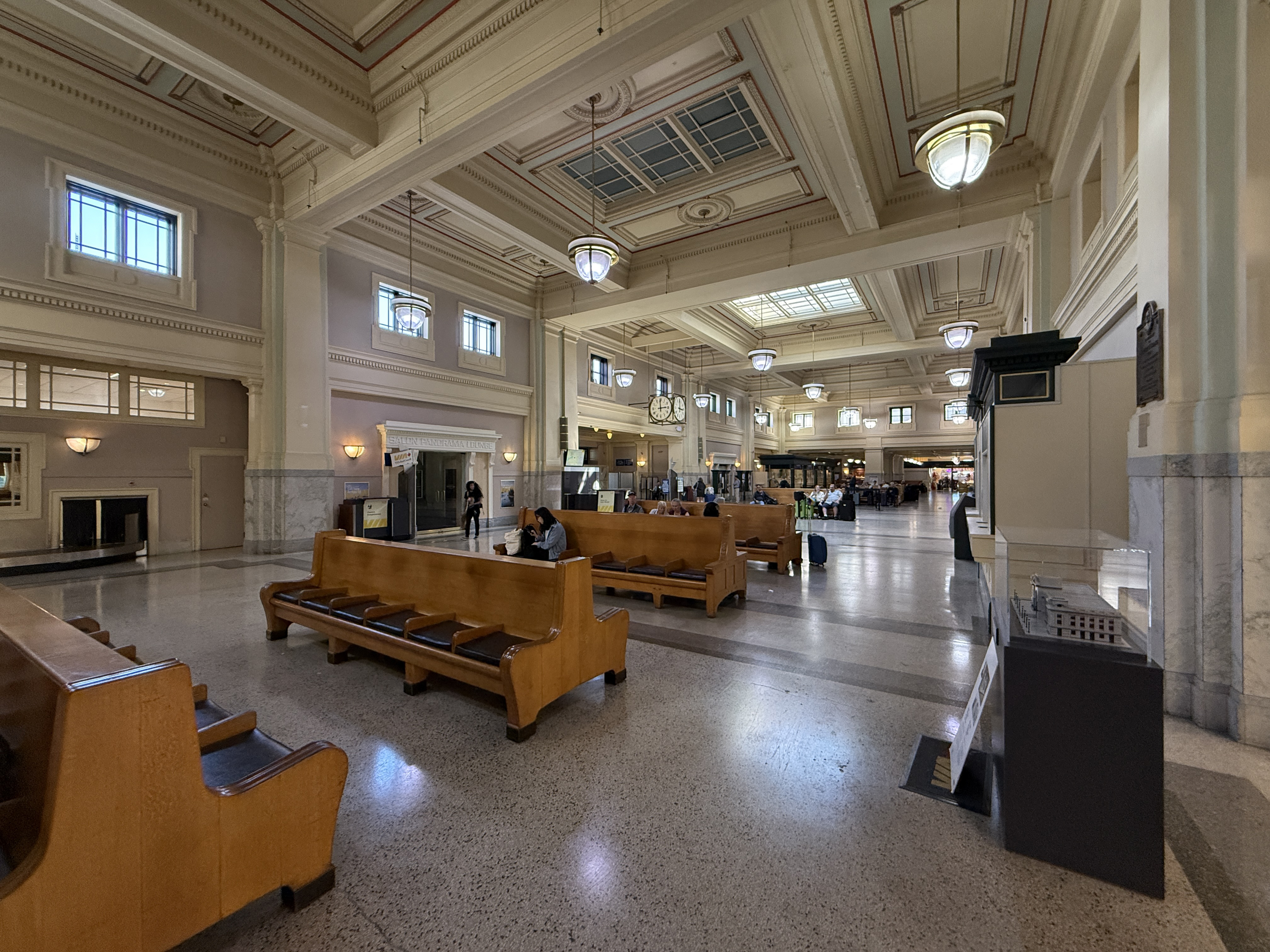
Interior of the station in 2026

On November 8, 2010, the Canadian government announced a $5.1 million plan to rebuild parts of the station, including refurbishing windows, masonry, and the roof of the building.

Rocky Mountaineer returned to Pacific Central Station in the 2010s, introducing the Coastal Passage service between Vancouver and Seattle with preview runs made in August 2013 and regularly scheduled service that started on May 10, 2014. (Because of United States border regulations, the Canadian stop had to be located at Vancouver's primary train station for cross-border travel instead of at Rocky Mountaineer Station.) Due to low ridership, the Coastal Passage service ended after the 2019 tourist season.

== Services ==
=== Rail ===
==== Amtrak Cascades ====
Amtrak Cascades provides two daily round trips between Vancouver and Seattle, Washington, with one daily train continuing to Portland, Oregon.

Because Pacific Central is the only stop in Canada, all Amtrak passengers are bound for the United States and go through United States border preclearance inside the station prior to boarding. Prior to June 2026, there was a brief 10-minute stop at the Peace Arch Border Crossing for agents to collect forms. The full customs and passport control preclearance facility at Pacific Central Station opened on June 8 and trains no longer have to stop at the border crossing for inspection. Canada-bound passengers go through Canadian customs at the station upon arrival; northbound trains travelling towards Pacific Central do not stop at the border. This is in contrast to Amtrak's international services on the East Coast (Adirondack to Montreal and Maple Leaf to Toronto), where passengers are processed by customs immediately after passing over the border.

To enable customs processing away from the border crossing, Amtrak trains are sequestered inside a secure caged area at Pacific Central Station. Additionally, trains make no stops in Canada other than at Pacific Central Station.

==== Via Rail Canadian ====
Via Rail's Canadian train offers twice-weekly cross-country service to Toronto via Edmonton, Saskatoon, and Winnipeg.

=== Bus ===
Pacific Central Station is Vancouver's main intercity bus terminal.

Bus company	Destinations
Amtrak Thruway (operated by Cantrail)	Seattle
BC Ferries Connector	Victoria (via Tsawwassen ferry terminal)
Ebus	Kelowna, Kamloops, Salmon Arm, Calgary, Prince George
FlixBus	Bellingham, Seattle
Greyhound Lines	Bellingham, Seattle
Rider Express	Kamloops, Revelstoke, Banff, Calgary and Edmonton

== Public transit ==
Pacific Central Station is immediately adjacent to Main Street–Science World station on the Expo Line of Greater Vancouver's SkyTrain rapid transit system.

== See also ==
- List of heritage buildings in Vancouver
- List of designated heritage railway stations of Canada
