= Rocky Mountaineer Station =

Railway station in British Columbia, Canada

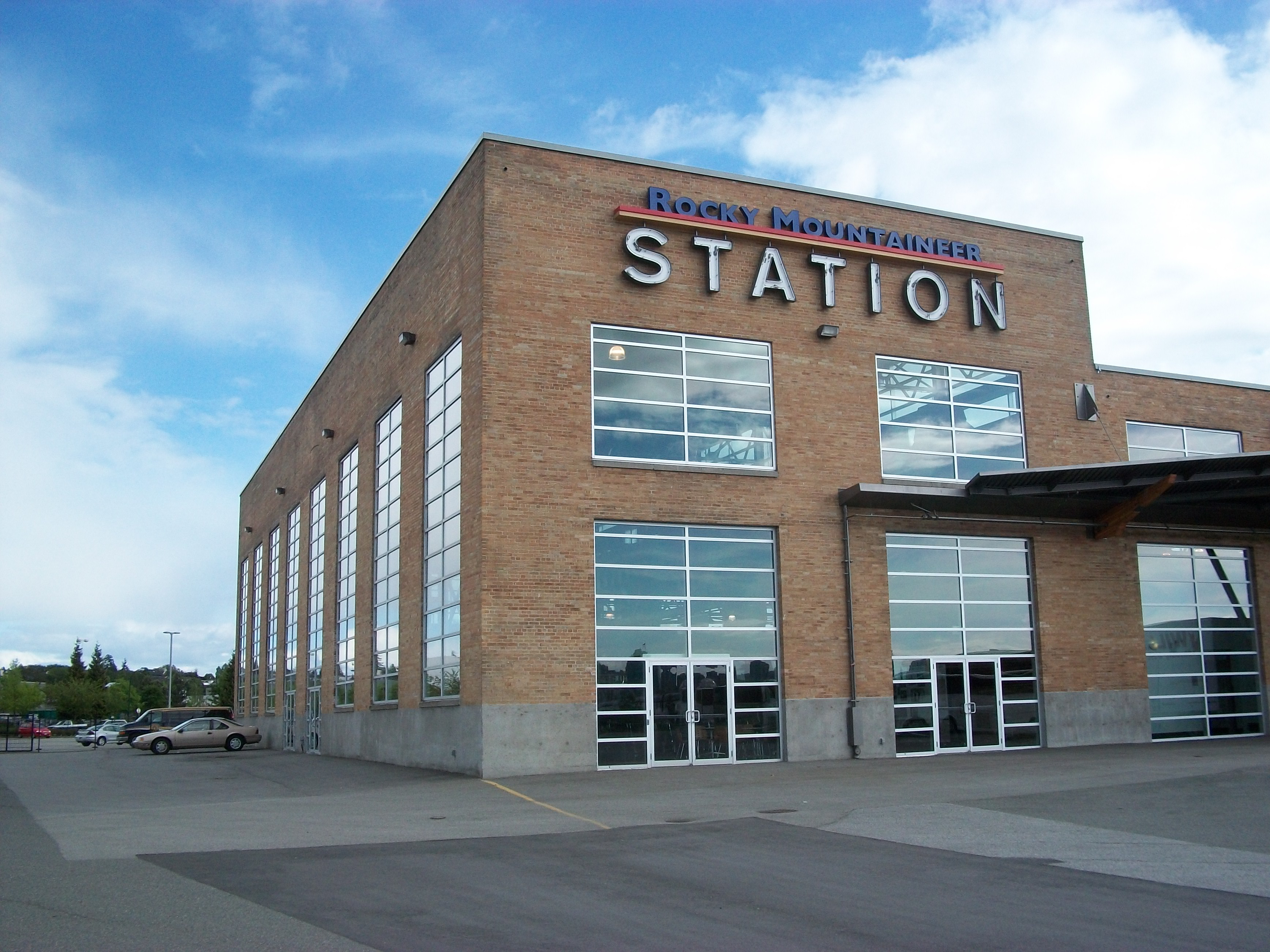

General information
- Location: 1755 Cottrell St, Vancouver, British Columbia; Canada
- Coordinates: 49°16′07″N 123°05′09″W

History
- Opened: 1954 (shed) 2005 (station)

Services
| Preceding station | Rocky Mountaineer | Following station |
|---|---|---|
| Terminus | First Passage to the West | Kamloops towards Banff |
| Terminus | Journey Through the Clouds | Kamloops towards Jasper |
Former services
| Preceding station | Rocky Mountaineer | Following station |
|---|---|---|
| Pacific Central (Vancouver) towards Seattle | Coastal Passage | Kamloops towards Banff or Jasper |
Location
- Location within Greater Vancouver Regional District Location within British Columbia Location within Canada

Rocky Mountaineer Station in Vancouver, British Columbia, Canada, is a railway station which acts as the western terminus of the Rocky Mountaineer train service to Jasper, Banff, and Calgary.

The previous Vancouver terminus for the Rocky Mountaineer was the nearby Pacific Central Station, which is also located within the False Creek flats. Before Rocky Mountaineer Station was completed in 2005, passenger services were moved to a 560-square-metre (6,000 sq ft) interim terminus in 2004.

The permanent Rocky Mountaineer Station was originally built for Canadian National Railway (CNR) as a locomotive repair shed. At a cost of CA$4 million, the building was renovated by Rocky Mountaineer Rail Tours into a railway station. The first train departed on April 17, 2005 from the 1,900-square-metre (20,000 sq ft) building on an 3.2-hectare (8-acre) site leased from CNR. The building has a waiting area that can seat up to 225 people, but it also can function as an event venue that can hold 1,530 attendees.

In February 2010, the east and west facades were updated with large signage identifying this structure as "Alberta Station", replacing the words "Rocky Mountaineer Station". The building reverted to its "Rocky Mountaineer" signs the first week of March 2010. The temporary signage change was related to the government of Alberta leasing a Rocky Mountaineer train for the 2010 Winter Olympics in Vancouver.

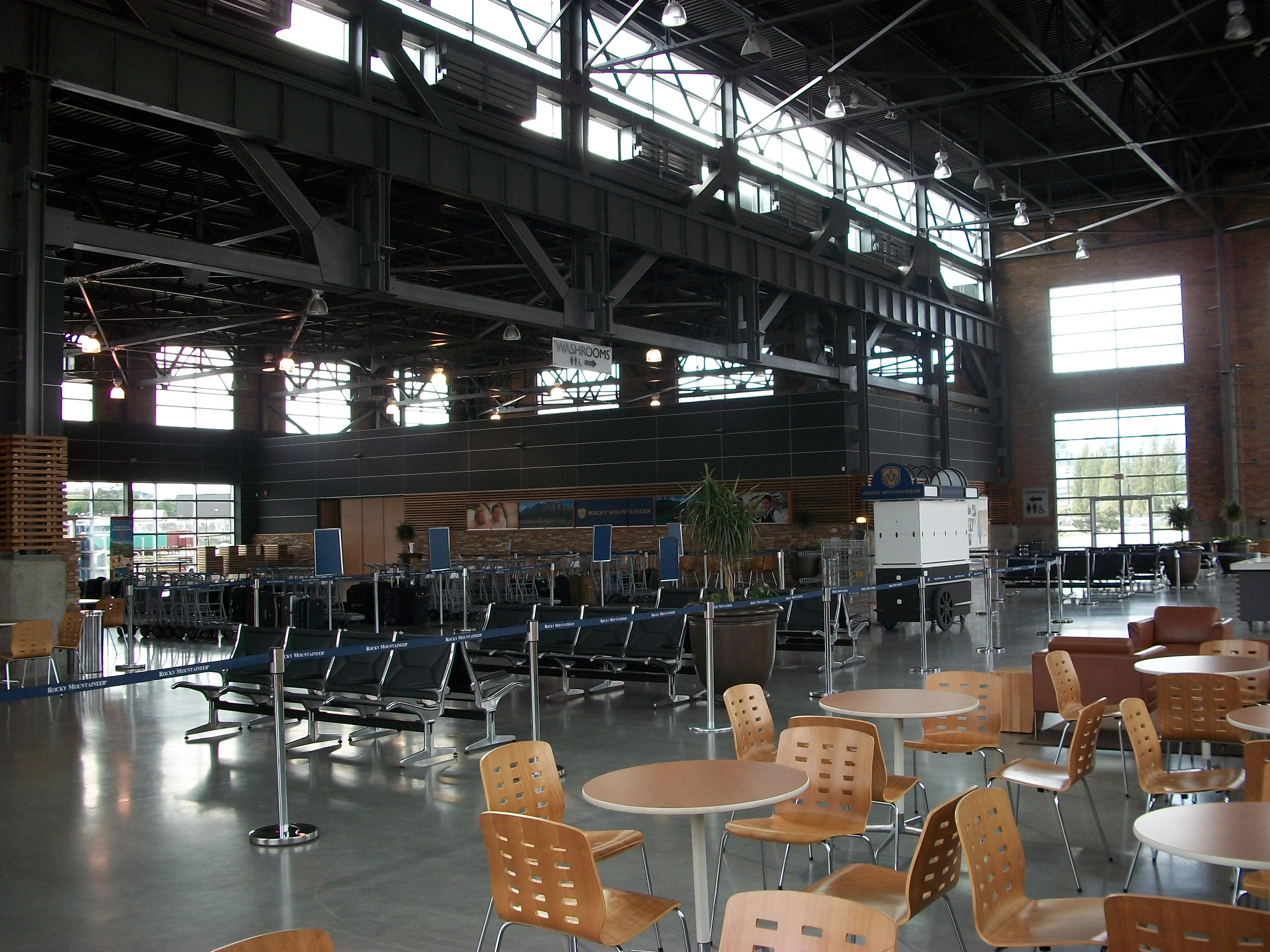
Rocky Mountaineer Station interior, May 2010
