= International (GN train) =

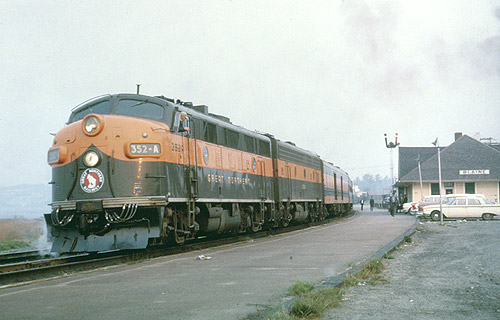
- The International at Blaine, Washington in 1965

Overview
- Service type: Inter-city rail
- Status: Discontinued
- Locale: British Columbia, Canada/Washington (state), United States
- Predecessor: Morning Puget Sounder; Afternoon Puget Sounder
- First service: June 18, 1950; 74 years ago
- Last service: April 18, 1970; 55 years ago
- Successor: Pacific International
- Former operator(s): Great Northern Railway (1950–1970); Burlington Northern Railroad (1970–1971)

Route
- Termini: Pacific Central Station, Vancouver, British Columbia; King Street Station, Seattle, Washington
- Stops: Six intermediate
- Distance travelled: 154 miles (248 km)
- Average journey time: 3 hours 55 minutes
- Service frequency: Daily
- Train number(s): Originally: 355/356, 357/360, 361/362; From Feb 1956: 357/358, 359/360, 361/362

Technical
- Track gauge: 1,435 mm (4 ft 8 1/2 in)

The International was a named passenger train originally operated by the Great Northern Railway between King Street Station, Seattle, Washington, and Pacific Central Station, Vancouver, British Columbia between 1950 and 1971.

== Background ==
In 1913, there were three pairs of trains operating on a Vancouver, BC to Portland, Oregon route in 12 to 16 1/2; with the overnight train carrying the name The Owl. In addition, there was a Vancouver–Seattle local, a Bellingham–Rockport local, and a Vancouver–New Westminster mixed. The depression took its toll on these services; through Vancouver to Portland services were discontinued, with the Seattle to Portland segment being pooled with Northern Pacific Railway and the Union Pacific Railroad from 1925.

By 1928, the Vancouver to Seattle service had been reduced to three pairs of trains: 356/357 The Owl, 358/359 International Limited, and 360 The Canadian and 355 The American. (Odd train numbers were westbound by timetable, southbound by compass, even numbers were eastbound by timetable, northbound by compass). By Spring 1937, The Owl had been discontinued, with 355/358 being limited stop and 359/360 the locals. This arrangement persisted through World War II unit 1946 when service was expanded to three pair of trains: 359/360 became the Morning Puget Sounder, 355/358 the Afternoon Puget Sounder (all limited stop) and 356/357 were restored as the unnamed locals.

In June 1950, the GN replaced both heavyweight Puget Sounders with three streamlined Internationals, although only two trainsets were needed, as each set made one-and-one-half round trips daily. In February 1956, the locals were discontinued, and the Internationals were renumbered.

In May 1960, the evening International was discontinued; the noon service became known as the afternoon service. There was an upswing of traffic during the Century 21 Exposition (the 1962 Seattle World's Fair); to cope with this extra traffic, the Great Northern bought several 56-seat coaches from the Chicago and North Western Railway that had become surplus after the discontinuation of some of the CNW's 400 trains. These were placed in GN's short-haul streamliners, which released long-haul coaches for the Empire Builder and the Western Star.

In 1966, the Great Northern took delivery of six EMD SDP40 locomotives for use on the Western Star; they were also used on the Internationals between the westbound Western Star’s arrival, and the eastbound departure. The following year, eight EMD SDP45 locomotives joined their ranks.

In June 1969, trains 357 and 358, the morning service was discontinued in Washington state, it was October before the Canadian authorities completed their approvals. In the meantime a Vancouver to White Rock, BC shuttle service operated, but the crew usually outnumbered the passengers – if there were any. Due to the schedules needed to maintain reasonable connections with the Empire Builder and the Coast Pool Trains, two trainsets were still required.

Trains 359 and 360 continued through the Burlington Northern Railroad merger of March 1970; BN renumbered them as trains 193 and 194. They finally expired fourteen months later as one of many trains discontinued on the startup of Amtrak on May 1, 1971. Amtrak would later operate the Pacific International over the same route 1972–1981. Service returned again in 1995 as the Mount Baker International, operated by Amtrak in partnership with the Washington State Department of Transportation (WSDOT). Since 1998, the route has been part of the Amtrak Cascades service using leased Talgo Pendular equipment, with one round trip from Seattle to Vancouver and one from Portland to Vancouver.
