= Imperial Limited =

Passenger train in Canada

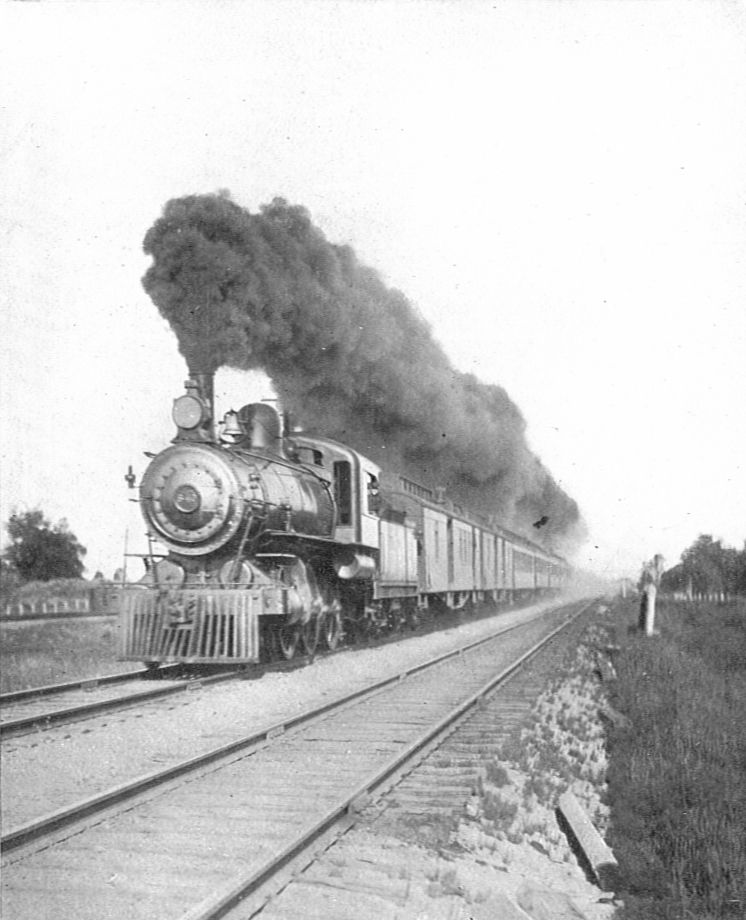
- Imperial Limited (1907)

Overview
- Service type: Inter-city rail
- Status: Discontinued
- Locale: Canada
- First service: June 18, 1899
- Last service: June 25, 1933
- Successor: The Dominion & The Canadian
- Former operator(s): Canadian Pacific Railway

Route
- Termini: Montreal; Vancouver
- Service frequency: 7 trains/week

Technical
- Track gauge: 1,435 mm (4 ft 8 1/2 in)
- Track owner(s): Canadian Pacific Railway

The Imperial Limited was the Canadian Pacific Railway's premier passenger train across Canada between Montreal, Quebec and Vancouver, British Columbia. It began operation June 18, 1899, seven days a week as a seasonal service supplementing the six days per week eastward Atlantic Express and its westward counterpart, the Pacific Express. It catered to travellers wanting to see the scenic Rocky Mountains and to vacation there. It was these well-to-do people that Sir William Cornelius Van Horne sought to attract in ever-increasing numbers, to travel to Canada, many on Canadian Pacific's ocean ships, then on Canadian Pacific's trains and to stay in Canadian Pacific's chalets at Banff Springs Hotel and Chateau Lake Louise. His famous quote was: "Since we can't export the scenery, we will have to import the tourists". And import them he did, in ever greater numbers.

Equipped with luxurious sleeping and dining cars it continued the emphasis on comfort that the CPR had offered travellers from the beginning in 1886. It went to year-round service in June 1911 at which time it replaced the original trains, Atlantic Express and Pacific Express.

In 1929 it was renamed simply Imperial due to the introduction of the seasonal Trans-Canada Limited which featured new steel equipment. The Trans-Canada Limited was doomed by the Great Depression which struck after only one season. It operated one more season in 1930 and was discontinued, its equipment redistributed or stored.

In the 1931 and 1932 summer season two trains were operated — The Imperial for Montreal–Vancouver service and The Dominion for Toronto–Vancouver.

The name Imperial was eliminated effective June 25, 1933, at which time The Dominion became the premier train. A numbered train continued in the Imperial's absence, lasting until April 28, 1956, at which time the loss of the Royal Mail contract ended the service.

The depression was ended by the coming of World War II, a time at which luxury train travel was not vital and many first-class cars were stored or modified for wartime needs. After the war, new equipment was essential to replace an over-worked fleet. A new material was now available instead of the heavy steel that had in use for decades: stainless steel, fashioned in a streamlined manner to appeal to the public and outfitted in the best tradition of CPR care for its customers.

This new equipment would be hauled by diesel locomotives, not the tried-and-true steam locomotives that had been at the head of the CPR's passenger trains since the beginning. Diesels had already begun handling The Dominion between Calgary, Alberta, and Revelstoke, British Columbia, in 1952.

April 24, 1955, saw the introduction of The Canadian as the flagship train between Montreal and Vancouver along with a Toronto–Sudbury section with through sleeping cars. At this time The Dominion became a secondary service between those points.

The Canadian continued until the takeover of CPR passenger train operations by Via Rail in October 1978, when the train was renamed simply Canadian. In 1990 it was re-routed, mostly over the Canadian National Railway, and service continues to this day.
