= Royal Canadian Pacific =

Luxury passenger excursion train

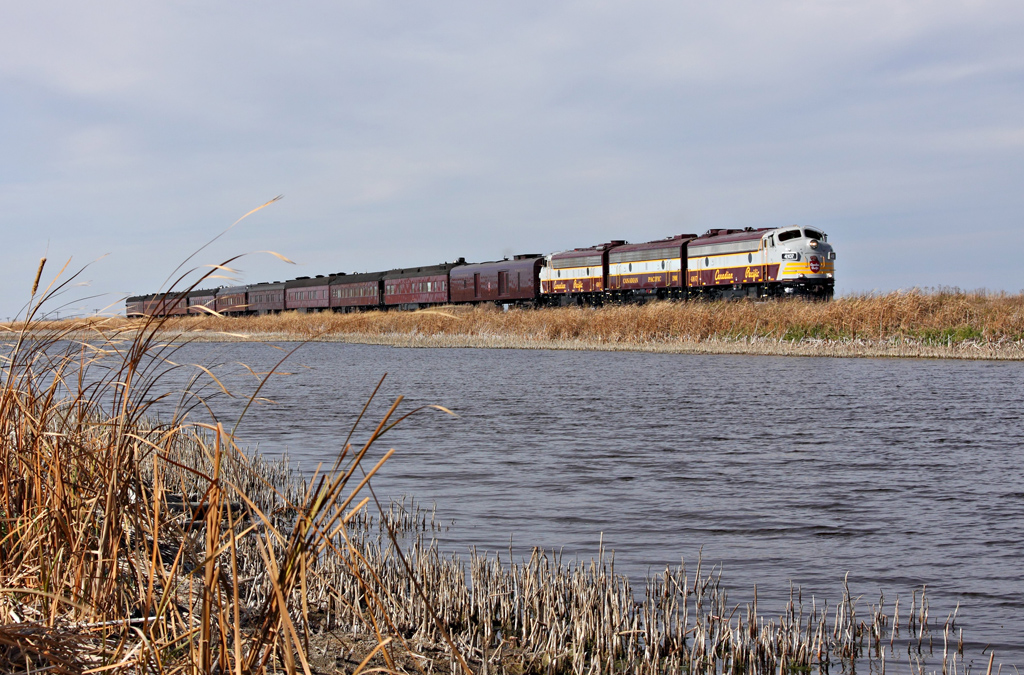
- The Royal Canadian Pacific in 2012

Overview
- Headquarters: Calgary, Alberta
- Reporting mark: CP
- Dates of operation: 2000–present

Technical
- Track gauge: 4 ft 8 1/2 in (1,435 mm) standard gauge

Other
- Website: royalcanadianpacific.com

The Royal Canadian Pacific is a luxury excursion passenger train operated by Mount Stephen Properties, a wholly owned subsidiary of the Canadian Pacific Railway and later CPKC Railway. It made its first run on June 7, 2000, after the CPR received the royal designation for the service from Elizabeth II, Queen of Canada.

The train operates seasonally from June to September, on CPR trackage through the Rocky Mountains in Alberta and British Columbia, and is available for private bookings only. All trains are based out of Calgary, Alberta, and use a facility built at the Ogden Headquarters with all the heritage equipment on display. A typical excursion is a 1,050 km (650 mi) route from Calgary through the Columbia River Valley and Crowsnest Pass, passing through Banff, Lake Louise and Kicking Horse Pass before returning to Calgary. Such a trip takes six days and five nights with no operating at night in order to preserve the sight-seeing of mountain scenery during the daylight hours. The train consists of up to eight luxury passenger cars built between 1916 and 1931, and is powered by restored EMD FP9 first-generation diesel-electric locomotives (two A units and one B unit).

== See also ==
- Canadian Pacific Railway: Royal trains
- List of Canadian organizations with royal patronage
- List of heritage railways in Canada
- Royal and viceroyal transport in Canada
