= Pacific International =

Passenger train

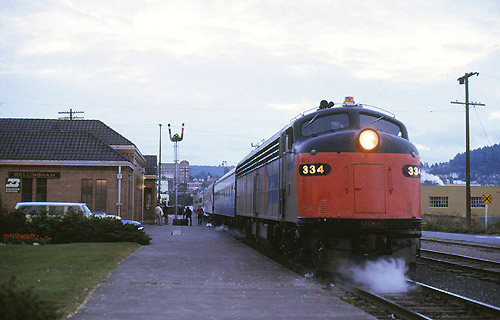
- The Pacific International at Bellingham in 1973

Overview
- Predecessor: International
- First service: July 17, 1972
- Last service: September 30, 1981
- Former operator: Amtrak

Route
- Termini: Vancouver, B.C., Canada; Seattle, Washington, U.S.
- Stops: 6
- Distance travelled: 156 miles (251 km)
- Average journey time: 4 hours, 30 minutes
- Service frequency: Daily
- Train number: 793/794

On-board services
- Catering facilities: Cafe car

The Pacific International was a passenger train operated by Amtrak between Seattle, Washington and Vancouver, British Columbia. It was Amtrak's first international train service, operating from 1972 until 1981.

== History ==
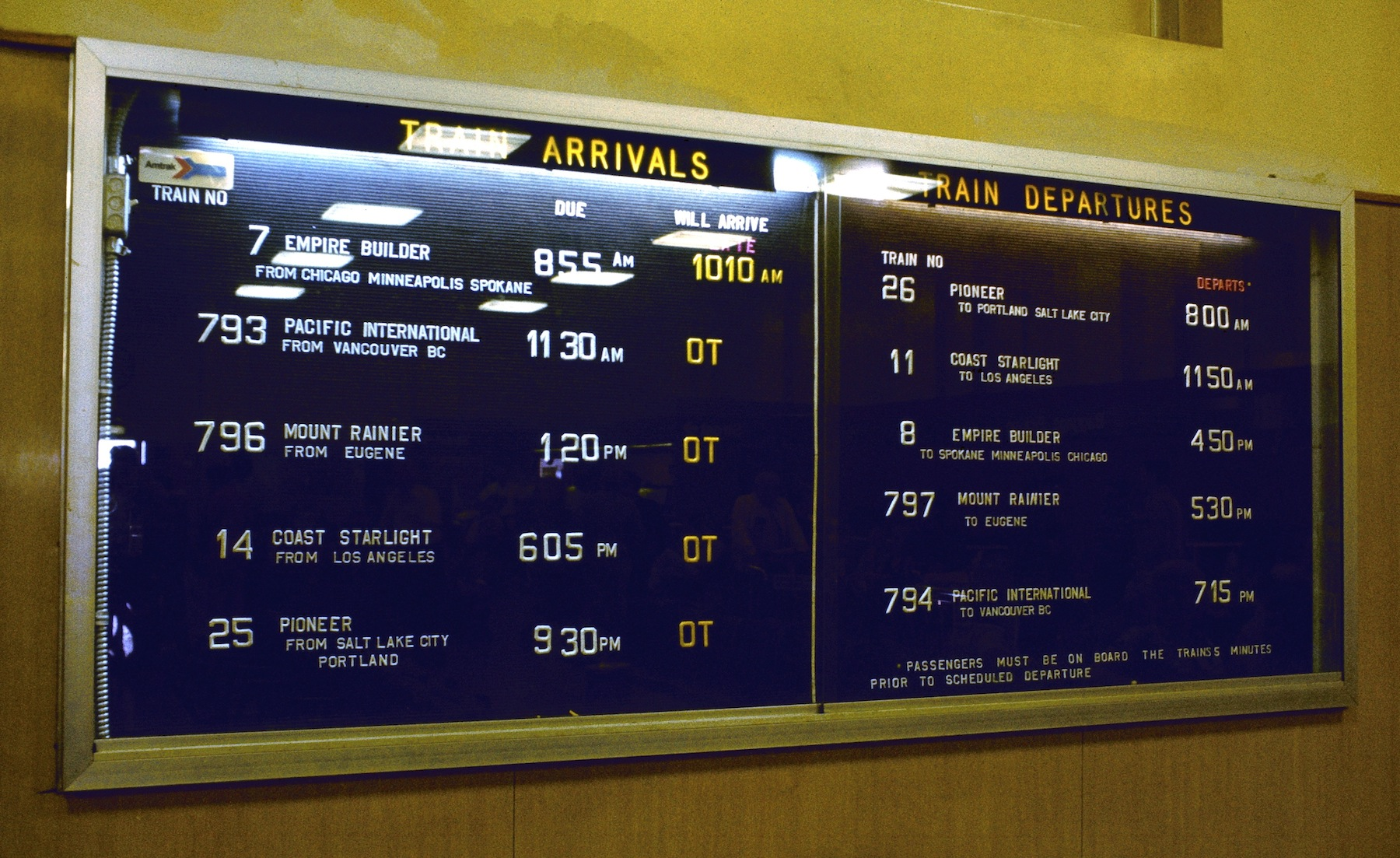
The departure board at King Street Station (Seattle) in 1981, listing the Pacific International

Amtrak did not retain any cross-border services when it assumed control of most intercity passenger trains in the United States on May 1, 1971. As part of its 1972 appropriation for Amtrak the United States Congress directed that $2 million be used for the establishment of service to Vancouver, Montreal (the Montrealer), and Nuevo Laredo (the Inter-American). The Burlington Northern Railroad's International had served the Seattle–Vancouver route up until the creation of Amtrak, and resuming service posed no significant challenges.

The first Pacific International, Amtrak's first international train, ran on July 17, 1972. The train was scheduled to connect with the Los Angeles–Seattle Coast Starlight in both directions. Initially, the route had intermediate stops in New Westminster, White Rock, British Columbia, Blaine, Washington, Bellingham, Mount Vernon-Burlington, Everett, and Edmonds. In mid-May 1973, the United States Customs and Immigration Service began requiring off-train inspection of southbound passengers at the Canada–United States border, after investigative journalist Jack Anderson reported that Vancouver was being used as a U.S. gateway for drugs and illegal immigration. Canadian inspection was still conducted on board the train for northbound passengers who crossed the border. Full onboard border inspection was re-established in May 1974. By the first half of 1975, the White Rock stop had been eliminated.

The route was suspended for about 4 months because of a runaway barge collision with the New Westminster Bridge on December 26, 1975. Amtrak initially attempted to run trains between Seattle and White Rock or Blaine, then using buses over the remaining route to or from Vancouver. However, the plan was soon scrapped due to the difficulty of servicing the trains at the interim terminus. Amtrak subsequently ran buses as a substitute over the full Seattle–Vancouver corridor until the bridge was fixed.

On July 19, 1976, newly manufactured Amfleet cars debuted on the route. On June 13, 1979, Amtrak began using double-deck Superliner train coaches in place of the single-deck Amfleets on certain other trains in the Pacific Northwest and planned to make the same change soon to the Pacific International. Superliner service on the Pacific International began in mid-August 1979, after a short delay because of damage to the New Westminster Bridge from another barge ramming incident.

On October 28, 1979, the southbound Pacific International had a schedule change. Previously, the train left at 6:05 am from Vancouver to arrive in Seattle at 10:50 am, allowing a connection to a Coast Starlight departure at 11:05 am that went as far as San Diego, California. Instead, the train began departing from Vancouver at 11:50 am and arriving in Seattle at 5:00 pm to connect with a Mount Rainier departure at 5:30 pm that terminated in Portland, Oregon. In the second quarter of 1980, the schedule was reverted to an early morning departure to connect again with the Coast Starlight.

On paper, the Pacific International should have been a success. Rail service had operated between Seattle and Vancouver for most of the 20th century. However, the train struggled to attract riders throughout its history. In 1975 the United States Department of Transportation said it was the worst performer in the system, with a deficit of 47 cents per passenger mile. Critics of the train noted the influence of Senator Warren Magnuson (D-Washington) in establishing the service. In early 1979, Secretary of Transportation Brock Adams proposed eliminating 43% of Amtrak's route network, and the Pacific International was on the chopping block. In the end Congress agreed to fewer, though still significant, cuts, and the Pacific International survived for another two years. Amtrak discontinued the Pacific International on September 30, 1981, as part of another restructuring.

After its discontinuance Vancouver service did not return until the inauguration of the Mount Baker International in 1995. This route was folded into the Amtrak Cascades brand in 1998, and still exists today with two daily round trips, one from Seattle to Vancouver and one from Portland to Vancouver.
