= Rocky Mountaineer =

Canadian rail tour service

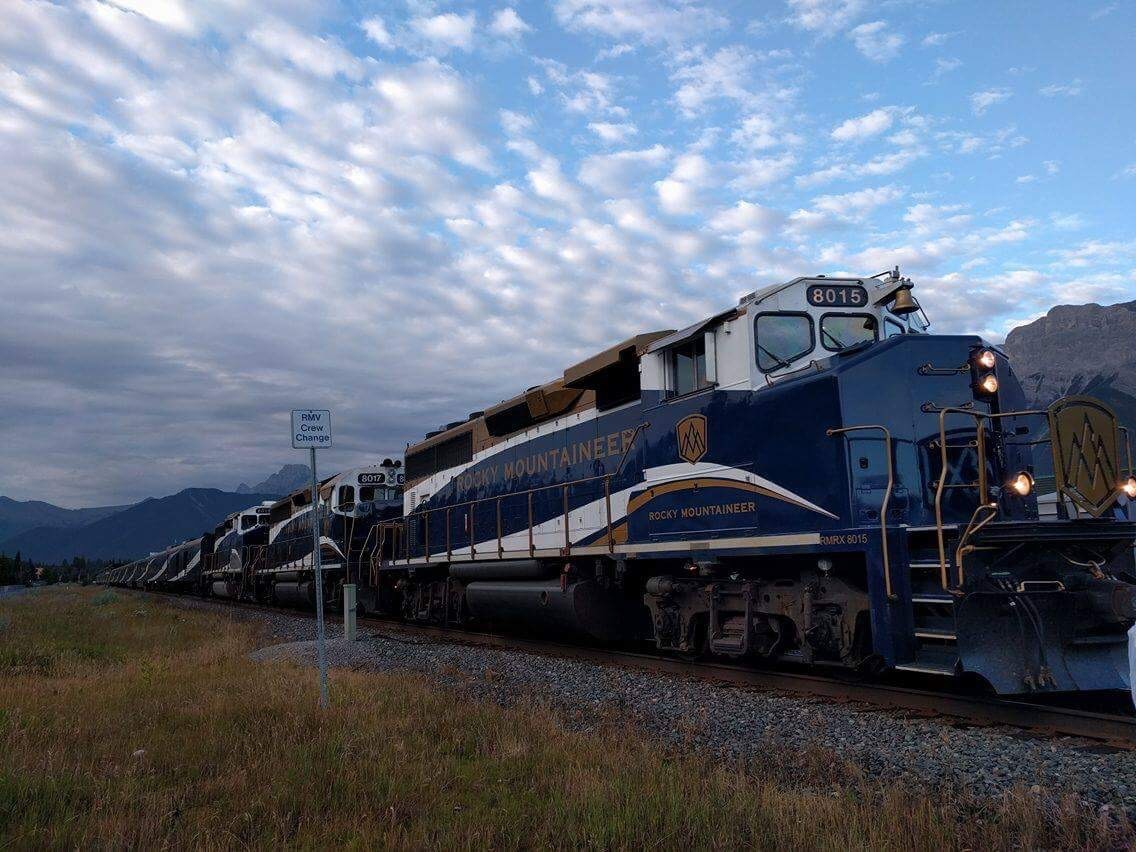

Overview
- Parent company: Great Canadian Railtour Company Ltd.
- Headquarters: Vancouver, British Columbia, Canada
- Reporting mark: RMRX
- Locale: British Columbia and Alberta, Canada; Colorado and Utah, U.S.
- Dates of operation: May 27, 1990–present

Technical
- Track gauge: 1,435 mm (4 ft 8 1/2 in) standard gauge

Other
- Website: www.rockymountaineer.com

The Rocky Mountaineer is a Canadian railtour service owned by the Great Canadian Railtour Company Ltd. that is based in Vancouver, British Columbia that operates luxury scenic trains on three routes across British Columbia and Alberta. A US affiliate, American Rocky Mountaineer, LLC (DBA Canyon Spirit) operates a fourth route across Colorado and Utah.

== History ==
=== Via Rail Canada ===
The Rocky Mountaineer concept was created by Harry Holmes, a railroad engineer, and Pat Crowley, a tourism entrepreneur, both of Jasper, Alberta. Together they developed a business plan which they presented to Via Rail prior to Expo 86. It was designed as an all-sightseeing train pulled by Canadian National steam locomotive No. 6060 in the Canadian Rockies. Originally, it began as a once-weekly Via Rail Canada daytime service between Vancouver, Calgary, and Jasper. The first departure was on May 22, 1988, with a special train for the travel industry. Soon, another one was made for the traveling public on June 9, 1988, called the Canadian Rockies by Daylight. To maximize scenic views, this service operated only during the day, with an overnight stop in Kamloops. These were express services, with no intermediate stops.

On June 4, 1989, Via began its second season of the service, renaming the service the Rocky Mountaineer. The final summer Rocky Mountaineer (under Via Rail branding) departed Calgary and Jasper was on October 12, 1989, and arrived in Vancouver on the 13th. Rocky Mountaineer was removed from schedules and marketing in May 1990. After two financially unsuccessful seasons, there was to be a change in approach. The Federal Government decided to see if the private sector could do a better job. The then Minister of Transport and Minister of Finance Michael Wilson decided to sell off the route, equipment, branding and book of business in the fall of 1989. In early November, advertisements were taken out in a number of newspapers soliciting interest in the Rocky Mountaineer.

=== Private operation of the Rocky Mountaineer ===
The federal government curtailed the subsidies to Via Rail in 1989, dramatically reducing services (especially the transcontinental service). Rocky Mountaineer was a tourist service, and as such the government felt the funds could be better spent on other higher priorities. They asked (at the time) Via Rail and CN Rail CEO Ron Lawless to organize the sale of the route, equipment and book of business to the private sector. Marketing for the Rocky Mountaineer sale began on November 12, 1989, and the process was overseen by recently retired CN executive Charles Armstrong. Submissions of interest demonstrating financial and operational capabilities were required by January 15, 1990. Initially there were 20 interested parties but after phase one of the bidding process, that group was reduced to three parties left to make a decision. One bidder was Westours Holland America, subsidiary of Carnival Cruise Line. The other two were a group of Via Rail executives and a Western Canadian entrepreneur.

In March 1990, following the bidding process, the route's equipment, book of business, 12 coaches, two baggage cars, along with various equipment and branding, were sold to Mountain Vistas Railtour Services Ltd., a subsidiary of Vancouver businessman Peter R.B. Armstrong's Armstrong Hospitality Group Ltd. The inaugural train journey took place on May 27, 1990.

Following the success of its early operations, Rocky Mountaineer expanded its fleet and routes throughout the 1990s and 2000s. The company became a cornerstone of Canada's luxury tourism industry, drawing travelers from over 30 countries and contributing significantly to the economies of Western Canadian communities along its routes.

== Awards ==
As of 2025, Rocky Mountaineer has received numerous international awards for service excellence and tourism innovation. The company has won thirteen World Travel Awards, including World's Leading Travel Experience by Train eight times.

== Legacy and influence ==
Since its privatization in 1990, the Rocky Mountaineer has played a key role in redefining luxury train travel in North America. Its success demonstrated that high-end, daylight sightseeing services could be commercially viable without government subsidy, influencing tourism rail concepts across Canada and the United States. The company's model has inspired similar scenic operations worldwide, including the development of routes in the U.S Southwest such as Rockies to the Red Rocks. Tourism analysts and travel writers often cite the Rocky Mountaineer as a benchmark for combing hospitality standards with heritage railway experiences.

== Equipment ==
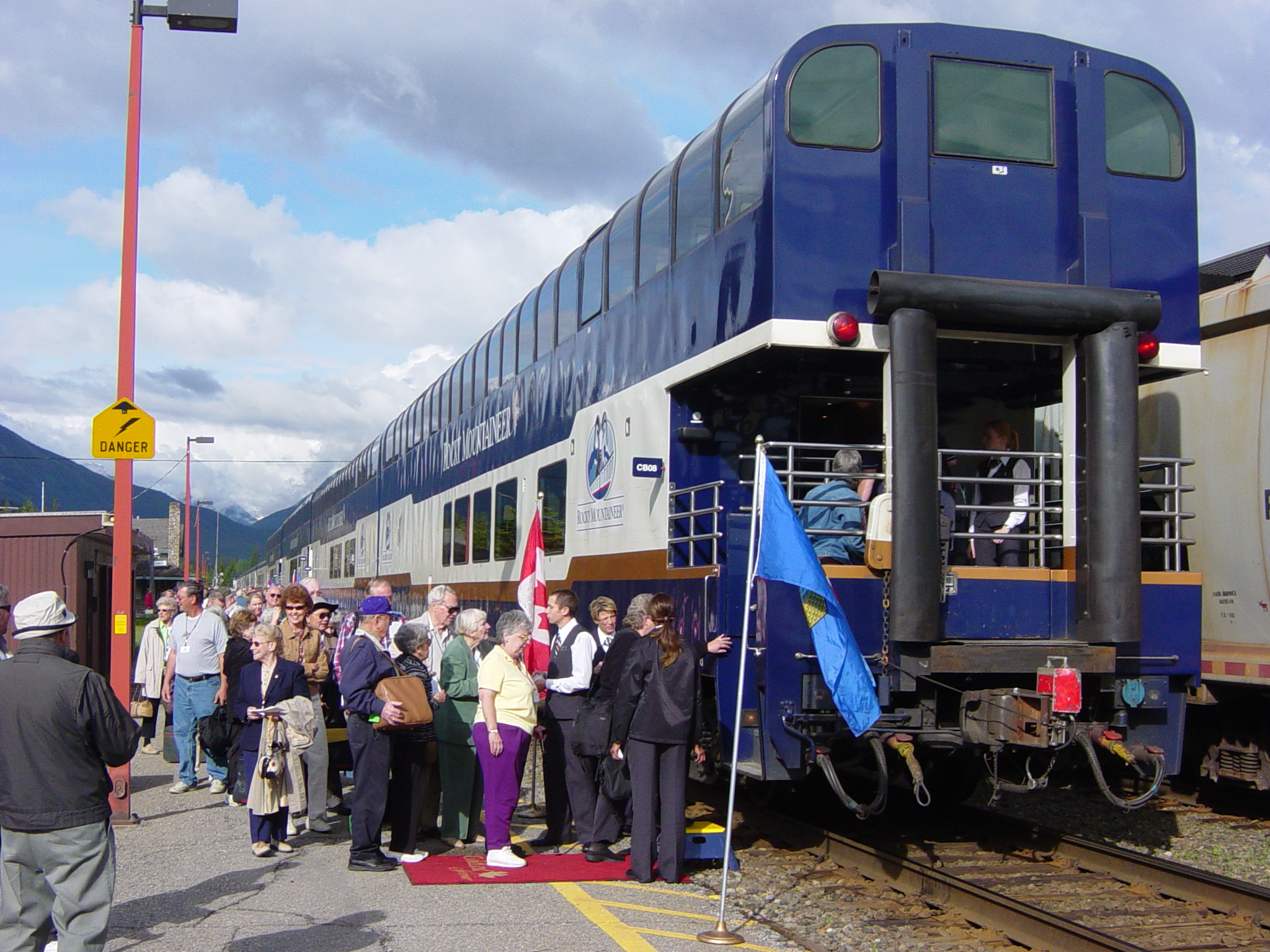
The Rocky Mountaineer boards passengers at Banff, Alberta, showing its former livery, 2006

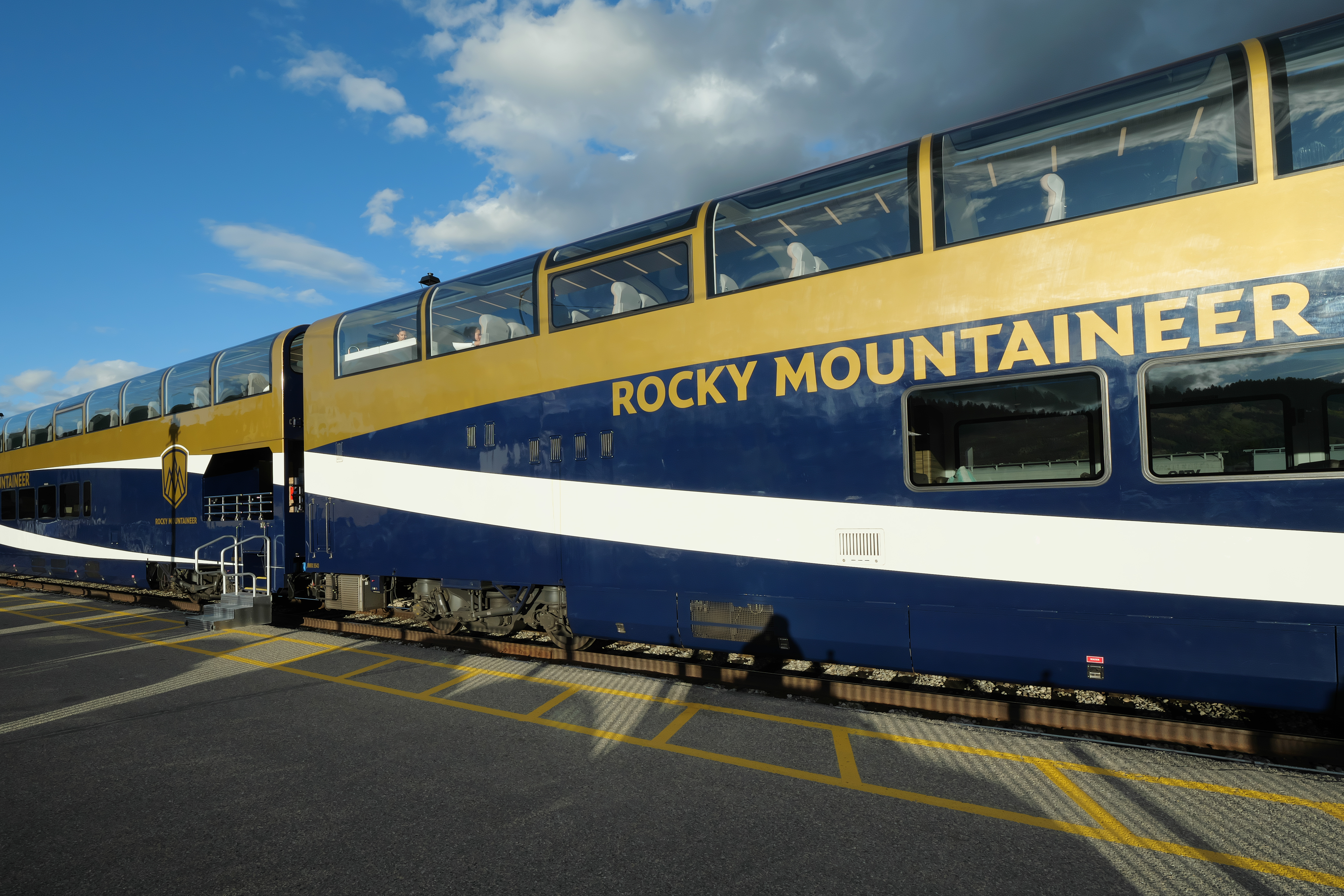
Two Goldleaf double-deck panorama wagons of the Rocky Mountaineer in the station at Jasper, 2019

The Rocky Mountaineer's fleet includes:

- GP40-2L locomotives (formerly Canadian National Railway)
- EMD SD40E locomotives (formerly Conrail/NS/NREX/HZRX SD50s)
- SD70M locomotives leased from Union Pacific (the original GP40-2L units are non-compliant with Positive Train Control )
- 18 "SilverLeaf" single-level dome coaches, rebuilt from RedLeaf coaches
- Canada Car and Foundry single-deck coaches, ex-Canadian National Railway
- 16 "GoldLeaf" Colorado Railcar bi-level Ultra Dome coaches, with wrap-over view windows on the top level
- 10 "GoldLeaf" Stadler bi-level glass domed coaches, with restaurant and kitchen in the lower level
- 12 crew cars
- 8 generator cars
- 9 locomotives
- Two lounge cars (for SilverLeaf Plus service)

Previous equipment included GE B36-7 locomotives leased from Santa Fe.

== Routes ==
Rocky Mountaineer currently operates train journeys on three routes, with two in western Canada and one in the southwestern United States. Three additional routes (two in Canada and one international) are no longer operated.

- First Passage to the West: This route operates between Vancouver and Banff, with an overnight stop in Kamloops and an intermediate stop in Lake Louise. It operates primarily on Canadian Pacific Kansas City (CPKC) trackage, although directional running through the Fraser Canyon means that westbound trains use Canadian National Railway tracks in that area.
- Journey Through the Clouds: This route operates between Vancouver and Jasper with an overnight stop in Kamloops. It operates primarily on Canadian National Railway trackage, although directional running through the Fraser Canyon means that eastbound trains use Canadian Pacific Kansas City (CPKC) tracks in that area.
- Rockies to the Red Rocks: This route operates between Denver and Salt Lake City, with overnight stops in Glenwood Springs and Moab. Running on Union Pacific Railroad trackage, it was announced in November 2020 and began service earlier than planned, on August 15, 2021. On April 21, 2026 the route was taken over by Canyon Spirit, under the same parent company, and extended from Moab, Utah to Salt Lake City. Canyon Spirit does sometimes use the name Rockies to the Red Rocks alongside its own name.

=== Former routes ===
- Rainforest to Gold Rush: This route operated between North Vancouver and Jasper, with overnight stops in Whistler and Quesnel. It operated on Canadian National Railway trackage, including ex-BC Rail tracks between North Vancouver and Prince George.
- Whistler Mountaineer/Whistler Sea to Sky Climb: This route was a day trip operating between North Vancouver and Whistler on Canadian National Railway trackage. It was discontinued after the 2015 season and incorporated into the overlapping Rainforest to Gold Rush route.
- Coastal Passage: This route was a day trip operating between Seattle, Vancouver, Jasper/Banff on BNSF Railway trackage, intended to provide travelers from the United States with easier access to the other Vancouver-based routes. It was discontinued after the 2019 season due to low demand.

== Service levels ==
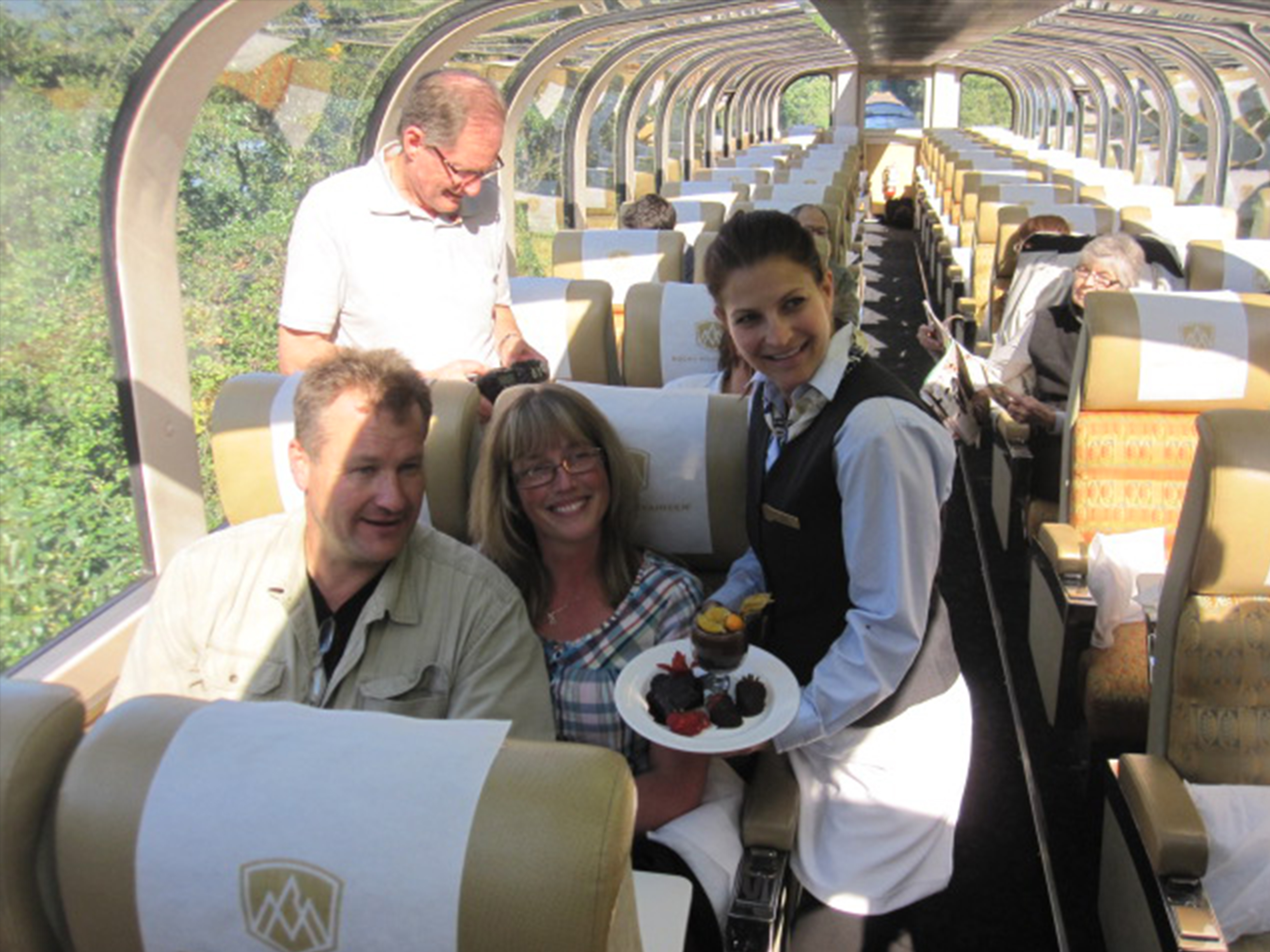
Upper level of Rocky Mountaineer GoldLeaf

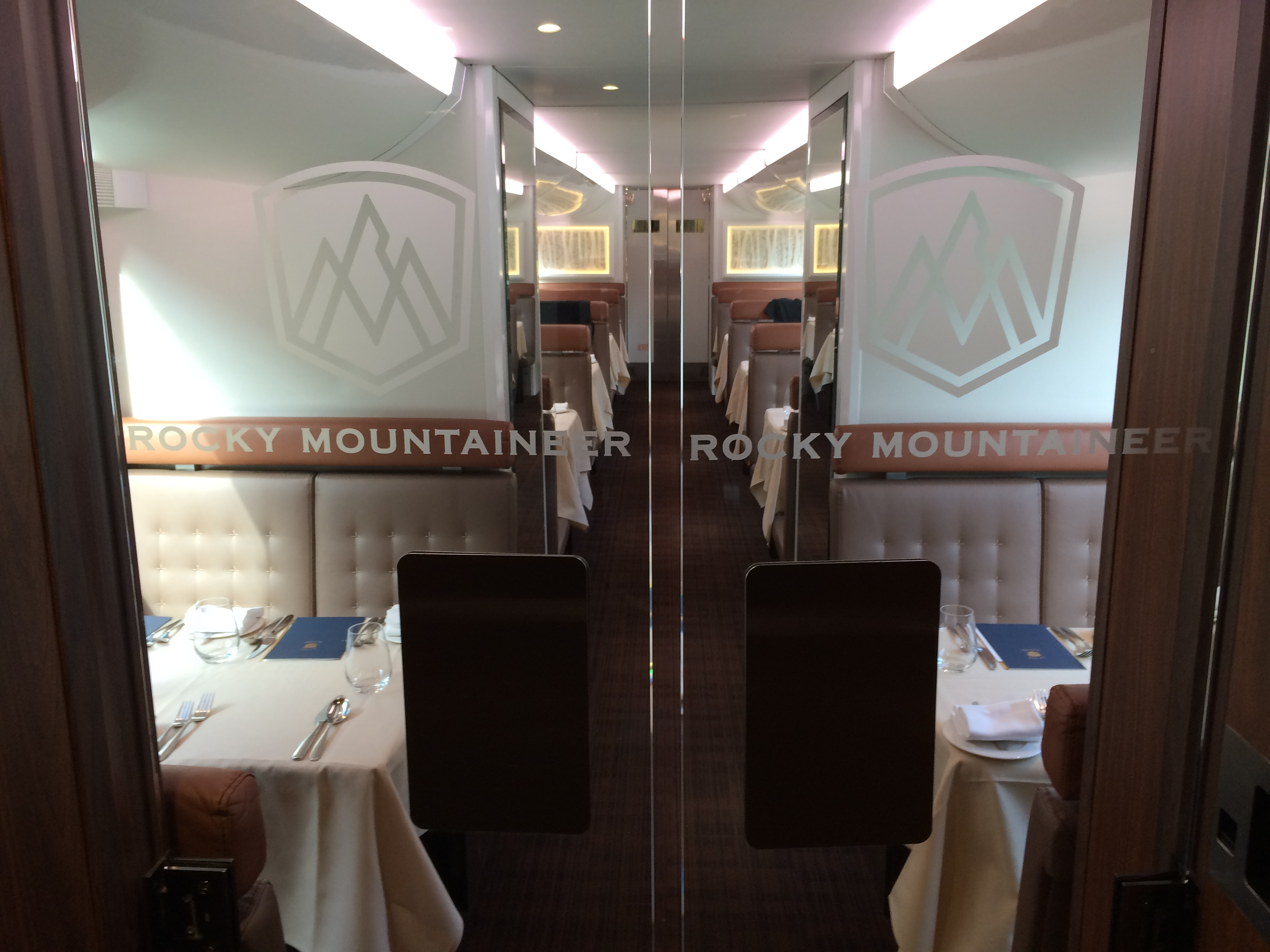
Lower dining level on GoldLeaf

=== GoldLeaf ===
Operating on all routes except the Rockies to the Red Rocks, Rocky Mountaineer's GoldLeaf service is a custom-designed, bi-level, glass-domed coach with full-length windows and reclining seats that can be rotated to accommodate groups of four. Guests are offered hot meals prepared on board the train, served to them in the lower level dining car.

GoldLeaf service is not offered on the Rockies to the Red Rocks route because the coaches exceed the loading gauge; this mainly has to do with the coaches being taller than the Amtrak Superliners and double-stack container trains that frequent the route.

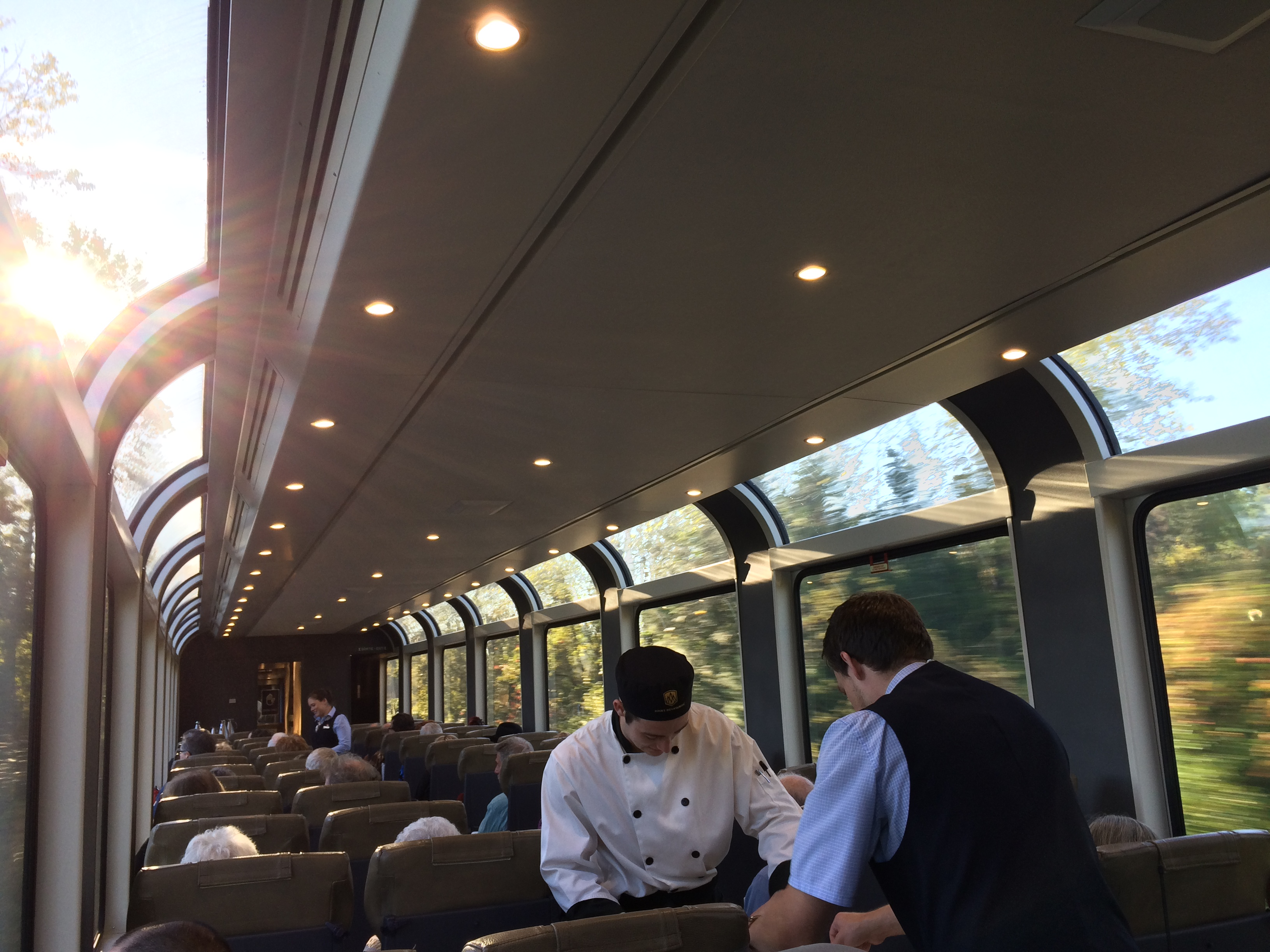
Rocky Mountaineer SilverLeaf

=== SilverLeaf ===
Operating on the same routes as GoldLeaf (and being the only service offered on the Rockies to the Red Rocks route), Rocky Mountaineer's SilverLeaf service is a custom-designed, single-level glass domed coach with oversized windows and reclining seats. Guests are offered breakfast and lunch served at their seat.

=== SilverLeaf Plus ===
This service option is only offered on Rocky Mountaineer's Rockies to the Red Rocks route (Denver to Moab). SilverLeaf Plus includes all the benefits of their SilverLeaf Service, plus exclusive access to their newly renovated lounge car. Featuring signature cocktails, the lounge car offers additional space indoors as well as a small outdoor viewing area. This service level offers an elevated dining experience and premium alcoholic beverages.

== Trip structure ==
Rocky Mountaineer trains operate only during the tourist season, from April to October. They operate exclusively during the day and sleeper services are not offered. All trips include overnight stops at which passengers disembark and stay in hotels.

As Rocky Mountaineer is primarily a rail-tour service, all journeys are end-to-end. Between their origin and destination, trains only stop for overnight layovers and no passengers may begin or end their journeys at these stations. The one exception to these provisions is First Passage to the West, which has an intermediate stop at Lake Louise where westbound passengers may board and eastbound passengers may disembark. No tickets are sold solely for the Banff–Lake Louise portion of the trip.

Rocky Mountaineer train journeys often include bus connections between stations and hotels. Packages may also include bus connections to nearby cities (such as from Banff to Calgary).

Each journey is designed as a leisurely experience, with commentary, locally inspired cuisine, and opportunities to observe wildlife such as bears, eagles, and mountain goats along the route. The company emphasizes a slow-travel philosophy, encouraging guests to focus on scenery and relaxation rather than speed.
