= CN Bala Subdivision =

Major railway service line in Ontario

Bala Subdivision

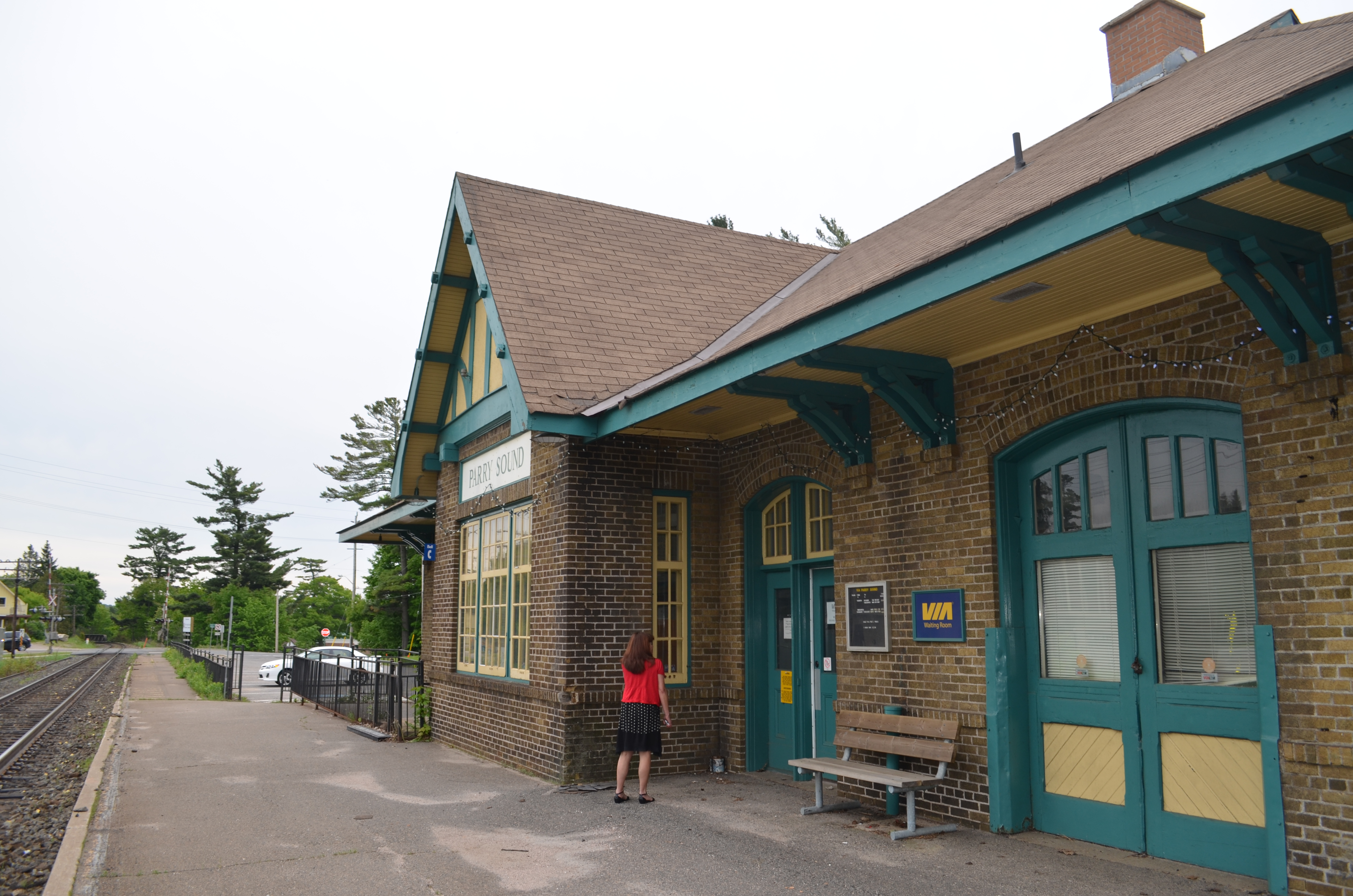
- Via Rail station in Parry Sound on the Bala Subdivision.

Overview
- Status: Operational
- Owner: Canadian National Railway; Metrolinx
- Locale: Ontario, Canada
- Termini: Toronto (Union Station Rail Corridor); Capreol
- Stations: Old Cummer; Langstaff; Richmond Hill; Gormley; Bloomington; Washago; Parry Sound (former CN); Sudbury Junction; Capreol

Service
- Type: Heavy rail
- System: Canadian National Railway
- Services: Richmond Hill; Canadian; Continental (former); Super Continental (former); Northlander (former)
- Operator(s): Canadian National Railway (freight); GO Transit (passenger); Via Rail (passenger)

History
- Opened: 1906 (Toronto to Parry Sound)

Technical
- Line length: 276.1 mi (444.3 km)
- Track gauge: 1,435 mm (4 ft 8 1/2 in) standard gauge

The Canadian National Railway (CN) Bala Subdivision is a major railway line in Ontario, Canada. It runs between the provincial capital of Toronto in Southern Ontario and Capreol in Northern Ontario, where the line continues as the Ruel Subdivision. It forms part of CN's transcontinental mainline between Southern Ontario and Western Canada.

Passing to the east of Lake Simcoe, the line bypasses the cities of Barrie and Orillia, instead passing through the community of Washago. Cutting west toward Georgian Bay, it parallels the Canadian Pacific Kansas City's MacTier Subdivision through Parry Sound country, penetrating into the more rugged terrain of the Canadian Shield.

== History ==
The history of the Bala Subdivision is focused around the Central Ontario port town of Parry Sound. In the late 19th century, there were a number of plans to connect the Parry Sound area to the Ottawa Valley (and from there, the Saint Lawrence River) to the east, Toronto in the south, and James Bay in the north. After a number of disparate efforts in the 1880s by forces such as the Canadian Northern Railway (CNoR), the former materialized as the Ottawa, Arnprior and Parry Sound Railway, which bypassed the town to reach a western terminus at Depot Harbour nearby, and connected to the Northern and Pacific Junction Railway which ran from Toronto to Nipissing Junction, where it connected to the Canadian Pacific Railway line. With the increasing attractiveness of Sudbury as a rail destination due to the mining boom in the Sudbury Basin, the Canadian Northern's James Bay Railway was rechartered as the Canadian Northern Ontario Railway and rerouted through Sudbury. Construction was hindered as the company attempted to penetrate through Toronto's crowded railway network to Union Station in the south, and a small railway battle occurred when the CNoR's construction crews attempted to build a level crossing with the Grand Trunk Railway tracks at Rosedale. The GTR, in preparation for this, had blocked their path with a freight car, which was destroyed by the CNoR crews with dynamite. Ultimately the two railway companies came to an agreement to terminate the CNoR line at a junction (Rosedale Junction) with the GTR-owned and largely-defunct Toronto Belt Line Railway, and for CNoR trains to use the Belt Line to reach Union Station. The Toronto–Parry Sound segment was completed in 1906, terminating in the south at Rosedale Junction, running northward to the east of Lake Simcoe before crossing over the former Northern Railway of Canada (NRC) line to North Bay, which would later become known as the CN Newmarket Subdivision. At the time, this new line was known as the Parry Sound Section of the Canadian Northern, but by 1914 it was being referred to as the Parry Sound Subdivision of the Toronto Division, and later the Muskoka Subdivision of the Nipissing Division.

During the First World War, many Canadian railways encountered severe financial problems. Historically reliant on generous federal loans to support the construction of new lines, one by one, the major railways became insolvent. In 1914, the Canadian Northern's financial problems began to threaten its main creditor, the Canadian Bank of Commerce, and the company appealed for federal aid. The Government of Canada created a new entity, the Canadian Government Railways (CGR), which was known under the slogan The People's Railway, to manage a number of smaller railways it had acquired around this time. In 1917, the federal government effectively took control of the Canadian Northern, and in 1918 the company's board resigned and was replaced with a government-appointed board. Late that year, an Order in Council instructed the CGR and CNoR to merge operations under a new name, the Canadian National Railway. By 1920, Canada's great eastern railway conglomerate, the Grand Trunk Railway, had become entirely bankrupt and was nationalized under the Canadian National Railway, though legal action from shareholders delayed this until 1923.

The integration of the Canadian Northern and Grand Trunk systems resulted in two parallel north–south mainlines in Central Ontario for the new Canadian National Railway: one passing to the west of Lake Simcoe through Newmarket, Barrie, and Orillia on its way to Nipissing Junction, and another passing to the east of Lake Simcoe on its way to Parry Sound; the two lines crossed each other at Washago. In 1923, with the reorganization of the lines, the latter became known as the Bala Subdivision. Around the same time, the Washago Connection was constructed, which replaced the level crossing of the two lines with two junctions and a short joint section.

By the late 1950s, the bulk of CN's regional passenger services for the two lines ran along the Newmarket Subdivision, while the Bala Subdivision was used for transcontinental services such as the Continental and Super Continental, with mostly express operations until Washago; at the time, the Super Continental had a scheduled travel time from Toronto to Parry Sound of 4 hours and 3 minutes. This would soon change, however, as CN's operations around Toronto were significantly reorganized in the 1960s. CN had made far-reaching plans to relocate much of its freight operations to the north end of Toronto, centred on a new freight yard the MacMillan Yard, and to abandon the century-old waterfront yard in the downtown Railway Lands, freeing that land up for redevelopment. This would be accomplished with a new east–west line, the CN York Subdivision, which would intersect with the Bala Subdivision just south of Richmond Hill at Doncaster Junction. Both were completed in 1965. Centralized traffic control (CTC) had been installed along the line from Don to Richmond Hill in the previous year. By 1966, passenger services were being entirely routed through the Newmarket Subdivision south of Washago, including the Super Continental, which had a scheduled travel time from Toronto to Parry Sound of 4 hours and 5 minutes.

A GO Transit Richmond Hill line was initially proposed in 1969, but the proposal was scrapped in 1970 in favour of a bus service. The Richmond Hill line would ultimately only begin service in 1978, almost a decade after it was proposed. Around this time, CN divested itself of its passenger services, which were handed over to a new Crown corporation, Via Rail, whose services continued to follow the Newmarket Subdivision rather than the Bala Subdivision south of Washago. Even with the resumption of passenger services along the southern part of the line with the GO Richmond Hill line, the line "suffered from neglect," and services and ridership were slow to grow.

From August to October 1996, a special "Casino Rama Express" train ran along the line to provide a direct rail connection between downtown Toronto and Casino Rama. The service operated daily, leaving northbound from Toronto in the morning after southbound commuter trains had been cleared from the line, and returning to Union Station in the evening or sometimes late at night. Paid for by the casino, it used GO Transit trainsets and was operated by CN crews. Despite its name, trains made stops at all GO Transit commuter stations along the line and continued on to Washago, where they doubled back southbound onto the Newmarket Subdivision before reaching a purpose-built station near the casino. Despite marketing efforts, the service was not heavily utilized, and its final run occurred on 2 October 1996.

The Bala Subdivision's operations changed significantly after 1996, when CN registered a series of applications to abandon sections of the Newmarket Subdivision. This forced the remaining through passenger services along the Newmarket Subdivision south of Washago to relocate to the Bala Subdivision, namely the Ontario Northland Railway's Northlander and the Via Rail Canadian, the latter of which subsequently adopted a route similar to the pre-1960s Super Continental, and initially had a scheduled travel time of 4 hours and 15 minutes to Parry Sound as a limited express with only one intermediate stop, at Washago.

In 2005, CN and CP negotiated the creation of a directional running zone utilizing both of their lines. Starting at mile 146 (Boyne) just south of Parry Sound, all northbound trains began using the CP Parry Sound Subdivision, while southbound trains, including Via passenger and CP freight trains, began using the Bala Subdivision exclusively. The long-closed CP passenger station was reactivated, creating an unusual situation where the unified Via passenger services used both of the historic CN and CP stations in a single community. As of 2019, the Via Rail Canadian continues to use the CP station for northbound trains and the CN station for southbound ones.

Starting in the early 2010s, Metrolinx, the provincial Crown agency which oversees GO Transit operations, began to invest more heavily in the line. A significant milestone in this was the inclusion of the segment of the line from Rosedale Valley Road north through the Don Valley to Doncaster Junction in a CA$310.5 million combined purchase of track from CN in 2012, which also included a portion of the Oakville Subdivision. In 2016, for the first time since the launch of GO train service along the line, regular GO Transit revenue service was extended north of Richmond Hill station to a new station at Gormley, complementing a new train depot which had been constructed in 2014. This was followed by plans for a Bloomington station, construction on which began in 2017.

== Operations ==
Operations along the line include a mix of CN freight along with Via Rail and GO passenger trains. Via Rail traffic normally consists of two Canadian trains northbound and southbound per week, while services on Go's Richmond Hill line consist of weekday southbound morning peak period trains with afternoon and early evening returns. All southbound passenger trains on the line terminate at Toronto Union Station. Activity along the line is governed using centralized traffic control (CTC) by a rail traffic controller (RTC) in Toronto.
