= Washago station =

Railway station in Ontario, Canada

Washago
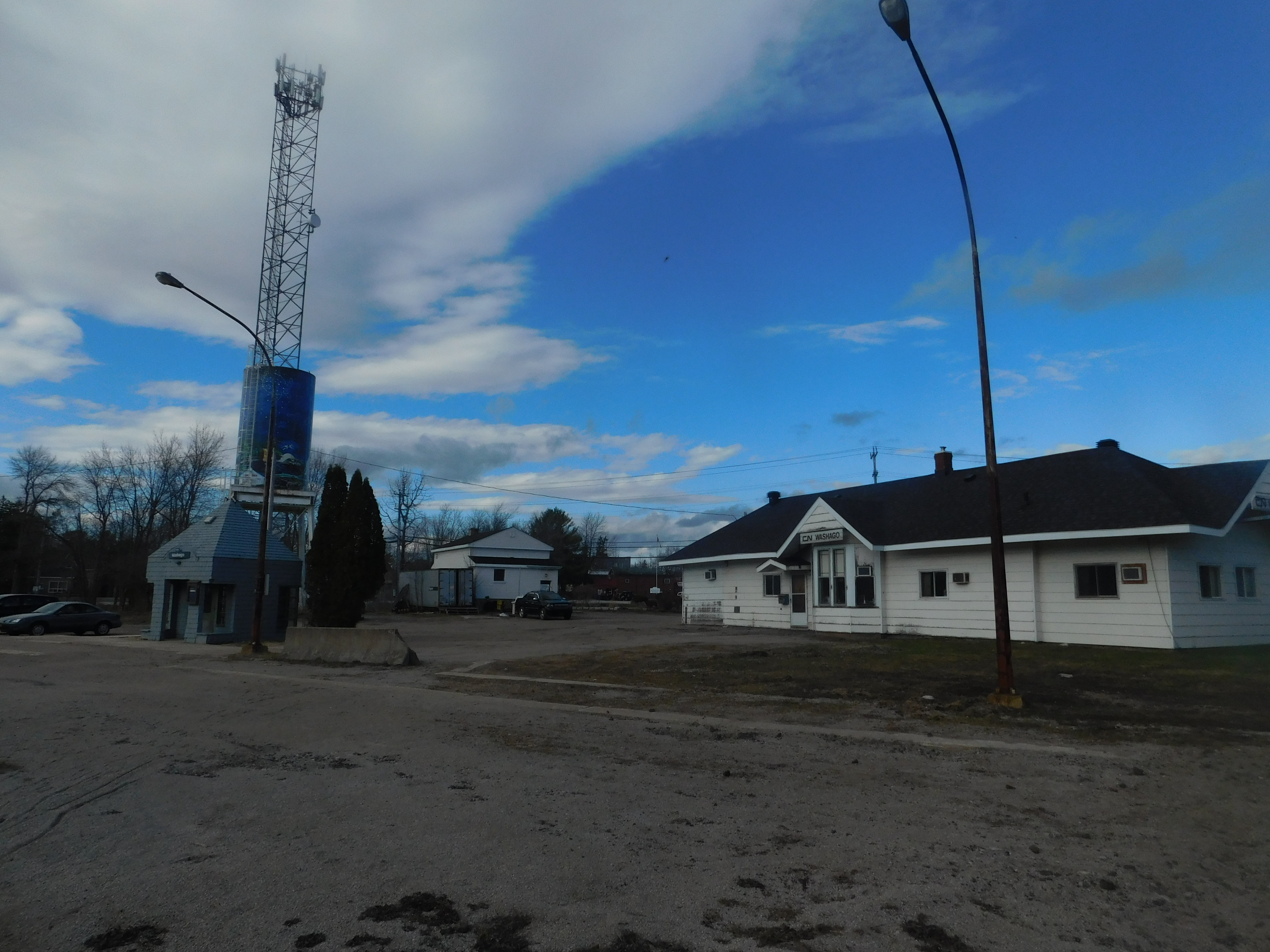
- Washago station in April 2019. The VIA Rail shelter is on the left and the former depot, used by CN is on the right.

General information
- Location: 3321 Quetton Street; Washago, Ontario; Canada
- Coordinates: 44°44′55.6″N 79°20′06″W
- Lines: CN Bala Subdivision; ONR Newmarket Subdivision
- Platforms: 1
- Tracks: 1

Construction
- Structure type: At-grade
- Parking: 4 spaces
- Cycle facilities: No
- Accessible: Yes

Other information
- Status: Unstaffed station
- Station code: Via Rail: WSHG

Services
Preceding station	Ontario Northland Railway	Following station
Gravenhurst toward Cochrane	Northlander (reopening Dec. 10, 2026)	Gormley toward Toronto
Preceding station	Via Rail	Following station
Parry Sound toward Vancouver	The Canadian	Toronto Terminus
Former services
Preceding station	Ontario Northland Railway	Following station
Gravenhurst toward Cochrane	Northlander 1977–2012	Toronto Terminus
Preceding station	Via Rail	Following station
Parry Sound toward Vancouver	The Canadian before 1990	Orillia toward Toronto
Preceding station	Canadian National Railway	Following station
Sparrow Lake toward Capreol	Capreol – Toronto	Rathburn toward Toronto
Severn toward North Bay	North Bay – Toronto	Floral Park toward Toronto
Location
- Location within Southern Ontario Location within Ontario Location within Canada

Washago station is a passenger railway station in the community of Washago, Ontario, Canada, part of the Township of Severn in northeastern Simcoe County. The station is located immediately south of Simcoe County Road 169, east of Highway 11.

It is the first station stop after Toronto Union Station for Via Rail's transcontinental Canadian route. Washago was also the first stop northwest of Union Station for the Ontario Northland Railway's Northlander, until that train service was discontinued in 2012.

In 2021 the Government of Ontario announced plans to restore service using ONR from this station. Service on the Northlander is expected to resume on December 10, 2026.

The new station will be one of nine enclosed shelters to provide a waiting area of passengers.

== Services ==
The station is unstaffed with all ticketing and baggage handling services provided by VIA Rail onboard train staff. Track is maintained by Canadian National Railway.

== Station buildings ==
The station building was built by the Canadian Northern Railway in 1906, at a location 200 meters west of its present site and moved in 1922 to replace the Grand Trunk station that had been destroyed about 1913. The GTR station was north of the present station location, behind the Washago Hotel. The relocated Canadian Northern station was turned so its original canopy end was at the south end of the building and the bay window faced to the Grand Trunk side, but an additional bay window was added on the west side. The original station location was on Centennial Park Drive. The Canadian Northern originally crossed the GTR line with a diamond and interlocking tower, which was removed in 1920–21 when Canadian National Railway assumed operations of Grand Trunk Railway.

A former CNR steam locomotive-era water tower at the station has been decorated and is used for the hamlet's water supply. The station itself consists of a transit shelter and platform with a small waiting room (grey structure) located by the tracks. The white station building is now closed to passengers because it is used by CN for maintenance staff and equipment. Parking is limited and rest of the station area is used to store CN maintenance vehicles.

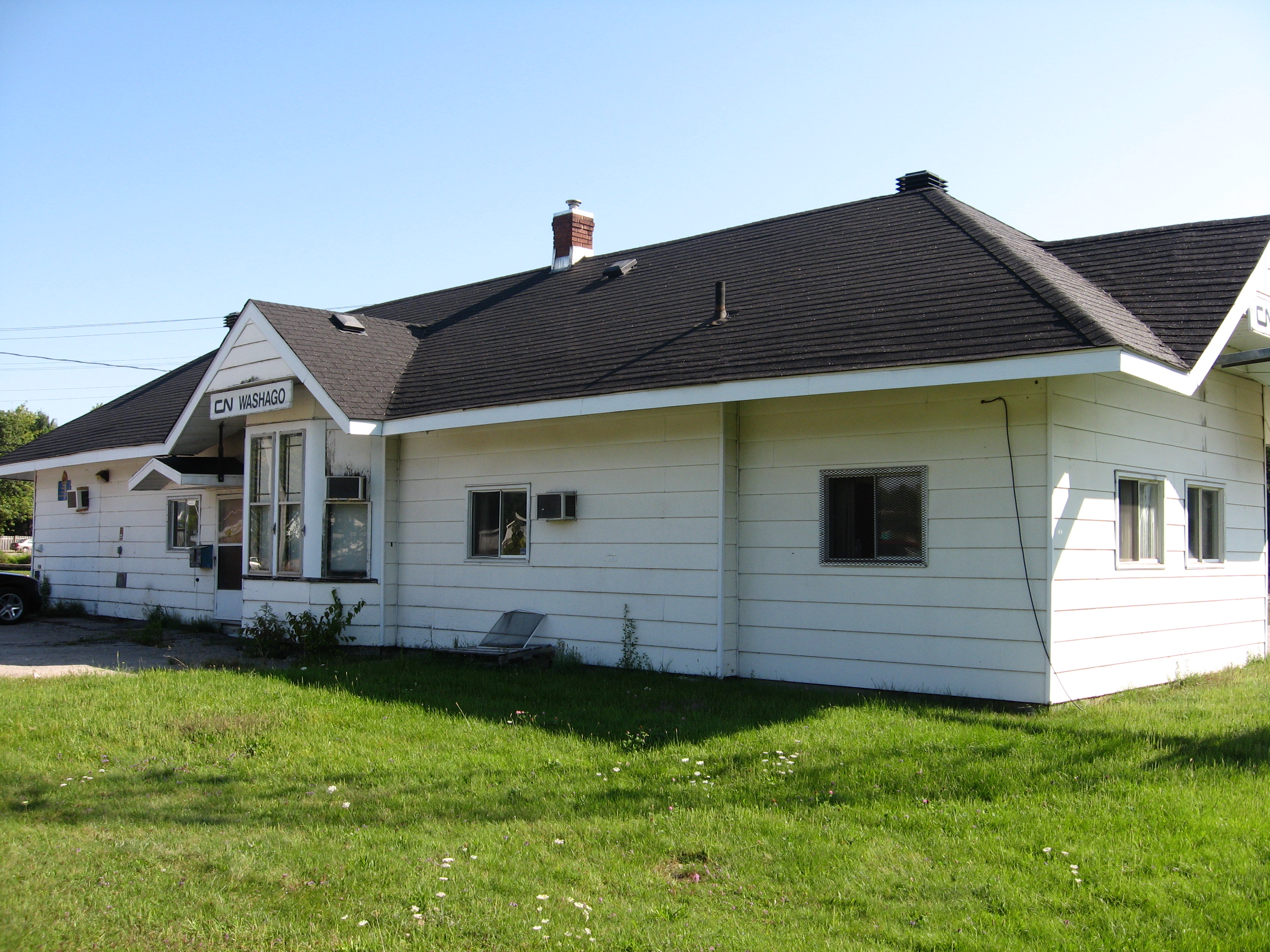
The station in 2009
