= South River station =

Railway station in Ontario, Canada

South River

General information
- Coordinates: 45°50′30″N 79°22′32″W
- Owner: Village of South River
- Line: Newmarket Subdivision

Construction
- Parking: 5 spaces
- Accessible: Yes

Other information
- Website: South River Train Station

History
- Opened: 1884
- Closed: 2012
- Rebuilt: 2026

Services
Preceding station	Ontario Northland Railway	Following station
North Bay toward Cochrane	Northlander (reopening Dec. 10, 2026)	Huntsville toward Toronto
Location

South River station is located in the community of South River in Ontario as a railway station. The station was originally constructed by the Northern and Pacific Junction Railway, a subsidiary of the Northern and Northwestern Railway, in 1884. It was subsequently owned and operated by the Grand Trunk Railway (1888 - 1919) and Canadian National Railways (1919 - 1986). It was a significant station stop along the historic route connecting Toronto to North Bay, and the Canadian Pacific Railway (1885). Transcontinental trains traveling between Toronto and Vancouver once frequented the station. It is likely the oldest wooden railway station in north-eastern Ontario. It is now a community heritage building in the town of South River. It is scheduled to reopen on December 10, 2026.

== History ==
The Northern Railway of Canada had reached Gravenhurst by 1875, which was its northernmost terminal at the time. (The section between Barrie and Gravenhurst was initially built by the Toronto, Simcoe and Muskoka Junction Railway, circa 1870, before being acquired by the Northern Railway in 1875.) The Northern and Northwestern railway network consisted of the former Northern Railway of Canada, and Hamilton and Northwestern Railway, which merged in 1879.

Due to the construction of the Canadian Pacific Railway through the Mattawa valley, and along the north shore of Lake Nipissing beginning in the summer of 1881, the Toronto-based Northern and Northwestern wished to provide a direct connection to the new C.P.R. transcontinental line that would ensure Toronto's economic involvement. A new company was formed, the "Northern and Pacific Junction Railway" which was then leased to and operated by the parent Northern and Northwestern Railway, circa 1883. The new line was to extend the existing railhead at Gravenhurst to the C.P.R. mainline at the La Vase River, just east of Lake Nipissing. This location was subsequently named Nipissing Junction. The line was referred to as "The Callander Extension" at the time, as the village of Callander was the closest existing establishment to the junction point. Construction began in 1884 and was finished in 1886. Regular-schedule, revenue service commenced in the spring of 1887.

One year later in 1888, the Grand Trunk Railway bought out the Northern and Northwestern Railway, including the Northern and Pacific Junction Railway. From that time on, until the insolvency of the G.T.R. circa 1918-1919 the line was owned and operated by the Grand Trunk Railway. From that time until the present day, the line has been owned and operated by Canadian National Railways.

The South River Station is one of the first generation, original wooden stations built by the Northern and Pacific Junction Railway. It is also the last surviving station originally built along the line, all of the others having been demolished or replaced. This ranks it among the oldest railway stations in northern Ontario, and likely the oldest wooden station still existing in the region.

The South River station was built on the east side of the mainline and situated between Ottawa Avenue and Montreal Avenue. It featured a hip roof over the operators bay, and two gable dormers over the freight/express section. It was later moved by the Grand Trunk to the west side of the mainline, opposite to its original location, likely around 1907-1908 (Requires confirmation.) At this time, a new operators bay was constructed and finished with a new gable roof to face the mainline. The freight/express section was also altered with the addition of one shed-roof dormer, which was also added to face the mainline.

The station featured a combination of painted wood siding finishes: tongue and groove infill along the base course, doors, and soffit; and board and batten in the mid and upper courses. The original roof was cedar shingle. Heating was provided by pot-belly stoves using wood and/or coal. Initial interior and exterior platform lighting was provided by kerosene lanterns. While the original Northern and Pacific Junction Railway paint scheme is unknown, the standard Grand Trunk Railway paint scheme of hunter green, burgundy and yellow cream was used thereafter. Sometime in the post-war era (after 1945) a gray asphalt siding product (Insulbrick) was applied by Canadian National Railways over the wall sections. Asphalt roll and shingles later replaced the initial use of cedar shingles.

Consistent with the treatment of their historic railway stations, Canadian National Railways made numerous unsympathetic alterations to the building over the years, diminishing its original architectural elements and finishes. General neglect and lack of investment in these types of stations rendered most of them beyond repair, in which case they were demolished or left to decay.

The community of South River, however, established a restoration group which has overseen a concerted effort to save and re-establish the original paint scheme and wood finishes of the structure. Restoration work on the station was undertaken in the early to mid 2000s, with the hope to rehabilitate the building and re-use it for a new community purpose. Uses involving a heritage center and the local library were suggested.

The new station will be one of nine enclosed shelters to provide a waiting area for passengers.

== Passenger service ==
In 1887, revenue passenger and freight services commenced under the Northern and Pacific Junction Railway Division of the Northern and Northwestern Railway, based in Toronto. Passenger coaches were noted as being of the same standard as the C.P.R. to ensure interoperability with the C.P.R. at North Bay. These operations were short-lived under the Northern and Pacific Junction name however, as one year later the Grand Trunk Railway acquired all operations of the Northern and Northwestern Railway.

From 1888 until roughly 1919, passenger and freight traffic between North Bay and Toronto was provided primarily by the Grand Trunk Railway.

The Canadian Pacific Railway is recorded as having operated passenger and freight services along the line, under running-rights agreements with the Grand Trunk Railway, until the C.P.R. built their own line from Toronto to Sudbury in 1906–1908.

During the First World War era, The National Transcontinental Railway & Grand Trunk Pacific Railway also used the route to connect Toronto directly to their transcontinental mainline at Cochrane, Ontario, via the Temiskaming and Northern Ontario Railway.

Special joint services between the Temiskaming and Northern Ontario Railway, and the Grand Trunk Railway provided passenger services to points north of North Bay. Trains such as the 'Cobalt Express' provided service between Toronto and the world-famous silver mining community of Cobalt, Ontario circa 1906 onwards. The Grand Trunk also produced travel brochures promoting the Lake Nipissing and Lake Temagami areas to sportsmen and tourists.

The Temiskaming and Northern Ontario Railway was renamed the "Ontario Northland Railway" in 1946. It featured a regular passenger train service between Cochrane and Toronto called "The Northland." The Northland became a night-train service when "The Northlander" day-time passenger service was introduced in the late 1970s.

It was a station stop for Northlander trains of Ontario Northland before service was discontinued in 2012.

The station building built in 1884, closed by CN Rail in 1986 and now being renovated as a community heritage centre.
