= Huntsville station =

Railway station in Ontario, Canada

Huntsville
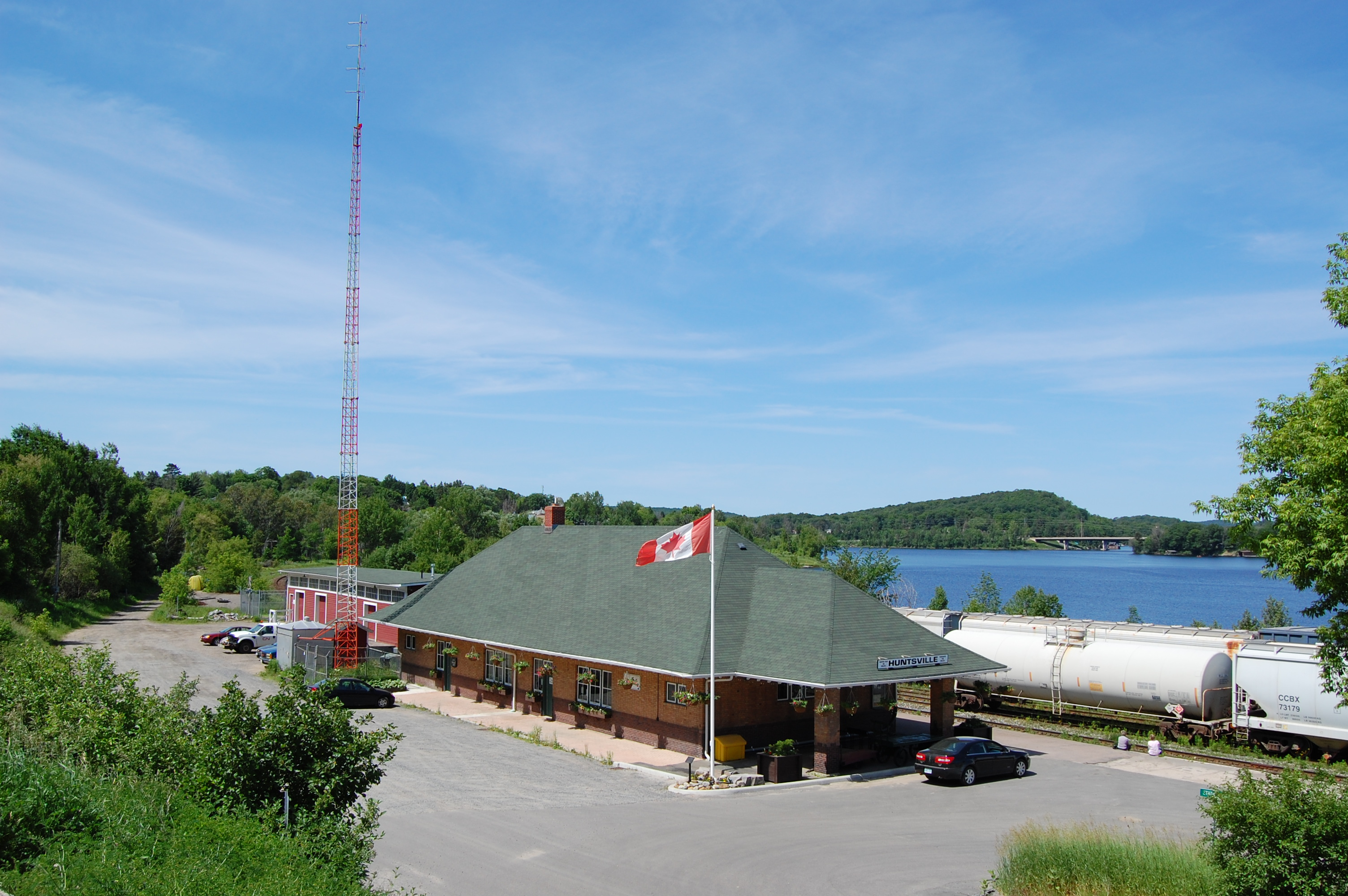
- Huntsville station, June 19, 2011

General information
- Location: 26 Burrow Pit Lane; Huntsville, Ontario; Canada
- Coordinates: 45°19′25″N 79°13′35″W
- Owner: Ontario Northland Railway
- Line: Newmarket Subdivision

Construction
- Parking: 8 spaces
- Cycle facilities: Yes
- Accessible: Yes

History
- Opened: 1924
- Closed: 2012
- Rebuilt: 2026

Services
Preceding station	Ontario Northland Railway	Following station
South River toward Cochrane	Northlander (reopening Dec. 10, 2026)	Bracebridge toward Toronto

Ontario Heritage Act
- Official name: Huntsville Canadian National Railway (CNR) Station
- Designated: 1988

Heritage Railway Station (Canada)
- Designated: 1993
Location

Huntsville station is a railway station located in the town of Huntsville, Ontario.

It was a station stop for Northlander trains of Ontario Northland. However the station is no longer in use since the cessation of the Northlander passenger service in 2012.

In 2021 the Government of Ontario announced plans to restore service using ONR from this station north to either Timminis or Cochrane by the mid 2020s.

Ontario Northland services the community with motorcoach, however they do not use the original train station for passengers. The Huntsville Yard and freight shed next to the station is still in use by CN Rail.

Huntsville is in the heart of Muskoka, which form part of Ontario’s “cottage country".

== History ==
The first station building (a board and batten structure) was built in 1885 by the Northern and Pacific Junction Railway, which later became part of the Grand Trunk Railway.

The present brick structure was erected in 1924 by the Canadian National Railway. The station has been protected under Part IV of the Ontario Heritage Act since 1988. It has also been designated as a Heritage Railway Station by the Government of Canada since 1993.

In 2017 the town of Huntsville sold the building to a trio of local businessmen for $2. The trio hoped to open "a community initiative centre" in it. Some town residents were upset that the building was sold, as the town had invested over $150,000 to upgrade the storm and sanitary sewers at the station. "Unresolved problems [at the station] include needing to remediate mould and asbestos at an estimated cost of $120,000 and repairing the HVAC system for $30,000."

A Huntsville restaurant, Smokin’ Hot BBQ, relocated to the railway station in 2024.

The new Northlander station will be one of nine enclosed shelters to provide a waiting area of passengers.

Service on the Northlander is expected to resume on December 10, 2026.
