= Gravenhurst station =

Railway station in Ontario, Canada

Gravenhurst
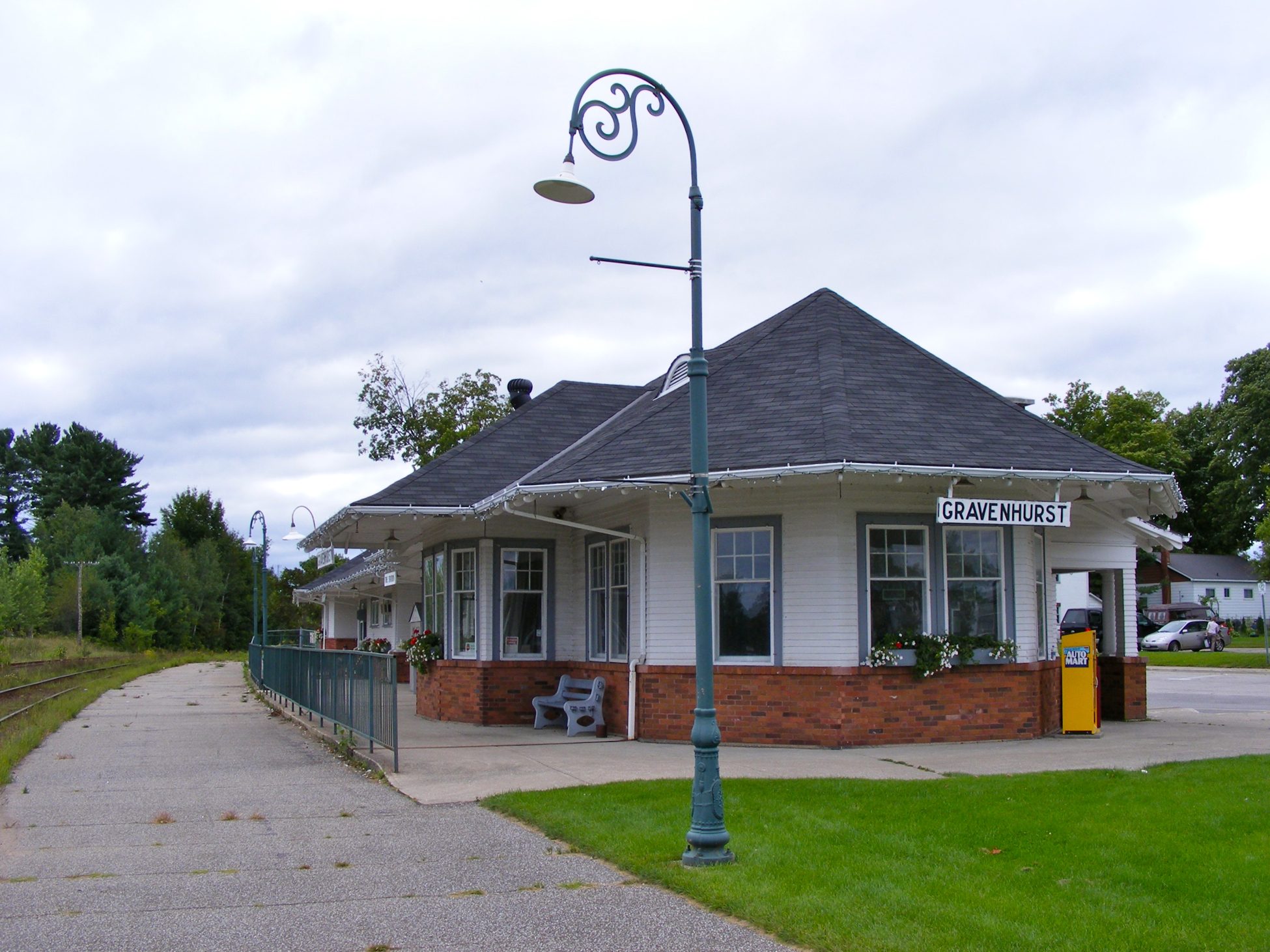

General information
- Location: 150 Second Avenue; Gravenhurst, Ontario; Canada
- Coordinates: 44°55′12″N 79°22′15″W
- Owner: Town of Gravenhurst
- Line: Newmarket Subdivision

Construction
- Structure type: At-grade
- Parking: 6 spaces
- Accessible: Yes

History
- Closed: 2012
- Rebuilt: 2026

Services
Preceding station	Ontario Northland Railway	Following station
Bracebridge toward Cochrane	Northlander (reopening Dec. 10, 2026)	Washago toward Toronto
Location

Gravenhurst station is a railway station located in the town of Gravenhurst, Ontario, Canada. It was a stop for Northlander trains of the Ontario Northland Railway before that service was discontinued in 2012.

The Government of Ontario announced plans in 2021 to restore service using ONR from this station north to either Timmins or Cochrane by the mid-2020s. Since the original station building has been repurposed for other uses, a new heated passenger shelter will be constructed on the site between 2024–2026 in preparation for ONR resuming Northlander passenger service on December 10, 2026.

The Muskoka Rails Museum is now housed in the original station building. The south building has a coffee shop and veterinary services.
