= Bracebridge station =

Former railway station in Ontario, Canada

Bracebridge

General information
- Location: 88 Hiram Street; Bracebridge, Ontario; Canada
- Coordinates: 45°02′39.73″N 79°18′39.23″W
- Owner: Ontario Northland Railway
- Line: Newmarket Subdivision

Construction
- Structure type: At-grade
- Parking: 5 spaces
- Cycle facilities: No
- Accessible: Yes

History
- Opened: 2004
- Closed: 2012
- Rebuilt: 2026

Services
Preceding station	Ontario Northland Railway	Following station
Huntsville toward Cochrane	Northlander (reopening Dec. 10, 2026)	Gravenhurst toward Toronto
Location

Bracebridge station is a railway station located in Bracebridge, Ontario, Canada. The station was a stop for Ontario Northland Railway's Northlander passenger trains until Northlander service was discontinued on September 28, 2012. Ontario Northland Motor Coach Services maintains a stop at the nearby Quality Inn for inter-city busses.

The current passenger shelter was constructed in 2004 by the Town of Bracebridge using donations and community volunteers. It remained in use until 2012. By 2015 only the small waiting station and parking lot remained. A former CNR speeder maintenance car on static display by Muskoka Rails Museum has been removed and is now located in Gravenhurst.

In 2021, the government of Ontario announced plans to restore the Northlander service, including a stop in Bracebridge, between Toronto and either Timmins or Cochrane by the mid 2020s. A new permanent heated passenger shelter will be constructed on the site between 2024–2026 in preparation for ONR resuming Northlander passenger service in the mid-2020s. The existing structure will be removed prior to constructing the new passenger shelter.

Service on the Northlander is expected to resume on December 10, 2026.
