= Eric Wilson (author) =

Canadian author of young adult fiction (born 1940)

- Born: November 24, 1940 (age 85); Ottawa, Ontario
- Education: University of British Columbia
- Occupations: Author and teacher
- Writing career
- Language: English
- Genres: young adult fiction, detective fiction

Eric Hamilton Wilson (born November 24, 1940) is a Canadian author of young adult fiction. His detective novels follow the adventures of Tom and Liz Austen, young sleuths in Canada. Wilson has taught elementary and secondary school in White Rock, British Columbia, and has a B.A. from the University of British Columbia.

In 1990, he won the Arthur Ellis Award for Lifetime Achievement from The Crime Writers of Canada.

== The Tom and Liz Austen mysteries ==
Originally a public school teacher, Wilson's teaching experiences pushed him into writing. Frustrated by some of his slow learners rejecting books as being too boring, Wilson decided to try writing stories himself. His first short stories were popular with his students, but publishers rejected his first five manuscripts.

Wilson developed a formula based on his eighth-grade students' preferences. His books would be short, should always start with a dramatic opening scene, be dialogue heavy, and have abundant "cliffhanger" moments. Wilson's books have similarities to the Hardy Boys adventure series, but also attempt the reader participation of "true" mysteries, such as those by Agatha Christie.

Wilson prominently features Canadian settings and their history in his novels. He also uses topical themes, such as environmentalism, child safety, and drug abuse, to allow teachers a springboard for classroom discussion. Criticism of Wilson's writing includes his use of improbable plotlines and somewhat stilted dialogue.

The Tom and Liz Austen books have won several Canadian book world recognitions, including the Crime Writers of Canada Chairman's Award, and the Canadian Booksellers Association's Author of the Year Award in 1993. Wilson currently lives in Victoria, British Columbia.

== Bibliography ==
=== Tom & Liz Austen Mysteries ===
1. Murder on 'The Canadian' - 1976
2. Vancouver Nightmare - 1978
3. Terror in Winnipeg - 1979
4. The Ghost of Lunenburg Manor - 1981
5. The Lost Treasure of Casa Loma - 1982
6. Disneyland Hostage - 1982
7. The Kootenay Kidnapper - 1983
8. Vampires of Ottawa - 1984
9. Spirit in the Rainforest - 1985
10. The Green Gables Detective - 1987
11. Code Red At the Supermall - 1988
12. Cold Midnight in Vieux Québec - 1989
13. The Ice Diamond Quest - 1990
14. The Prairie Dog Conspiracy - 1993
15. The St. Andrews Werewolf - 1993
16. The Case of the Golden Boy - 1994
17. The Inuk Mountie Adventure - 1996
18. Escape from Big Muddy - 1997
19. The Emily Carr Mystery - 2001
20. Red River Ransom - 2006

=== Other novels ===
- Summer of Discovery (1984)
- The Mask of the Raven aka The Unmasking of Ksan (1986)
