= Manor series =

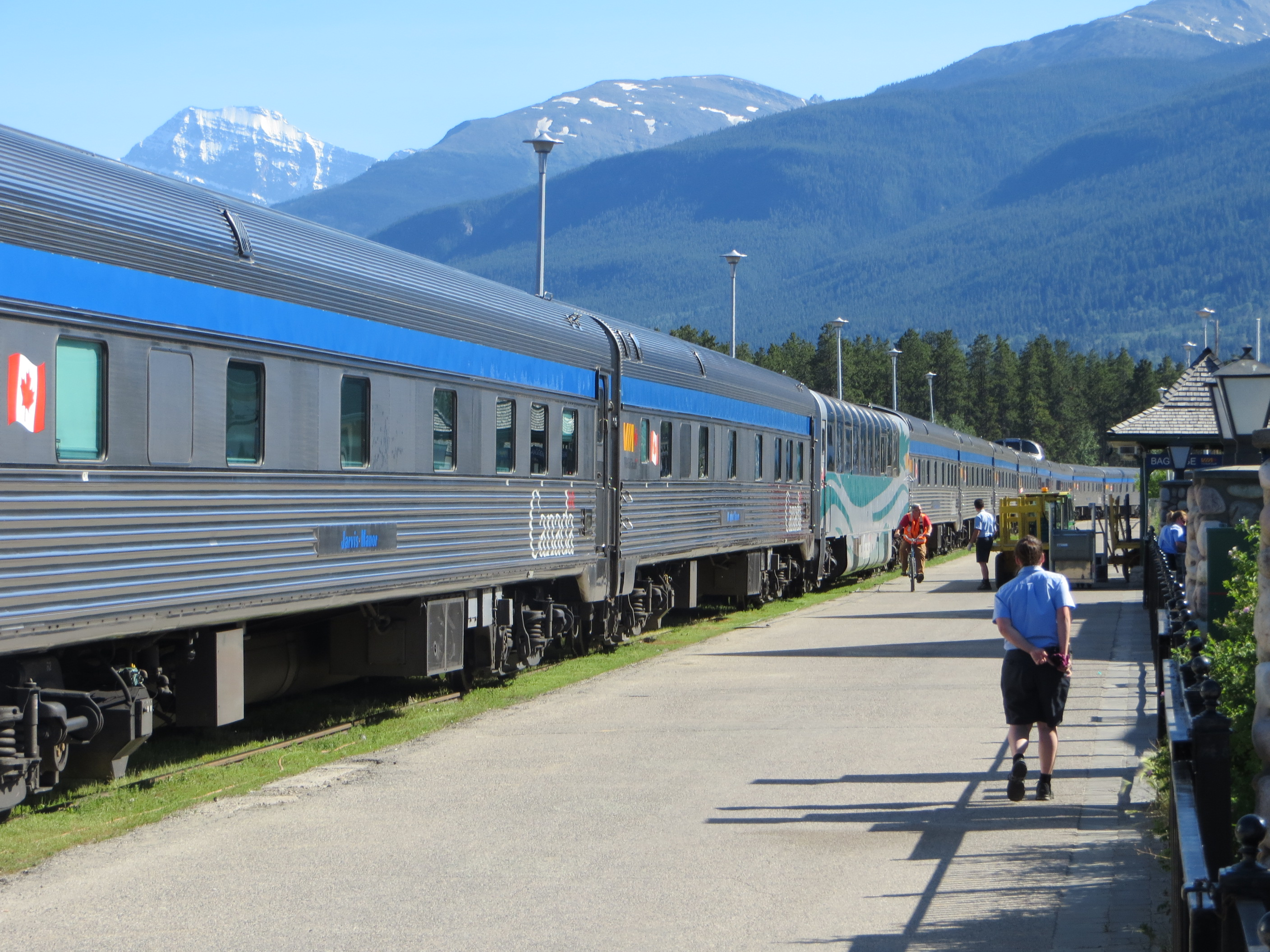
- Two Manor series cars on the Canadian at Jasper in 2013
- In service: 1954–present
- Manufacturer: Budd
- Constructed: 1954–55
- Number built: 42
- Number in service: 40
- Capacity: 6 double bedrooms; 3 sections; 4 roomettes
- Operators: Canadian Pacific (1954–1978); Via Rail (1978–present)

Specifications
- Car body construction: Stainless steel
- Car length: 85 feet (26 m)
- Width: 10 feet 3/8 inch (3.058 m)
- Height: 13 feet 6 3/4 inches (4.134 m)
- Weight: 134,100 pounds (60,800 kg)

The Manor series is a fleet of 42 lightweight streamlined sleeping cars built by the Budd Company for the Canadian Pacific Railway in 1954–1955. Each contained five bedrooms, one compartment, four sections and four roomettes. The cars were named for distinguished English Canadians. Via Rail acquired the fleet from the Canadian Pacific in 1978 and the cars remain in active service.

== Design ==
The cars were constructed of stainless steel; save for a Tuscan red letterboard bearing the name "Canadian Pacific" they were unpainted. Each car was named for a distinguished English Canadian but did not carry numbers. As built each contained five bedrooms, one compartment, four sections and four roomettes for a maximum capacity of 24 passengers. The four open sections were located at the front of the car, followed by the five bedrooms and one compartment, and then the four roomettes. Each of the rooms contained a private toilet.

Under Via Rail the cars were rebuilt to include a communal shower at the cost of one section. Via sells the compartment and the five bedrooms as "double bedrooms."

== Operation ==
Budd delivered 42 Manor cars for the Canadian Pacific in 1954–55 as part of a massive 173-car order which equipped the new transcontinental Canadian and re-equipped the Dominion. Via Rail acquired the entire fleet from Canadian Pacific in 1978. One, Aylmer Manor, caught fire on January 18, 1987, and was used as a testbed for Via's HEP conversion programme. Another, Dufferin Manor, was wrecked in the September 3, 1997, derailment near Biggar, Saskatchewan. As of 2015 the remaining 40 are on the roster and assigned to the Canadian.

== See also ==
- Manor Series fleet list
- Manor car floor plan
