= Parry Sound station =

Railway station in Ontario, Canada

Parry Sound
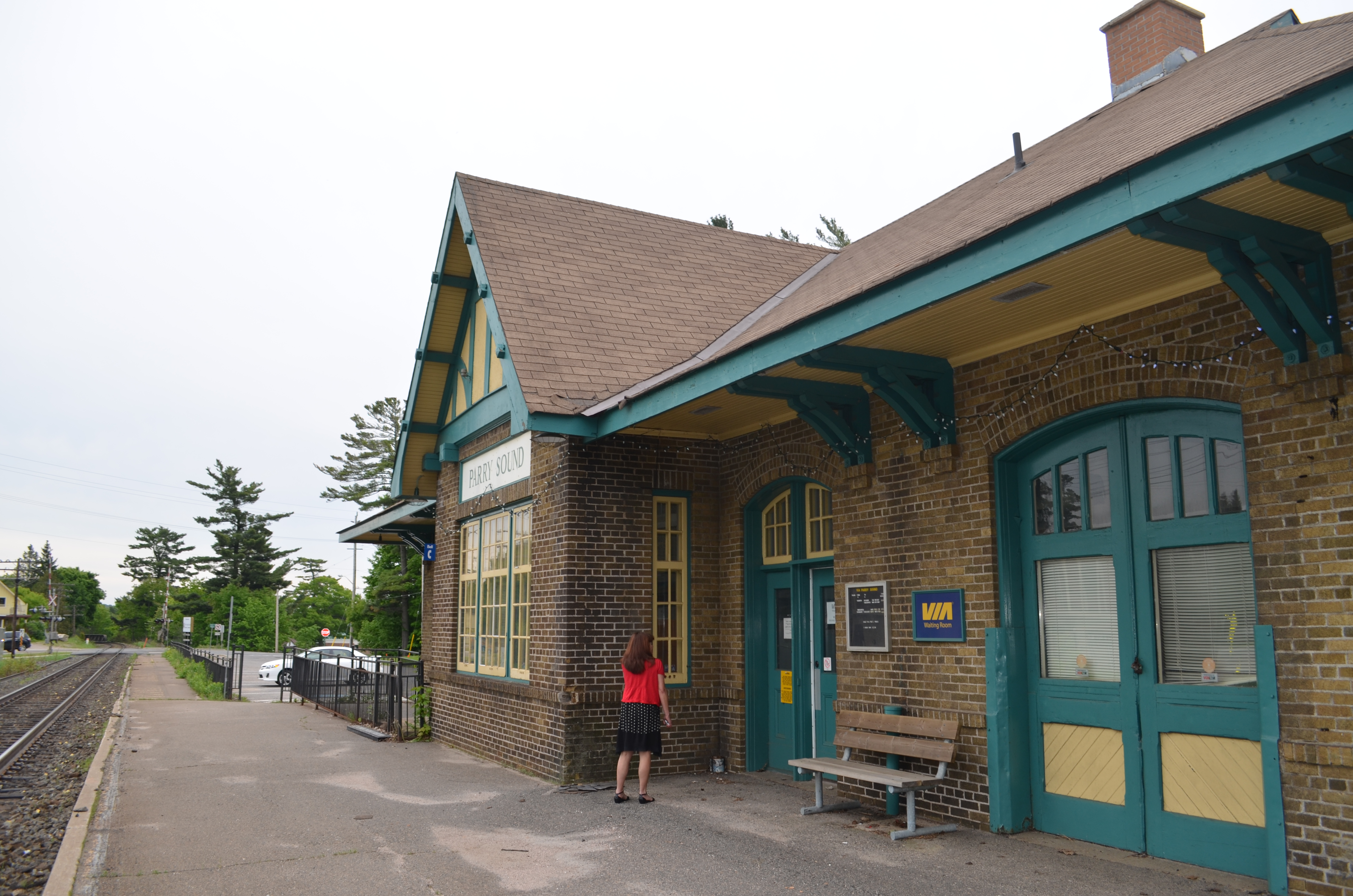
- CN (northbound) Parry Sound station

General information
- Location: 70 Church Street (CN); 1 Avenue Road (CP); Parry Sound, ON
- Coordinates: 45°21′02″N 80°02′14″W (CN); 45°20′45″N 80°02′16″W (CP)
- Owner: Engel & Völkers Parry Sound

Other information
- Status: Shelter (CN); Sign post (CP)

History
- Opened: 1932; 94 years ago (CN)

Services
Preceding station	Via Rail	Following station
Sudbury Junction toward Vancouver	The Canadian	Washago toward Toronto
Former services at "north" station
Preceding station	Via Rail	Following station
Bolger toward Vancouver	Super Continental	Washago toward Toronto
Preceding station	Canadian National Railway	Following station
Waubamic toward Capreol	Capreol – Toronto	South Parry toward Toronto
Terminus	Parry Sound – Algonquin Park	South Parry toward Algonquin Park
Former services at "south" station
Preceding station	Via Rail	Following station
Rutter toward Vancouver	The Canadian before 1990	Washago toward Toronto
Preceding station	Canadian Pacific Railway	Following station
Nobel toward Sudbury	Sudbury – Toronto	Deekmure toward Toronto
Location

The community of Parry Sound, Ontario, Canada has two railway stations, both of which are currently in use by Via Rail.

In December 2005, CN and CP implemented a plan to reduce train congestion on their parallel lines in central Ontario through the Parry Sound area. Consequently, westbound trains from both railways use the CP tracks while eastbound trains use the CN tracks. This has resulted in Via Rail using the CPR station for passengers taking the westbound Canadian and using the CNR station for eastbound trains.

== CNR station ==
The Tudor Revival Canadian National Railway station is located at 1 Station Street in Parry Sound, Ontario. Built in 1932, it has been used as the primary stop for Via Rail's Canadian transcontinental passenger train service since the massive Via budget cuts on January 15, 1990. From 1955 to 1990 (except 1981–1985) it was a stop on the Super Continental, operated by CN from 1955 to 1977 and by Via from 1977 to 1981 and from 1985 to 1990.

The historical Station has been home to the Parry Sound Area Chamber of Commerce, the MTO, and the Park to Park trail association. In 2021, the station was acquired by global luxury real estate brokerage, Engel & Völkers Parry Sound. In 2022, Engel & Völkers Parry Sound donated the property to Rotary International for use as an orientation and donation centre to assist in the arrival and integration of Ukrainian refugees into the surrounding area during the Russian-Ukrainian War.

== CPR station ==
The Canadian Pacific Railway station is located at 1 Avenue Road. It was used as a stop for Via Rail's Canadian from 1978 until January 15, 1990, after which it sat vacant for a decade until being reactivated as a private art gallery named the "Parry Sound Station Gallery" in 2001. The station was reactivated following the rearrangement of track usage. The art gallery announced in fall 2007 that it would be closing due to financial problems. Via refers to this station as "Parry Sound South" in their reservation system in order to differentiate it from the former CN station. It now functions as an office space for Festival of the Sound, a yearly chamber music festival in Parry Sound, Ontario.

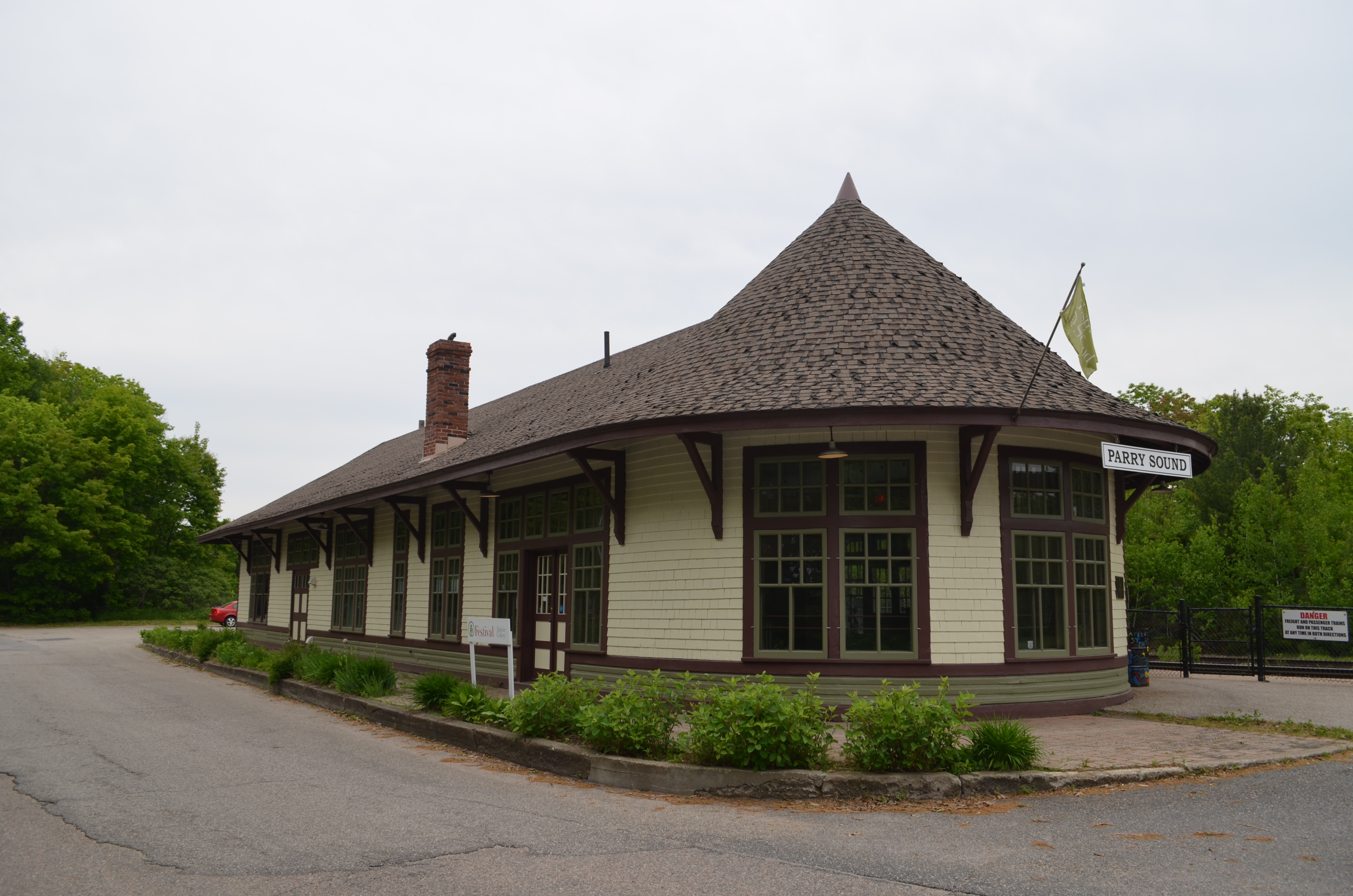
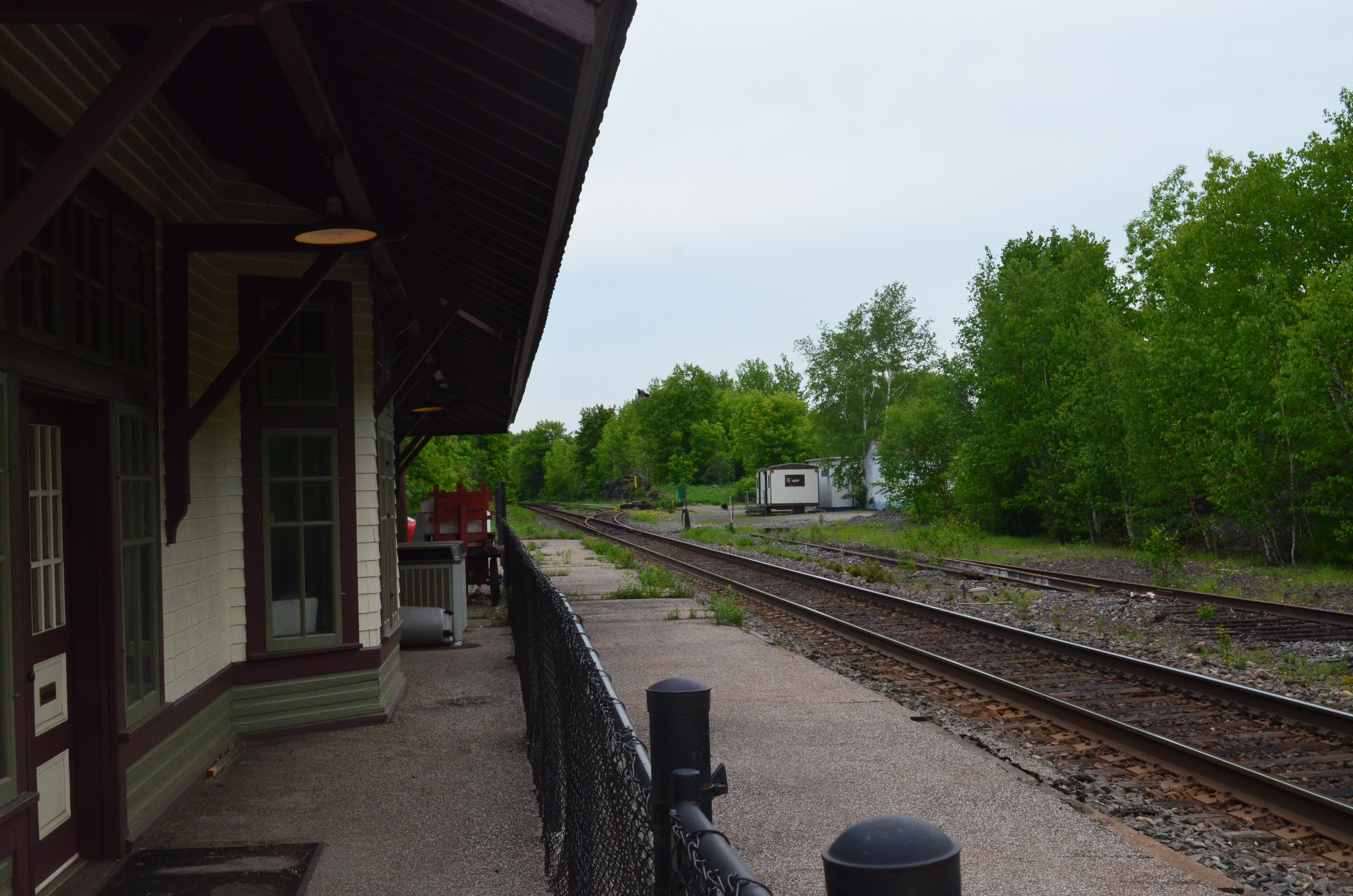
Parry Sound Station Gallery
