= The Canadian =

Train service between Toronto and Vancouver, Canada

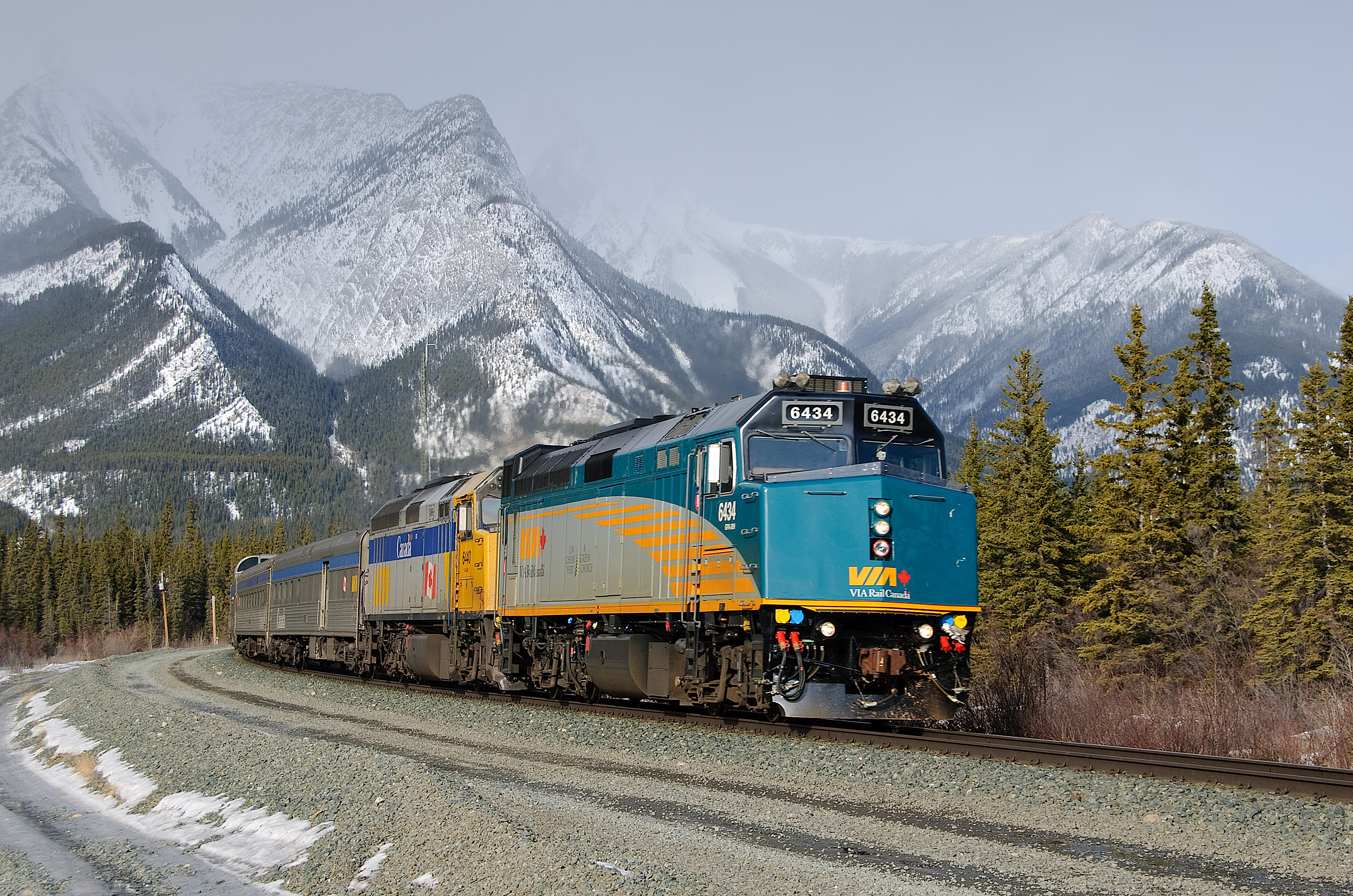
- The westbound Canadian near Jasper, Alberta

Overview
- Service type: Inter-city rail Long distance rail
- Status: Active
- Locale: Canada
- Current operator: Via Rail
- Former operator: Canadian Pacific
- Ridership: 1,467 weekly (2025)
- Annual ridership: 76,285 (2025)
- Website: Via Rail – The Canadian

Route
- Termini: Toronto, Ontario; Vancouver, British Columbia
- Stops: 65 (55 on request only)
- Distance travelled: 4,466 km (2,775 mi)
- Average journey time: Westbound: 97 hours and 5 minutes Eastbound: 92 hours and 29 minutes
- Service frequency: two trains per week in each direction

On-board services
- Classes: Economy, Sleeper, Prestige
- Disabled access: Yes
- Seating arrangements: Coach seating
- Sleeping arrangements: Berths, bedrooms for one, two or three
- Catering facilities: Dining car, Skyline Cafe, take out, in-room service (Prestige Class only), bar
- Observation facilities: Skyline car, park car, panoramic dome car (between Edmonton and Vancouver)
- Entertainment facilities: Artists on Board Program
- Baggage facilities: Checked baggage available at selected stations

Technical
- Rolling stock: F40PH locomotives Skyline series
- Track gauge: 1,435 mm (4 ft 8 1/2 in)
- Operating speed: 80 mph (130 km/h) (maximum)
- Track owners: Metrolinx; Canadian National; Canadian Pacific Kansas City; BNSF
- Timetable numbers: 1 (westbound), 2 (eastbound)

The Canadian (French: Le Canadien) is a transcontinental passenger train operated by Via Rail on its Western Canada service between Union Station in Toronto, Ontario, and Pacific Central Station in Vancouver, British Columbia, Canada.

Canadian Pacific introduced this service on April 24, 1955, serving Montreal, Toronto and Vancouver. In 1978, Via Rail Canada acquired the service, and, on January 15, 1990, designated the Canadian as its sole transcontinental service, between Toronto and Vancouver. The new service replaced the former Super Continental, Canadian National's flagship passenger service, and continues to run primarily over CN tracks.

== History ==
In the years following World War II, passenger trains on the CP consisted of a mixture of prewar heavyweight and pre- and post-war lightweight cars, even on its flagship transcontinental The Dominion and its eastern extension, The Atlantic Limited. While these cars were serviceable, American trains of the early 1950s, such as the California Zephyr, had already adopted streamlined all-stainless steel consists featuring domed observation cars. Following an evaluation in 1949 of the dome cars featured on the General Motors / Pullman Standard demonstrator Train of Tomorrow, CP management, including then-Vice President Norris R. Crump, resolved to upgrade its rolling stock.

In 1953, CP placed an order for 155 stainless steel cars with the Budd Company of Red Lion, Pennsylvania that included 18 rear-end dome cars (Park series), 18 Skyline mid-train dome cars, 30 coaches, 18 dining cars and 71 sleeping cars (Manor and Château series). A subsequent order for 18 baggage-crew dormitory cars brought the final to total to 173 cars: sufficient for establishing an entirely-new transcontinental service and partially re-equipping The Dominion. The interior design of these new cars was contracted to the Philadelphia architectural firm Harbeson, Hough, Livingston & Larson (a company known for its industrial designs on other prominent passenger trains such as the Pioneer Zephyr), and the resulting furnishings and pastel-shaded colour schemes were widely acclaimed.

After deciding to name the Park series dome cars after famous Canadian parks, leading Canadian artists, including members of the Group of Seven, were commissioned to paint suitable murals for these cars. When the decision was made to add budget sleeping cars, the Budd order was supplemented by 22 existing heavyweight sleepers that CP refurbished in its own Angus Shops, each fitted-out with Budd-style stainless steel cladding. To complement the new rolling stock, CP ordered General Motors Diesel FP9 locomotives to supplement an existing fleet of FP7s. Although these F-units remained the preferred power for the train, it would occasionally pulled by a variety of motive power, including Montreal Locomotive Works FPA-2s.

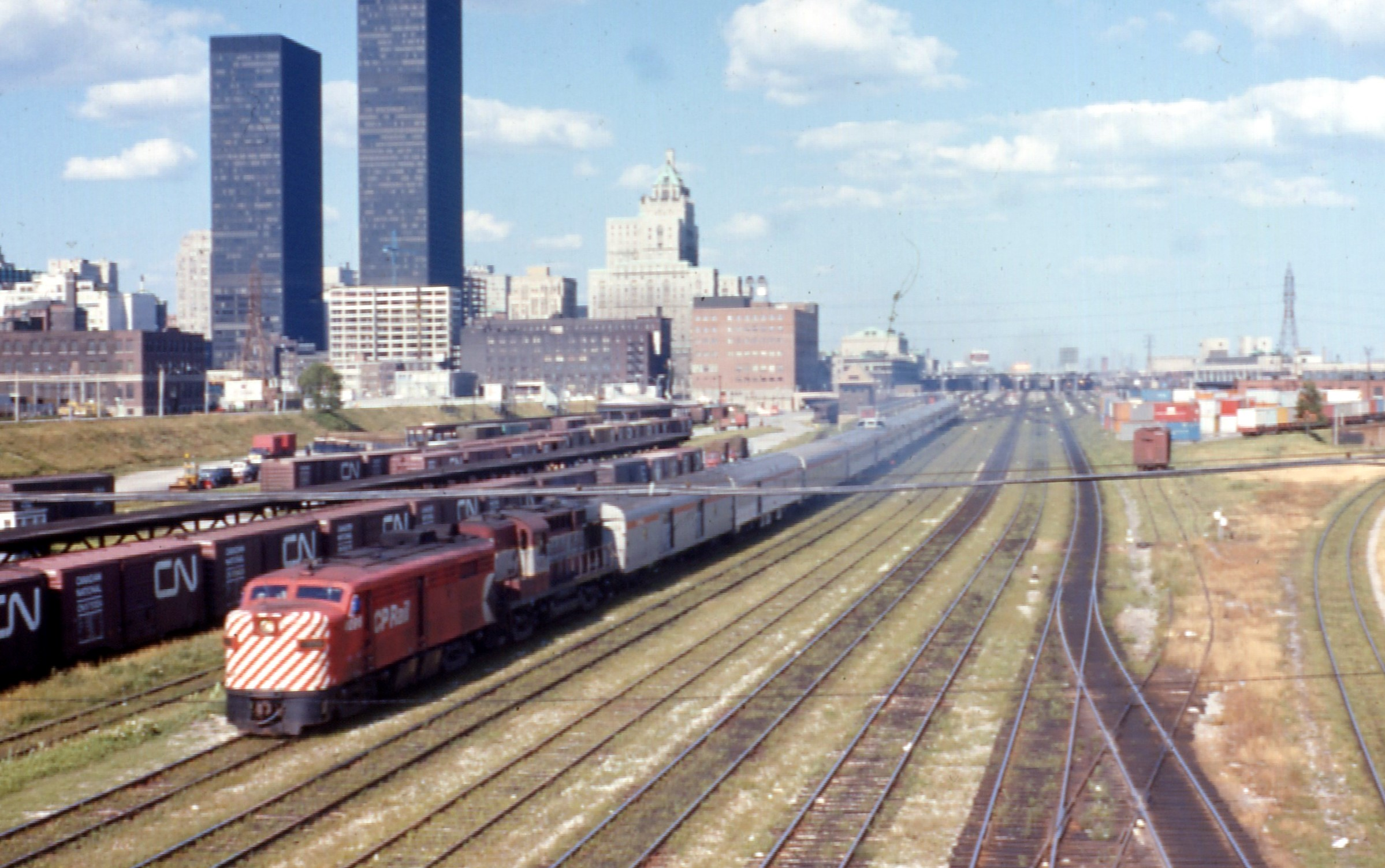
The Canadian leaving Toronto in 1970

=== Service under CP ===
CP christened its new flagship train The Canadian and service began on April 24, 1955. Running time between Montreal and Vancouver was reduced from about 85 to 71 hours, so that passengers spent only three, rather than four, nights en route. Although CP competitor Canadian National Railways began its own new transcontinental service, the Super Continental, on the same day, CP was able to boast honestly that The Canadian was "The first and only all-stainless steel 'dome' stream-liner in Canada" – it was not until 1964 that the CN acquired dome cars from the Milwaukee Road.

The train operated with Montreal and Toronto sections, which ran combined west of Sudbury, Ontario. The Montreal section (also serving Ottawa) was known as train 1 westbound and train 2 eastbound, while the Toronto section was known as train 11 westbound and train 12 eastbound. Matching its streamlined appearance, The Canadian's 71-hour westbound schedule was 16 hours faster than that of The Dominion.

Although initially successful, passenger train ridership began to decline in Canada during the 1960s. Facing competition from new jet aircraft and increased automobile usage following construction of the Trans-Canada Highway, the CP cancelled The Dominion in 1966, and petitioned the government to discontinue The Canadian in 1970. Although this petition was denied, CP during the 1970s attempted to remove itself from the passenger service market. The Canadian was operated at reduced levels, with the government funding 80 percent of its losses.

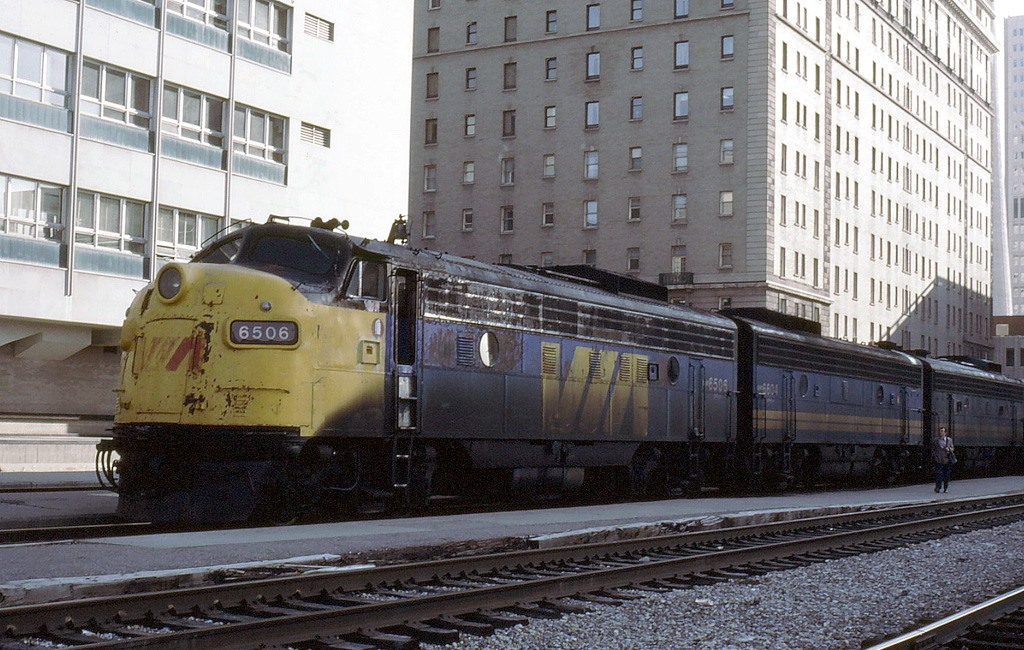
The Canadian in Calgary, 1982

=== Service under Via Rail ===
Via Rail, a federal crown corporation, formally assumed responsibility for CP's passenger services on October 29, 1978, although the Via identity was not assumed by the trains themselves until the following summer. Following the takeover by Via, the Canadian became the company's premier transcontinental train, and initially operated over its old CP route. It was supplemented by the former CN Super Continental, which operated over the parallel, but more northerly, CN route. The Canadian continued to be operated in two sections east of Sudbury and provided daily service west to Vancouver and east to Toronto and Montreal.

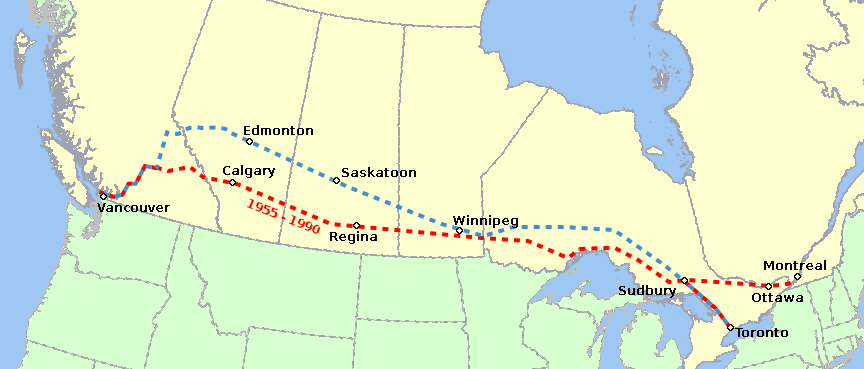
The old (red) and new (blue) routes of The Canadian

The Super Continental was discontinued in 1981 due to sharp budget cuts. Since then, the Canadian has Via Rail's only true transcontinental train. While the Super Continental was brought back in 1985 amid popular demand, it only ran as far east as Winnipeg.

In the aftermath of another round of deep budget cuts made to Via Rail on January 15, 1990, Via again discontinued the Super Continental, this time permanently. The Canadian was moved from CP trackage to the CN route plied by the Super Continental for its first quarter-century, dropping the Montreal section. The new longer route bypassed Thunder Bay, Regina and Calgary in favour of Saskatoon and Edmonton. This maintained transcontinental service and allowed Via to operate its government-mandated service to small communities along the line. At the same time, the absence of transportation alternatives along the CP route allowed entrepreneur Peter Armstrong to develop the Rocky Mountaineer excursion service. Moreover, while pre-1990 schedules had daily service on both the CP and CN routes, service following the 1990 cuts was a mere three days per week, reduced further to two times a week in the off-season.

In 2007, the schedule was lengthened so that the train now takes four nights, rather than three, to travel between Toronto and Vancouver. The four-night schedule is almost identical (in terms of travel time) with that of the 1940s, despite substantial technological change since then.

In 2013, the train was honoured by being featured on the back of the new polymer Canadian ten-dollar note.

As of 2022, Via Rail continues to operate the Canadian using the rebuilt ex-CP Budd passenger equipment.

Due to CN's shortage of capacity on the cross-country line, 12-hour delays had become almost standard. On-time performance had fallen from 84% in 2009 to just 8% in 2017. Continuing delays reached nearly 2 days in length by mid-May, 2018. To address this issue, the schedule was lengthened again, effective July 26, 2018, to four days and four nights in each direction due to continuing schedule-reliability problems on the host railway: CN. This change has almost entirely resolved the issue.

The Canadian currently takes 94 hours 15 minutes westbound vs. 95 hours 29 minutes eastbound. This is 13h50m vs. 12h19m slower than the Super Continental's 80h25m vs. 83h10m and 13h5m vs. 12h24m slower than the Dominion's 81h10m vs. 83h5m schedules from 1952. The difference is entirely due to CN freight traffic being prioritized over passenger traffic along the route.

=== Current operations ===
When operating on the normal schedule, the Canadian operates twice per week, departing Toronto on Wednesdays and Sundays and Vancouver on Mondays and Fridays. The total journey takes about four days.

The great majority of stations operate as flag stops; passengers boarding or detraining at these stops must give advance notice. On March 21, 2020, the Canadian and most other Via Rail services were suspended due to the pandemic. This suspension continued until December 11, to accommodate inspection and repair work as part of its Heritage Modernization Program. Beginning December 11, the Canadian was reinstated between Winnipeg and Vancouver only and ran once a week. Service to Toronto resumed on May 17, 2021, still operating once a week.

=== Service disruptions ===
In January 2020, service on the Canadian (along with nearly all of Via's other services) was suspended due to the 2020 Canadian pipeline and railway protests and blockades at several points along CN and Metrolinx lines. Partial service was restored in early March.

However, less than a month after the blockades were lifted, the COVID-19 pandemic and the closing of the Canada-US border temporarily impacted nearly all Via Rail services. While reduced service continued on the Corridor, all overnight trains except the Winnipeg-Churchill run were initially cancelled. Around 1000 employees across the system were temporarily laid off. Service was gradually restored in stages, with the Toronto-Winnipeg portion of the route being restored first. Service along the full Toronto-Vancouver route was finally restored in December 2020, with a single train running once a week in each direction.

In response to these two major disruptions, Via amended its cancellation policies to allow changes without penalty and full refunds.

In November 2021, service west of Winnipeg was impacted by the November 2021 Pacific Northwest floods. The November 13 westbound train out of Toronto, which was already underway when the floods hit, was halted at Winnipeg. Passengers with final destinations west of Winnipeg were bussed or flown to their final destinations. Service was not restored until December 12. Subsequent trains were significantly delayed between Edmonton and Vancouver by the supply chain backlog of previously stalled freight trains.

== Classes of service ==
The Canadian offers three main classes of service: Economy, Sleeper Plus, and, since 2014, Prestige. Trains are equipped with one or more dining cars: at least one Skyline (dome) car per class, a Panorama car (west of Edmonton), and a Park car. All classes have access to their own Skyline car; Sleeper Plus and Prestige passengers also have access to the Panorama car. Prestige passengers have semi-exclusive access to the Park car, a licensed lounge at the back of the train. Onboard talks and activities are scheduled during the summer months. If a singer or musical group is travelling with the train, separate performances will be available to each class of service.

Sleeper Plus and Prestige passengers have access to the Via Rail business lounge, if available at that station. Prestige passengers are offered exclusive access to a dedicated business lounge area. Sleeper Plus and Prestige passengers are pre-boarded at a separate area of the train from Economy class passengers; the Prestige rooms are at the very back of the train. One concierge is assigned to every sleeper car, or sometimes to two sleeper cars.

In economy class, passengers have reclining seats. Sleeper Plus has a choice of upper/lower berths, a roomette for one, or a cabin for two that features chairs or facing sofa seats during the day and beds at night. Some berths can accommodate two persons, while other cabins can be combined to create a four-person space during the day. Prestige cabins are significantly larger and include a larger window, a television, and sofa that converts into a double bed. Economy and Sleeper Plus have one washroom per car, while Sleeper Plus roomettes and cabins for two include private washroom facilities, and access to a shared shower in each car. Prestige has both private washroom facilities and private showers.

Sleeper Plus and Prestige include three-course meals in a dining car, including non-alcoholic drinks during meals and coffee/tea/snacks at all hours. Prestige includes access to unlimited drinks, including alcoholic drinks, with room service provided. Economy passengers have access to a cafe car with light meals available for purchase. A Sleeper class which included accommodation but no meals was discontinued in 2015. Meals include breakfast, lunch, and dinner. Breakfast is open seating, with an additional continental breakfast available in the Skyline car. Lunch and dinner are served in two or three seatings, usually chosen the previous evening.

The Canadian makes extended smoke stops at some stations, which are the only times that smoking is permitted on Via rail property.

== Route ==
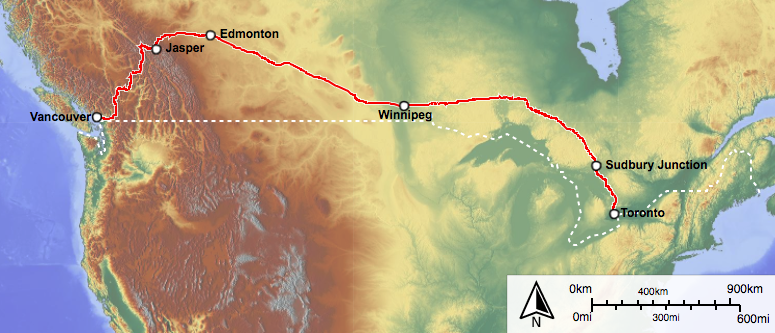
Route map of the Canadian

The Canadian's eastbound journey begins at Vancouver's Pacific Central Station. It uses the BNSF Railway's tracks through suburban communities until it reaches the New Westminster Bridge, where trains cross the Fraser River. The Canadian then uses Canadian National (CN) tracks through the eastern Fraser Valley. Trains then switch between CN and CPKC tracks for 249 kilometres (155 mi) from Mission to Kamloops through the use of directional running through the Fraser and Thompson River canyons. Eastbound trains use the CPKC lines, and westbound trains use the CN tracks. The CN route passes through Painted Canyon, and features CN's 240-metre (800 ft) steel-arched bridge over the Fraser River and the CPKC mainline at Cisco. The tracks in Painted Canyon are only approximately 61 metres (200 ft) above the Thompson River. On their regular schedules, both east and westbound Canadians travel through the Fraser and Thompson river canyons at night.

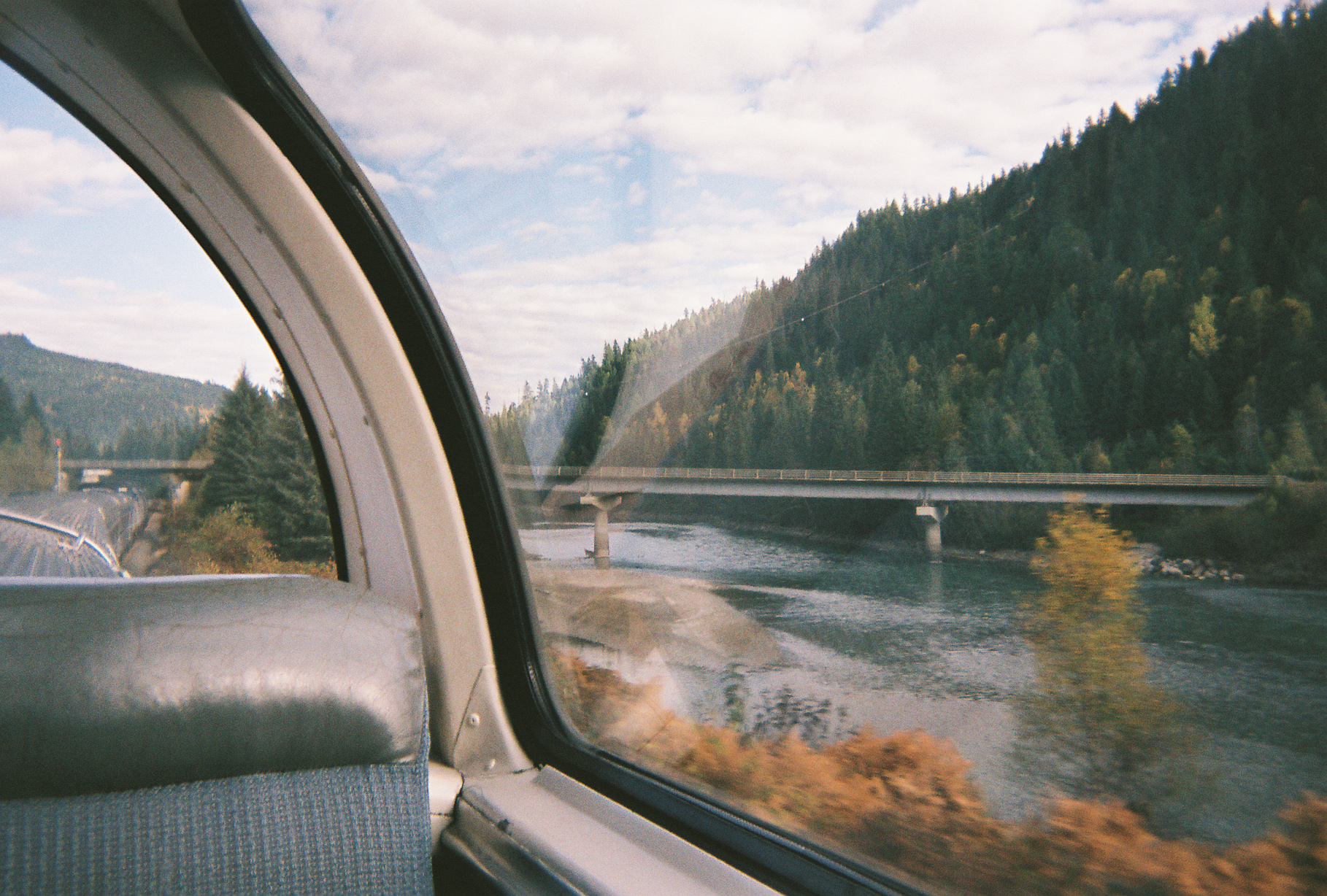
The North Thompson River and bridge from the train

From Kamloops North station, the tracks run north and follow the North Thompson River. The icefields of the Albreda Glacier are visible from the route, which is protected by railway slide fences. From Valemount station to Redpass Junction, eastbound and westbound trains routes again diverge. Eastbound trains use CN's Albreda Subdivision through Mount Robson Provincial Park; westbound trains use CN's Robson Subdivision, which is lower in elevation.

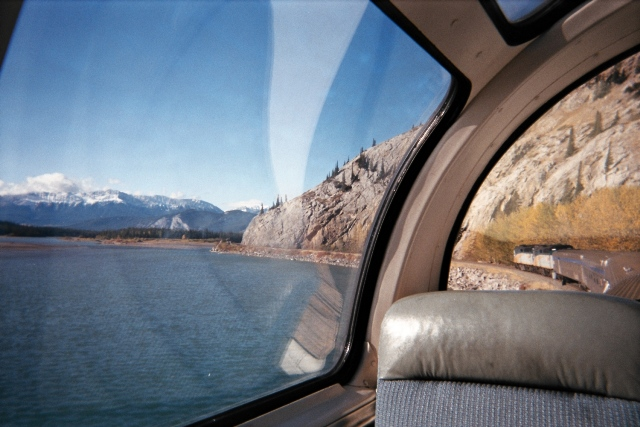
Jasper Lake with mountains in the distance as seen from the Canadian

The Canadian travels past Moose Lake and follows the Fraser to Yellowhead Lake. The train crosses the Continental Divide of the Americas at Yellowhead Pass, which at 3,718 ft (1,133 m) is the lowest crossing of the divide in North America. The pass also marks the boundaries between British Columbia and Alberta, the Pacific and Mountain time zones, the Pacific and Arctic watersheds, and Mount Robson Provincial Park and Jasper National Park. The route passes the Victoria Cross Range above the Miette River and runs through tunnels to reach the Jasper train station, where trains take an extended servicing break. The station itself was declared a heritage railway station by the federal government in 1992.

From Jasper, the train runs along the Athabasca River and descends into the Athabasca Valley, where it has views of nearby mountains and passes Henry House. The Yellowhead Highway (Highway 16) continues to parallel the route. The route follows the west shore of Jasper Lake, a common location for railway photography, and passes near local sand dunes. The route continues northeast and leaves the Canadian Rockies as the terrain opens up into wide plains. The Canadian reverses at a wye to reach Edmonton station in the outskirts of the city, where a long servicing stop is scheduled.

The train continues southeast across the Canadian prairies for nearly 470 kilometres (290 mi), making stops in several rural communities before leaving Alberta for Saskatchewan. The Canadian enters Saskatoon from the west and stops at Saskatoon station in the southwestern outskirts of the city. The route rejoins the CN mainline and enters Manitoba, where it begins to follow the Trans-Canada Highway. It then continues east towards Winnipeg, where the tracks turn north along the Assiniboine River to enter the historic Winnipeg Union Station in the city center. The station also serves as the terminus to the Winnipeg–Churchill train.

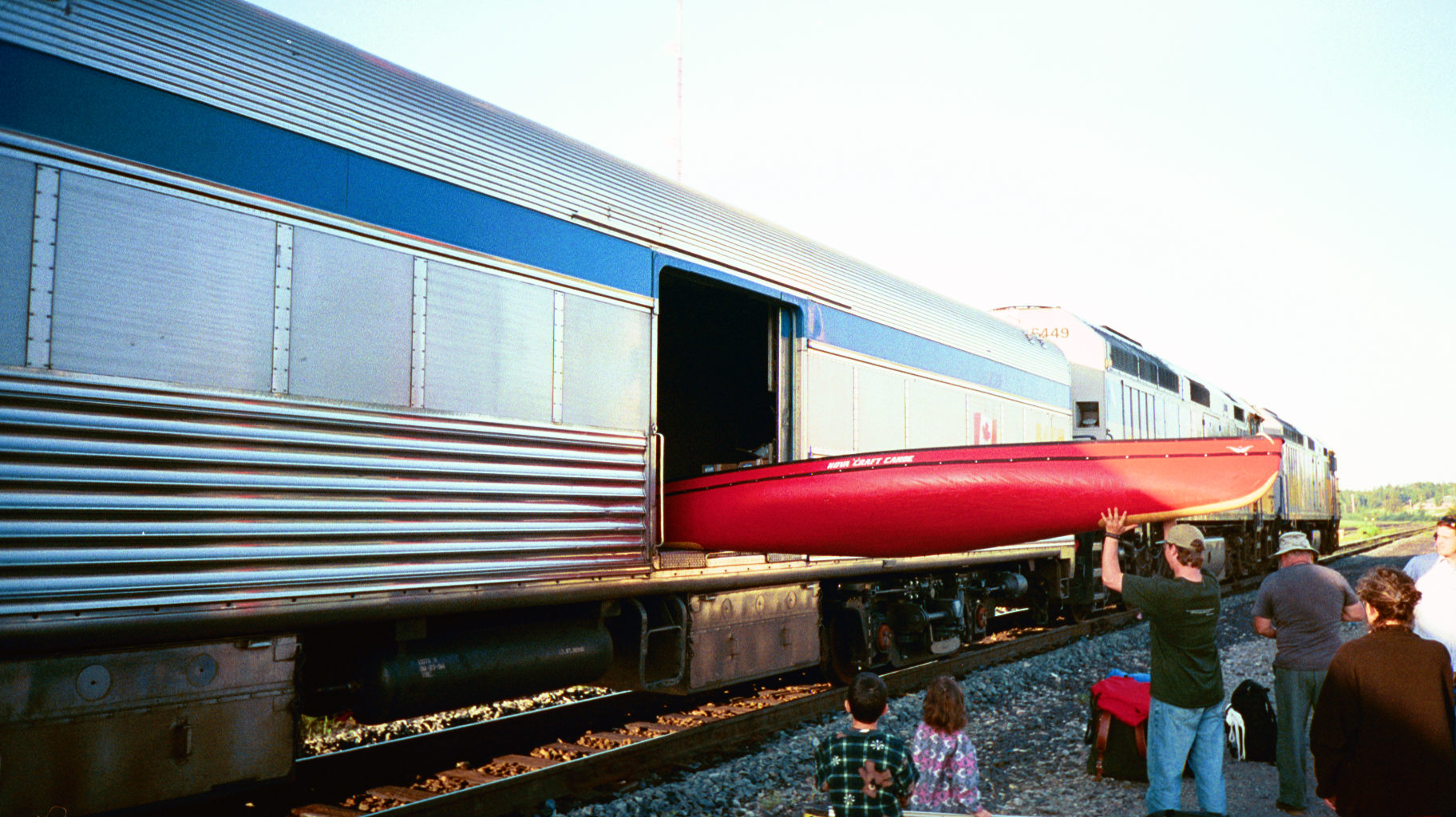
The Canadian picking up a canoeist in central Ontario

The Canadian enters Ontario and crosses the rugged Canadian Shield, where it has flag stops in many small communities that are primarily accessed by rail. Between Winnipeg and Capreol, passengers may request to be dropped off or picked up at any location. At Sudbury, the train stops at Sudbury Junction; a separate station in the city serves the Sudbury–White River line. The Canadian then turns south towards and reaches another section of CN–CPKC directional running from Wanup to Parry Sound. Eastbound trains use the CN Bala Subdivision, while westbound trains use the CPKC's Parry Sound Subdivision, which traverses the Parry Sound CPR Trestle. Through Parry Sound, all trains make use of separate stations depending on the direction of travel.

From Bala, the train continues along CN trackage for approximately 40 km (25 mi) to Washago, its penultimate eastbound stop. The train travelled through and stopped at Barrie and Orillia via the Newmarket Subdivision until the section was abandoned in the 1990s. South of Bloomington, the route is shared with GO Transit's Richmond Hill line commuter services, which uses separate stations. The Canadian reaches Toronto and follows Don River for its final 10 km before terminating at Toronto Union Station. Westbound trains leave Union Station either from the east as it came in from (if turned around prior), or from the west via the Newmarket Subdivision, shared by GO Transit's Barrie line, until Snyder Diamond in Vaughan. At this point, the train backs up for about five minutes in order to connect with the York Subdivision. After that, the train heads eastbound towards Thornhill in western Markham to meet up with the Bala Subdivision at Doncaster Diamond and from there continue Northwest leaving the Greater Toronto Area towards Washago and eventually Vancouver.

== Ridership, funding, and fares ==
In 2025, the train served 76,285 passengers receiving government support of $685 per entrained passenger or $0.52 per passenger mile. Because the Canadian is used primarily by tourists, this funding has been the source of criticism.

Via offers discounted/complimentary transportation for Canadian musicians willing to entertain passengers through their "Artists on Board" program.

== Use in popular culture ==
- A documentary on The Canadian is featured on the Discovery Channel’s TV show Mighty Trains in Season One, Episode Three.
- The Canadian is the setting for Murder on the Canadian, a children's mystery novel by Eric Wilson.
