= Ontario Northland Railway =

Railway in Northern Ontario, Canada

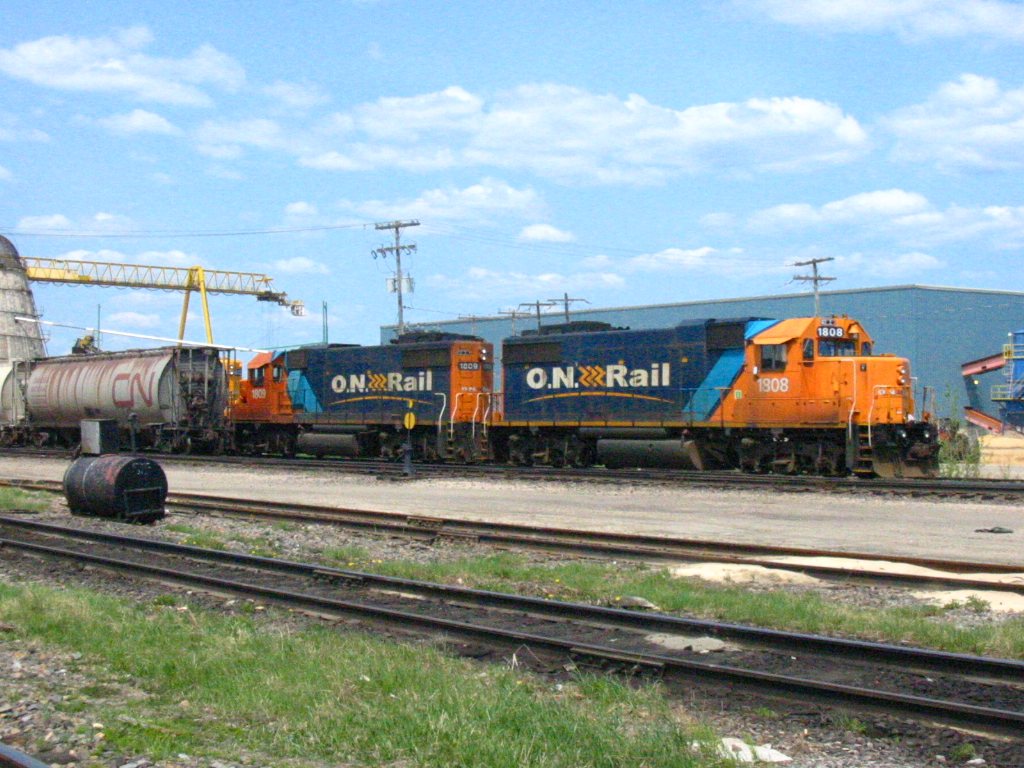
- A pair of Ontario Northland diesel locomotives in Hearst in 2003.

Overview
- Fleet: 24 active locomotives (2019)
- Parent company: Ontario Northland
- Headquarters: 555 Oak Street East, North Bay, Ontario, Canada
- Reporting mark: ONT
- Locale: Northeastern Ontario
- Dates of operation: 1902–present

Technical
- Track gauge: 1,435 mm (4 ft 8 1/2 in)
- Track length: 1,291 km (802 mi) mainline track

Other
- Website: ontarionorthland.ca

The Ontario Northland Railway (reporting mark ONT) is a Canadian railway operated by Ontario Northland, a provincial Crown agency of the government of Ontario.

Originally built to develop the Lake Timiskaming and Lake Nipissing areas, the railway soon became a major factor in the economic growth of the province. After decades of difficult construction through the Canadian Shield, workers reached James Bay in 1932. While blasting the route through the shield, geologists discovered deposits of valuable minerals such as gold, silver, copper and nickel. The railway also made it possible to exploit the timber resources of Northern Ontario.

Its 705-kilometre (438 mi) north–south main line is located entirely in Ontario, starting at its southern terminus at Washago, running northward through North Bay, Cobalt, New Liskeard, Cochrane, and on to its northern terminus at Moosonee on the Moose River, about 19 kilometres (12 mi) south of the shore of James Bay. There is one major branchline running eastward from Swastika through Kirkland Lake and over the Quebec border to end at Rouyn-Noranda. The railway's branch from Swastika to Rouyn-Noranda, including 40 kilometres (25 mi) of track in Quebec, is operated by a subsidiary, the Nipissing Central Railway.

Shorter spur lines also exist running west from Rock Junction to Sherman Mine, south-west from Porquis Junction to Kidd Creek Mine, about 22 kilometres (14 mi) east of Timmins, north-east from Porquis to Iroquois Falls and south from Opaz Junction to Agrium mine site. Several other mining spurs opened and closed with the mines they served. Since 1993, the ONR operates a section of the National Transcontinental Railway running west from Cochrane to Calstock.

== History ==
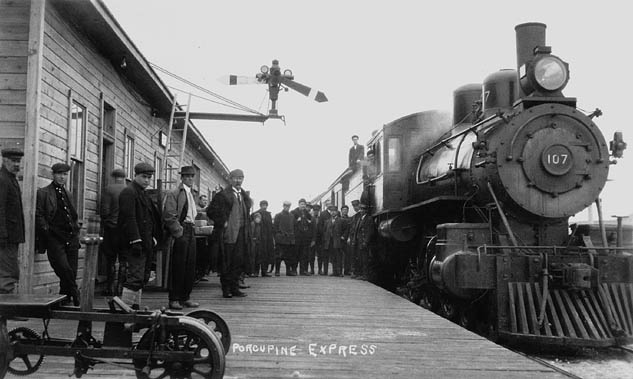
Porcupine Express, Temiskaming and Northern Ontario Railway, c. 1910

=== James Bay Railway ===
The line was originally chartered as the Lake Nipissing And James Bay Railway in 1884. The original route ran roughly northward from Callander to Moose River on James Bay. However, in 1902, before construction started, the Canadian Northern Railway (CNoR) took over the charter and used it as the basis for a new line running northwest from Parry Sound to Sudbury, with an additional line running from Parry Sound south to Toronto. The section running south to Toronto opened on November 6, 1906. The northern section was completed in 1908, although by this time it had been rechartered as part of the Canadian Northern Ontario Railway (CNOR).

=== Temiskaming and Northern Ontario Railway (1902–46) ===
With the original plans having been dropped, and a railway on this route still desired, the new Temiskaming and Northern Ontario Railway was incorporated on 17 March 1902, by the Temiskaming and Northern Ontario Railway Act of the Ontario parliament. The railway was to be a provincial Crown corporation overseen by the Temiskaming and Northern Ontario Railway Commission. Construction on the railway started in 1903, and the settlement of Redwater in the municipality of Temagami began as a small request stop when the railway reached the area of the Lower and Upper Redwater Lakes.

As it passed by Long Lake, near the 103 mile marker, the largest silver rush in Canada was sparked by workers looking for trees for railway ties. The town of Cobalt grew out of the fortunes of silver taken from the grounds. By 1905, it reached New Liskeard in the Lake Timiskaming area. The railway reached Englehart in 1906 and Cochrane in 1909. In the next few years, several branch lines were built.

In 1921, construction on a line north to James Bay was started. In 1923, the new Conservative premier of Ontario, Howard Ferguson, halted further construction, saying that it would be unprofitable. For four years the terminus of the line remained at Fraserdale, near Abitibi Canyon, where the Abitibi Canyon Generating Station was being built on the Abitibi River. Between 1928 and 1930 the railway was extended north at a slow pace. The pace of construction was quickened in 1930 as a make-work project due to the depression. The extension to James Bay was opened on July 15, 1932. The terminus of the railway was at the mouth of the Moose River near the old trading post of Revillon Frères. It was named Moosonee, from the Cree meaning "at the moose".

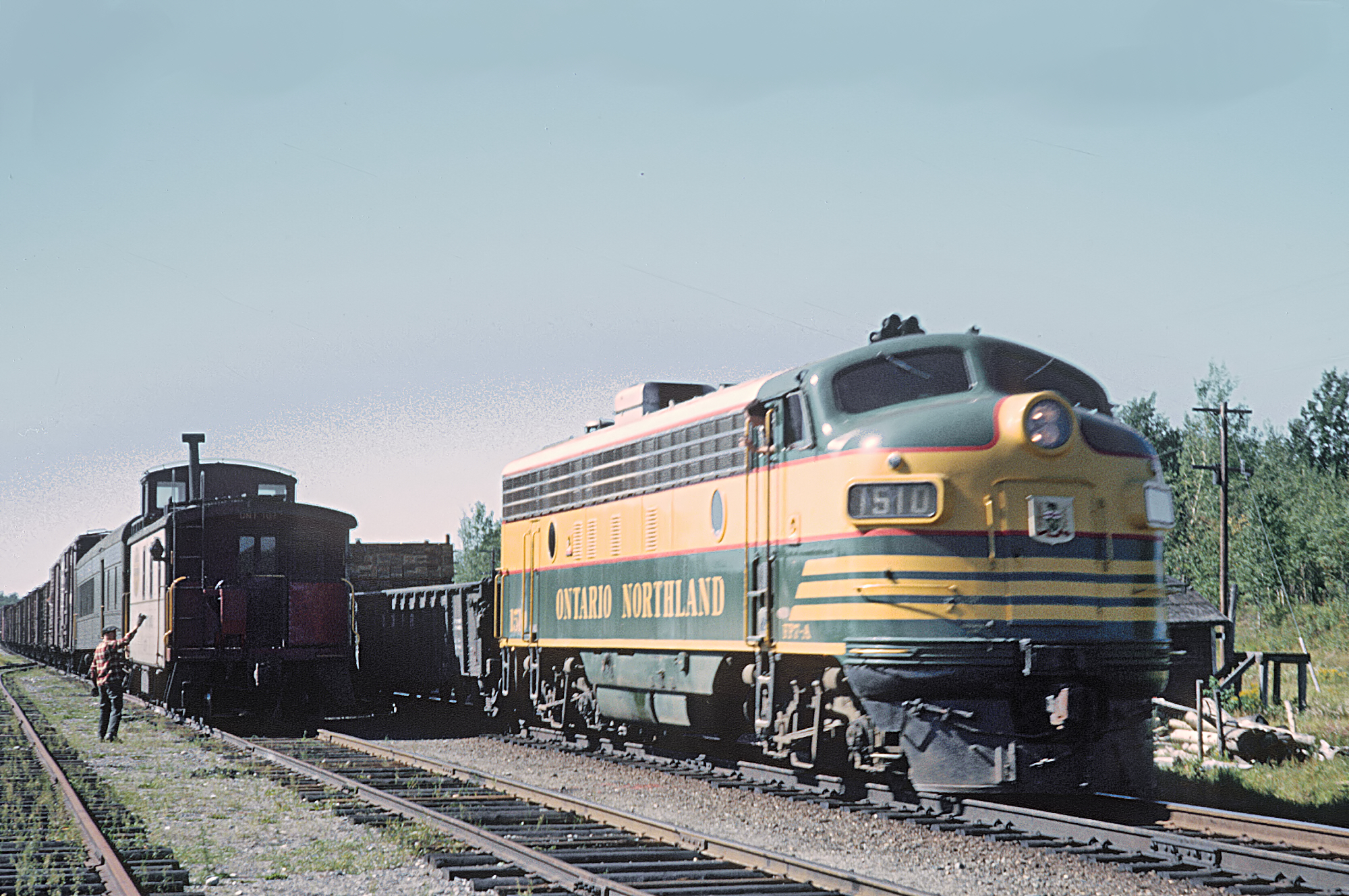
Ontario Northland freight trains in 1965

A name change for the railway was first proposed in 1942 by Arthur Cavanagh, who was chairman of the commission between 1940 and 1944. He noted that it would have the advantage of associating the railway with the province, not just the District of Timiskaming. A name change would also avoid confusion with the Texas and New Orleans Railway, which had the same initials. The Ontario railway often had boxcars misdirected in the United States, while receiving invoices that should have gone to Texas. The railway's name was changed to the Ontario Northland Railway on April 5, 1946, when a bill amending the Temiskaming and Northern Ontario Railway Act received assent.

=== 1946–2010 ===
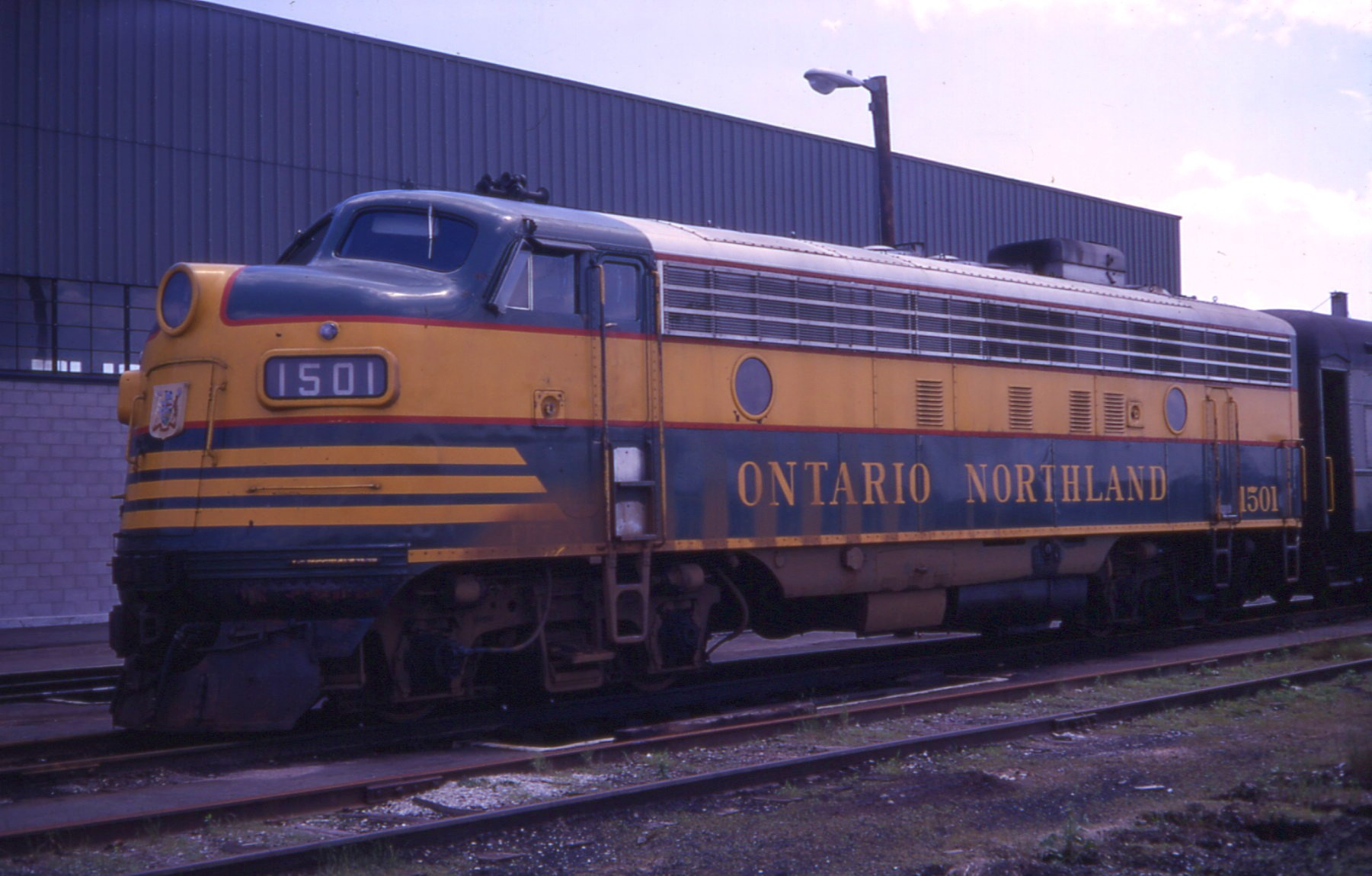
GMD FP7 #1501 at the Mimico Shops in 1968.

Three new mines were opened in Northern Ontario in the 1960s. Sherman Mine in Temagami was opened in 1968, Adams Mine in Kirkland Lake in 1963, and Kidd Creek Mine in Timmins in 1967. The Ontario Northland Railway built spurs to serve these mines.

In 1993, CN applied to abandon sections of its underused former National Transcontinental Railway mainline across northern Ontario (it had previously abandoned the portion of the line between Calstock and Nakina in 1988). The portion between Calstock and Cochrane was sold to ONR.

In December 2000, the Ontario government announced that it would be privatizing the railway. CN submitted a bid in March 2002, and in October the government gave it exclusive rights to negotiate a purchase of the railway. However, the deal fell through on July 2, 2003, over the government's insistence on job guarantees, and the railway remained in public hands. On February 25, 2005, CN and ONR signed a routing agreement in which ONR would transport CN's freight traffic between Noranda and either Hearst or North Bay.

On April 14, 2010, there was news of a proposed Ontario Northland takeover of the controversial Ottawa Valley rail tracks. However, this development never came to fruition.

=== Proposed divestment, end of the Northlander, restructuring (2012–2014) ===
On March 23, 2012, the Ontario government announced that it would begin to wind down the ONTC, citing increased costs to the government and stagnant ridership. ONR passenger train service between Toronto and Cochrane (the Northlander) was withdrawn and replaced with an augmented bus service, and all of the corporation's assets were to be sold off. On August 16, the Ontario Government announced that Northlander train service would end on September 28, 2012, and Ontera will be sold off.

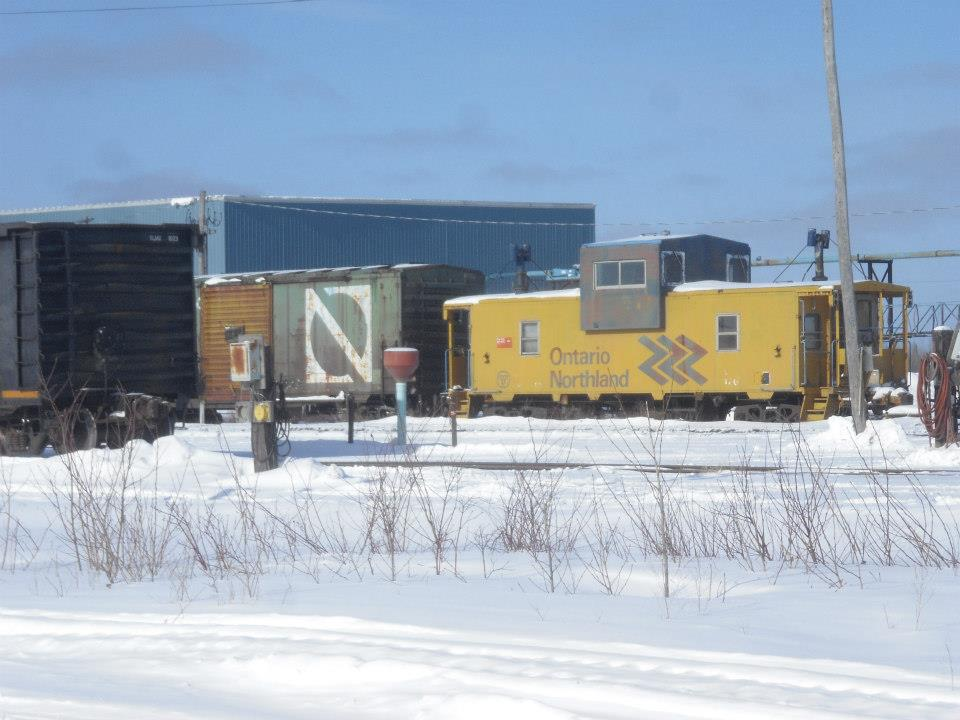
ONR Caboose in Hearst in 2013

Northern Ontario municipal leaders had continued to express their fears regarding the divestment. They indicated that the ONR provides a fundamental link to many remote and rural communities and provides freight transport to many companies, including mining and forestry, allowing them to thrive. They indicate that the government maintained its funding to the GO Transit network in Southern Ontario and it is important to not forget about the important service the ONR provides to Northern Ontario residents. In February 2014, the new premier of Ontario, Kathleen Wynne, met with northern community leaders and the head of the company and union to discuss the future of the company. They decided the union and management would present a reconstruction plan to the government for consideration.

In late February 2014 a report to restructure the ONTC was delivered to the Minister of Northern Development and Mines. The proposal detailed how the organization could be modernized both culturally and in job reductions through attrition. The report was well received by the minister who appreciated how management and labour come together to explore options for the corporation.

In April 2014 the provincial government concluded the company would remain in public hands. However, Ontera (its telecommunication division) would be sold off to Bell Aliant. The government would reinvest in the company to purchase new coaches and refurbish rolling stock for the Polar Bear Express. This decision was supported by other members of Provincial Parliament after the auditor general's review cited that it would have cost the taxpayer $820 million instead of saving $265.9 million over three years had the divestment proceeded.

=== Plans to resume Northlander passenger service ===
In December 2020, the province released the draft transportation plan for northern Ontario which recommended continuing to move forward on a plan for passenger rail services. In May 2021, the provincial government announced plans for Ontario Northland and Metrolinx to write a business plan to resume passenger operations between Toronto and northeastern Ontario with a 13-stop route to begin service by the mid-2020s. In November 2021, the decision was made to make the new terminus Timmins (previously Cochrane) due to its size and the fact that it serves as a regional transportation hub. Test runs were conducted in March and November 2021, where several northern Ontario mayors, MPPs, and local residents were taken from North Bay to Toronto's Union Station.

In December 2022, the provincial government announced that it would purchase three new train sets from Siemens Mobility at a cost of $140 million. Each train set would consist of a Charger locomotive and three Venture passenger cars. The train sets are for the restoration of Northlander train service between Toronto and Cochrane, which would operate four to seven times per week depending on season. There would be 16 stops: Toronto (Union Station), Langstaff, Gormley, Washago, Gravenhurst, Bracebridge, Huntsville, South River, North Bay, Temagami, Temiskaming Shores, Englehart, Kirkland Lake/Swastika, Matheson, Timmins and Cochrane.

In February 2026, the provincial government purchased the northern portion of the Newmarket Subdivision from CN for $138 million, extending the Ontario Northland track network southward by 205 kilometres (127 mi) to Washago.

== Passenger trains ==
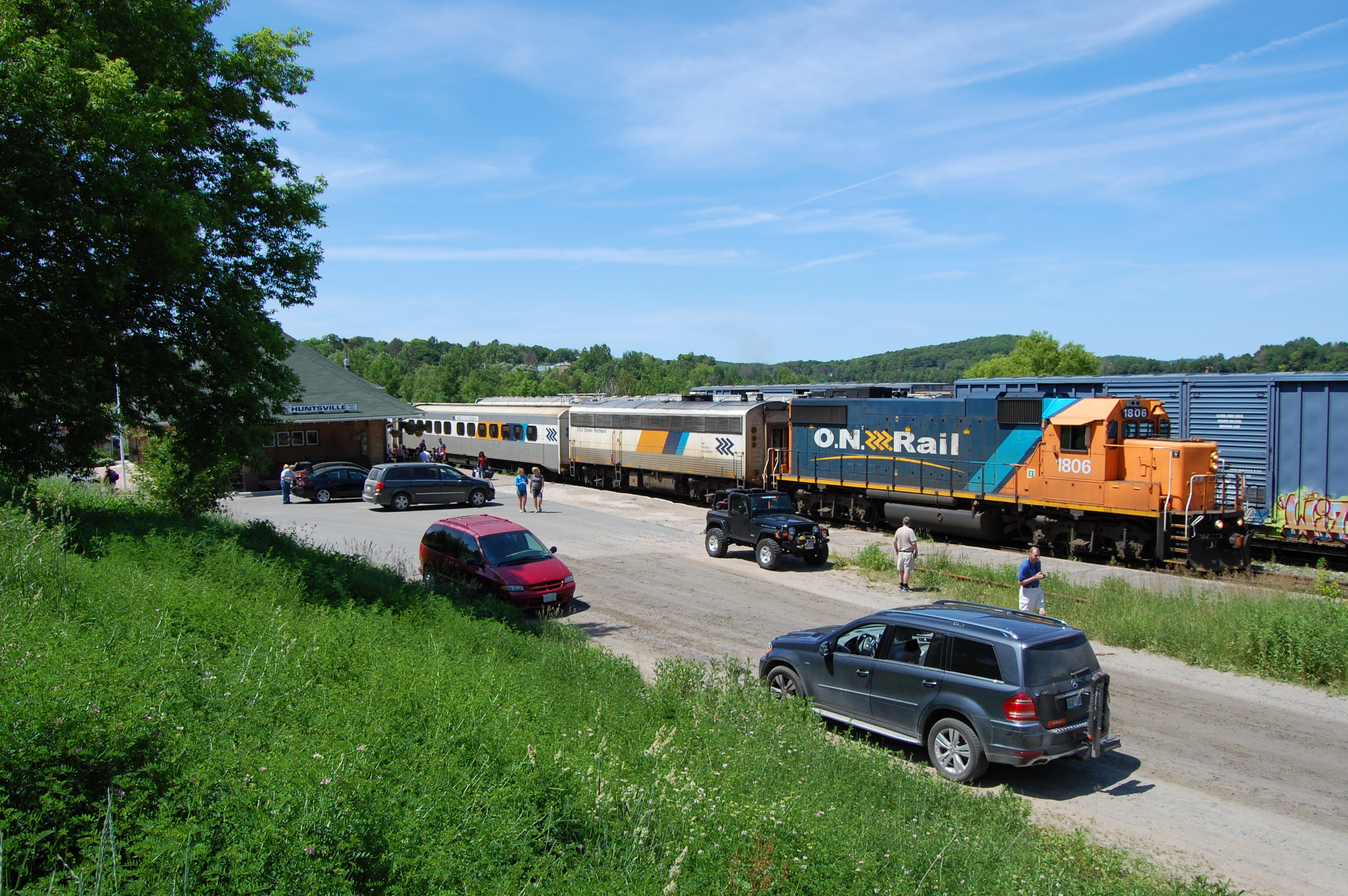
The Northlander passenger train stopped at Huntsville station in 2011

ONR operates or formerly operated the following passenger services:

- The Northlander operated between Toronto and Cochrane six days per week year-round until September 28, 2012, when the Government of Ontario discontinued the train and replaced it with bus service. In May 2021, the Ontario government announced plans to restore Northlander passenger rail service between Toronto and northeastern Ontario, with service expected to resume on December 10, 2026. The restored service is planned to operate four to seven days per week depending on seasonal travel demand.
- The Polar Bear Express operates between Cochrane and Moosonee five days per week during the winter and six days per week during the summer. The train operates as a flag stop service. In June 2007, the Polar Bear Express was expanded from a seasonal excursion train into a year-round passenger service, replacing the Little Bear mixed freight and passenger train, which had operated three days per week. The replacement mixed train carries freight equipment including boxcars and flatcars for passenger vehicles.
- The Dream Catcher Express, an autumn excursion train, operated between North Bay and Temagami. The service began in 2005 and ended in 2012.

In April 2022, the Ontario government announced a CA$75 million investment in infrastructure improvements associated with the restoration of Northlander service between Toronto and Timmins. New trainsets entered testing in 2026 ahead of the planned resumption of service later that year.

== Freight services ==
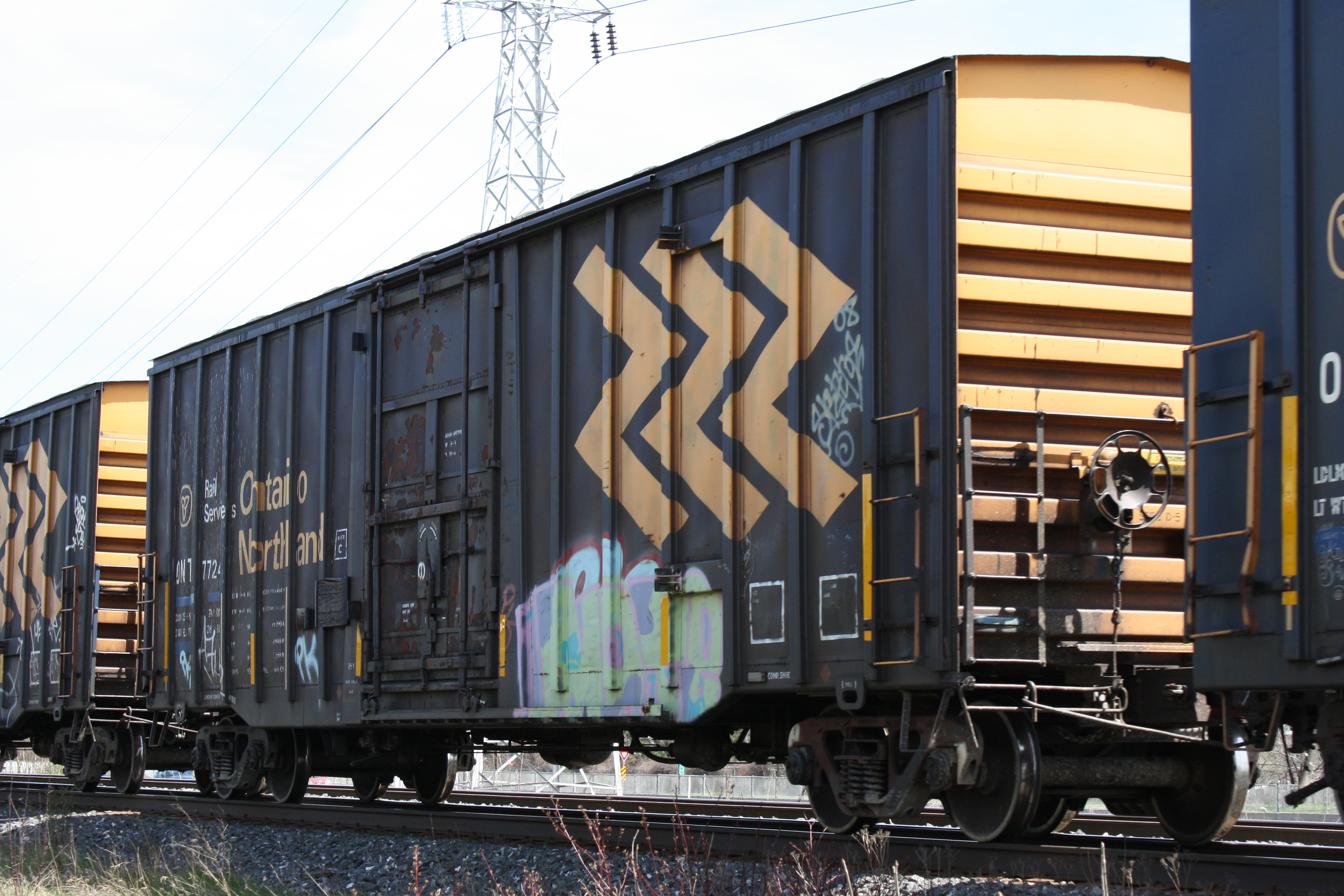
An ONR boxcar.

Connections with other railway systems are made as follows:

- North Bay (CN and Ottawa Valley Railway, which connects to CP)
- Hearst (Algoma Central Railway)
- Rouyn-Noranda (CN)

There are a series of regular runs including:

- North Bay to Cochrane – Weekdays
- North Bay to Timmins (Hallnor) – Weekdays
- North Bay to Rouyn, QC – Daily (except Saturday)
- Cochrane to Hearst – Weekdays
- Cochrane to Moosonee – Tuesday and Friday
- Hearst to Agrium Mine Site – Daily

== Locomotives and rolling stock ==
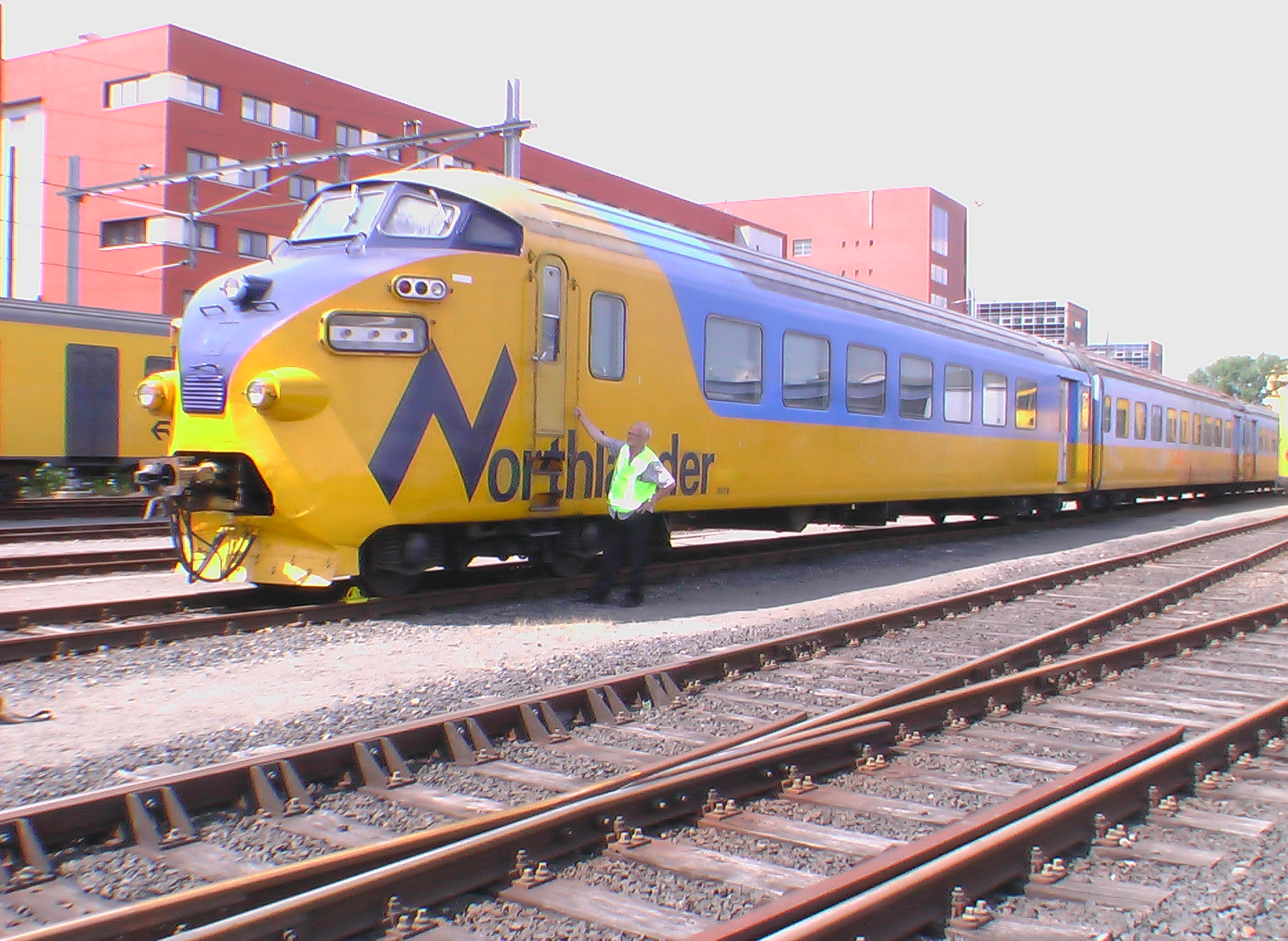
ex-ONR TEE set used by Northlander now relocated to Zwolle in the Netherlands

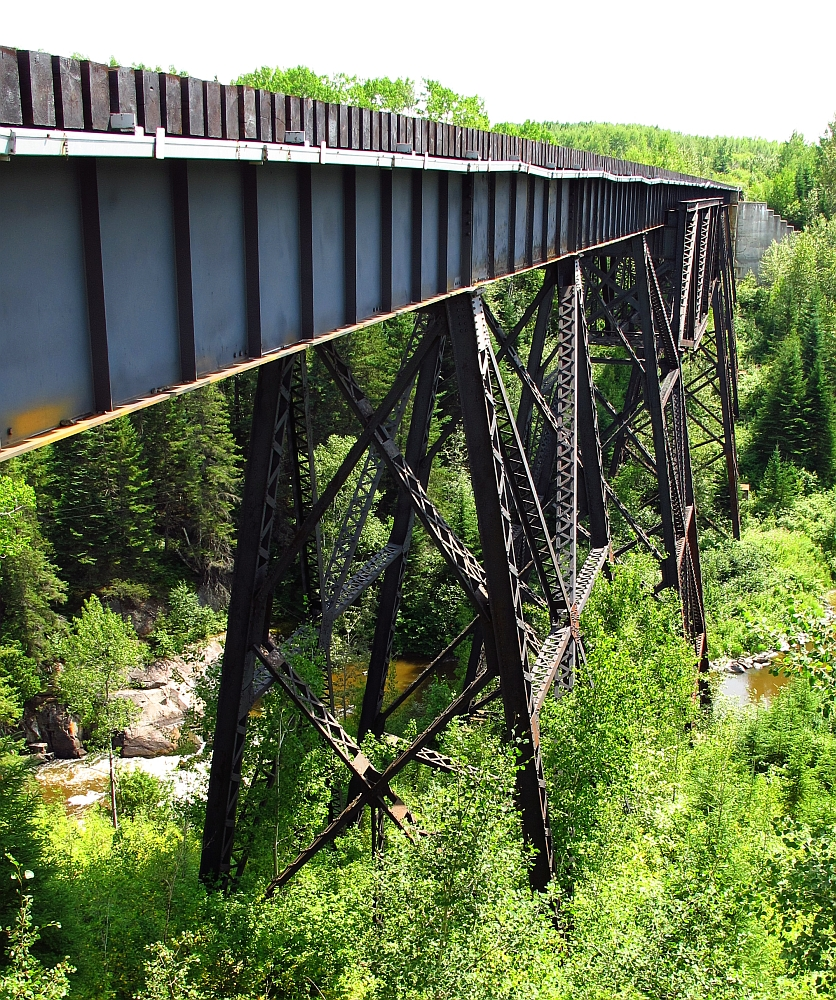
Trestle over Blanche River north of Englehart

The railway currently owns about 25 diesel locomotives and roughly 700 items of rolling stock. One of its more unusual pieces of rolling stock is a canoe car, which is in service in the summer as part of the Polar Bear Express passenger train. The car can hold up to 18 canoes. Canoeists can put canoes on this car as part of their baggage, although canoes are often stowed in boxcars. It is the only known train car specifically designed for transporting canoes and kayaks.

In 1977, the railway purchased four RAm/DE train sets retired from the Trans Europ Express by the Dutch and Swiss railways, for use on its Northlander train. However, the experiment was not entirely successful. The locomotives were scrapped in 1984, although the passenger cars survived until the early 1990s. These surviving passenger cars were pulled by rebuilt Canadian locomotives (EMD FP7). The rear end of the locomotives was altered to fit to original cars. With the Canadian locomotives, the control car / DVT lost their function.

Many passenger cars used on ONR trains today are former single-level GO Transit cars that were extensively refurbished after being used for commuter service around Toronto.

In 2004, Ontario Northland purchased ten passenger cars, including dome cars, from BC Rail and has used some of them on the Polar Bear Express service between Cochrane and Moosonee.

- Highball steam engine – ex-Temiskaming & Northern Ontario No. 119 (later as 219) built in 1907 and Normetal 1938, then acquired by ONR in 1975 and sold to Northern Ontario Railway Museum
- 4-6-2 steam engine (No. 701) – stored in Englehart
- Electro-Motive Diesel (EMD) F7B
- General Motors Diesel (GMD) FP7
- GMD GP9
- GMD GP38-2
- GMD GP40-2
- GMD SD40-2
- GMD SD75I
- EMD SD70M
- EMD EMD SD70 MACe
- EMD F40PH converted to Auxiliary Power Control Units (APCU)
- Siemens SC-42
- Montreal Locomotive Works
  - MLW RS-10
  - MLW RS-2
  - MLW RS-3
  - MLW S-4
  - MLW S-2
  - American Locomotive Company (Alco) RS-2
- Hawker Siddeley Canada RTC-85SP/D corrugated coach – single deck coach acquired from GO Transit
- PM-class coach
- Budd dome coach
- Budd lounge car
- Budd lunch counter car
- Werkspoor/Schweizerische Industrie Gesellschaft TEE Trainset (No longer on roster, some cars have been shipped back to Europe, currently based in the Netherlands)
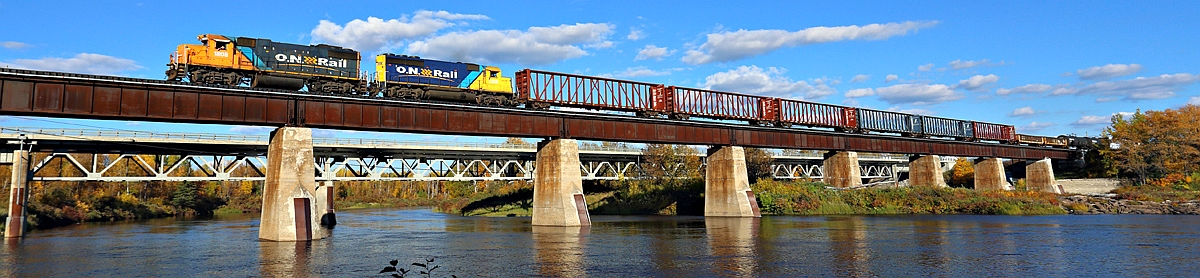
Crossing the Missinaibi River at Mattice-Val Côté

== Facilities ==
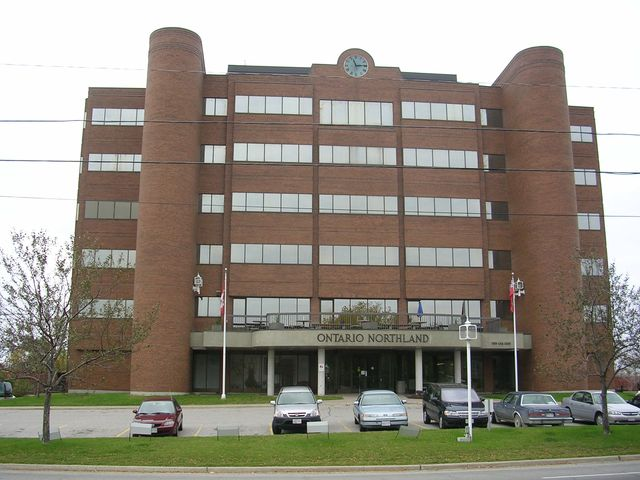
Ontario Northland building in North Bay

- North Bay Yard – on the west side of the ONR Head Office and stores most of the ONR's cars. Ontario Northland's Refurbishment Division at the yard was contracted by GO Transit to overhaul some bilevel cars.
- Cochrane Yard – a small yard located next to Cochrane station at 3rd Avenue and 2nd Street (not the larger one to the east). Also site of ONR Freight Services.
- Temagami Work Shed – located north of the Temagami Station (1907) to handle freight
- Moosonee Yard – small yard to store box/rail cars and diesel locomotives, diesel shed
- Hearst Yard – a small yard in the core of the city

== See also ==
- Ontario Northland Motor Coach Services
- Canadian National Railway
- Canadian Pacific Railway
- List of Ontario railways
- Rail transport in Ontario
