= Newmarket Subdivision =

Overview
- Status: Operational
- Owner: North section: Ontario Northland Railway; South section: Metrolinx
- Locale: Ontario, Canada

Service
- Type: Heavy rail
- Services: North section: Northlander; South section: Barrie line
- Operators: North section: Ontario Northland Railway (passenger), Canadian National Railway (freight); South section: GO Transit

Technical
- Track gauge: 1,435 mm (4 ft 8 1/2 in) standard gauge

The Newmarket Subdivision is a railway line in Ontario originally operated by Canadian National Railway (CN). The line historically ran north from Union Station in Toronto to North Bay.

In 1996, the section between Longford Mills (near Washago) and Barrie along the western shore of Lake Simcoe was abandoned and the tracks removed, severing the route. The southern portion of the subdivision from Barrie to the Union Station Rail Corridor in Toronto was sold to Metrolinx, which now operates it as the Barrie line commuter rail corridor.

The northern portion between Washago and North Bay remained in freight service under CN ownership until 2026, when it was acquired by Ontario Northland as part of the restoration of Northlander passenger rail service.

== History ==
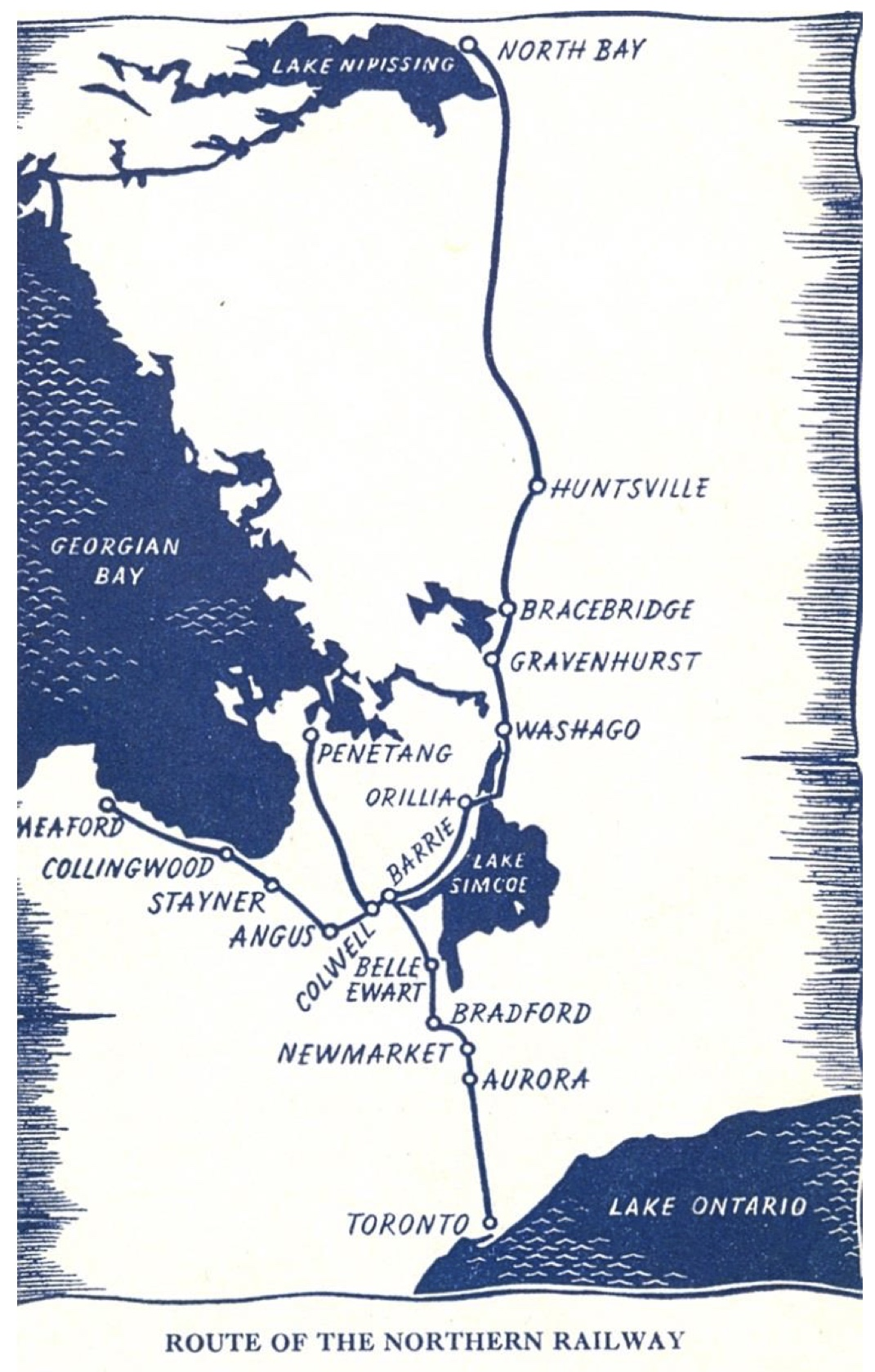
A map showing the Northern Railway of Canada at its maximum extent in the late 1800s. The Toronto–Barrie and Washago–North Bay sections remain in service.

The line originated as part of the Northern Railway of Canada, the first railway to begin commercial operation in what was then Upper Canada. The railway reached Allandale in 1853 before expanding northwest toward Collingwood and Meaford. Following the merger of the Northern Railway and the Hamilton and Northwestern Railway, a line was constructed northeast from Barrie through Orillia to North Bay, where it connected with the Canadian Pacific Railway transcontinental network.

The Northern Railway was acquired by the Grand Trunk Railway in 1888. Following the Grand Trunk's bankruptcy in 1918, the line became part of the newly formed Canadian National Railways in 1923. The northeastern route to North Bay became the Newmarket Subdivision, while the original route toward Meaford became the Meaford Subdivision.

CN continued operating both routes for several decades before beginning partial abandonments during the late 20th century. The Meaford Subdivision was sold in 1998 to the municipalities of Barrie and Collingwood and became the Barrie Collingwood Railway.

In 1996, the section between Barrie and Longford was abandoned and the tracks removed, ending rail service through Orillia. After the severance, The Canadian used the Newmarket Subdivision only as far as Snyder Junction north of Toronto before accessing the Bala Subdivision. The Northlander also shifted to the Bala Subdivision south of Washago.

That same year, CN applied to abandon the section between Snyder Junction and Barrie. The Ontario government subsequently purchased the corridor for use by GO Transit. CN retained ownership of the section between Snyder Junction and Union Station until it was transferred to Metrolinx in 2009.

On September 19, 2018, CN announced plans to discontinue the spur south of Washago to Longford Mills as part of its three-year network plan.

On March 13, 2026, the Government of Ontario announced that Ontario Northland had acquired the section of the Newmarket Subdivision between Washago and North Bay from CN. The CA$138 million transaction was completed on March 18, 2026, following an agreement reached in late February. The acquisition formed part of preparations for the restoration of Northlander passenger rail service between Toronto and northeastern Ontario.

== Passenger service ==
The subdivision historically hosted several passenger train services. Via Rail's transcontinental The Canadian operated north from Toronto to Washago, where it diverged onto the Bala Subdivision toward Sudbury.

Beginning in 1976, the Ontario Northland Railway operated the Northlander between Toronto and North Bay over the subdivision before continuing north to Cochrane on Ontario Northland trackage. South of North Bay, the train later operated entirely via the Bala Subdivision after the line was severed in 1996. The Northlander was discontinued in 2012.

GO Transit began commuter rail service on the southern portion of the line between Toronto and Bradford in 1982. Service was briefly extended to Barrie between 1990 and 1993 before returning permanently in 2007.

A short-lived Casino Rama Express excursion train operated in 1996 using GO Transit coaches but was discontinued because of low ridership.
