= Temagami station =

Railway station in Ontario, Canada

Temagami
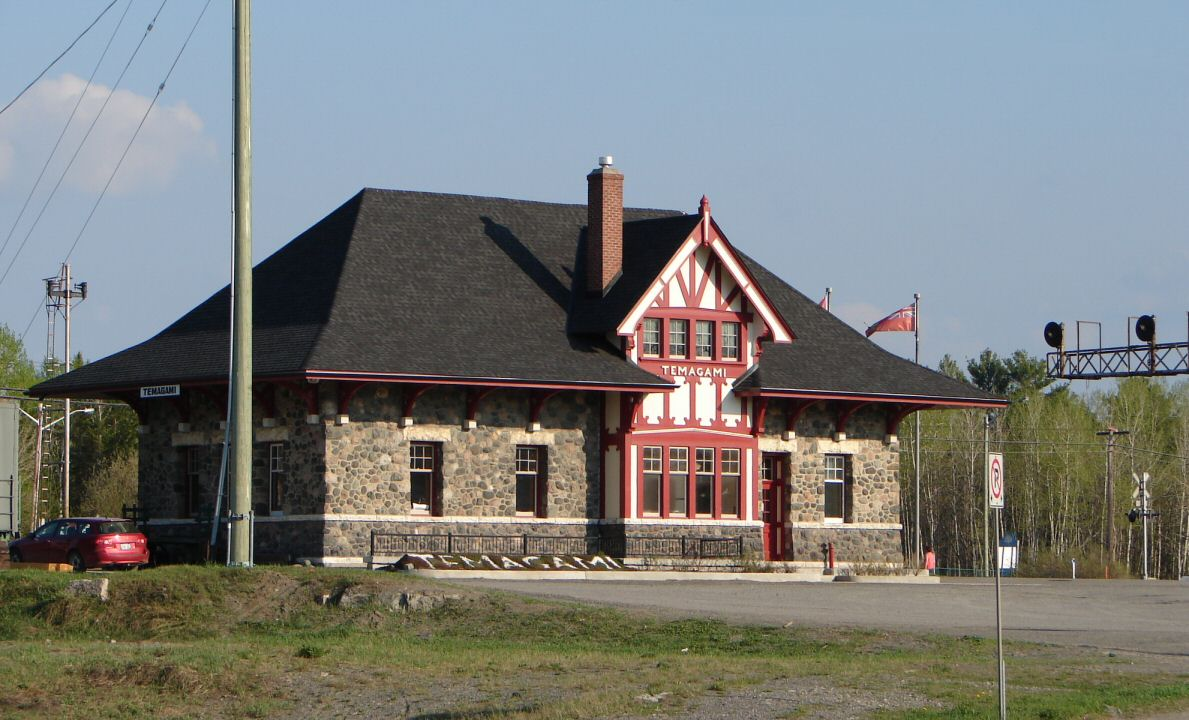

General information
- Location: 6718A Highway 11 North; Temagami, Ontario; Canada
- Coordinates: 47°03′49″N 79°47′20″W
- Owner: Ontario Northland Railway
- Line: Temagami Subdivision
- Tracks: 2

Construction
- Structure type: At-grade
- Parking: 5 spaces
- Accessible: Yes

History
- Opened: 1907
- Closed: 2012
- Rebuilt: 1909

Services
| Preceding station | Ontario Northland Railway | Following station |
|---|---|---|
| Temiskaming Shores toward Cochrane | Northlander (reopening Dec. 10, 2026) | North Bay toward Toronto |

Former services
| Preceding station | Ontario Northland Railway | Following station |
|---|---|---|
| Cobalt toward Cochrane | Northlander (1977–2012) | North Bay toward Toronto |
| Terminus | Dream Catcher Express (seasonal, pre-2012) | North Bay Terminus |
Location

Temagami station is a railway station in Temagami, Ontario, Canada. It was a railway station for service on the Northlander train.

== History ==
The station was built in 1907 by the then Temiskaming and Northern Ontario Railway (now the Ontario Northland Transportation Commission), but it burned down two years later and was subsequently rebuilt.

Circa 1907, the station could be reached from Toronto via Pullman coach equipped trains. The trains would leave Toronto in the evening and reach Temagami early the next morning.

The station housed the office, telegraph and signal equipment, ticket counters and washrooms, and two waiting rooms.

The station was altered in the 1940s and damaged by fire in 1976. In 1996 the current renovations took place. The station is now managed by Temagami Station Restoration Trust.

It was a stop for Northlander trains of Ontario Northland before service was discontinued in 2012, as well as seasonal Dream Catcher Express service.

In 2021 the Government of Ontario announced plans to restore service using Ontario Northland Railway from this station north to either Timminis or Cochrane by the mid-2020s.

In 2024, a contract was let to build a new enclosed shelter adjacent to the 1907 station to provide a waiting area for passengers.
