= Cobalt station =

Former railway station in Ontario, Canada

Cobalt
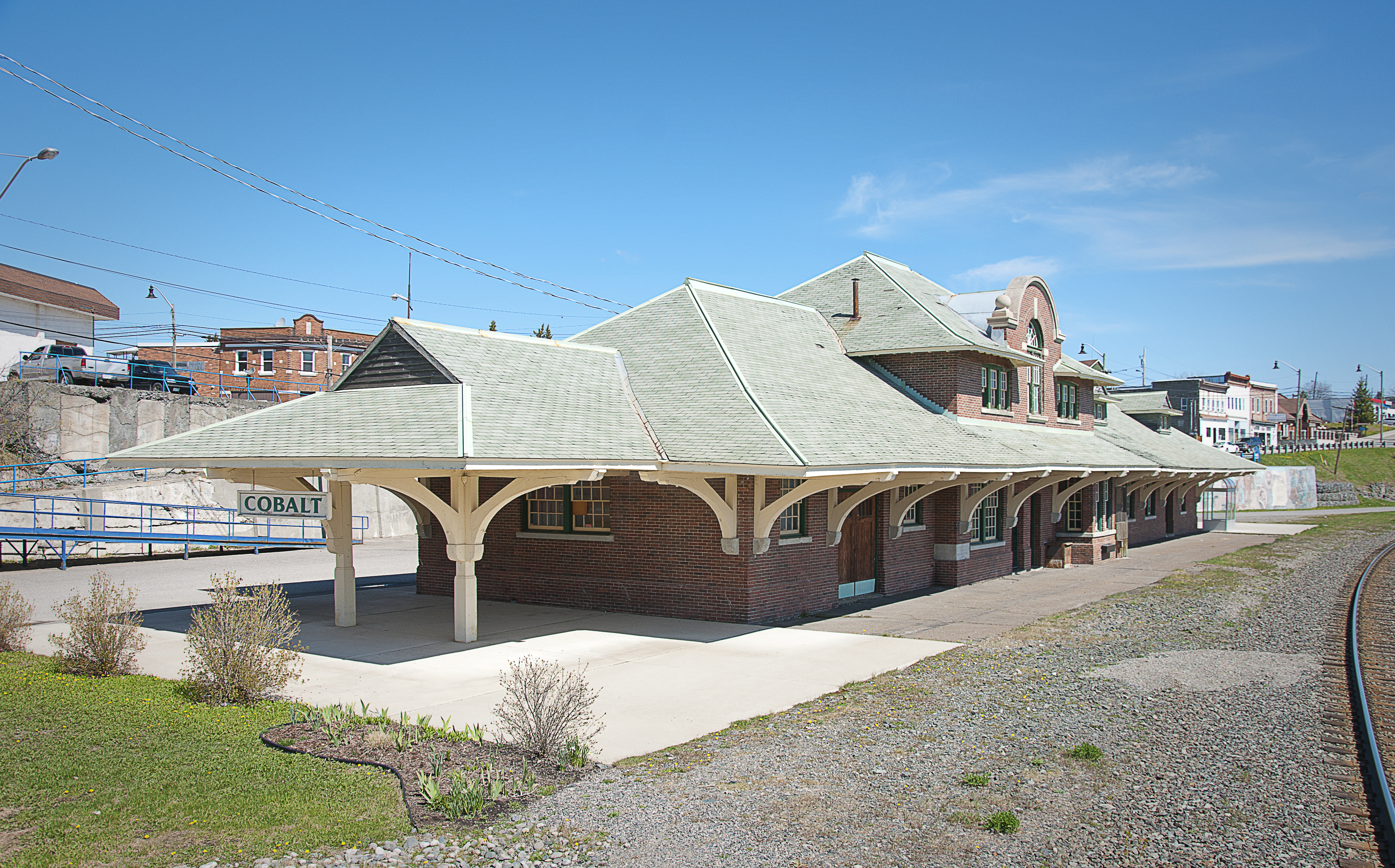
- The station in 2012.

General information
- Location: 22 Lang Street, Cobalt, Ontario
- Coordinates: 47°23′46″N 79°41′03″W
- Owner: Ontario Northland Railway
- Line: Temagami Subdivision

Construction
- Architect: John M. Lyle

History
- Opened: 1910
- Closed: 1983

Former services
Preceding station	Ontario Northland Railway	Following station
New Liskeard toward Cochrane	Northlander	Temagami toward Toronto

Ontario Heritage Act
- Official name: Cobalt O.N.R. Station
- Designated: 1983
- Reference no.: 10423
Location

Cobalt station is a former train station located in the town of Cobalt in Ontario. It was a stop for Ontario Northland Railway's Northlander passenger trains until that service was discontinued in 2012.

The station itself is occupied by the offices of the Historic Cobalt Corporation and the Bunker Military Museum; passengers had to wait outside to flag down the train and purchase tickets once aboard.

Cobalt was not included as a stop for the resumed Northlander service, expected to begin in the mid-2020s.

== Architecture ==
The station was designed by the prominent Canadian architect John M. Lyle and constructed in 1910 for the Timiskaming and Northern Ontario Railway. It is a long and low 1 1/2-storey brick structure, with an overhanging hipped roof which is gently curved. The roof contains pedimented dormers, with a central block Flemish gable that breaks the roofline and emphasizes the main entrance.

The dormers were to allow natural light to penetrate the waiting rooms. Waiting rooms were designed with exposed red brick walls, with several courses of dark brick to unify the large interior spaces horizontally. The interior features a wooden ceiling with massive timber roof trusses.

The Town of Cobalt designated the station under the Ontario Heritage Act in 1979 and the Ontario Heritage Trust secured a heritage easement on the building in 1993.

Passenger train service to this station ceased in September 2012, and was replaced by bus service between Cochrane and Toronto.
