= Timmins–Porcupine station =

Railway station in Ontario, Canada

Timmins–Porcupine

General information
- Location: Timmins, Ontario; Canada
- Coordinates: 48°29′41″N 81°09′36″W
- Owner: Ontario Northland Railway
- Line: Porcupine Branch
- Platforms: 1 side platform
- Tracks: 1
- Connections: Timmins Transit: 16

Construction
- Structure type: At-grade
- Parking: 9 spaces
- Accessible: Yes

Other information
- Status: Under construction

History
- Opening: December 10, 2026; 19 days' time

Services
Preceding station	Ontario Northland Railway	Following station
Cochrane Terminus	Northlander (reopening Dec. 10, 2026)	Matheson toward Toronto
Location

Timmins–Porcupine station is a railway station under construction in the Porcupine neighbourhood of Timmins, Ontario, Canada. The station is being built by the Ontario Northland Railway as part of the restoration of the Northlander passenger rail service between Cochrane and Toronto. The station is scheduled to open on December 10, 2026.

The station will serve Northlander passenger rail service, Ontario Northland Motor Coach Services, and Bus Parcel Express. Planned station facilities include a passenger waiting area, ticket counter, rail platform, motor coach bays, and accessible washrooms. Outdoor amenities are planned to include parking areas, pedestrian pathways, a taxi stand, a Timmins Transit bus stop, and passenger pickup and drop-off areas.

Construction work began in July 2025 as part of preparations for the restoration of Northlander service. The project is being completed in multiple phases. The first phase includes construction of the rail platform and parking facilities. The second phase includes construction of the station building. Construction was phased to allow the station to open even if the interior of the building is still being finished.

Ontario Northland's proposed Northlander schedule includes extended stops in Timmins before or after service to Cochrane station, described by the agency as "layovers". The schedule is intended to provide a timed transfer with the Polar Bear Express in Cochrane.
