= Temiskaming Shores station =

Former railway station in Ontario, Canada

Temiskaming Shores

General information
- Location: 13 Jaffray Street; New Liskeard, Ontario; Canada
- Coordinates: 47°30′32″N 79°41′10″W
- Owner: Ontario Northland Railway
- Line: Temagami Subdivision
- Tracks: 2

Construction
- Parking: 14 spaces
- Accessible: Yes

History
- Closed: 2012 (rail); March 4, 2016 (bus)
- Rebuilt: 2026
- Former names: New Liskeard (until 2012)

Services
Preceding station	Ontario Northland Railway	Following station
Englehart toward Cochrane	Northlander (reopening Dec. 10, 2026)	Temagami toward Toronto

Former service
Preceding station	Ontario Northland Railway	Following station
Englehart toward Cochrane	Northlander (1977–2012)	Cobalt toward Toronto
Location

Temiskaming Shores station (formerly New Liskeard station) is a planned passenger rail station in Temiskaming Shores, Ontario, Canada. It will be served in the future by the restored Northlander passenger train operated by the Ontario Northland Railway.

The site formerly had a station for the Northlander passenger train until service was discontinued in 2012. It continued operating as a bus station for Ontario Northland Motor Coach Services until its full closure on March 4, 2016. The original station building was demolished in 2023.

Ontario Northland plans to reopen the site as Temiskaming Shores station as part of the restoration of Northlander passenger rail service scheduled for December 10, 2026. A new enclosed passenger shelter is planned for construction between 2024 and 2026. The station will be one of nine enclosed shelters planned along the restored Northlander corridor.
