= Kirkland Lake station =

Demolished railway station in Ontario, Canada

Kirkland Lake
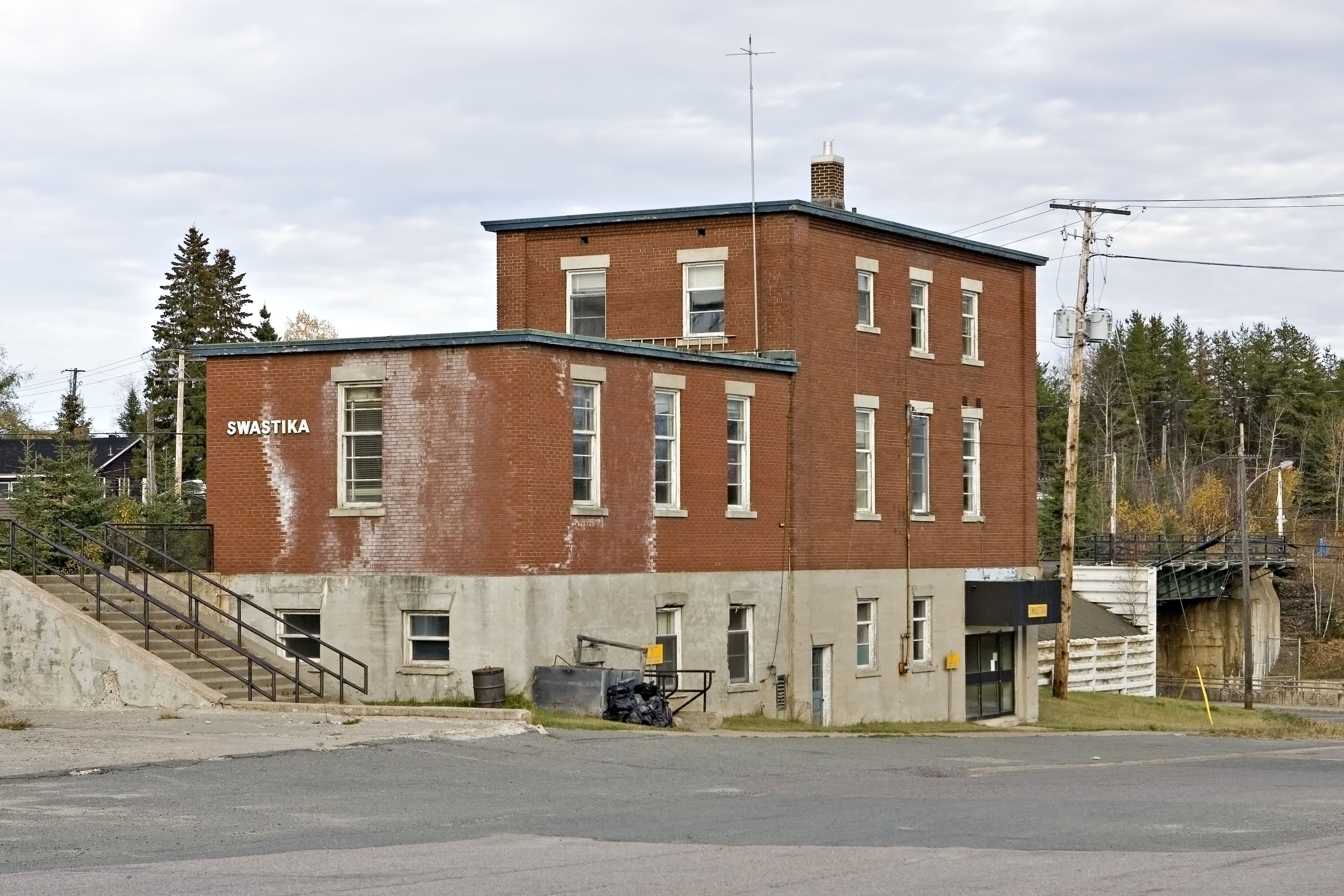
- Former Swastika station building, seen in 2006

General information
- Location: Highway 66 and Cameron Street; Swastika, Ontario; Canada
- Coordinates: 48.108146°N 80.104366°W
- Owner: Ontario Northland Railway
- Line: Ramore Subdivision
- Platforms: 1
- Tracks: 2

Construction
- Structure type: At-grade
- Parking: 6 spaces
- Accessible: Yes

History
- Opened: 1908
- Closed: 2012 (rail service); May 15, 2021 (station demolished)
- Rebuilt: 2026
- Former names: Swastika (1908‍–‍2021)

Services
Preceding station	Ontario Northland Railway	Following station
Matheson toward Cochrane	Northlander (reopening Dec. 10, 2026)	Englehart toward Toronto
Location

Kirkland Lake station (formerly Swastika station) is a passenger rail and motor coach stop in Swastika, Ontario, Canada, near Kirkland Lake. It is served by Ontario Northland Motor Coach Services and the future restored Northlander passenger train operated by the Ontario Northland Railway.

The original railway station was established in 1908 along the Temiskaming and Northern Ontario Railway, later the Ontario Northland Railway. Following the discontinuation of Northlander passenger rail service in 2012, the station building was demolished in 2021.

Ontario Northland plans to reopen the site as Kirkland Lake station as part of the restoration of Northlander passenger rail service scheduled for December 10, 2026. A new enclosed passenger shelter is planned for the site between 2024 and 2026. The facility will be one of nine enclosed shelters constructed along the restored Northlander corridor.

== History ==
Swastika station served as a stop for Ontario Northland Northlander passenger train for much of the 20th century. The station building included waiting areas, ticketing facilities, and washrooms. By the end of its operation, the station was unstaffed and only a small passenger waiting area remained in use.

After the cancellation of Northlander service in 2012, the station site continued to be served by Ontario Northland motor coach routes. Ontario Northland demolished the station building between March and May 2021. A historical plaque commemorating the former station was later installed at the site.

== Gallery ==
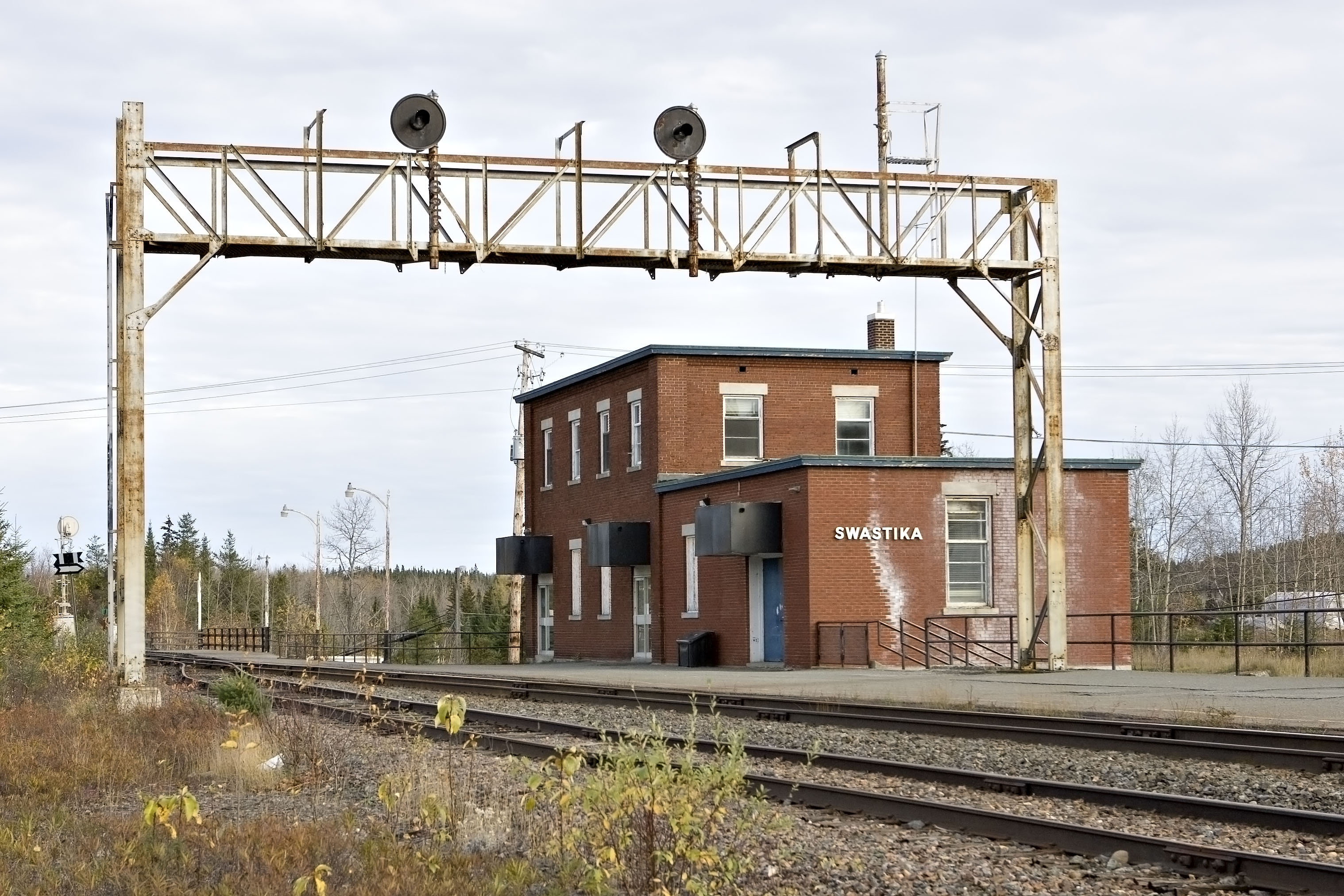
Swastika station from platform

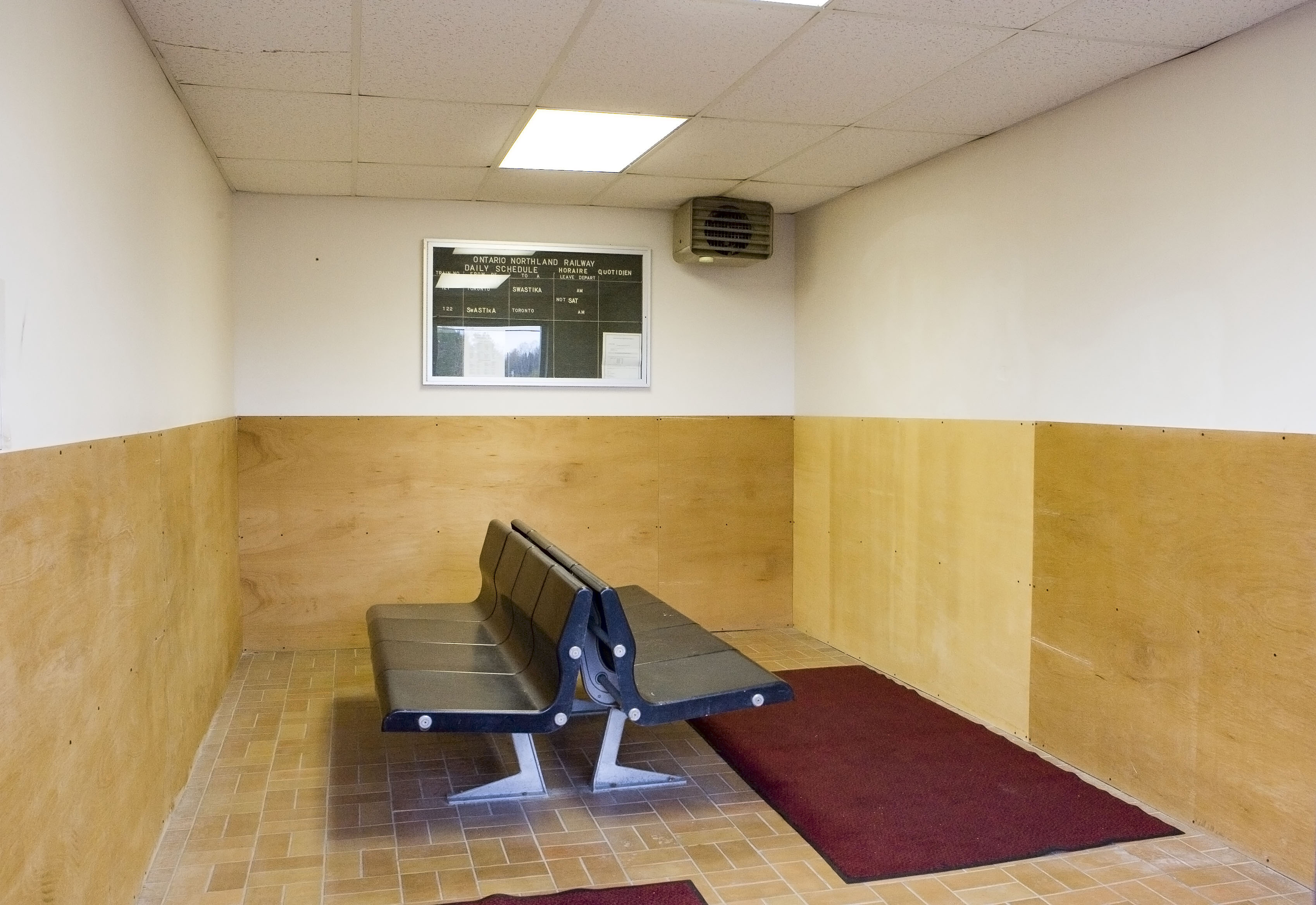
Swastika waiting room
