= Porcupine Branch =

Railway line in Canada

Overview
- Other name: Ramore Subdivision
- Owner: Ontario Northland Railway

History
- Opened: March 11, 1912

Technical
- Line length: 39 km (24 mi)
- Number of tracks: 1
- Track gauge: 1,435 mm (4 ft 8 1/2 in) standard gauge

The Porcupine Branch is a railway line in the province of Ontario, Canada. It runs 39 kilometres (24 mi) from a junction with the Ontario Northland Railway main line in Iroquois Falls to the Porcupine neighbourhood of Timmins. The line formerly continued west to the city core of Timmins. It is owned and operated by the Ontario Northland Railway.

The Ontario Northland Railway designates the Porcupine Branch as part of its Ramore Subdivision, which also includes the main line between Englehart and Porquis Junction in Iroquois Falls.

== History ==
The Temiskaming and Northern Ontario Railway's main line from North Bay, Ontario, reached Cochrane, Ontario, on November 30, 1908. Gold was discovered in nearby Porcupine, Ontario, in 1909, leading to the Porcupine Gold Rush and demand for better transport in the area. The T&NO began building west from Iroquois Falls on November 30, 1910. The line reached the Frederick House River in April 1911 and Timmins on March 11, 1912.

The branch hosted passenger trains such as the Northlander until 1989, when the branch was abandoned within Timmins. As of 2025, the Ontario Northland is building a new station on Highway 101 at the current end of the branch for the planned resumption of the Northlander in 2026.
