= Matheson station =

Railway station in Ontario, Canada

Matheson
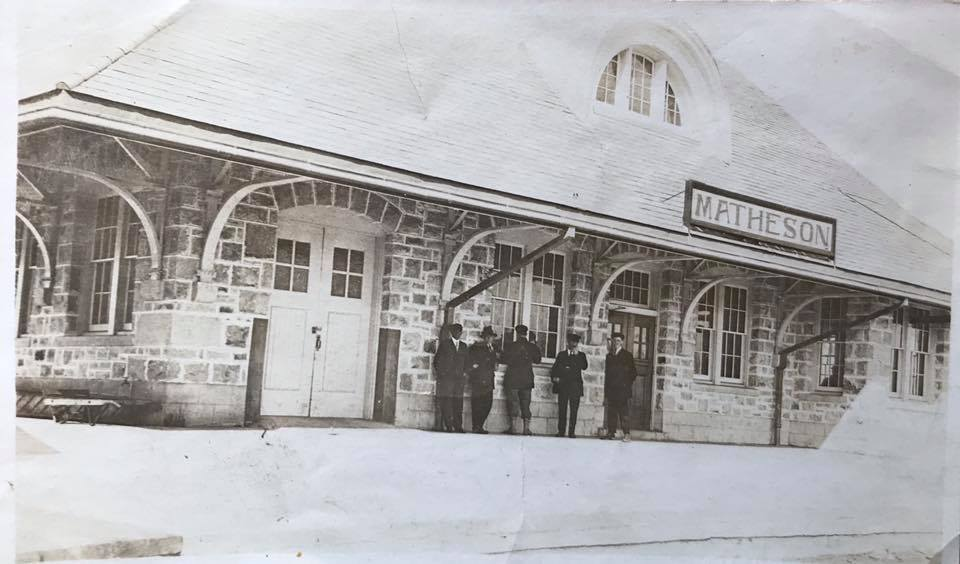
- The original station, taken before 1916.

General information
- Location: 385 Railway Street; Black River-Matheson, Ontario; Canada
- Coordinates: 48°32′03″N 80°27′56″W
- Owner: Ontario Northland Railway
- Line: Ramore Subdivision

Construction
- Structure type: At-grade
- Parking: 4 spaces
- Accessible: Yes

History
- Opened: c. 1908
- Closed: 2012
- Rebuilt: 1916, 2026

Services
Preceding station	Ontario Northland Railway	Following station
Timmins–Porcupine toward Cochrane	Northlander (reopening Dec. 10, 2026)	Kirkland Lake toward Toronto

Former services
Preceding station	Ontario Northland Railway	Following station
Cochrane Terminus	Northlander (1977–2012)	Swastika toward Toronto
Location

Matheson station is a railway station located in the township of Black River-Matheson in Ontario, Canada. It will be a stop on the restored Northlander service to Toronto when the service resumes on December 10, 2026.

== History ==
An original station was built on the line circa 1908 by the Temiskaming and Northern Ontario Railway; it was destroyed in the Matheson Fire in 1916. The present brick structure was built in its place in 1916. It still remains in place (as of 2020), well-maintained, unused and in good condition. The building contains a cornerstone indicating it was placed in 1916 by William Howard Hearst as Premier of Ontario, T.&N.O Railway Chairman Jacob Lewis Englehart, Denis Murphy and George Wise.

It was a stop for Northlander trains that are owned by Ontario Northland. The station was also a transfer point between the rail service and the Ontario Northland Motor Coach Services to Timmins, South Porcupine and Iroquois Falls.

In 2021 the Government of Ontario announced plans to restore service using ONR from this station north to either Timmins or Cochrane by the mid 2020s. The new station will be one of nine enclosed shelters to provide a waiting area of passengers.
