= Englehart station =

Railway station in Ontario, Canada

Englehart
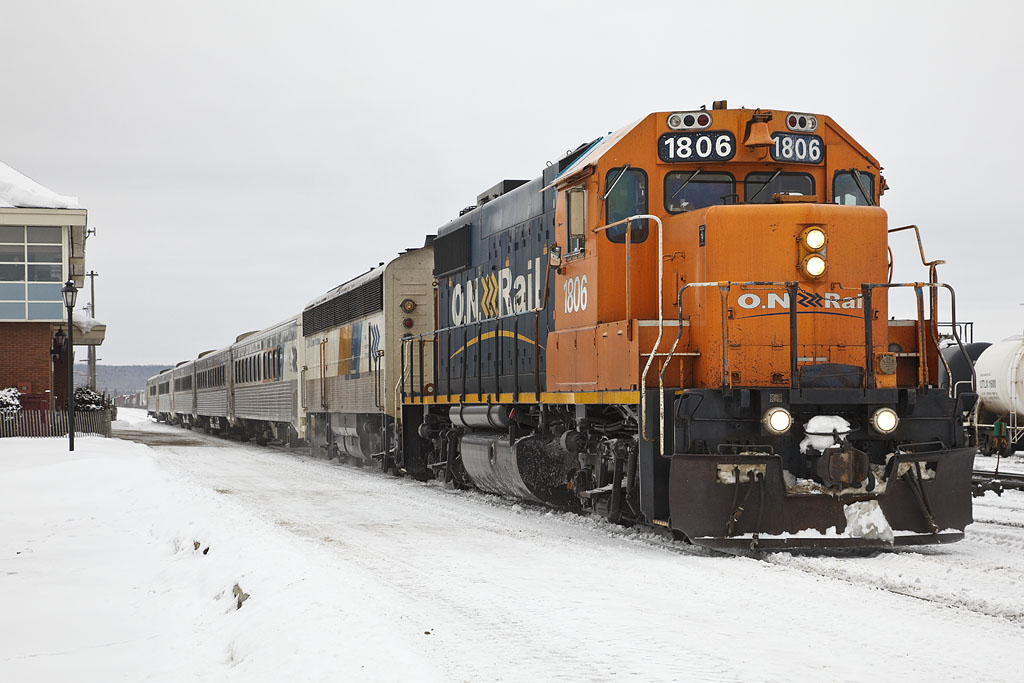
- Northlander leaves Englehart Station in 2008

General information
- Location: 3rd Street and 3rd Avenue; Englehart, Ontario; Canada
- Coordinates: 47°49′35.22″N 79°52′23″W
- Owner: Ontario Northland Railway
- Lines: Ramore Subdivision; Temagami Subdivision
- Platforms: 1 side platform
- Tracks: 11

Construction
- Structure type: At-grade
- Parking: 8 spaces
- Accessible: Yes

Services
Preceding station	Ontario Northland Railway	Following station
Kirkland Lake toward Cochrane	Northlander (reopening Dec. 10, 2026)	Temiskaming Shores toward Toronto

Former services
Preceding station	Ontario Northland Railway	Following station
Swastika toward Cochrane	Northlander (1977–2012)	New Liskeard toward Toronto
Location

Englehart station is a railway station in Englehart, Ontario, Canada. It served as a stop for Northlander trains operated by Ontario Northland until passenger service was discontinued in 2012. In 2021, the Government of Ontario announced plans to restore passenger rail service through Englehart. Service will resume on December 10, 2026.

The current two-storey station replaced an earlier station building. Englehart was the midpoint of the Ontario Northland Railway and served as a crew change point. The station also houses signalling operations for the northern portion of the line.

Ontario Northland maintains a rescue locomotive at Englehart for use in responding to stranded trains. Similar locomotives are also based in Cochrane and North Bay. The yard at Englehart includes 11 storage tracks and a machine shop for locomotive and rolling stock repairs.
