= Swastika, Ontario =

Community in Ontario, Canada

Swastika
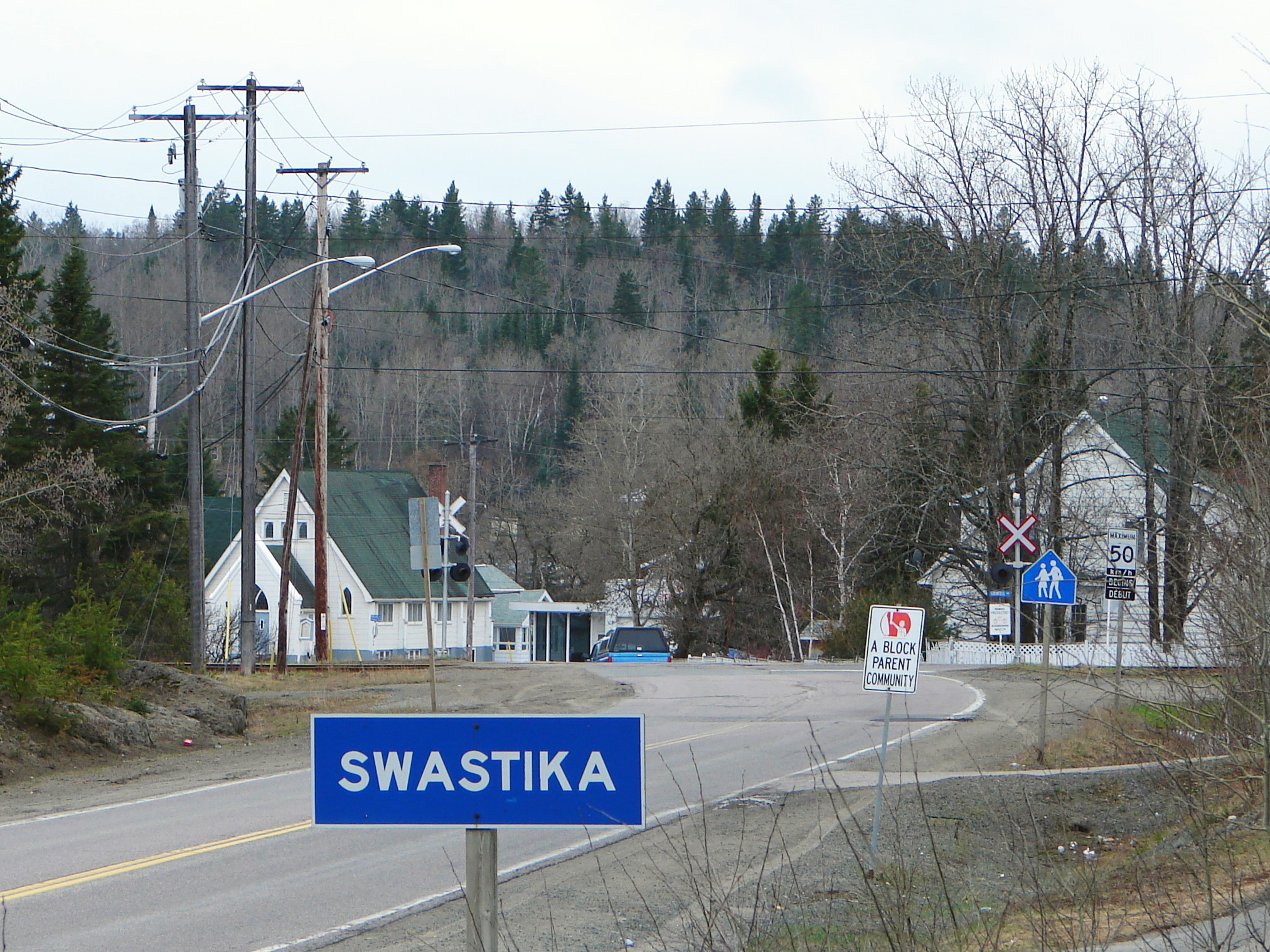

- Location within Ontario
- Coordinates: 48°06′28″N 80°09′16″W
- Country: Canada
- Province: Ontario
- District: Timiskaming
- Municipality: Kirkland Lake

Area
  - Land: 3.14 km^{2} (1.21 sq mi)
  - Water: 0.51 km^{2} (0.20 sq mi)
- Time zone: UTC-5 (EST)
  - Summer (DST): UTC-4 (EDT)
- Postal code: P0K 1T0
- Area code: 705

Swastika is a small Canadian community founded around a mine site in Northern Ontario in 1908. Today it is within the municipal boundaries of Kirkland Lake, Ontario. It has frequently been noted on lists of unusual place names.

Swastika is a junction on the Ontario Northland Railway, where a branch to Rouyn-Noranda, Quebec, leaves the ONR's main line from North Bay, Ontario, to Moosonee. Until 2012, the Northlander passenger railway service between Toronto and Cochrane served the Swastika railway station with a connecting bus service running along Highway 66 into downtown Kirkland Lake.

== History ==
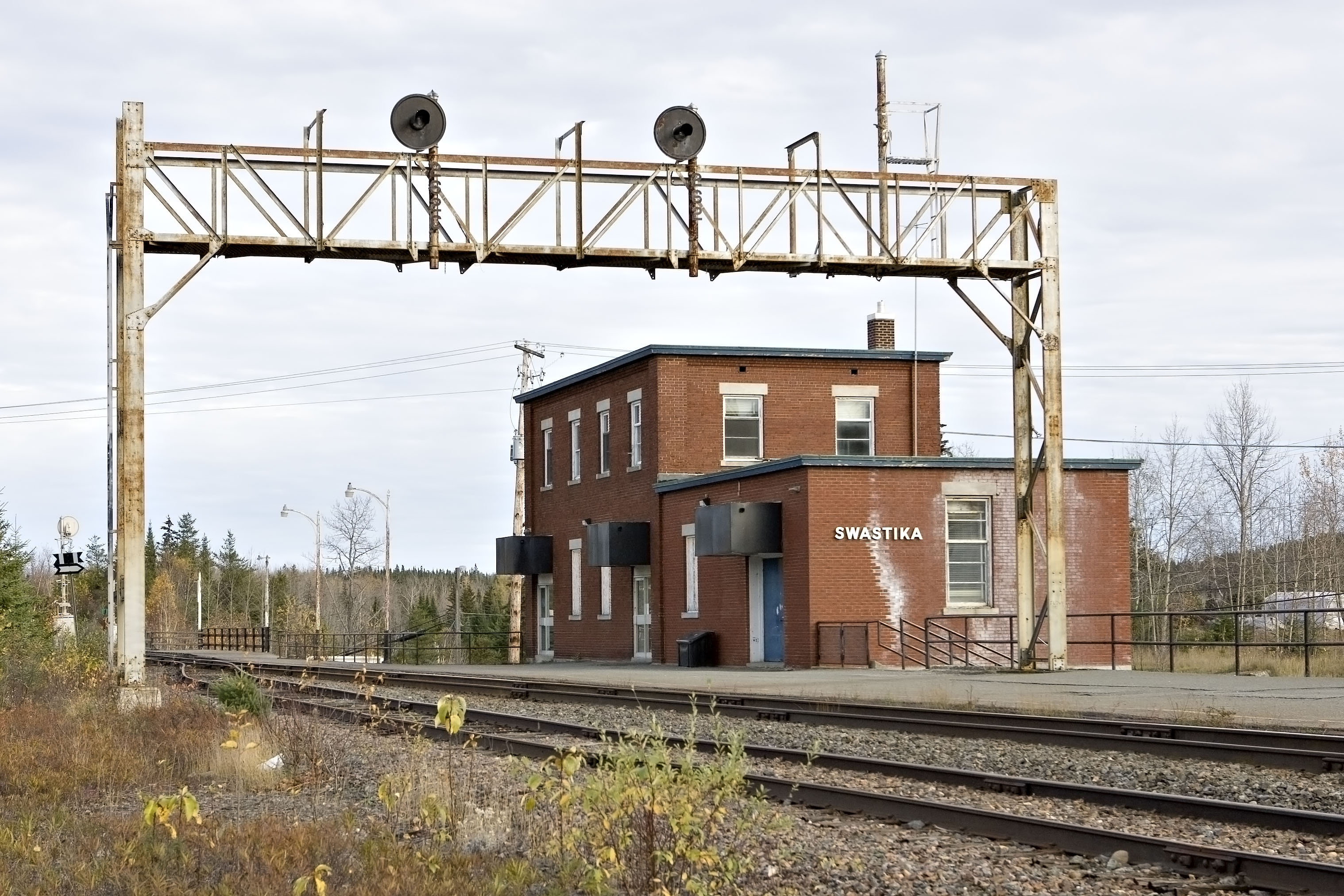
Train station in Swastika, Ontario

The town was named after the Swastika Gold Mine staked in 1907 and incorporated on January 6, 1908, the naming of the mine being inspired by a swastika necklace the owner saw.

James and William Dusty staked the claims alongside Otto Lake for the Tavistock Mining Partnership. The gold mine and town were named after the Sanskrit good-luck symbol swastika. The Temiskaming and Northern Ontario Railway had an engineers' camp nearby as they had to construct two railway bridges as they advanced northwards. The first usage of the name Swastika occurred in their 1907 Annual Report to indicate a water tank located at the site to meet the needs of the steam trains that opened up northern Ontario.

Prospectors and miners flocked to the area and after viewing the find at the Swastika Gold Mine they advanced even further throughout the surrounding region. In 1909 the Lucky Cross Mine adjacent to the Temiskaming and Northern Ontario Railway tracks began producing gold. A Mr. Morrisson started a farm and lodging alongside the tracks as early as 1907 and from there the community developed.

Swastika had a population of 450 by 1911, with the Lucky Cross and Swastika Mines in operation. By 1911, a hotel and businesses were flourishing, the area to the east was heavily staked and in 1912 the major gold mines of Kirkland Lake were found and developed by Harry Oakes. Swastika was the main transportation link with the railway and communications centre. Churches, schools, community groups and organisations continued to provide the needs of the residents of the area.

From 1945 to 1949, Swastika Mine was called the Crescent Kirkland Mine.

During World War II, the provincial government removed the Swastika sign and replaced it with a sign renaming the town "Winston". Residents removed the Winston sign and replaced it with a Swastika sign with the message "To hell with Hitler, we had the swastika first."
