= Moosonee station =

Railway station in Ontario, Canada

Moosonee
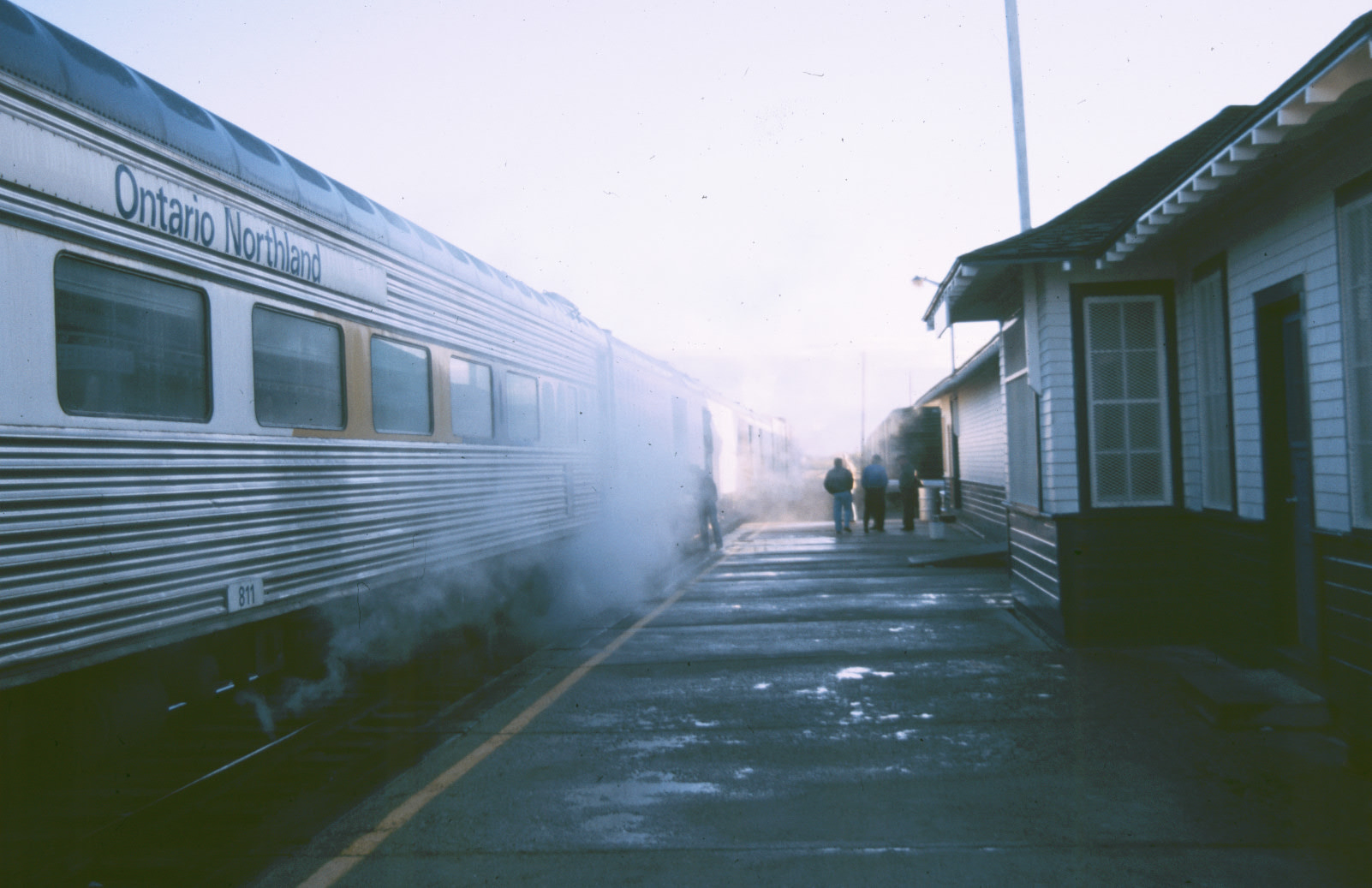

General information
- Location: 2 Railway Lane; Moosonee, Ontario; Canada
- Coordinates: 51.27612°N 80.64651°W
- System: Ontario Northland (inter-city rail)
- Owner: Ontario Northland Railway
- Line: Island Falls Subdivision
- Platforms: 1 side platform
- Tracks: 3

Construction
- Structure type: At-grade
- Parking: Yes

Other information
- Website: Moosonee station

History
- Opened: 1960s?
- Rebuilt: 2009

Services
Preceding station	Ontario Northland Railway	Following station
Terminus	Polar Bear Express	Galeton toward Cochrane
Location
- Location within Ontario Location within Canada

Moosonee station is a railway station in Moosonee, Ontario, Canada operated by the Ontario Northland Railway. It is the northern terminus of Ontario Northland's Polar Bear Express, located about 12 miles (19 km) south of the shore of James Bay on the north bank of the Moose River. It consists of a single storey station building, sheds, and a small train yard.

The station is located on Arena Road, which marks the northern boundary of the townsite. Directly southeast of the station lie the Moosonee Arena, Super 8 by Wyndham hotel, Moosonee Public School and the Moosonee Campus of Northern College.

As of April 2021, the train operates four days per week, with an afternoon arrival and early evening departure on Monday, Tuesday, Thursday, and Friday.

Moosonee is a base for cargo shipping to settlements not already served by the railroad. Tracks run past the station out to the Moosonee Airport with a siding along the Moose River (beside Revillon Road North) for bringing freight to barges. Box cars are stored at the terminus until trains run south for the return trip to North Bay or Toronto.

The station was built in the 1960s and renovated with new sidings in 2009. The first station in Moosonee was built in 1932 by the then Temiskaming and Northern Ontario Railway.

== See also ==
- Moosonee Airport (IATA: YMO, ICAO: CYMO)
- Moosonee Water Aerodrome (TC LID: CNB7)
