= Sudbury Ontario Northland Bus Terminal =

Sudbury ONTC Bus Terminal

General information
- Location: 1663 The Kingsway; Sudbury, Ontario; Canada
- Coordinates: 46.504225°N 80.937892°W
- Bus routes: See #Services
- Bus operators: Ontario Northland; FlixBus
- Connections: GOVA 12 23 103

Construction
- Structure type: Enclosed waiting area
- Parking: Adjacent surface parking lot

Other information
- Website: Sudbury
Location
- Location within Ontario

The Sudbury Ontario Northland Bus Terminal (also known as the Ontario Northland Bus Depot or ONTC Terminal) is a bus station and depot in Sudbury, Ontario, Canada. It is operated by the Ontario Northland Transportation Commission (ONTC) and is a stop on a number of Ontario Northland intercity bus routes. The terminal consists of a single-storey structure situated at the intersection between the Kingsway, a major east-west arterial road in Sudbury, 2nd Avenue North, which leads south toward the residential neighbourhood of Minnow Lake, and Falconbridge Road, which leads northeast toward Garson. It lies to the east of Downtown Sudbury, close to the Southeast Bypass.

== History ==
The site of the terminal was formerly a Saturn dealership, but it has been redeveloped and now features an indoor waiting area, washrooms, a ticket desk, and an attached bus freight depot where parcels can be loaded and unloaded.

Following the cancellation of many of its routes in Northern Ontario, Greyhound Canada announced in 2016 that it was closing its Sudbury bus terminal on Notre Dame Avenue and that existing Greyhound services would be relocated to the Ontario Northland terminal on the Kingsway.

Ontario Northland responded to the service gap created by Greyhound Canada's cuts by instituting a new Ottawa–Sudbury route (schedules 670 and 680) in 2017, which was later extended to Hearst, restoring the Hearst service which was cut in 2015.

In 2018, Ontario Northland announced a major service expansion west of Sudbury consisting of new routes servicing Sault Ste. Marie and Manitoulin Island, with Sudbury as the eastern terminus of both of these new routes. The service expansion increased passenger traffic at the terminal, with the new routes adding 15,000 new passenger trips in their first year to Ontario Northland, and making the Sudbury terminal a more important component in Northern Ontario's intercity transit network. Manitoulin Island service ended in 2019.

== Services ==
Ontario Northland routes which stop at the terminal include:

- Schedule 201-202 : Toronto – Barrie – Parry Sound – Sudbury
- Schedule 401-402 : Sudbury – Timmins – Hearst
- Schedule 501-502 : Sudbury – North Bay – Ottawa
- Schedule 503-504 : Sault Ste. Marie – Sudbury

FlixBus offers service to Parry Sound, Barrie, and Toronto.

Greyhound Canada services were suspended in 2020, and officially ended May 13, 2021.

== Connections ==
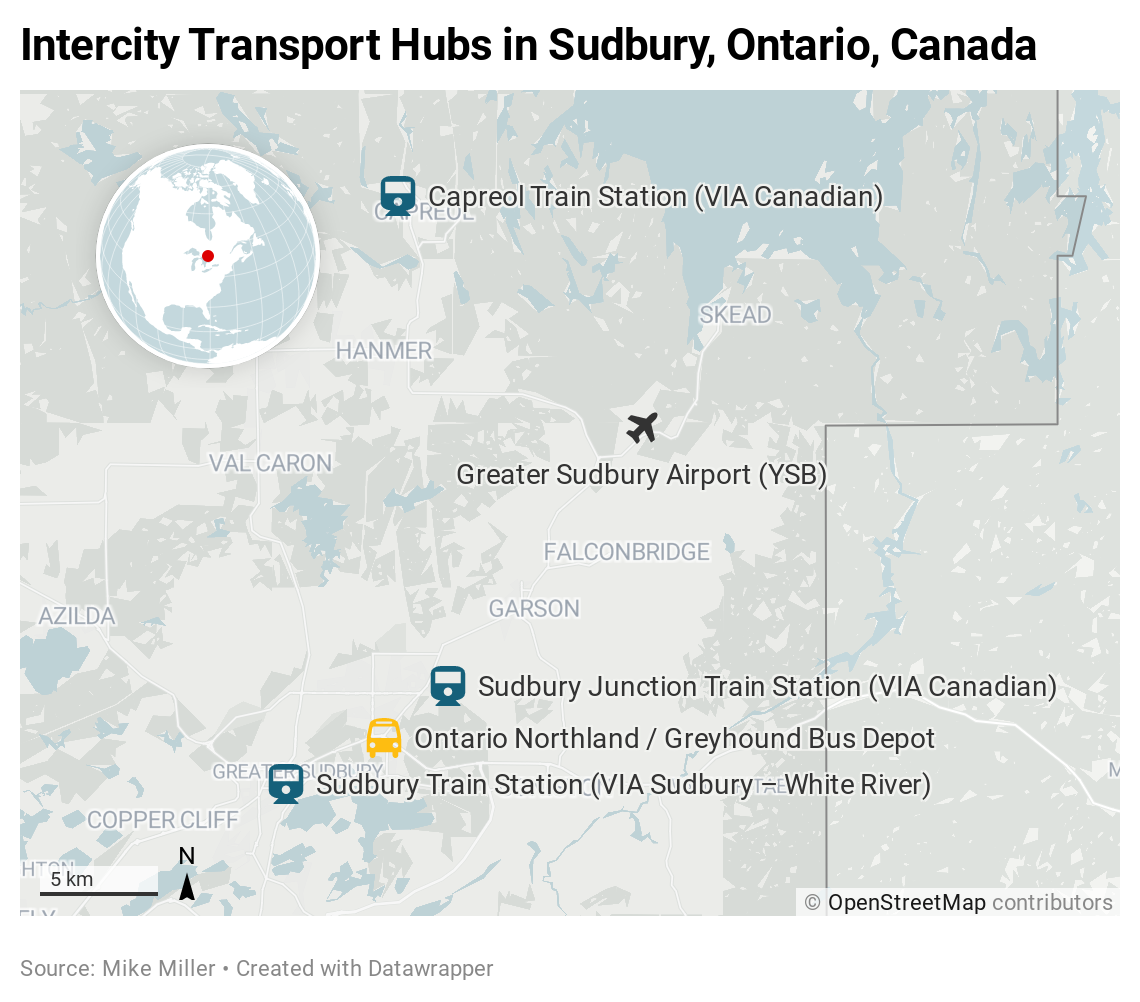
Intercity Transport Hubs in Sudbury, Ontario, Canada

GOVA connections are available using the on-street bus stops on 2nd Avenue North. Route 12 connects the station to the Downtown Transit Centre, the primary hub for local buses in Greater Sudbury.

The downtown Sudbury railway station is the other dedicated intercity transit hub in Sudbury, which serves as the eastern terminus of Via Rail's Sudbury–White River train, but is a considerable distance away and requires a bus or taxi connection.

Sudbury Junction station, which is served by Via Rail's transcontinental passenger railway service, the Canadian, is a moderate distance away, but is not served by GOVA buses. Capreol station at the north end of Greater Sudbury is the Canadian's next westbound stop after Sudbury Junction, and is served by GOVA buses.
