= Timmins Transit =

Public transport provider in Ontario, Canada

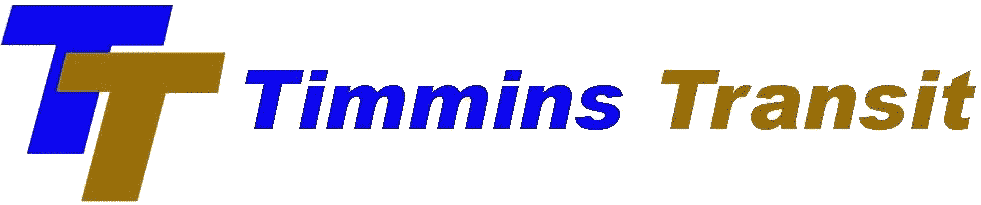
- Founded: 1976
- Headquarters: 220 Algonquin Blvd. East
- Locale: Timmins, Ontario
- Service area: Timmins, South Porcupine, Porcupine, Schumacher
- Service type: Bus service, Paratransit
- Stations: Timmins Transit Terminal
- Depots: 171 Iroquois Road, Timmins
- Operator: City of Timmins
- Website: Timmins Transit Online

Timmins Transit provides public transportation services to the City of Timmins in north eastern Ontario, Canada. The system is operated as a department of the City of Timmins, which also owns and operates the Timmins/Victor M. Power Airport. Over the past few years, after a decade of decline, Timmins Transit has experienced some of the fastest ridership growth in the country.

== Services ==
=== Scheduled routes ===
Most of the regularly scheduled routes, like many small cities, connect at the centrally located transit terminal transfer point.

==== Daytime & Saturday service ====
5 Westmount
9 Schumacher
16 South Porcupine/Porcupine
31 Howard/Brousseau
32 Lee/Rea South
36 Porcupine Community
37 Riverside-Melrose: service to The Home Depot via Riverside;return via Park Ave & Melrose
38 Melrose-Riverside: service to the Home Depot via Melrose and Park ave; return via Riverside

==== Evening & Sunday service ====
6 Riverside
7 Park Avenue
901 Porcupine East-West
902 Timmins North-South

=== Handy-Transit ===
Service is provided by fully accessible minibus for those with disabilities who cannot use the regular bus transit service. As a prerequisite clients must register and be approved to use this service.

== Facilities ==
=== Office and Garage ===
Address: 171 Iroquois Road, Timmins
Facilities: Administration offices, bus maintenance, body and paint shop and storage for the entire bus fleet
Coordinates: 48°27′32″N 81°19′44″W

=== Timmins Transit Terminal ===
This building, originally the T&NO Railway Station, also serves as Ontario Northland's intercity bus terminal.

Address: 54 Spruce Street South, Timmins
Facilities: waiting area, wicket, drivers' area, dispatching
Coordinates: 48°28′30″N 81°19′37″W

=== Schumacher ===
Address: 41 Father Costello Drive, Schumacher
Facilities: waiting area leased from Schumacher Bus Lines Ltd.
Coordinates: 48°28′35.5″N 81°18′00″W

=== South Porcupine ===
Address: 73 Main Street, South Porcupine
Facilities: small waiting area, at the Maurice Londry Community Centre
Coordinates: 48°28′42.5″N 81°12′36.3″W

== Fleet ==
More than half of the full sized buses and all of the minibuses are fully accessible vehicles. Over the next few years plans call for older vehicles to be replaced with accessible, low floor transit buses.

Several of the buses have been personalized by naming them, just like ship names.

- 34 - Spirit of Schumacher
- 74 - Spirit of South Porcupine
- 75 - Spirit of Victoria
- 79 - Spirit of Porcupine
- 80 - Spirit of Northern Ontario
- 82 - Spirit of St. Eustache
- 83 - Spirit of Guildford
- 84 - Spirit of North Bay
- 85 - Spirit of Timmins

== History ==
Commuter bus services in the Timmins area were operated by John Dalton from about 1926. Another early company, Hamilton and Dwyer, operated an hourly service from Timmins to Schumacher with a fleet of two buses.

The ancestry of those enterprises is carried on today under the banner of Schumacher Bus Lines Ltd, operating out of the Dwyer building on First Avenue, with school bus and bus charter services, and Dalton's Bus Line Ltd, on Dalton Road, providing similar services. Timmins, in 1975, was the last of Northern Ontario's five major cities to get public transit, which previously had been a privately run service partially funded by the city.

== See also ==
- Public transport in Canada
