= North Bay station =

Transit station in Ontario, Canada

North Bay

General information
- Location: 100 Station Road; North Bay, Ontario; Canada
- Coordinates: 46°18′50.6″N 79°26′19.6″W
- Owner: Ontario Northland Railway
- Line: Temagami Subdivision
- Bus operators: Ontario Northland; Autobus Maheux

Construction
- Structure type: At-grade
- Parking: 61 spaces
- Accessible: Yes

Other information
- Website: ontarionorthland.ca/en/station/north-bay

History
- Opened: 29 August 1990
- Rebuilt: 2026

Services
Preceding station	Ontario Northland Railway	Following station
Temagami toward Cochrane	Northlander (reopening Dec. 10, 2026)	South River toward Toronto

Former services
Preceding station	Ontario Northland Railway	Following station
Temagami Terminus	Dream Catcher Express (seasonal, pre-2012)	Terminus
Location
- Location within Ontario

North Bay station is a railway station and an inter-city bus station located in the city of North Bay, Ontario, Canada. The station is located east of downtown near the Trans-Canada Highway (Ontario Highways 11 & 17) and directly southeast of the Northgate Shopping Centre. It was designed and laid out as an intermodal station, serving both passenger trains and intercity buses; however, due to the suspension of the Ontario Northland Railway's Northlander and Dream Catcher Express rail services in 2012, it is currently active only as a bus terminal. Railway service is planned to return on December 10, 2026 with the revival of the Northlander.

The Ontario Northland Railway opened the station on 29 August 1990. Previously, its passengers trains used the Canadian National Railway's station on the Alderdale Subdivision, which required a backup move from the Ontario Northland main line.

Station amenities include an indoor waiting area, lockers, parcel shipping and receiving, ticket vending, and Wi-Fi. The outdoor bus platform features a covered waiting area and seating. As well, the Northgate Shopping Centre is situated across the railway tracks from the station and is accessible via a pedestrian tunnel.

== Services ==
=== Current ===
Intercity coaches
Bus Company	Destinations
Autobus Maheux	Rouyn-Noranda
Ontario Northland	Toronto Union, Toronto Yorkdale, Ottawa, Sudbury, Timmins

=== Former ===
The station was once a major component of the Ontario Northland Railway, being served by the Northlander and Dream Catcher Express intercity passenger trains. Both services were cancelled in 2012 and it is currently inactive as a passenger railway station.

== Connections ==
The station is served by North Bay Transit's route 8, in the westbound direction only. Connections to other North Bay Transit routes can be made at the nearby Northgate Shopping Centre, which is reached via an underground pedestrian tunnel from the station.

== See also ==
- North Bay/Jack Garland Airport - (IATA: YYB, ICAO: CYYB)
