= Ontera =

Canadian telecommunications company

- Formerly: O.N.Tel; O.N.Telcom
- Type: Subsidiary
- Industry: Telecommunications
- Founded: c. 1902
- Headquarters: North Bay, Ontario
- Services: DSL, wireless broadband, dial-up, landline, long-distance calling
- Owner: BCE Inc.
- Parent: Bell Canada
- Website: ontera.ca

Ontera is a telecommunications company in Ontario, Canada and a subsidiary of Bell Canada. It provides local telephone service in the Northern Ontario towns of Bear Island, Iroquois Falls, Marten River, Moosonee, Moose Factory and Temagami, and also offers long-distance services in most of area code 705.

== History ==
Ontera was founded as the Ontario Northland Telecommunications division of the Ontario Northland Transportation Commission, a Crown agency of the Government of Ontario, in 1902. It was the exclusive provider of long-distance calling services in many rural Northeastern Ontario markets until the Canadian Radio-television and Telecommunications Commission (CRTC) approved long-distance competition in 2000. The name was changed to O.N.Tel Inc. in the 1990s, then changed its trading name to O.N.Telcom in 2000, and then renamed to Ontera in 2004.

=== Divestment ===
In April 2014, the Ontario government announced it would sell Ontera to Bell Aliant. According to the Public Accounts of Ontario prepared by the provincial treasury board, the CA$6.3 million sale was made at a loss of $61 million.

The acquisition was completed in October 2014. Bell Canada, which had been the largest shareholder in Bell Aliant and most of its predecessors throughout their respective histories, took full ownership of Bell Aliant in late 2014.

Following its divestment, Ontera did not maintain investments in network infrastructure and stopped accepting new customers. The municipal council of Temagami approved a resolution in September 2020 to lobby the Canadian Radio-television and Telecommunications Commission to require Ontera upgrade its infrastructure and allow third-party resellers.

== Network Infrastructure ==
Ontera provides customer-premises LAN, VoIP and Internet security systems, DSL, fibre optic and wireless data services. The company owns and operates an extensive fibre optic telecommunications network throughout most of Northeastern Ontario.

In September 2008, Ontera announced plans to install a ring network, to strengthen network reliability, which was completed by spring 2009.
