= Ontario Northland =

Transportation agency in Ontario, Canada

Ontario Northland Transportation Commission

Agency overview
- Formed: 1902; 124 years ago (as the Temiskaming and Northern Ontario Railway Commission)
- Type: Crown agency
- Jurisdiction: Government of Ontario
- Headquarters: 555 Oak Street East North Bay, Ontario, Canada
- Minister responsible: Prabmeet Sarkaria, Minister of Transportation
- Agency executives: Alan Spacek, chair; Chad Evans, CEO
- Child agencies: Ontario Northland Railway; Ontario Northland Motor Coach Services
- Key document: Ontario Northland Transportation Commission Act (R.S.O. 1990, c. O.32)
- Website: ontarionorthland.ca

The Ontario Northland Transportation Commission (ONTC French: Commission de transport Ontario Northland), operating as Ontario Northland, is a Crown agency of the Government of Ontario continued under the Ontario Northland Transportation Commission Act. It is an agent of the Crown in right of Ontario responsible for providing and supporting transportation and related services in Northern Ontario and is accountable to the Legislative Assembly of Ontario through the Minister of Transportation.

Ontario Northland operates freight and passenger rail services, as well as motor coach services, in Northern Ontario. It previously operated an airline, NorOntair (closed in 1996), and a telecommunications subsidiary, Ontera (sold to Bell Aliant in 2014).

== History ==
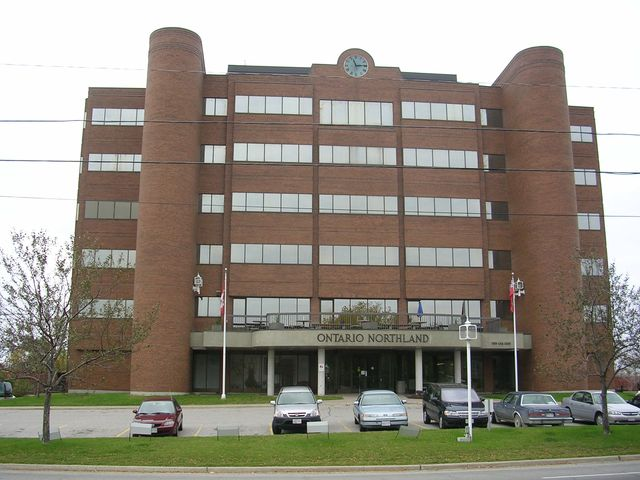
Ontario Northland headquarters in North Bay

=== Early history ===
ONTC traces its history to 1902 with the passage of the Temiskaming and Northern Ontario Railway Act, which received Royal Assent on March 17. The Temiskaming and Northern Ontario Railway Commission (TNORC) would oversee the construction and operation of the Temiskaming and Northern Ontario Railway (T&NO). The sod was turned less than two months later by Ontario's Commissioner of Public Works, the Honourable Francis Robert Latchford, at Trout Lake on the outskirts of North Bay; North Bay also being the site of the "first spike" driven in construction of the Canadian Pacific Railway (CPR) 20 years previous.

Building the 253 mile T&NO main line from North Bay to Cochrane was instrumental in opening this region of the province for development and settlement, with its construction being cited as the reason for the discovery of a massive silver deposit at Cobalt, as well as gold at Porcupine and Kirkland Lake.

Six years after construction started, the federal government's National Transcontinental Railway (NTR) main line from Winnipeg, Manitoba to Moncton, New Brunswick crossed the T&NO at Cochrane.

In subsequent years, the TNORC authorized extending the railway first into western Quebec's gold and copper fields at Rouyn-Noranda and, following World War I, in 1921, the TONRC began extending the T&NO northward from Cochrane to the shores of James Bay at Moosonee, where the T&NO "Last Spike" was driven by the Honourable Justice Francis Robert Latchford in 1932. The Commission also worked closely with sister provincial Crown agency, the Ontario Hydro-Electric Commission, in developing hydroelectric generating stations on rivers in the region, such as at Island Falls and Fraserdale.

=== New mandate ===
In 1937, the Temiskaming and Northern Ontario Railway Act was amended, enabling the TNORC to operate buses, trucks, and aircraft in order to transport passengers and freight. By 1938 the Commission had acquired 11 buses. In 1945, the Commission acquired the Temagami and the Nipissing Navigation Companies.

The railway changed its name in 1946 to the present Ontario Northland Transportation Commission. The use of the word "transportation" instead of "railway" in the commission's new name reflected an expanded mandate for the organization. Enabling legislation in 1950 allowed the ONTC to acquire, construct, and operate boats, as well as hotels, tourist resorts, and restaurants.

In the early 1960s it purchased a trucking firm, Star Transfer.

In 1974 ONTC acquired Owen Sound Transportation Company and their ferry operations. It was spun off in 2002 as a separate operational enterprise agency.

The railway is still operated today by the commission, which also operates other transport modes, including bus motor coach services along the Toronto-North Bay-Timmins-Hearst and Toronto-Sudbury-Timmins highway corridors. In 2016 Motor Coach started operating between Sudbury and Ottawa. In 2018, motor coach service was expanded between Manitoulin Island and Sudbury as well as a new Sudbury-Sault Ste. Marie-White River-Hearst route along Highway 17 (there is no service between White River and Hearst, according to the service map on 2023.10.08). It formerly operated a regional airline named NorOntair and a telecommunications company named Ontera.

=== Proposed divestment ===
On March 23, 2012, the Ontario Government announced that it would begin to wind down the ONTC, citing increased costs to the government and stagnant ridership. Passenger train service between Toronto and Cochrane (the Northlander) was terminated and replaced with additional bus service, and all assets of the corporation were to be sold off.

=== Plans to resume rail service ===
In May 2021, the provincial government announced plans for Ontario Northland and Metrolinx to write a business case to resume rail operations between Toronto and northeastern Ontario with a 13-stop route to begin service by the mid-2020s. The route would provide service from Toronto to Timmins or Cochrane and would be available between four and seven days a week, based on seasonal travel demands.

In December 2022, the Ontario Government announced a 139.5 million investment that marked a significant milestone in reinstating passenger service between Timmins and Toronto. The government news release mentioned that the three new train sets will be built by Siemens Mobility Limited and will meet the latest EPA Tier 4 diesel emission standards.

== Restructuring ==
Northern Ontario municipal leaders had continued to express their fears regarding the divestment. They indicated that the ONR provides a fundamental link to many remote and rural communities and provides freight transport to many companies, including mining and forestry, allowing them to thrive. They indicate that the government maintained its funding to the GO Transit network in Southern Ontario and it is important not forget about the important service the ONR provides to Northern Ontario residents. February 2014, the new premier of Ontario Kathleen Wynne met with northern community leaders and the head of the company and union to discuss the future of the company. They decided the union and management would present a reconstruction plan to the government for consideration.

In late February, 2014 a report to restructure the ONTC was delivered to the Minister of Northern Development and Mines. The proposal detailed how the organization could be modernized both culturally and in job reductions through attrition. The report was well received by the minister who appreciated how management and labour come together to explore options for the corporation.

In April 2014 the provincial government concluded the company would remain in public hands. However, the telecommunications division Ontera would be sold to Bell Aliant. The government would reinvest in the company to purchase new coaches and refurbish rolling stock for the Polar Bear Express. This decision was supported by other members of Provincial Parliament after the auditor general's review cited that it would have cost the taxpayer $820 million instead of saving $265.9 million over three years had the divestment proceeded.

== Transportation services ==
=== Rail ===
ONTC operates freight train service in Northern Ontario, as well as the Polar Bear Express passenger service. A passenger service, the Northlander, ended in 2012 but is expected to return in late 2026.

=== Bus ===
ONTC operates passenger bus service throughout Northern Ontario.

=== Air ===
Ontario Northland formerly operated scheduled air services to Northern Ontario under the name NorOntair from 1971 to 1996.

=== Marine ===
Operated ferry service under Owen Sound Transportation Company from 1974 to 2002.
