= Ontario Northland Motor Coach Services =

Intercity bus service in Ontario, Canada

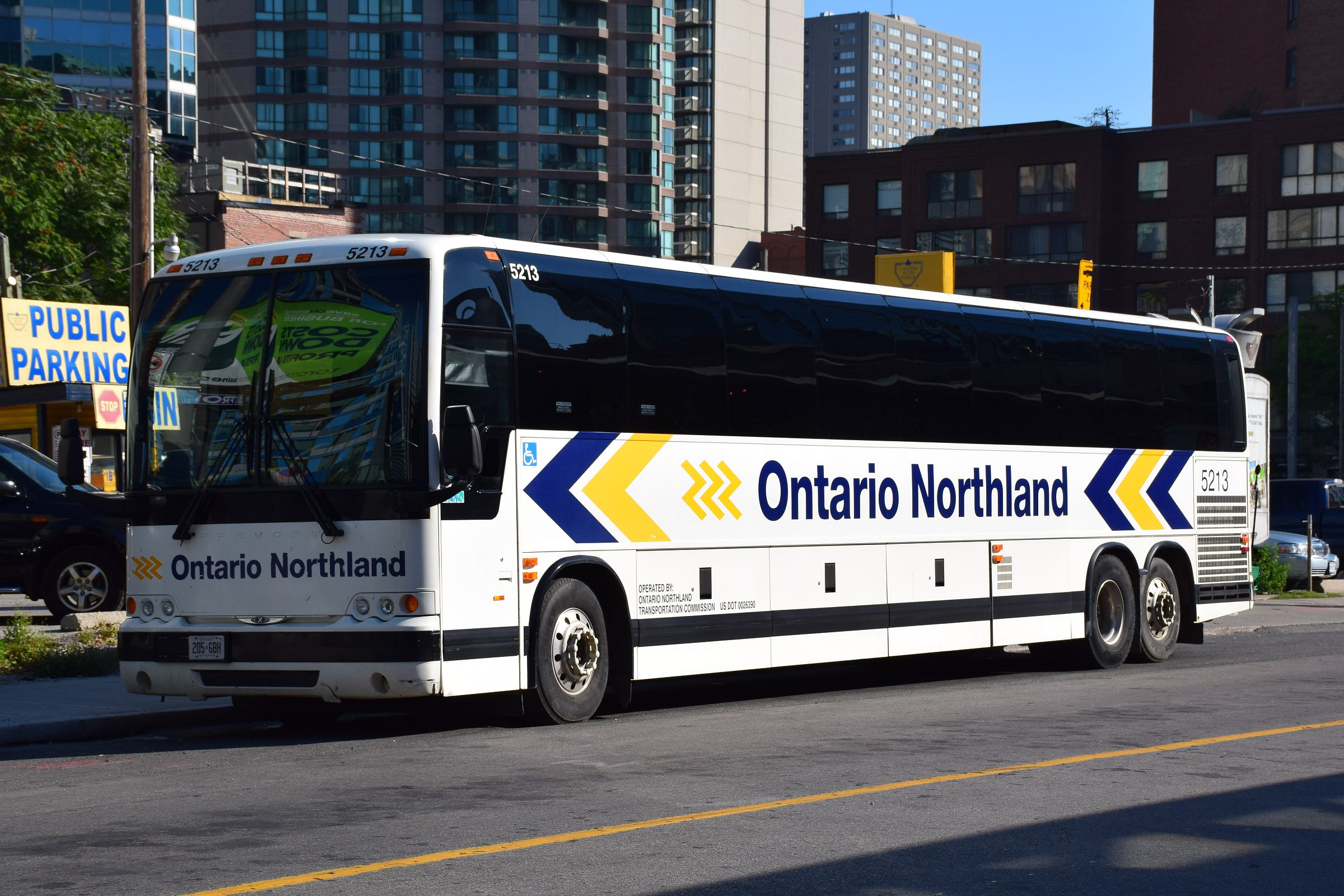
- An Ontario Northland bus at the Toronto Coach Terminal
- Parent: Ontario Northland
- Founded: 1937 (Temiskaming and Northern Ontario Railway bus operations)
- Headquarters: 555 Oak Street East, North Bay, Canada
- Locale: Ontario, Canada
- Service type: Scheduled coach service, bus charter and bus parcel express
- Routes: 8
- Hubs: North Bay, Cochrane
- Annual ridership: ▼306,335 (FY25)
- Website: ontarionorthland.ca/en/travel/travelling-bus

Ontario Northland Motor Coach Services is an intercity bus service operated by Ontario Northland, a Crown agency of the provincial government of Ontario, Canada. Ontario Northland Motor Coach Services operates passenger and parcel transportation service in northern Ontario, with additional routes connecting northern Ontario to the Greater Toronto Area, Winnipeg, and Ottawa.

== History ==
Coach service began in 1937 following the amendments to the Temiskaming and Northern Ontario Railway Act that allowed the then Temiskaming and Northern Ontario Railway to operate buses in Northern Ontario. There are two scheduled routes running north–south between Toronto and Hearst; the Highway 11 corridor, through North Bay and Cochrane, and the Highway 400/69/144 corridor, through Parry Sound, Sudbury and Timmins. There are also routes running east–west between Sudbury and Ottawa and between White River and North Bay.

The bus service was suspended when a drivers' strike began on September 29, 2007. The strike left the train as the only public transportation available for many communities; bus service did not resume until December 11, 2007.

=== Planned divestment ===
In 2012 the provincial government announced the divestment of the crown corporation citing it could no longer subsidize the money-losing operation. The government then cancelled the Northlander passenger train service from Toronto to Cochrane. Then premier Dalton McGuinty vowed to keep the coaches running after the Crown agency is sold off (the number of coaches in service has increased to compensate for the lack of the passenger train service) to continue to provide transit to remote Northern Ontario.

=== Restructuring ===
Northern Ontario municipal leaders had continued to express their fears regarding the divestment. They indicated that the ONR provides a fundamental link to many remote and rural communities and provides freight transport to many companies, including mining and forestry, allowing them to thrive. They indicate that the government maintained its funding to the GO Transit network in Southern Ontario and it is important not forget about the important service the ONR provides to Northern Ontario residents. February 2014, the new premier of Ontario Kathleen Wynne met with northern community leaders and the head of the company and union to discuss the future of the company. They decided the union and management would present a reconstruction plan to the government for consideration.

In late February 2014, a report to restructure the ONTC was delivered to the Minister of Northern Development and Mines. The proposal detailed how the organization could be modernized both culturally and in job reductions through attrition. The report was well received by the minister who appreciated how management and labour come together to explore options for the corporation.

In April 2014, the provincial government concluded the company would remain in public hands. However, Ontera (its telecommunication division) was sold off to Bell Aliant. The government reinvested in the company to purchase new coaches and refurbish rolling stock for the Polar Bear Express. This decision was supported by other members of Provincial Parliament after the auditor general's review cited that it would have cost the taxpayer $820 million instead of saving $265.9 million over three years had the divestment proceeded.

As per recent restructuring efforts, the ONTC closed the bus station in Englehart and Matheson which were replaced by an agency (as in other smaller locations) and with e-ticketing. New Liskeard, Kirkland Lake and Sudbury also had their hours reduced and will be closed on weekends (instead functioning as stops). The bus schedules themselves are not affected.

In January 2016, the ONTC announced a route running east–west, between Sudbury and Ottawa (Eastbound - Thursdays, Fridays and Sundays and Westbound - Fridays, Saturdays and Mondays). While historically serviced by Greyhound, that company recently reduced its service along this corridor with only a night bus remaining. In this case Ontario Northland has provided daytime service with a bus leaving Ottawa at 7 AM and from Sudbury at 2:05 PM. This marked the first time in the company's history that they have serviced Highway 17.

As of January 2018, new funding from the provincial government allowed for further expansion westward covering an additional 750 km and 20 communities West of Sudbury to White River.

Feasibility studies are underway to determine whether service expansion would include other communities currently not serviced, including Hornepayne and servicing a number of communities on Manitoulin Island. Based on these studies, Ontario Northland initiated weekday bus service to Manitoulin Island including 15 different stops.

As of June 2018, Ontario Northland initiated new service between Sault Ste. Marie and Hearst, via White River and Hornepayne. As of July 2018, Ontario Northland added 6 new hospital locations to the schedules.

Following the temporary suspension of operations by Kasper Transportation in northwestern Ontario in 2020 (due to Covid), Ontario Northland inaugurated a twice-weekly return service between Thunder Bay and Winnipeg.

== Routes ==
As of December 2025, Ontario Northland operates eight bus routes:

- Schedule 101/102: Toronto Union – Toronto Yorkdale – Vaughan Highway 407 – Barrie – North Bay
- Schedule 201/202: Toronto Union – Toronto Yorkdale – Vaughan Highway 407 –Barrie – Parry Sound – Sudbury
- Schedule 301/302: North Bay – Timmins – Cochrane
- Schedule 401/402: Sudbury – Timmins – Hearst
- Schedule 501/502: Ottawa – North Bay – Sudbury
- Schedule 503/504: Sudbury – Sault Ste. Marie
- Schedule 601/602: Thunder Bay – Sault Ste. Marie
- Schedule 603/604: Thunder Bay – Winnipeg

== See also ==
- Ontario Northland Railway
- Bus companies in Ontario
