= Cochrane station (Ontario) =

Railway station in Ontario, Canada

Cochrane
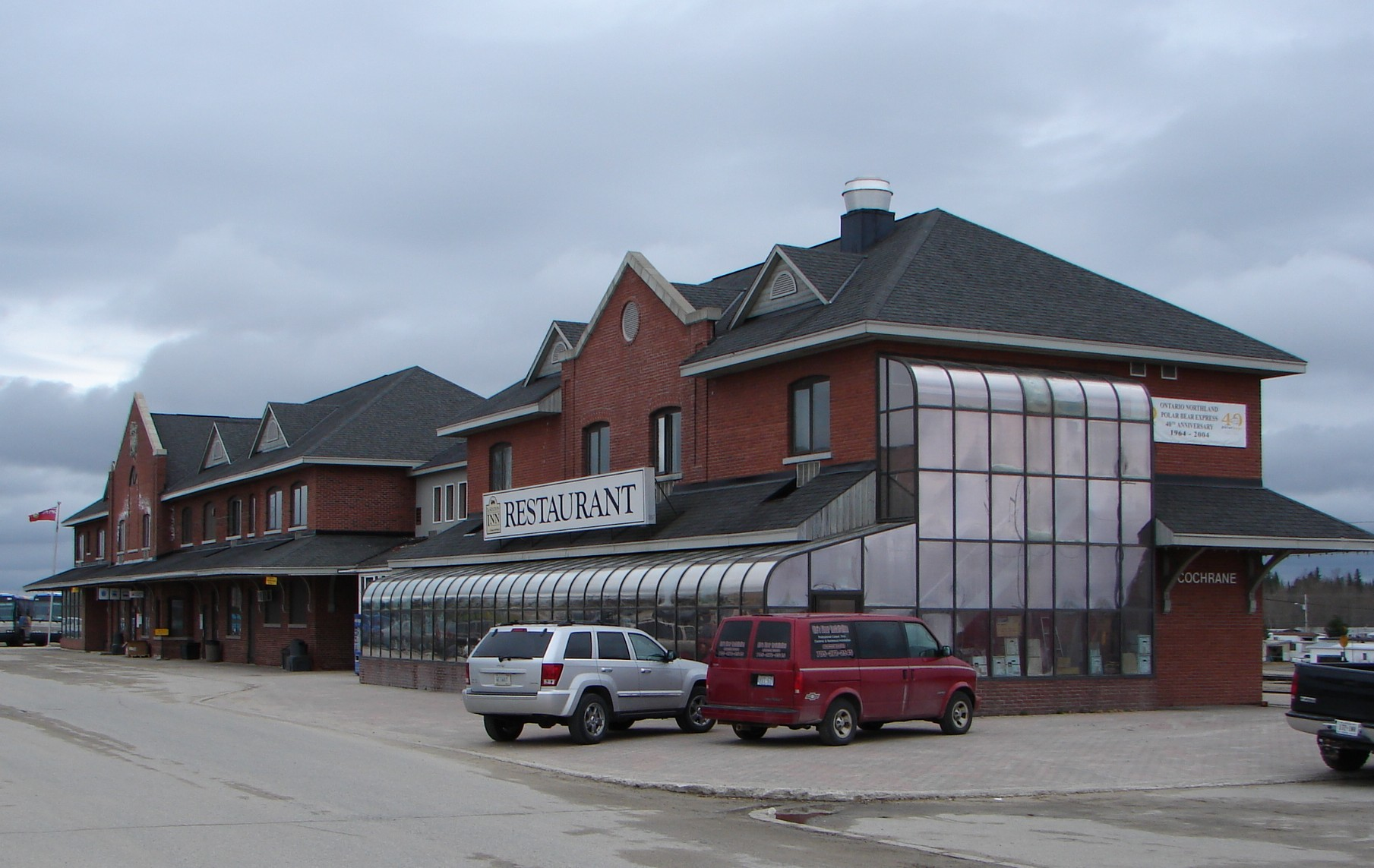
- Cochrane railway station

General information
- Location: 200 Railway Street; Cochrane, Ontario; Canada
- Coordinates: 49°3′38″N 81°1′24″W
- Owner: Ontario Northland Railway
- Lines: Devonshire Subdivision; Island Falls Subdivision
- Platforms: 1 side platform
- Connections: Ontario Northland

Construction
- Structure type: At-grade
- Parking: 33 spaces

Services
Preceding station	Ontario Northland Railway	Following station
Terminus	Northlander (reopening Dec. 10, 2026)	Timmins–Porcupine toward Toronto
Clute toward Moosonee	Polar Bear Express	Terminus
Former services
Preceding station	Ontario Northland Railway	Following station
Terminus	Northlander (1977–2012)	Matheson toward Toronto
Location
- Location within Ontario Location within Canada

Cochrane station is an inter-city railway and bus station located in the town of Cochrane, Ontario Canada operated by the Ontario Northland Railway (ONR). It is the southern terminus of the Polar Bear Express service to Moosonee (on the Moose River south of James Bay) and will be the northern terminus of the Northlander route. The station is located in downtown Cochrane, south of the intersection of Railway Street and 7th Avenue. Its main entrance faces north to Railway Street. South of the station building, trains call at a low level platform adjacent to the ONR Island Falls Subdivision.

== Railway services ==
As of April 2021, the Polar Bear Express operates four days per week, with a morning departure and evening arrival on Monday, Tuesday, Thursday, and Friday.

On September 28 2012, the Ontario Northland Railway operated the last Northlander train between Cochrane and Toronto, and replaced the route with a bus service.

The Ontario government has stated, however, that it intends to preserve the Polar Bear Express train service between Cochrane and Moosonee as an "essential service".

Service on the Northlander is expected to resume on December 10, 2026.

== Inter-city bus ==
Inter-city buses from Ontario Northland Motor Coach Services connect Cochrane station to a number of destinations in Northern Ontario such as Hearst, Timmins, North Bay and Sudbury.

Ontario Northland schedule as of 24 January 2021
Stop	Route	Destination / description	Notes
Cochrane station	101	to Hearst via Smooth Rock Falls, Moonbeam, and Kapuskasing	Sun, Tue, Thu westbound evening
Cochrane station	104	to Timmins via Timmins & District Hospital	Mon, Wed, Fri southbound morning; onward service to Sudbury and Toronto
Cochrane station	4B	to Matheson via Nellie Lake, Iroquois Falls, Porquis Junction and Val Gagné	Daily southbound morning; onward service to North Bay, Sudbury, Ottawa, and Toronto
Cochrane station	42	to Timmins	Daily southbound evening

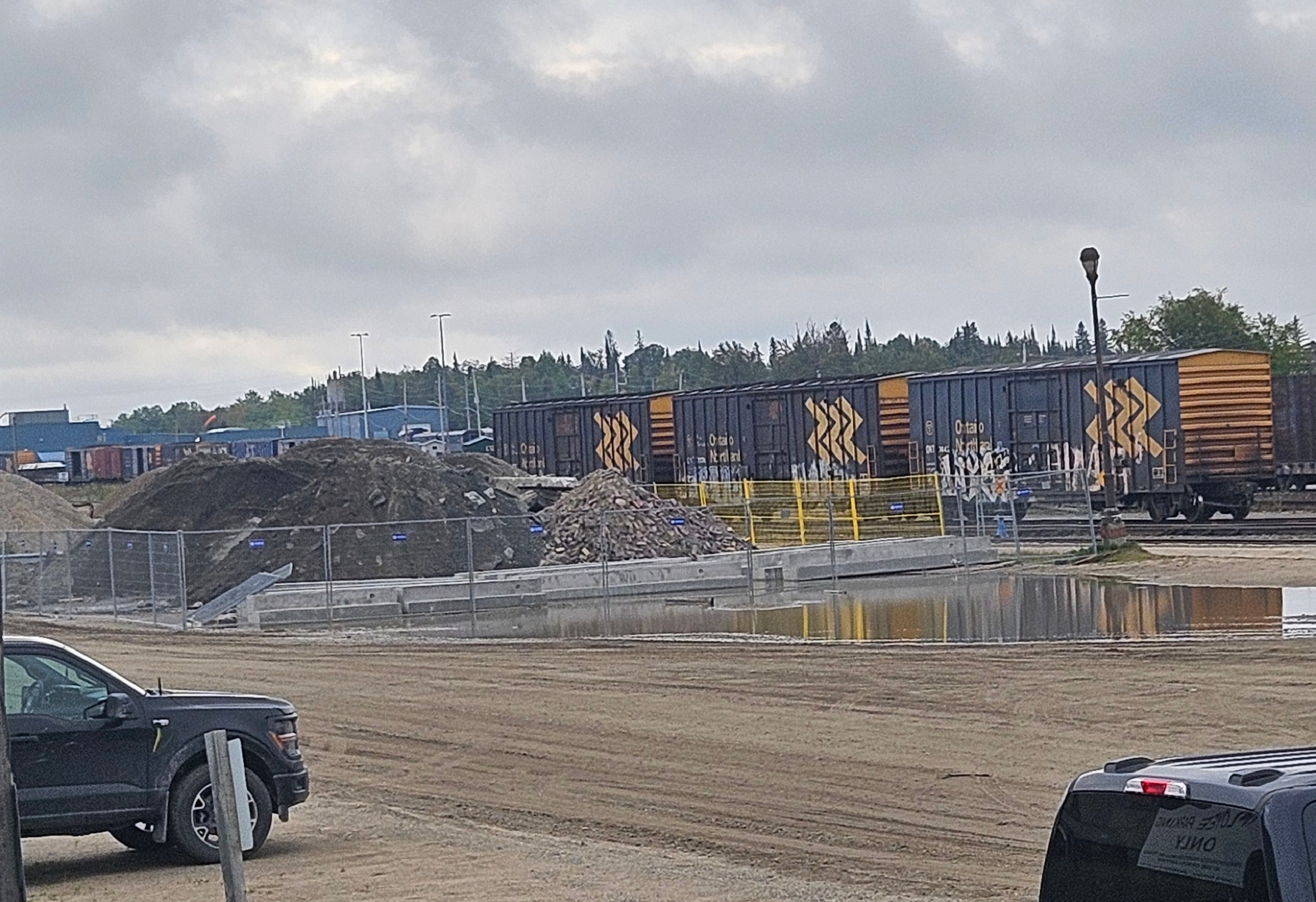
Ontario Northland train cars parked at Cochrane Yard (September 2025)

On the second floor of the station is the Station Inn Hotel (operated by Ontario Northland). The Cochrane Yard, a small train yard used to store trains for ONR is also located nearby.
