= Northlander =

Canadian passenger train in Northern Ontario

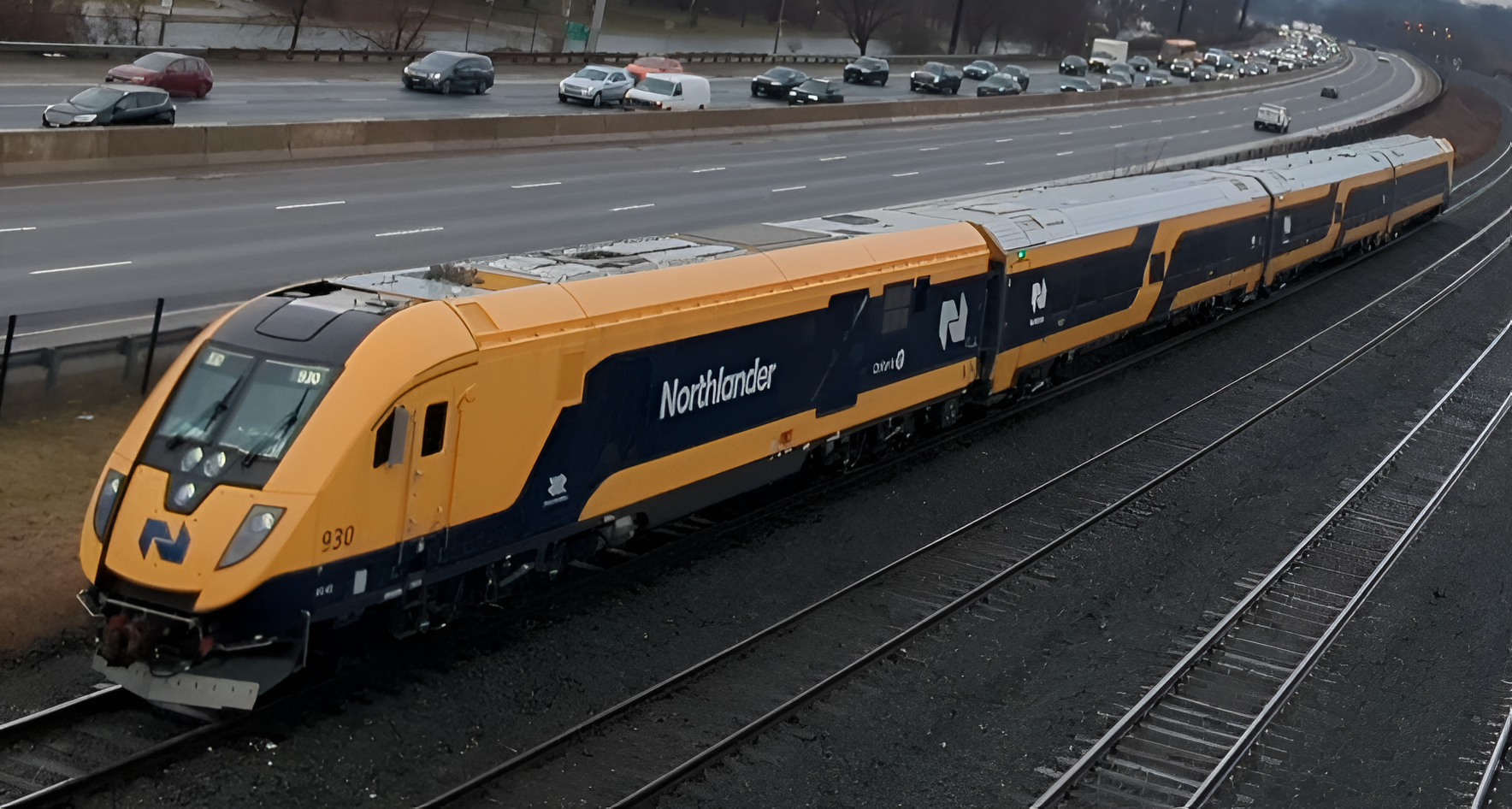
- Northlander Siemens Venture train travelling to Union Station in Toronto

Overview
- Service type: Inter-city rail
- Status: Under construction
- Locale: Ontario, Canada
- First service: Original: June 9, 1977; Restored: December 10, 2026; 17 days' time
- Last service: September 28, 2012
- Current operator: Ontario Northland Railway
- Annual ridership: 60,000 (projected, 2041)
- Website: ontarionorthland.ca/northlander

Route
- Termini: Toronto; Cochrane
- Stops: 16
- Distance travelled: 776 km (482 mi)
- Average journey time: 10 hr, 40 min
- Service frequency: 4 to 7 round trips per week

On-board services
- Disabled access: Fully accessible

Technical
- Rolling stock: Siemens Charger and Siemens Venture
- Track gauge: 1,435 mm (4 ft 8 1/2 in) standard gauge

The Northlander is a passenger train operated by the provincially owned Ontario Northland Railway in southern and northeastern Ontario, Canada. Service was discontinued in 2012, however the Northlander is scheduled to resume service on December 10, 2026 with an expanded route, modern trainsets, and upgrades to railway infrastructure and stations.

The restored service is planned to operate between four and seven days per week between Toronto Union Station and Timmins, with continuing service to Cochrane where passengers will be able to connect with Ontario Northland's Polar Bear Express service..

== History ==
=== Previous service ===
For 110 years until 2012, train service had operated from Northern Ontario to Toronto. In 1977, Ontario Northland Railway rebranded this service as the Northlander and ran it with secondhand rolling stock purchased from Europe. This daytime service initially complemented Canadian National's overnight Northland service. (Via Rail later took over CN's Northland and ran it until 1990 when there were major cuts to the Via Rail network including the Northland.) In 2012, the former provincial Liberal government of Dalton McGuinty shut down Northlander service. The main cause was a lack of ridership resulting in an average $400 per passenger subsidy to run the service. Four buses daily replaced the Northlander from Toronto to North Bay, but only two of them continued to Timmins and Cochrane. The service had operated on Ontario Northland tracks between Cochrane and North Bay, and on Canadian National tracks between North Bay and Toronto. Before its discontinuation in 2012, the Northlander operated six days per week year-round between Toronto and Cochrane.

In 1977, Ontario Northland acquired four secondhand trainsets of a European design. The four-unit trainsets were bidirectional, but the cab at the rear was rarely used due to safety concerns in the event of a collision. The diesel-electric locomotive had space for baggage. The train could seat 114 passengers, and had a dining car with eight tables and thirty-two chairs. Eventually, the locomotives for these trainsets (built in 1957) had to be replaced, and the trains would incorporate refurbished GO Transit commuter cars.

The previous Northlander made its last run from Cochrane to Toronto on Thursday September 27, 2012. The last return trip to Cochrane ran on Friday morning, September 28.

=== Revival of service ===
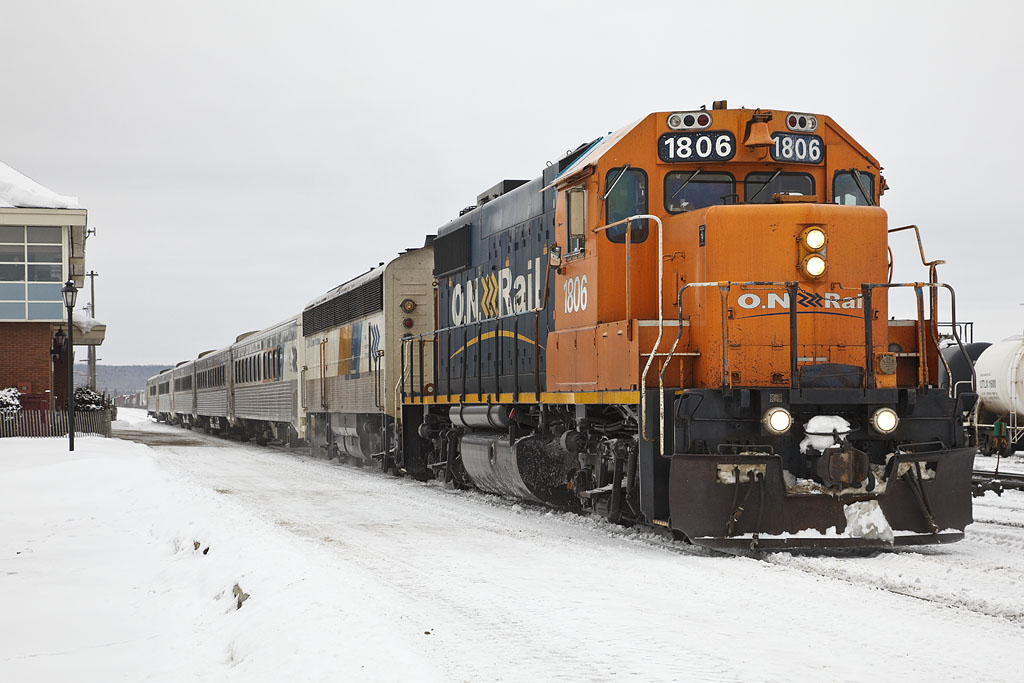
The former Northlander at Englehart station in 2008

Prior to the 2018 Ontario general election, Doug Ford promised to restore the service. Ontario Northland prepared a business plan and submitted it to the Ministry of Transportation of Ontario in late 2019, and the resumption of the service was mentioned in the province's Draft Transportation Plan for Northern Ontario published in December 2020, although no timeline was provided.

In May 2021, the provincial government announced plans for Ontario Northland and Metrolinx to resume rail operations between Toronto and northeastern Ontario with a 13-stop route to begin service by the mid-2020s. The route would provide service from Toronto to Timmins or Cochrane and would be available between four and seven days a week, based on seasonal travel demands. Two of the proposed stations, Gormley and Langstaff, are not ONR stations from the original Northlander route but they are serving GO Transit Richmond Hill line. Stations south of North Bay to Washago and south of Cochrane would need to be restored as they have either become inactive or adapted for other uses.

In April 2022, Ontario's Progressive Conservative government announced it had earmarked $75 million to restore the Northlander passenger rail service to northeastern Ontario. President and CEO of Ontario Northland Corina Moore said the money will be split over the next three years. She said it will look after passenger coaches, infrastructure and stations. The province said it continues to eye an in-service date of 2025. They said that the service will be offered on seasonal travel demands and will range from four and seven days a week between northern Ontario and Toronto.

On December 15, 2022, the Government of Ontario announced that it had purchased three trainsets from Siemens Mobility for use on the Northlander, each comprising a Charger locomotive, two Venture coaches, and a cab car operating in a push-pull configuration on trains between Toronto and Timmins.

By December 2023, further details became known. The trip from Toronto to Cochrane on the restored Northlander is expected take 10 hours and 40 minutes. Trains would leave Cochrane in the evening, and return in the evening or overnight. Stations along the route would be slightly different from the pre-2012 service; the 16 stops would be Union Station, Langstaff, Gormley, Washago, Gravenhurst, Bracebridge, Huntsville, South River, North Bay, Temagami, Temiskaming Shores, Englehart, Kirkland Lake/Swastika, Matheson, Timmins, and Cochrane. Cobalt was the only station from the original Northlander route that was not included as a new stop for the resumed service. Ridership by 2041 is expected to be 60,000 per year.

In 2024 and 2025, contracts were awarded for the design, manufacture, and installation of station shelters equipped with seating, lighting, heating, passenger information displays, security cameras, and intercom systems, as well as for platform reconstruction at multiple locations. These shelters will be used at the nine unstaffed stops: Matheson, Kirkland Lake, Temiskaming Shores, Temagami, South River, Huntsville, Bracebridge, Gravenhurst, and Washago.

In July 2025, construction began on a new staffed Timmins–Porcupine station. As part of the Northlander restoration project, the interiors of existing staffed North Bay, Englehart, and Cochrane stations are being renovated with digital passenger information displays, seating, and service counters. Additional upgrades include improvements to washrooms, lighting, and wayfinding systems.

Along the 776 kilometres (482 mi) corridor, infrastructure improvements are underway, including the installation of continuously welded rail, replacement of jointed track, realignment of curves to allow higher operating speeds, and upgrades to grade crossing warning systems. One major project is the North Bay Rail Bypass, a newly constructed 982 metres (3,222 ft) link between Canadian National's Newmarket Subdivision with Ontario Northland's Temagami Subdivision. The bypass is intended to allow future Northlander passenger trains to avoid travelling through Ontario Northland's yard and maintenance facilities in North Bay, reducing operational conflicts and shortening travel times by 15 minutes.

Ontario Northland began testing operations using the first new Siemens Venture trainset in April 2026. The testing program is intended to simulate normal operations and includes train testing and staff training. As of April 2026, two trainsets had been delivered, and the first trainset had travelled more than 1,600 kilometres (990 mi) during testing operations.

On November 19, 2026, the Ontario Minister of Transportation announced that Northlander service would resume on December 10, 2026. Initially, there would be four round-trips weekly.

== Stations ==
The Northlander is expected to serve 16 stations.

Ontario Northland's proposed schedule includes extended stops in Timmins before or after service to Cochrane, described by the agency as "layovers". The southbound trip from Cochrane is scheduled to include a one-hour layover in Timmins, while the northbound trip to Cochrane is scheduled to include a layover of 2 hours and 20 minutes. The schedule is intended to provide connections with the Polar Bear Express in Cochrane.

Ontario Northland also plans to operate an optional northbound express motor coach connection from Matheson to Cochrane for passengers whose final destination is Cochrane. The bus is scheduled to arrive approximately 2 hours and 45 minutes earlier than the train.

Station	Northbound (read up)	Southbound (read down)	Notes
Cochrane	8:30	22:15	Connection to Polar Bear Express to Moosonee
Timmins–Porcupine	7:30	23:15	Layover.
Timmins–Porcupine	5:10	0:15	Layover.
Matheson	4:15	1:10	Connection to express motor coach to Cochrane (northbound only)
Kirkland Lake	3:30	1:55	
Englehart	2:50	2:35	Rest stop.
Englehart	2:40	2:45	Rest stop.
Temiskaming Shores	2:10	3:15	
Temagami	1:10	4:15	
North Bay	23:40	5:45	Rest stop. Connections to Ontario Northland and other intercity bus operators.
North Bay	23:30	5:55	Rest stop. Connections to Ontario Northland and other intercity bus operators.
South River	22:25	7:00	
Huntsville	21:35	7:50	
Bracebridge	21:00	8:25	
Gravenhurst	20:45	8:40	
Washago	20:20	9:05	Connection to Via Rail's The Canadian
Gormley	19:20	10:05	Connection to GO Transit
Langstaff	19:05	10:20	Connection to GO Transit
Toronto Union Station	18:30	10:55	Connections to Via Rail, GO Transit, Amtrak, Toronto subway and Toronto streetcar

The Northlander will use the 740 km (460 mi)-long Northeastern Rail Corridor between Toronto and Cochrane which consists of five railway divisions with sections owned by Metrolinx, Ontario Northland and Canadian National. There is some overlap in passenger rail service along this corridor. Metrolinx operates GO Transit trains between Toronto Union Station and Richmond Hill on its Richmond Hill line while Via Rail operates The Canadian between Toronto and Washago. There is also overlapping freight train services operated by Canadian National and Ontario Northland.

== Fleet ==
The restored Northlander service is planned to use three trainsets manufactured by Siemens Mobility. Each trainset consists of one Siemens Charger SC-42 locomotive and three Siemens Venture passenger coaches. The trainsets feature lightweight aluminum car bodies and are designed for bi-directional operation with a cab car.

One passenger car in each trainset will contain "Northlander+" 2+1 seating, a four-seat "business pod" with a table surrounded by privacy walls, and a galley for onboard food and beverage service which will be provided through at-seat cart service rather than a dedicated dining car. The other two cars will have 2+2 coach seating.

Passenger amenities will include Wi-Fi, power outlets and USB charging ports at every seat, tray tables, overhead reading lights, overhead luggage storage, bicycle storage, and digital passenger information displays.

Accessibility features are planned to include built-in wheelchair lifts, accessible washrooms, and accessible seating areas. Braille signage and audio and visual passenger information systems will also be provided.
