= Ontario Northland Railway main line =

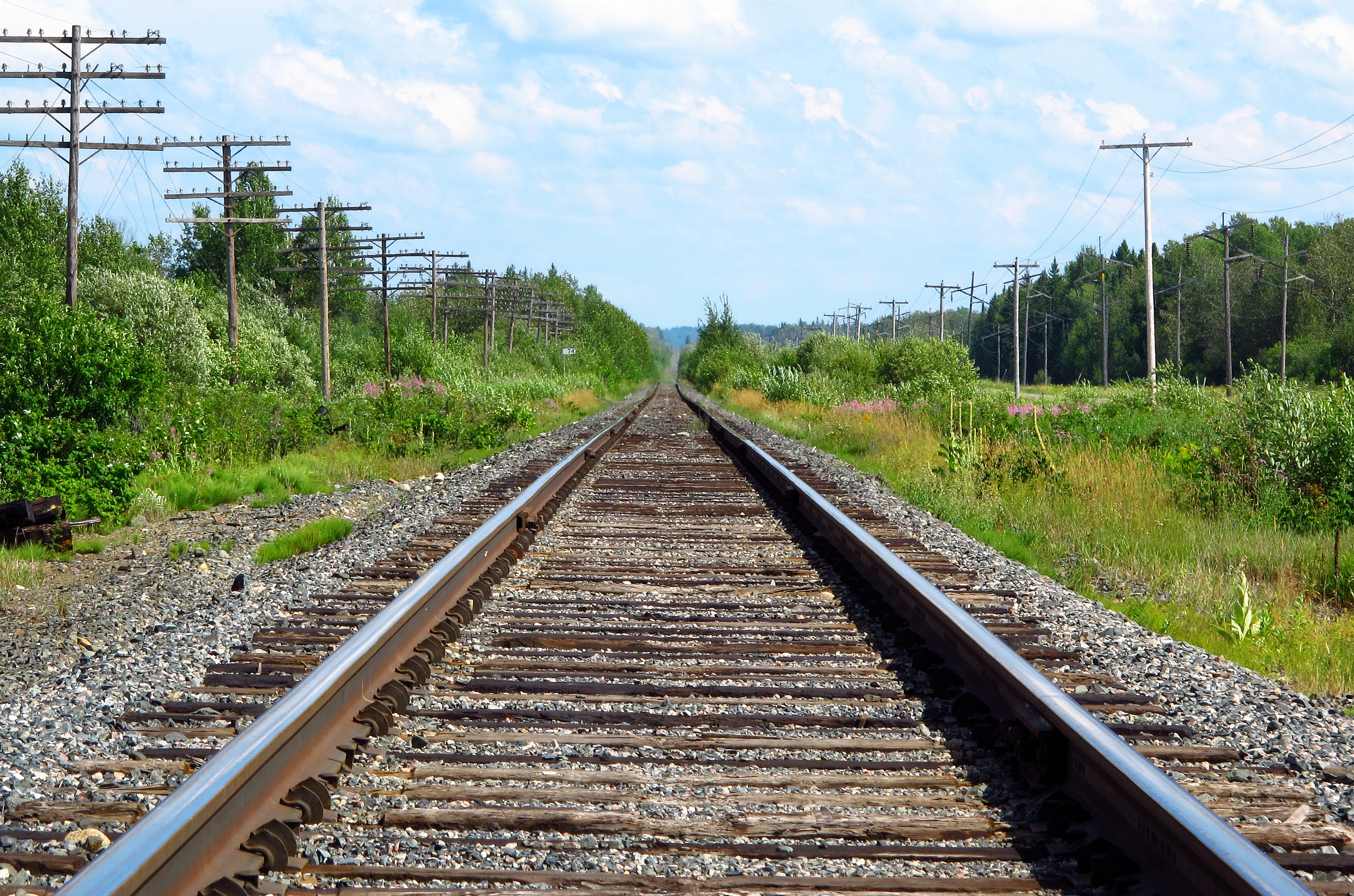
- The Ramore Subdivision of the main line near Val Gagné, Ontario, 2013

Overview
- Owner: Ontario Northland Railway

Service
- Services: Northlander (planned); Polar Bear Express

History
- Opened: 16 January 1905

Technical
- Line length: 438 mi (705 km)
- Track gauge: 1,435 mm (4 ft 8 1/2 in) standard gauge

The Ontario Northland Railway main line is a railway line in the province of Ontario, in Canada. It runs 438 miles (705 km) from North Bay, Ontario, to Moosonee, on the southern end of James Bay. The line was built in stages by the Temiskaming and Northern Ontario Railway, a crown corporation, between 1902 and 1932. The company was renamed the Ontario Northland Railway in 1946, and continues to own and operate the line. The Polar Bear Express provides passenger service between Cochrane, Ontario, and Moosonee. The Ontario Northland plans to resume Northlander passenger service south of Cochrane in 2026.

== History ==
The Ontario provincial government created the Temiskaming and Northern Ontario Railway on 17 March 1902 to construct a railway between North Bay and New Liskeard on Lake Temiskaming. Construction began on 10 May 1902 at Trout Lake near North Bay. Because of the fire risk associated with steam locomotives, the government considered electrifying the line, but rejected the proposal because of insufficient hydroelectric generating capacity along the route.

During construction, the planned northern terminus was extended from New Liskeard to Cochrane to connect with the developing National Transcontinental Railway. Service between North Bay and New Liskeard began on 16 January 1905. The line was extended to Englehart on 1 October 1906 and to Cochrane on 30 November 1908.

An extension north toward James Bay was approved in 1921, with construction beginning in February 1922. The line reached Island Falls Junction, approximately 44.5 miles (71.6 km) north of Cochrane, on 1 November 1923. Construction stalled after Howard Ferguson became Premier of Ontario in 1923 and opposed the full extension to James Bay. Work resumed in 1927, reaching Coral Rapids on 18 October 1928. The line was completed to Moosonee on 15 July 1932.

Prior to 1990, Ontario Northland did not operate its own station in North Bay, instead using stations owned by the Canadian National Railway (CN) and Canadian Pacific Railway. Following the withdrawal of Via Rail passenger service to North Bay, Ontario Northland opened its own North Bay station on 29 August 1990. The new station eliminated the need for a reverse move to access CN's station on the Alderdale Subdivision. CN abandoned its line through North Bay on 24 November 1995.

As part of preparations for the restoration of Northlander passenger rail service, Ontario Northland constructed the North Bay Rail Bypass in 2025. The new connection links North Bay station more directly with the Newmarket Subdivision, bypassing Ontario Northland's yard facilities. The project was intended to reduce operational conflicts and shorten scheduled travel times by approximately 15 minutes.

On 18 March 2026, Ontario Northland acquired the Newmarket Subdivision between the North Bay yard and Washago, where it connects with the CN Bala Subdivision, from CN for CA$138 million. The acquisition effectively extended the main line southward by 127 miles (204 km) and eliminates the need to disassemble freight trains at the North Bay yard before transferring them to CN.

== Subdivisions ==
As of 2023, the Ontario Northland Railway divides its main line into four subdivisions:

- The Temagami Subdivision runs 138.5 miles (222.9 km) from the North Bay yard to Englehart.
- The Ramore Subdivision runs 85.7 miles (137.9 km) from Englehart to the Porquis Junction with the Porcupine Branch in Iroquois Falls. The subdivision also includes the Porcupine Branch, which extends 24 miles (39 km) to Timmins–Porcupine station, for a total length of 109.7 miles (176.5 km).
- The Devonshire Subdivision runs 28.05 miles (45.14 km) from Porquis Junction to Cochrane.
- The Island Falls Subdivision runs 186.2 miles (299.7 km) from Cochrane to Moosonee.
