= Cochrane, Ontario =

Cochrane
- Town (single-tier)
- Town of Cochrane
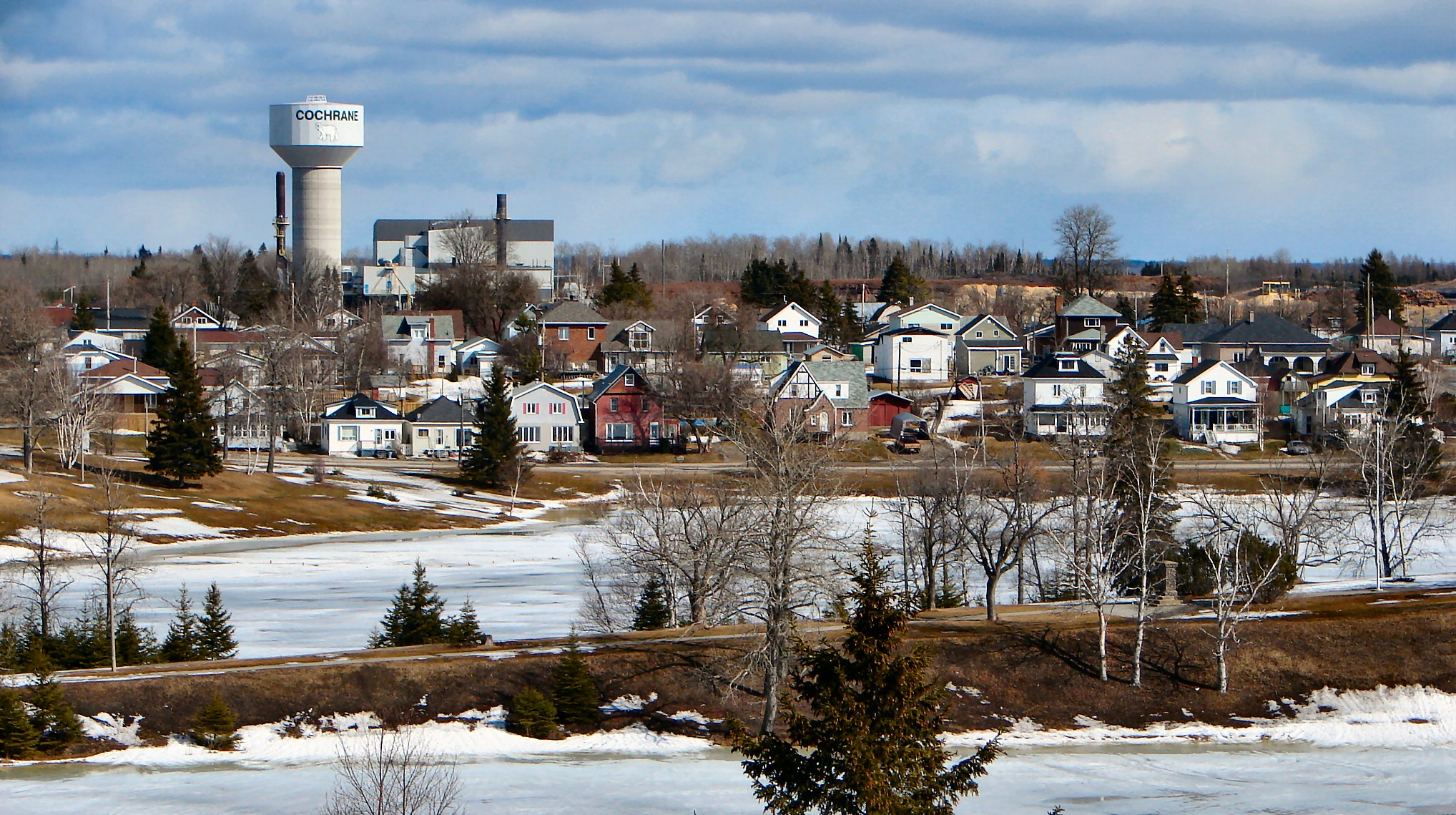
- Cochrane as seen across Lake Commando

- Location within Ontario
- Coordinates: 49°04′14″N 81°01′14″W
- Country: Canada
- Province: Ontario
- District: Cochrane
- Settled: 1908
- Incorporated: January 1, 1910

Government
  - Mayor: Peter Politis
  - Governing Body: Cochrane Town Council
  - Federal riding: Kapuskasing—Timmins—Mushkegowuk (Gaétan Malette, Conservative)
  - Prov. riding: Timiskaming—Cochrane (John Vanthof, NDP)

Area
  - Land: 537.90 km^{2} (207.68 sq mi)
- Elevation: 274.90 m (901.9 ft)

Population (2021)
  - Total: 5,390
  - Density: 10/km^{2} (26/sq mi)
- Time zone: UTC-5 (EST)
  - Summer (DST): UTC-4 (EDT)
- Area code: 705
- Website: www.cochraneontario.com

Cochrane is a town in northeastern Ontario, Canada. It is located east of Kapuskasing, northeast of Timmins, south of Moosonee, and north of Iroquois Falls. It is about a one-hour drive from Timmins and Kapuskasing, the other two major population centres of the region. It is the seat of Cochrane District.

== History ==
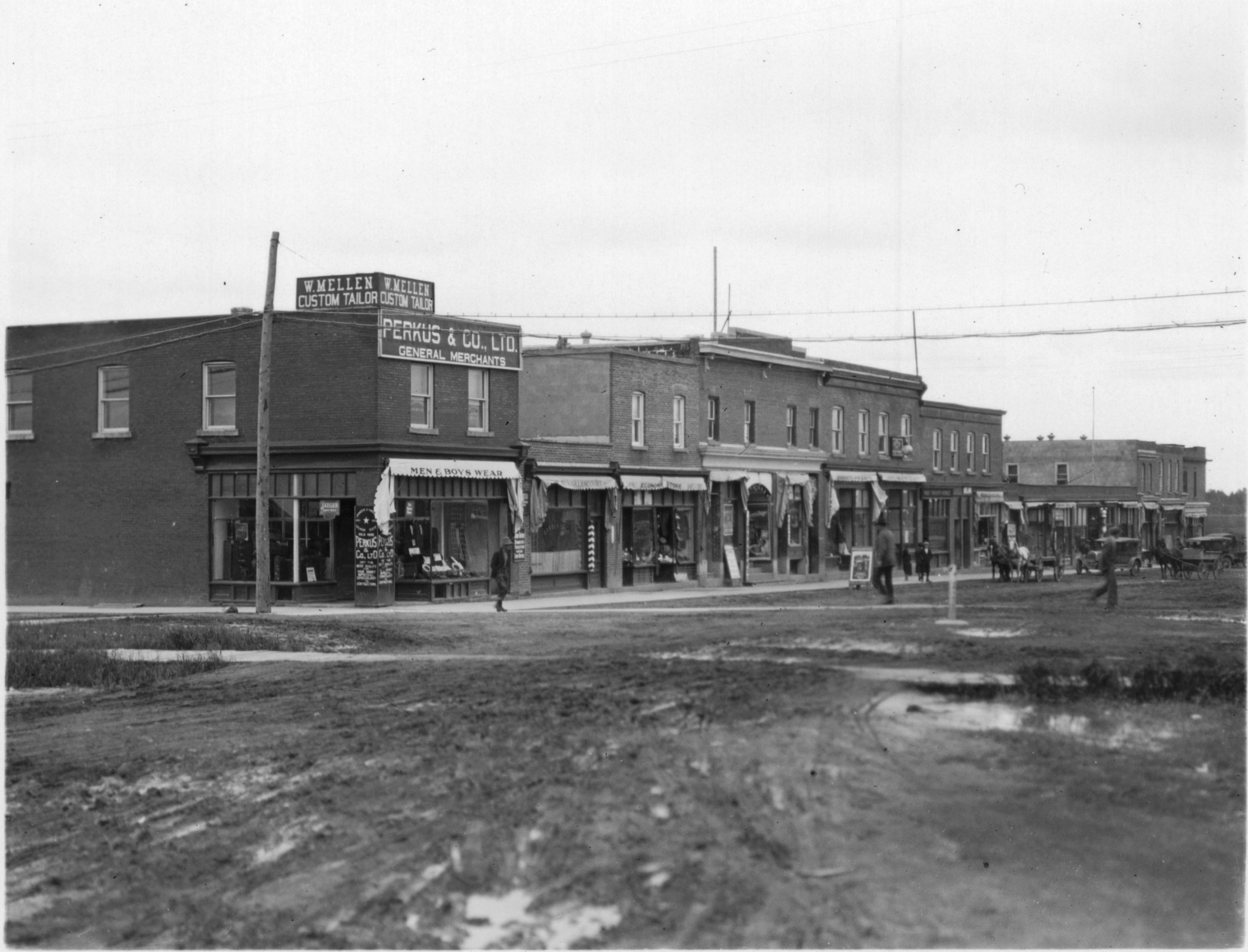
Main street, circa 1925

Before Cochrane was founded, it was used as a summer camping ground by indigenous people, and a stopping place for fur traders travelling to Moose Factory.

In the early 20th century, the National Transcontinental Railway was built through the area, and in 1907, the place was selected as the junction point with the Temiskaming and Northern Ontario Railway. In November 1908, the lots were sold by auction and a railway town formed.

It was incorporated on January 1, 1910, and named after politician and merchant Frank Cochrane, a former mayor of Sudbury and the Minister of Lands, Forests and Mines in the provincial government from 1905 to 1911, then Minister of Railways from 1911 to 1919.

The settlement was devastated by fire in 1910, 1911, and 1916, but was rebuilt each time and became a transportation hub for northern Ontario.

After the Reesor Siding Strike of 1963, Cochrane was the site of the trial for 20 Reesor Siding farmers charged with the killing of 3 union employees.

In 1969, the Town of Cochrane annexed part of the surrounding Township of Glackmeyer, and in 2000, it amalgamated with the surrounding townships of Glackmeyer and Lamarche to create a newly expanded Town of Cochrane.

== Geography ==
=== Climate ===
Cochrane has a subarctic climate (Dfc) with very cold winters and warm summers. Diurnal temperature variation is moderately high throughout the year. Annual snowfall is heavy, averaging 117 inches (297 cm). Precipitation peaks during early fall. Winter typically lasts from the end of October to well into April.

Until 1977, Timmins was used as the source for all weather readings attributed to Cochrane except for exceptional extremes, due to the overall similar climate due to proximity and topography. However, in December 1977, Cochrane temperature readings began to be taken from downtown after a noticeable difference in temperature was recorded two years prior in January 1976. However, to this day, if Cochrane's weather equipment fails at any time, the Timmins temperature readings are used due to the overall similarity.

Climate data for Cochrane
Month	Jan	Feb	Mar	Apr	May	Jun	Jul	Aug	Sep	Oct	Nov	Dec	Year
Record high °C (°F)	7.2 (45.0)	11.7 (53.1)	20.0 (68.0)	30.0 (86.0)	33.9 (93.0)	36.7 (98.1)	37.2 (99.0)	36.1 (97.0)	35.0 (95.0)	28.9 (84.0)	20.0 (68.0)	13.0 (55.4)	37.2 (99.0)
Mean daily maximum °C (°F)	−12.1 (10.2)	−8.9 (16.0)	−1.9 (28.6)	7.4 (45.3)	16.4 (61.5)	21.1 (70.0)	24.0 (75.2)	22.3 (72.1)	15.5 (59.9)	8.2 (46.8)	−0.4 (31.3)	−9.4 (15.1)	6.9 (44.4)
Daily mean °C (°F)	−18.4 (−1.1)	−15.8 (3.6)	−8.9 (16.0)	0.7 (33.3)	9.2 (48.6)	13.8 (56.8)	16.8 (62.2)	15.5 (59.9)	9.9 (49.8)	3.6 (38.5)	−4.5 (23.9)	−15 (5)	0.6 (33.1)
Mean daily minimum °C (°F)	−24.7 (−12.5)	−22.7 (−8.9)	−15.9 (3.4)	−6.0 (21.2)	2.0 (35.6)	6.4 (43.5)	9.5 (49.1)	8.6 (47.5)	4.3 (39.7)	−1.0 (30.2)	−8.5 (16.7)	−20.5 (−4.9)	−5.7 (21.7)
Record low °C (°F)	−47.0 (−52.6)	−45.6 (−50.1)	−41.7 (−43.1)	−31.1 (−24.0)	−13.9 (7.0)	−6.7 (19.9)	−3.0 (26.6)	−2.8 (27.0)	−7.8 (18.0)	−16.0 (3.2)	−38.3 (−36.9)	−45.6 (−50.1)	−47.0 (−52.6)
Average precipitation mm (inches)	72.3 (2.85)	42.4 (1.67)	58.3 (2.30)	44.6 (1.76)	73.2 (2.88)	91.1 (3.59)	90.1 (3.55)	87.9 (3.46)	109.0 (4.29)	77.8 (3.06)	64.0 (2.52)	69.3 (2.73)	880.0 (34.65)
Average rainfall mm (inches)	0.7 (0.03)	1.3 (0.05)	9.7 (0.38)	26.3 (1.04)	69.8 (2.75)	90.5 (3.56)	90.1 (3.55)	87.9 (3.46)	108.1 (4.26)	69.6 (2.74)	25.1 (0.99)	4.1 (0.16)	583.2 (22.96)
Average snowfall cm (inches)	71.6 (28.2)	41.1 (16.2)	48.6 (19.1)	18.4 (7.2)	3.5 (1.4)	0.6 (0.2)	0 (0)	0 (0)	0.9 (0.4)	8.2 (3.2)	38.9 (15.3)	65.1 (25.6)	296.8 (116.9)
Source: Environment Canada

== Demographics ==
In the 2021 Census of Population conducted by Statistics Canada, Cochrane had a population of 5,390 living in 2,316 of its 2,540 total private dwellings, a change of 1.3% from its 2016 population of 5,321. With a land area of 537.9 km^{2} (207.7 sq mi), it had a population density of 10.0/km^{2} (26.0/sq mi) in 2021.

In the 2011 Census, Cochrane had a population of 5,340, a 2.7% decrease from the 2006 Census (5,487), which was itself a 3.6 percent decrease from the 2001 Census. Like many northern Ontario communities, the population decline is due to lack of employment.

Canada census – Cochrane community profile

	2021	2016	2011
Population	5,390 (+1.3% from 2016)	5,321 (-0.4% from 2011)	5,340 (-2.7% from 2006)
Land area	537.90 km^{2} (207.68 sq mi)	539.12 km^{2} (208.16 sq mi)	539.02 km^{2} (208.12 sq mi)
Population density	10.0/km^{2} (26/sq mi)	9.9/km^{2} (26/sq mi)	9.9/km^{2} (26/sq mi)
Median age	43.6 (M: 43.6, F: 43.6)	43.7 (M: 43.4, F: 44.0)
Private dwellings	2,540 (total) 2,316 (occupied)	2,510 (total)	2,407 (total)
Median household income	$75,500	$65,654

References: 2021 2016 2011

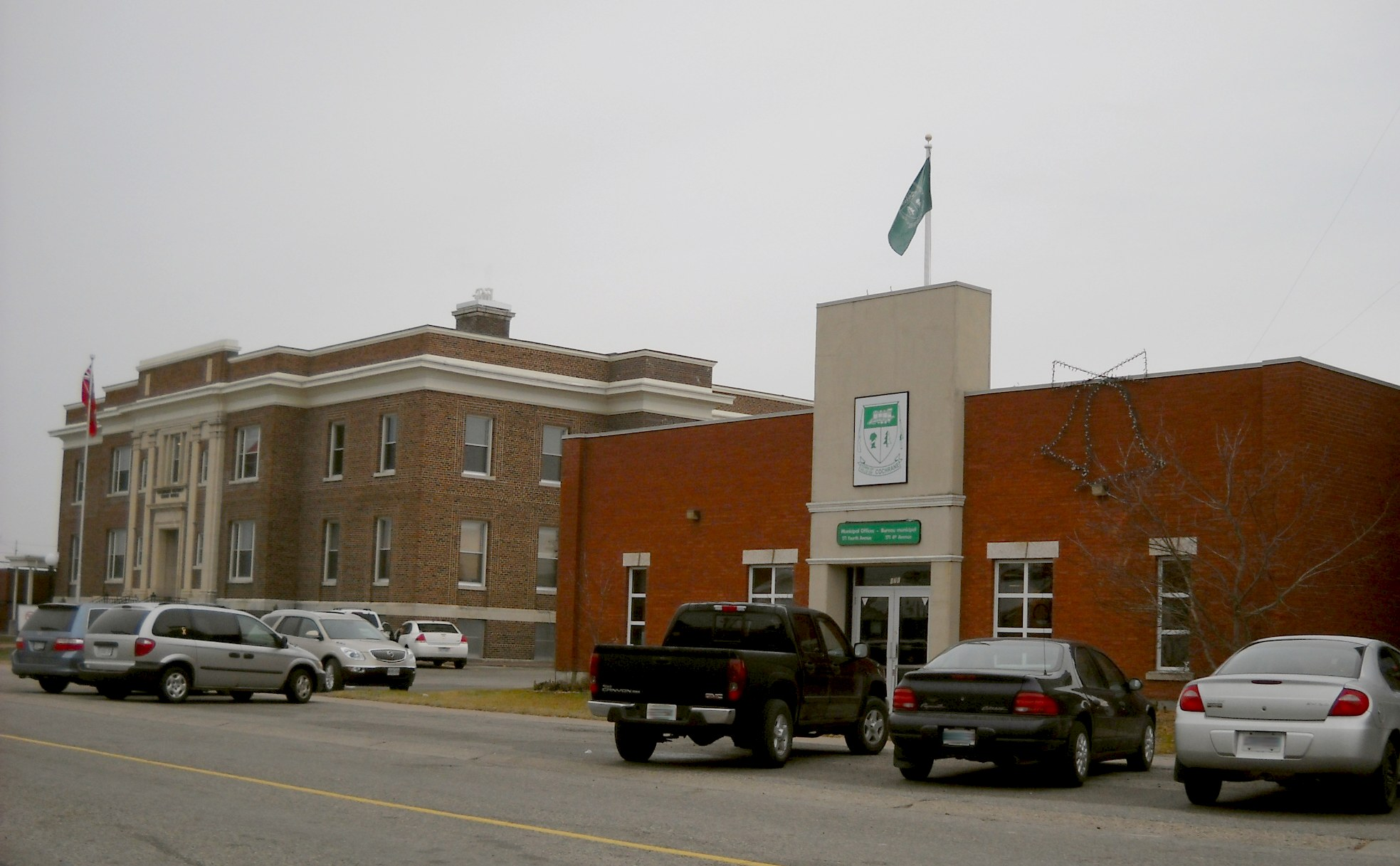
District courthouse and town hall

Historical census populations – Cochrane, Ontario

Year	Pop.	±%
1921	2,655	—
1931	3,963	+49.3%
1941	2,844	−28.2%
1951	3,401	+19.6%
1956	3,695	+8.6%
1961	4,521	+22.4%

Year	Pop.	±%
1966	4,775	+5.6%
1971	4,965	+4.0%
1976	4,990	+0.5%
1981	4,848	−2.8%
1986	4,662	−3.8%
1991	4,585	−1.7%

Year	Pop.	±%
1996	4,443	−3.1%
2001	5,690	+28.1%
2006	5,487	−3.6%
2011	5,340	−2.7%
2016	5,321	−0.4%
2021	5,390	+1.3%

Population counts are not adjusted for boundary changes and merger.
Source: Statistics Canada

Mother tongue (2021):

- English as first language: 59.3%
- French as first language: 32.9%
- English and French as first language: 4.3%
- Other as first language: 2.6%

== Economy ==
The main industries in Cochrane are transportation, railway, tourism, and forestry.

Marginal farming also exists around Cochrane. Though the soil is considered to be of good quality, the growing season is too short to have substantial crop production.

== Attractions ==
=== Polar bears ===
The town contains many references to polar bears. Its mascot is a large polar bear statue known as Chimo, erected in the early 1970s.

There are also live polar bears at the Cochrane Polar Bear Habitat, which opened in the summer of 2004. Polar bears from the Toronto Zoo were relocated to Cochrane while a new pavilion was being constructed. Those two polar bears were returned to the Toronto Zoo in the summer of 2009. In late May 2012, a new bear arrived at the Polar Bear Habitat, Ganuk. Also in 2012, a second bear, Inukshuk, was brought from the Toronto Zoo to The Polar Bear Habitat as a part-time resident. After successfully breeding 5 times in both the Toronto and Quebec Zoos, Inukshuk is now a permanent resident in Cochrane. In 2016 the habitat gained a third bear named Henry who came all the way from Sea World on the Gold Coast in Australia.

=== Cochrane Heritage Village ===
Located on the grounds of the Cochrane Polar Bear Habitat, the Cochrane Heritage Village has multiple replica buildings housing historic settings, which reflect life in Cochrane in the early 1900's. The railway station has a set up to view a video of a history of the Town of Cochrane as well as artifacts and photos representing railroad history. There are train rides available in a small motor train. There is a historic butcher shop, doctor’s office, a shoe repair shop, blacksmith shop and hardware store. Other buildings include a homestead house, barn, a one room schoolhouse and a trapper’s cabin. There is a sit in restaurant for fast foods and snacks. The Heritage Village is open year round and often has costumed hosts.

=== Cochrane Classic Vintage Riders Snowmobile Museum ===
Also located on the grounds of the Polar Bear Habitat, is the Cochrane Classic Vintage Riders Snowmobile Museum. This museum is the second largest snowmobile museum in Canada, but the largest that is open to the public. This exhibit is open year round, and attracts sledders from across the province and out of province as well.

=== Cochrane Public Library ===
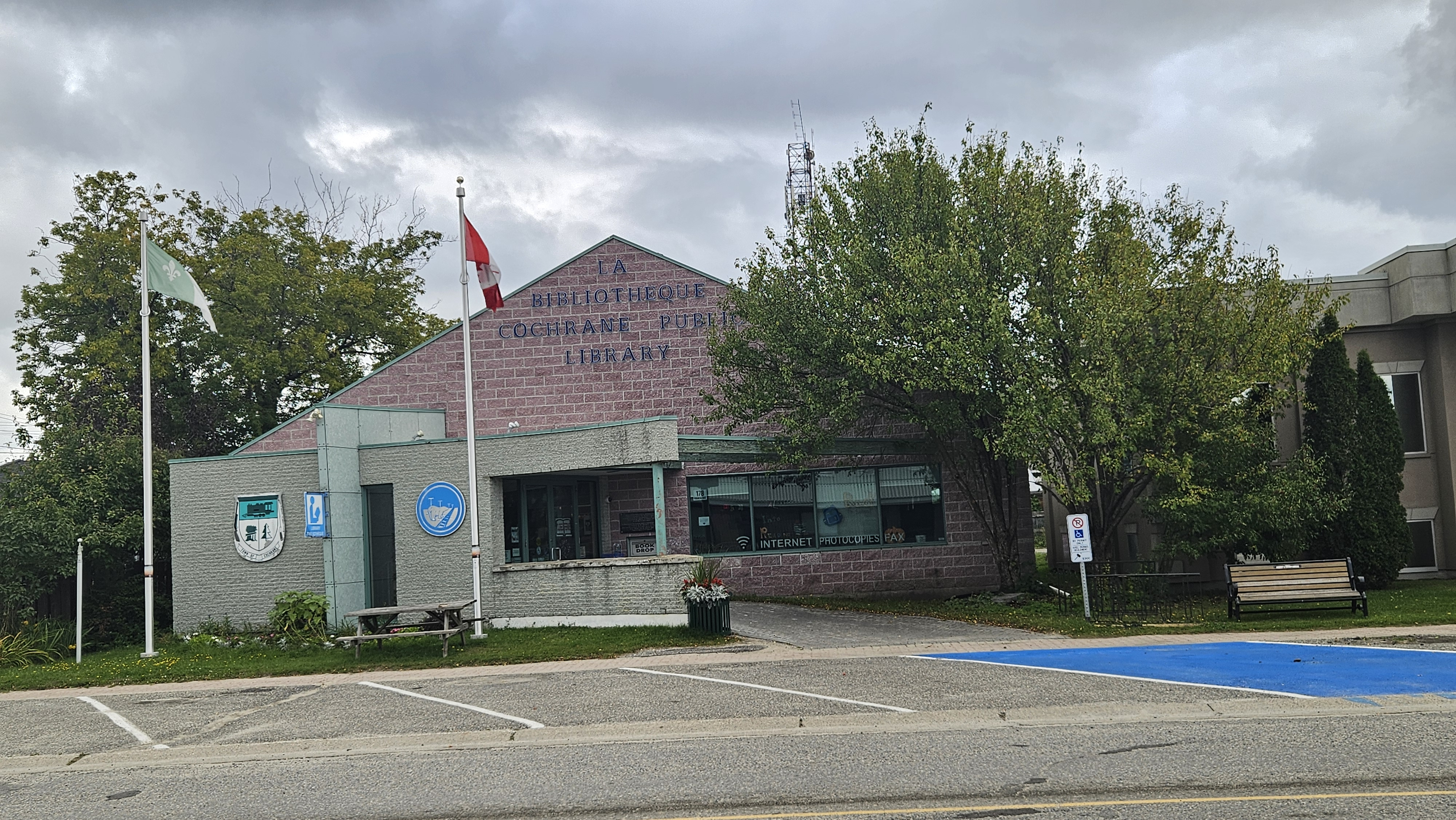
Cochrane Public Library in September 2025

The Cochrane Public Library was established in 1917 and houses a large collection of books, DVDs, puzzles, video games, and other material. It offers tourists snowshoes and skis for lending in the winter and a safe place to enjoy. Downstairs there is an Art Gallery as well as a book saleroom. Coffee is available for purchase. The library houses the town's archives, which is a wealth of local history.

== Sports ==
=== Ice hockey ===
Cochrane residents traditionally place hockey highly among their cultural values and native French and English speakers use the sport as a common ground to connect on.

The town of Cochrane built and maintains the Tim Horton's Event Centre, which opened in 2006 and seats a capacity of over 800. Numerous construction delays hindered its official opening. The Tim Horton Museum is also situated in the facility and contains hockey memorabilia.

From 2014 to 2023, the arena was home to the Cochrane Crunch, a Canadian Jr. A hockey team. The Crunch played in the NOJHL, and in 2014/15 captured their first Eastern Division Championship. With an average attendance of 466, the small town placed third in the league. In the 2017/2018 season, the team became the East division champions and later going on to become league champions, who would go on to compete for the Dudley Hewitt Cup. The team and the town of Cochrane successfully won their bid to host the Dudley Hewitt Cup in 2019.

== Transportation ==
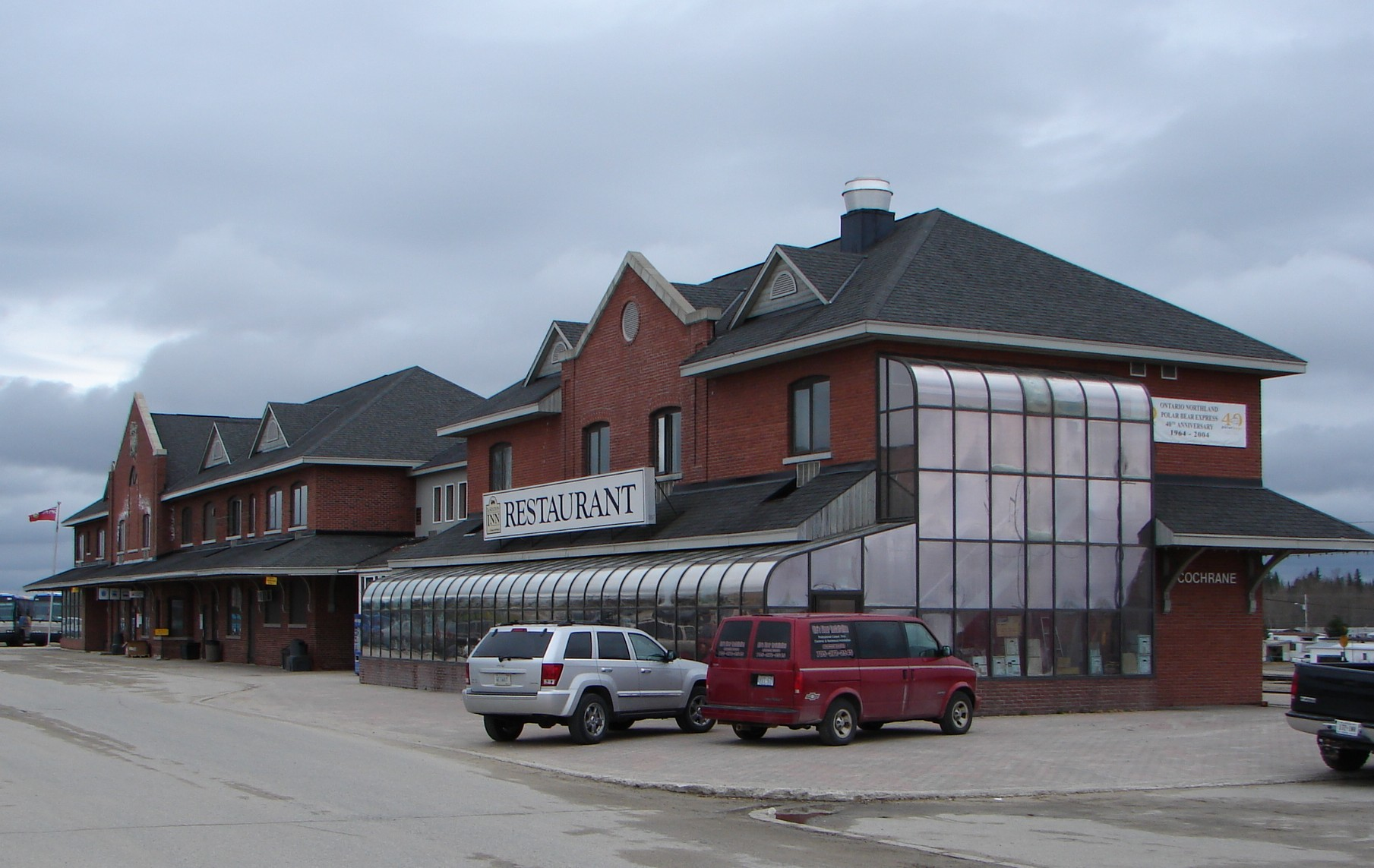
Cochrane railway station

=== Roads ===
Cochrane is situated along Ontario Highway 11. The town is close to the northern end of the road system in the area. The last roads in this part of Ontario end about halfway between Cochrane and Moosonee at Otter Rapids.

=== Railway ===
The Cochrane railway station is operated by the Ontario Northland Railway and serves as the southern terminus of the Polar Bear Express which operates five days per week to and from Moosonee.

=== Airport ===
The town is served by the Cochrane Aerodrome, but has no scheduled flights.

== See also ==
- List of francophone communities in Ontario
- List of towns in Ontario
- List of population centres in Ontario
