= Train of Tomorrow =

American demonstrator train

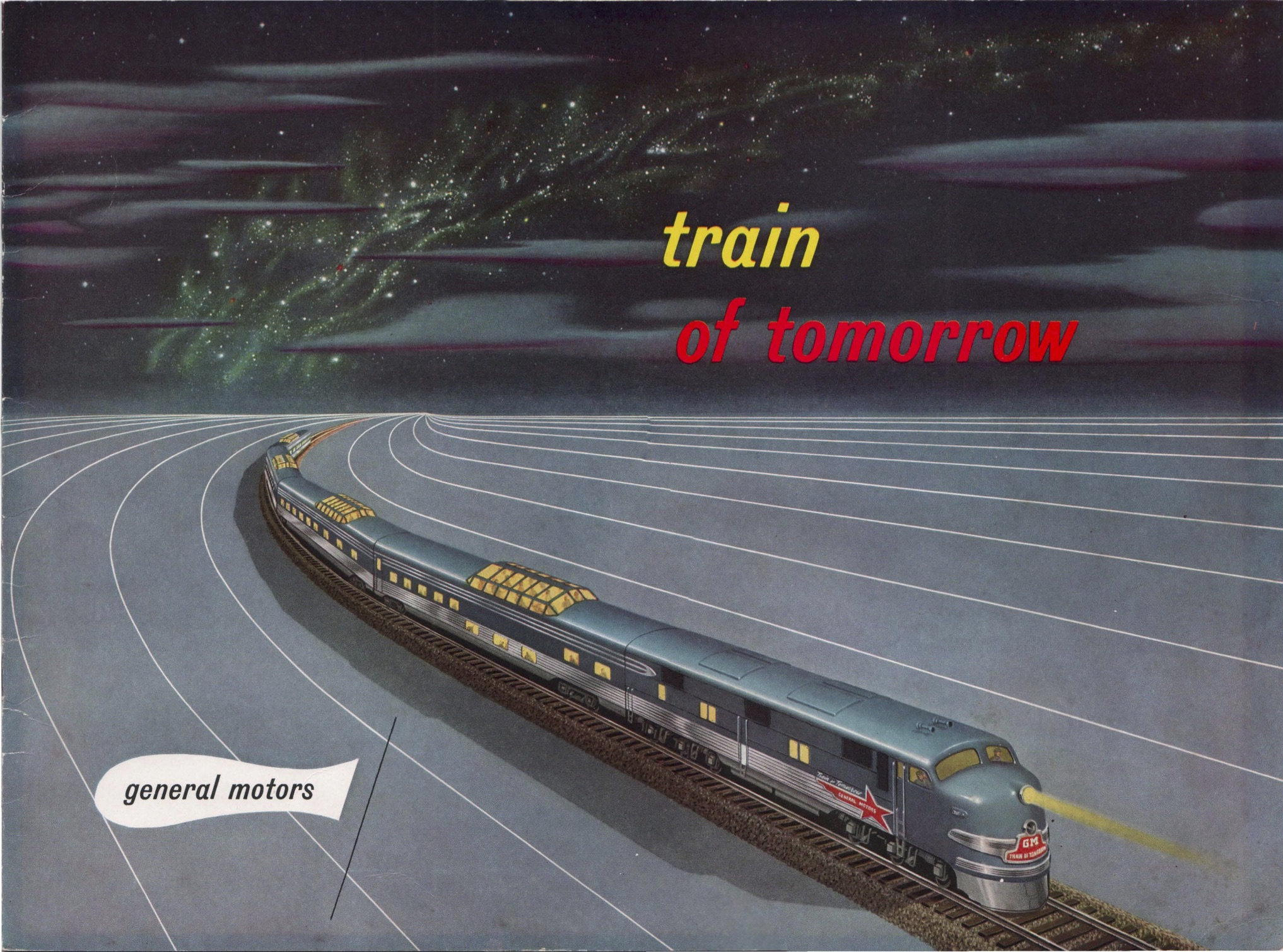
- Cover of a GM promotional brochure depicting the new train
- In service: 1947–1964
- Manufacturer: General Motors and Pullman-Standard
- Constructed: 1945–1947
- Entered service: 1947
- Scrapped: 1964
- Number built: 1 4-car set
- Number in service: 0
- Number preserved: 1 car (Moon Glow)
- Number scrapped: 3 cars
- Formation: Dome coach; Dome dining car; Dome sleeping car; Dome observation car
- Fleet numbers: UP 7010 (Star Dust); UP 8010 (Sky View); UP 9015 (Moon Glow)
- Capacity: 72 (48 lower, 24 dome) (Star Dust); 52 (34 lower, 18 dome) (Sky View); 68 (44 lower, 24 dome) (Moon Glow); 44 (20 sleeping, 24 dome) (Dream Cloud); 216 (total)

Specifications
- Car body construction: Steel and glass
- Car length: 79 feet 2 inches (24.13 m) (over end sills); 85 feet (26 m) (over buffers when coupled); 71 feet (22 m) (locomotive); 411 feet (125 m) (total)
- Height: 15 feet 6 inches (4.72 m) (rail to Astra-Dome roof)
- Wheelbase: 59 feet 6 inches (18.14 m)
- Maximum speed: 100 miles per hour (160 km/h)
- Weight: 147,000 pounds (67,000 kg) (Star Dust); 160,000 pounds (73,000 kg) (Sky View); 141,000 pounds (64,000 kg) (Moon Glow); 150,000 pounds (68,000 kg) (Dream Cloud); 318,000 pounds (144,000 kg) (locomotive); 920,000 pounds (420,000 kg) (total empty); 977,000 pounds (443,000 kg) (total loaded)
- Prime mover(s): (2) 1,000-horsepower (750 kW), V12 GM Diesel engines
- Engine type: V12 two-stroke diesel engine
- Cylinder count: (2) 12
- Power output: 2,000 horsepower (1,500 kW)
- HVAC: Steam generator (heat)
- AAR wheel arrangement: A1A-A1A (locomotive)

The Train of Tomorrow was an American demonstrator train built as a collaboration between General Motors (GM) and Pullman-Standard between 1945 and 1947. It was the first new train to consist entirely of dome cars, which were the brainchild of GM vice president and Electro-Motive Division (EMD) general manager Cyrus Osborn, who conceived the idea while riding in either an F-unit or a caboose in the Rocky Mountains in Glenwood Canyon, Colorado. After GM built a 45-foot (14 m) scale model of the train for $101,772 ($1,641,030 in 2024 dollars) and displayed it to 350 officials from 55 different Class I railroads in 1945, the Train of Tomorrow was built by Pullman-Standard between October 1946 and May 1947.

The train consisted of four cars: a chair car (Star Dust), a dining car (Sky View), a sleeping car (Dream Cloud), and a lounge-observation car (Moon Glow), all featuring "Astra-Domes". It was pulled by a largely stock EMD E7A. Its dining car, Sky View, was the first dome diner to be built and the first diner of any kind with an all-electric kitchen. The train was constructed with low-alloy, high-tensile steel and Thermopane glass for its domes and windows. Although GM never publicly stated the total price of the Train of Tomorrow, contemporary sources estimated it at between $1 million and $1.5 million.

After being christened at a dedication ceremony in Chicago on May 28, 1947, the Train of Tomorrow embarked on a barnstorming tour of the United States and Canada that lasted for 28 months, covered 65,000 miles (105,000 km), and visited 181 cities and towns. During its tour, the train was ridden or toured by over 5.7 million people, and was seen by an estimated 20 million people. After its tour was completed on October 30, 1949, the train was sold to the Union Pacific for $500,000, and its four cars were put into service between Portland and Seattle on June 18, 1950. The cars were retired from service between 1961 and 1965, and all but one were eventually scrapped. Moon Glow sat in a scrap yard for almost two decades before being discovered by the National Railway Historical Society (NRHS), who purchased and transported it to the Ogden Union Station Museum, where it is undergoing restoration.

== Background ==
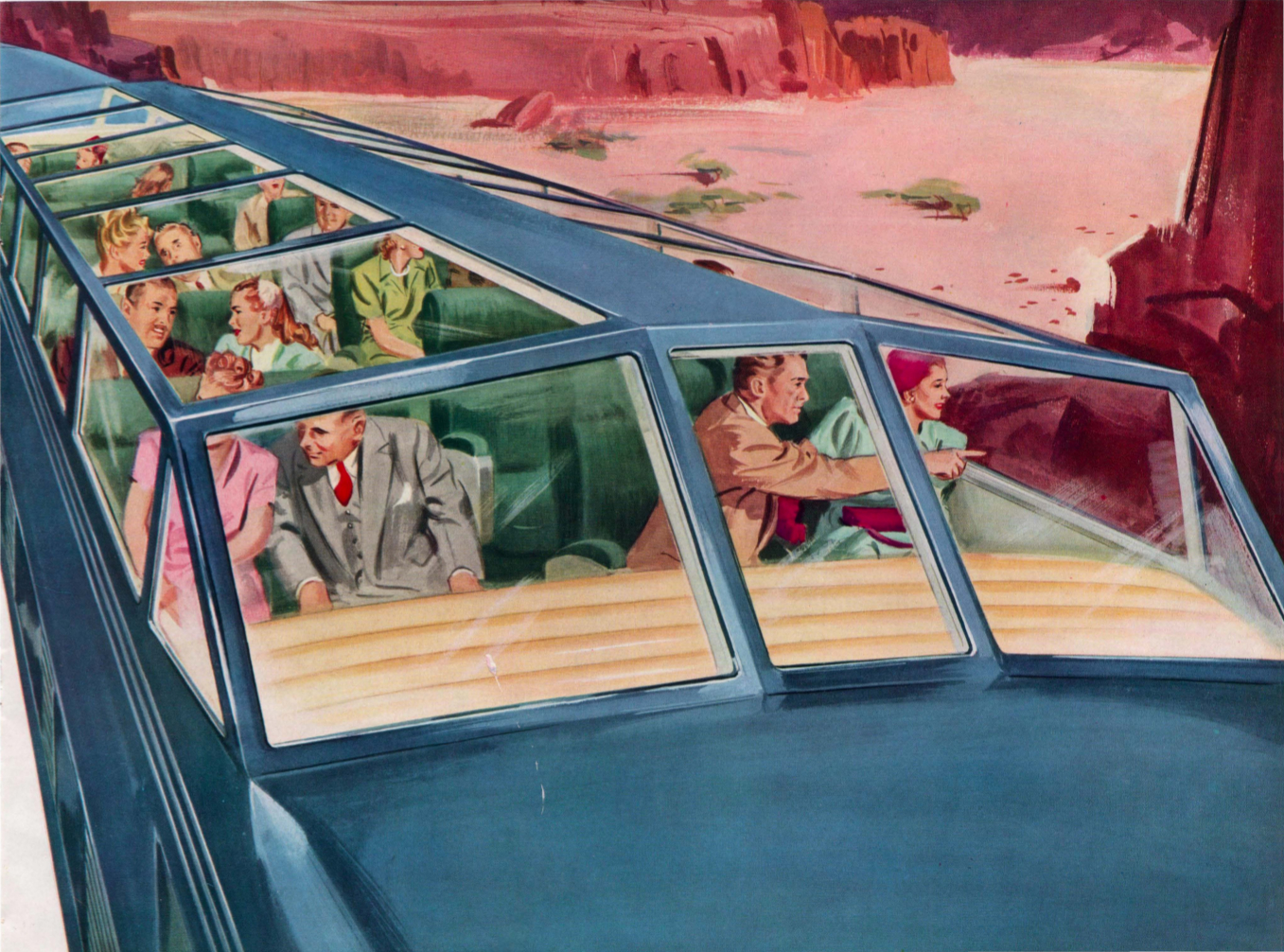
Astra-Dome

The Train of Tomorrow's direct antecedents were the original American lightweight passenger trains, most notably the Burlington's original Pioneer Zephyr (1934), the Santa Fe's lightweight Super Chief (1937), and the Illinois Central's Panama Limited (1942).

The Burlington's construction of the first modern dome car in 1945 also preceded the construction of the Train of Tomorrow. Ralph Budd was one of the first people to see the sketches of the Train of Tomorrow's Astra-Dome cars, and was inspired by them to create the first modern dome car for the Burlington in 1945, two years before the Train of Tomorrow was unveiled. Prior to the Burlington dome, there were a number of precursors: T. J. McBride of Winnipeg received a patent for a dome sleeper in 1891, Coeur d'Alene Railway & Navigation Company chief engineer R. C. Riblet designed an electric dome car at roughly the same time, the Canadian Pacific Railway built four observation dome cars based on McBride's design between 1902 and 1906 (which were in service only until 1909), and the Wichita Falls and Southern Railroad build a "combination parlor-coach-baggage-observatory-dome car" in the 1930s.

The Train of Tomorrow was also a response to over seven years of a relative lack of development and construction of railroad equipment caused by World War II. Even during the first half of 1947, all American railroads combined ordered fewer than 100 new passenger cars, according to Robert R. Young. In contrast, by the end of 1948, after the beginning of the Train of Tomorrow's promotional tour, there were over 1,800 passenger cars on order, although some of them had been ordered as early as 1944, but had not yet been delivered.

== Genesis and design ==
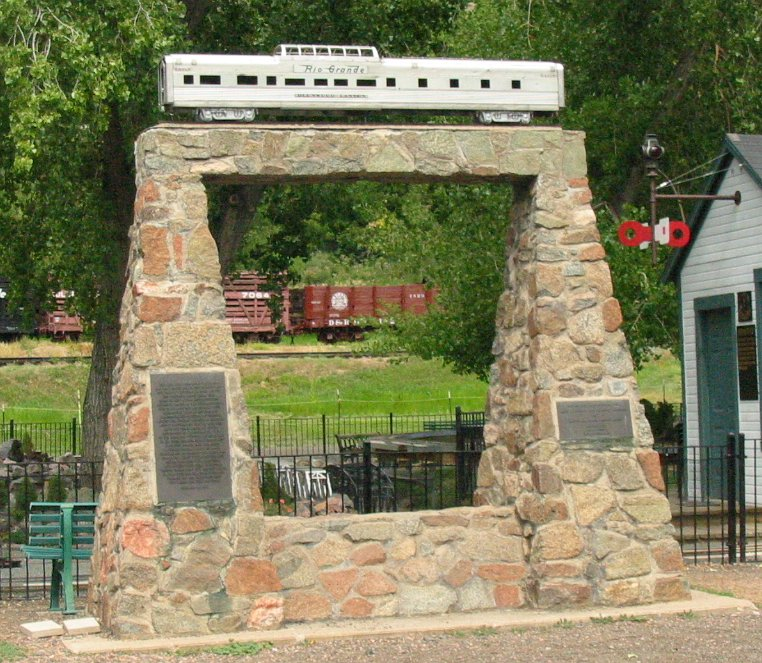
The Glenwood Canyon dome car monument after being moved to the Colorado Railroad Museum

According to multiple sources, the Train of Tomorrow's dome cars were the brainchild of GM vice president and EMD general manager Cyrus Osborn, who conceived the idea while riding in an F-unit in the Rocky Mountains in Glenwood Canyon, Colorado. According to Osborn himself, however, it was actually a similar ride in the "cupola of the caboose that gave me the idea." After Osborn was reassured by EMD engineers that a dome car that would not be more limited in height clearance than a caboose could be built, he turned his idea over to Harley Earl and the General Motors (GM) Styling Section in Detroit. The Styling Section then collected feedback on contemporary passenger car design from its designers and railroad passengers before committing to a design process anticipated by Earl to take 90 days and cost US$25,000, which resulted in 1,500 sketches and 100 final design ideas.

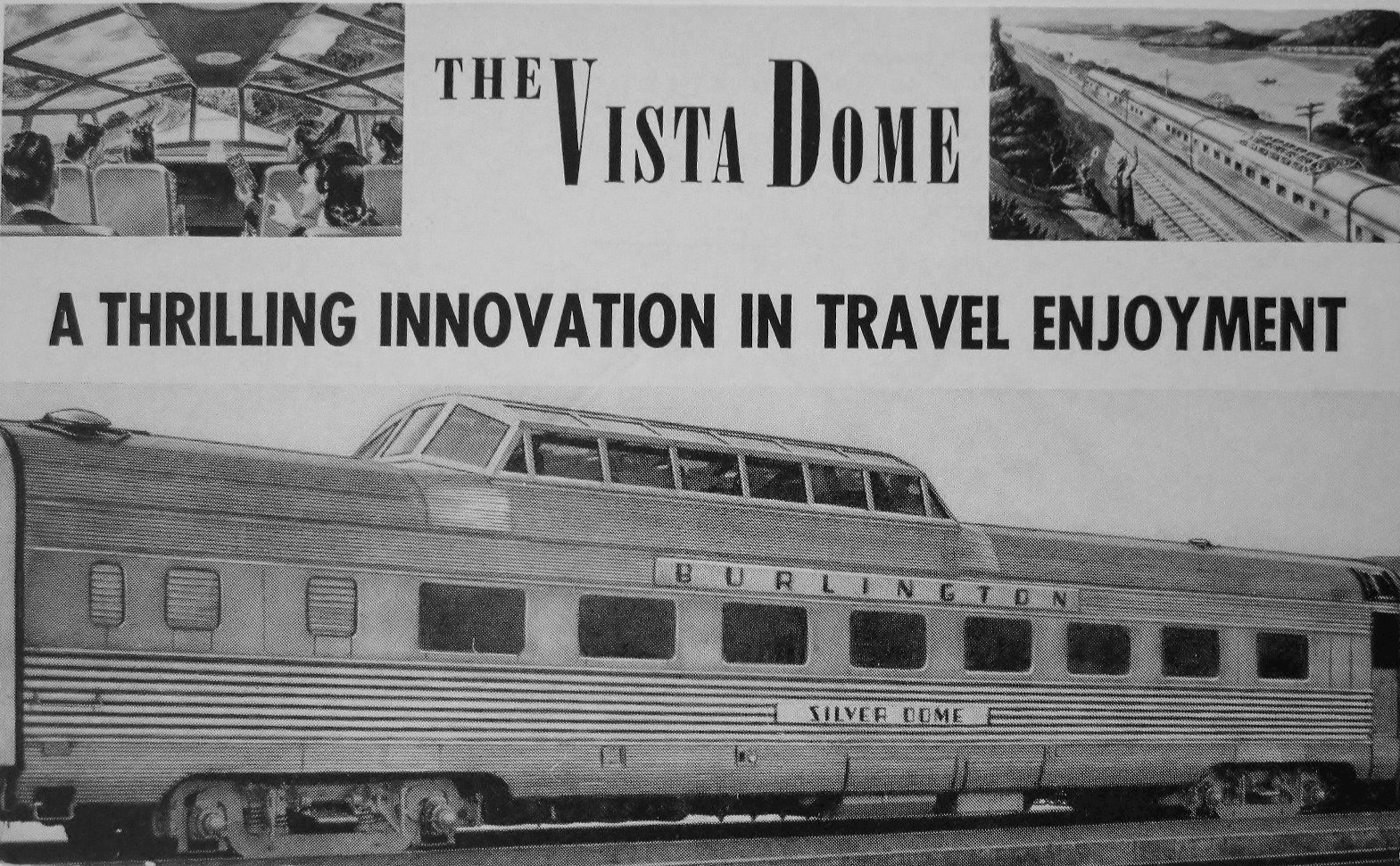
Burlington's Silver Dome

After the final design ideas were derived from the sketches, GM's Styling Section began building a 45-foot (13.72 m) scale model of a four-car train (each car was 10 feet (3.05 m) long), built of metal, plastic, and wood and featuring 175 painted clay figures of people and even tiny details such as dinner knives and cigarette packs. The dining car alone featured 1,100 objects. After being completed, the model was unveiled in a former Cadillac showroom in Oak Park, Illinois, where it was displayed with a custom-built Western mountain scene backdrop illuminated with stage lighting. From February 21 to June 23, 1945, the model was shown to 350 officials from 55 different Class I railroads, most notably Ralph Budd of the Burlington, who was so moved by the display that he almost immediately ordered the passenger car Silver Alchemy (No. 4714) be converted into a dome and renamed Silver Dome.

By November 1945, the model had cost $101,772, more than four times its budget, but before the Train of Tomorrow made its debut, 49 dome cars were on loan with the Budd Company alone. GM allowed any carbuilder to freely use its designs without licenses or royalties, as it "saw the program not only as a research project to stimulate interest in new car design and construction but also as a way to encourage railroads to order new cars with GM railroad-related products on-board." After being revised, the model was repeatedly displayed at auto shows and other GM exhibitions through 1955, including at Chicago's Museum of Science and Industry and at Motorama, before last being seen in Cincinnati in 1955 at a ceremony honoring Osborn.

== Development and construction ==
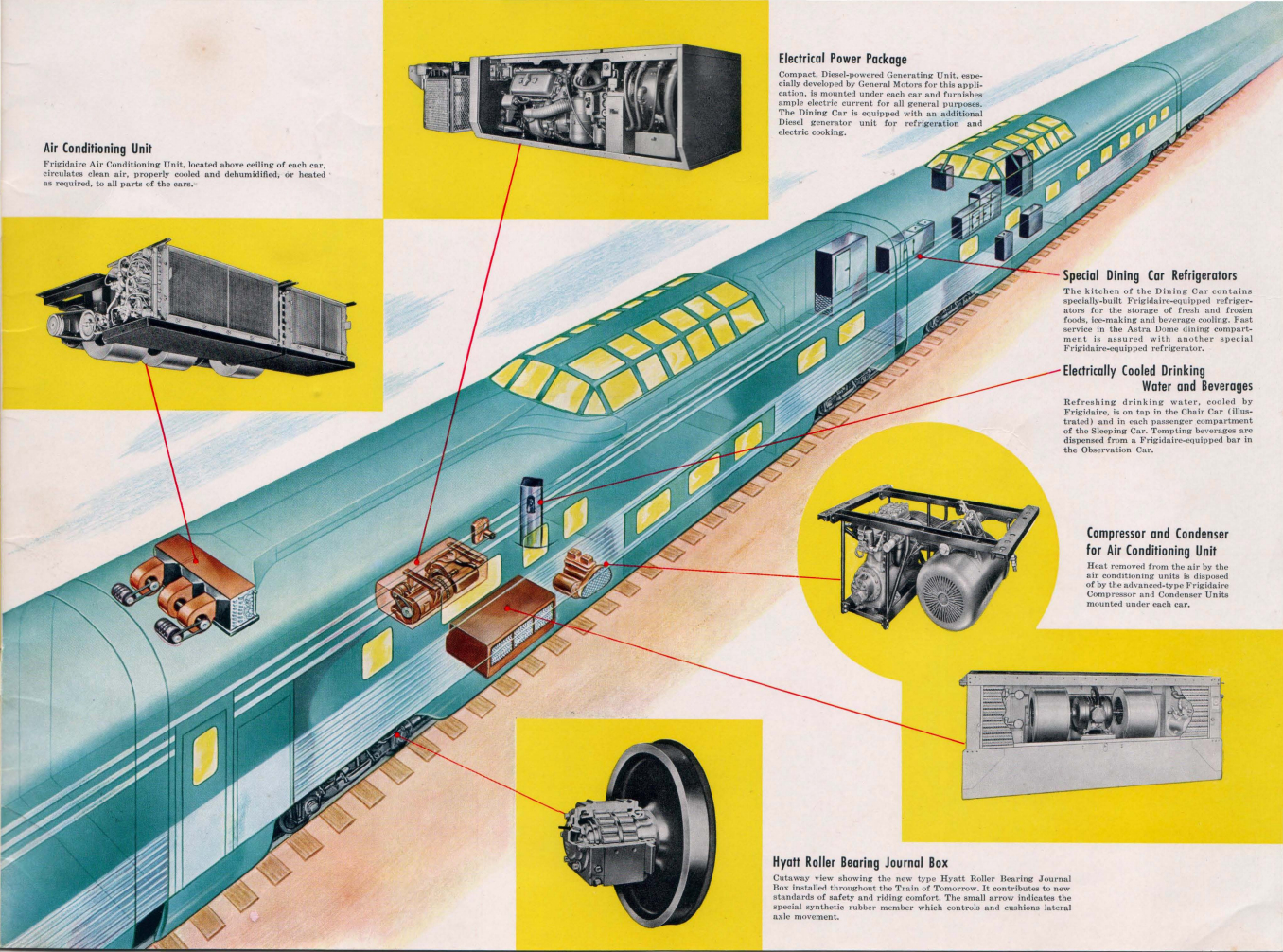
Technical features

Design of the Train of Tomorrow began in 1944, as a collaboration between General Motors (GM) and Pullman-Standard. According to author Brian Solomon, the train "was strictly intended as an innovation showcase, and...the automotive manufacturer had no interest in building its own passenger trains." According to a contemporary Life magazine article, its development cost approximately $1.5 million. GM had no less than five of its divisions involved with the train: the Electro-Motive Division (EMD) built its E7A locomotive, the Detroit Diesel Division and the Delco Products Division collaborated on the train's generating equipment, the Frigidaire Division built its air conditioning system, the Hyatt Bearings Division built its anti-friction, journal-box bearings, and GM's Styling Division concentrated on its interior design. GM did not, however, foray into the field of building passenger railroad cars, until its introduction of the Aerotrain a decade later.

According to authors Gary Dolzall and Stephen Dolzall, the train was intended to be the "ultimate train for the postwar era" and an "embodiment of the latest passenger train design". Author Frank Richter termed it the "latest state-of-the-art in passenger trains", while fellow author William L. Bird described it as "GM's traveling exhibit of Diesel-powered passenger comfort". According to GM president Harlow Curtice, the Train of Tomorrow was an experiment in both design and mechanics, similar to its automotive concept cars such as the Le Sabre, XP-300, and Y-Job.

GM's executive committee formally committed to building the Train of Tomorrow in fall 1945. After soliciting proposals from multiple car manufacturers, GM signed a contract with Pullman-Standard on November 6, 1945. The cars were all to be built to Association of American Railroads (AAR) standards, but GM did not supply Pullman-Standard with blueprints or specifications for building the cars, instead concentrating on their interior design. EMD did supply inspectors to Pullman-Standard who had the power to approve or reject changes to the design and workmanship in the construction of the cars, however. After creating a final set of drawings, specifications, and full-scale wooden mockups, Pullman-Standard made arrangements with the War Production Board to obtain steel for the train, but settled for flat glass instead of curved glass, because the latter was still required for the American war effort. GM also decided not to charge royalties on the use of the dome car concept by any car builders. Construction of the Train of Tomorrow began in October 1946, and took until May 17, 1947.

The Train of Tomorrow consisted of four cars: a chair car (Star Dust), a dining car (Sky View), a sleeping car (Dream Cloud), and a lounge-observation car (Moon Glow), all featuring "Astra-Domes". The domes on the Train of Tomorrow each measured 30 feet (9.1 m) in length, 10 feet (3.0 m) in width, and 2 feet (0.61 m) in height, and sat 24 people apiece. The domes were made with Thermopane glass, developed by Libbey-Owens-Ford, and consisted of a plate-glass exterior layer and a shatterproof interior layer with a pocket of air between to provide thermal and sound insulation. The Thermopane glass was also resistant to heat and glare-free. The low profile of the domes allowed them to operate on most mainlines, including those with low clearances, such as on the Boston & Albany. Like the dome windows, the rest of the windows in the train were made of Thermopane and "designed for maximum viewing of the passing scenery". They ranged in size from 3 feet (0.91 m) for sleeping car Dream Cloud's roomettes to 5 feet 2 inches (1.57 m) in Dream Cloud's two drawing rooms and the chair car Star Dust.

Including the domes, the total height of the cars "from rail to roof" was 15 feet 6 inches (4.72 m). Each car measured 85 feet (25.91 m) in length, and weighed 150,000 pounds (68,000 kg) when unloaded. Each of the cars was built using low-alloy, high-tensile steel, and constructed using the welded-girder technique. The trucks on the train's passenger cars were developed from locomotive trucks, with outside-mounted swing hangers spaced 96 inches (240 cm) apart (instead of the typical practice of mounting them 56 inches (142 cm) apart on the inside of the trucks) and rolling bearing journal boxes, which helped to improve truck alignment, smooth the train's ride, and reduce body roll on curves from 28 inches (71 cm) to 6 inches (15 cm).

The Train of Tomorrow had a blue-green and silver livery described by author Keith Lovegrove as having an "astral theme", consisting of a "wide belt of stainless steel wrapping the midriff of the predominantly dark-blue train". The blue-green exterior paint was a high-gloss enamel Dulux paint produced by DuPont, and the train's underframe was painted black.

All the cars on the train featured Seamloc carpet made by Goodall Fabrics, in a palette of colors known as "Araby" (consisting of the colors Araby Peach, Dove Taupe, Jade, Lido Sand, Persian Rose, Silver Grey, and Turquoise). The hard flooring and wall covering materials used were Es Es and V-Board, both plastic products created by the United States Rubber Company, in the colors blue, brown, coral, gray-blue, gray-green, gray-tan, green, purple, and red. The train's interior paint was a semigloss from DuPont, its pull-down shades were manufactured by the Adams and Westlake Company and matched to the exterior colors of the train, while its "decorative but nonfunctional drapes" were supplied by Goodall Fabrics and backed with sateen from Lusskey, White, and Coolidge. The train featured couch seats from Haywood-Wakefield in chair car Star Dust and all of its domes except that of dining car Sky View; they were of tubular metal construction with sponge rubber seat and back cushions that could both rotate and recline, and each also had movable footrests and armrests with ash receivers. Those in the chair car had high backs, while those in the domes had low backs that measured only 25 inches (64 cm) from the seat cushion to the top of the headrest.

The Train of Tomorrow featured numerous additional amenities, including Diesel auxiliary power units (head-end power) on each car, an all-electric kitchen, fluorescent light fixtures throughout the train, a public address system, and even a radiotelephone, which during demonstrations placed a call to the ocean liner RMS Queen Elizabeth while at sea. Each car on the train also had a 4-short-ton (3.6 t) and a 6-short-ton (5.4 t) air conditioning unit.

In all, the train could carry a capacity of 216 passengers. It measured 411 feet (125 m) in overall length, and weighted a total of 920,000 pounds (420,000 kg) when unloaded and roughly 977,000 pounds (443,000 kg) when fully loaded. GM never publicly stated the total price of the Train of Tomorrow, although contemporary sources estimated it at between $1 million and $1.5 million.

=== EMD E7A locomotive no. 765 ===
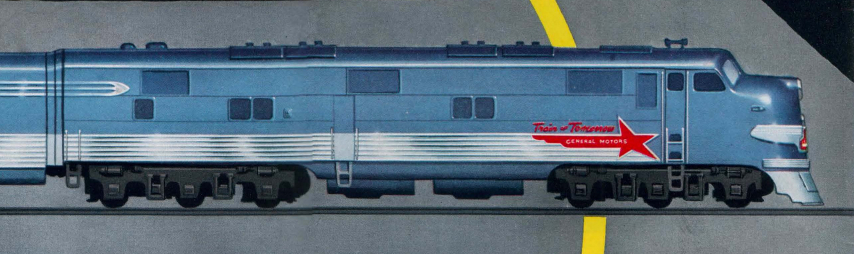
EMD E7A locomotive no. 765

The Train of Tomorrow was pulled by a largely stock EMD E7A that was given road number 765 because it was built for order number 765. It featured two 1,000-horsepower (750 kW), V12 GM Diesel engines mated to direct current (DC) generators that powered traction motors on each of the locomotive's trucks, which both had three axles. In total, the locomotive was rated at 2,000 horsepower (1,500 kW), and could operate at 100 miles per hour (160 km/h). The prime movers had a power range between 275 and 800 rpm. Behind the prime movers, the locomotive had a steam generator used to heat passenger cars. The cab of the E7A featured two swivel chairs, one for the engineer and the other for the fireman, and controls purposely designed to be similar to those used on steam locomotives. The cab was also soundproofed and heated during the winter.

The locomotive measured 71 feet (22 m) in length and weighed 318,000 pounds (144,000 kg) when fully loaded. Its exterior featured the GM logo on its side, "set in a graphic representation of a shooting star", and another GM logo with the words "Train of Tomorrow" on its nose. According to author Ric Morgan, it was "just a standard Diesel locomotive" aside from these unique graphics and cosmetic corrugated stainless steel added to match the exterior design of the cars. It had a skirt on its front with doors providing access to the front coupler.

According to Pullman-Standard public relations consultant E. Preston Calvert, Pullman-Standard built the shell for the locomotive, and while GM encouraged it to build more shells in the future, "it did not want to get into locomotive building". While still unfinished, the locomotive was publicly displayed at the Fisher Ternstedt plant in Cleveland on April 25, 1947, just a month before the beginning of the Train of Tomorrow's tour.

=== Chair car Star Dust ===
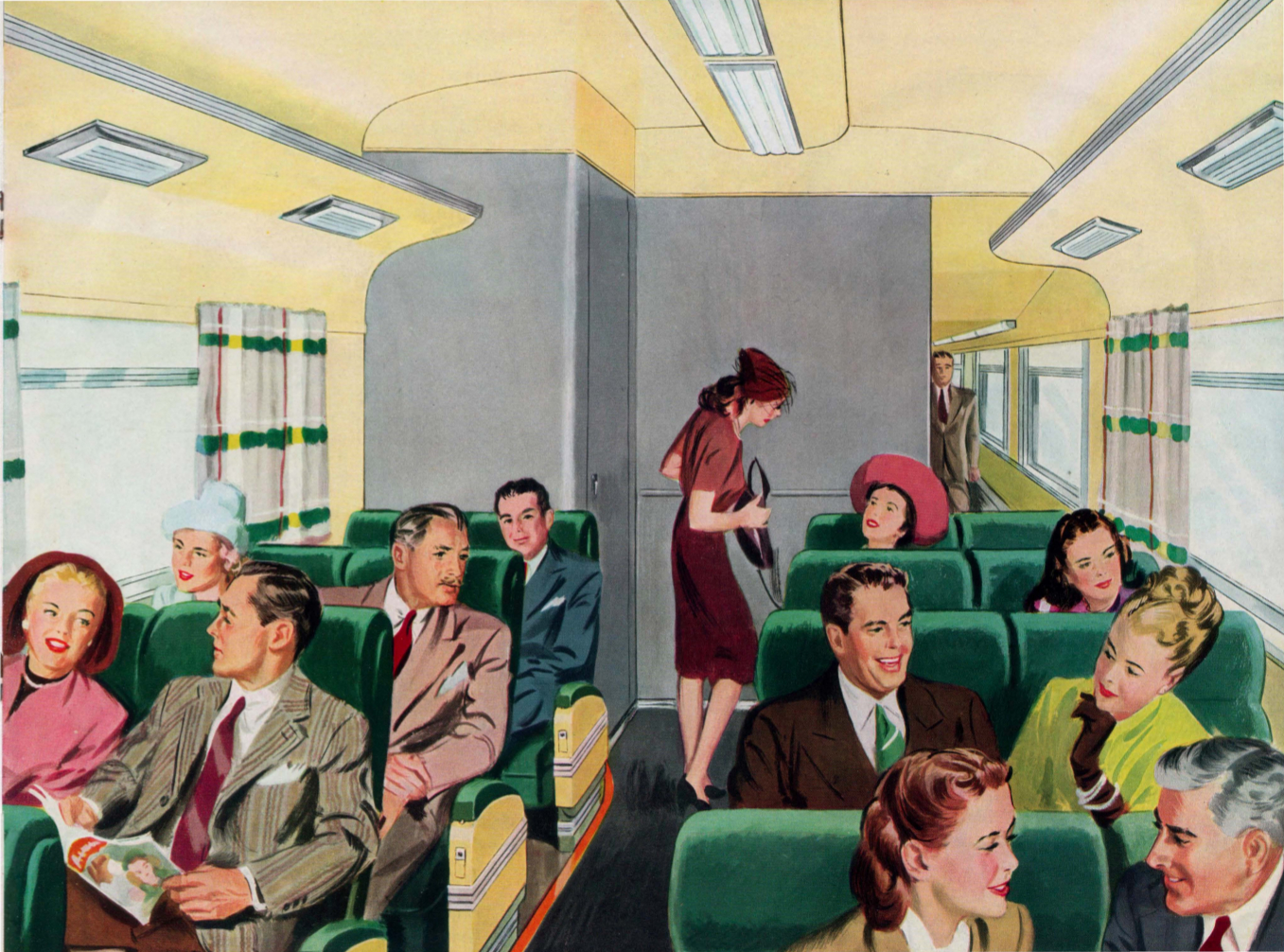
Chair car Star Dust

Chair car Star Dust (Pullman plan number 7555) seated 72 passengers. It provided seating on three levels, including in its Astra-Dome and three semiprivate rooms beneath the dome in addition to on its main level. Its two main level sections, the forward coach section and the rear coach section, seated 16 and 12 passengers each, respectively. The dome sat 24 people, while two of the three semiprivate rooms could accommodate 7 while the third could seat 6. The seats in the car could rotate, allowing them to face the direction of travel or allow two pairs of seats to face each other, allowing families to interact with each other during a trip. The semiprivate rooms were separated from the passageway by shoulder-high partitions, while these three rooms were divided from each other by fluted (or ribbed) glass called Securit Linex Glass that, while it transmitted light, provided some privacy by impairing the ability to see through it. The first and third semiprivate rooms each had two pairs of chairs and a couch that could accommodate three people, while the second contained two of the three-person couches instead. Under the stairway of the dome, the car contained various supplies and necessities, including a water cooler, a coat locker, and a jump seat for the porter. The car had a set of men's and women's lavatories at either end, with the pair at the vestibule end being complemented by men's and women's dressing rooms. Also at the vestibule end, the car had luggage compartments on both sides of the aisle that could be accessed from either inside or outside the train.

=== Dining car Sky View ===
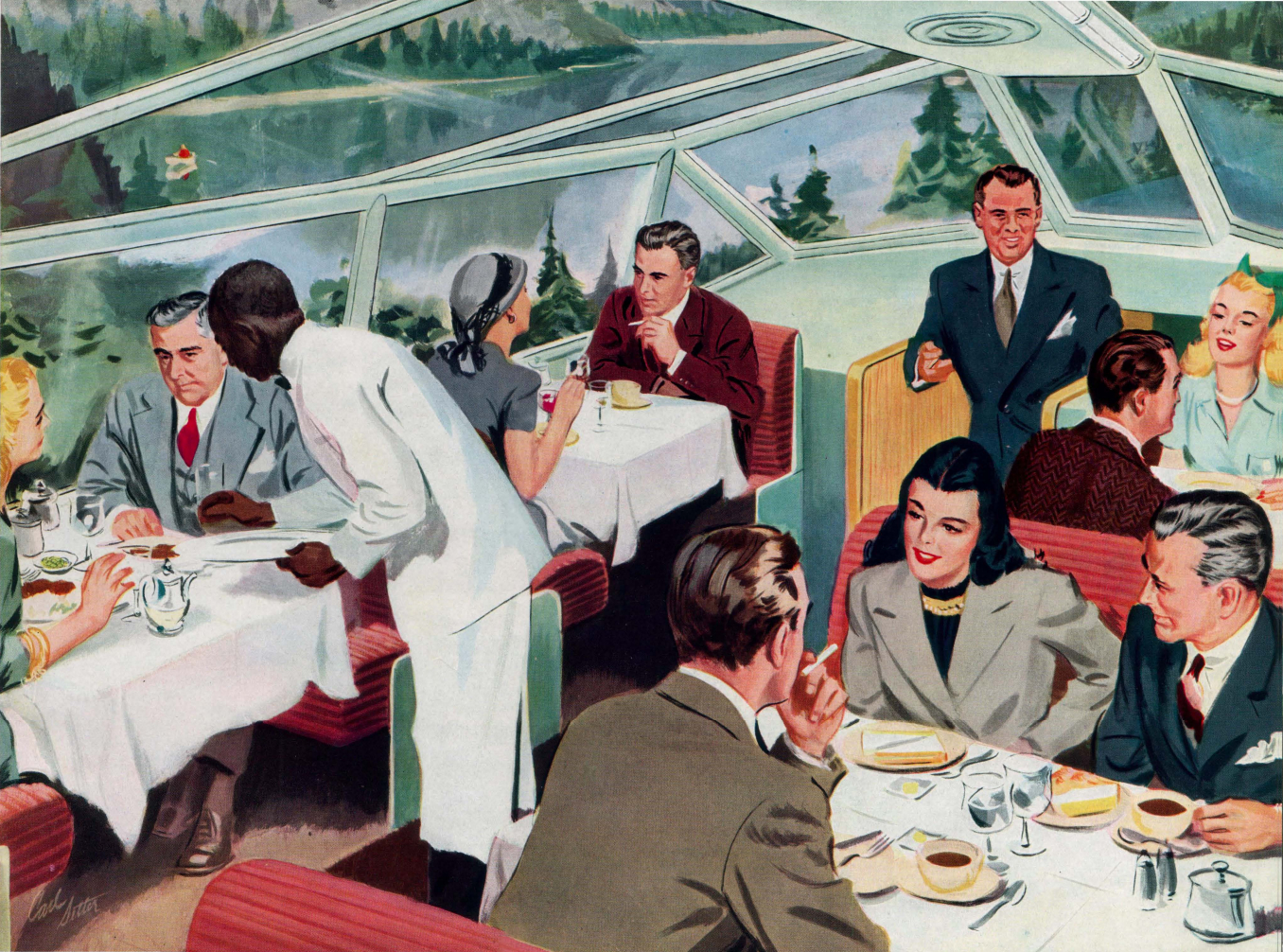
Dining car Sky View

Dining car Sky View (Pullman plan number 7556) could accommodate 52 people in three different dining rooms. It sat 24 in its main dining room, 18 in its dome, and 10 in its reserve private dining room beneath the dome. It was both the first dome diner to be built and the first diner of any kind with an all-electric kitchen. At its front end, the car featured the crew's toilet, an icemaker, and food storage accessible from the kitchen. The kitchen covered roughly the first third of the car, and it was entirely constructed of stainless steel and featured a pan floor made of the anti-slip material Martex. The kitchen featured a wide array of electric appliances, including a frozen food locker, a General Electric (GE) broiler, a GE garbage disposal unit, three GE ranges, a Hobart dishwasher, a hot table, a water heater, a Hotpoint fry kettle, a KitchenAid mixer, three ovens, plate warmers, and Pullman-Standard refrigerators with mechanics made by Frigidaire. The kitchen also featured long counter spaces, a pastry board, a sink, and storage lockers.

Under the dome, and adjoining to the kitchen, was the car's pantry, where salads and desserts were made and where the waiters picked up food for passengers. The pantry also featured a dumbwaiter that connected to the dining room in the dome. Also beneath the dome was the reserve private dining room, a small dining area designed to accommodate small groups or families. It had two tables with two-person benches on either side, as well as two loose chairs that could be added to the ends of the tables to give each a capacity of five people, or ten for the entire room.

In the dome, an off-center aisle allowed for four-person booths on one side and two-person booths on the other. At the front end of the dome was a waiter's station that included the dumbwaiter along with a Cory coffee warmer, an ice well, a refrigerator, a sink, and a toaster. At the base of the staircase to the dome was the steward's room as well as a locker for supplies and a desk. The main dining room also featured an off-center aisle, dividing square tables with four chairs on one side from triangular tables with two chairs on the other. The rear end of the car included a crew locker, an electrical locker, and a linen locker.

=== Sleeping car Dream Cloud ===
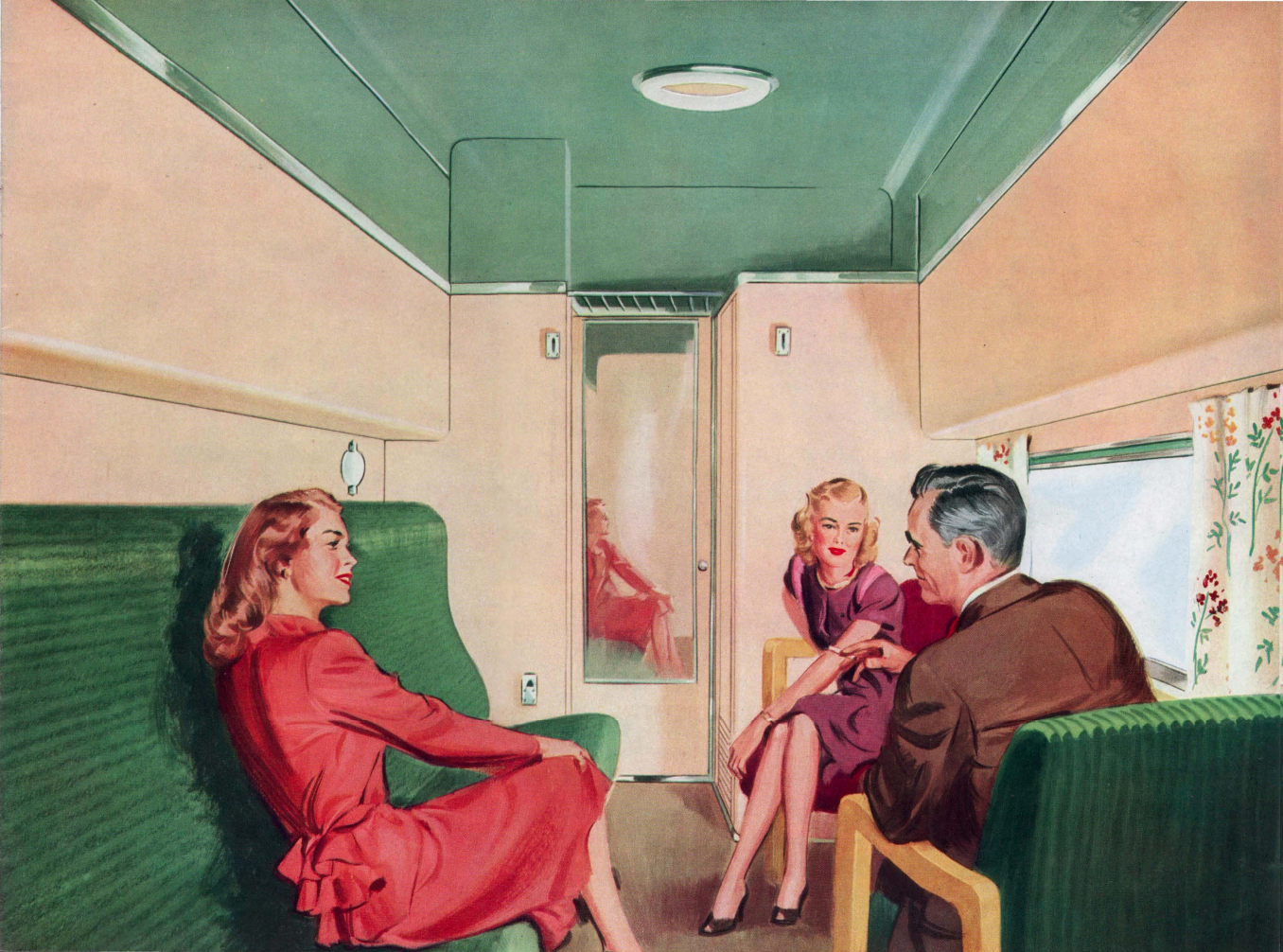
Sleeping car Dream Cloud

Sleeping car Dream Cloud (Pullman plan number 4128) accommodated passengers in two drawing rooms, three compartments, and eight duplex roomettes, and also had 24 seats in its dome. It could sleep 20 passengers if all its beds were filled. All of its berths were mounted lengthwise in regards to the car. At the front of the car was a general use toilet. Next came drawing room E, which featured a large sofa facing the window that folded down into a bed at night, two more upper berths that folded down from the walls, and two chairs near the window. The drawing room also had a small lavatory known as an "annex". The next room, drawing room D, was a mirror image of drawing room E, although the two were decorated differently.

Under the dome roughly in the center of the car were the three compartments, which each had (like the drawing rooms) a window-facing sofa. Compartment C had two lower berths and a single chair, as well as a sanitary column in the corner with a lid-capped "hopper" (toilet) and a fold-down sink. Similarly to drawing rooms E and D, compartments C and D were mirror images of each other, again the only difference being in terms of decor. Compartment A shared its layout with compartment C, although during the Train of Tomorrow's tour it was used as the train's office.

The dome in the car was similar to the other domes on the train, although all of its seats were reserved for passengers booked on Dream Cloud. Behind the staircase to the dome was the porter's section, containing a seat and a folding upper berth as well as an annunciator to alert the porter to sleeping car passengers requesting service and supplies such as a first aid kit. Behind the porter's section were the car's eight duplex roomettes, consisting of two upper roomettes and two lower roomettes on each side of the aisle. The lower roomettes were at floor level, while their upper counterparts were two steps above. The roomettes each featured a seat, a small one-person sofa, a sanitary column with hopper like the ones in the compartments, and one berth. Upper berths were slightly larger than lower berths, and the former had berths that folded out of the wall while the latter had pull-out sliding berths that were stored under the adjacent upper roomette. At the end of the car were two lockers that held clean linen and soiled linen as well as folding chairs and tables.

After being constructed, Dream Cloud was taken to Altoona, Pennsylvania, and subjected to jacking, load, and squeeze testing.

=== Lounge-observation car Moon Glow ===
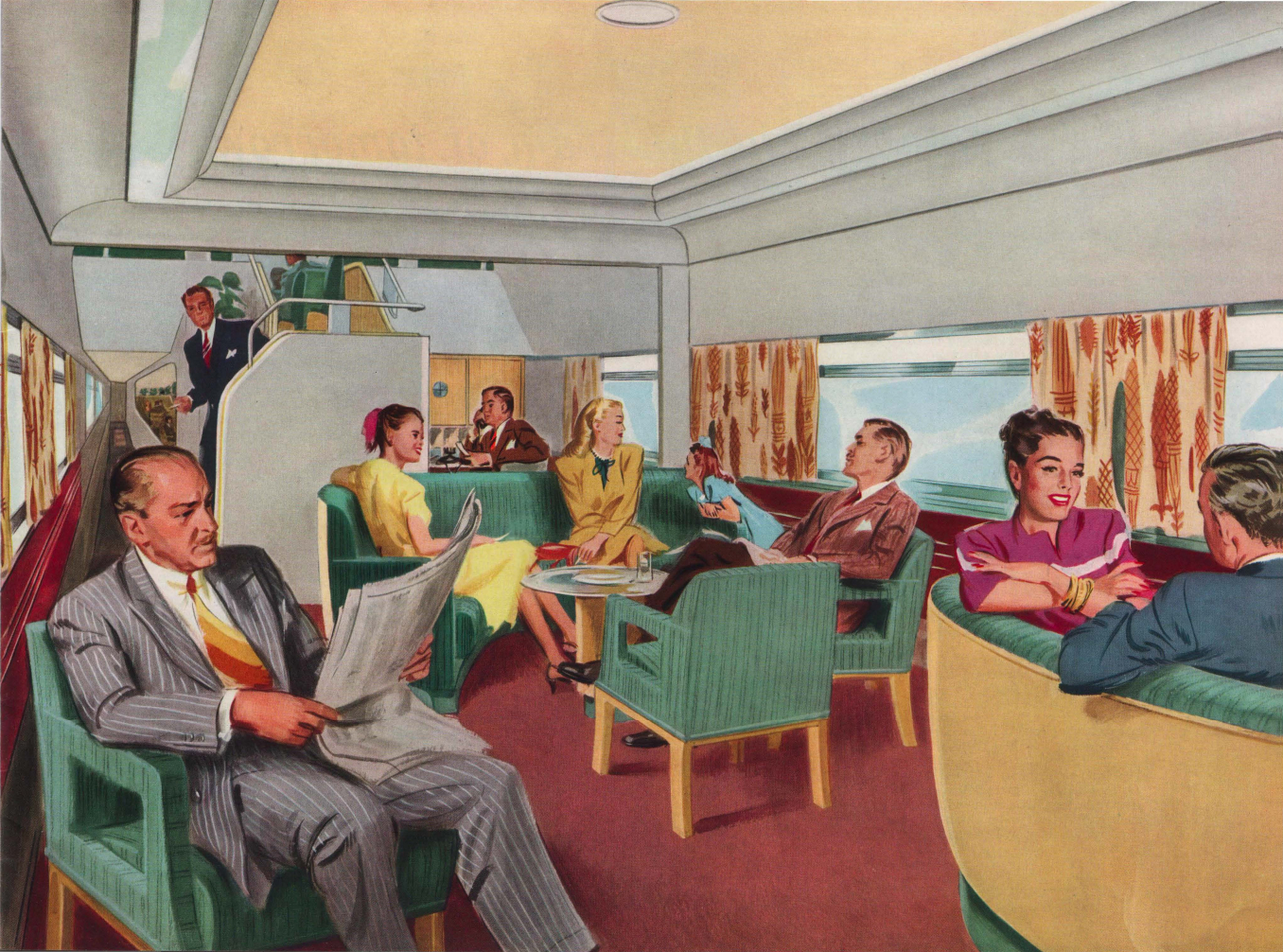
Lounge-observation car Moon Glow

Lounge-observation car Moon Glow (Pullman plan number 7557) could accommodate 68 people in its dome, rear observation lounge, and two cocktail lounges. Half of the seats in the car were movable, enabling passengers to adapt its seating to their needs. The first of the three lounges on the car, at its forward end, was called the upper lounge, the second, which was located under the dome, was called the lower lounge, and the rear lounge at the end of the car was called the observation lounge. The front end of the car also housed a men's and a women's lavatory. The upper lounge featured a bar, a large sofa, built-in seats, three booths with Formica tabletops, and smoking stands also capable of holding beverages.

The lower lounge also featured a built-in sofa and chairs, but they were finished with honey-colored leather that complemented the dark green carpet to give it "the appearance of a bar in a private club". Unlike the upper lounge, the lower lounge did not have any windows. The lower lounge also featured a bar created by Angelo Colonna that contained a refrigerator and an ice cube maker, glassware cabinets, and a cigar and cigarette humidor. Like in the kitchen in the dining car, the bar's floor was a "metal pan" finished in anti-slip Martex. Both of these lounge areas were separated from the passageway by half-wall partitions.

The dome of Moon Glow, like the domes in the chair car and sleeping car, accommodated 24 people. At the base of the stairs to the dome was a built-in writing desk area, which contained cubicles for writing supplies, the public address system, an intratrain telephone, and a "train-to-shore" radiotelephone that could be operated whenever the train was within 25 miles (40 km) of the 30 largest metropolitan areas in the United States. The radiotelephone was powered by a six-volt battery similar to automotive batteries that was mounted under the car, and it used an 18-inch (46 cm) "piano wire" antenna mounted to the roof, both of which were supplied by Illinois Bell.

The observation lounge at the end of the car had an oval-shaped appearance, with a rounded end in its ceiling lighting cove matching the rounded shape of the end of the car. The observation lounge included nine movable lounge chairs, as well as three sofas: two kidney-shaped ones (seating two and three people, respectively) that could also be moved, and a third large, curved, built-in sofa. The sofas and chairs were turned toward the windows while the train was in motion, but during tours they were turned inward. There was a table in front of the built-in sofa, and smoking stands throughout, like those in the other lounges. The windows in the observation lounge were large, and almost appeared to be pillarless, but small pillars were hidden behind drapes. The windows also had shades. The very end of the observation car contained a "cockpit area" with built-in end tables and built-in seats, and (hidden behind a door) a back-up and signal valve that could be used to control the train while it was being operated in reverse.

== Operation ==
=== Testing and dedication ===
The Train of Tomorrow made its first test run on the Monon Railroad, between Chicago and Wallace Junction in Indiana. The train also made its official debut on the Monon on May 26, 1947, carrying company officials, members of the media and invited guests 278 miles (447 km) from Dearborn Station in Chicago to the French Lick Springs Hotel in French Lick, Indiana. After spending the night at the hotel in French Lick, and hosting 758 people who toured the train while there, the train and its passengers returned to Chicago the next day. The train's public debut also served as a shakedown of sorts, with several brake tests being made on the return journey. The return to Chicago was marred by a collision with an automobile at a grade crossing, although it resulted in no injuries and no serious damage to the locomotive.

On May 28 the Train of Tomorrow was dedicated at a ceremony held at the Palmer House Hotel that featured Chicago mayor Martin H. Kennelly and GM's Charles F. Kettering, Cyrus Osborn, and Alfred P. Sloan. Approximately 1,000 GM and Pullman-Standard executives, businessmen and politicians attended the ceremony, during which Kettering's granddaughter, Jane, christening the train with a bottle of champagne. Following this ceremony, GM opened the train to the public at Soldier Field between May 29 and June 1, during which around 50,000 people saw it.

=== Demonstration tour ===
The Train of Tomorrow departed on its demonstration tour on June 2, 1947, barnstorming the United States and Canada for 28 months and covering 65,000 miles (105,000 km), despite the tour initially being slated to last only 6 months. In the words of author Brian Solomon, the intention of the tour was to "promote Diesel-electric technology and new concepts in passenger railroading". According to Dolzall and Dolzall, the chief purpose of the Train of Tomorrow's tour was to generate public interest and to sell orders for GM Diesel-electric locomotives and Pullman-Standard passenger cars.

The tour was made possible by volunteers and employees of GM, its various divisions, Pullman-Standard, and the various railroads over which the train ran, and it was dependent on advance agents to coordinate logistics and public relations personnel to promote the train. The barnstorming tour included special runs for the press, tours for groups of children as well as the general public, and open houses at GM plants for employees and their families. GM employees on the tour were accommodated in local hotels, while the Pullman crew staffing the train itself slept in a remodeled heavyweight Pullman-Standard car nicknamed the Blue Goose that accompanied the Train of Tomorrow. Pullman was responsible for staffing the train as well as cleaning and maintaining it, while EMD was in charge of supervising its maintenance. On a typical day on the road, the train was cleaned and prepared during the morning, then local VIPs (such as politicians) and GM executives were invited to have lunch on the train's dining car, and public tours would begin at 1 or 2 pm and run until 9 pm. During tours, the public would typically enter the train through the rear of lounge-observation car Moon Glow and exit through chair car Star Dust. Throughout the tour, the train's interior was decorated with anthuriums, rare flowers that were sourced from a single florist and flown in.

On June 3, 1947, the Train of Tomorrow departed on its "1st Eastern Tour", stopping for multiple days in Detroit, Michigan; Pittsburgh, Pennsylvania; Atlantic City, New Jersey; Baltimore, Maryland; Atlanta, Georgia; Louisville, Kentucky; Cincinnati, Ohio, Dayton, Ohio, and Oxford, Ohio, before returning to Chicago on August 11. On August 20, it departed on its "2nd Eastern Tour", stopping for multiple days at Cleveland, Ohio, and Buffalo, New York, before August 31. Between September 1 and September 8, it visited Eastern Canada for the first time when it was exhibited at the Canadian National Exhibition in Toronto and visited McKinnon Industries in St. Catharines, Ontario. On September 8, the train reentered the United States, and stopped for multiple days in Rochester, Syracuse, and Albany, New York; Boston, Massachusetts; New York City, New York; and Philadelphia, Pennsylvania, before returning to Chicago on October 17. From October 24 to 26, the train was exhibited at the EMD plant in La Grange, Illinois, but on October 25 it made a trip to Ann Arbor, Michigan, for an Associated Press trip to the football game between the University of Minnesota and the University of Michigan. On October 27, the train departed on its "Western Tour", spending multiple days in Omaha, Nebraska; Denver, Colorado; Salt Lake City, Utah; Oakland, San Francisco, and Los Angeles, California; Portland, Oregon; and Seattle, Washington, before the end of the year. On December 16, the train made a "celebrity run" between the Californian cities of Glendale and Saugus, with Eddie Bracken, Gordon "Wild Bill" Elliot, Jean Hersholt, Herbert Marshall, Joan Leslie, Art Linkletter, Walter Pidgeon, Ginger Rogers, and Ann Sothern on board. On December 28, in the lead-up to the 1948 Rose Bowl, the train took the Michigan Wolverines football team on a trip, also from Glendale to Saugus, before picking up the Michigan Marching Band in San Francisco and returning with them to Glendale the following day.

On January 1, 1948, the Train of Tomorrow took the USC Trojans football team from Santa Barbara to the Rose Bowl. In early January, the train resumed its Western tour, stopping for multiple days in San Diego, California; Phoenix, Arizona; El Paso, Dallas, San Antonio, Fort Worth, and Houston, Texas; New Orleans, Louisiana; Miami, Tampa, and Orlando, Florida; Montgomery, Alabama; Memphis, Tennessee; Little Rock, Arkansas; Oklahoma City and Tulsa, Oklahoma; Wichita and Topeka, Kansas; Kansas City and St. Louis, Missouri; Minneapolis–Saint Paul, Minnesota; Milwaukee, Wisconsin; and Des Moines, Iowa, before returning to Chicago on May 10. On January 11, between Phoenix and Albuquerque, New Mexico, the train was given permission by Santa Fe to try to attain its maximum speed, which the crew clocked at 138 miles per hour (222 km/h), although the locomotive's speedometer only registered 118.5 miles per hour (190.7 km/h). On February 2, the train met the original Freedom Train in Waco, Texas. Upon arriving in Tulsa, on March 24, it was welcomed by members of the Otoe tribe. After a "shopping period" in May, the Train of Tomorrow resumed touring on May 30, stopping for multiple days in Danville and Anderson, Illinois; Indianapolis, Indiana; and Grand Rapids, Lansing, Flint, and Saginaw, Michigan, before returning to Chicago for the Chicago Railroad Fair on July 19. On July 16, the train visited the only automobile dealership on its itinerary, Lee Anderson's Chevrolet showroom in Lake Orion, Michigan, just north of Detroit. Between July 20 and September 24, the train was put on display at the Chicago Railroad Fair. On September 25, the train left for touring again, spending days in Detroit and Pontiac, Michigan; Toledo, Warren, Columbus, Dayton, and Elyria, Ohio; Buffalo, Lockport and Elmsford, New York; Framingham, Massachusetts; Meriden and Bristol, Connecticut; and Baltimore, Maryland, before arriving in St. Louis for servicing at the Pullman shops there on December 14.

On January 15, 1949, the Train of Tomorrow departed on its "Southeastern Tour", spending multiple days in Wilmington, Charlotte, Raleigh, and Portsmouth, North Carolina; Columbia, Spartanburg and Charleston, South Carolina; Augusta and Macon, Georgia; St. Petersburg, Tallahassee, and Pensacola, Florida; Nashville and Chattanooga, Tennessee; Huntington and Wheeling, West Virginia; Lexington, Kentucky; Elmira, Binghamton, and Poughkeepsie, New York; Scranton, Pennsylvania; Providence, Rhode Island; Manchester, New Hampshire; Portland, Maine; Worcester and Springfield, Massachusetts; Hartford, Connecticut; Canton and Akron, Ohio; Fort Wayne, South Bend, and Evansville, Indiana; Springfield and Peoria, Illinois; and Davenport, Iowa, before arriving in St. Louis on June 9 for a "shopping period" before the 1949 Chicago Railroad Fair. On January 17, it set a new speed record between Detroit and New York City, reaching a top speed of 102 miles per hour (164 km/h) and completing the trip in 12 hours, 114 minutes faster than the previous fastest time. Between June 25 and October 2, the train was displayed at the Chicago Railroad Fair. It made its second trip to Eastern Canada between September 22 and October 30, visiting London, Ottawa, Oshawa, Toronto, Hamilton, St. Catharines, Stratford, Chatham and Windsor, Ontario, as well as Montreal, Quebec City and Sherbrooke, Quebec. On October 30, the last trip of the tour took the train from Windsor through Detroit back to Dearborn Station in Chicago, from where its first public trip departed, where it was serviced before being placed in temporary storage.

In total, while on tour the Train of Tomorrow visited 181 cities and towns, covered over 65,000 miles (105,000 km), was ridden or toured by over 5.7 million people, and was seen by an estimated 20 million people. Various sources estimate the cost of the tour as $1–2 million.

=== Sale and revenue service ===
GM initially intended to sell the Train of the Tomorrow to the highest bidder in 1947, after completing its originally planned six-month tour. On October 17, 1949, Osborn received a memorandum suggesting that GM ask for $950,000 for the whole train, including the locomotive, as GM was very keen to sell the whole train as a unit, with any amount offered over the asking price being donated to charity. On October 21, Osborn sent a letter to 29 railroad presidents offering them the opportunity to buy the train. Due to the short length of the Train of Tomorrow and its lack of an identical second train (which would be needed to effectively run an overnight service), purchasing the train was not practical for many railroads, many of which also simply did not have enough capital to make such a purchase. While Osborn's letter asked for all bids to be made to EMD by December 1, the train remained unsold by that date. On March 18, 1950, in an internal memorandum to the railroad's executive committee, Union Pacific president A. E. Stoddard recommended purchasing the train for $500,000 and spending another $100,000 on refurbishing it and miscellaneous costs, with the intention of putting it into service between Portland and Seattle. According to the memorandum, GM had received a number of bids for the train but was willing to sell it for $500,000, which according to Morgan meant that "either all the bids were lower or the other bidders were after individual pieces of the equipment and EMD decided not to sell cars individually." On March 21, the Union Pacific Executive Council officially approved Stoddard's proposal to buy the train.

After taking delivery of the Train of Tomorrow in April 1950, the Union Pacific repainted the exterior of the train in its livery, refurbished the entire interior and mounted a large taillight to the roof of Moon Glow, the lounge-observation car. In May, the train went on a tour of the Union Pacific system with an emphasis on the Pacific Northwest, as the railroad had already decided that the train would be put into service between Portland and Seattle. On June 18, it began service as part of Train 457, which departed Portland northbound at 8 am and arrived in Seattle at 1:05 pm, laying over there for nearly four hours before departing southbound as Train 458 at 5 pm and arriving in Portland by 9:30 pm. The entire consist of Train 457 and Train 458 was typically three EMD E7 locomotives, a mail-baggage car, five or six chair cars (which could each accommodate 44 passengers), a parlor car, a through sleeper car for the City of Portland, and then the four dome cars from the Train of Tomorrow together at the rear of the train. Throughout the existence of Train 457 and Train 458, numerous adjustments were made to their schedules and times, beginning with a shortening of the 182-mile (293 km) route to 3 hours and 59 minutes by August 13. In 1950, a round-trip fare cost $6.84, and the fare for the same trip in the parlor car or a reserved seat in the sleeping car Dream Cloud cost $15.65 ($2.64 cheaper than a round-trip flight between the two cities on a Douglas DC-6, according to a contemporary magazine).

In March 1956, the Union Pacific renumbered three of the cars (all but the sleeper Dream Cloud), while in December 1958 dome observation car Moon Glow was reclassified as a dome lounge car and, in 1959, had its rounded end cut off and squared for use in mid-train service, typically next to the dining car as a convenient place for passengers to wait for a table. In February 1961, dining car Sky View was the first Train of Tomorrow car to be retired, followed by sleeping car Dream Cloud in February 1964, chair car Star Dust in November 1964, and Moon Glow in March 1965. Although initially noted as "vacant but not dismantled" by the Union Pacific, all four cars were eventually sold to McCarty's Scrap Yard in Pocatello, Idaho. The EMD demonstrator locomotive that originally pulled the Train of Tomorrow was renumbered 988 by the Union Pacific and put into general service, separated from the four dome cars it toured with. It was sent back to EMD in 1965 and either rebuilt as an EMD E9A that was subsequently renumbered 912 or traded in on a new E9A; the records of EMD and the Union Pacific do not clearly indicate which occurred.

== Fate and legacy ==
While Star Dust, Dream Cloud, and Sky View were ultimately scrapped in 1964 at McCarty's Scrap Yard in Pocatello, Moon Glow survived. In 1969, after purchasing the lot next to McCarty's Scrap Yard and opening Henry's Scrap Metals on it, Henry Fernandez purchased Moon Glow from McCarty's for $2,500, without knowing its history or the story of the Train of Tomorrow. He intended to restore it and convert it into an office, although it would sit unrestored on his property for 18 years. After members of the National Railway Historical Society (NRHS) discovered it while on a fan trip to the Union Pacific shops and yard in Pocatello in June 1980, they asked Fernandez to donate the car to them, but he refused. After learning the history of the car, Fernandez placed a high value on it when asked about a sale or donation by the NRHS for a second time in June 1981. In 1984, after he decided to close his scrap yard due to difficulties with the Internal Revenue Service, Fernandez authorized the sale of the car to the Promontory Chapter of the NRHS for $138,000 on December 27, 1984, which was finalized on February 1, 1985.

Shortly thereafter, the Ogden Union Station Museum agreed to take possession of Moon Glow and restore it. The car was first moved to a siding behind an insulation company in Pocatello, about 0.25 miles (0.40 km) from Henry's Scrap Metals, in February 1987. In early 1988, the Union Pacific moved Moon Glow from Pocatello to Ogden, Utah, via flatbed car. Between 1991 and 2001, the car was moved to various locations in and around Ogden for storage and a variety of refurbishment, which included sandblasting, the application of primer paint, and replacement glass for its windows that were purchased with $125,000 granted by the Utah State Legislature. In December 2004, the Sci Fi channel film Alien Express was in part filmed in Moon Glow; the car was cleaned and temporarily furnished by the film crew, which also paid $4,000 to the Ogden Union Station Foundation to use the car. By 2012, Moon Glow was, in the words of Ogden's Standard-Examiner, likely "condemned to rust away". The car was suffering from widespread rust after sitting outside for several years; had its siding removed for safekeeping and subsequently lost; had many of its windows either broken or removed; and had been targeted by metal thieves. An estimated US$3 million was needed to restore it.
