= Le Sabre =

Le Sabre (sometimes contracted LeSabre, and French for "the sable"), may refer to:

- Buick LeSabre, an American-made General Motors full-size car, manufactured 1959–2005
- General Motors Le Sabre, a 1951 concept car
- Le Sabre SA, a French television production company affiliated with Canal+, and co-producers of Starhunter
