= Buick XP-300 =

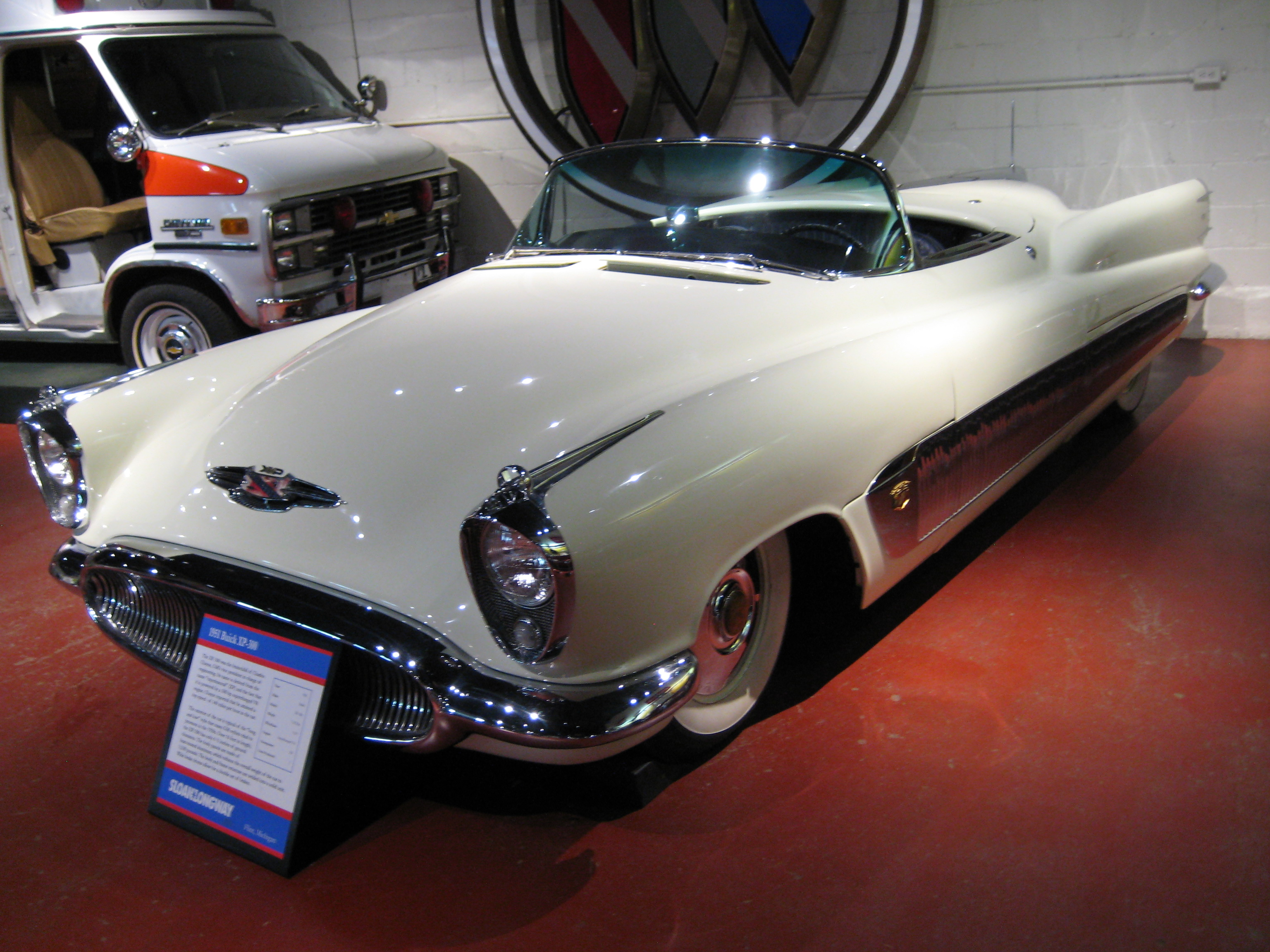
- Buick XP-300 at the Alfred P. Sloan Museum in Flint, Michigan

Overview
- Manufacturer: General Motors
- Production: 1951
- Designer: Charles Chayne; Ned F. Nickles

Body and chassis
- Class: Concept car

Powertrain
- Engine: 335-horsepower (250 kW) supercharged V8 engine
- Transmission: Dynaflow automatic transmission

Dimensions
- Wheelbase: 116 in (2,946 mm)
- Length: 192.5 in (4,890 mm)
- Width: 80 in (2,032 mm)
- Height: 53.4 in (1,356 mm)
- Curb weight: 3,125 lb (1,417 kg)

The Buick XP-300 (initially designated the XP-9) is a concept car created by General Motors in 1951. It is a counterpart to GM's Le Sabre concept, with which it shares many mechanical components, including its supercharged V8 engine, which could run on either gasoline or methanol. The XP-300 is representative of GM's "long and low" design philosophy in the 1950s, and includes numerous innovative features ranging from push-button power windows and seats to hydraulic jacks and de Dion axles.

Claimed to have attained a top speed of 140 mph (230 km/h) during testing, the XP-300 was displayed at auto shows across the United States, including the Chicago Auto Show in February 1951 and GM's 1953 Motorama tour. Together with the Le Sabre, the XP-300 pioneered the wraparound windshield, although it ultimately had much less influence on future car design than its counterpart. In 1966, the XP-300 was refurbished and donated to the Alfred P. Sloan Museum in Flint, Michigan, where it remains as of 2018.

== Background ==
The XP-300, which was initially designated the XP-9, was designed by General Motors (GM) vice president of engineering Charles Chayne, along with Ned F. Nickles. Chayne had previously assisted Harley Earl in designing the 1938-39 Buick Y-Job, often regarded as the first concept car. In May 1951, Chayne granted approval for construction of the XP-300 along with a counterpart GM concept car, the Le Sabre.

== Design ==
The XP-300 features a wraparound windshield, three tailfins, and a grille that resembles an electric razor. It also includes push-button power windows and seats. Although somewhat similar in appearance to the Le Sabre, the XP-300's styling was noticeably cleaner than the more futuristic, rocket-inspired lines of its counterpart. Furthermore, while the Le Sabre generally reflected Earl's design philosophy, the XP-300 was more in line with Chayne's conception of the future of Buick production cars, and its front end design ultimately foreshadowed the 1954 Buick line. The car's name reflects the fact that it produced over 300 horsepower (220 kW) and was an experimental (XP) vehicle in nature.

== Body ==
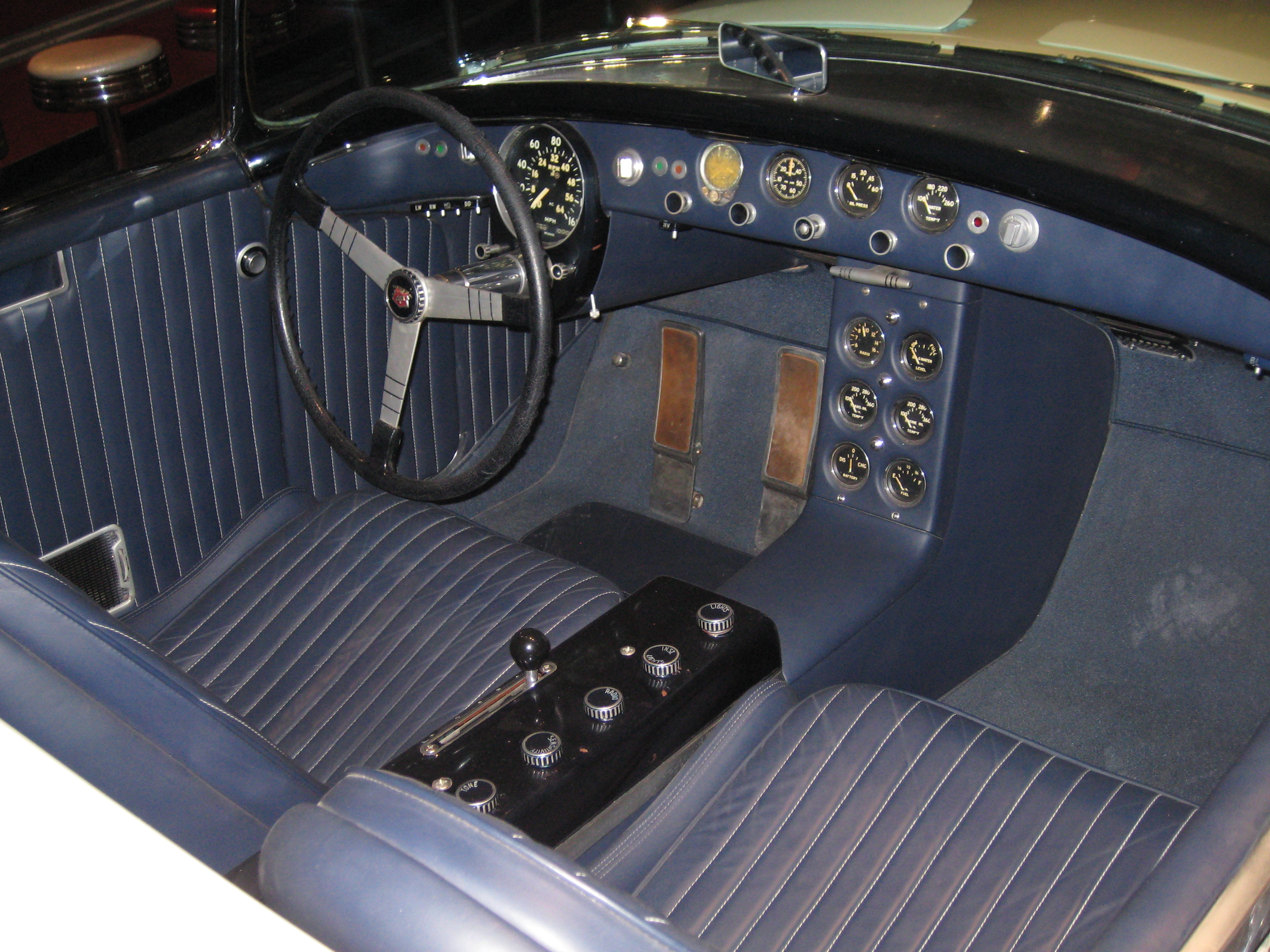
Buick XP-300 interior

The XP-300's body and frame were welded together into a single unit. It shares many common mechanical components with the Le Sabre. Representative of GM's "long and low" design philosophy in the 1950s, the XP-300 measures over 16 feet (4,900 mm) in total length and has a 116-inch (2,946 mm) wheelbase with just 6.6 inches (168 mm) of ground clearance. The car is 53.4 inches (1,356 mm) in height and 80 inches (2,032 mm) in width. Weighing in at 3,125 pounds (1,417 kg), the total weight of the car was reduced by its use of heat-treated, aluminum body panels.

The car also features relatively heavy and wide drum brakes that necessitated two sets of brake shoes for each wheel. In addition, it boasts hydraulic steel bars that made it more rigid while being driven, helping form a framework somewhat similar to a roll cage; similarly, four hydraulic jacks that could raise either the driver or passenger side of the car facilitated easier tire changes. The XP-300 also has de Dion axles based on a Daimler-Benz design used for Grand Prix race cars. It additionally features four coil springs and a hydraulic system more complex than that of the Le Sabre, which operates the car's cowl vents, door-locking devices, hood, jacks, seats, and windows.

The car was painted "Venus White". It has functional chrome louvers running down its rocker panels; the forward-mounted louvers served to vent heat from the engine, while the aft ones allowed air to enter the passenger compartment. Similarly, a chrome fin runs through the center of the car's trunk, hiding hinges for the twin deck lids, while a floodlight-style, sealed-beam backup lamp was mounted in the central fixture, which imitates the exhaust of a jet engine. The car was originally built with both a folding convertible top and a hardtop that were interchangeable, although the hardware to mount the latter has been removed and the hardtop can no longer be used.

The interior of the XP-300 features pleated blue-leather bucket seats with adjustable inflatable air bladders and a center console. The car also has a telescoping steering wheel and an instrument panel displaying a prominently mounted combined speedometer/tachometer as well as a fuel gauge. It also boasted numerous technologies considered safety features in 1951, including its dual brakes, adjustable seats, and adjustable steering wheel in addition to seat belts.

== Engine ==
The XP-300 was powered by a supercharged V8 engine made of aluminum that weighed just 550 pounds (249 kg) yet produced 335 horsepower (250 kW). This engine is 250 pounds (113 kg) lighter than the engine used in the contemporary production Buick Roadmaster, but is twice as powerful. The XP-300's engine could run on either gasoline or methanol, and the car featured two separate fuel fillers and fuel tanks, one for each fuel. The engine was fitted with a Bendix-Eclipse two-barrel carburetor, with one using gasoline and the other methanol. The methanol carburetor automatically cut in once the gasoline carburetor reached 40% throttle, in order to prevent engine knocking during rapid acceleration.

With a displacement of just 215.7 cubic inches (3.535 L), the engine, which also powered the Le Sabre, had an impressive power-to-size ratio for the era. It also boasted a chain-driven camshaft and hemispherical combustion chambers, the latter of which allowed it to achieve an air-to-fuel-mixture ratio of 10.0:1, also considerable for 1951. The engine features rocker arms that were mounted transversely on its intake valves but in a fore/aft position for the exhaust valves, which made it more compact and allowed easier installation into the car. It is mated to a custom Dynaflow automatic transmission.

== Testing and touring ==
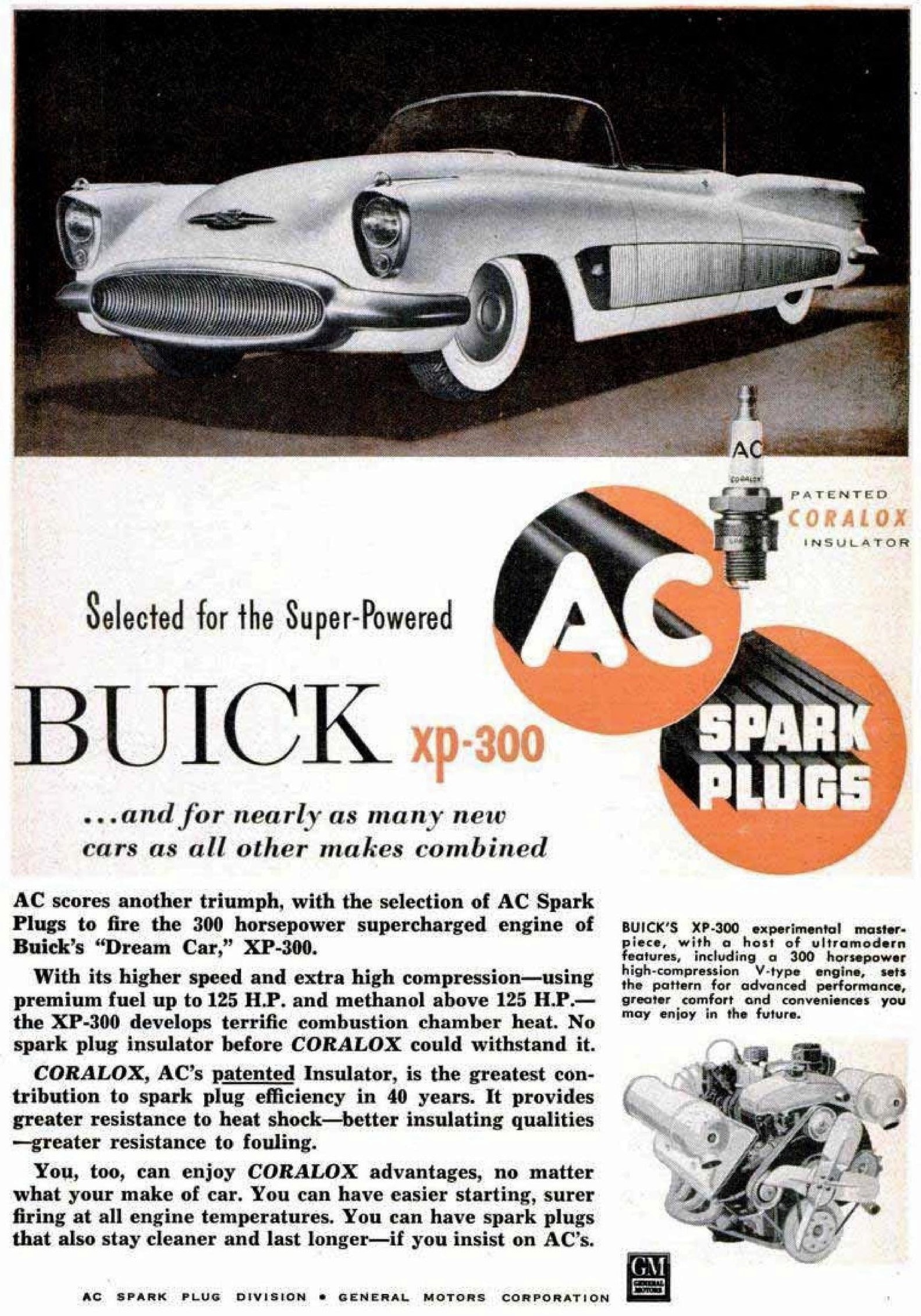
AC Spark Plugs magazine advertisement featuring the XP-300

During testing, Chayne claimed that the XP-300 achieved a top speed of 140 miles per hour (230 km/h) in the hands of Buick general manager Ivan Wiles. Chayne also used the car personally, and reached at least 110 mph (180 km/h) in it himself.

The XP-300 was displayed at auto shows across the United States, where it became a popular fixture with attendees as well as the press. It was displayed at the Chicago Auto Show in February 1951, despite not yet being completely finished. Later that year, it was displayed at the GM Proving Grounds alongside the Le Sabre. The two cars were then displayed together during GM's 1953 Motorama tour. During its unveiling in Santa Ana, California, Chayne called the car "undoubtedly the safest, most comfortable, high-performance car on the road today". The XP-300 accumulated nearly 10,400 miles (16,700 km) of driving, although it did not drive as far as the more publicized Le Sabre. The XP-300 was also insured for $1 million.

== Legacy ==
Together with the Le Sabre, the XP-300 pioneered the wraparound windshield. While the XP-300 inspired the design of the front and upper quarter panels of 1953 and 1954 Buicks, and the headlight styling, wraparound windshield, and adjustable front seats of the 1954 Buick line, it ultimately had much less influence on future car design than the Le Sabre. The Le Sabre, on the other hand, inspired the tailfins on 1953 and 1954 Pontiacs as well as 1957 Cadillacs, the gull-wing bumpers on various Cadillacs, and even European designs such as the Spohn-bodied Veritas and the ZIS-112.

In 1966, the XP-300 was refurbished and donated to the Alfred P. Sloan Museum in Flint, Michigan. In 1985, it was at the Sloan Museum alongside the 1956 Buick Centurion, Buick Wildcat II, Buick Y-Job, Cadillac Cyclone, and General Motors Le Sabre. In 1991, it was exhibited at the Museum of Transportation in Brookline, Massachusetts, along with four other GM cars. As of 2018, it was on display at the Sloan Museum, along with four other Buick concept cars.

== Sources ==
- Temple, David W. (2015). Motorama: GM's Legendary Show & Concept Cars. CarTech, Inc. ISBN 978-1-61325-159-1.
