= Sloan Museum =

Museum

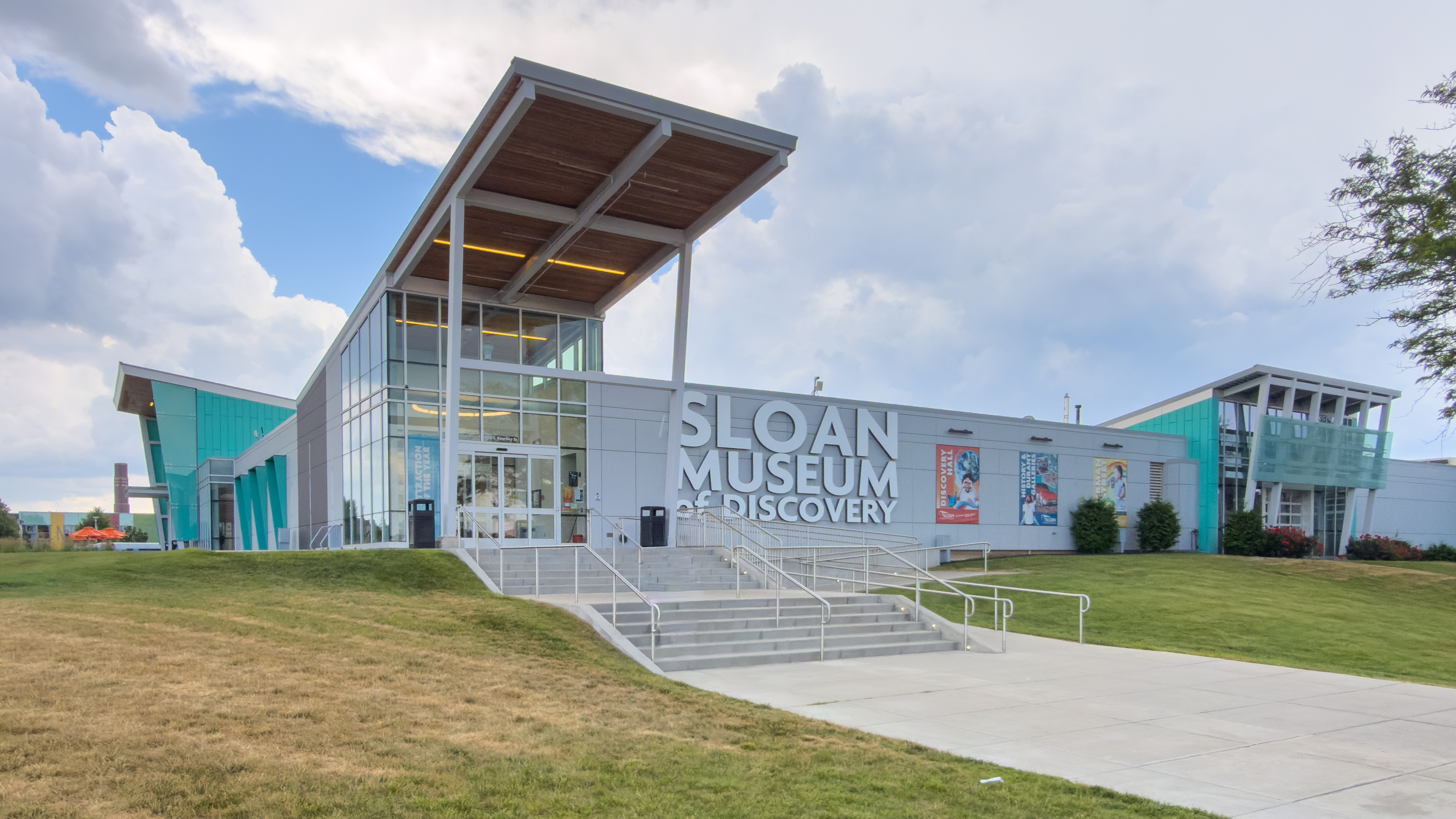
- Sloan Museum in 2026
- Established: 2021
- Location: 1221 East Kearsley Street, Flint, Michigan
- Coordinates: 43.0232°N 83.6789°W
- Website: sloanlongway.org/sloan

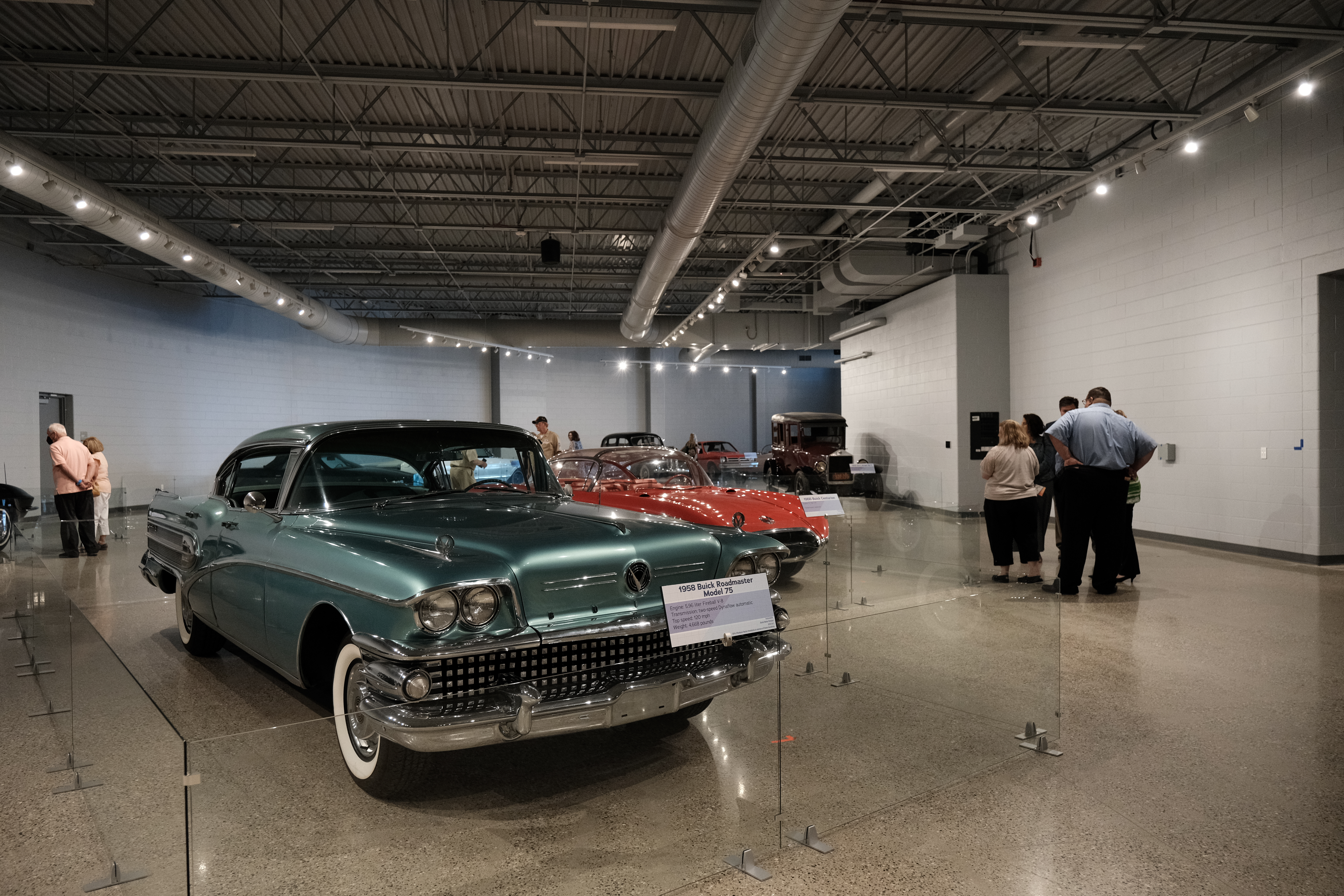
Durant Vehicle Gallery in Sloan Museum of Discovery, showcasing 15 of Sloan's 106 rare and historic vehicle collection

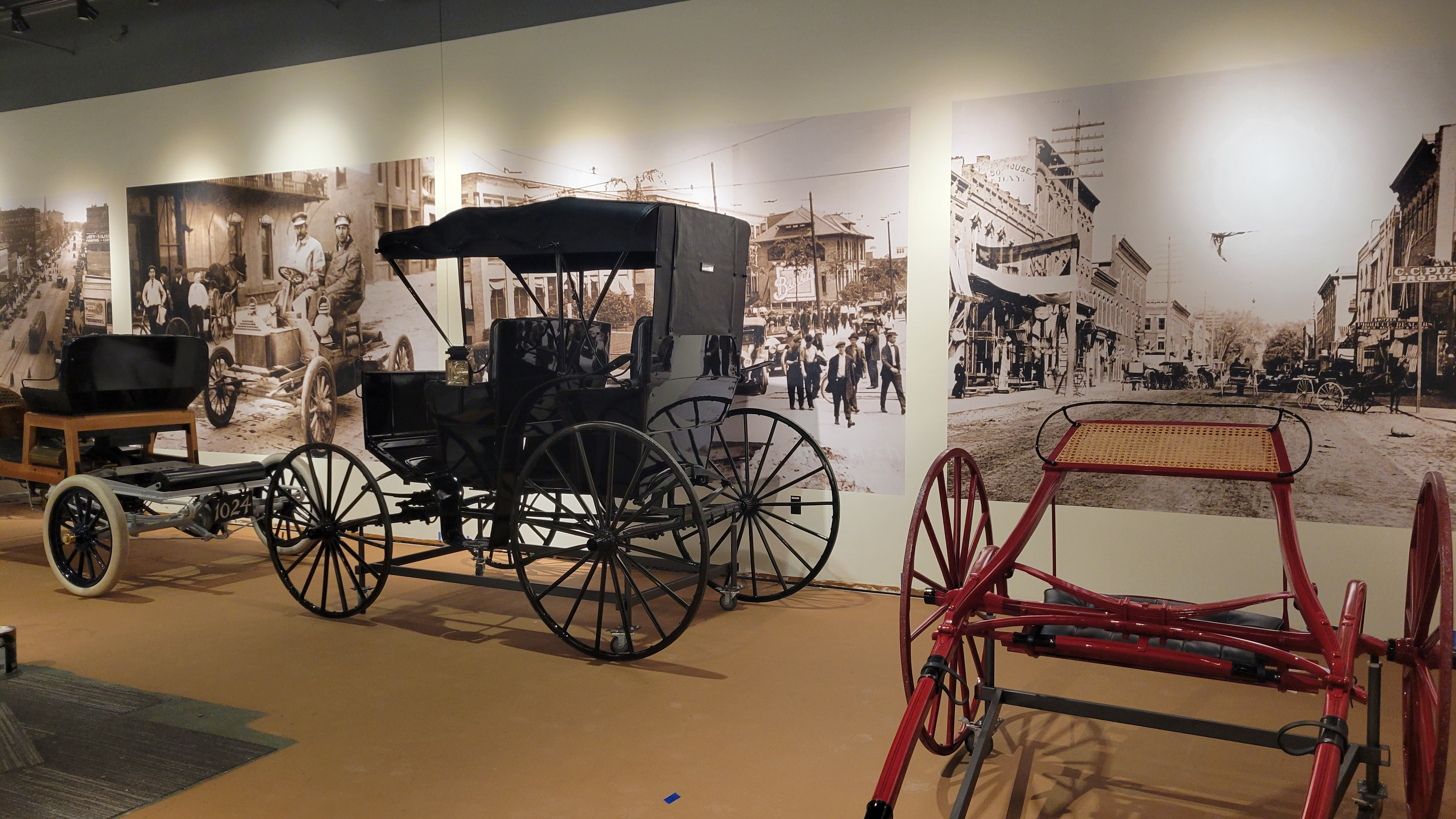
First vehicles produced in early 1900s as exhibited in the History Gallery of Sloan Museum of Discovery

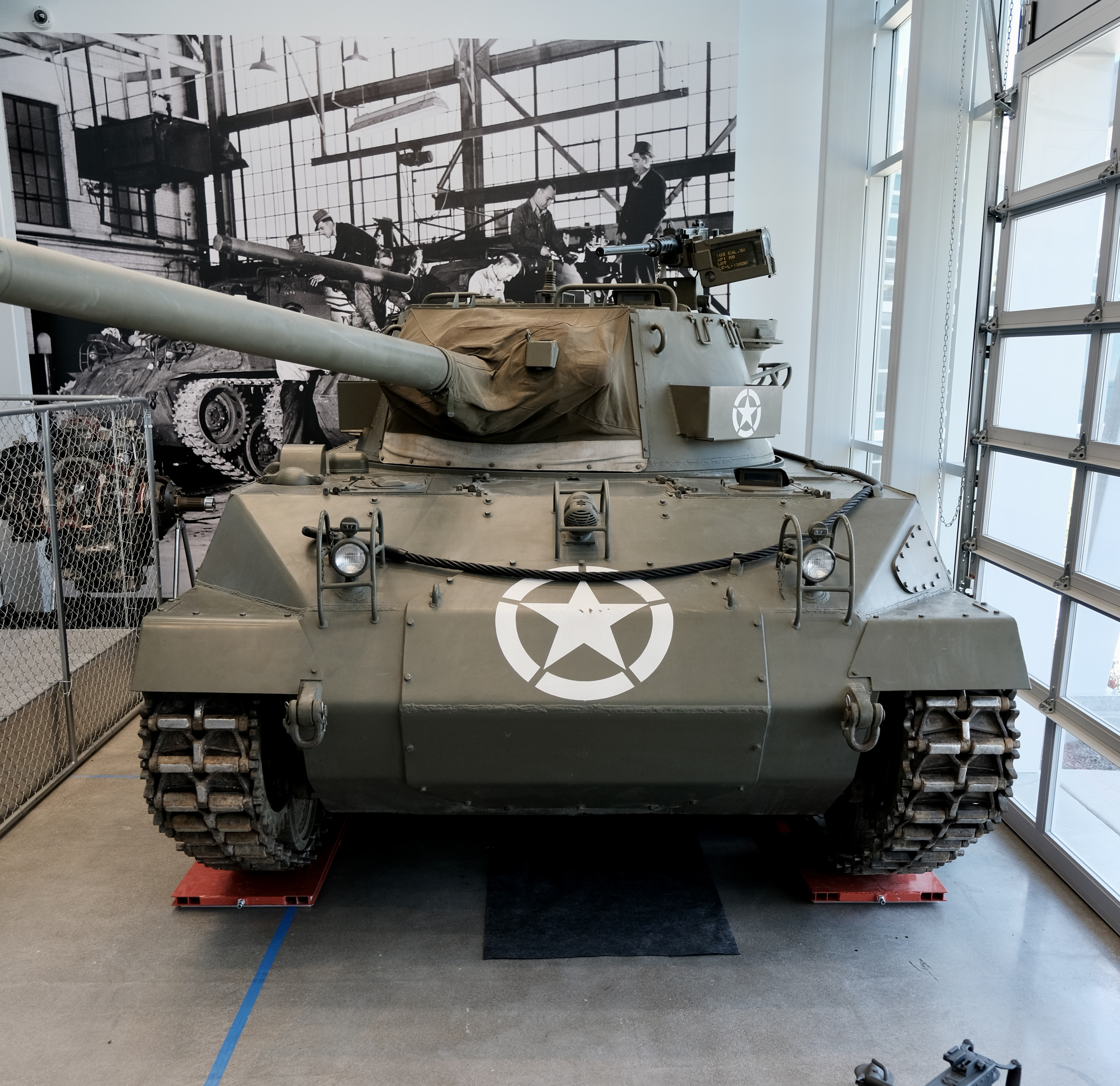
WWII Hellcat tank destroyer inside the History Gallery of Sloan Museum of Discovery

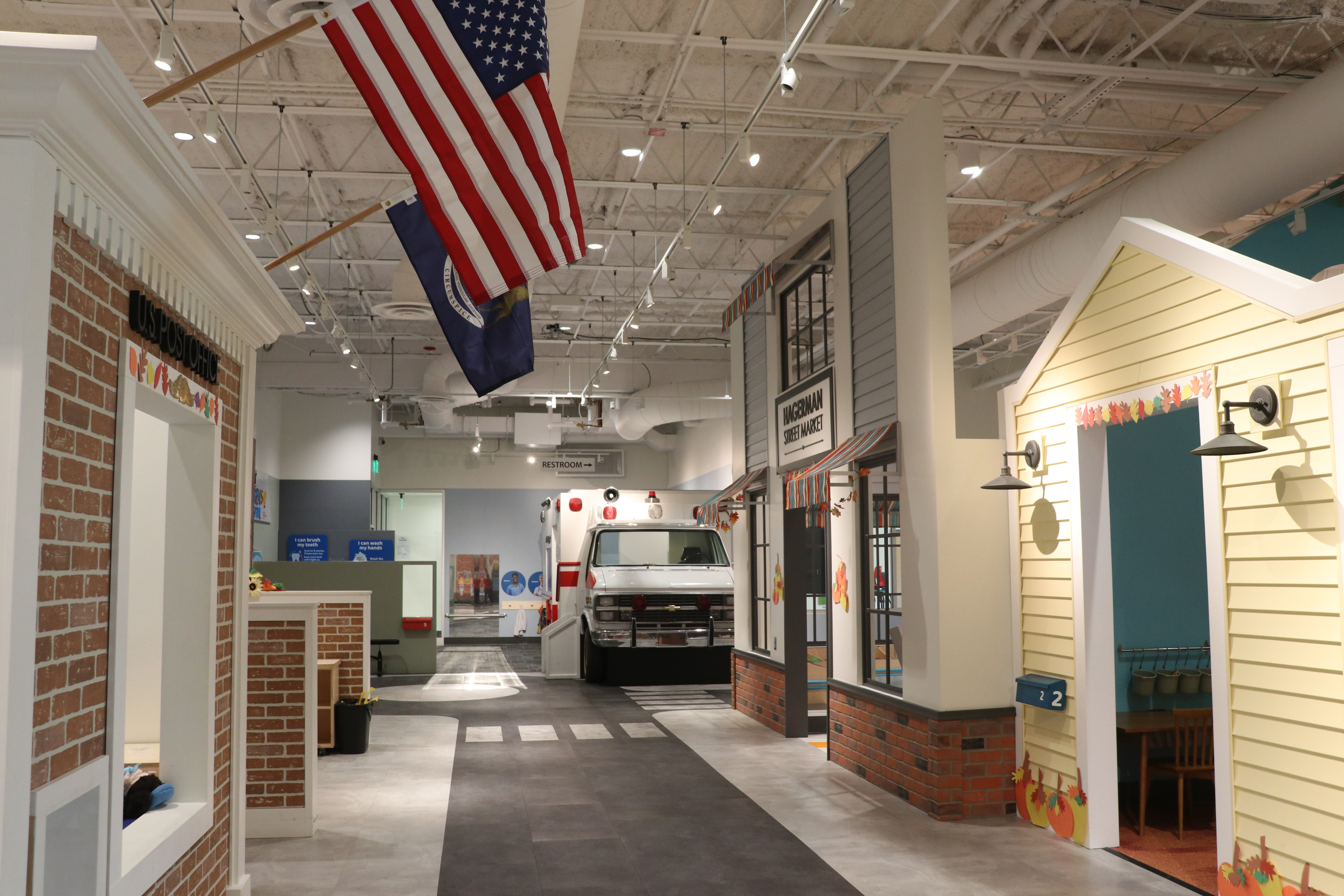

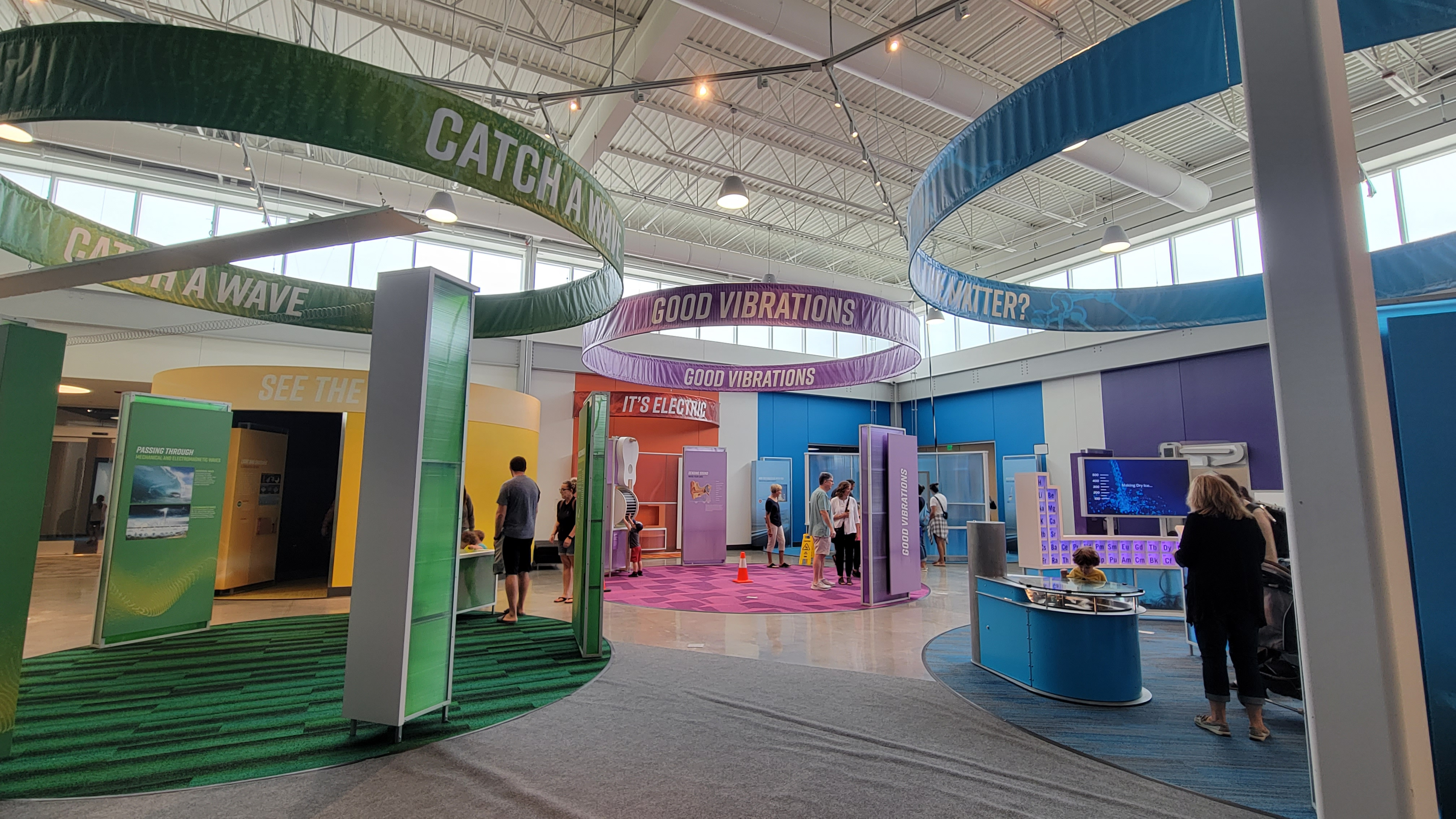

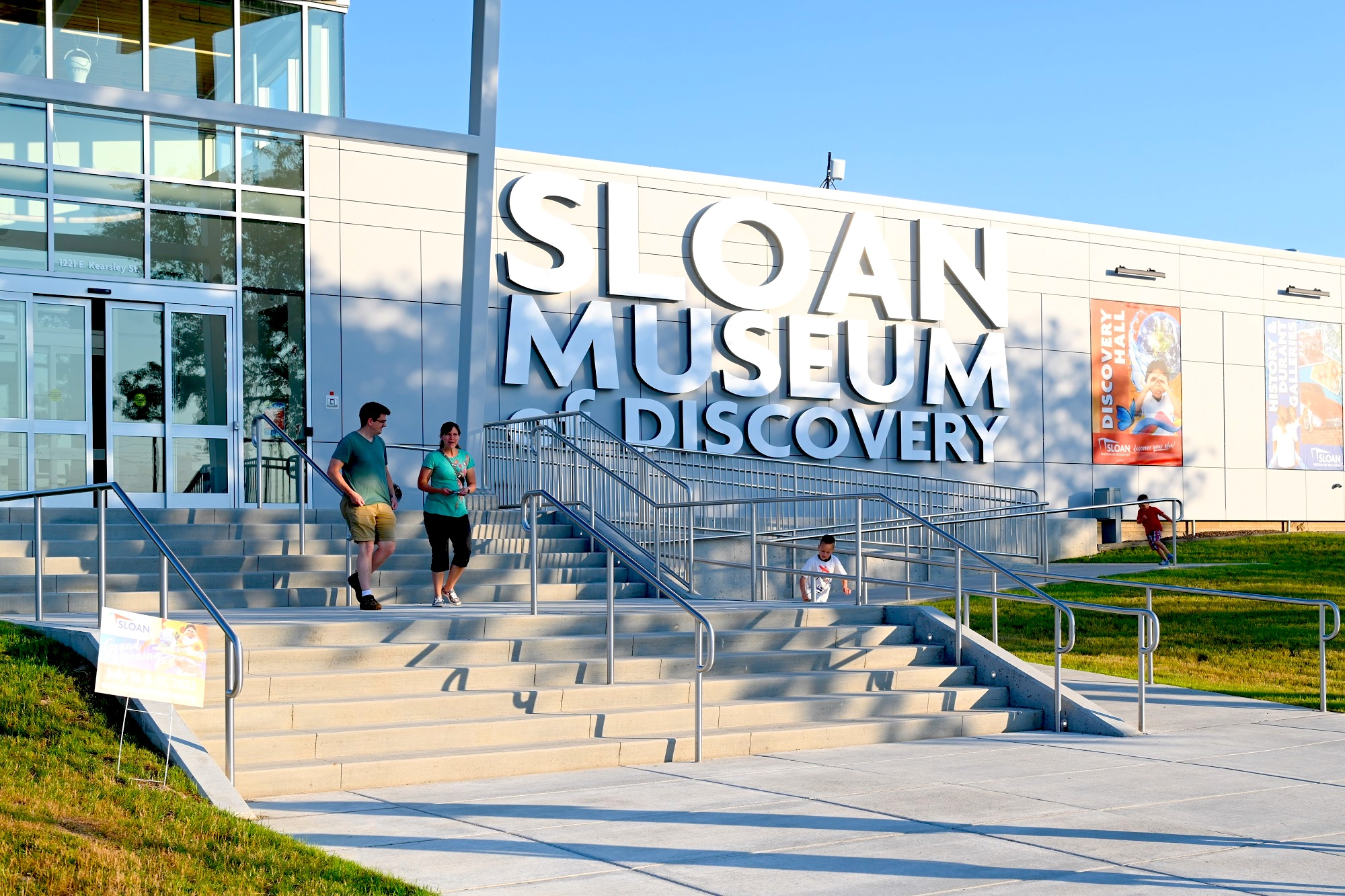

The Sloan Museum of Discovery is a nonprofit, public hands-on and interactive discovery museum located within the Flint Cultural Center in Flint, Michigan. The museum has four interactive primary galleries, including a hands-on earth sciences hall, an early childhood learning gallery, a local history gallery focusing on Genesee County and the Flint area, and an 11,000 square foot vehicle gallery featuring rare and historic vehicles built in Genesee County. The museum, named in honor of longtime General Motors chief executive officer Alfred P. Sloan, also operates rotating special exhibitions and celebrations.

== Organization ==
As part of the Flint Cultural Center, the Sloan Museum of Discovery is closely affiliated with the Longway Planetarium. Both the Sloan Museum of Discovery and Longway Planetarium are part of the non-profit Flint Institute of Science and History. There are four primary galleries and one traveling exhibit gallery at Sloan Museum of Discovery. The Durant Historic Vehicle Gallery includes historic and rare vehicles manufactured in and around Flint by General Motors and local competitors, such as Billy Durant's Durant Motors. In the History Gallery, the role of the Flint auto industry on the World War II home front is extensively featured, with visual reminders of the U.S. car culture that followed the war. In the Discovery Hall hands-on science gallery there are 11 interactives including the Great Lakes Water table plus a maker's space. In the Hagerman Street Early Childhood Learning gallery, children 0-6 can learn through play in a child-sized mid-century town.

The original Sloan Museum building, built in 1966, closed in 2018 for a major overhaul and expansion. Construction began in June 2019, and the expanded museum opened July 16, 2022.
