= Cyrus Osborn =

American automobile engineer

Cyrus Osborn (August 27, 1897 – November 15, 1968) was a manager at General Motors in the 1930s and 1940s. He is best known for inventing the railroad dome car in 1947. Born in Dayton, Ohio, Osborn served in World War I and graduated from the University of Cincinnati with an M.E. degree in 1921. Osborn then started as an apprentice with Dayton Engineering Laboratories (a division of General Motors). He rose through the ranks to manage G.M.'s overseas division, and then became the second in command at G.M.'s Opel division in Germany in 1936. His leadership of Opel from 1937 to 1940 was marked by increasing controversy as tensions between the United States and Germany increased prior to the outbreak of World War II. Osborn was elected a vice president of the corporation in 1943. He retired from G.M. in 1962 after 45 years of service.

== Experience in Nazi Germany ==
Although Osborn was senior executive at the plant, German law under Nazi power required firms to appoint a plant leader (Betriebsfuhrer). To mask US control of the plant, Rudolf A. Fleischer was awarded this position. Fleischer had previously been a treasurer of the plant and had fought for Germany in World War I. His Nazi-imposed post was not a part of Opel's managerial structure. Fleischer consistently attempted to undermine Osborn's leadership. The breaking point between the two was reached on April 20, 1938. Fleischer and Osborn had planned to present a new Opel model to Hitler on his birthday. Fleischer left Osborn behind and presented the car to Hitler by himself. In doing so Fleischer had given the US leadership of GM grounds for termination. To Osborn's satisfaction, on May 25, 1938, Fleischer resigned from his position.

Cyrus Osborn is credited with saving a Jewish man who was in a concentration camp. Willy Hoffman was employed in Opel's Rüsselsheim factory, until a questionnaire in which he stated he was Jewish, resulted in his termination. Upon learning of his plight, Osborn urged him to apply at GM's British subsidiary Vauxhall Motors. Osborn explained the situation to a colleague at Vauxhall and promised Hoffman would be a good fit. After delays by British immigration restrictions and Hoffman's one-month-long incarceration in a Nazi concentration camp, he, together with his wife and daughter, reached England in March 1939 to work at Vauxhall.
