= General Motors Le Sabre =

1951 concept car

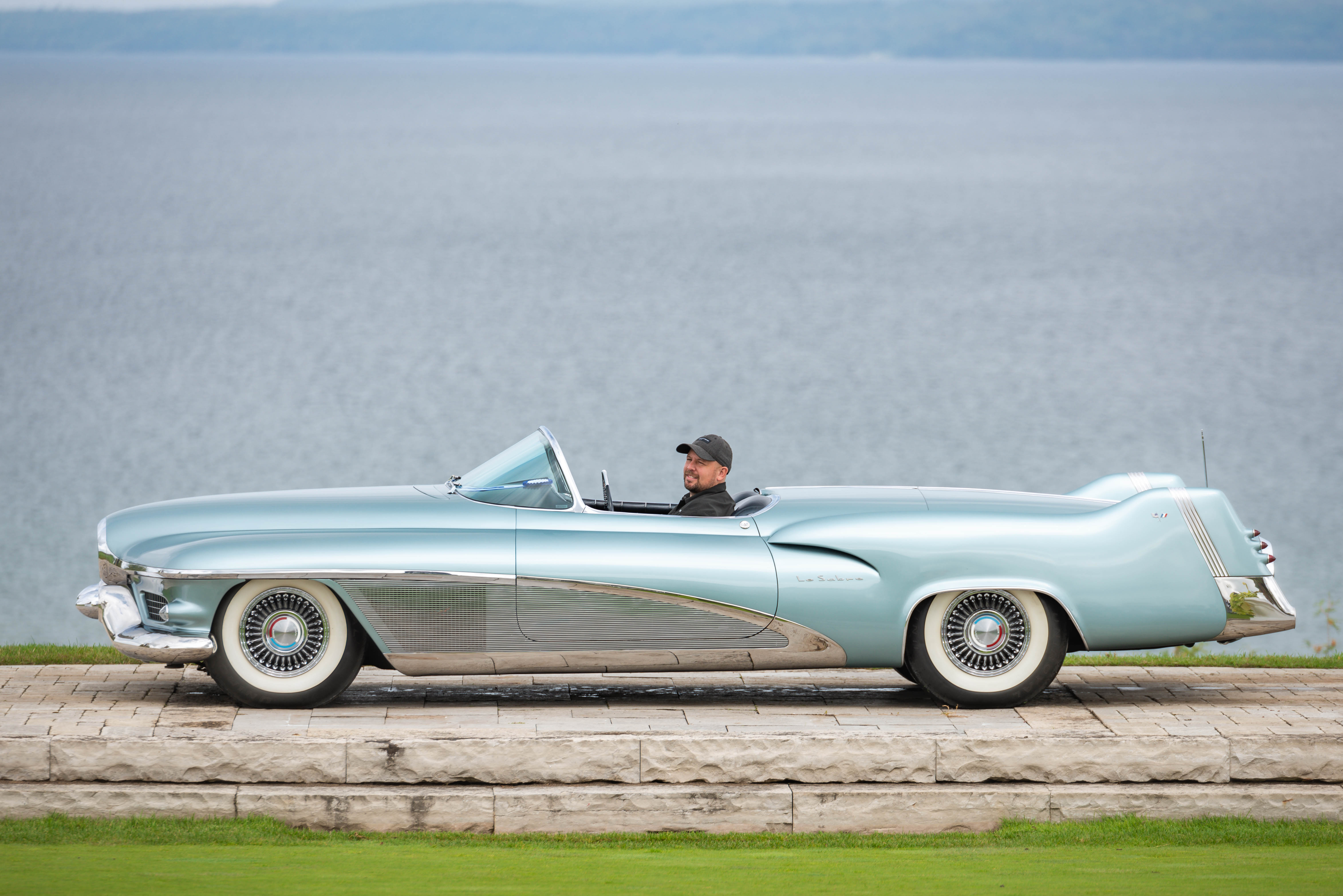
General Motors Le Sabre (2014)

The General Motors Le Sabre is a 1951 concept car, and possibly the most important show car of the 1950s. The brainchild of General Motors Art Department head Harley Earl, it introduced aircraft-inspired design elements such as the wrap-around windshield and tail fins, which became common on automotive designs during the second half of the decade.

The Le Sabre is owned by the GM Heritage Center, and still occasionally appears at car shows.

This was GM's first use of the Le Sabre name, which would be later adopted by Buick for the 1959 Buick LeSabre.

== Design and features ==
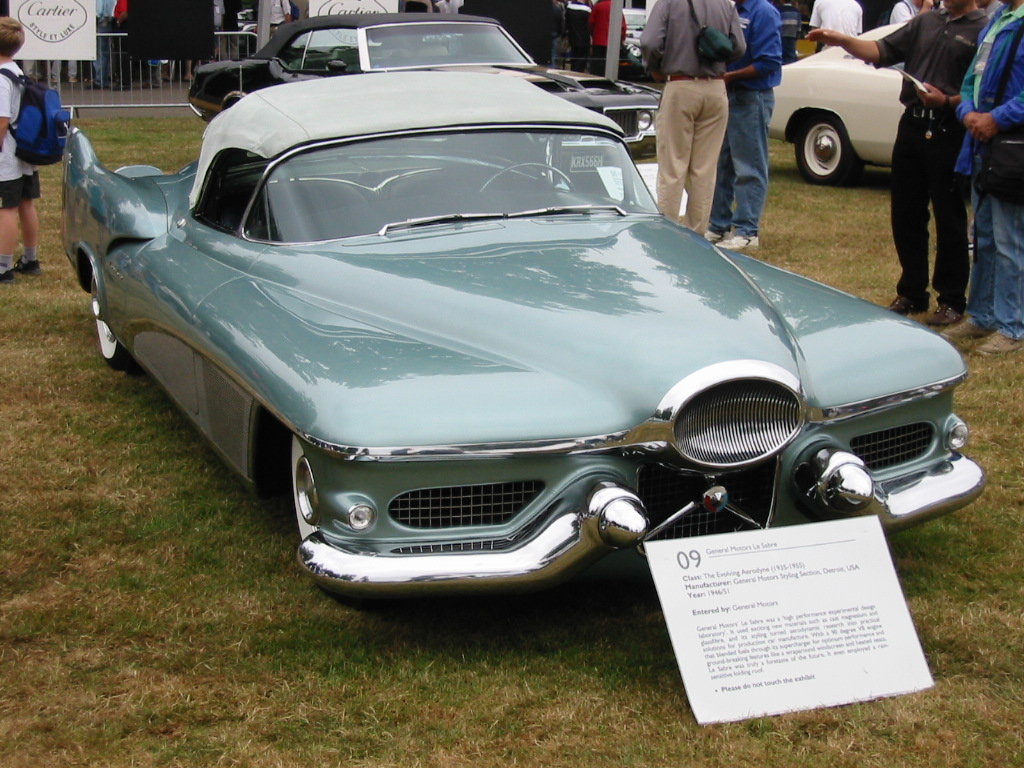
Front (2001)

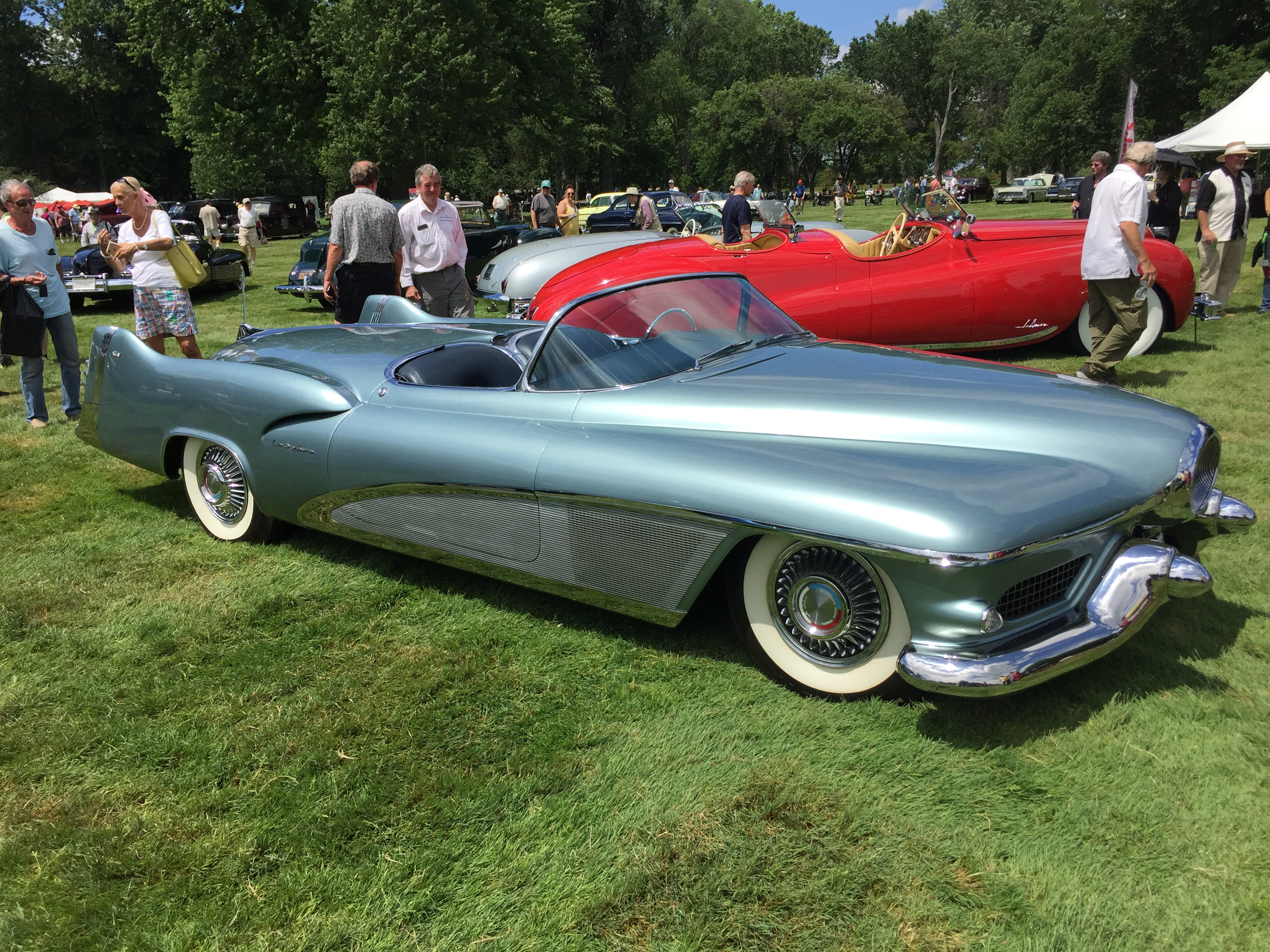
Front 3/4 view (2017)

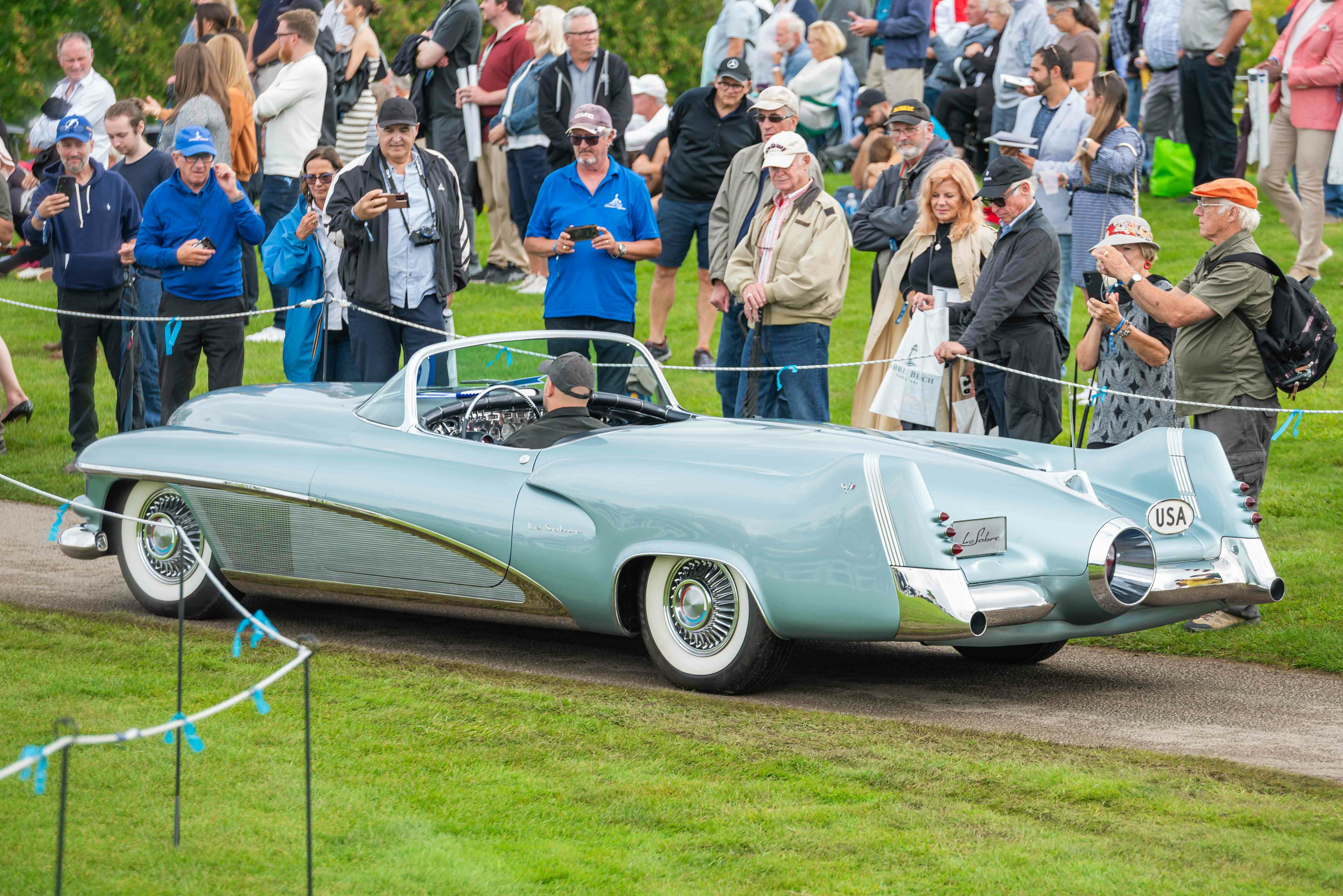
Rear 3/4 view (2014)

The Le Sabre design was General Motors Art Department head Harley Earl's attempt to incorporate the look of modern jet fighter aircraft into automotive design. The project was a follow-up to Earl's famous 1938 Buick Y-Job. Like all Earl's projects, it was built to be roadworthy, and became his personal automobile for two years after finishing its tour of the auto show circuit.

The show car's body was made of aluminium, magnesium, and fiberglass. It was powered by a supercharged aluminum V8 able to run on gasoline (petrol) or methanol, and was GM's first use of a transaxle.

In a December 1951 wire-service article entitled "Auto designer sees car of future more efficient and easier to drive”, Harley Earl explained of his introduction of tailfins, “People ask, ‘isn't your exaggerated design just for effect?’ The answer is definitely no. Typically, the twin fins on Le Sabre serve the functional purpose of carrying aircraft-type 20-gallon rubberized fuel cells.”

In addition to its aero-inspired design, the 1951 Le Sabre featured numerous other advanced features, including a bump to a 12-volt electrical system from an industrystandard 6-volt, heated seats, electric headlights concealed behind the center oval "jet intake", front bumper Dagmars (made famous later in the 1950s), a water sensor to activate the power top, and integral chassis-mounted electric lifting jacks to aid tire changes.

The rear-mounted automatic transmission was originally a Buick Dynaflow, but this was later changed to a GM Hydramatic.

This early-development aluminum V8 was unique to the Le Sabre and the Buick XP300 concept cars. The concept 215 cu in (3.5 L) V8 used a hemispherical combustion chamber similar to early Chrysler Hemi V8s of the 1950s. It was a "square" engine, with a matching 3.3" bore and stroke. Although they shared a common displacement of 215 cu in (3.5 L), this concept engine is not the same as the "oversquare" production aluminum Buick 215 introduced in the GM Y-body compact cars in 1961. They have virtually no interchangeability in parts or design.
