= Hope, Ontario =

Hope
- Unincorporated community
- Interactive map of Hope
- Coordinates: 43°53′03″N 79°31′06″W
- Country: Canada
- Province: Ontario
- Regional Municipality: York
- City: Vaughan

Government
  - City mayor: Steven Del Duca
- Time zone: UTC-5 (EST)
  - Summer (DST): UTC-4 (EDT)
- Area codes: 905 and 289
- NTS Map: 030M13
- GNBC Code: FBOQK

Hope is the northernmost community in the city of Vaughan, in Ontario, Canada. The community is mostly rural, with farms scattered along the major thoroughfare. The heart of the settlement is at Keele Street and Kirby Road, with its eastern side stretching as far as Bathurst Street.

South of Hope are the communities of Teston and Maple. Recently, due to Vaughan's strong growth, its urban sprawl has had an effect on Hope, and its neighbouring communities as well. In the future urban plan for Maple, the North Maple Park is planned to meet the current heart of the community. Metrolinx has approved a Kirby GO Station along the Barrie line to be built. A large residential area is also planned.
