= Canadian National Railway facilities in Peel Region =

Canadian National Railway facilities in Peel Region consists of two specialized facilities, which are both accessed using the CN Halton Subdivision.

== Brampton Intermodal Terminal ==
Located at 76 Intermodal Drive, it is a major Intermodal terminal located between Airport Road and Goreway Drive in Brampton and bound to the north by Queen Street and Intermodal Drive to the south. The terminal is connected to MacMillan Yard to redirect intermodal freight cars.

The terminal is located next to Canadian Tire's Distribution Centre with the company being a major intermodal client.

== Malport Freight Yard ==
Malport Yard is a smaller yard located in Mississauga south of Steeles Avenue between Airport Road and Torbram Road. It is located at milepoint 9.7 on the Halton Subdivision. The yard services CN's own intermodal units, as well perform local switcher or transfer cars to other trains. The yard is also connected with MacMillan Yard.

Located next to Malport is the Jet Fuel Rail Offloading, Storage and Distribution Facility. It was built at a cost of $59-65 million and opened on 21 July 2009. It is used to supply the Toronto Pearson International Airport with jet fuel. The opening of the terminal coincided with a significant increase in the import of aviation fuel to Canada, with the rate of aviation fuel importation increasing from 10% in the early 2000s to 33% by 2008; this has been linked to refinery closures as well as the decision by some refiners to switch production away from aviation fuel to diesel or other, higher-demand distillates. As of 2009, CN transports the fuel to the facility from the Port of Quebec, as well as from a CN transload terminal in Flat Rock, Michigan. Before the facility's construction, fuel was trucked to the airport from CN's MacMillan Yard rather than being brought directly by rail. As of 2009, the facility is owned by the Pearson International Fuel Facilities Corporation, which leases it out to the Toronto Fuel Committee (owned by a consortium of airlines), and is managed by FSM Management Group Inc. of Dorval, Quebec.

In 2016, CN and Emergency Response Assistance Canada (ERAC) conducted a full-scale emergency response exercise at Malport Yard around the handling of dangerous petroleum products in a rail yard setting.

== See also ==
- CN Halton Subdivision
- MacMillan Yard
