= CN York Subdivision =

Railway line in Greater Toronto

York Subdivision

Overview
- Status: Operational
- Owner: Canadian National Railway
- Locale: Ontario, Canada
- Termini: Pickering; Vaughan

Service
- Type: Heavy rail
- System: Canadian National Railway
- Operator(s): Canadian National Railway (freight)

Technical
- Track gauge: 1,435 mm (4 ft 8 1/2 in) standard gauge
- Signalling: Centralized traffic control

The CN York Subdivision, or York Sub, is a railway line in York and Durham regions in the Greater Toronto Area. It runs for 25 miles between the Pickering Junction on the eastern edge of Toronto, and the MacMillan Yard in Vaughan.

Prior to the construction of the York Sub, CN traffic ran through the downtown core along the CN Kingston Subdivision and through the Union Station area. During the 1950s, CN developed a plan to move traffic off of this line to a major new switching yard (MacMillan Yard) in what was then farmland north of the city. Traffic normally passing through downtown was switched onto the two new subdivisions, the Halton Sub connecting to the west, and the York Sub to the east. Construction of the York Sub took place between 1959 and 1965.

Although the York sub usually only has freight traffic, once in a while, especially recently: VIA Rail trains have seen use on the sub to the Doncaster diamond (junction between the Bala and York Subdivisions).facilitate track construction in the Scarborough area of Toronto. From there, passenger trains take the bala sub along the don river to union station. On top of this rare case of corridor trains using the sub, northbound VIA Rail Canadian trains use the sub eastbound between Snider and Doncaster to return north up the Bala Sub, utilizing the CN/GO Newmarket Sub to loop through Toronto.

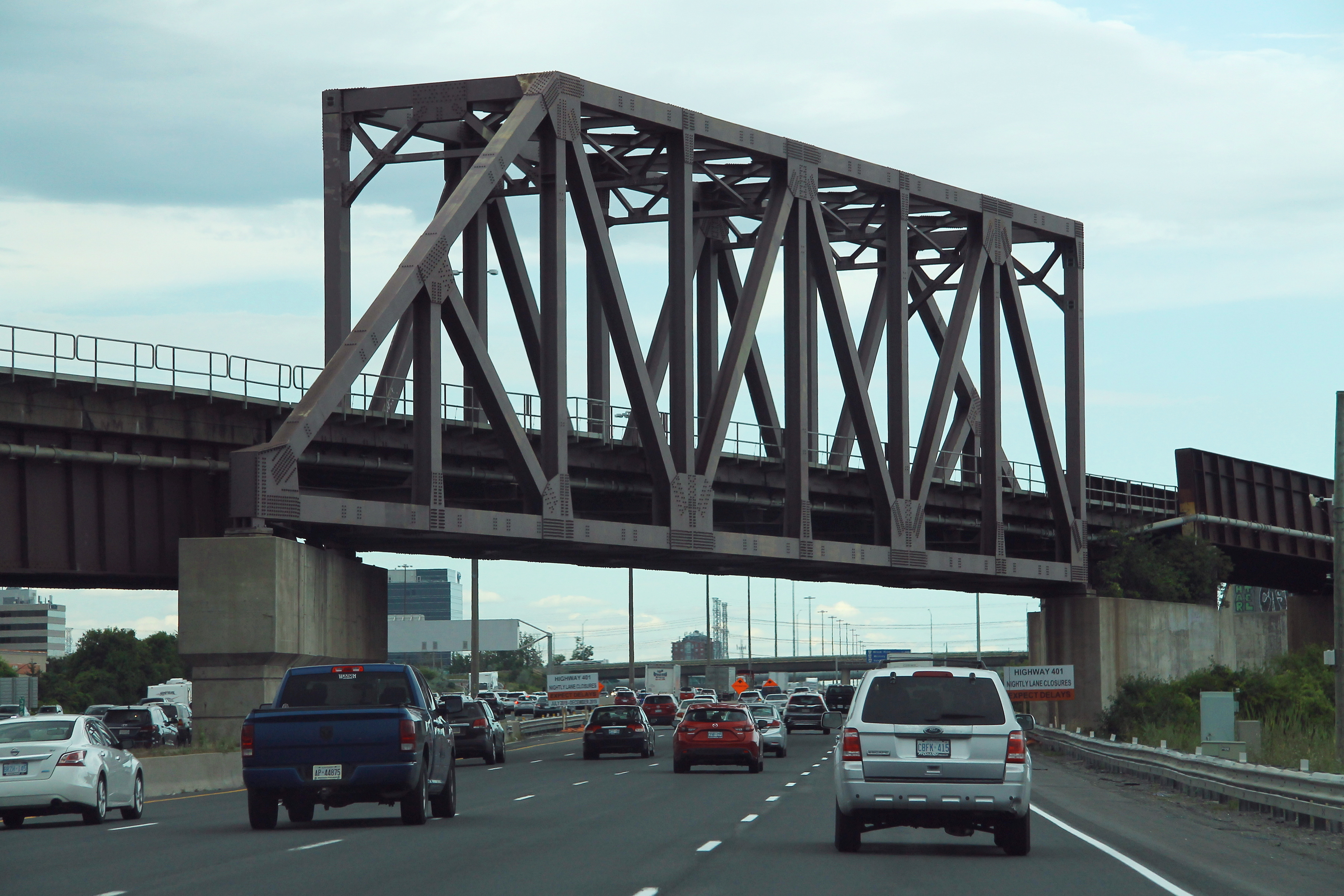
Rail bridge in Pickering that carries rail traffic over Highway 401

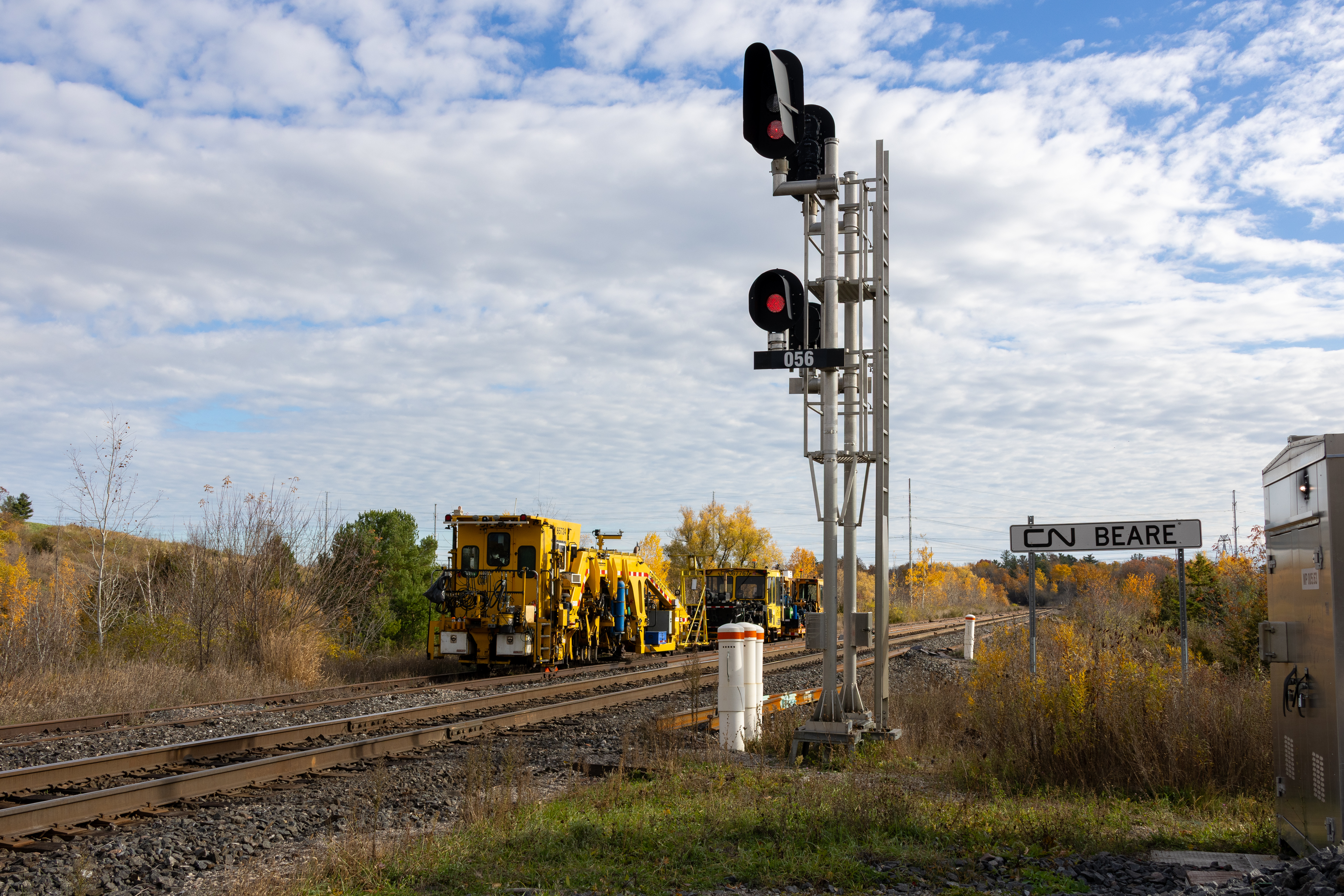
Rail tracks along the CN York Subdivision adjacent to Beare Hill Park in Toronto

Originally built in what was then farmland, the York Sub is now mostly urbanized in the Greater Toronto Area and has little room for expansion. The line spurs off northwest from the Kingston Sub at Pickering Junction in Pickering, with a bridge crossing over Highway 401. The line briefly enters Toronto (passing through Rouge National Urban Park) and enters York Region, where it runs between Steeles Avenue and Highway 7 to west of Keele Street, where it continues west as the Halwest Subdivision at the wye tracks leading into the MacMillan Yard. It connects with the Newmarket Sub at Snider, with the Bala Sub at Doncaster, and with the Uxbridge Sub at Hagerman. Originally, there were diamonds with connecting wyes at each of these locations, but since the crossing with the Uxbridge Subdivision was grade separated, the connecting tracks at Hagerman were removed.

The opening of the York Sub led to dramatically less traffic on the portion of the Kingston Sub between Pickering Junction and Union Station in downtown Toronto, with a notable exception being autorack trains travelling to and from the Ford assembly plant in Oakville. This allowed GO Transit to offer passenger trains along this route starting in 1967, on what is today known as the Lakeshore East line. Metrolinx has since purchased this section of the Kingston Sub, which has removed almost all of CN's traffic from the downtown routes. Metrolinx also purchased a portion of the Newmarket Sub from Union Station to Barrie to operate their Barrie line. The Newmarket Sub, north of Rama, is still owned by CN. The significant amount of traffic on the York Sub led to delays on the Barrie line, backing up at the Snyder diamond. This led to the creation of a new grade-separated bridge to bypass the junction, allowing GO traffic to operate unhindered. Similarly, a grade-separated bridge was built at Hagerman, where the Uxbridge subdivision crosses the York subdivision. This bridge opened for service in December 2008.
