= Concord, Vaughan =

Concord
- Suburban district
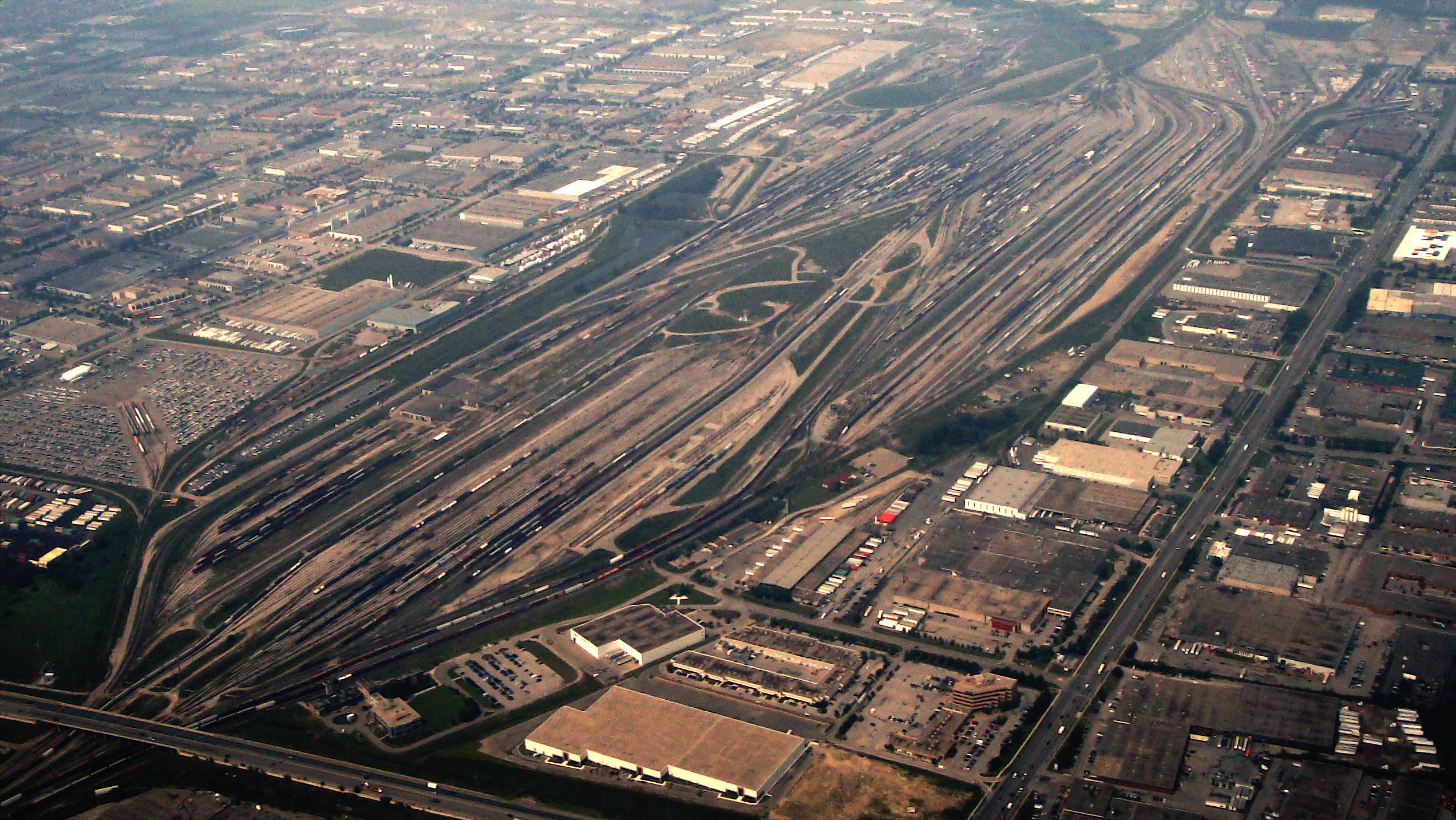
- The MacMillan Yard is at the centre of Concord's industry.

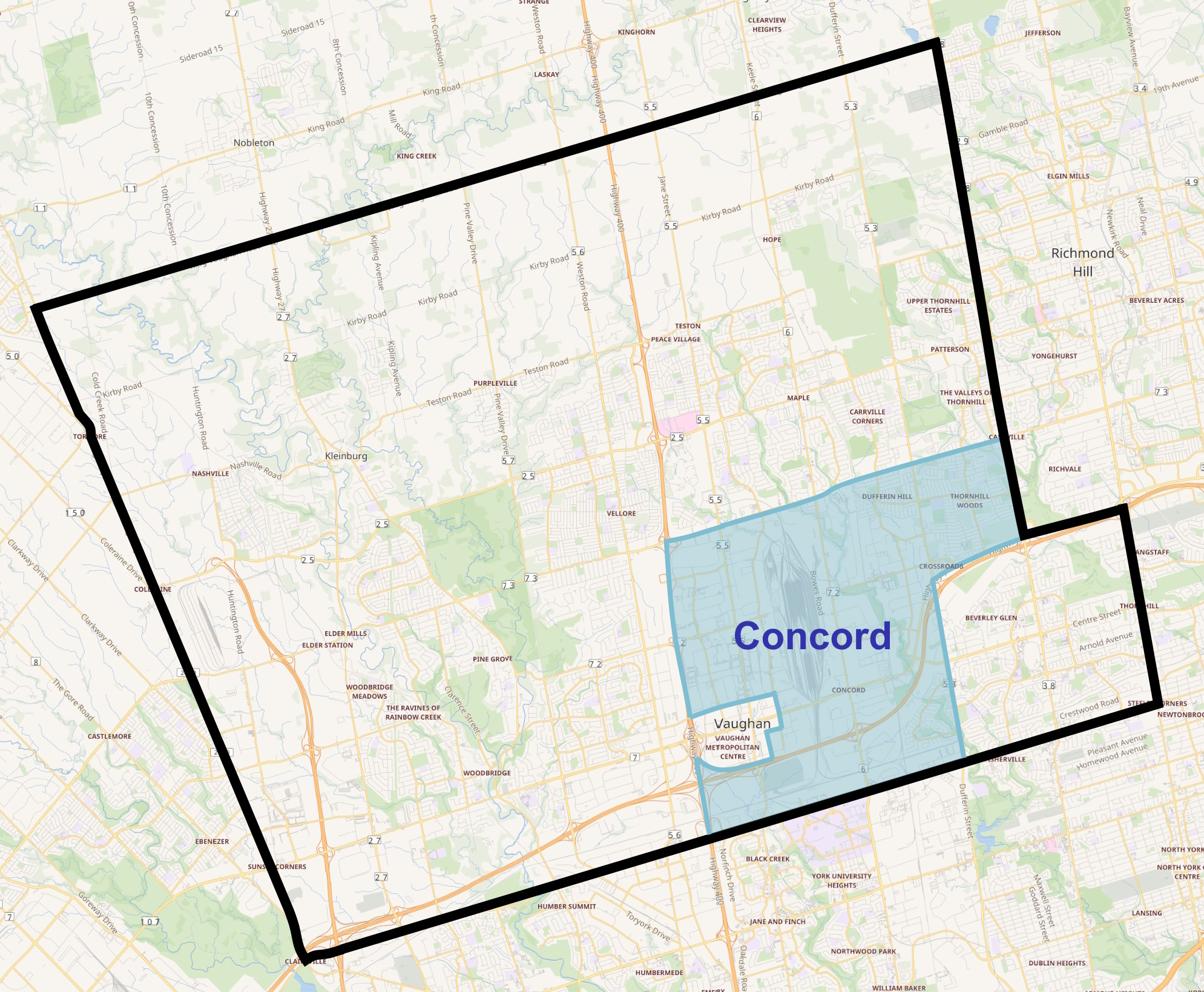
- Concord within Vaughan
- Coordinates: 43°48′30″N 79°28′8″W
- Country: Canada
- Province: Ontario
- Regional Municipality: York
- City: Vaughan
- Settled: Mid-19th Century
- Incorporated: 1854 (Postal village)
- Changed Municipality: 1971 York Region from York County; 1971 Vaughan Township into Town of Vaughan; 1990 City of Vaughan

Government
  - MP: Melissa Lantsman (Thornhill)
  - MPP: Laura Smith (Thornhill)
  - Councillors: Sandra Yeung Racco (Ward 4); Alan Shefman (Ward 5)

Population (2001)
  - Total: 8,255
- Forward Sortation Area: L4K

Concord is a suburban industrial district in the City of Vaughan in York Region, located north of Toronto, Ontario, Canada. According to the 2001 Census, Concord has 8,255 residents.

It is accessed by two provincial highways: Highway 407 and Highway 400. Concord's approximate boundaries are Steeles Avenue to the south, Highway 400 to the west, Dufferin Street to the east, and Rutherford Road to the north, though it includes the Carrville neighbourhood east to Bathurst Street between Rutherford and Highway 7. The area along Highway 7, from Highway 400 to just east of Jane Street, though still often considered by many to be part of Concord, is now officially a new district, the Vaughan Metropolitan Centre, which is Vaughan's planned urban core.

== History ==
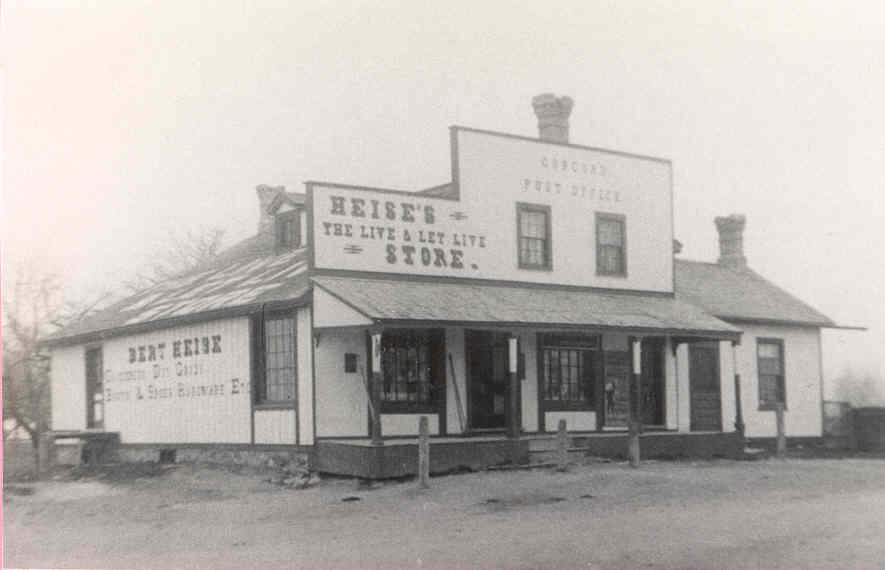
Concord Post Office in 1854

Concord became a postal village in 1854 when John Duncan became postmaster at the northwest corner of what is now Dufferin and Centre Streets. The area's name is likely linked to Hiram White (1788-1859) who came to Vaughan Township from Concord, Vermont in 1818. White farmed in the area (Lot 8 Concession 3) north of the village. The Northern Railway of Canada established a stop at Thornhill in 1853, located to the north of present-day Highway 7 along the GO Barrie line. In 1853, Canadian Northern Railway renamed the stop Concord. It was closed in the 1960s and demolished by CNR in 1978. The village had two churches (Concord Methodist Church and Cober Dunkard Church) in the 1880s and a school in 1842. By the 1930s, the 19th century school buildings and all other village structures were demolished.

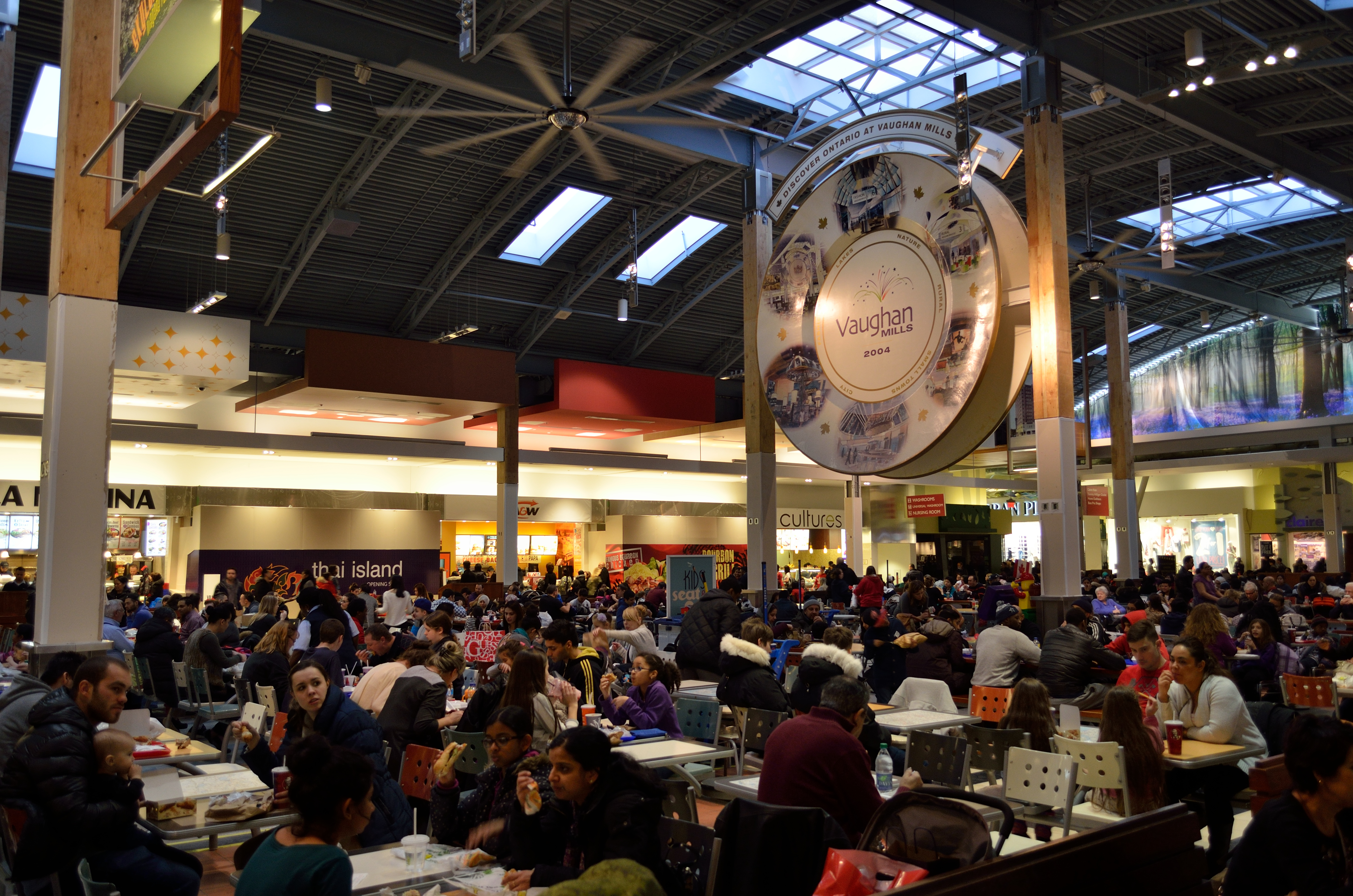
The food court at Vaughan Mills, a mall at the northwesternmost edge of Concord that opened in 2004

Suburbanization of Concord began in the 1950s after Highway 400 opened in the Keele Street and Highway 7 area, 2 km (1.2 mi) west of the original settlement, with a small housing development southeast of the intersection. This decade also saw industrial development stretching west to Jane Street south of Highway 7. as well as construction of a Canadian National Railway by-pass of Toronto which included a major freight yard, MacMillan Yard, as part of the project. In the 1970s, the industrialization and commercialization of the northern part of the district began, mostly along Highway 7 and Keele, with development continuing into the 2000s. A residential area, Glen Shields, was built in the 1970s and 1980s in the southeast, west of Dufferin. Construction of Highway 407 commenced in the mid-1990s and opened in 1997, with three interchanges in Concord. Another residential section, Dufferin Hill, was built in the 2000s in the northeast, near Dufferin and Rutherford. In the early 2000s, construction of the Vaughan Mills shopping mall began, being completed in 2004.

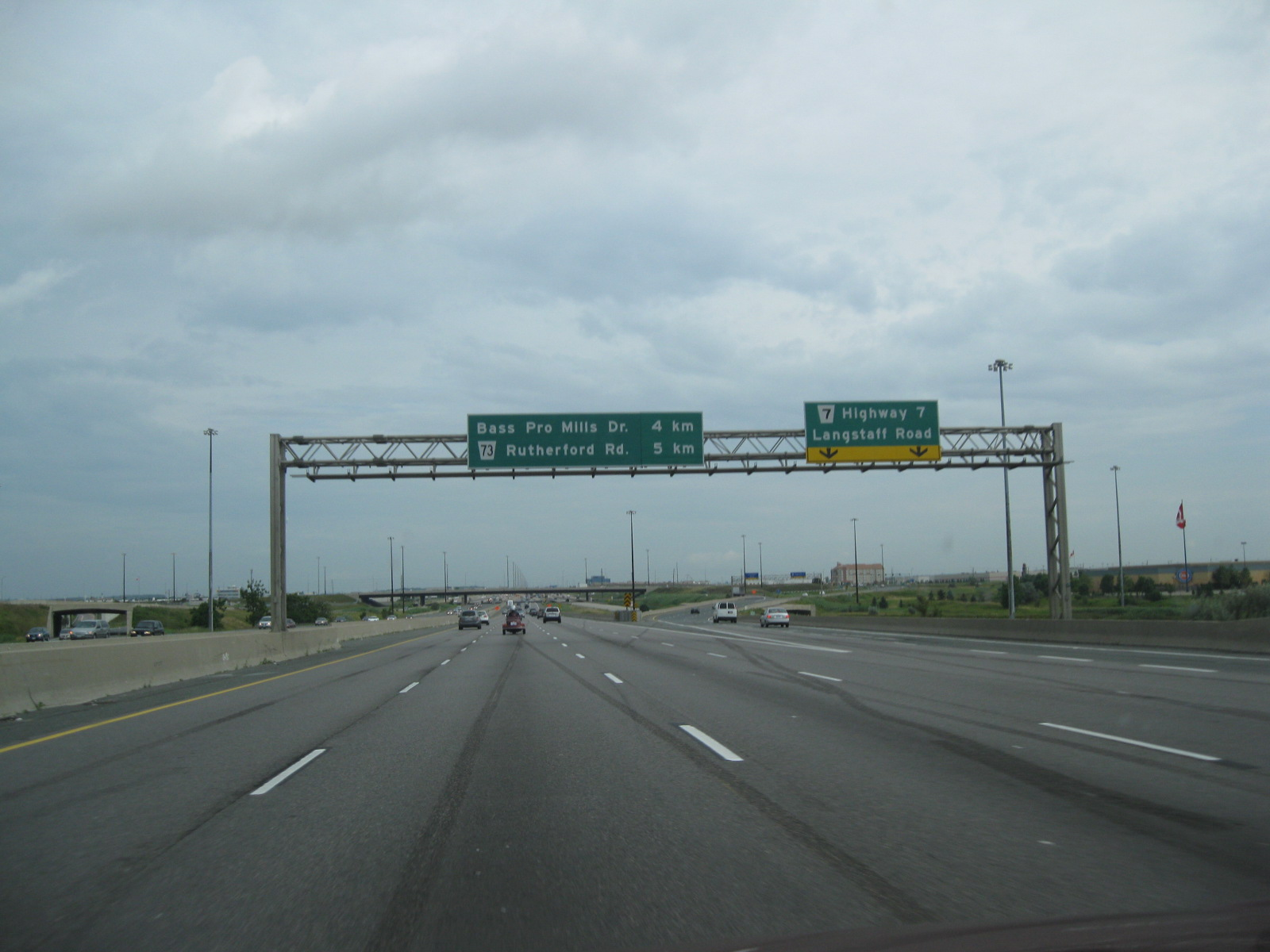
Northbound Highway 400 at the Highway 7 and Langstaff Road exit

Until the opening of Canada's Wonderland to the north in Maple in 1981, when an interchange was constructed at Rutherford Road to provide better access to the theme park, Concord had only one interchange, at Highway 7. A third was added in 1996 when a partial interchange at Langstaff Road was opened, and three more were opened following the completion of the tolled Highway 407 in 1997. A partial interchange, connecting Highway 400 with Vaughan Mills, opened several years later. Today, Concord has eight interchanges, of which three connect with the toll highway, two are partial, one is a four-level stack and the other two connect to the 400. A plan for an interchange at Centre Street was proposed, but was later cancelled.

Much of Concord is industrial while empty spaces remain in the southern part, in the Black Creek and 407 area, and along the CN railway line. Wooded areas are located in the north and within Black Creek and along the Don River. One tract of forest is located to the northwest. All main roads except for Langstaff east of Creditstone Road are four-lane roadways,

Concord is the main industrial district of Vaughan. Many large multi-national and domestic corporations have headquarters there, including Toys R Us Canada. and Tootsie Roll Industries. Its access to several major highways is a key factor in the locations of these businesses.

== Proposed Concord GO Centre ==
The draft Concord GO Centre secondary plan was presented in an open house for the public on November 4, 2013. The plan is for a new GO Transit station and a development with mixed uses and multimodal transportation access, including residential, commercial, and recreational areas, cycling trails, and connections to several transportation systems. The site is bounded by Rivermede Road on the north, the electrical power corridor to the south and east, Bowes Road on the west north of Highway 7, and the Barrie line railway tracks on the west south of Highway 7. The area to be developed consists of the land immediately adjacent to the intersection of Highway 7 and the Barrie line railway tracks.

The plan enables the location of a railway station for the Barrie line, but does not incorporate it into the design. Creation of the station and its location are the responsibility of Metrolinx, which would have to complete an environmental assessment for a potential station. The plan also provides provisions for a Viva bus station, but does not incorporate it into the design.

== Education ==
Public schools in the area are managed by the York Region District School Board, while Catholic schools are managed by the York Region Catholic District School Board.

=== Public elementary ===
- Glen Shields Public School
- Forest Run Public School

Concord Public School (now Patricia Kemp Community Centre) on Dufferin Street was the area's first public school. The school dated back to an 1842 log schoolhouse, replaced by a brick schoolhouse in the 1880s. The second school burned down in 1930 and was replaced by the current structure in 1931.

=== Catholic ===
- Our Lady of the Rosary Catholic School

=== Post-secondary ===
- Yorkville University-Toronto Film School
- Niagara University

== Surrounding neighbourhoods ==
- Woodbridge
- Maple
- Thornhill
- Vaughan Metropolitan Centre
- York University Heights (City of Toronto)
