= Barrie Collingwood Railway =

Railway line in Ontario, Canada

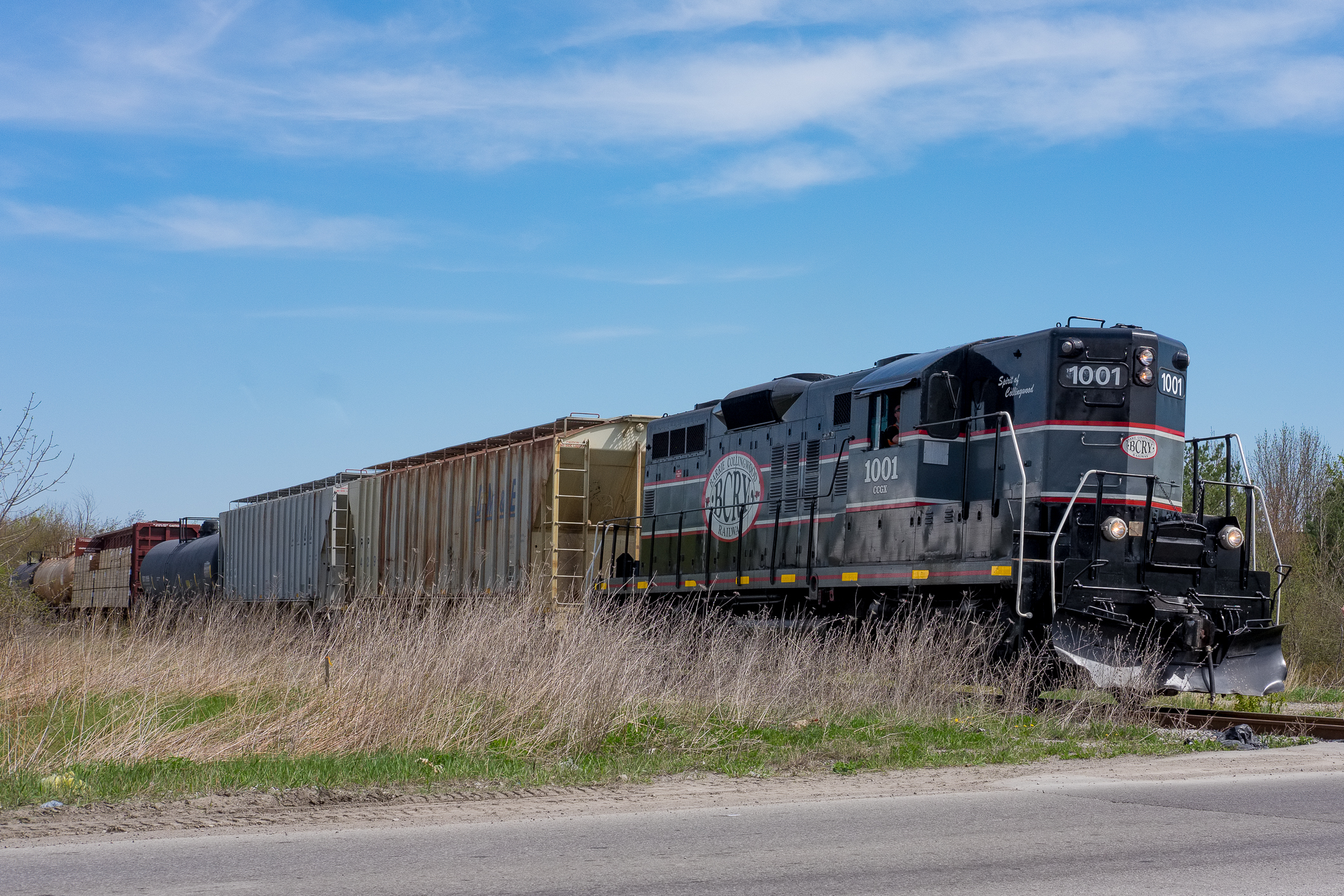
- BCRY's lone locomotive, CCGX 1001, about to pull its train southbound across Saunders Road in Barrie in May 2018.

Overview
- Reporting mark: CCGX
- Locale: Simcoe County, Ontario, Canada
- Dates of operation: 1998–Present
- Predecessor: Canadian National Railway

Technical
- Track gauge: 4 ft 8 1/2 in (1,435 mm) standard gauge

The Barrie-Collingwood Railway (reporting mark CCGX), commonly referred to as the BCRY, is a shortline railway operating between the towns of Innisfil and Utopia in south central Ontario, Canada. The line was started in 1998 and runs on former Canadian National (CN) trackage which was collectively purchased by the railway's namesake municipalities. The BCRY continues to run under the ownership of the City of Barrie and is operated by Cando Rail Services Ltd., based in Brandon, Manitoba.

== History ==
In 1996, the Canadian National Railway abandoned its Newmarket Subdivision from Bradford to Ramara, as well as its entire Meaford Subdivision which ran from Barrie to Collingwood (both parts of the former Northern Railway of Canada). CN had plans to rip up its tracks; however, the City of Barrie and the Town of Collingwood stepped in to purchase the lines to maintain their rail infrastructures. Barrie purchased the remainder of the Newmarket Subdivision, the Meaford Subdivision from Barrie to Utopia in Essa Township and the remainder of the abandoned Beeton Subdivision (originally the Hamilton and North-Western Railway) which runs south from Barrie to Innisfil and connects with the other two subs at the site of the former Allandale Yard in Barrie. Collingwood purchased the rest of the Meaford Subdivision from Utopia northwestward.

In 1998, the BCRY was created to service various customers in Innisfil, Barrie, Colwell, Angus, Stayner and Collingwood along the Beeton and Meaford Subdivisions. The line crosses the Canadian Pacific Kansas City (CPKC) Mactier Subdivision at Utopia, where a small interchange yard was subsequently built using old rails and ties pulled up from Allandale Yard. This was necessary as the abandonment of the Newmarket Sub north and south of Barrie effectively isolated the line from the North American rail network. The yard is also where maintenance of way (MOW) equipment and the locomotive is stored when not in use. Transloading facilities are also located here for customers not directly rail served. The yard has a storage capacity of 60 cars. The Newmarket Subdivision is not used by the BCRY; it was purchased to preserve future GO Transit expansion north from Bradford, which re-opened in late 2007. It has since been sold to Metrolinx, the operators of GO Transit.

The BCRY was used in the TV series Mayday for the episode featuring the San Bernardino train disaster.

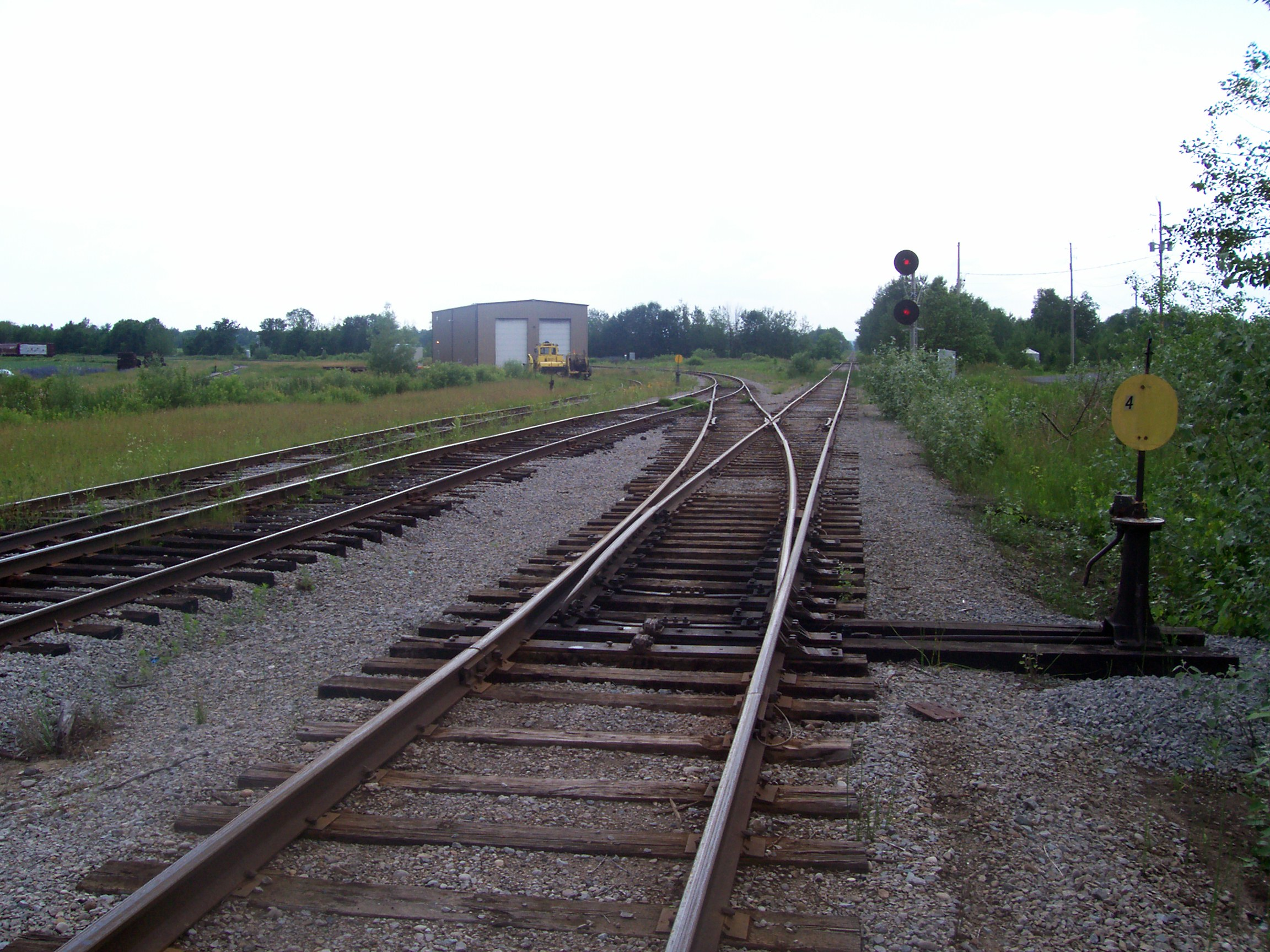
BCRY yard in Utopia in 2006

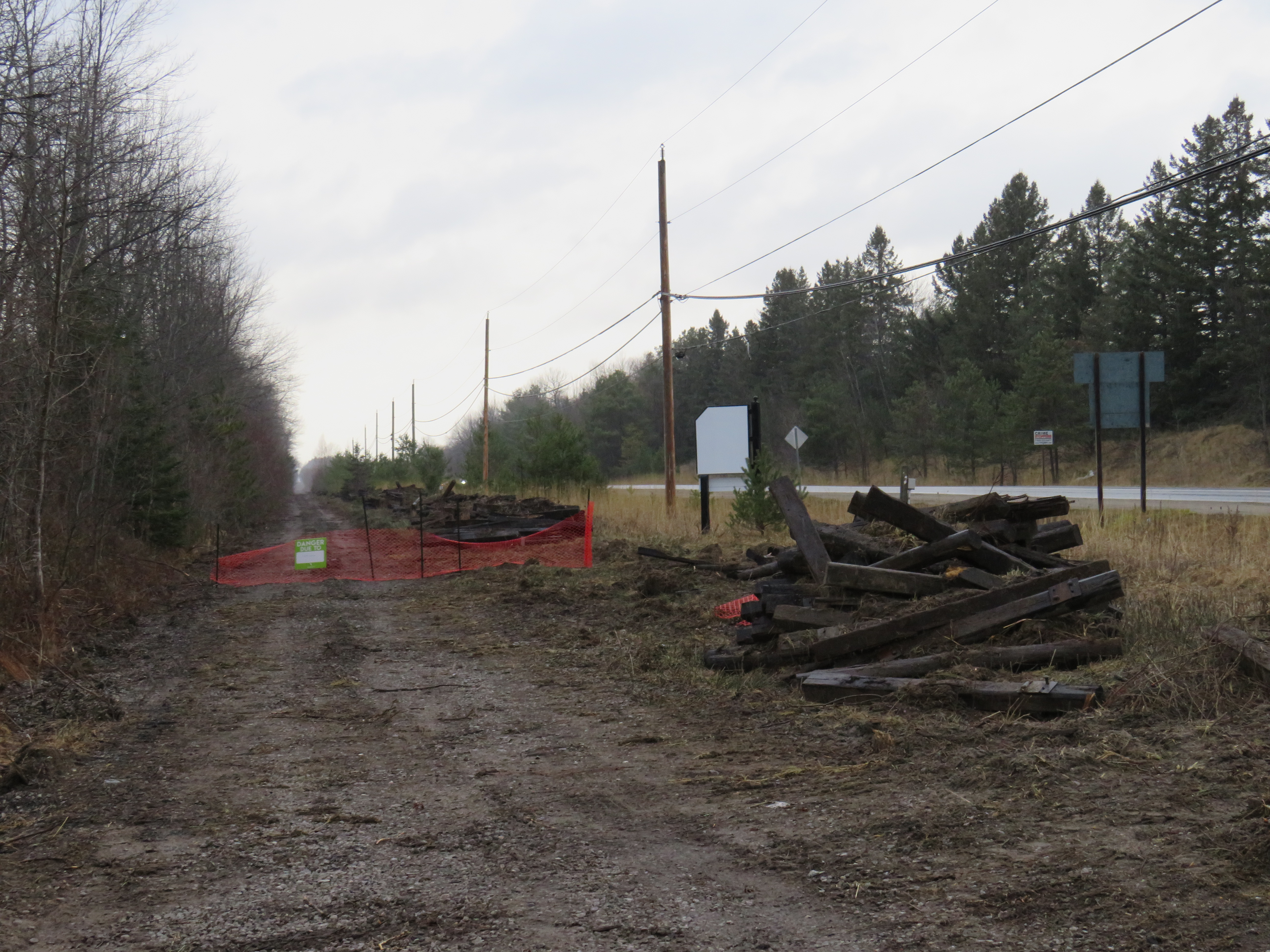
Track being lifted west of Angus in late 2023

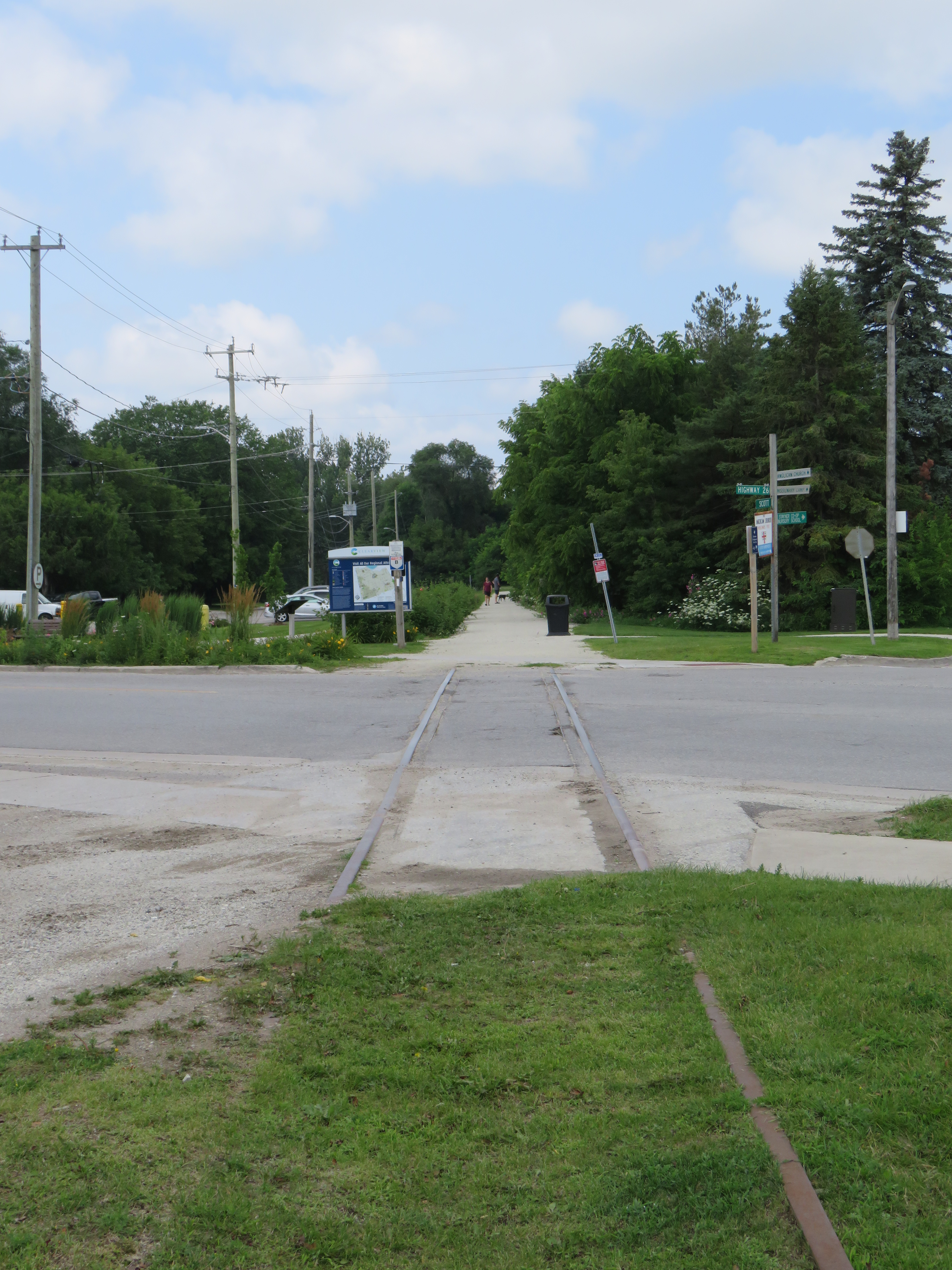
Abandoned BCRY track in Stayner crossing Highway 26 in August 2023, with a trail continuing along the right-of-way beyond. The rails crossing the road were removed shortly afterwards.

== Decommissioning of Collingwood portion of line ==
On July 15, 2011, the Town of Collingwood decided to decommission its portion of the line due to financial reasons. It was costing taxpayers up to $425,000 annually to keep providing regular rail service to essentially one customer, the Canadian Mist distillery, while Amaizeingly Green in the same industrial lot used it only sporadically. The only other user was a farm supply company in Stayner that was well served by Highway 26. In 2018, The trackage between Utopia and Collingwood was sold to the County of Simcoe, which abandoned it. The City of Barrie continues to operate the line east of the Utopia yard, serving Barrie, Essa Township and Innisfil.

After the decommissioning of the line west of Utopia, removal of the tracks was carried out over the next several years. As of late 2023, most of the abandoned track between Utopia and Collingwood had been lifted, though a few short sections remain intact. Track also remains in place to the present end of the Newmarket Subdivision at Allandale Waterfront GO Station. A rail trail has since been constructed along the former right-of-way between Stayner and Collingwood.

== Current status ==
Today the railway services only four customers in the Barrie area. They include Tag Environmental and Western Mechanical in Barrie, and Tarpin Lumber and Comet Chemical in Innisfil, effectively reducing it to a local shunting operation. The line's future could be in jeopardy unless new customers can be attracted, as operating costs consistently exceed revenues. As of January 2016, unused stretches of track are being leased for empty tank car storage, due to the slow down in the oil industry. This has led to community backlash, citing safety concerns and impact on property values.

== Equipment and track ==
Currently, the BCRY has only one locomotive, an EMD Phase III GP9, #1001, which was formerly Ohio Central (OHCR) #94 and Baltimore and Ohio (B&O) #6594. Another GP9, #1000, was in the fleet until 2000, when it was transferred to the newly created Orangeville-Brampton Railway (OBRY), another shortline which Cando operated until 2018. BCRY also possesses various MOW equipment and a road railer.

The track is over a century old, though remains in satisfactory condition for the class of track. Speed is limited along the line due to the short length of each subdivision. Track speed is currently 10 miles per hour (16 km/h). Efforts are continuously made to improve the right-of-way, including tie and rail replacement and signal upgrades. Between 2011 and 2018, all level crossings on the Meaford and Beeton Subdivisions (spurs excluded) have received signal upgrades. In 2013, the level crossing at Mapleview Avenue was removed during the street's widening and replaced with an overpass.

== See also ==
- MacTier Subdivision
- North Simcoe Railtrail
- Barrie line
- List of Ontario railways
