= MacTier Subdivision =

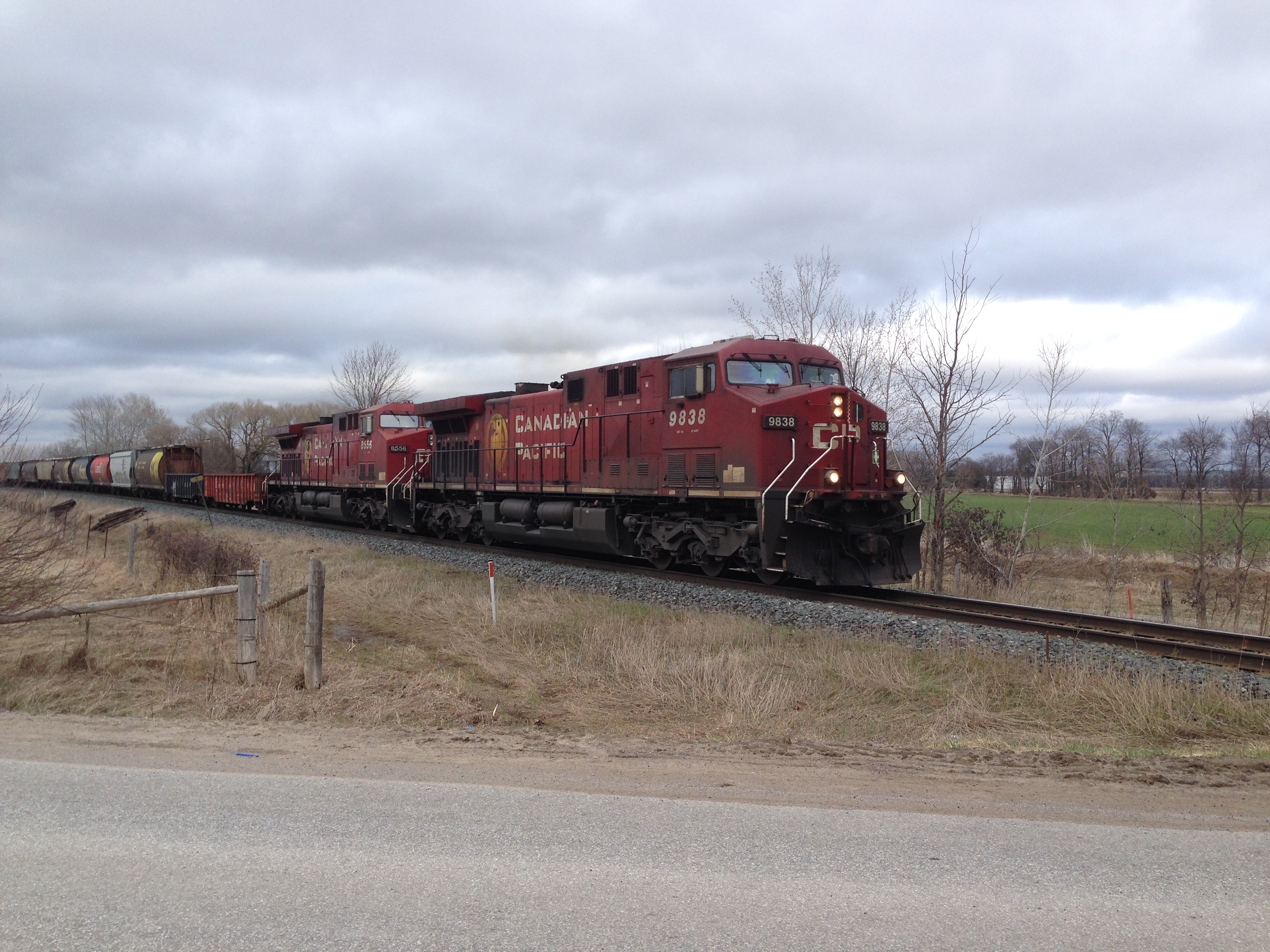
- A northbound Canadian Pacific freight train at New Tecumseth, just north of Toronto.

Overview
- Status: Operational
- Owner: Canadian Pacific Kansas City
- Locale: Greater Toronto Area and Central Ontario
- Termini: West Toronto Diamond; MacTier

Service
- Type: Freight rail
- System: Canadian Pacific Kansas City
- Services: Canadian (former)

History
- Opened: 1908

Technical
- Line length: 126.9 mi (204.2 km)
- Number of tracks: 1
- Track gauge: 1,435 mm (4 ft 8 1/2 in) standard gauge

The MacTier Subdivision is a major rail line in Ontario, Canada, which is owned and operated by the Canadian Pacific Kansas City. The line stretches 126.9 mi (204.2 km) from Toronto in the south to MacTier in northern Muskoka. The MacTier Subdivision is the easternmost section of CPKC's present-day transcontinental route and is the railway's only connection between its eastern and western holdings which is fully within Canada. The route is single-track in its entirety and hosts only freight rail service. Between 1955 and 1978 the MacTier Subdivision hosted CPR's premier transcontinental passenger train, the Canadian, from Toronto to Vancouver. Operation of the Canadian was transferred to Via Rail in 1978, which switched over to CNR's Newmarket Subdivision, rejoining the former CPR route at Parry Sound, 23 mi (37 km) north of MacTier.

== Route ==
The MacTier Subdivision begins at the West Toronto Diamond, where it diverges northwest from the Galt Subdivision, which is also a part of the Canadian Pacific Kansas City system. From here, the line parallels GO Transit's Kitchener line for about 4.5 mi (7.2 km) until diverging north. Just after crossing into York, the railway crosses under Canadian National's Halton Subdivision. Here the line passes just east of CPKC's Vaughan Intermodal facility. Following three sidings at Bolton, Palgrave and Baxter, the railway junctions with the Barrie Collingwood Railway, which runs east to Barrie. Following this junction, the route winds its way through northern Simcoe County until entering the dense forests of northern Ontario. The route enters Muskoka after crossing the Trent–Severn Waterway at Severn Falls. Travelling through the wilderness, the route reaches Bala, where it begins to parallel Canadian National's Bala Subdivision until reaching MacTier, Ontario. The subdivision ends at MacTier, where the Parry Sound Subdivision continues north to Sudbury.

== Stations ==
The MacTier subdivision had three stations served by the Canadian, all closed in 1978:

- West Toronto
- Alliston
- MacTier

== See also ==
- Barrie Collingwood Railway
- List of Ontario railways
