= MacMillan Yard =

Rail yard in Vaughan, Ontario, Canada

Coordinates: 43.812°N 79.511°W

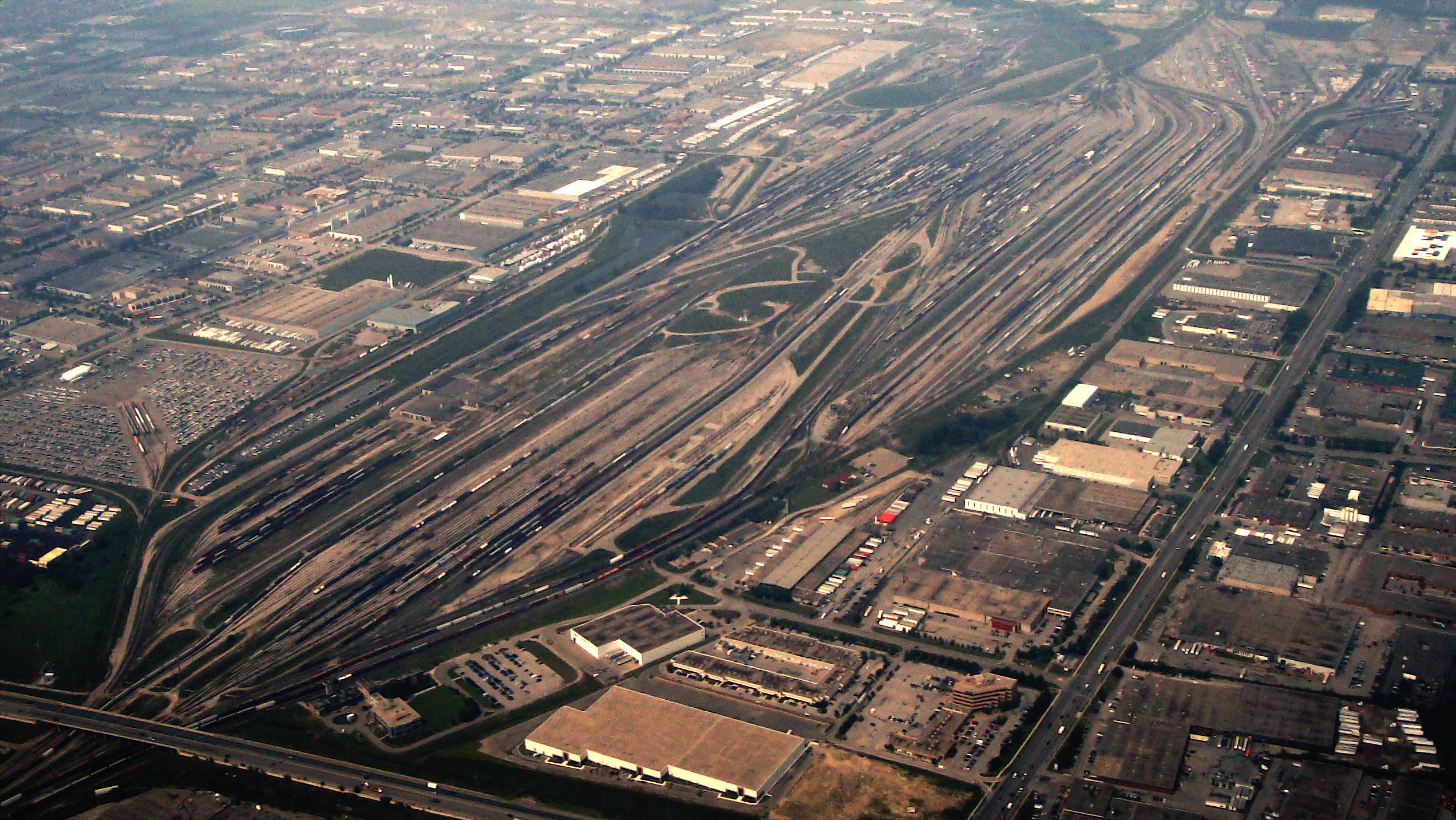
An aerial view of the MacMillan Yard, looking northwest near Highway 7 and Keele Street

MacMillan Yard is the main Toronto-area railway classification yard for Canadian National Railway (CN), and is located in the nearby city of Vaughan, Ontario. It is the second largest railway classification yard in Canada, after CN's Symington Yard in Winnipeg, Manitoba. It was originally opened in 1965 as Toronto Yard, but was renamed MacMillan Yard in 1975 after former CN president Norman John MacMillan.

MacMillan Yard is located north of the point where the "Toronto bypass" mainline changes designation between the York and Halton Subdivisions; spanning the area around the districts of Maple and Concord within Vaughan. The yard is perpendicular to the mainline with a north–south orientation and measures approximately three kilometres in length and one kilometre in width. The property is bordered by four main roads:

- Highway 407 to the south
- Keele Street to the east
- Rutherford Road to the north
- Jane Street to the west

There are five road entrances into the yard which are designated as: S Yard, Jane Street, CargoFlo, Bowes, and Administration.

The yard was developed in the late 1950s as part of CN's redesign of its Toronto trackage network; their Toronto bypass project, that moved freight traffic out of the busy downtown Toronto and surrounding area to a new modern freight yard north of the city, accessed by both newly constructed and upgraded railway lines. The first revenue train arrived in the yard on February 6, 1965, but the yard's official opening was on May 17, 1965. Much of CN's freight operations that were once located in Metropolitan Toronto (notably at the Mimico Yard and the downtown "railway lands") were moved to the new yard. The project also freed up track time along the Union Station rail corridor that allowed the Government of Ontario to establish a new commuter service, GO Transit.

Much of the yard is composed of side-by-side track, switches, humps, and control tower buildings. The yard is designed to take incoming trains and reorganize and rejoin the individual cars based on destination to create new departing trains. The yard operates 24 hours a day and handles over 1 million cars (loads and empties) per year. It has flat switching capability as well as both dual and single humps. In addition to car handling, other yard facilities include locomotive repair, car washing, and car repair. In one part of the yard, a CargoFlo terminal is used for transferring flowable bulk, dry bulk (plastics) commodities between rail cars to tanker trucks, as well as a small intermodal and RoadRailer operation.

At the time of construction, Vaughan (then known as Vaughan Township) was a largely rural municipality; however, subsequent development on the adjacent lands has created an industrial area mainly geared towards warehousing and light manufacturing uses. Some commercial establishments (e.g., restaurants, retail and wholesale outlets) are located along the perimeter of the yard. Several York Region Transit routes, including Viva Orange, operate in the vicinity of the yard; most connect to the northern terminus of the Toronto Transit Commission's Line 1 Yonge-University subway line, but one connects to Rutherford GO Station The closest residential population to a track that carries dangerous goods is located approximately 150 meters from the northern extremity of the yard. Near the southern end of the yard, Highway 7 has an overpass, and Highway 407 bridges the yard's actual southern entry point; all trains enter and exit by way of the southern end. Rutherford Road passes over the two hump pullback tracks at the north end of the yard, which curve to the west to end at the east side of Jane Street. Construction of the yard resulted in Langstaff Road being bisected by it, but plans have been floated by York Region to construct a bridge over the yard to reconnect the two sections.

== Incidents ==
On September 17, 2007, while pulling south on the pullback track with consist of 67 loads and 30 empties, weighing about 9054 tons, the 2200 West yard assignment side-collided with the tail end of train M33931-17. The train was departing MacMillan Yard at 15 miles per hour on the Halton outbound track. Two locomotives and two cars of the yard assignment derailed. Six cars on train 339 derailed and/or sustained damage, including two special dangerous goods tank cars containing chlorine (UN1017). Approximately 3785 litres of diesel fuel (UN1202) leaked from the derailed locomotives. There were no injuries.

On July 29, 2015, 91 freight cars ran away in the yard after they separated from a switching locomotive. Nine of those freight cars derailed and two freight cars on an adjacent track were damaged when the runaway cars collided at low speed with other cars that were a part of an incoming train in the yard. No injuries were reported. The Transportation Safety Board sent two inspectors to the site to investigate the incident.

On June 17, 2016, a runaway train incident occurred at the yard, in which 74 rail cars — one of them carrying dangerous goods — rolled away uncontrolled for five kilometres, continuing outside the yard onto the mainline. The TSB said that ground crews were using a remote control device known widely in the industry as a "belt pack" to assemble a train when the 72 loaded cars as well as two empty ones rolled away uncontrolled.

On May 12, 2017, a derailment caused a chemical spill. At around 11:30 p.m. ET, a locomotive derailed and "sideswiped" seven hopper cars. The impact resulted in a spill of a powdered form of terephthalic acid, a compound used in the manufacturing of plastics.

On August 15, 2019, another derailment caused the death of a worker. At around 2 a.m. ET, emergency services were called. They found a CN worker trapped beneath a rail car that had derailed and fallen on its side. The employee died as a result of injuries sustained in the incident.
