= Maple, Ontario =

Maple
- Neighbourhood
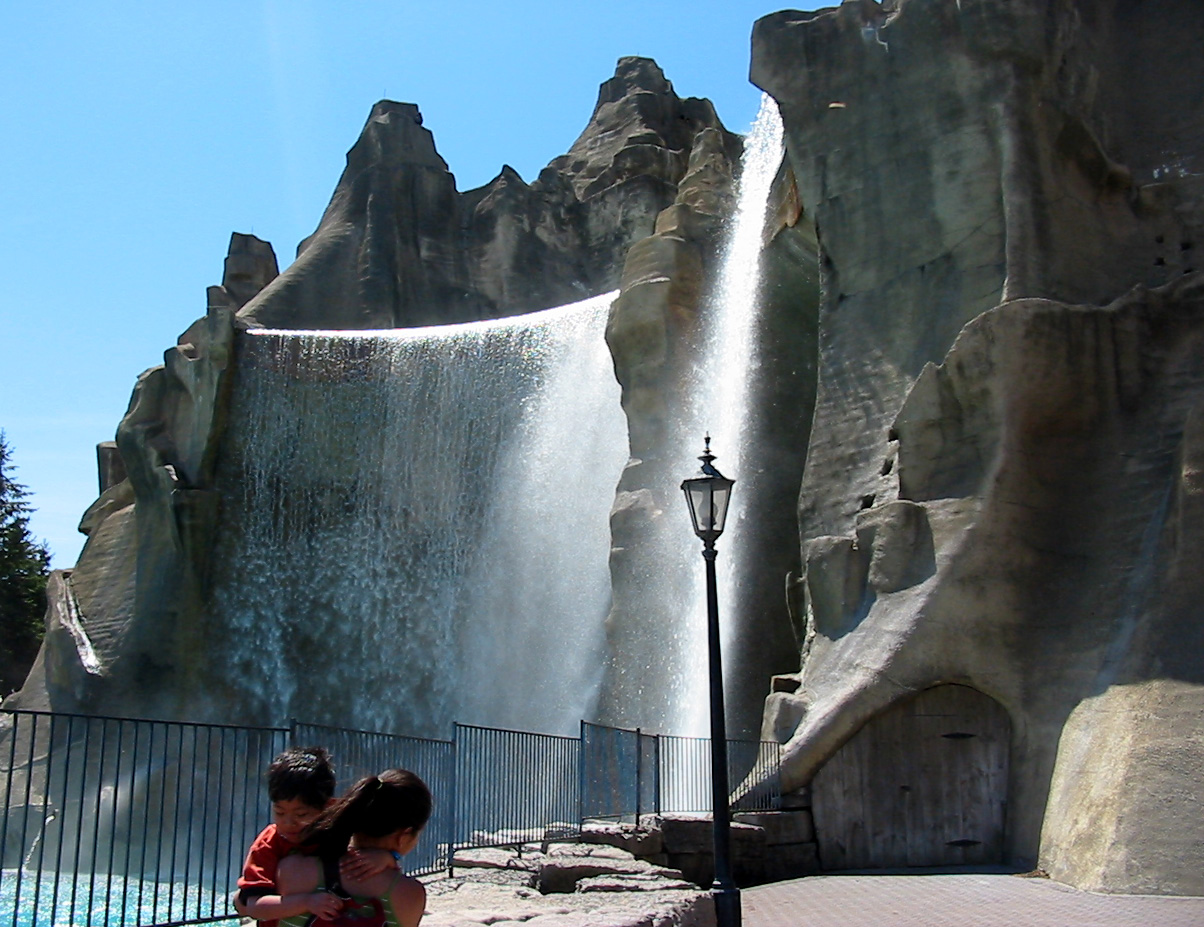
- Wonder Mountain at Canada's Wonderland

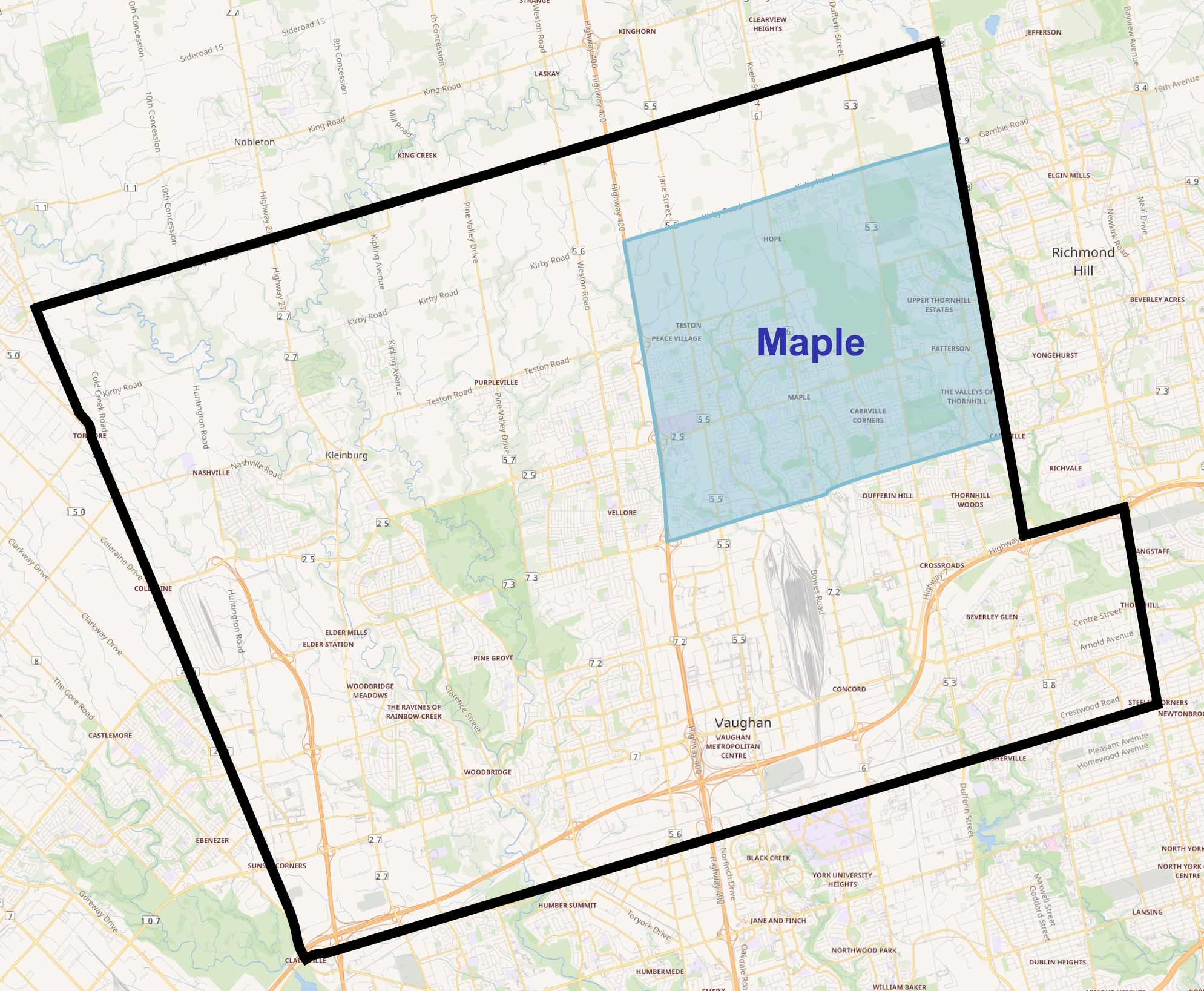
- Maple within Vaughan
- Coordinates: 43°51′14″N 79°30′47″W
- Country: Canada
- Province: Ontario
- Regional municipality: York Region
- City: Vaughan
- Settled: 1852
- Incorporated: 1882 (Police village)
- Changed Municipality: 1971 York Region from York County
- Amalgamated: 1971 into Vaughan (as Town) 1990 (as City)

Government
  - MP: Anna Roberts (King—Vaughan)
  - MPP: Stephen Lecce (King—Vaughan)
  - Councillors: Marilyn Iafrate (Ward 1); Chris Ainsworth (Ward 4)
- Postal code: L6A
- NTS Map: 30M13 Bolton
- GNBC Code: FDKOV

Maple is a large neighbourhood in Vaughan, York Region, Ontario, Canada, north of Toronto. It was founded as a small village, located at the intersection of Major Mackenzie Drive and Keele Street.

== Geography ==
Maple is located across Highway 400 from Woodbridge and still-rural areas of Vaughan to the southwest and northwest respectively, and Concord to the south across Rutherford Road. To the east it forms the city's boundary along Bathurst Street, across from the City of Richmond Hill. The northern part of Maple is still largely rural and contains the communities of Hope and Teston, although industrial development is occurring along the Highway 400 corridor east to Jane Street, and there are some residential areas along Keele. North of Maple lies a fully rural area which continues 2 km north to Vaughan's city limits with King Township.

The Oak Ridges Moraine, which is the source of many watercourses in the Greater Toronto Area, runs through the northeast. The west branch of the Don River rises to the northwest in the moraine and flows through Maple.

== Transportation ==
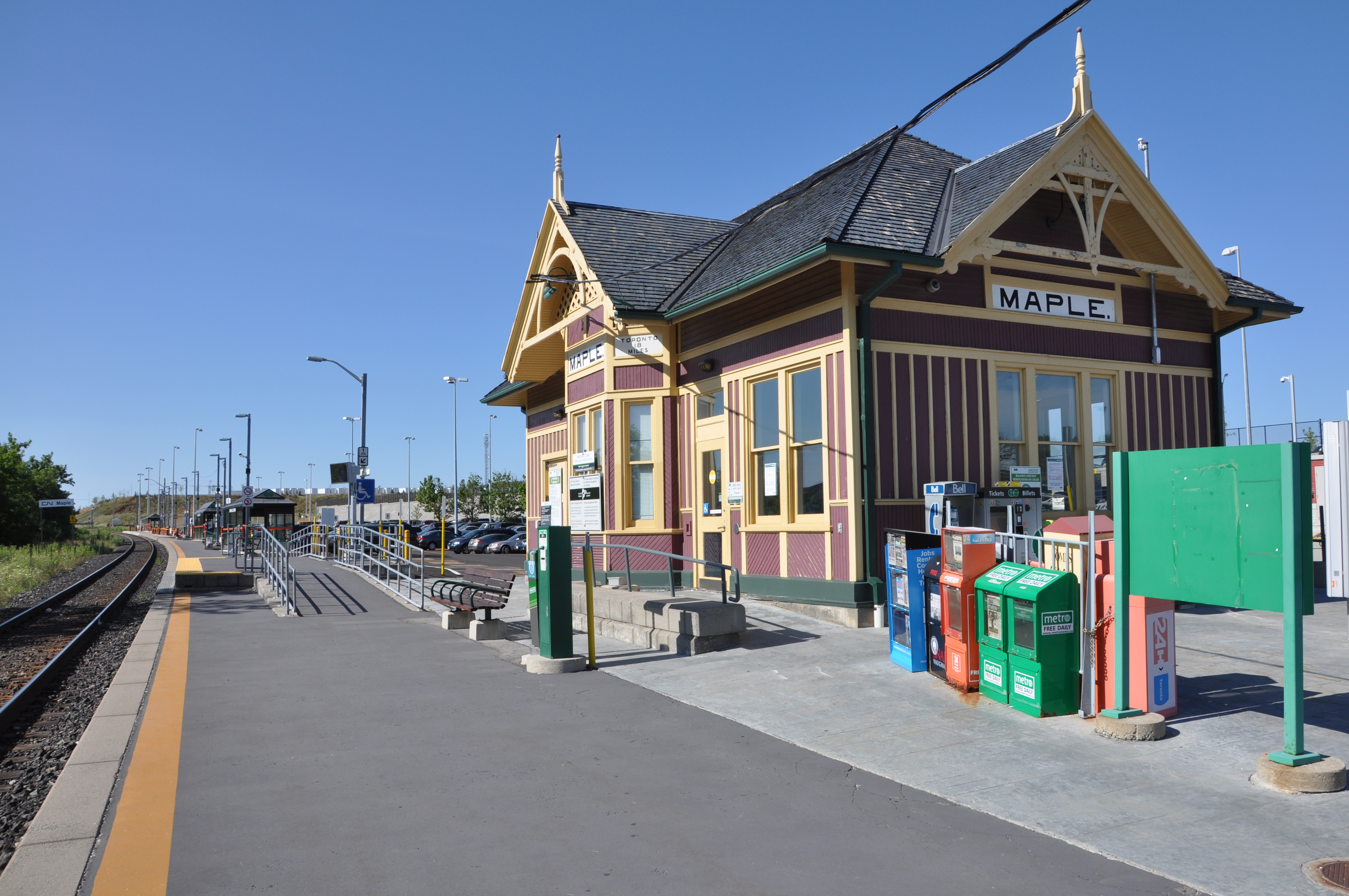
The building at the Maple GO Station is a federally designated heritage railway station

Keele Street and Major Mackenzie Drive are the cross streets of the original historic village. Major Mackenzie has an interchange with Highway 400 in the west, as does Rutherford Road 2 km to the south, at the district's southwestern corner.

Maple is served by GO Transit's Barrie line; stopping at Maple and Rutherford GO stations. GO also runs commuter bus routes. The Maple GO Station, built in 1903 by the Grand Trunk Railroad, is a federally designated a heritage railway station.

Public transit service is provided by York Region Transit (YRT). Major north-south trunk routes serve Jane Street (20 Jane), Keele Street (107 Keele and 96 Keele-Yonge), and Dufferin Street (105 Dufferin; only serving Maple (north of Rutherford Road) during weekdays with no late evening service). East-west trunk routes serve Rutherford (85 Rutherford) and Major Mackenzie Drive (4 Major Mackenzie). There are also three lesser routes providing service along various side streets.

== History ==
The founding families of Maple were the Noble and the Rupert families. The Nobles settled around the present Major Mackenzie Drive and Keele Street intersection in the early half of the 19th century. In 1852 the village was called Noble's Corner after Joseph Noble, the first Postmaster. Later, a Doctor Rupert lived in Maple and was such a respected member of the community that the town's name was changed to Rupertsville. Local folklore associates the name "Maple" with the numerous maple trees once found along Keele Street in the village. Maple was dominated for most of the 19th century by the more prosperous nearby communities of Sherwood and Teston (today both within Maple). Keele Street was then in very poor condition and forced most travelers to take alternate routes.

Once the Ontario, Huron, and Simcoe Railway (reorganized as the Northern Railway of Canada in 1858) built a line through Maple in the early 1850s, the town began to grow. The station (originally called Richmond Hill) was opened in 1853, and a stage coach was run from Richmond Hill to Maple to connect with the station. The Grand Trunk Railway (later Canadian National Railway) bought the line in early 1900, and after the station burnt down in 1904, a new station was built and renamed Maple.

Maple, as a centre of agriculture, was enhanced with the proximity of the railway and later began to grow in population due to its proximity to then-Metropolitan Toronto (now Toronto). A major Ontario Department of Lands and Forests office was situated there in the 1960s. Small housing developments began in the 1960s in the southwest, as well as replacement of homes damaged in the August 1962 fire and explosion at an industrial propane depot. Larger housing developments began in the 1980s in the northwest, near McNaughton.

Maple was amalgamated with nearby communities and Vaughan Township to form the Town of Vaughan in 1971. Vaughan was incorporated as a city in 1991.

Canada's Wonderland, a large amusement park, opened in 1981 on a large parcel of former Maple farmland along the west side of Highway 400.

In 1983 the Keele Valley Landfill was opened on the site of a former gravel pit north of Major Mackenzie, east of the CN line to Dufferin Street. It was owned and operated by Metropolitan Toronto, and later by the City of Toronto. The Keele Valley Landfill was closed on December 31, 2002 after it reached its capacity. Part of the site was developed into the Eagle's Nest Golf Course, and other developments will occur in the future once the buried waste decomposes sufficiently.

Maple formerly had a small airport in the west, the Maple Airport, which closed in 1987. Many streets in the residential area later built on the site were named after aircraft makes and models such as Avro, Lockheed, and Mustang.

Maple's proximity to Toronto and its major transportation corridors, have led to the heavy development and population growth. In 1993, housing development began in the area of what was former airport. In 1995, it expanded to the west. Between 1997 and 1999, urban developments reached the northwestern part of Maple and Melville and the Don to the GO line. Developments also reached to the northeastern and southeastern parts. Estate housing began developing northeast of the original village near Dufferin Street in the late-1990s. The housing developments began up to the Highway 400 in the northwest.

By 2000, developments reached the western part as far as Highway 400, Teston Road, the GO line, and the southwest. These included one of the largest mosques in Canada, the Baitul Islam Mosque, which is located on Jane Street south of Teston Road, where a planned subdivision named Peace Village was established in 1999. Development is still ongoing in the northwest north of Teston between Highway 400 and Jane, around the former hamlet of Teston.

== Political ==
Maple is within the Ontario provincial electoral riding of King-Vaughan, and the MPP is Stephen Lecce. Maple is in the federal riding of King-Vaughan and the MP is Anna Roberts.

== Nearest communities ==
- Concord, south
- Woodbridge, west
- Kleinburg, north west
- King City, north
- Richmond Hill, east
- Thornhill, southeast

== Notable people ==
- Max Aitken, better known as First Baron Beaverbrook, was born in the St Andrew's Presbyterian Church Manse in 1879. His father left for a congregation in Newcastle New Brunswick the following year. There is a plaque outside the Church, noting that as Lord Beaverbrook, he donated a carillon.
- Massimo Bertocchi, Olympic decathlete.
- Luca Caputi - ice hockey player IK Oskarshamn of the Swedish HockeyAllsvenskan
- Kevin Connolly - writer
- Justin DiBenedetto - ice hockey player
- Phil Di Giuseppe - ice hockey player drafted into the NHL as the 38th draft pick in 2012 by the Carolina Hurricanes.
- Lucas Lessio - ice hockey player drafted into the NHL as the 56th draft pick in 2011 by the Phoenix Coyotes.
- Mendelson Joe - artist was raised in Maple.
- Adam Mascherin - ice hockey player
- Tyler Medeiros - a teen singer born in Maple.
- David Ostella - racing driver
- Andi Petrillo - sports anchor was raised in Maple.
- Martina Sorbara, lead singer and songwriter of Juno-Award-winning band Dragonette; grew up on a farm in Maple.
