= CN Halton Subdivision =

Halton Subdivision

Overview
- Status: Operational
- Owner: Canadian National Railway
- Locale: Greater Toronto Area, Ontario, Canada
- Termini: MacMillan Yard, Vaughan; Burlington West, Burlington
- Stations: Bramalea; Brampton; Mount Pleasant; Georgetown

Service
- Type: Heavy rail
- System: Canadian National Railway
- Services: Kitchener; Sarnia–Toronto Corridor
- Operator(s): Canadian National Railway (freight); GO Transit (commuter rail); Via Rail (intercity rail)

Technical
- Line length: 49.4 mi (79.5 km)
- Track gauge: 1,435 mm (4 ft 8 1/2 in) standard gauge

The CN Halton Subdivision is a major railway line in Southern Ontario, Canada. It is owned and operated by the Canadian National Railway (CN).

== Route description ==
The Halton Subdivision is 49.4 miles (79.5 km) long and runs generally northeast–southwest. Milepoint 0 is in Vaughan, at the line's junction with the CN York Subdivision near CN's MacMillan Yard. At grade, it runs approximately west–southwest until it crosses over the (underground) Line 1 Yonge–University of the Toronto subway at Snider West (milepoint 1.2), just south of Highway 407 station. It crosses Jane Street (which passes under the line using a subway), Highway 400 and Weston Road (which cross over the line with bridges) and Pine Valley Drive and Islington Avenue (which cross under the line with subways). It crosses over the Canadian Pacific Railway's MacTier Subdivision with a flyover immediately before crossing the Humber River at milepoint 4.3 and angling further south. At the municipal border between Vaughan and Toronto, it descends into a tunnel below the intersection of Steeles Avenue with Martin Grove Road. It retains its slightly sunken character as it is crossed by the former Highway 27, Albion Road, Highway 427, and Indian Line with bridges, curving slightly further south at Highway 427.

Goreway (milepoint 8.8) marks the beginning of the wye that leads to CN's Brampton Intermodal Terminal. Exiting the wye, the next significant feature is CN's Malport Yard at milepoint 9.7. At Torbram (milepoint 10.5) the main line crosses over Torbram Road while a lead track curves to the east to meet the Weston Subdivision. The main line curves to the west and meets with the Weston Subdivision at Halwest (milepoint 11.1). These tracks along with the section of the Weston Subdivision between the two junctions form a wye known as Halwest Junction, which straddles the Mississauga–Brampton municipal boundary.

Continuing approximately west by south, the line passes under Highway 407 and Bramalea Road, then reaches Bramalea at milepoint 11.6. It passes under Steeles Avenue East immediately west of the station, then over Dixie Road through a heavily industrialized area of Brampton, with numerous industrial spurs junctioning with the main line. It then passes under West Drive and Highway 410 and over Rutherford Road South and Kennedy Road South. At Peel (milepoint 14.3), the line crosses over Centre Street South and then Etobicoke Creek, before reaching one of its last remaining level crossings in the Brampton–Mississauga area, at John Street. It then crosses over Queen Street East, Union Street, and Main Street North before arriving at Brampton, which is milepoint 15.4.

West of the station, it crosses Mill Street North at grade before reaching a diamond crossing with the Orangeville-Brampton Railway (OBRY) at milepoint 15.6. It crosses over Fletcher's Creek and McLaughlin Road North, then under Chinguacousy Road, Williams Parkway, and Bovaird Drive West, before arriving at Mount Pleasant and milepoint 18.9 (Norval, distinct from the community of Norval to the southwest). After crossing Mississauga Road at grade, it enters farmland, crossing Heritage Road and Winston Churchill Boulevard (which marks the Peel–Halton regional boundary) at grade. It reaches the Credit River at milepoint 22.5, crossing it and passing under Maple Avenue and Mountainview Road North before arriving at Georgetown, which is milepoint 23.5.

Immediately to the west of Georgetown is Silver Junction at milepoint 24.1, which is where the Halton Subdivision connects to the Guelph Subdivision, the latter of which continues on with a slight southerly curve. The Halton Subdivision crosses Main Street North and curves significantly southwards, crossing over Princess Anne Drive, then crossing Trafalgar Road and 17 Side Road at grade to the west of their intersection. It crosses Black Creek, then reaches Stewarttown at milepoint 26.4 before crossing 15 Side Road at grade immediately west of its intersection with Sixth Line. It curves slightly west, crossing Fifth Line, then reaches Speyside at milepoint 28.0 before crossing Middle Sixteen Mile Creek twice. It crosses Fourth Line at grade, then curves slightly southward, crosses 10 Side Road, and curves east, reaching the municipal boundary between Halton Hills and Milton at a level crossing with 5 Side Road and arriving at Mansewood, which is milepoint 32.3. James Snow Parkway passes over it with a bridge as it passes through an industrial area of Milton, with several industrial spurs. The line passes under Highway 401 and curves to the west, arriving at Milbase, which is milepoint 34.3. It curves east again before crossing over Steeles Avenue East and the Canadian Pacific Railway's Galt Subdivision, which is CP's mainline connecting Toronto and Southwestern Ontario.

The line continues southeast through a residential area of Milton, crossing over Main Street West and Derry Road, then under Louis St. Laurent Avenue. Returning to farmland, it crosses Britannia Road at grade and reaches Ash (linked to the planned CN Milton Logistics Hub) at milepoint 39.5. It then crosses Lower Base Line West at grade before curving nearly due south and crossing Tremaine Road at grade. It crosses Side Road 1 (also the Milton–Burlington municipal boundary) at grade, then passes over Highway 407 and Bronte Creek, reaching Tansley at milepoint 43.1. Running through a suburban area of Burlington, it passes under Dundas Street, then over Sheldon Creek, Appleby Line, the Upper Middle Road, Appleby Creek, Shareacres Creek, and crossing Mainway at grade, curving slightly west. It reaches an industrial area of Burlington, then crosses over Walkers Line and Tuck Creek, continuing to curve west. Nearing its terminus, it runs parallel to the Queen Elizabeth Way, crossing under Guelph Line, North Service Road, and then the Queen Elizabeth Way itself as it curves south and west again, crossing under Plains Road East and over Brant Street to meet the CN Oakville Subdivision at Burlington West junction at milepoint 49.4, the southern terminus of the line, which is directly southwest of the Burlington GO station.

== History ==
=== Precursor lines ===
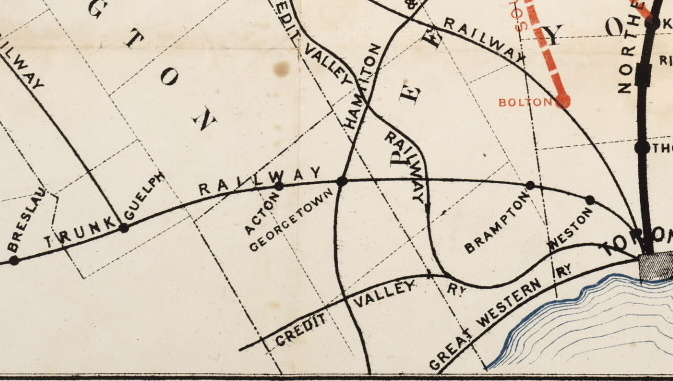
Rail lines around Georgetown c. 1877, showing the Grand Trunk (east–west) and Hamilton and North-Western (north–south) lines.

==== North Main Line section ====
The east–west-aligned middle section of the Halton Subdivision was built in the 1850s by the Grand Trunk Railway. Initially a line to the villages of Weston and Georgetown west of Toronto, it was extended through Guelph and Kitchener (then known as Berlin) by 1856, then further extended westward to Sarnia via St. Marys Junction. With the construction of the Credit Valley Railway line through Milton and Galt, as well as the Grand Trunk's acquisition of the Great Western Railway, whose east–west mainline (the "South Main Line") ran through Brantford, this "North Main Line" was soon overshadowed.

The line was used for passenger services from the start, which were usually long-distance trains connecting to points east via Toronto, or points west via London (and further west via Windsor/Detroit and Sarnia/Port Huron).

After the amalgamation and restructuring of the Grand Trunk into the Canadian National Railways, the line was a part of the CN Brampton Subdivision, which comprised the section of the North Main Line between Toronto and Stratford. Its part of the Brampton Subdivision was managed under CN's Stratford Division. In the 1950s–60s, CN began relocating its freight operations to what was then an area north of urban Toronto, which involved the construction of the CN York Subdivision and MacMillan Yard to relocate traffic away from the Railway Lands in downtown Toronto. In 1964–65, the Brampton Subdivision was reorganized, with the eastern part (milepoint 0.0 to 17.0) becoming the Weston Subdivision, the western part (milepoint 30.0 to 88.6) becoming a part of the Guelph Subdivision, and the central part (milepoint 17.0 to 30.0) becoming a part of the Halton Subdivision, running northeast to the newly opened MacMillan Yard.

CN began the first recognizable commuter services along the line in the 1950s between Guelph and Toronto, with one eastbound morning run and a westbound afternoon return. GO Transit rail service along the line began in 1974 and was originally known as the Georgetown line, which is where it terminated. It soon replaced the Guelph–Toronto commuter run, which was discontinued the following year, though this led to a temporary end to commuter rail service to Guelph. By the end of the 1970s, all remaining Canadian National passenger services were either discontinued or transferred to a new crown agency, Via Rail.

==== Hamilton and North-Western section ====
The southern section of the Halton Subdivision, between Georgetown and Burlington West, was formerly a part of the Hamilton and North-Western Railway. That section of the line opened to traffic around 1876, and at its fullest extent, reached as far as Barrie. The Hamilton and North-Western merged with the Northern Railway of Canada in 1879 to form the Northern and Northwestern Railway, then became a part of the Grand Trunk conglomerate in 1888, and was inherited with it into the Canadian National Railways in 1923. It became known as the CN Milton Subdivision. With the reorganization of CN lines in the 1960s, the northern section became the Beeton Subdivision, and the southern became a part of the Halton Subdivision. The connection between the two subdivisions at Georgetown was severed and the Beeton Subdivision was eventually shut down completely through successive abandonments starting in 1975.

=== Recent history ===
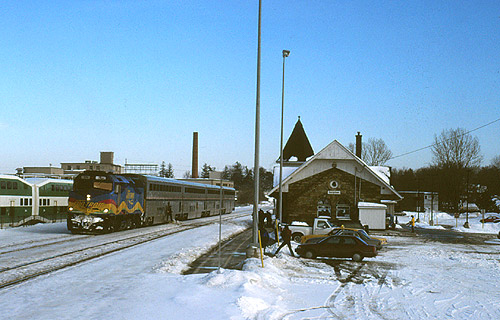
The International at Georgetown in 1999. A GO train is visible to the left.

In 1990, the International was re-routed along the North Main Line between London and Toronto, travelling along the central part of the Halton Subdivision. It was one of the last remnants of the Grand Trunk's long-distance express passenger train system, which throughout the 20th century had gradually decayed. With the reorganization of American passenger trains under Amtrak, the train (which previously had run along the South Main Line) was discontinued for a time before being revived as a joint Amtrak–Via Rail operation in the 1980s. The re-routing gave North Main Line communities their first direct international passenger rail service in years, but added an hour to the International's travel time. Ultimately, in 2004, the International was severed at the border as it had been before its restoration, with its American component remaining as Amtrak's Blue Water and the Canadian component as the single daily Toronto–Sarnia train operated by Via Rail.

From the early 1990s to late 2010s, plans were made to eliminate the last two remaining level crossings with arterial roads along the line in the urban area of Peel Region, with both projects jointly funded by the cities of Mississauga and Brampton. The crossings were at the boundaries of the two cities at Torbram Road and Goreway Drive. Torbram Road would have its level crossings with both the Halton and Weston subdivisions (which are nearly adjacent there) replaced with underpasses. The total cost of the Torbram project (which also included funding from CN and Metrolinx) was estimated at $89.4 million, though project delays led to a budget increase of $10.8 million. Both underpasses opened in 2019.

Construction of the overpass at Goreway Drive to replace its level crossing began in 2023. The project cost $40 million, with the bridge opening to traffic in October 2025.

Ongoing urbanization in Brampton led to another overpass being constructed at Mississauga Road, which opened in early 2026. The bridge was designed to accommodate future additional tracks for the Kitchener GO line.

== Operations ==
The Halton Subdivision is Canada's fourth busiest rail line by volume of traffic. It is considered a major freight artery which is "important for both CN freight operations and the overall Ontario economy," according to a 2021 Metrolinx report. It is used by both freight and passenger trains, though much of the line is used exclusively for freight. The section used for passenger service is an east–west stretch (part of the historic CN North Main Line) running through Brampton and Halton Hills. As of 2021, passenger services along the line consist of Via Rail's daily intercity Toronto–Sarnia train (part of the Québec City–Windsor Corridor), which stops at the Brampton and Georgetown railway stations, as well as weekday regional/commuter trains operating as part of GO Transit's Kitchener line, which also stop at Bramalea and Mount Pleasant.

Since the start of GO Transit rail service in 1974, the frequency of GO trains has gradually increased, especially following service expansions in the 2010s. Metrolinx, the parent agency of GO Transit, proposed a freight bypass in the mid-2010s to create more room in the schedule for additional passenger trains along the existing section of the Halton Subdivision. By 2021, Metrolinx had decided against pursuing the freight bypass in favour of greater co-production with CN in utilizing the existing line. In 2019, boardings at stations on the Halton Subdivision increased from 10,590 to 11,080 per weekday compared to 2018, an increase of 5%. 1,140 of these were on newly added train trips.

== Facilities ==
Major facilities include the Malport Freight Yard in Malton, the Brampton Intermodal Terminal in Brampton, and intersections with several other rail lines, including the Orangeville Brampton Railway.

Located next to the subdivision at 7 Blair Drive (former Debro Steel) is Alstom's final assembly plant for Alstom Citadis Spirit LRVs for the Finch West, Hurontario, and Eglinton Crosstown light rail lines.

== See also ==
- Rail transport in Ontario
