= Teston, Vaughan =

Teston
- Neighbourhood
- Interactive map of Teston
- Coordinates: 43°52′10″N 79°32′26″W
- Country: Canada
- Province: Ontario
- Regional municipality: York
- City: Vaughan
- Time zone: UTC-5 (EST)
  - Summer (DST): UTC-4 (EDT)
- Area codes: 905 and 289
- NTS Map: 030M13
- GNBC Code: FCVNX

Teston is a suburban neighbourhood and former hamlet located at the intersection of Teston Road and Jane Street, in the City of Vaughan, Ontario, at the northern edge of the city's developed area. The Teston United Church and some homes of early settlers are still standing to this day, but the rapid development of Vaughan has impacted the area in recent years.

In early 2005, the Teston United Church was unsuccessfully relocated, meaning that lifting and flotation to an alternate site could not be accomplished. Parts of the church were distributed before it was completely demolished. The only visible remnants of the hamlet today run from Kleinberg to Keele Street, and continue east of Maple, eventually becoming Elgin Mills Road at Bathurst Street.

In 2010, a major archeological discovery was made on the south side of the road, as road crews discovered an aboriginal burial ground just east of Jane Street.
