= Keele Street =

Street in Toronto and York Region in Ontario, Canada

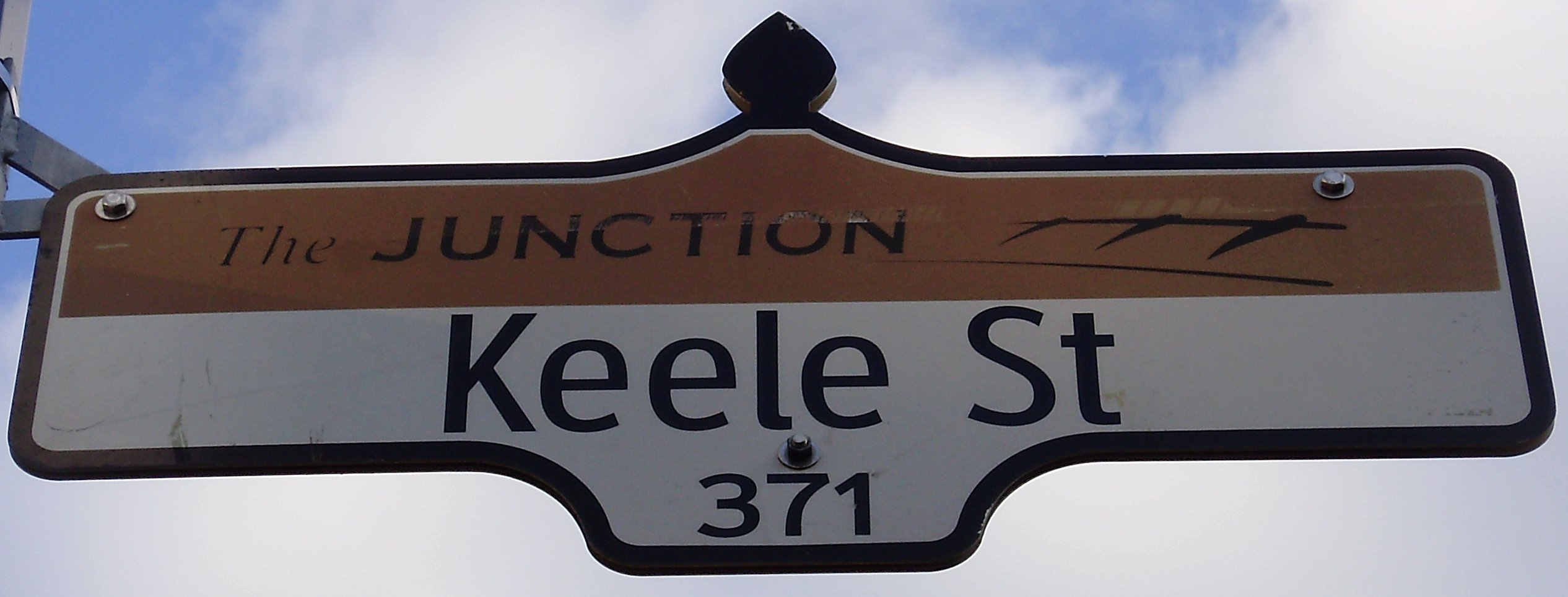
- York Regional Road 6
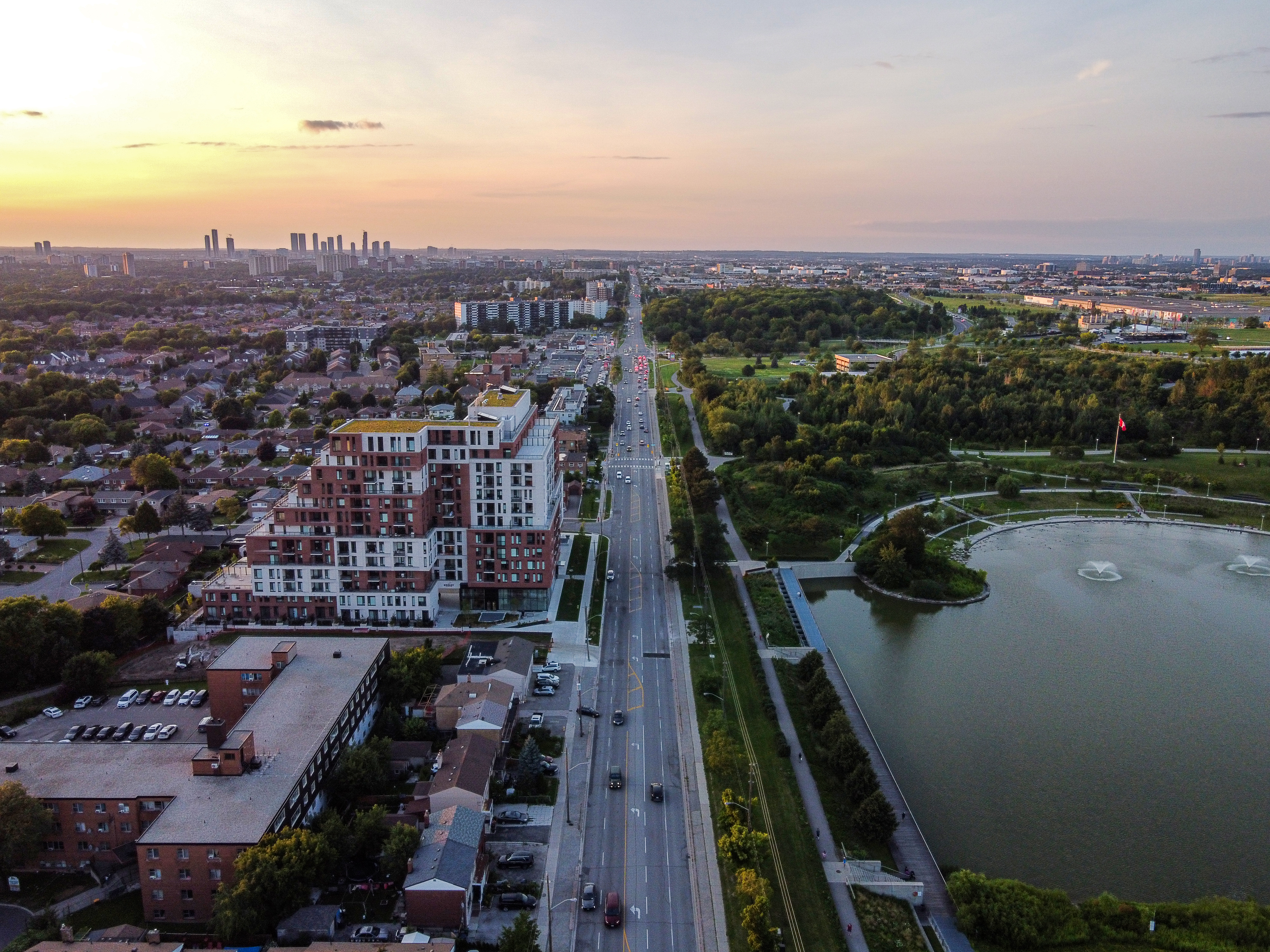
- Keele Street near Downsview Park

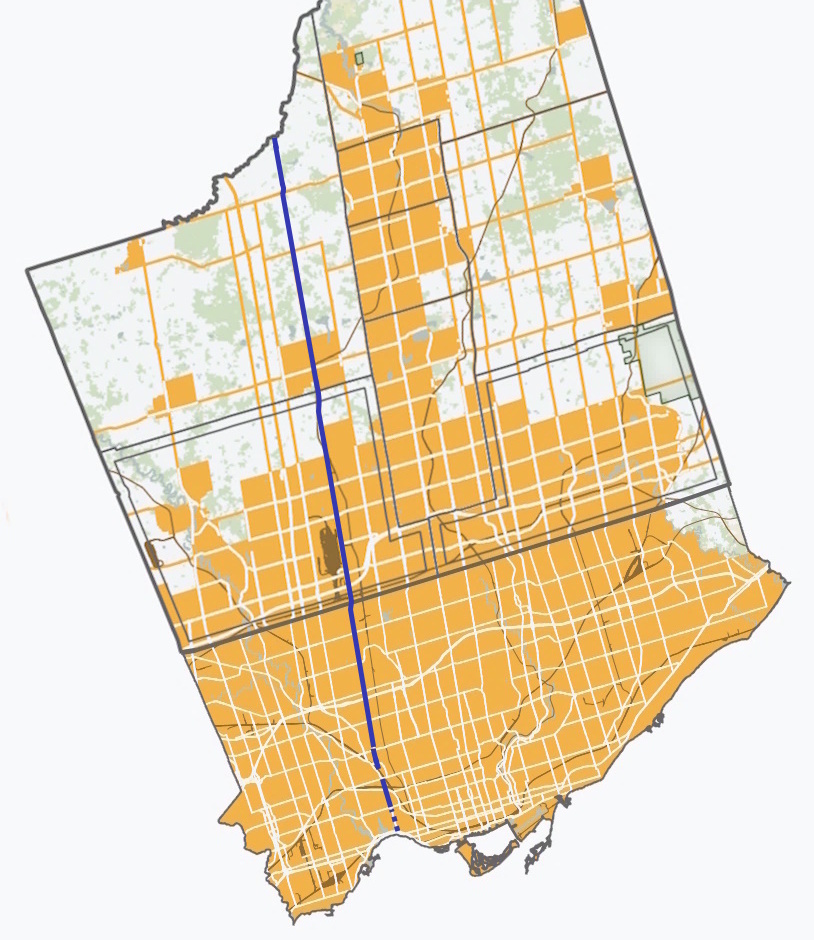
- Route of Keele Street through Toronto and York Region (blue line), including Parkside Drive, a former section (short dashed line)
- Maintained by: City of Toronto; York Region; Township of King
- Location: Toronto, Vaughan, King
- South end: Bloor Street in Toronto (continues as Parkside Drive)
- Major junctions: St. Clair Avenue —Subsumed by Weston Rd.— Rogers Road; Eglinton Avenue; Lawrence Avenue; Highway 401; Sheppard Avenue; Finch Avenue; Steeles Avenue; Highway 407; Highway 7 Langstaff Road; Rutherford Road; Major Mackenzie Drive; King-Vaughan Road; King Road; 15th Sideroad; Lloydtown-Aurora Road; Davis Drive
- North end: Holland Marsh in King

Other
Nearby arterial roads
← Jane Street; Black Creek Drive	Dufferin Street →

Keele Street is a north–south road in Toronto and York Region in Ontario, Canada. It stretches 47 kilometres (29 mi), running from Bloor Street in Toronto to the Holland Marsh. It begins at Bloor Street, as a continuation of Parkside Drive, which was originally part of Keele. Another former section is a short rural road separated from the road's northern terminus by the west branch of the Holland River within Bradford-West Gwillimbury in Simcoe County, now named Keele Lane. Keele runs along a former concession road (Third Line West of Yonge Street) allowance.

== Route description ==
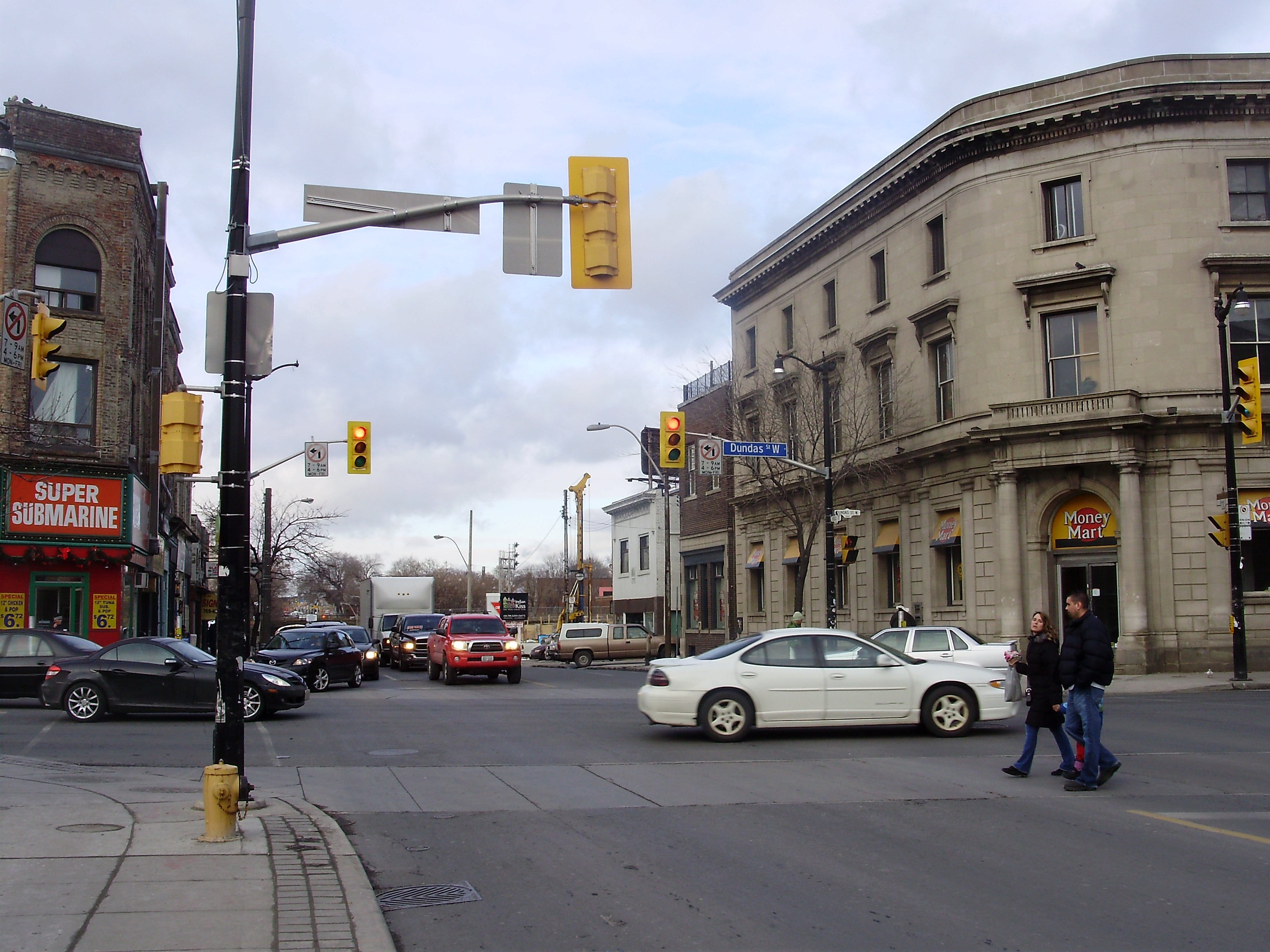
Keele and Dundas Streets in the Junction

Parkside Drive begins at Lake Shore Boulevard near Sunnyside Beach, site of the former Sunnyside Amusement Park. It runs north forming the eastern boundary of High Park until Bloor Street. To the east is the Roncesvalles neighbourhood.

North of Bloor, the present Keele Street proper begins. It then runs through the residential High Park North neighbourhood and into The Junction, which contains a mix of residential and industrial areas centred around railway lines. It passes under the Canadian Pacific Kansas City (CPKC) Galt Subdivision east of the West Toronto Yard. Upon reaching St. Clair Avenue, the first section of Keele defaults into Weston Road. While originally continuing straight north, today Keele breaks at the site of a former rail yard (since closed and redeveloped) and another rail corrodor shared between the CPKC and Canadian National (CN), near the former Canada Packers stockyards.

It resumes south of Eglinton Avenue, intersecting Rogers Road, and entering the York district. At Eglinton, there is a minor, but complicated jog: A short stretch of Keele itself is a bypassed side street north of it, with through traffic from the south defaulting onto Trethewey Drive, then shortly after turning at Yore Road which curves sharply left to become the third section of Keele Street after the bypassed section meets it. The street continues through suburban neighbourhoods in the York and then North York districts such as Silverthorn, Amesbury, Maple Leaf, and Downsview. North of Highway 401 it passes by Downsview Airport and forms the border between the residential neighbourhoods to the west and the large Keele-Finch industrial area to the east. Keele then passes York University to the west.

North of Steeles Avenue, Keele enters the City of Vaughan in York Region and continues to pass through industrial areas in the Concord district. It runs to the east of the MacMillan Yard, Canada's largest rail yard. North of Rutherford Road to north of Major Mackenzie Drive, Keele Street is the main street for Maple, once an independent village, but today a rapidly growing suburban area. North of Maple, Keele Street becomes largely rural and enters King Township, but remains four lanes wide until passing through King City as its main street. North of there, it narrows to two lanes. The road ends as a dead-end gravel road at the Holland River, across from Keele Lane, another former section.

== History ==
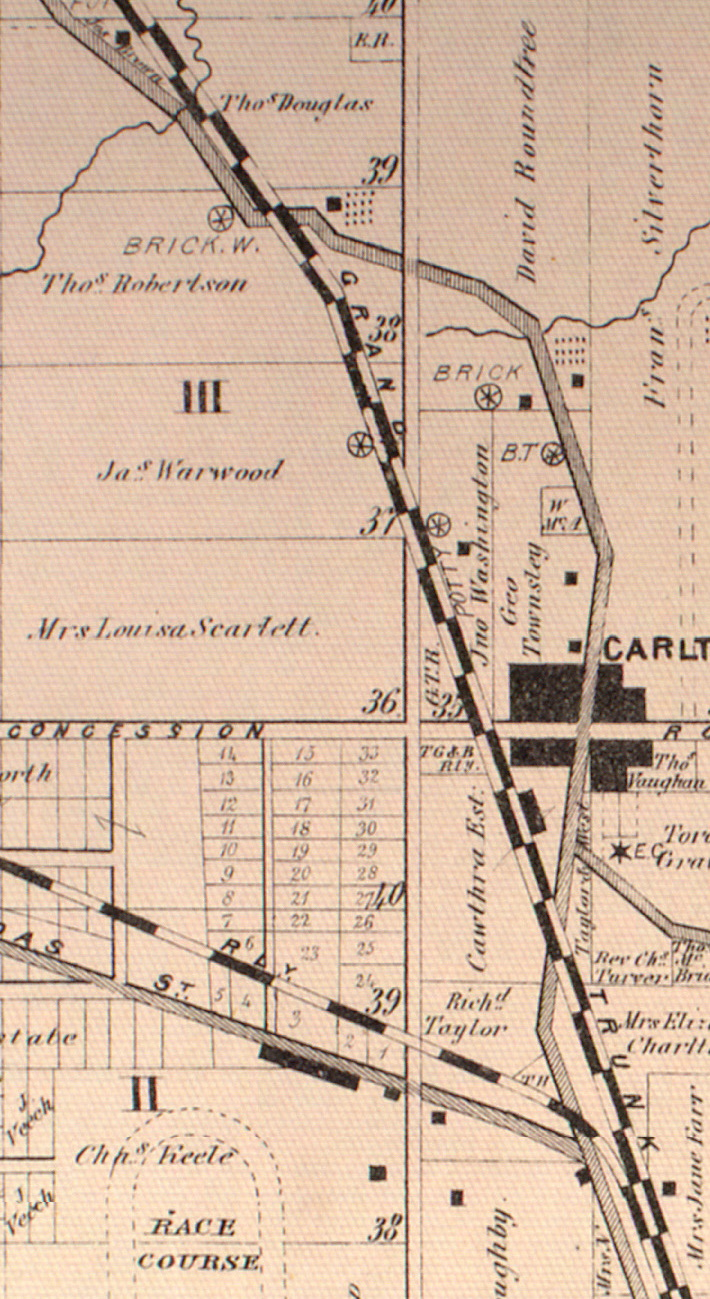
1880 map showing the original unbroken course of Keele Street, as well as the original course of Weston Road, today Old Weston Road, near what is today St. Clair Avenue

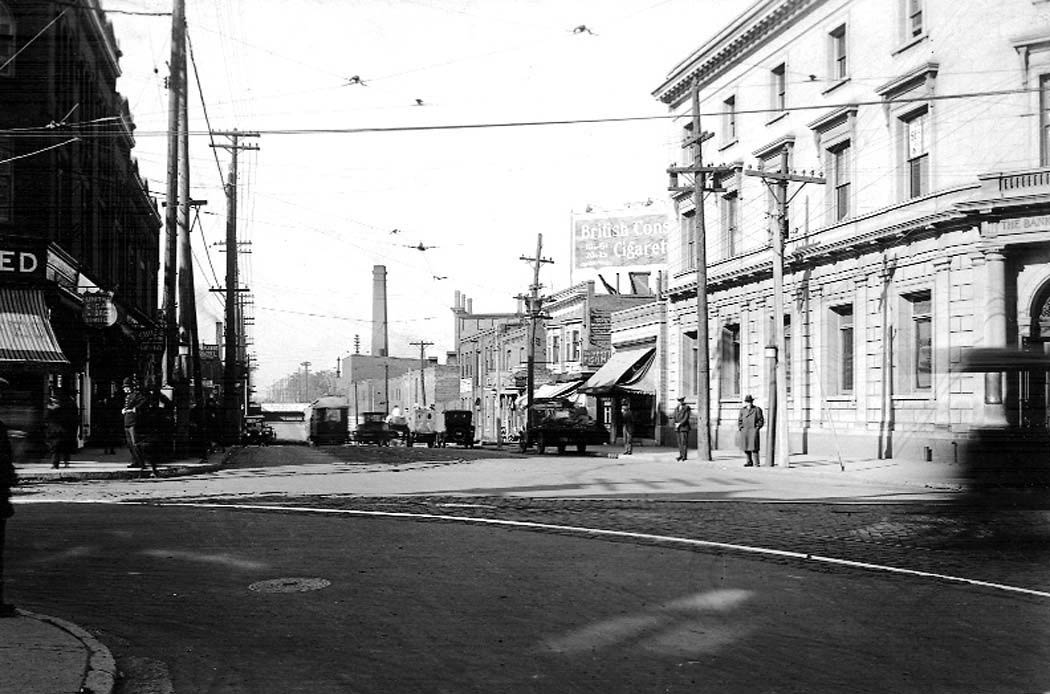
Keele and Dundas Streets in 1923

The street is named for local businessman and farmer William Conway Keele, who lived in what is today West Toronto Junction or the Lambton Mills area.

Keele Street's continuation south of Bloor Street, Parkside Drive, was originally part of Keele, but was renamed in 1921 by the City of Toronto. The street originally continued through between St. Clair and Eglinton Avenues, but construction of the aforementioned railyards cut it off from the section farther north, although a 55-metre (180 foot) section north of St. Clair was channelled into a new route of Weston Road. This short stretch of Keele was redesignated as part of Weston in 2006.

At Steeles Avenue, a jog in the road at the boundary between the-then North York and Vaughan Townships was connected in the early 1960s.

== Public transit ==
A portion of Keele was once part of an interurban and later a streetcar line. The Toronto Suburban Railway was an interurban line which ran along Keele from Dundas West to Weston Road to connect to Lambton, Weston, and Woodbridge. The Toronto Transit Commission (TTC) took over the Toronto Suburban Railway routes in the 1920s and retained the more urban southern portion in York Township as a streetcar line and ran it on behalf of the township. The streetcar lines were converted to buses in the late 1940s. In 1977, trolley buses began plying Keele when the portion of the 89 Weston bus that serves it between Bloor Street (Keele subway station) to north of St. Clair Avenue was converted from diesel bus operation, but was changed back in 1992, the year before the TTC abandoned its entire trolley bus system.

Keele Street passes three TTC subway stations along its course through the city: The afforementioned Keele is situated at Bloor Street on the east–west Line 2 Bloor-Danforth, Finch West is located at Finch Avenue on the diagonal western leg of the north–south Line 1 Yonge-University and the eastern terminus of east–west Line 6 Finch West, and Keelesdale is located at Eglinton Avenue on Line 5 Eglinton, which is actually an underground light rail line.

Today, Keele is served by the TTC 41 Keele bus route, which runs from Keele station to Pioneer Village station via York University and its namesake station, and its counterpart night route, 341, running almost the same route, except for terminating at York University. There is also an express route operating during some periods, the 941 Keele express operating from Keele station to Finch West station.

The TTC 107 Alness–Chesswood operates from Finch West station to Canarctic Drive (just south of Steeles Avenue).

North of Steeles Avenue in York Region, York Region Transit (YRT) 107 Keele runs from Pioneer Village station to Teston Road in Vaughan.

It is also served by the YRT 96 Keele-Yonge Route, which runs north from Pioneer Village to King Road before travelling east on King Road before continuing north along Yonge Street to Newmarket where it terminates at the Newmarket Terminal.

== Landmarks ==
Landmark	Cross street	Notes	Image
High Park	Bloor Street West	One of the city's oldest parks (opened 1876) and largest park entirely within city limits.	
Keele station	Bloor Street West		
CPR West Toronto Yard	Dundas Street West	Yard opened in 1882.	
George Harvey Collegiate Institute	Rogers Road		
York Memorial Collegiate Institute	Eglinton Avenue West		
Hennick Humber Hospital, Keele Street Campus	Wilson Avenue	Formerly known as Humber River Hospital.	
Downsview Park	Sheppard Avenue West	Former airfield, now a park.	
Finch West station	Finch Avenue West		
York University	Steeles Avenue West	Toronto's second largest university.	
MacMillan Yard	Highway 7	Largest rail yard in Canada.	
Keele Valley Landfill	Major Mackenzie Drive West	Once Toronto's main landfill. Closed in 2002.	
King City GO Station	Station Road	Site of original King Railway Station c. 1852 (moved to King Township Museum 1989).	
All Saints, King City	King Road	Original church building opened in 1871.	
Hogan's Inn (Hogan's Inn At Four Corners)	King Road	Main building built 1851.	
St. Thomas of Villanova College	15th Sideroad		
Mary Lake Augustinian Monastery	15th Sideroad	Original summer home of Sir Henry Pellatt.	
