= List of Via Rail stations =

This is a list of stations with services provided by Via Rail.

Stations	Province	Service(s)	Connections
Abbotsford	BC	The Canadian	
Agassiz	BC	The Canadian	
Aldershot	ON	Maple Leaf Québec City–Windsor Corridor	GO Transit Amtrak
Alexandria	ON	Québec City–Windsor Corridor	
Aleza Lake	BC	Jasper–Prince Rupert	
Allanwater Bridge	ON	The Canadian	
Amery	MB	Winnipeg–Churchill	
Amherst	NS	The Ocean	
Amqui	QC	The Ocean	
Amyot	ON	Sudbury–White River	
Anjou	QC	Montreal–Senneterre Montreal–Jonquière	Exo
Armstrong	ON	The Canadian	
Ashcroft	BC	The Canadian	
Auden	ON	The Canadian	
Azilda	ON	Sudbury–White River	
Bathurst	NB	The Ocean	
Belleville	ON	Québec City–Windsor Corridor	
Bend	BC	Jasper–Prince Rupert	
Benny	ON	Sudbury–White River	
Biggar	SK	The Canadian	
Bima	QC	Montreal–Jonquière	
Bird	MB	Winnipeg–Churchill	
Biscotasing	ON	Sudbury–White River	
Blue River	BC	The Canadian	
Bolger	QC	Montreal–Senneterre	
Bolkow	ON	Sudbury–White River	
Boston Bar	BC	The Canadian	
Bourmont	QC	Montreal–Senneterre	
Brampton	ON	Québec City–Windsor Corridor	GO Transit
Brantford	ON	Québec City–Windsor Corridor	
Brereton Lake	MB	The Canadian	
Bridgar	MB	Winnipeg–Churchill	
Brockville	ON	Québec City–Windsor Corridor	
Brooks	QC	Montreal–Jonquière	
Burns Lake	BC	Jasper–Prince Rupert	
Campbellton	NB	The Ocean	
Cann	QC	Montreal–Senneterre	
Canora	SK	Winnipeg–Churchill	
Canyon	ON	The Canadian	
Capreol	ON	The Canadian	
Caramat	ON	The Canadian	
Caribou	QC	Montreal–Jonquière	
Cartier	ON	Sudbury–White River	
Casey	QC	Montreal–Senneterre	
Casselman	ON	Québec City–Windsor Corridor	
Cassiar Cannery	BC	Jasper–Prince Rupert	
Causapscal	QC	The Ocean	
Cedarvale	BC	Jasper–Prince Rupert	
Chambord	QC	Montreal–Jonquière	
Chapleau	ON	Sudbury–White River	
Charette	QC	Montreal–Senneterre Montreal–Jonquière	
Charlo	NB	The Ocean	
Charny	QC	Québec City–Windsor Corridor	
Chatham	ON	Québec City–Windsor Corridor	
Cherokee Station	QC	Montreal–Jonquière	
Chilliwack	BC	The Canadian	
Chelmsford	ON	Sudbury–White River	
Churchill	MB	Winnipeg–Churchill	
Clearwater	BC	The Canadian	
Dome Creek	BC	Jasper–Prince Rupert	
Dorreen	BC	Jasper–Prince Rupert	
Clova	QC	Montreal–Senneterre	
Club Beaudin	QC	Montreal–Senneterre	
Club Bélanger	QC	Montreal–Senneterre	
Club Grégorie	QC	Montreal–Jonquière	
Club Iroquois	QC	Montreal–Jonquière	
Club Jacques Cartier	QC	Montreal–Senneterre Montreal–Jonquière	
Club Kapitachuan	QC	Montreal–Senneterre	
Club Lizotte	QC	Montreal–Jonquière	
Club Maniwawa	QC	Montreal–Senneterre	
Club Nicol	QC	Montreal–Jonquière	
Club Rita	QC	Montreal–Senneterre	
Club Sisco	QC	Montreal–Senneterre	
Club Sommet	QC	Montreal–Jonquière	
Club Triton	QC	Montreal–Jonquière	
Club Vermillon	QC	Montreal–Senneterre	
Cobourg	ON	Québec City–Windsor Corridor	
Collins	ON	The Canadian	
Consolidated Bathurst	QC	Montreal–Senneterre	
Copelands Landing	ON	The Canadian	
Coquar	QC	Montreal–Senneterre	
Cormorant	MB	Winnipeg–Churchill	
Cornwall	ON	Québec City–Windsor Corridor	
Coteau	QC	Québec City–Windsor Corridor	
Cressman	QC	Montreal–Senneterre	
Da-Rou-Lac Lodge	QC	Montreal–Senneterre	
Dalton	ON	Sudbury–White River	
Dauphin	MB	Winnipeg–Churchill	
Dering	MB	Winnipeg–Churchill	
Dessane	QC	Montreal–Senneterre	
Devon	ON	Sudbury–White River	
Dix	QC	Montreal–Senneterre	
Dorval	QC	Québec City–Windsor Corridor	Exo
Drummondville	QC	The Ocean Québec City–Windsor Corridor	
Dunster	BC	Jasper–Prince Rupert	
Duplessis	QC	Montreal–Senneterre	
Dyce	MB	Winnipeg–Churchill	
Edmonton	AB	The Canadian	
Edson	AB	The Canadian	
Elma	MB	The Canadian	
Elsas	ON	The Canadian	
Endako	BC	Jasper–Prince Rupert	
Endeavour	SK	Winnipeg–Churchill	
Esher	ON	Sudbury–White River	
Evansburg	AB	The Canadian	
Fallowfield	ON	Québec City–Windsor Corridor	
Falrie	QC	Montreal–Jonquière	
Farlane	ON	The Canadian	
Felix	ON	The Canadian	
Ferguson	QC	Montreal–Senneterre	
Ferland	ON	The Canadian	
Fitzpatrick	QC	Montreal–Senneterre	
Flindt Landing	ON	The Canadian	
Foleyet	ON	The Canadian	
Forks	ON	Jasper–Prince Rupert	
Forsythe	QC	Montreal–Senneterre	
Fort Fraser	BC	Jasper–Prince Rupert	
Franz	ON	Sudbury–White River	
Gagnon	QC	Montreal–Senneterre	
Gananoque	ON	Québec City–Windsor Corridor	
Gare du Palais	QC	Québec City–Windsor Corridor	
Garneau	QC	Montreal–Senneterre Montreal–Jonquière	
Georgetown	ON	Québec City–Windsor Corridor	GO Transit
Gilbert Plains	MB	Winnipeg–Churchill	
Gillam	MB	Winnipeg–Churchill	
Girdwood	ON	Sudbury–White River	
Gladstone	MB	Winnipeg–Churchill	
Glencoe	ON	Québec City–Windsor Corridor	
Glenella	MB	Winnipeg–Churchill	
Goat River	BC	Jasper–Prince Rupert	
Gogama	ON	The Canadian	
Grand-Mère	QC	Montreal–Senneterre Montreal–Jonquière	
Grandview	MB	Winnipeg–Churchill	
Greening	QC	Montreal–Senneterre	
Grimsby	ON	Maple Leaf	Amtrak
Guelph	ON	Québec City–Windsor Corridor	GO Transit
Guildwood	ON	Québec City–Windsor Corridor	GO Transit
Halcrow	MB	Winnipeg–Churchill	
Halifax	NS	The Ocean	
Harvey	BC	Jasper–Prince Rupert	
Hébertville	QC	Montreal–Jonquière	
Herchmer	MB	Winnipeg–Churchill	
Hervey-Jonction	QC	Montreal–Senneterre Montreal–Jonquière	
Hibbard	QC	Montreal–Senneterre	
Hillsport	ON	The Canadian	
Hinton	AB	The Canadian	
Hirondelle	QC	Montreal–Jonquière	
Hockin	MB	Winnipeg–Churchill	
Hope	BC	The Canadian	
Hornepayne	ON	The Canadian	
Houston	BC	Jasper–Prince Rupert	
Hudson Bay	SK	Winnipeg–Churchill	
Hutton	BC	Jasper–Prince Rupert	
Ilford	MB	Winnipeg–Churchill	
Ingersoll	ON	Québec City–Windsor Corridor	
Jacquet River	NB	The Ocean	
Jasper	AB	The Canadian Jasper–Prince Rupert	
Joliette	QC	Montreal–Senneterre Montreal–Jonquière	
Jonquière	QC	Montreal–Jonquière	
Kamloops North	BC	The Canadian	
Kamsack	SK	Winnipeg–Churchill	
Katz	BC	The Canadian	
Kingston	ON	Québec City–Windsor Corridor	
Kinogama	ON	Sudbury–White River	
Kiskisink	QC	Montreal–Jonquière	
Kitchener	ON	Québec City–Windsor Corridor	GO Transit
Kitwanga	BC	Jasper–Prince Rupert	
Kondiaronk	QC	Montreal–Jonquière	
Kormak	ON	Sudbury–White River	
Kwinitsa	BC	Jasper–Prince Rupert	
La Pocatière	QC	The Ocean	
La Tuque	QC	Montreal–Senneterre	
Lac-aux-Perles	QC	Montreal–Jonquière	
Lac-Bouchette	QC	Montreal–Jonquière	
Lac Darey	QC	Montreal–Senneterre	
Lac des Roches	QC	Montreal–Jonquière	
Lac-Édouard	QC	Montreal–Jonquière	
Lac Malouin	QC	Montreal–Jonquière	
Laforest	ON	The Canadian	
Langlade	QC	Montreal–Senneterre	
L'Assomption station	QC	Montreal–Senneterre Montreal–Jonquière	
Laurier	MB	Winnipeg–Churchill	
Larchwood	ON	Sudbury–White River	
Le Gardeur	QC	Montreal–Senneterre Montreal–Jonquière	
Levack	ON	Sudbury–White River	
Leven	MB	Winnipeg–Churchill	
Lochalsh	ON	Sudbury–White River	
London	ON	Québec City–Windsor Corridor	
Longlac	ON	The Canadian	
Longworth	BC	Jasper–Prince Rupert	
Loos	BC	Jasper–Prince Rupert	
Lyddal	MB	Winnipeg–Churchill	
Malachi	ON	The Canadian	
Manjobagues	QC	Montreal–Senneterre	
Matapédia	QC	The Ocean	
McBride	BC	Jasper–Prince Rupert	
McCarthy	QC	Montreal–Senneterre	
McCreary	MB	Winnipeg–Churchill	
McGregor	BC	Jasper–Prince Rupert	
McKee's Camp	ON	The Canadian	
M'Clintock	MB	Winnipeg–Churchill	
McTavish	QC	Montreal–Senneterre	
Megiscane	QC	Montreal–Senneterre	
Melville	SK	The Canadian	
Metagama	ON	Sudbury–White River	
Mikado	SK	The Canadian	
Minaki	ON	The Canadian	
Misquick	QC	Montreal–Jonquière	
Miramichi	NB	The Ocean	
Missanabie	ON	Sudbury–White River	
Mission Harbour	BC	The Canadian	
Moncton	NB	The Ocean	
Monet	QC	Montreal–Senneterre	
Mont-Joli	QC	The Ocean	
Montmagny	QC	The Ocean	
Montreal Central Station	QC	Québec City–Windsor Corridor The Ocean	Exo; Montreal Metro; Réseau express métropolitain Amtrak
Mud River	ON	The Canadian	
Musk	ON	Sudbury–White River	
Nakina	ON	The Canadian	
Napanee	ON	Québec City–Windsor Corridor	
Nemegos	ON	Sudbury–White River	
New Hazelton	BC	Jasper–Prince Rupert	
Niagara Falls	ON	Maple Leaf	GO Transit Amtrak
Nicholson	ON	Sudbury–White River	
North Bend	BC	The Canadian	
Oakville	ON	Maple Leaf Québec City–Windsor Corridor	GO Transit Amtrak
Oba	ON	The Canadian	
O'Brien	ON	Sudbury–White River	
Ochre River	MB	Winnipeg–Churchill	
O'Day	MB	Winnipeg–Churchill	
Odhill	MB	Winnipeg–Churchill	
Ophir	MB	The Canadian	
Orok	MB	Winnipeg–Churchill	
Oshawa	ON	Québec City–Windsor Corridor	GO Transit
Oskelaneo Lodge	QC	Montreal–Senneterre	
Ottawa	ON	Québec City–Windsor Corridor	O-Train
Ottermere	ON	The Canadian	
Pacific	BC	Jasper–Prince Rupert	
Parent	QC	Montreal–Senneterre	
Parry Sound Station Gallery	ON	The Canadian	
Parry Sound	ON	The Canadian	
Penny	BC	Jasper–Prince Rupert	
Petit Rocher	NB	The Ocean	
Pikwitonei	MB	Winnipeg–Churchill	
Pipun	MB	Winnipeg–Churchill	
Pit Siding	MB	Winnipeg–Churchill	
Plumas	MB	Winnipeg–Churchill	
Pogamasing	ON	Sudbury–White River	
Pont Beaudet	QC	Montreal–Jonquière	
Ponton	MB	Winnipeg–Churchill	
Port Hope	ON	Québec City–Windsor Corridor	
Portage la Prairie	MB	The Canadian Winnipeg–Churchill	
Press	QC	Montreal–Senneterre	
Prince George	BC	Jasper–Prince Rupert	
Prince Rupert	BC	Jasper–Prince Rupert	
Ramsey	ON	Sudbury–White River	
Rapide Blanc	QC	Montreal–Senneterre	
Red Lake Road	ON	The Canadian	
Redditt	ON	The Canadian	
Reserve	SK	Winnipeg–Churchill	
Rice Lake	ON	The Canadian	
Richan	ON	The Canadian	
Rimouski	QC	The Ocean	
Rivers	MB	The Canadian	
Rivière-à-Pierre	QC	Montreal–Jonquière	
Rivière-du-Loup	QC	The Ocean	
Rivière Oskélanéo	QC	Montreal–Senneterre	
Roberts	ON	Sudbury–White River	
Roblin	MB	Winnipeg–Churchill	
Rogersville	NB	The Ocean	
Rosseau	QC	Montreal–Jonquière	
Ruel	ON	The Canadian	
Sackville	NB	The Ocean	
Saint Catharines	ON	Maple Leaf	GO Transit Amtrak
Sainte-Foy	QC	The Ocean Québec City–Windsor Corridor	
Saint Hillaire de Portneuf	QC	Montreal–Jonquière	
Saint-Hyacinthe	QC	The Ocean Québec City–Windsor Corridor	
Saint-Justin	QC	Montreal–Senneterre Montreal–Jonquière	
Saint-Lambert	QC	The Ocean Québec City–Windsor Corridor	Exo; Amtrak
Saint Marys	ON	Québec City–Windsor Corridor	
Saint-Maurice Rivière Boom	QC	Montreal–Senneterre	
Saint-Paulin	QC	Montreal–Senneterre Montreal–Jonquière	
Saint-Tite	QC	Montreal–Senneterre Montreal–Jonquière	
Sanford	QC	Montreal–Jonquière	
Sanmaur	QC	Montreal–Senneterre	
Sarnia	ON	Québec City–Windsor Corridor	
Saskatoon	SK	The Canadian	
Sauvé	QC	Montreal–Senneterre Montreal–Jonquière	Exo; Montreal Metro
Savant Lake	ON	The Canadian	
Sayabec	QC	The Ocean	
Senneterre	QC	Montreal–Senneterre	
Shawinigan	QC	Montreal–Senneterre	
Sheahan	ON	Sudbury–White River	
Signai	QC	Montreal–Senneterre	
Sinclair Mills	BC	Jasper–Prince Rupert	
Sioux Lookout	ON	The Canadian	
Sipiwesk	MB	Winnipeg–Churchill	
Smithers	BC	Jasper–Prince Rupert	
Smiths Falls	ON	Québec City–Windsor Corridor	
Springhill Junction	NS	The Ocean	
Stadacona	QC	Montreal–Jonquière	
Strachan	QC	Montreal–Senneterre	
Stralak	ON	Sudbury–White River	
Stratford	ON	Québec City–Windsor Corridor	
Strathroy	ON	Québec City–Windsor Corridor	
Sturgis	SK	Winnipeg–Churchill	
Sudbury	ON	Sudbury–White River	
Sudbury Junction	ON	The Canadian	
Sultan	ON	Sudbury–White River	
Summit	QC	Montreal–Jonquière	
Swanson	ON	Sudbury–White River	
Telkwa	BC	Jasper–Prince Rupert	
Terrace	BC	Jasper–Prince Rupert	
The Pas	MB	Winnipeg–Churchill	
Thibaudeau	MB	Winnipeg–Churchill	
Thicket Portage	MB	Winnipeg–Churchill	
Thompson	MB	Winnipeg–Churchill	
Tidal	MB	Winnipeg–Churchill	
Timbrell	QC	Montreal–Senneterre	
Togo	SK	Winnipeg–Churchill	
Toronto Union Station	ON	Maple Leaf Québec City–Windsor Corridor The Canadian	GO Transit; Toronto subway Toronto streetcar system Union Pearson Express Amtrak
Trenton Junction	ON	Québec City–Windsor Corridor	
Trois Pistoles	QC	The Ocean	
Truro	NS	The Ocean	
Turnbull	MB	Winnipeg–Churchill	
Unity	SK	The Canadian	
Upper Frazer	BC	Jasper–Prince Rupert	
Usk	BC	Jasper–Prince Rupert	
Valemount	BC	The Canadian	
Van Bruyssers	QC	Montreal–Jonquière	
Vancouver Pacific Central	BC	The Canadian	TransLink Amtrak
Vanderhoof	BC	Jasper–Prince Rupert	
Vandry	QC	Montreal–Senneterre	
Veregin	SK	Winnipeg–Churchill	
Viking	AB	The Canadian	
Wabowden	MB	Winnipeg–Churchill	
Wainwright	AB	The Canadian	
Washago	ON	The Canadian	
Watrous	SK	Winnipeg–Churchill	
Weir River	MB	Winnipeg–Churchill	
Wekusko	MB	Winnipeg–Churchill	
Westree	ON	The Canadian	
Weymont	QC	Montreal–Senneterre	
White River	ON	Sudbury–White River	
Wigwam	QC	Montreal–Senneterre	
Willow River	BC	Jasper–Prince Rupert	
Windigo	QC	Montreal–Senneterre	
Windsor	ON	Québec City–Windsor Corridor	
Winnipeg Union Station	MB	The Canadian	
Winnitoba	MB	The Canadian	
Wivenhoe	MB	Winnipeg–Churchill	
Woman River	ON	Sudbury–White River	
Woodstock	ON	Québec City–Windsor Corridor	
Wyoming	ON	Québec City–Windsor Corridor	
