= Charny station =

Railway station in Quebec, Canada

Charny
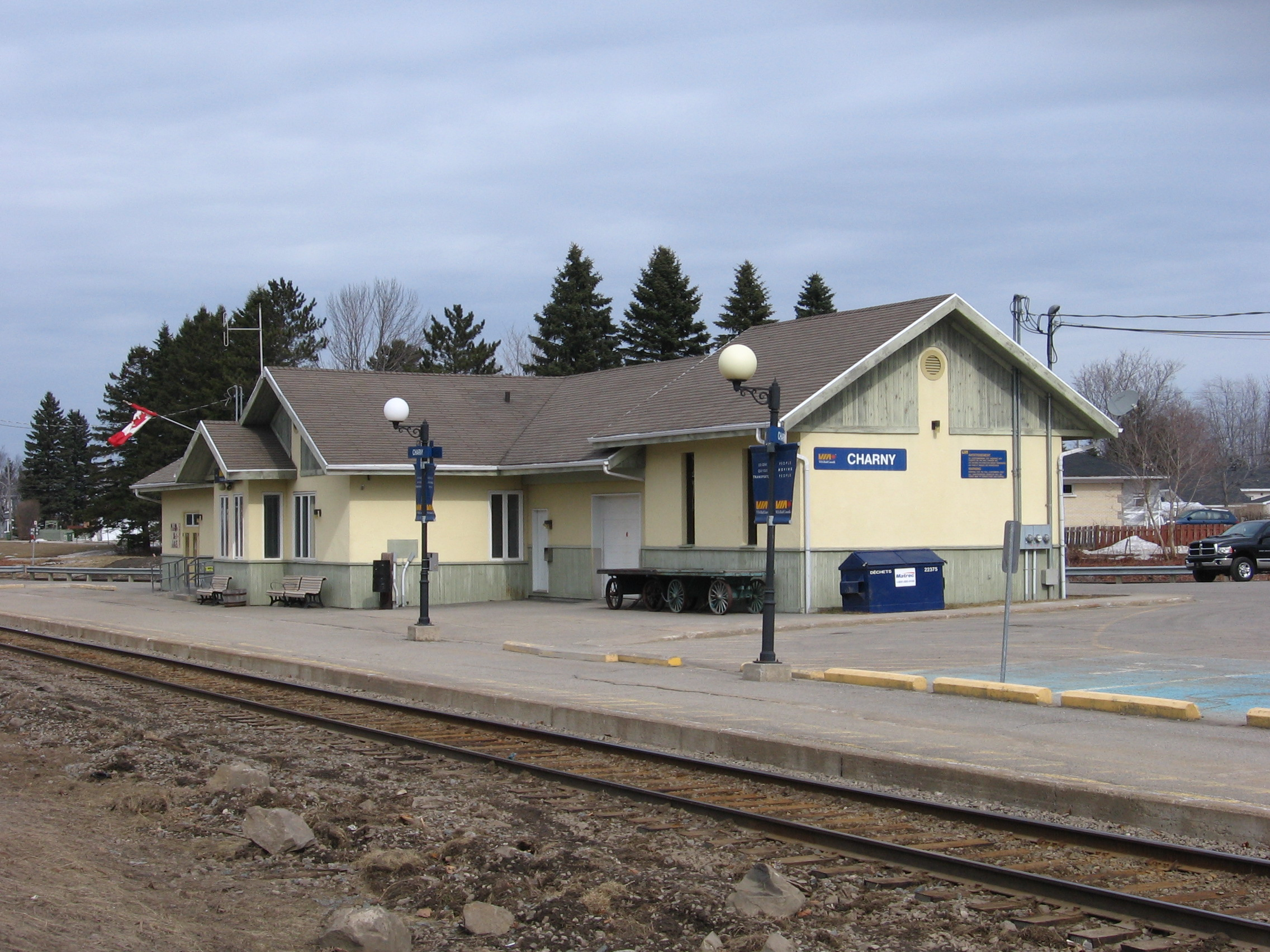

General information
- Location: 2326 Rue de la Gare; Charny, Lévis, QC; Canada
- Coordinates: 46.7135°N 71.2705°W
- Platforms: 1 side platform
- Tracks: 1

Construction
- Parking: Yes
- Accessible: Yes

Other information
- Status: Shelter

Services
Preceding station	Via Rail	Following station
Drummondville toward Ottawa	Ottawa–Québec City	Sainte-Foy toward Quebec City
Former services
Preceding station	Via Rail	Following station
Drummondville toward Montreal	Ocean	Montmagny toward Halifax
Drummondville toward Montreal	Montreal–Gaspé (Suspended 2013-2027)	Montmagny toward Gaspé
Preceding station	Canadian National Railway	Following station
Chaudière toward Montreal	Montreal – Moncton	Bridge toward Moncton
Chaudière toward Richmond	Richmond – Quebec; Local stops	Bridge toward Quebec
Bridge toward Quebec	Quebec – McGivney	Diamond toward McGivney
Location

Charny station is a Via Rail station in Lévis, Quebec, Canada. It is located at 2326 rue de la Gare in the borough of Charny. It is staffed and is wheelchair-accessible. The station is served by one train per day in each direction on the Montreal–Quebec line Corridor service. The station was once a stop on the Montreal–Gaspé train until 2013, and the Ocean until 2014, when that service moved its local stop to Sainte-Foy station.
