= Saint-Lambert station =

Railway station in Quebec, Canada

Saint-Lambert
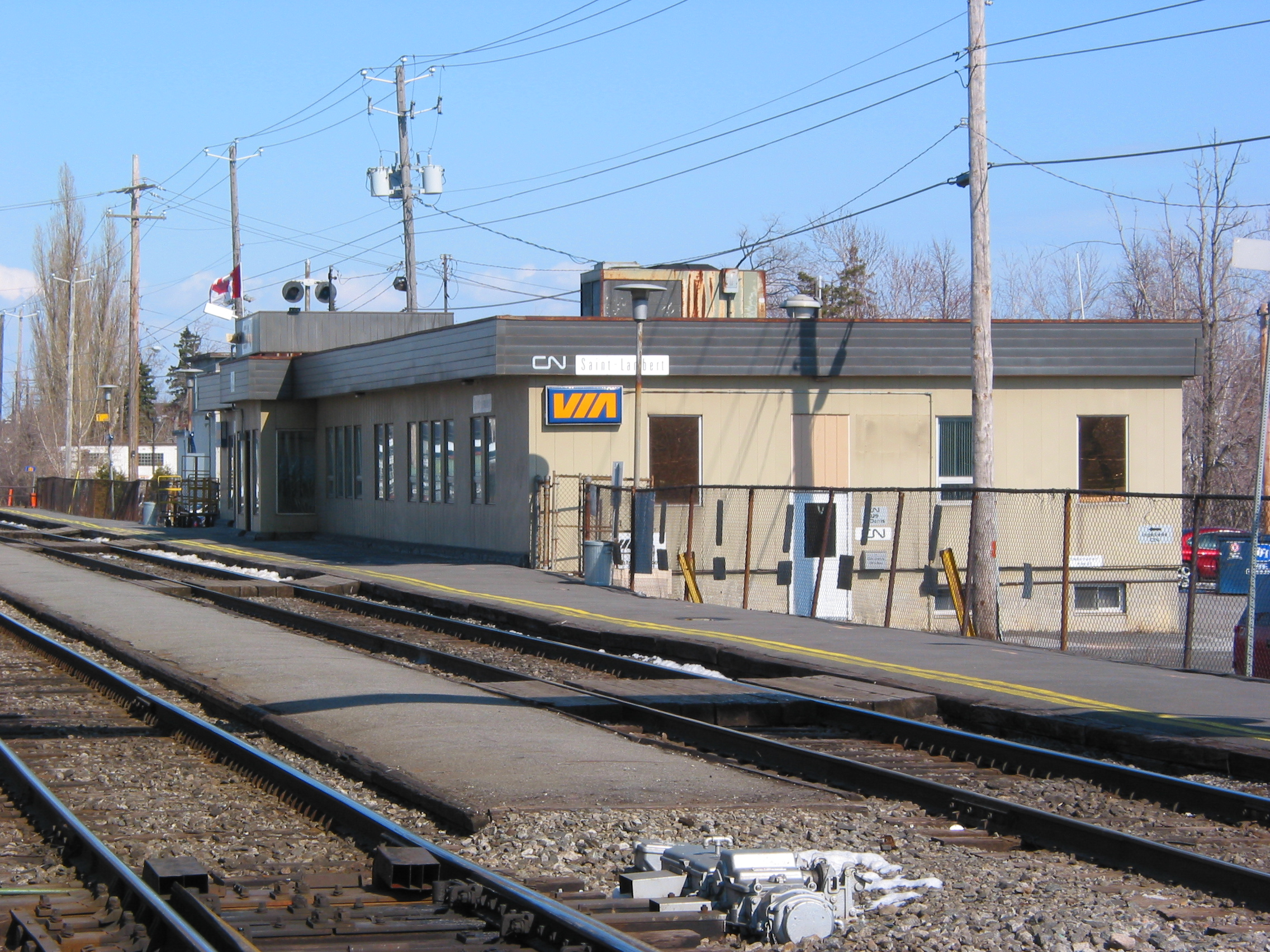
- Via Rail platform at Saint-Lambert station

General information
- Location: 329 Saint-Denis Avenue; Saint-Lambert, Quebec; Canada
- Coordinates: 45°29′57″N 73°30′26″W
- Owner: Via Rail
- Platforms: 2 side platforms
- Tracks: 2
- Connections: Réseau de transport de Longueuil

Construction
- Parking: 368 spaces
- Cycle facilities: 23 spaces
- Accessible: No

Other information
- Status: Unstaffed station
- Station code: Via Rail: SLAM; Amtrak: SLQ
- IATA code: XLM
- Fare zone: ARTM: B

History
- Opened: 29 May 2000

Passengers
- 2019: 452,900 (Exo)
- FY 2025: 872 (Amtrak)

Services
Preceding station	Via Rail	Following station
Montreal Terminus	Ocean	Saint-Hyacinthe toward Halifax
Montreal toward Ottawa	Ottawa–Québec City	Saint-Hyacinthe toward Quebec City
Preceding station	Amtrak	Following station
Montreal Terminus	Adirondack	Rouses Point toward New York
Preceding station	Exo	Following station
Montreal Terminus	Line 13 – Mont-Saint-Hilaire	Longueuil–Saint-Hubert toward Mont-Saint-Hilaire
Former services
Preceding station	Amtrak	Following station
Montreal Terminus	Montrealer	St. Albans toward Washington, D.C.
Preceding station	Via Rail	Following station
Montreal Terminus	Atlantic	Saint-Hyacinthe toward Halifax
Preceding station	Canadian National Railway	Following station
Services in 1948
Montreal Terminus	Central Vermont Route	St. Johns toward East Alburgh
Bridge Street toward Montreal	Montreal – Victoriaville	Longueuil toward Victoriaville
Bridge Street toward Montreal	Montreal – Fort Covington	Brosseau toward Fort Covington
Bridge Street toward Montreal	Montreal – Portland	St. Hubert toward Portland
Bridge Street toward Montreal	St. Johns services	Brosseau toward Waterloo or Rouses Point
Location

Saint-Lambert station (French pronunciation: [sɛ̃ lɑ̃bɛʁ]) in Saint-Lambert, Quebec, Canada, serves Exo commuter rail, Via Rail and Amtrak intercity rail, and RTL buses. It is located at 329 Avenue Saint-Denis at the corner of Avenue Victoria.

The station is served by two Via Rail lines: the Ocean and Ottawa-Quebec City Corridor service, and one Amtrak train, the Adirondack, which links to New York City. It is also used by Exo for commuter rail service on the Mont-Saint-Hilaire line. There are four local buses routes stopping at this station. The station was staffed by VIA Rail ticket agents until 25 October 2012. Since then, it has been unstaffed, but the station building is open before and after train arrival and departure times, to serve as a shelter for waiting passengers. It is not wheelchair-accessible. It is in ARTM fare zone B, and has 320 parking spaces. Prior to the reform of the ARTM's fare system in July 2022, it was in zone 3.

The station serves as the Via Rail station for nearby Longueuil, which does not have an intercity rail station of its own.

In 2012, plans were announced for the Adirondack to bypass the station entirely in the near future, following the opening of a new U.S. Customs preclearance facility at Montreal's Central Station. Under this scenario, Saint-Lambert would be dropped from the Adirondack route to expedite scheduling. As of March 2017, the United States Congress had passed the necessary legislation and the Parliament of Canada was considering it.

== Connecting bus routes ==
Réseau de transport de Longueuil
No.	Route	Connects to	Service times / notes
1 ♿︎	Desaulniers / Victoria / Windsor	Longueuil–Université-de-Sherbrooke	Daily
6 ♿︎	Victoria	Longueuil–Université-de-Sherbrooke; Panama	Daily
55	Victoria / Wellington	Bonaventure; Gare Centrale; Terminus Centre-Ville	Weekdays, peak only
