= Saint-Hyacinthe station =

Railway station in Quebec, Canada

Saint-Hyacinthe
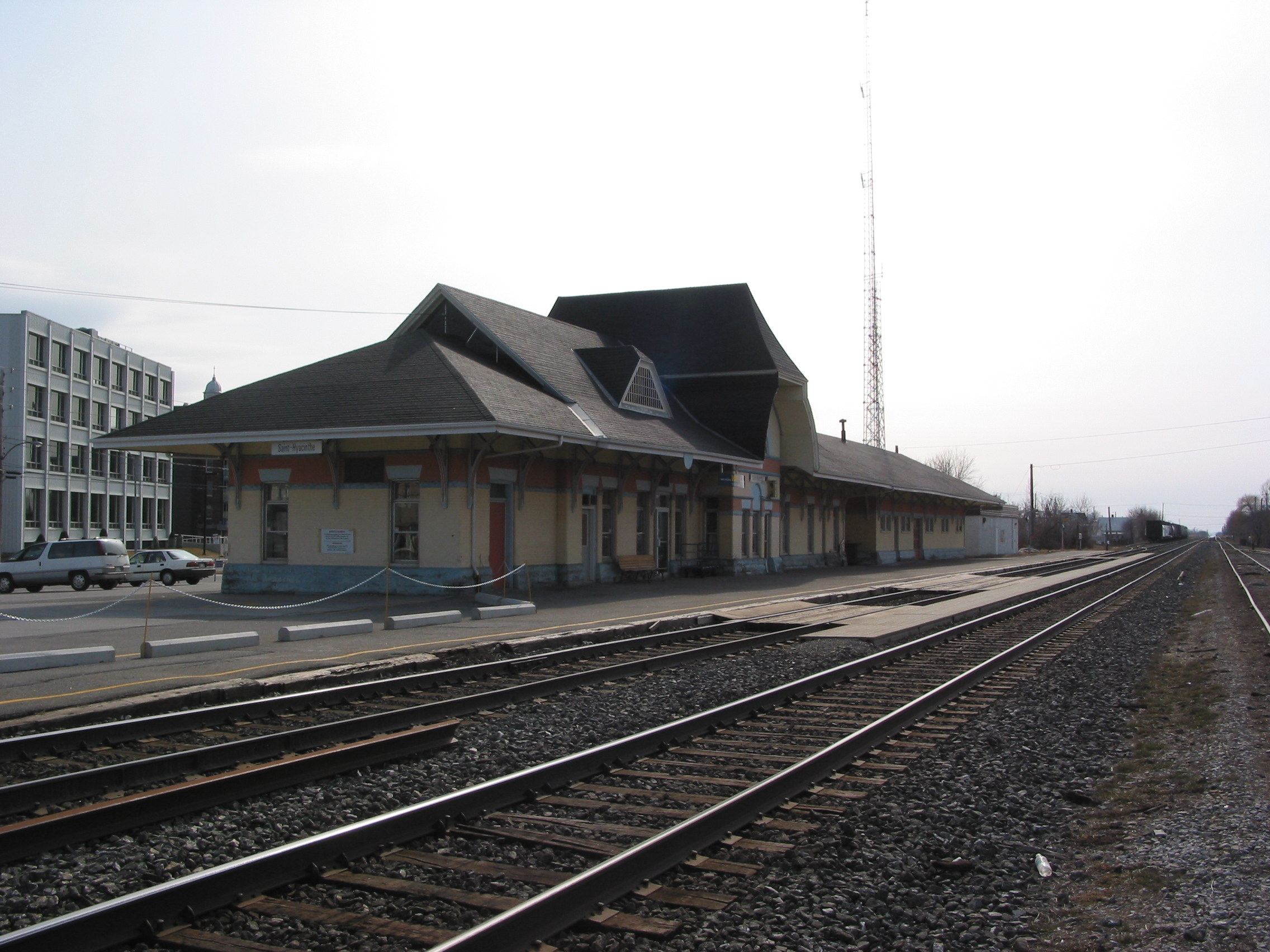

General information
- Location: 1450 Sicotte Street; Saint-Hyacinthe, QC; Canada
- Coordinates: 45.6275°N 72.949°W
- Platforms: 1 side platform
- Tracks: 2

Construction
- Structure type: Unstaffed station
- Accessible: Yes

Other information
- Station code: IATA: XIM

History
- Opened: 1870
- Rebuilt: 1872, 1900

Services
Preceding station	Via Rail	Following station
Saint-Lambert toward Montreal	Ocean	Drummondville toward Halifax
Saint-Lambert toward Ottawa	Ottawa–Québec City	Drummondville toward Quebec City
Former services
Preceding station	Via Rail	Following station
Saint-Lambert toward Montreal	Montreal–Gaspé (Suspended 2013-2027)	Drummondville toward Gaspé
Saint-Lambert toward Montreal	Atlantic 1978–1981; 1985–1994	Acton Vale closed 1994 toward Halifax
Saint-Lambert toward Montreal	Montreal–Sherbrooke 1985–1990 (Note: The stations served by this local train merged with the Atlantic in 1990)	Acton Vale closed 1994 toward Sherbrooke
St. Hilaire East closed 1982 toward Montreal	Montreal–Sherbrooke 1978–1981	St. Liboire closed 1981 toward Sherbrooke
Preceding station	Canadian National Railway	Following station
Ste. Madeleine toward Montreal	Montreal – Moncton	Ste. Rosalie Junction toward Moncton
Ste. Madeleine toward Montreal	Montreal – Richmond; Local stops	Ste. Rosalie Junction toward Richmond
Location

The Saint-Hyacinthe station is a Via Rail station in Saint-Hyacinthe, Quebec, Canada. The station is staffed and is wheelchair-accessible. Several corridor Montreal-Quebec City trains and the long-distance Ocean stop here; the Montreal–Gaspé train was suspended in 2013. The station's business hours are from 7:00 am to 11:15 am (for morning travellers) and from 6:00 pm to 8:30 pm (for evening travelers); seven days a week. A bicycle box and a baggage room are special amenities found in this station.

The rail station is completely accessible by public transportation.

The current station building dates to 1900, but Grand Trunk Railway built the first Saint-Hyacinthe station in 1870 and again in 1872.
