= McGivney =

McGivney may refer to:

- McGivney, New Brunswick, a settlement in New Brunswick
- 21576 McGivney, a main-belt asteroid

== People with the surname ==
- Michael J. McGivney (1852–1890), Roman Catholic priest and founder of the Knights of Columbus
