= Rivière-du-Loup (disambiguation) =

Rivière-du-Loup may refer to:

Places in Quebec, Canada:

- Rivière-du-Loup, a city
- Rivière du Loup (Bas-Saint-Laurent), a river
- Rivière du Loup (Chaudière River tributary), a river
- Rivière-du-Loup Regional County Municipality
- Rivière-du-Loup (electoral district), a former provincial electoral district
- Rivière-du-Loup–Témiscouata, a provincial electoral district
- Kamouraska–Rivière-du-Loup, a former provincial electoral district
- Rivière-du-Loup station, a railway station

Other:

- HMCS Riviere du Loup (K357), a Canadian warship
