= Drummondville station =

Railway station in Quebec, Canada

Drummondville
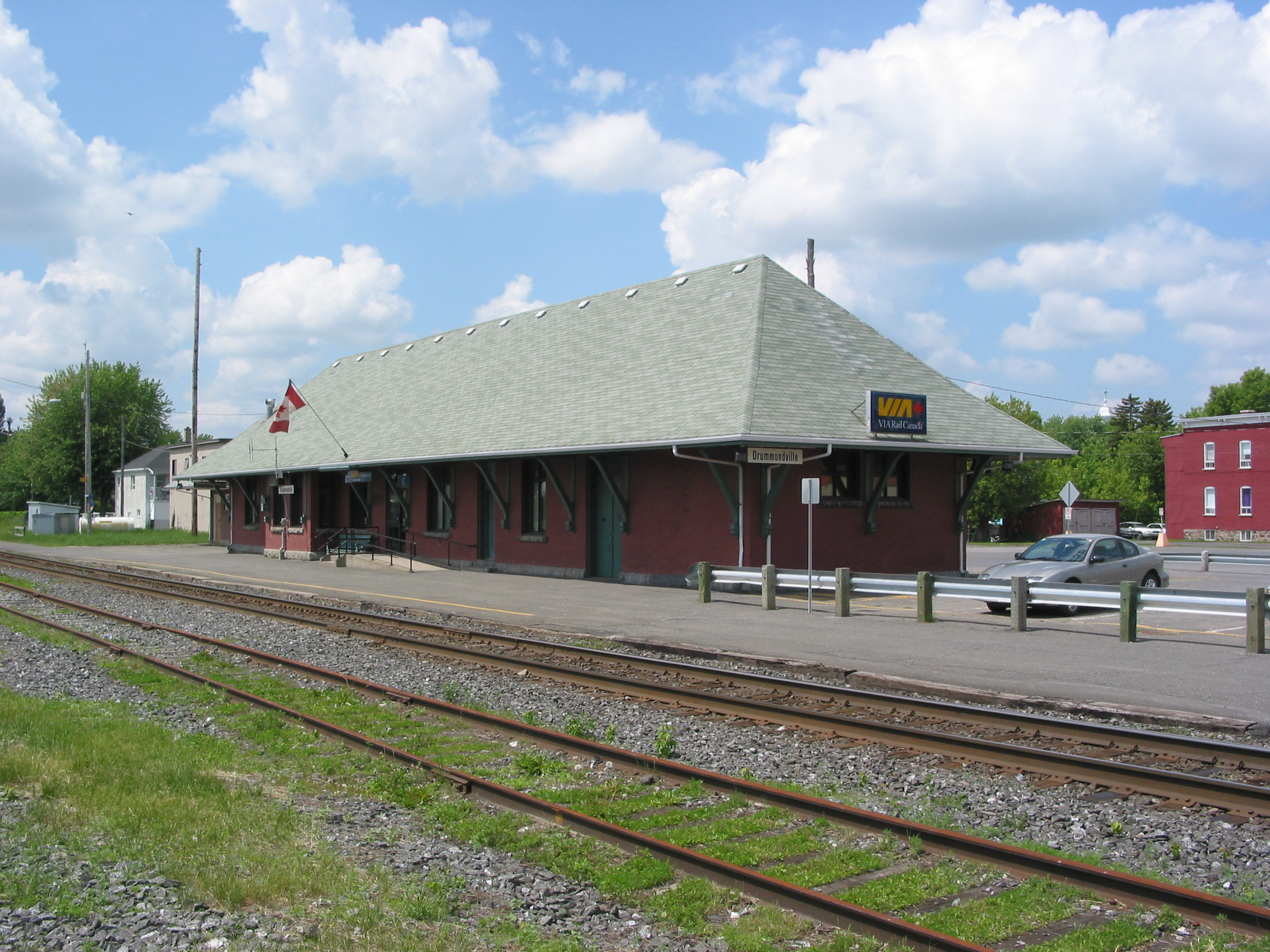

General information
- Location: 263 rue Lindsay; Drummondville, QC, Canada
- Coordinates: 45.8820°N 72.4884°W
- Platforms: 1 side platforms
- Tracks: 2

Construction
- Structure type: Unstaffed station
- Parking: Yes
- Accessible: Yes

Services
Preceding station	Via Rail	Following station
Saint-Hyacinthe toward Montreal	Ocean	Sainte-Foy toward Halifax
Saint-Hyacinthe toward Ottawa	Ottawa–Québec City	Charny toward Quebec City
Former services
Preceding station	Via Rail	Following station
Saint-Hyacinthe toward Montreal	Montreal–Gaspé (Suspended 2013-2027)	Charny toward Gaspé
Preceding station	Canadian National Railway	Following station
St. Germain toward Montreal	Montreal – Moncton	St. Cyrille toward Moncton
Location

Drummondville station is a Via Rail station in Drummondville, Quebec, Canada. It is located at 263 Lindsay Street, and was staffed until October 2013, when a machine replaced the tickets window; it is wheelchair-accessible. Several corridor Montreal-Quebec City trains and the long-distance Ocean stop here; the Montreal – Gaspé train was suspended in 2013.
