= Miramichi station =

Railway station in New Brunswick, Canada

Miramichi
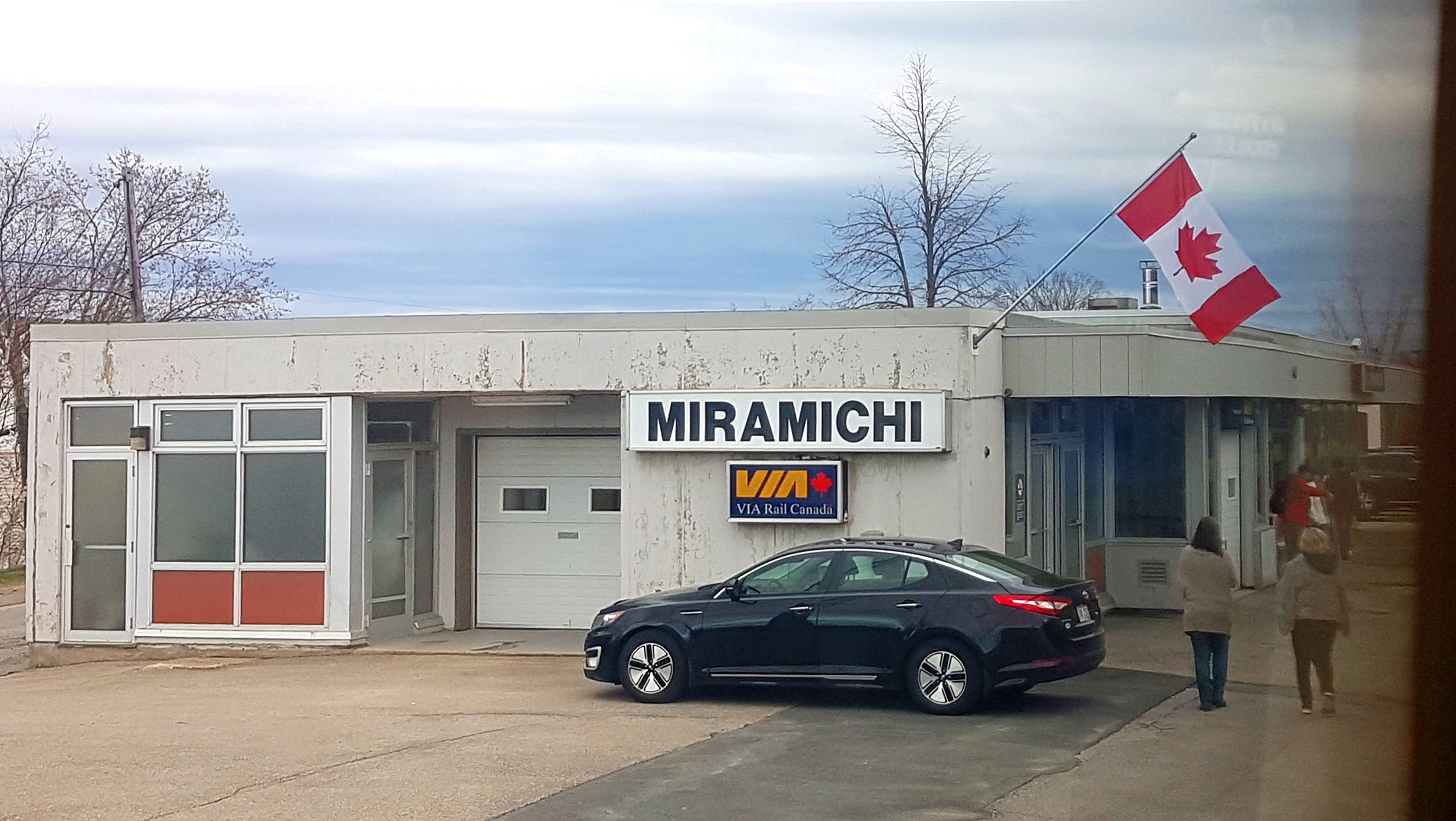
- Miramichi station in 2019

General information
- Location: 251 Station Street; Miramichi, New Brunswick; Canada
- Coordinates: 47.0047°N 65.5735°W
- Owner: Via Rail

Construction
- Structure type: At-grade
- Parking: yes
- Accessible: yes

Other information
- Status: Staffed station

History
- Former names: Newcastle

Services
Preceding station	Via Rail	Following station
Bathurst toward Montreal	Ocean	Rogersville toward Halifax
Former services
Preceding station	Canadian National Railway	Following station
Patterson toward Montreal	Montreal – Moncton	Derby Junction toward Moncton
Terminus	Fredericton – Newcastle	Derby Junction toward Fredericton
Terminus	Newcastle – Loggieville	Derby Junction toward Loggieville
Location

Miramichi station is a railway station in Newcastle, New Brunswick which is nowadays part of Miramichi, New Brunswick. It is served by Via Rail's Montreal-Halifax train, the Ocean, and is staffed and wheelchair-accessible. The station building is a single storey white block building in an international style, and is located at 251 Station Street (near the terminus of George Street).
