= Acton Vale station =

Railway station in Quebec, Canada

Acton Vale
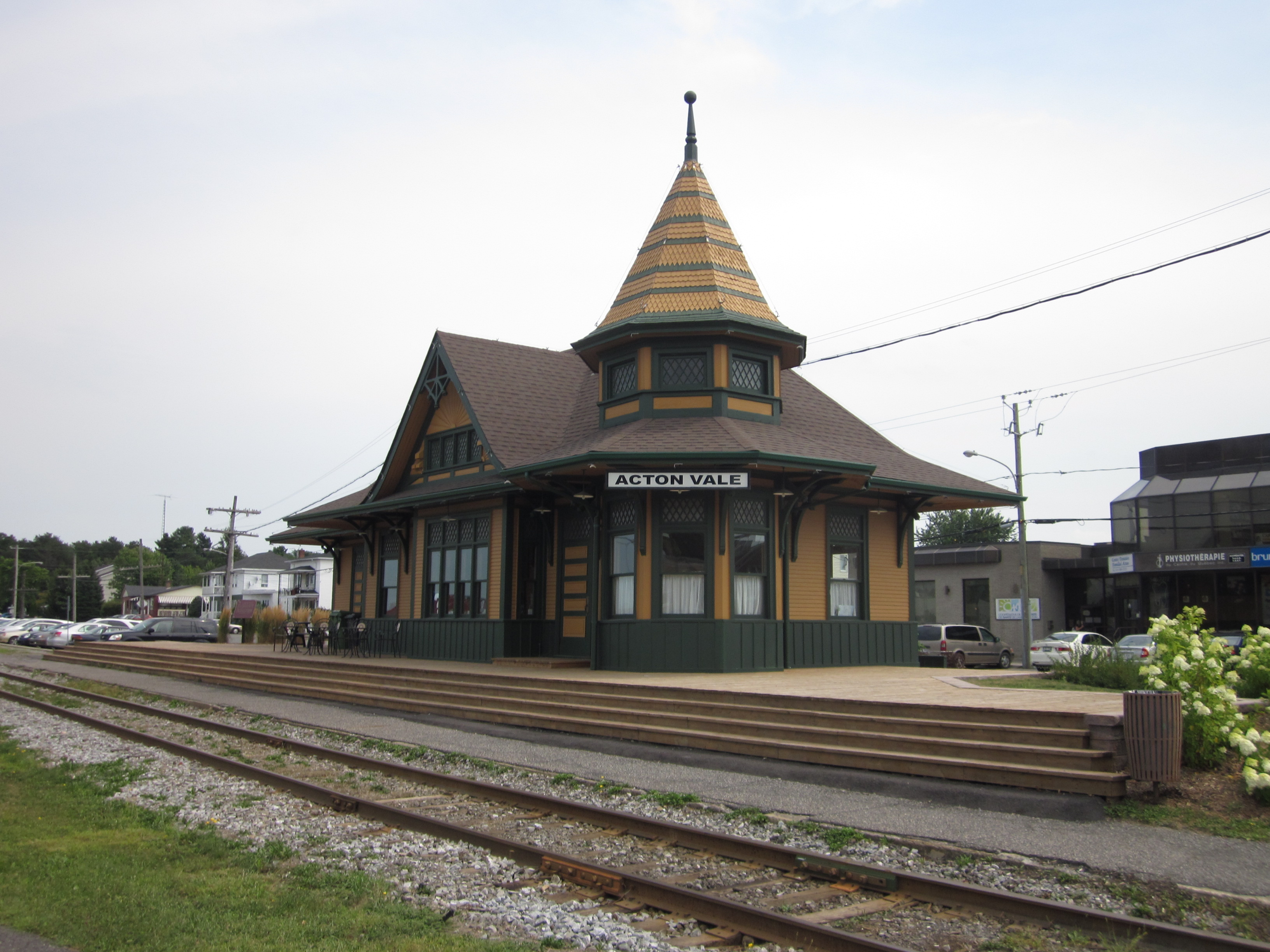

General information
- Location: 960 Boulay Street; Acton Vale, Quebec; Canada
- Coordinates: 45°38′54″N 72°33′50″W

Construction
- Structure type: Dormer, turret and bellcast roof

History
- Opened: 1900; 1985
- Closed: 1981; 1994

Former services
Preceding station	Via Rail	Following station
Saint-Hyacinthe toward Montreal	Atlantic	Richmond toward Halifax
Preceding station	Canadian National Railway	Following station
Upton toward Montreal	Montreal – Portland	Danby toward Portland

National Historic Site of Canada
- Official name: Acton Vale Railway Station
- Designated: 1976
- Reference no.: 10708
Route map
Location

Acton Vale station is a former railway station in Acton Vale, Quebec, Canada. The station was built in 1900 by the Grand Trunk Railway and is located at 960 Boulay Street.

It was recognized as a National Historic Site of Canada on June 11, 1976. Today it operates as a town tourism office and exhibition centre.
