= La Pocatière station =

Railway station in Quebec, Canada

Coordinates: 47.364307°N 70.021491°W

La Pocatière
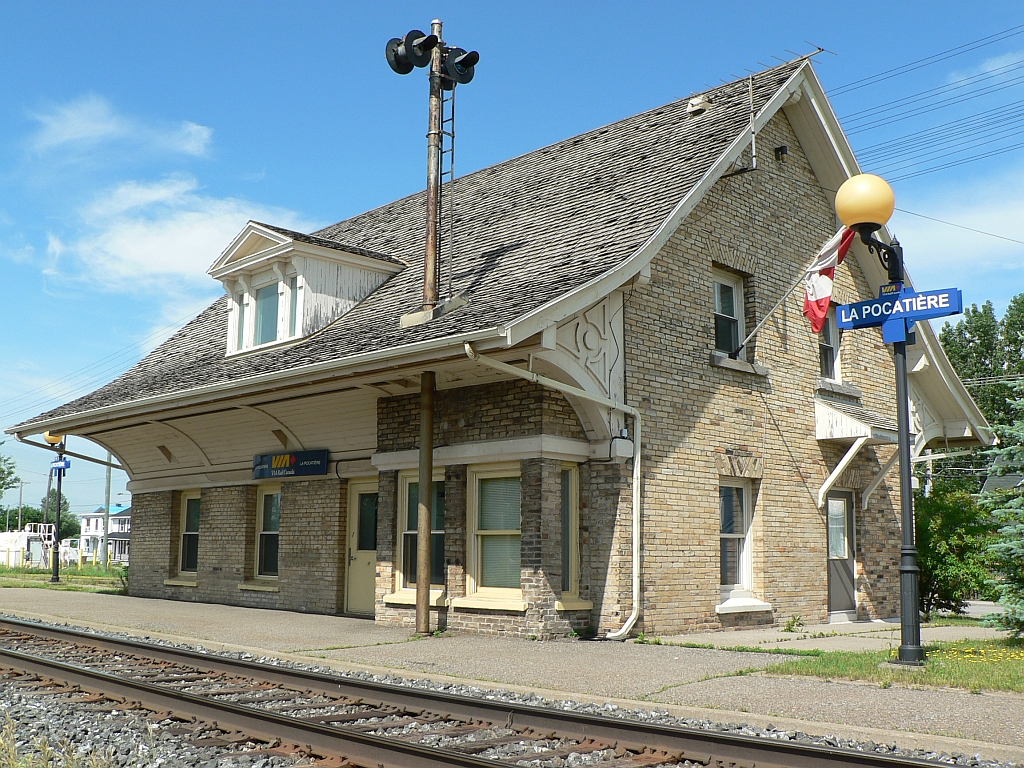

General information
- Location: 95 Avenue de la Gare; La Pocatière, QC; Canada
- Platforms: 1 side platform
- Tracks: 1

Construction
- Structure type: Shelter
- Parking: Yes
- Accessible: Yes

History
- Former names: Sainte Anne

Services
Preceding station	Via Rail	Following station
Montmagny toward Montreal	Ocean	Rivière-du-Loup toward Halifax
Former services
Preceding station	Via Rail	Following station
Montmagny toward Montreal	Montreal–Gaspé (Suspended 2013-2027)	Rivière-du-Loup toward Gaspé
Preceding station	Canadian National Railway	Following station
Ste. Louise toward Montreal	Montreal – Moncton	St. Pacôme toward Moncton

Heritage Railway Station (Canada)
- Official name: Sainte-Anne-de-la-Pocatière
- Designated: 1995
- Reference no.: 4581
Location

La Pocatière station is a Via Rail station in La Pocatière, Quebec, Canada. It is located on Avenue de la Gare. The station is staffed and offers limited wheelchair accessibility. La Pocatière is served by Via Rail's Ocean; the Montreal – Gaspé train was suspended in 2013. Both trains share the same rail line between Montreal and Matapédia.

The station is recognized as a Heritage Railway Station by the Federal government. It has a citation from the municipality of Sainte-Anne-de-la-Pocatière, which is listed in the Quebec Cultural Heritage Directory.
