= Trois Pistoles station =

Railway station in Quebec, Canada

Trois-Pistoles
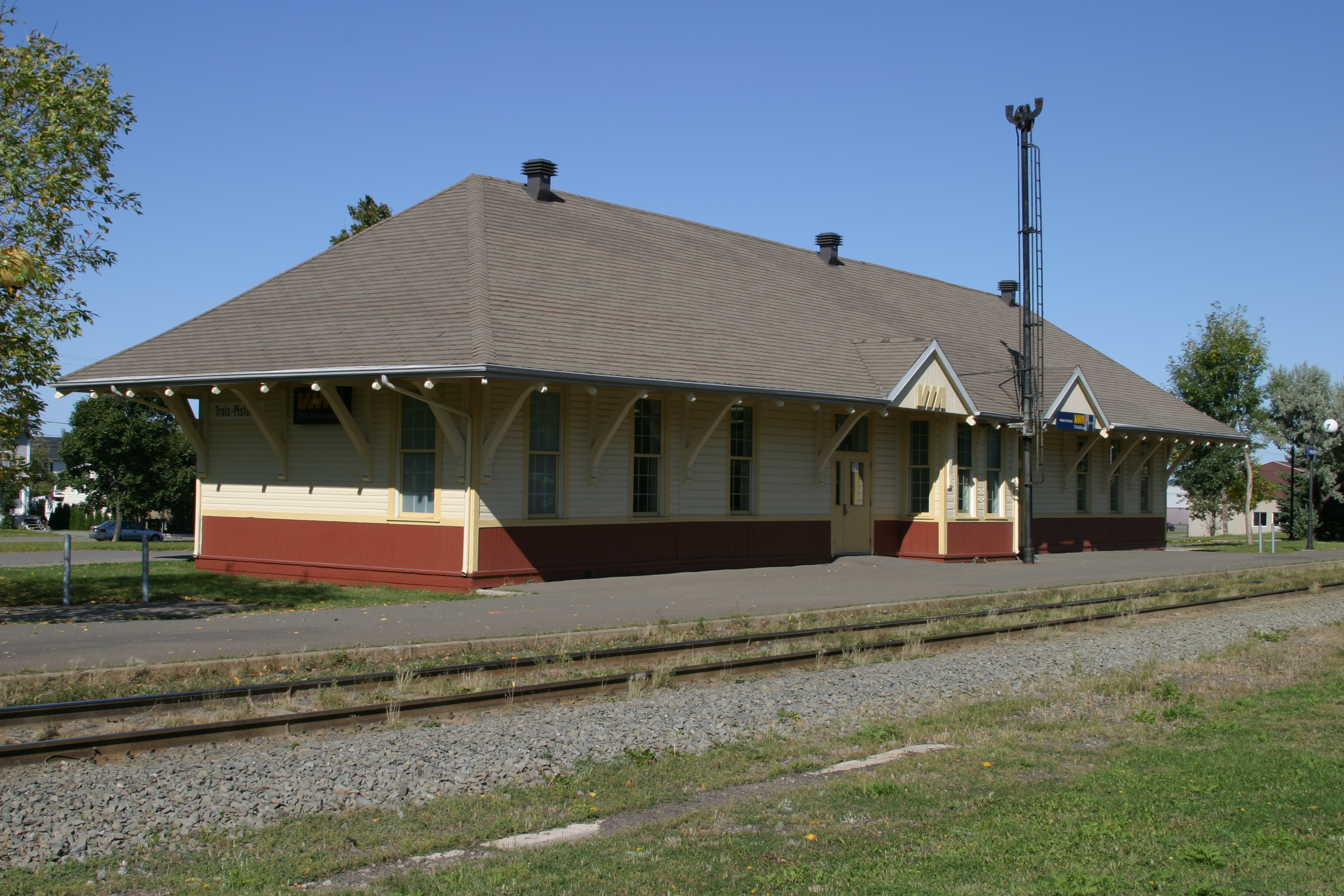

General information
- Location: 231 De la Gare; Trois Pistoles, QC; Canada
- Coordinates: 48.1270°N 69.1734°W
- Platforms: 1 side platform
- Tracks: 1

Construction
- Structure type: Sign post
- Parking: Yes
- Accessible: Yes

Services
Preceding station	Via Rail	Following station
Rivière-du-Loup toward Montreal	Ocean	Rimouski toward Halifax
Former services
Preceding station	Via Rail	Following station
Rivière-du-Loup toward Montreal	Montreal–Gaspé (Suspended 2013-2027)	Rimouski toward Gaspé
Preceding station	Canadian National Railway	Following station
Tobin toward Montreal	Montreal – Moncton	St. Simon toward Moncton
Location

Trois Pistoles station is a Via Rail station in Trois-Pistoles, Quebec, Canada. It is located on Rue de la Gare and is staffed and is wheelchair-accessible. Trois Pistoles is served by Via Rail's Ocean; the Montreal – Gaspé train was suspended in 2013. Both trains shared the same rail line between Montreal and Matapédia.
