= Bathurst station (New Brunswick) =

Railway station in New Brunswick, Canada

Bathurst
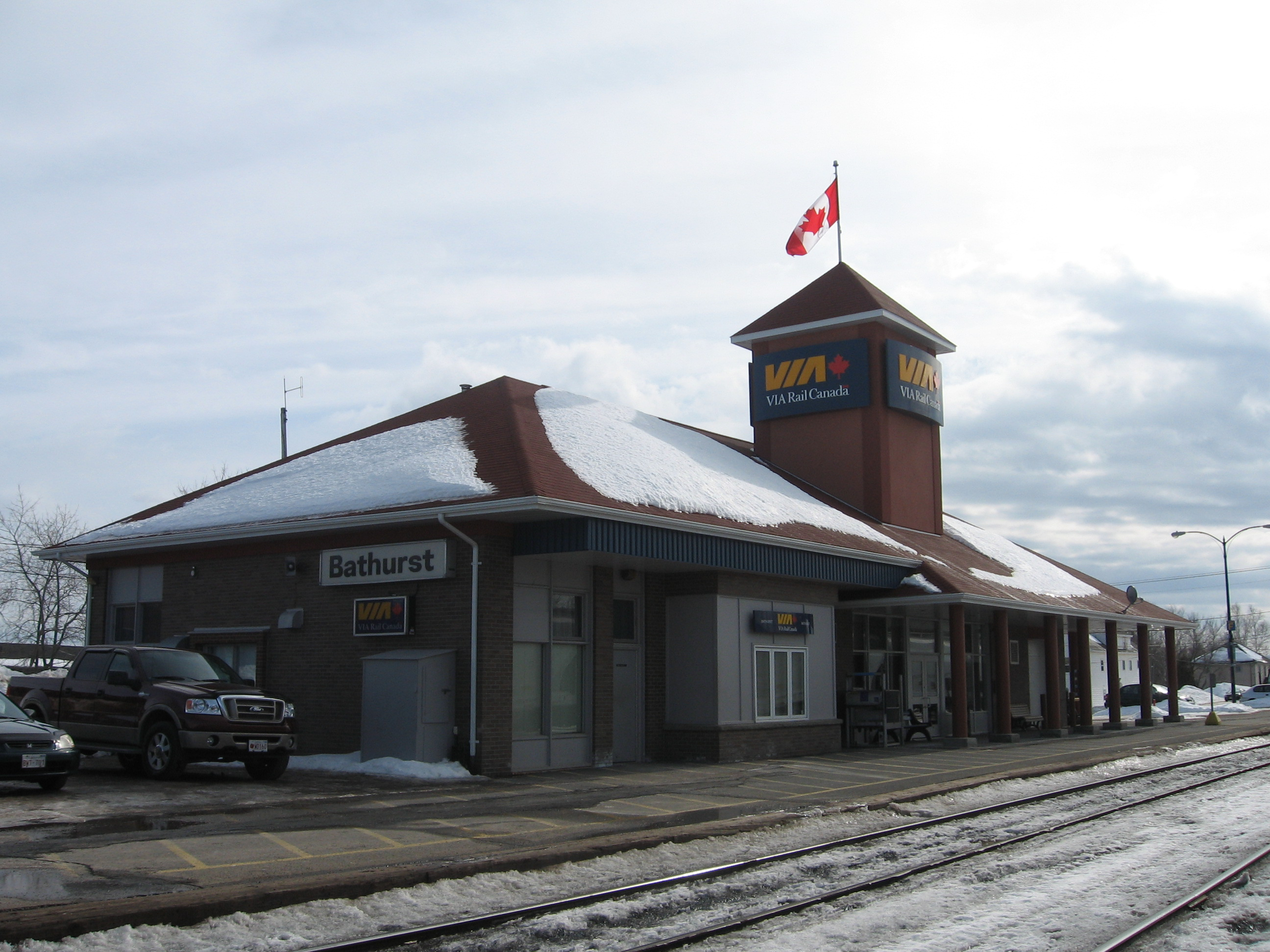

General information
- Location: 690 Thornton Avenue; Bathurst, New Brunswick; Canada
- Coordinates: 47°37′08″N 65°40′16″W
- Platforms: 1 side platform
- Tracks: 5

Construction
- Parking: Yes
- Cycle facilities: Yes
- Accessible: Yes

Other information
- Status: Staffed station

History
- Former names: New Brunswick East Coast Railway

Services
Preceding station	Via Rail	Following station
Petit Rocher toward Montreal	Ocean	Miramichi toward Halifax
Former services
Preceding station	Canadian National Railway	Following station
Beresford toward Montreal	Montreal – Moncton	Nepisiguit Junction toward Moncton
Terminus	Bathurst – Tracadie	Gloucester Junction toward Tracadie
Location

Bathurst station is a staffed Via Rail station in Bathurst, New Brunswick, Canada. Bathurst is served by Via Rail's Montreal–Halifax train, the Ocean.
