= Rimouski station =

Railway station in Quebec, Canada

Rimouski
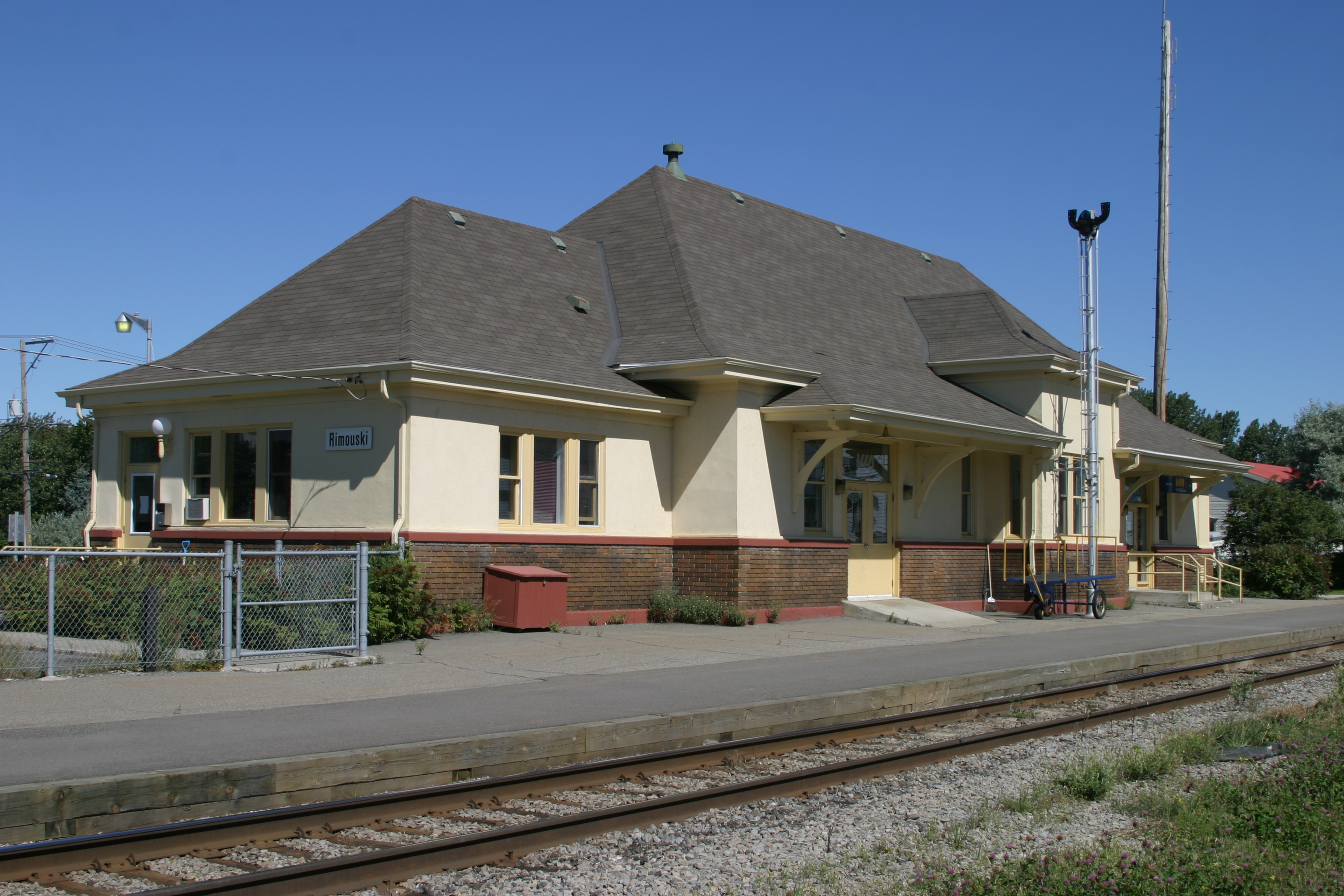

General information
- Location: 57 rue de l'Évêché Est; Rimouski, QC, Canada
- Coordinates: 48°27′00″N 68°31′17″W
- Platforms: 1 side platform
- Tracks: 1

Construction
- Structure type: Shelter
- Parking: Yes
- Accessible: Yes

Services
Preceding station	Via Rail	Following station
Trois Pistoles toward Montreal	Ocean	Mont-Joli toward Halifax
Former services
Preceding station	Via Rail	Following station
Trois Pistoles toward Montreal	Montreal–Gaspé (Suspended 2013-2027)	Mont-Joli toward Gaspé
Preceding station	Canadian National Railway	Following station
Sacré-Coeur toward Montreal	Montreal – Moncton	St. Anaclet toward Moncton
Location

Rimouski station is a Via Rail station in Rimouski, Quebec, Canada. It is located on Rue de l'Évèché, is staffed and wheelchair-accessible. Rimouski is served by Via Rail's Ocean and was served by Montreal–Gaspé train until the latter was suspended in 2013. Both trains shared the same rail line between Montreal and Matapédia.
