= Rogersville station =

Railway station in New Brunswick, Canada

Rogersville
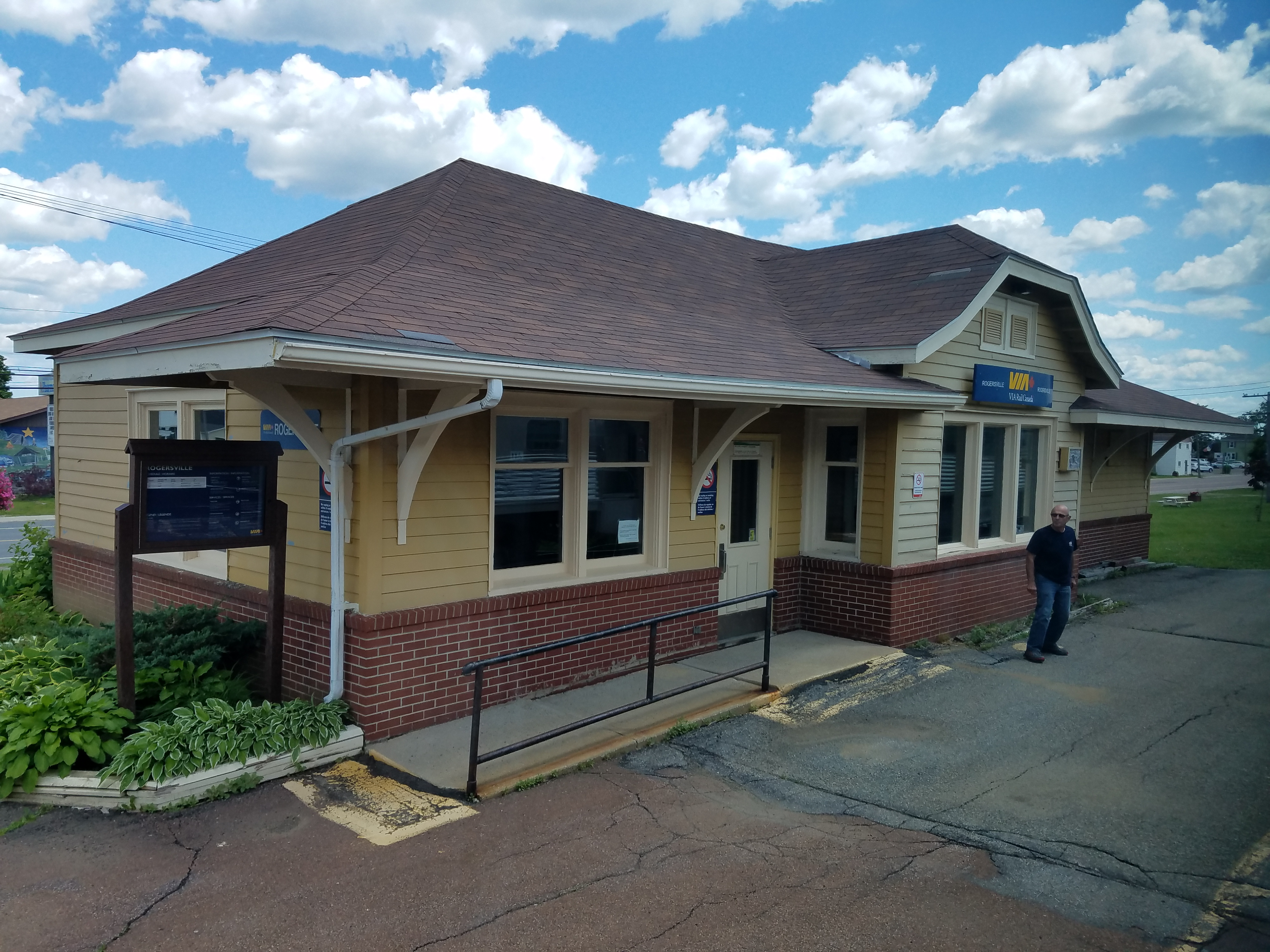

General information
- Location: 11082 Principale Street; Nouvelle-Arcadie, NB; Canada
- Coordinates: 46°43′46″N 65°25′31″W
- Owner: Via Rail

Construction
- Structure type: Unstaffed station; at-grade
- Parking: Yes
- Accessible: yes

Services
Preceding station	Via Rail	Following station
Miramichi toward Montreal	Ocean	Moncton toward Halifax
Former services
Preceding station	Canadian National Railway	Following station
Tunnel toward Montreal	Montreal – Moncton	Acadiaville toward Moncton
Location

Rogersville station is a railway station in Nouvelle-Arcadie, New Brunswick, Canada. Nouvelle-Arcadie is served by Via Rail's Montreal-Halifax train, the Ocean; it is staffed and wheelchair accessible. The station is a 1 1/2-storey wooden-framed yellow clapboard building with a hip roof, located at 11082 Rue Principale (Route 126).
