= Montmagny station =

Railway station in Quebec, Canada

Montmagny
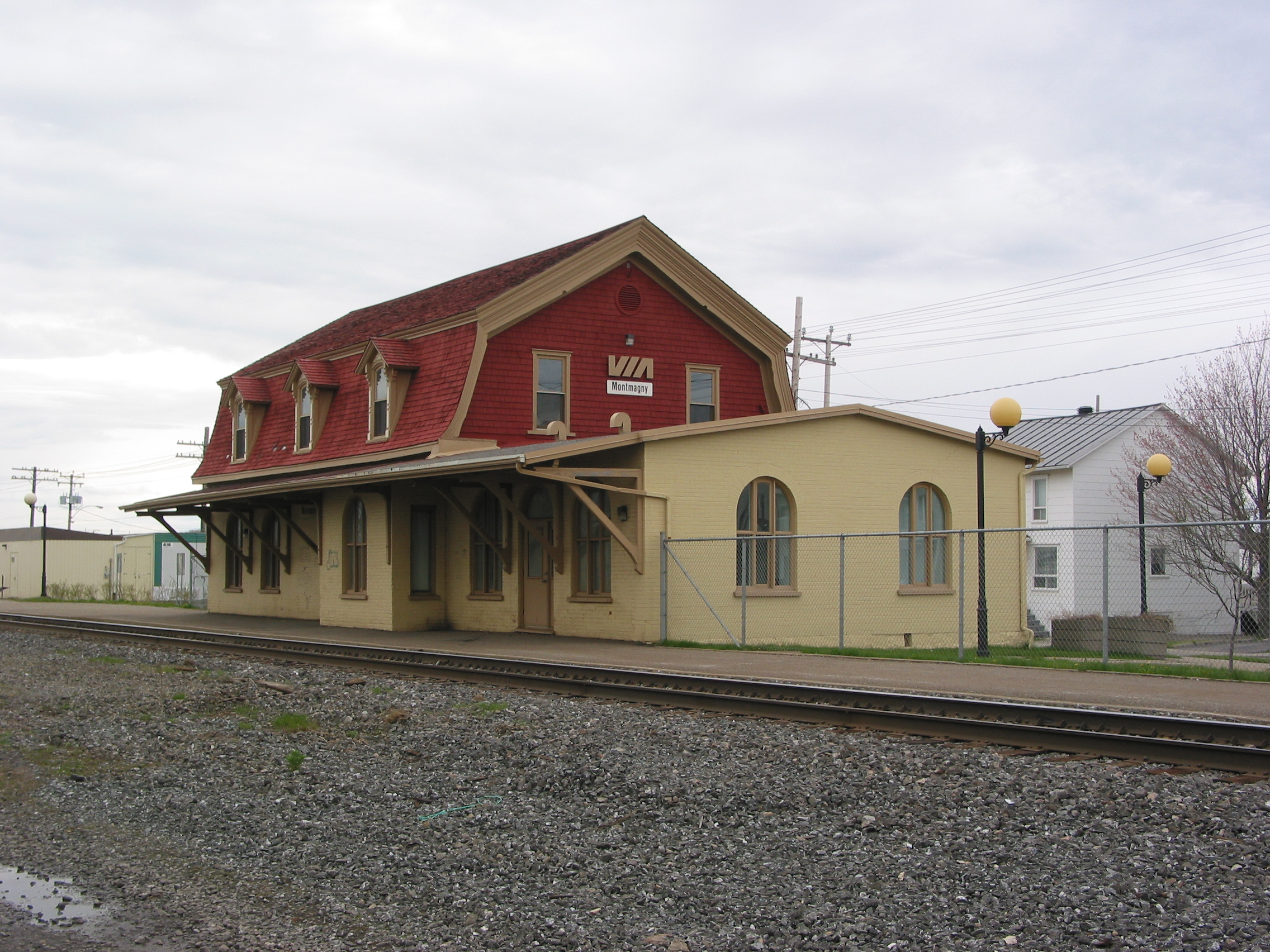

General information
- Location: 4 Rue de la Station; Montmagny, QC; Canada
- Coordinates: 46°58′24″N 70°33′35″W
- Owner: Via Rail
- Line: CN Rail
- Platforms: side platform
- Tracks: 1

Construction
- Structure type: Sign post

History
- Opened: 1881
- Original company: Intercolonial Railway

Services
Preceding station	Via Rail	Following station
Sainte-Foy toward Montreal	Ocean	La Pocatière toward Halifax
Former services
Preceding station	Via Rail	Following station
Sainte-Foy toward Montreal	Montreal–Gaspé (Suspended 2013-2027)	La Pocatière toward Gaspé
Preceding station	Canadian National Railway	Following station
St. Pierre toward Montreal	Montreal – Moncton	Cap St. Ignace toward Moncton

Heritage Railway Station (Canada)
- Designated: 1994
- Reference no.: 7100
Location

Montmagny station is a Via Rail station in Montmagny, Quebec, Canada. It is a request stop on the Ocean line. It also served the Montreal–Gaspé train until Via Rail suspended service in August 2013 due to poor track conditions.

== History ==
The railway station was built by the Intercolonial Railway in 1881 and enlarged in 1904. The station building features a first storey of brick with arched windows, a second storey of wooden framed construction, and a gambrel roof.

== Le Voyageur museum ==
Le Voyageur - La Gare de Montmagny museum, located in the railway station, tells the story of the people of Montmagny. One wall shows the musicians of Montmagny and musical instruments. There is also an exhibition on stove making, once a big industry in Montmagny.
