= Rivière-du-Loup station =

Railway station in Quebec, Canada

Rivière-du-Loup
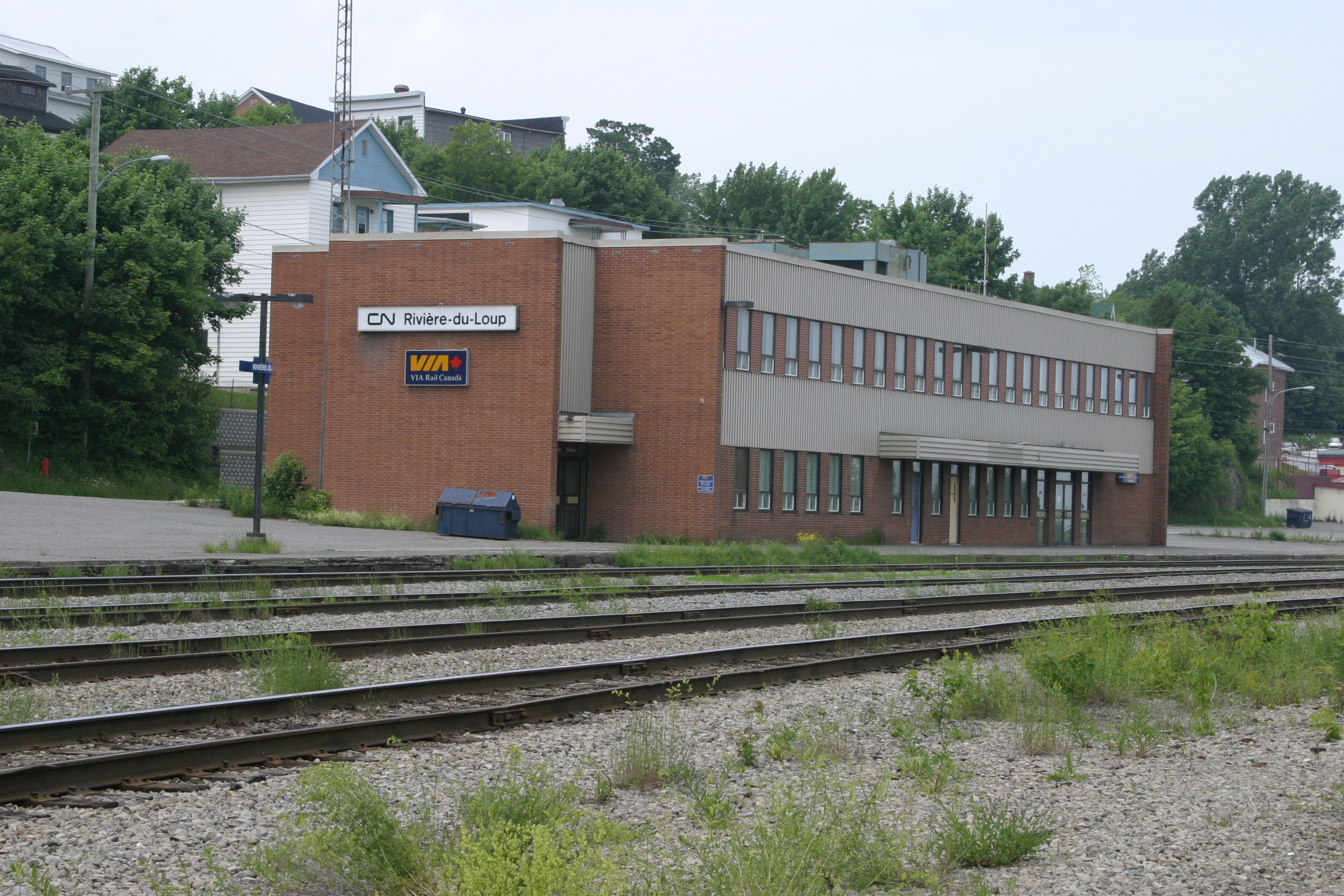

General information
- Location: 615 rue Lafontaine; Rivière-du-Loup, QC, Canada
- Coordinates: 47.8249°N 69.5276°W
- Platforms: 1 side platform
- Tracks: 1

Construction
- Structure type: Sign post
- Parking: Yes
- Accessible: Yes

Services
Preceding station	Via Rail	Following station
La Pocatière toward Montreal	Ocean	Trois Pistoles toward Halifax
Former services
Preceding station	Via Rail	Following station
La Pocatière toward Montreal	Montreal–Gaspé (Suspended 2013-2027)	Trois Pistoles toward Gaspé
Preceding station	Canadian National Railway	Following station
Chemin du Lac toward Montreal	Montreal – Moncton	Cacouna toward Moncton
Location

Rivière-du-Loup station is a railway station in Rivière-du-Loup, Quebec, Canada. Rivière-du-Loup is served by Via Rail's Ocean train. Previously, it was also served by the Montreal–Gaspé train. Both trains shared the same rail line between Montreal and Matapédia. Located on Rue Lafontaine, it is staffed and offers limited wheelchair accessibility.
