= Sainte-Foy station =

Railway station in Quebec, Canada

Sainte-Foy
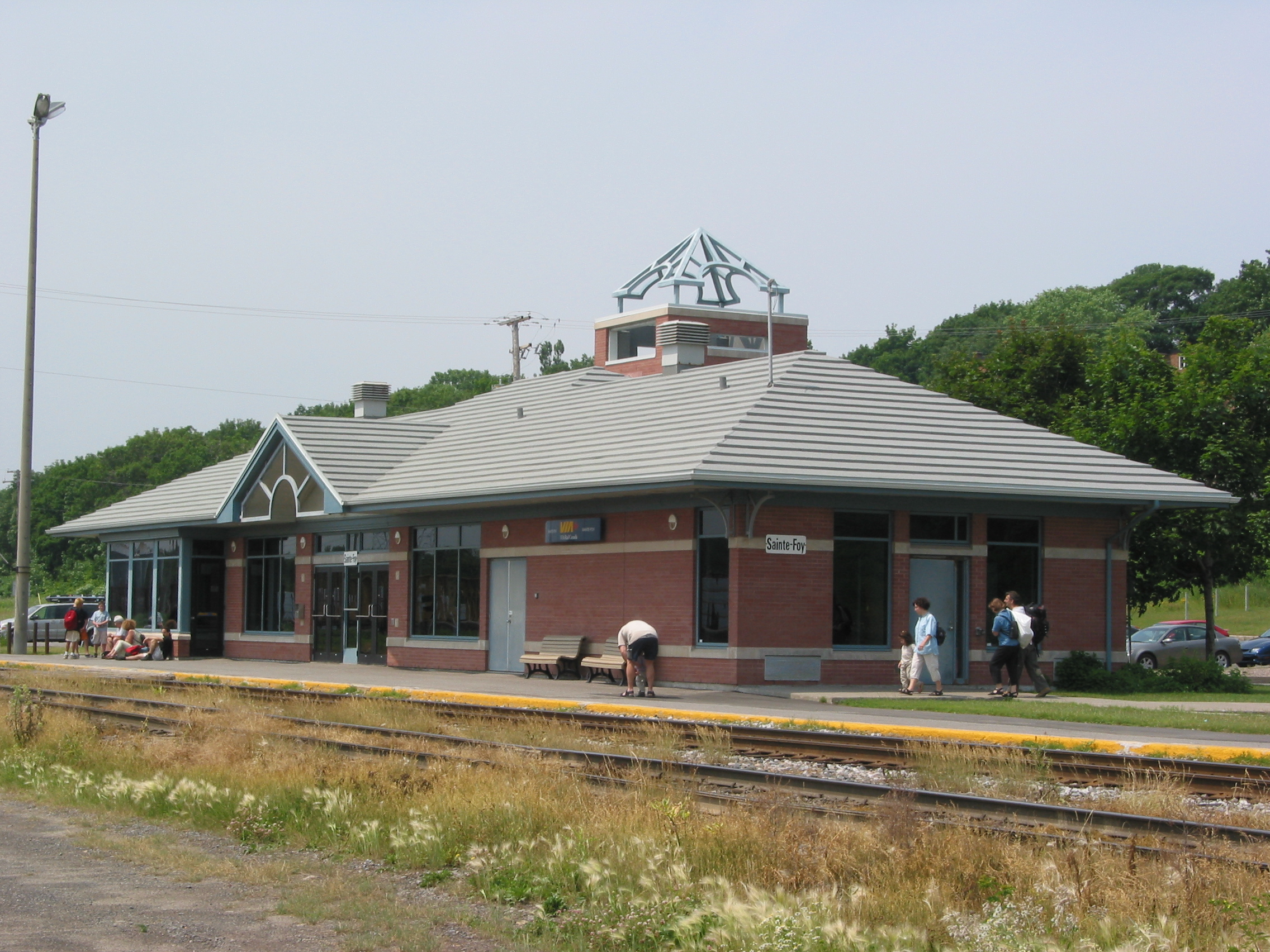
- Sainte-Foy railway station

General information
- Location: 3255, chemin de la Gare; Quebec City, Quebec; G1W 3A8
- Coordinates: 46.7543°N 71.2977°W
- System: Via Rail (Inter-city)
- Platforms: 1 side platform
- Tracks: 2
- Connections: RTC 76

Construction
- Platform levels: 1
- Parking: Yes
- Accessible: Yes

Other information
- Status: Staffed station

History
- Opened: 1976

Services
Preceding station	Via Rail	Following station
Drummondville toward Montreal	Ocean	Montmagny toward Halifax
Charny toward Ottawa	Ottawa–Québec City	Quebec City Terminus
Location

Sainte-Foy station is a Via Rail station in Quebec City, Quebec, Canada. it is located on Chemin de la Gare in the former city of Sainte-Foy. It is staffed and is wheelchair-accessible. The stations offers limited parking with three accessible spots.

It opened in 1976 as the Canadian National Railway's passenger station in the Quebec City region after downtown's Gare du Palais was closed. Canadian Pacific Railway passengers used a station in Cadorna. When Via Rail took over most passenger service in 1979, Sainte-Foy was the sole intercity rail station in the Quebec City area from 1979 to 1985, when Gare du Palais reopened.

It is served by Corridor trains coming to and from Ottawa, and is also the Quebec City area stop for the Ocean, Via's long-distance train to Atlantic Canada.

== Transit connections ==
The station is served by Réseau de transport de la Capitale bus route 76.
