= Gare du Palais =

Railway station in Quebec, Canada

Quebec City Railway Station (Gare du Palais)
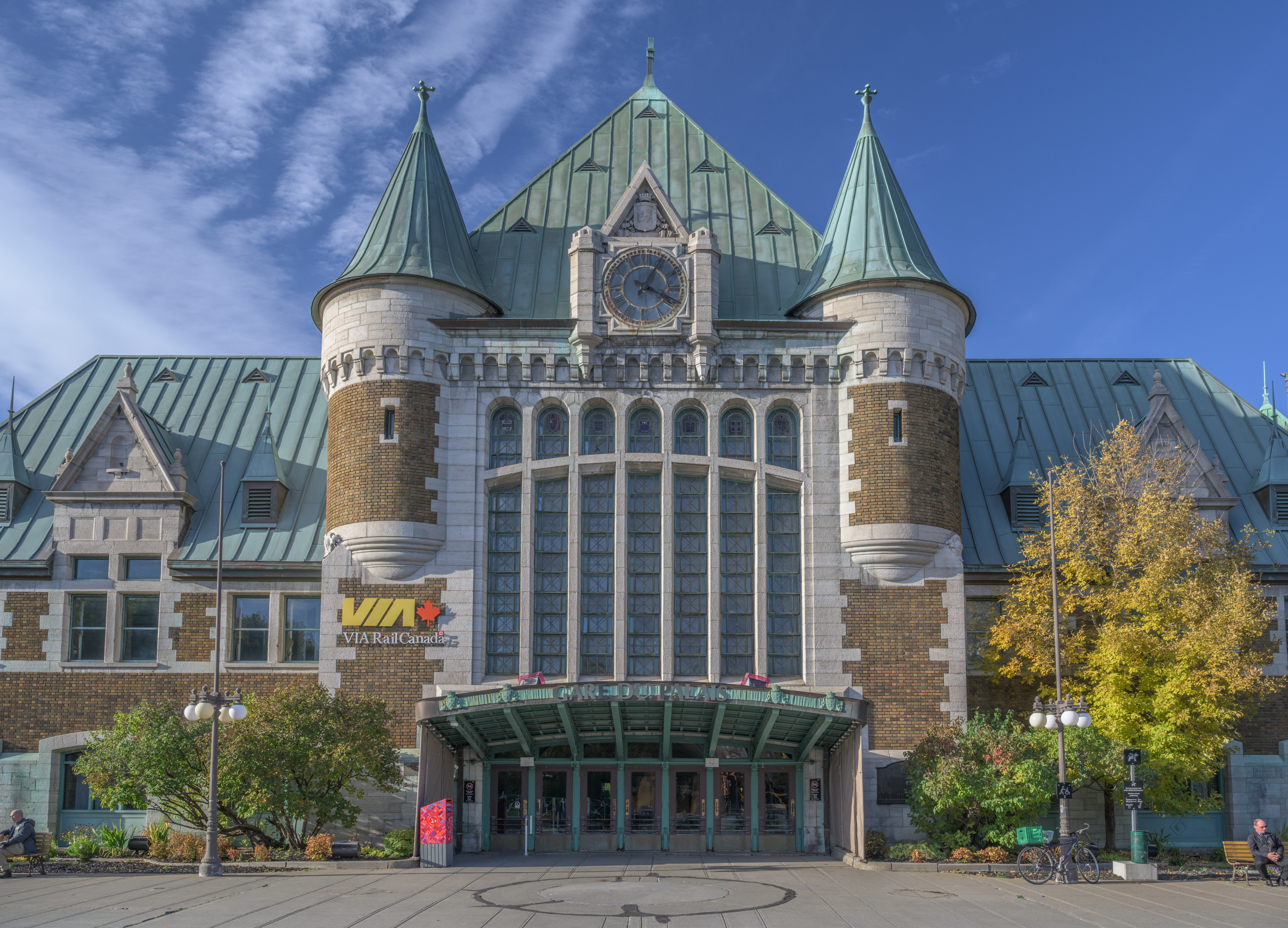
- Gare du Palais in Old Quebec

General information
- Location: 450, rue de la Gare du Palais; Quebec City, Quebec; G1K 3X2
- Coordinates: 46.8174°N 71.2139°W
- Owner: Via Rail
- Platforms: 2 Island
- Tracks: 4
- Bus operators: Intercar; La Québécoise; Orléans Express
- Connections: RTC

Construction
- Parking: Yes

Other information
- Status: Staffed station
- Station code: VIA Rail: QBEC
- IATA code: XLJ

History
- Opened: 1915; 111 years ago

Services
Preceding station	Via Rail	Following station
Sainte-Foy toward Ottawa	Ottawa–Québec City	Terminus
Former services
Preceding station	Canadian National Railway	Following station
Cap-Rouge toward Cochrane	Cochrane – Quebec	Terminus
Cap-Rouge toward Richmond	Richmond – Quebec; Local stops	Terminus
Terminus	Quebec – Chicoutimi	Limoilou toward Chicoutimi
Terminus	Quebec – McGivney	Cap-Rouge toward McGivney
Preceding station	Canadian Pacific Railway	Following station
Cadorna toward Montreal Windsor	Montreal – Quebec	Terminus
Location
- Location within Quebec City Location within Southern Quebec Location within Quebec Location within Canada

Gare du Palais (French pronunciation: [ɡaʁ dy palɛ], "Palace Station") is a train and bus station in Quebec City, Quebec, Canada. Its name comes from its proximity to the former location of the Palace of the Intendant of New France. It is served by Via Rail, Canada's national passenger railway, and by the private coach company Orléans Express.

Built in 1915 by the Canadian Pacific Railway, the two-storey châteauesque station is similar in design to the Château Frontenac hotel. The station had no passenger rail service from 1976 to 1985. It reopened in 1985, and is the eastern terminus of Via Rail's Corridor services in Ontario and Quebec, serving regular daily services west to Montreal's Central Station and Ottawa via Drummondville, for at most 10 trains per day. It was designated a Heritage Railway Station in 1992.

== History ==
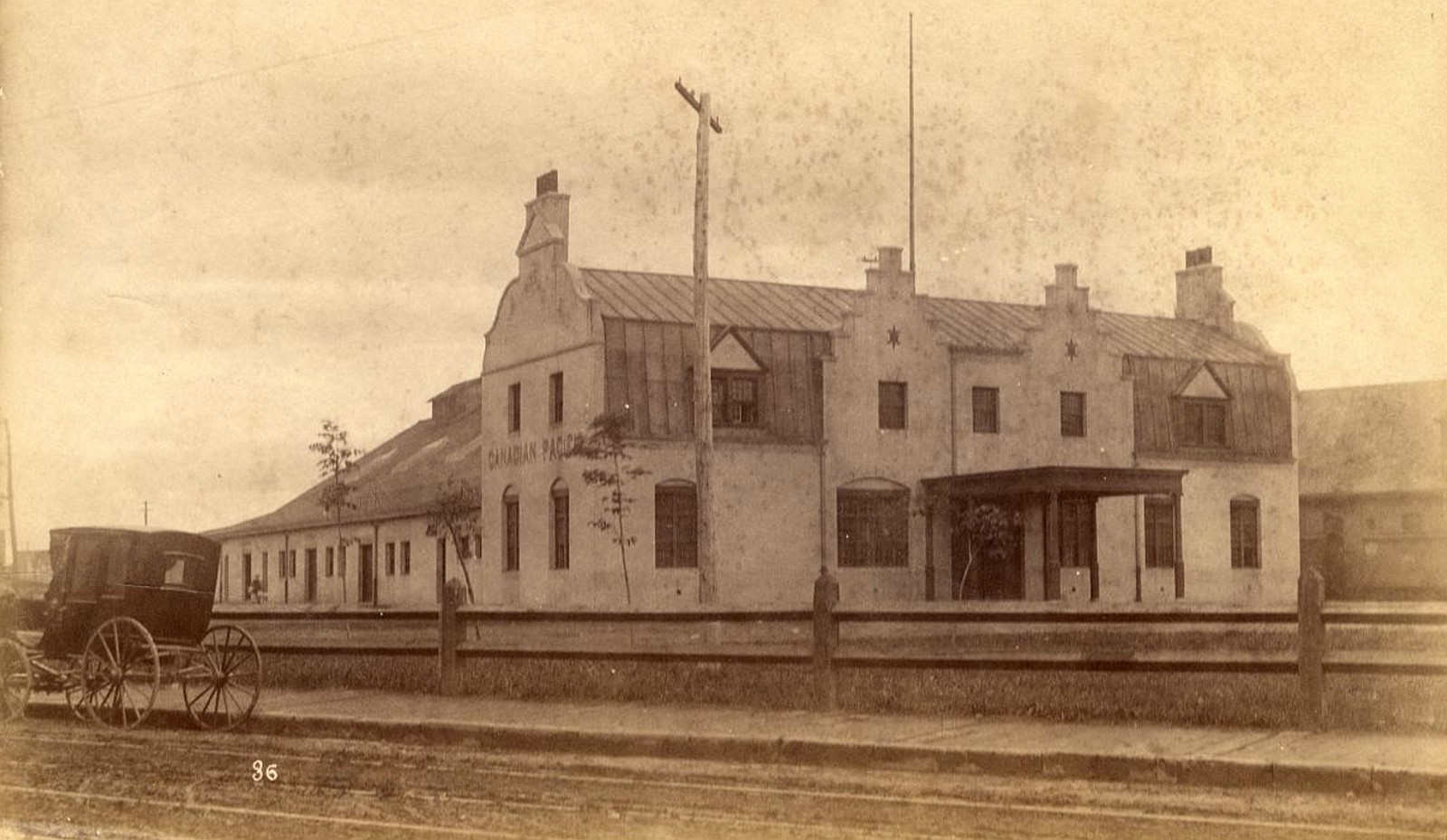
CPR Palais Station in 1894

From 1850, the rail revolution was expanding through Quebec Province and all of Canada. Quebec City stayed isolated on St. Lawrence River north shore; two private companies failed to get financing while Grand Trunk Railway lobbied against the possible competition in London. Finally, Quebec City granted $1 million to North Shore Railway (NSR), founded by Quebec's bourgeoisie, to connect Quebec and Montreal by rail. Around 1872, the NSR built the first Palais Station. In 1875, the lack of funds drove the NSR to transfer its assets to the Quebec Government which founded the Quebec, Montreal, Ottawa & Occidental Railway (QMO&OR). By the end of 1877, the QMO&OR had built the railway between Quebec and Ottawa. From 1880 to 1890, the Quebec and Lake St-John Railway (QLSJR) joined the QMO&OR to enter Quebec City from the west and reach Palais Station as indicated on the time tables of the period. In 1882, the QMO&OR sold the Montreal-Ottawa line to the Canadian Pacific Railway (CPR) and, the Quebec-Montreal line in 1885.

In 1915, the CPR built the present station designed by architect H. E. Prindel in the "Château de la Loire" style. "The exterior of the building was of Argenteuil granite, Deschambault limestone and Citadel brick with high sloping roofs of copper. A 40 foot window over the entrance contained the arms of seven of the historic names of Quebec: Montmagny, de Tracy, Beauharnois, Montcalm, Wolfe, Frontenac and Talon. At the bases of its turrets were cartouches bearing the French fleur de lys, the Tudor rose, the Scottish thistle and the Irish shamrock, respectively. High upon the roof was an ornamental clock with a dial eight feet in diameter topped with the city’s arms. The ticket lobby measured 65 x 45 feet with a clearance of 60 feet to a stained glass skylight inset with a map of the CPR. The concourse/waiting room measured 125 x 62 feet and 40 feet high. Cast into the interior brickwork on the walls were embossed heraldic symbols of the founding races".

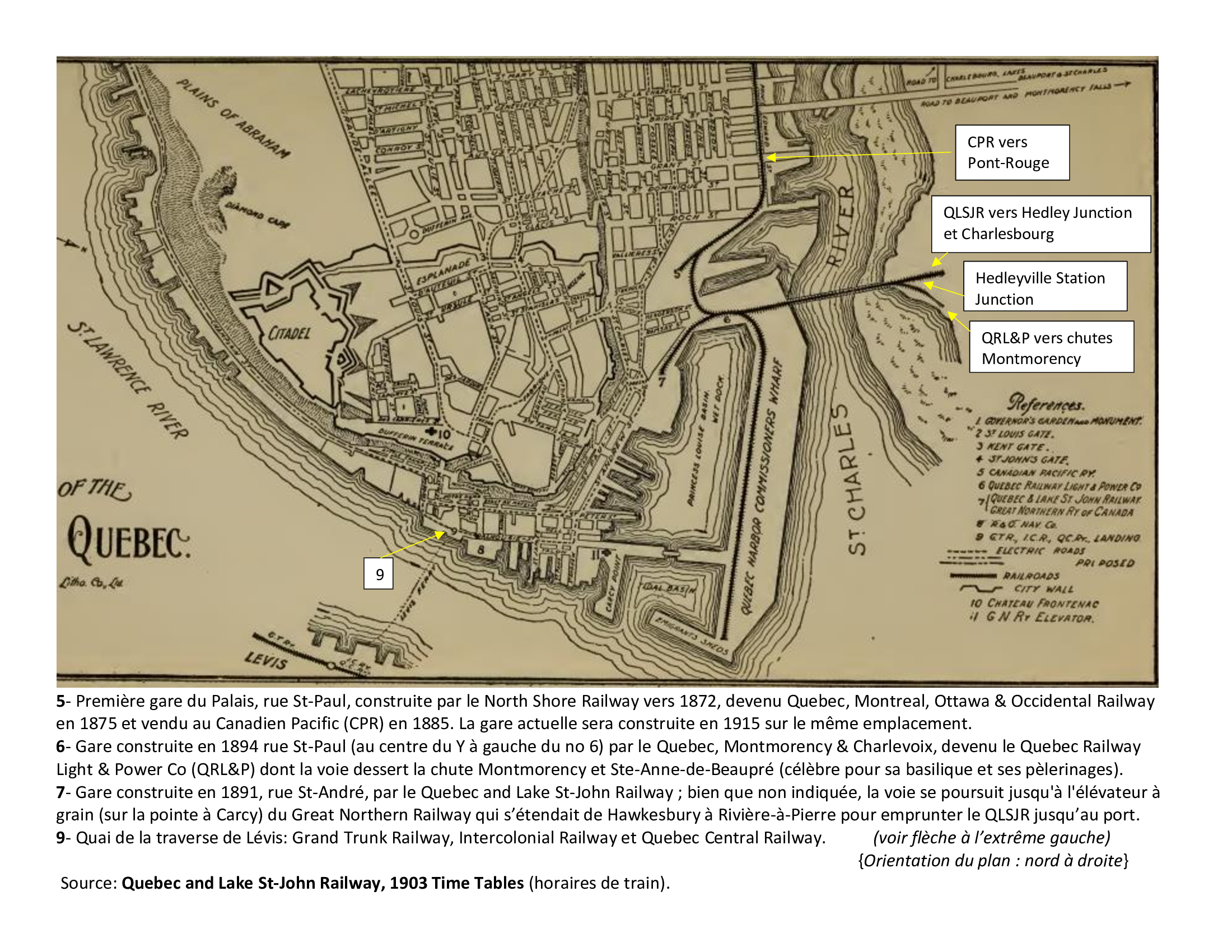
1903 map of 3 nearby stations

After Quebec Bridge construction in 1917, Palais Station was called a Union Station because the Canadian Pacific shared the facilities with the National Transcontinental Railway and the Quebec Central Railway; the Canadian National until 1929 used the former QLSJR station built in 1891 on Parent Square nearby. The Quebec Railway Light and Power also had its station nearby (former Quebec, Montmorency & Charlevoix). In fact, both Palais Stations received passengers from seven different railways: the Quebec, Montreal, Ottawa & Occidental Railway (became Canadian Pacific), the Quebec and Lake St-John Railway from 1880, the Great Northern Railway of Canada in 1900 (through QLSJR at Rivière-à-Pierre), the Quebec, Montmorency & Charlevoix (becomes Quebec Railway Light & Power Co.) after construction of the swing bridge on St-Charles River in 1891, the Canadian Northern Railway bought the Great Northern in 1907 and, in 1909, built a line from Garneau Junction north of Shawinigan to Hedley Junction of QLSJR, the National Transcontinental Railway in 1917 (third transcontinental after CPR and CNoR) and the Quebec Central Railway which used a ferry from Lévis to reach Quebec before the Quebec Bridge.

In 1918, many railways were nearly bankrupt and the Canadian Government (which created the problem by building the NTR in the underpopulated northern regions of the provinces) founded the Canadian National Railway to rationalize the rail industry and nationalize the QLSJR, the CNoR, the NTR and the Grand Trunk.

From the mid-1930s to the mid-1950s the station was the northern terminus of a passenger train route, the Connecticut Yankee, from New York City, up the Connecticut River Valley to Sherbrooke and Quebec.

In 1976, the Palais Station was expropriated by the city to build the Dufferin-Montmorency highway. The rails were removed up to Cadorna stop, Saint-Malo industrial park, where the CPR built a new station (3 miles west of Palais Station, near St-Sacrement street). The CNR used its Sainte-Foy station, west of Quebec's bridge. On December 2, 1979, Sainte-Foy station became the passenger station of Via Rail. On November 8, 1985, Palais Station reopened after a CA$28 million renovation. As the rails south of Saint-Charles river were removed, the trains have to run on the north side from Allenby crossing (CPR and National Transcontinental) on CNR Lairet division (built by CNoR) to Hedley Junction (QLSJR line from Rivière-à-Pierre was abandoned in 1997), then turns south and crosses Saint-Charles River and reach Palais Station. The Canadian Pacific Railway no longer reaches Palais Station since it sold its rails north of St. Lawrence River to Quebec Gatineau Railway.

== Origin of name ==
The station takes its name from Palais Street, which was named after the palace (now destroyed) of the Intendant of New France. The main entrance to the station is now on rue de la Gare-du-Palais (name changed in 1986.)

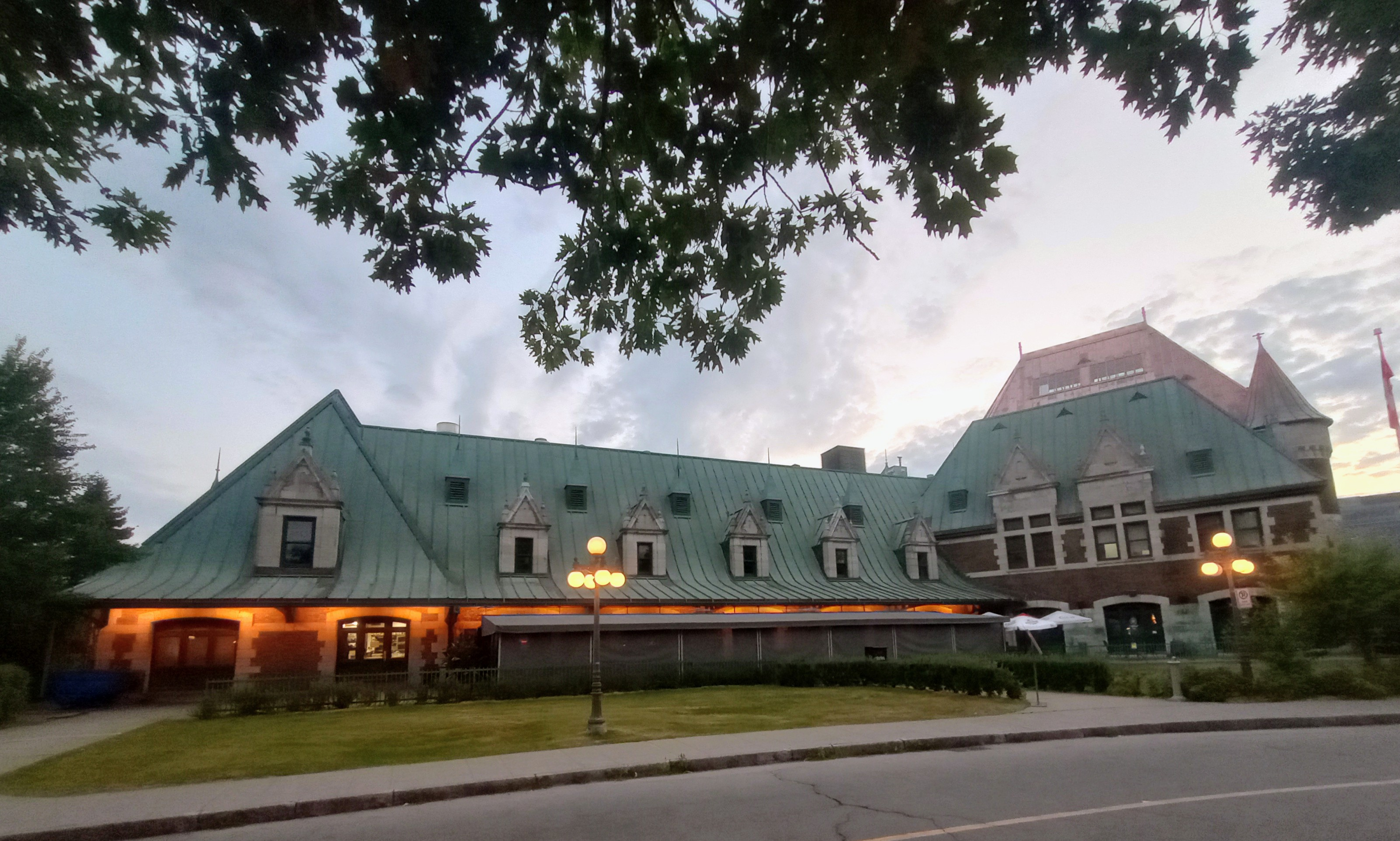
Gare du Palais seen in the early morning

== Intercity bus ==
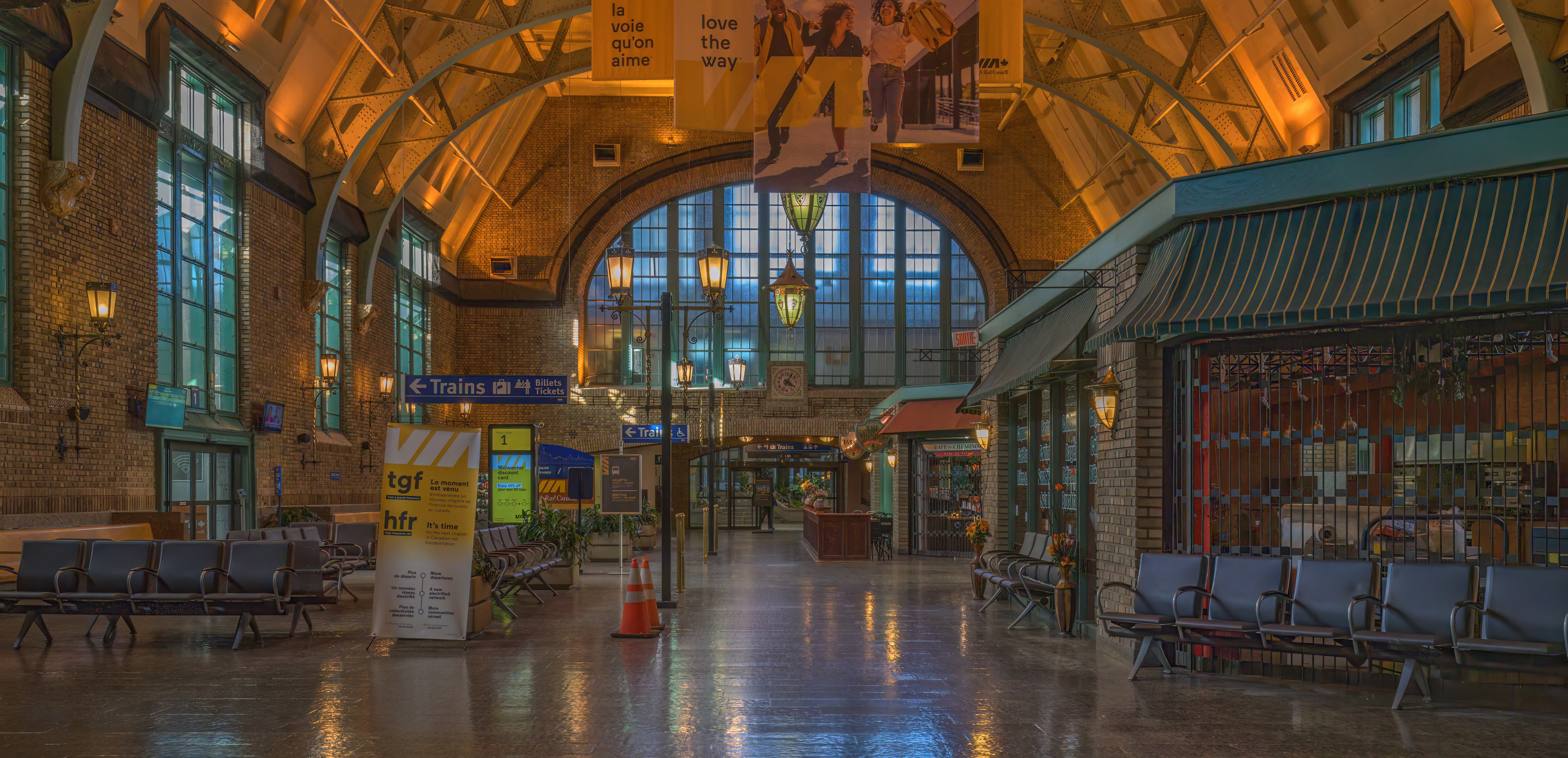
Interior of Gare du Palais

Gare du Palais is downtown Quebec City's intercity bus terminal.

Intercity coaches
Bus Company	Destinations
Autobus A1	Thetford Mines
Intercar	Alma, Saguenay, Baie-Comeau, Sept-Îles
Orléans Express	Trois-Rivières, Drummondville, Montreal, Rimouski, Gaspé

== See also ==
- Montreal Central Station
- Gare d'autocars de Montréal
