= McGivney, New Brunswick =

Settlement in New Brunswick, Canada

Coordinates: 46.364°N 67.567°W

Location of McGivney in New Brunswick

McGivney is a settlement in New Brunswick, located 14.78 km SW of Boiestown, on the Canadian National Railway line, in Stanley Parish, York County.

== History ==
A post office was active here from 1909 to 1974, when the settlement was known as McGivney Junction. One was also located here from 1955 until 1970.

McGivney, NB is where the CN Miramichi subdivision (McGivney - Newcastle) and the CN Nashwaak subdivision (McGivney - Fredericton) met the CN Napadogan subdivision (Moncton - Edmundston). Freight and passenger trains rolled through on the Napadogan sub, while local freights went north and south on the other two subdivisions. In time, the Miramichi and Nashwaak subdivisions were abandoned, and all that remains is the Napadogan subdivision with its occasional freight trains.

== No. 32 Ordnance Depot ==
Opened in 1942 on Highway #8 in the Village of McGivney as No. 1 Magazine Company, a detachment of No. 7 Ordnance Depot. The Depot, run by the Royal Canadian Ordnance Corps, consisted of 24 buildings. The Depot remained open after World War II and was renamed No. 2 Ordnance Depot, but not long after, it was changed to No. 32 Ordnance Depot. Permanent married quarters were added in the 1950s. As a result of the unification of the Canadian armed forces, the Depot was renamed No. 32 Canadian Forces Ammunition Depot in 1966, but this would be short-lived. The unification led to the consolidation of numerous military establishments. No. 32 CFAD was deemed redundant and as a result, closed in 1969.

Today some of the Depot's buildings remain, including the ammunition storage bunkers and less than half of the PMQs. The camp chapel is now a Baptist church and Sergeants’ Mess was relocated off site, for use as the South Portage Recreation Center.

== See also ==
- List of communities in New Brunswick
