= Moncton station =

Railway station in New Brunswick, Canada

Moncton
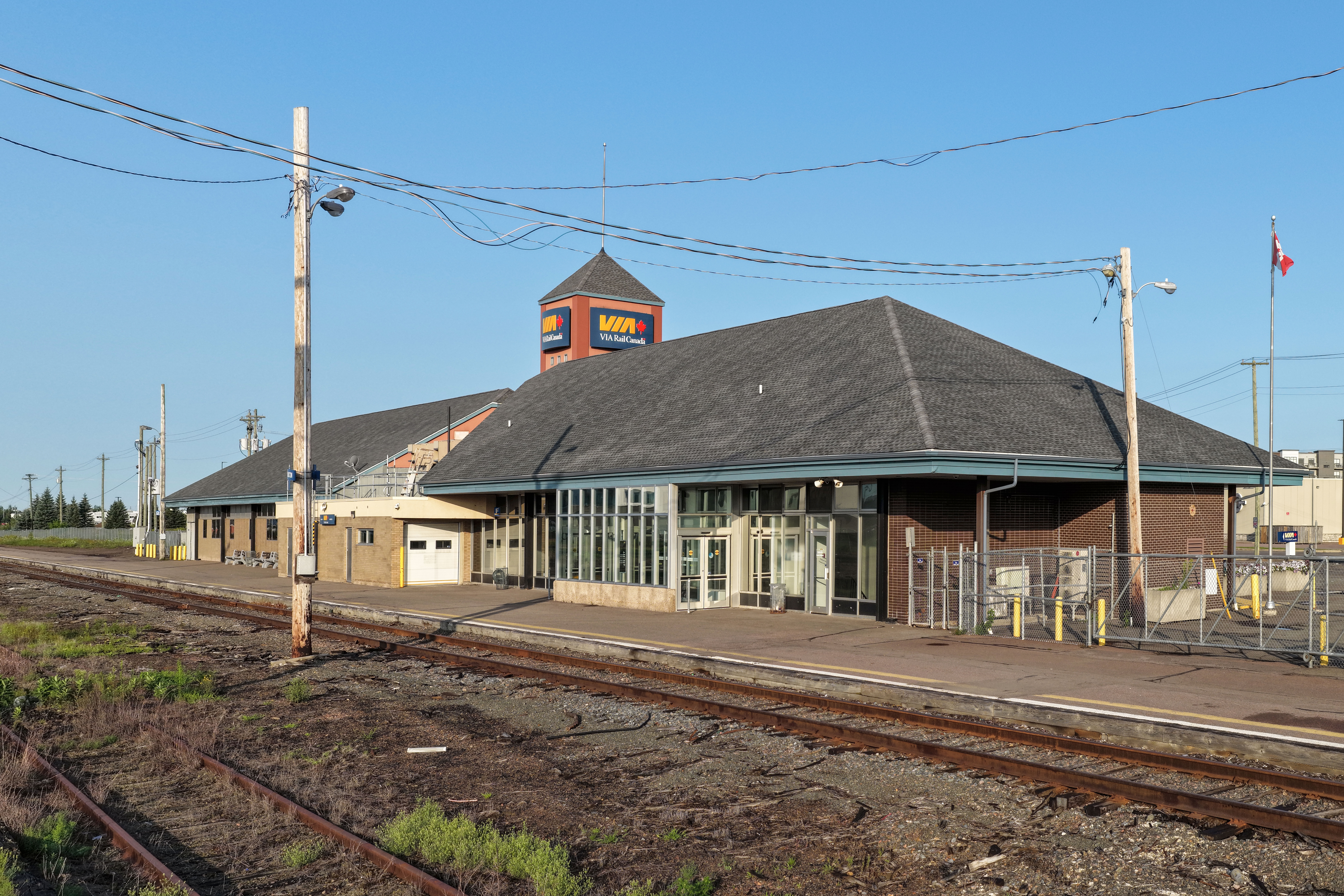

General information
- Location: 77 Canada Street; Moncton, NB; Canada
- Coordinates: 46°04′59″N 64°47′10″W
- Owner: Via Rail
- Tracks: 3
- Bus operators: Maritime Bus
- Connections: Codiac Transpo

Construction
- Structure type: Staffed station
- Parking: Yes
- Accessible: yes

Services
Preceding station	Via Rail	Following station
Rogersville toward Montreal	Ocean	Sackville toward Halifax
Former services
Preceding station	Via Rail	Following station
Petitcodiac toward Montreal	Atlantic	Sackville toward Halifax
Preceding station	Canadian National Railway	Following station
Lutesville toward Montreal	Montreal – Moncton	Terminus
Lutesville toward McGivney	McGivney – Moncton	Terminus
McKinnon toward St. John	St. John – Halifax	Sunny Brae toward Halifax
Terminus	Moncton – Buctouche	Humphrey toward Buctouche
Terminus	Moncton – Point Du Chene	Humphrey toward Point Du Chene
Location

The Moncton station is a railway and bus station in Moncton, New Brunswick, Canada. It serves Via Rail's Ocean passenger train and Maritime Bus intercity buses. It is located at 77 Canada Street beside Avenir Centre.
