= Halifax station (Nova Scotia) =

Railway station in Nova Scotia, Canada

Halifax
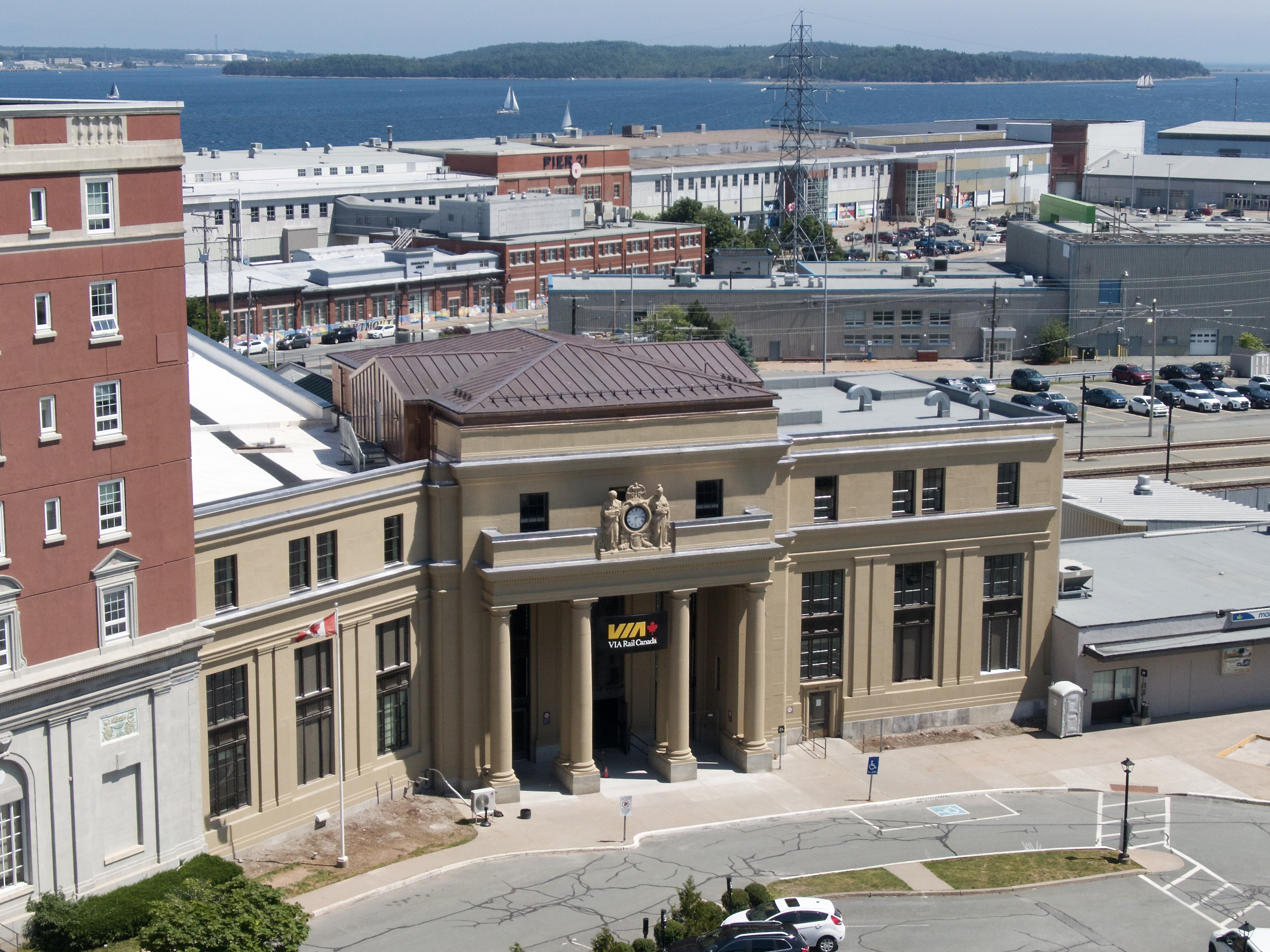

General information
- Location: 1161 Hollis Street; Halifax, Nova Scotia; B3J 2P6
- Coordinates: 44°38′22″N 63°34′05″W
- Owner: Via Rail
- Platforms: 3 island platforms
- Tracks: 4
- Bus operators: Maritime Bus (inter-city bus)
- Connections: Halifax Transit (public transit)

Construction
- Structure type: Heritage Railway Station
- Parking: Yes
- Cycle facilities: Yes
- Accessible: Yes

Other information
- Status: Staffed station
- Station code: HLFX
- IATA code: XDG
- Website: Halifax railway station

History
- Opened: 1928; 98 years ago
- Former names: Canadian National Railways

Services
Preceding station	Via Rail	Following station
Truro toward Montreal	Ocean	Terminus
Former Services
Preceding station	Via Rail	Following station
Truro toward Montreal	Atlantic	Terminus
Preceding station	Canadian National Railway	Following station
Armdale toward St. John	St. John – Halifax	Terminus
Preceding station	Dominion Atlantic Railway	Following station
Armdale toward Yarmouth	Main Line	Terminus
Location
- Location within Nova Scotia Location within Canada

Halifax station is an inter-city railway terminal in Halifax, Nova Scotia, Canada, operated by Via Rail.

== Current use ==
The station is the eastern terminus of the Ocean, Via Rail's eastern transcontinental train which operates between Montreal and Halifax; thus it is also the eastern terminus of Via Rail.

The Ocean is North America's longest running "named passenger train" as it was introduced by the Intercolonial Railway in 1904 to provide first-class rail passage between Halifax and Montreal.

In the early 2000s, the Acadian Lines inter-city bus company moved its Halifax terminal from Almon Street in the North End to the Halifax Railway Station.

The Halifax Railway Station adjoins the Westin Nova Scotian Hotel, a former railway hotel that was built and owned by Canadian National Railways, which also built the station. CN divested the hotel during the 1980s and it is currently operated under the Westin Hotels banner.

== History ==
The Halifax railway station continues the history of passenger rail service to the city and is the eastern terminus of North America's passenger rail network.

=== Predecessor stations ===
==== Richmond station (1858–1877) ====
The first railway station in Halifax was opened by the Nova Scotia Railway at that line's southern terminus along the Halifax Harbour at Richmond in 1858. The location was a considerable distance northward from downtown Halifax. The extension of the line to the south was blocked by concerns that locomotive embers would threaten the Royal Navy Dockyard located to the south. The first station was a large, plain wooden building with enclosed platforms. A horse-drawn street railway connected the station to the downtown.

==== North Street station (1877–1920) ====
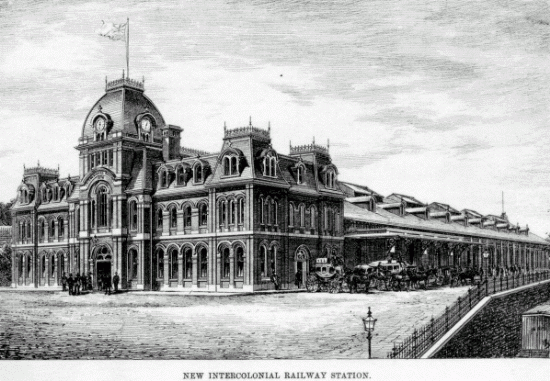
The North Street station in 1878

The NSR was taken over by the Government of Canada in 1867 as one of the terms of Confederation. In 1877, a new federal Crown corporation, the Intercolonial Railway (ICR), opened a magnificent new terminal railway station at the foot of North Street, south of Richmond and much closer to the city's downtown. This impressive Second Empire structure known as the North Street Station was designed by David Stirling, who also designed the Provincial Building and St. David's Presbyterian Church on Grafton Street. The station was faced by the King Edward Hotel, located immediately west of the station, which stood roughly beneath the present-day Angus L. Macdonald Bridge where it crosses Barrington Street opposite the main gate to HMC Dockyard. The North Street Station and the waterfront terminal trackage leading to it were badly damaged in the Halifax Explosion on 6 December 1917. Passenger trains were temporarily diverted to the unfinished south end terminal tracks for two days. However the North Street Station was quickly repaired to enable it to operate another two years before closing in 1920.

==== South End terminal project ====
The ICR's owner the Government of Canada, announced at a Halifax Board of Trade luncheon on 30 October 1912 that plans were being drafted for a major railway and shipping terminal at Greenbank, near Point Pleasant Park in the city's South End.

A route for the railway was chosen along the western side of the Halifax Peninsula bordering the Northwest Arm by F.W. Cowie, a government engineer. This project required a deep cut extending up to 100 feet deep through solid Halifax slate for 8 kilometres (5.0 mi) to connect with the main line at Fairview. 16 arched concrete road bridges were to span this trench to maintain connections for the street network.

The official start of construction is dated 31 July 1913 and equipment was moved into Halifax by the fall. Crews proceeded from the north, with trains hauling the rock to the southwestern corner of Bedford Basin where it was dumped in front of Mt. St. Vincent College to create the ICR's new classification yard. Crews working from the south hauled the rock to dump into Halifax Harbour, creating new deepwater shipping piers and dockside warehouses that were called the Halifax Ocean Terminal. The crews met in the fall of 1917 but several years of work remained before the trackage and docks would be operational.

A trans-Atlantic Ocean liner passenger terminal was planned for the Ocean Terminal piers (later Pier 21) and the ICR had plans to build a larger railway station and adjoining hotel, however Canada was deeply committed to the First World War and the North Street Station continued to be the only railway station serving the city.

The plans to shift to a south end station were accelerated in late 1917 when much of the North End tracks and facilities were badly damaged by the Halifax Explosion.

==== The "Temporary" station (1920–1930) ====
Meanwhile, the ICR was merged into a new federal Crown corporation, the Canadian National Railways (CNR) in 1918. The CNR opted to locate a temporary new passenger station in the Halifax Ocean Terminal project at the south end of the city that fall and on 22 December 1918, the Maritime Express departed for the first time from the new (temporary) south end station. The station was a long, single-story brick structure. Although considered "temporary", it operated for ten years.

=== New South End station (1930–present) ===
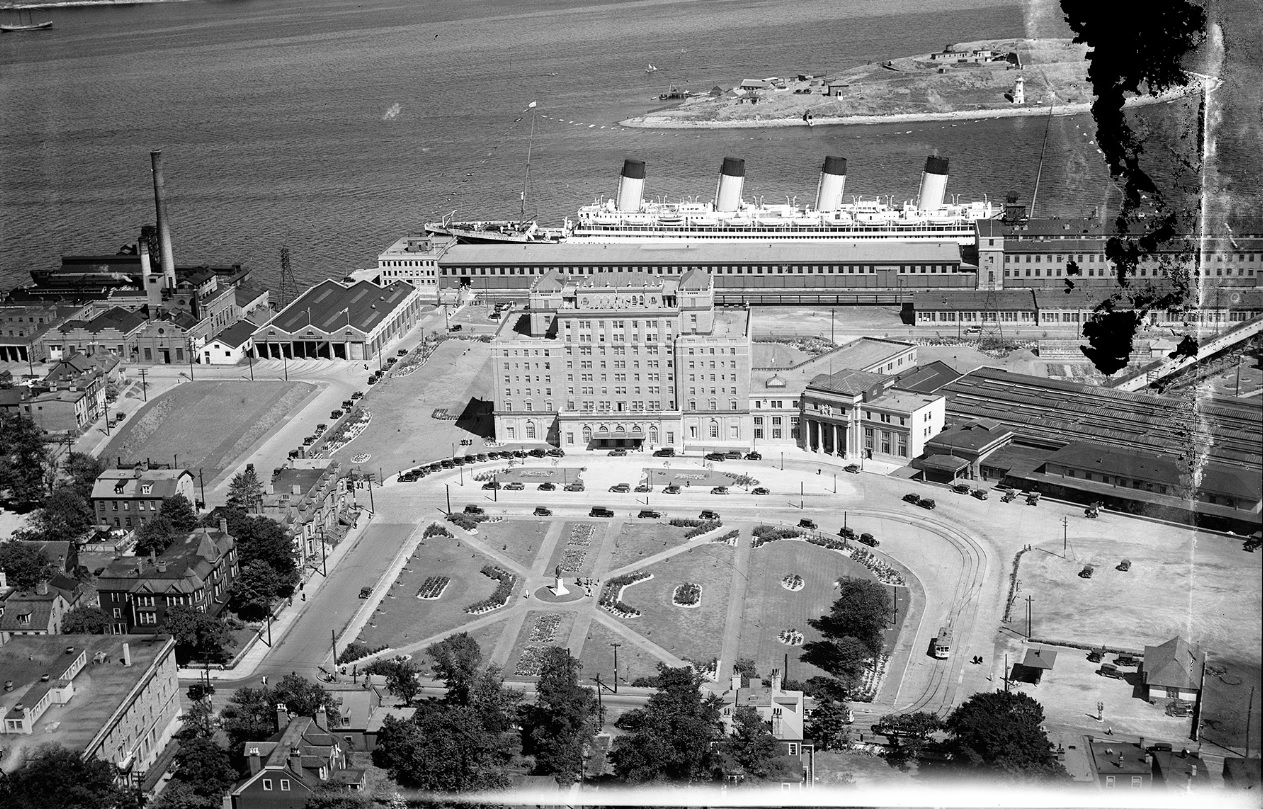
The newly built station alongside the Hotel Nova Scotian in 1931, with RMS Olympic docked at Pier 21

By the mid-1920s, CNR and the federal government were able to agree on building a new Union station passenger terminal near the Halifax Ocean Terminals which included the new ocean liner passenger terminal at Pier 21. The union station would serve not only CN but also the Canadian Pacific Railway's Nova Scotia subsidiary, Dominion Atlantic Railway which operated passenger trains from Yarmouth, Digby and the Annapolis Valley into Halifax using trackage rights over CNR from Windsor Junction to the Halifax Ocean Terminal.

The new, and present, station opened on June 19, 1930 at the south end of Hollis Street, opposite Cornwallis Park. The structure is constructed of white limestone and has a colonnaded entry off Hollis Street. Inside, the Ticket Lobby has a high arched ceiling with a seated waiting area and ticketing/baggage counters. At the time of its construction, the station had a massive covered train shed which extended for 1,500 feet south over the station tracks to protect passengers boarding and disembarking from the weather. The earlier 1920 "temporary" station was converted to an attached baggage and express shed. CNR also had a coach yard with repair/service shop facilities for its passenger train equipment immediately southwest of the station's trainshed. Finally, a turn-table was located immediately southeast of the trainshed to permit locomotives and cars to be turned around, since the station was a stub-end terminal.

Displayed beside the new station was the 1839 locomotive Samson, the oldest in Canada. It remained on display until 1950 when it was moved to Stellarton, Nova Scotia.

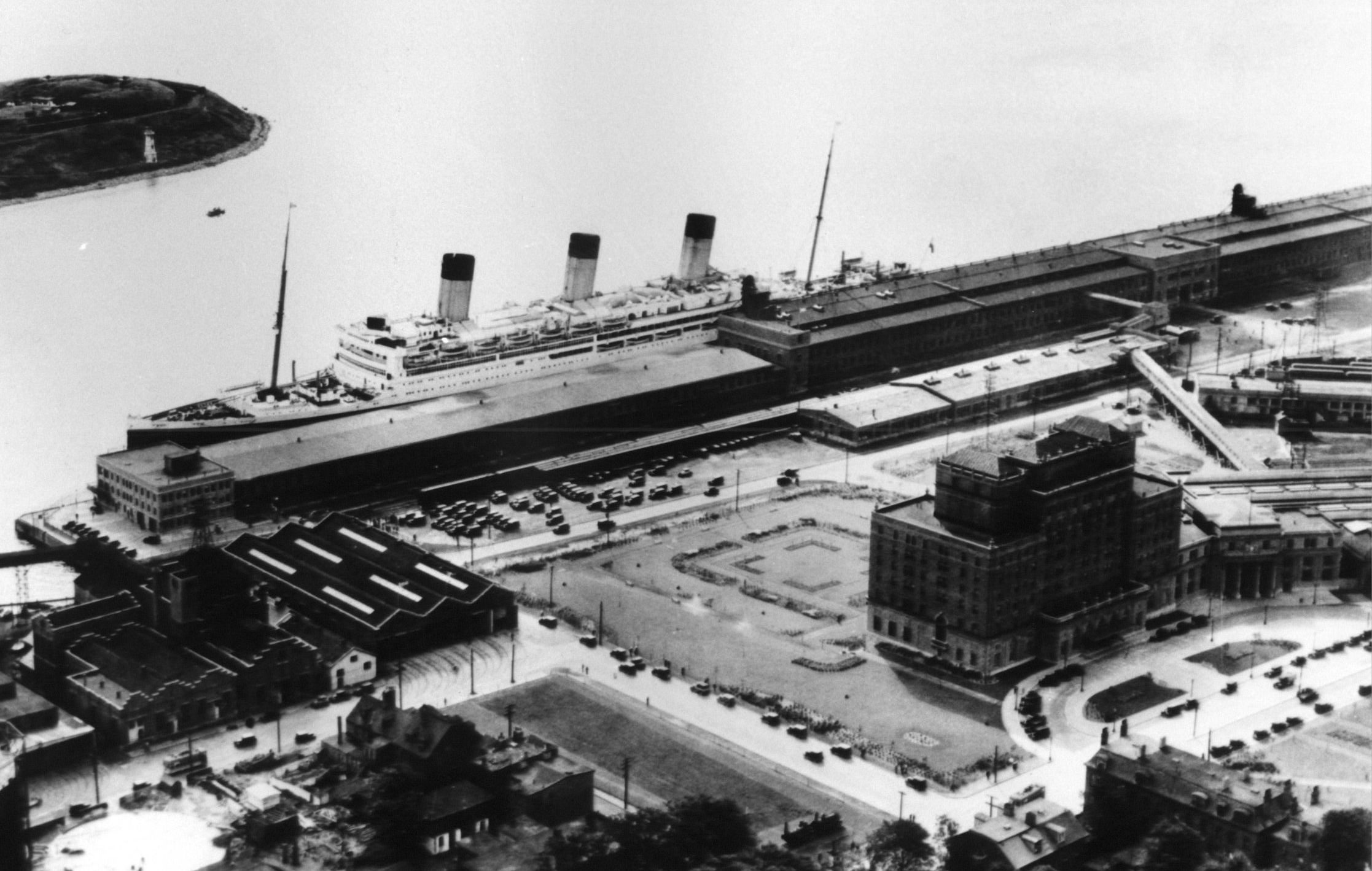
Ocean Terminals in 1934 the RMS Majestic docked at Pier 21. Halifax Station is on the far right beside the Hotel Nova Scotian and Samson is at lower centre.

An adjoining CNR Hotel, the Hotel Nova Scotian, was also built as part of the same project, although it opened 2 years later on 23 June 1930 and has a markedly different, yet complementary, architecture style.

The new station and the adjoining Hotel Nova Scotian were connected to the nearby Pier 21 ocean liner passenger terminal by an overhead walkway that crossed the numerous sidings feeding the ocean terminal sheds. Frequently, CNR passenger trains connecting to ships would operate to the Halifax Ocean Terminal, then back into the Halifax Railway Station afterward, or vice versa. A booking office for immigrants and platforms at Ocean Terminal served as an auxiliary station for special colonist car trains when large numbers of immigrants arrived.

The station saw intensive traffic during World War Two, moving military personnel to East Coast bases and overseas. Station use declined in the postwar period as part of the broad loss of rail passenger traffic. Locals runs, which also served as suburban trains for Halifax, were the first to be discontinued. CN cut one of its three daily Halifax-Montreal trains, the Maritime Express during the early 1970s, leaving only Scotian and the Ocean Limited, along with various local services to New Brunswick and Sydney provided by Dayliners. The Dominion Atlantic Railway also gradually reduced departures to a single daily voyage in each direction from the Halifax Railway Station to Yarmouth via Kentville and Digby.

=== Changes in the late 20th century ===
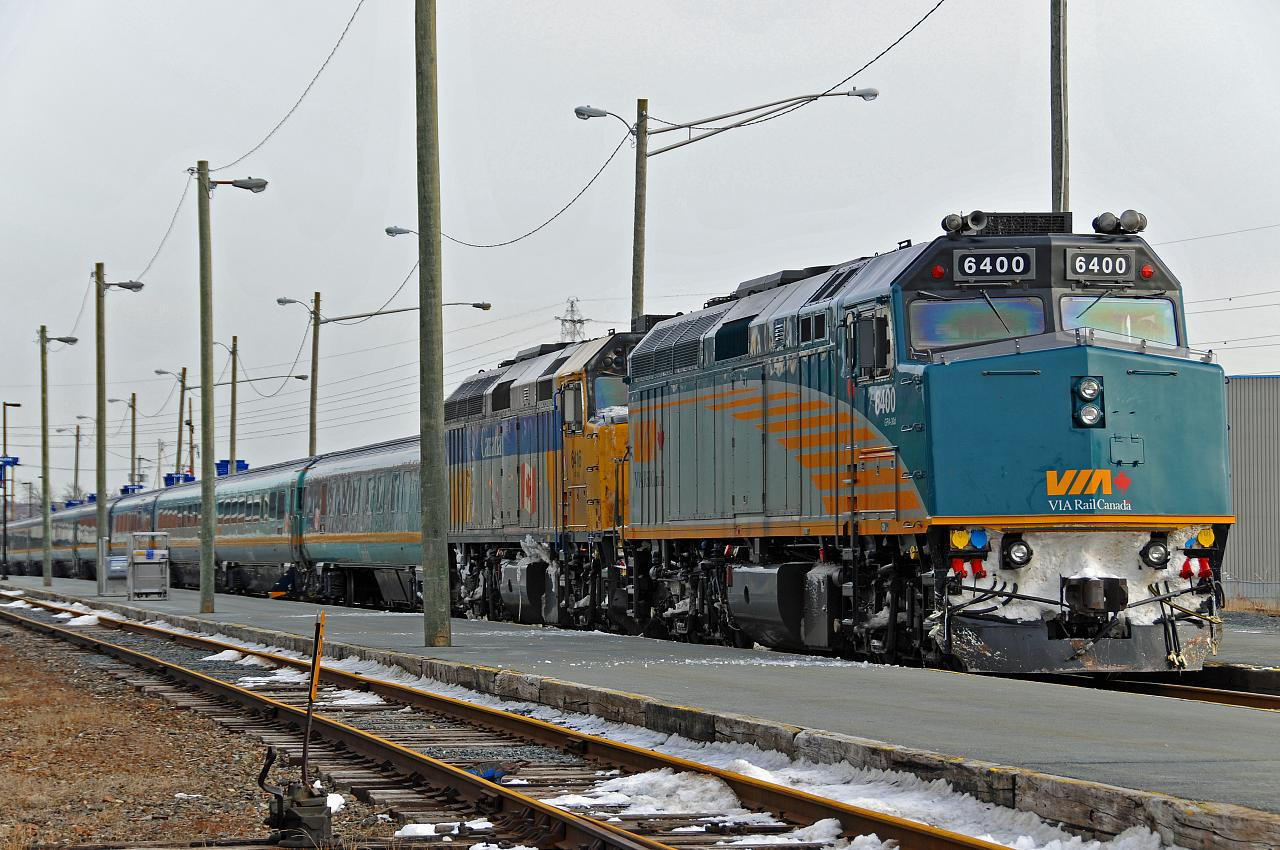
The Ocean at Halifax in 2008.

In 1978, CN and CP turned over their passenger services to new federal Crown corporation, Via Rail. Via Rail replaced the Scotian with a former CP train, the Atlantic which was extended from its eastern terminus at Saint John to Halifax. Budget cuts in 1981 saw the Atlantic service cancelled, however it was restored in 1985 and the Ocean was dropped from Halifax when its eastern terminus was moved west to Moncton.

During the 1980s, Via Rail continued to implement changes to the Halifax Railway Station. The train shed was demolished after requiring major repairs to its roof. The former CN coach yard facilities were closed and the site razed after a Via opened its new Halifax Maintenance Centre a rebuild of Canadian Naitional's old car shops near the turntable southeast of the station. The maintenance centre was responsible for overhauling and repairing the numerous Dayliners and many of the cars that operated on the long-distance trains in the Maritimes.

The station building was renovated at a cost of C$1.6 million over six months in 1988, a project that restored many of the original heritage features. The passenger waiting area was increased in size, from 5,000 square feet to over 8,500 square feet. The false ceiling was removed, exposing the original 24-foot ceiling, which was restored along with the original skylight. The station building was officially reopened on 20 June 1988 by Halifax member of parliament Stewart McInnes, Halifax mayor Ron Wallace, and VIA Rail president Denis de Belleval.

Major budget cuts were announced to Via Rail in the 1989 federal budget which resulted in over 50% of Via services cut on 15 January 1990. The impact on the Halifax Railway Station included cancellations of Dayliner service on the routes from Halifax to Sydney, Yarmouth, Saint John, Edmundston, and Campbellton. The Ocean was also cut from 7 days/week to 3 days/week, but restored to its eastern terminus at the Halifax Railway Station, and the Atlantic was cut from 7 days/week to 3 days/week, sharing its equipment with the Ocean. The Halifax Maintenance Centre was closed and sold for commercial use as workshops, warehouse and film production space. The station turntable was dismantled and filled it. Locomotives and passenger cars needing to change direction used a balloon track through the Port of Halifax's South End Container Terminal.

The Halifax station was given federal heritage protection in 1991 when it was designated a Heritage Railway Station under the newly passed Heritage Railway Stations Protection Act.

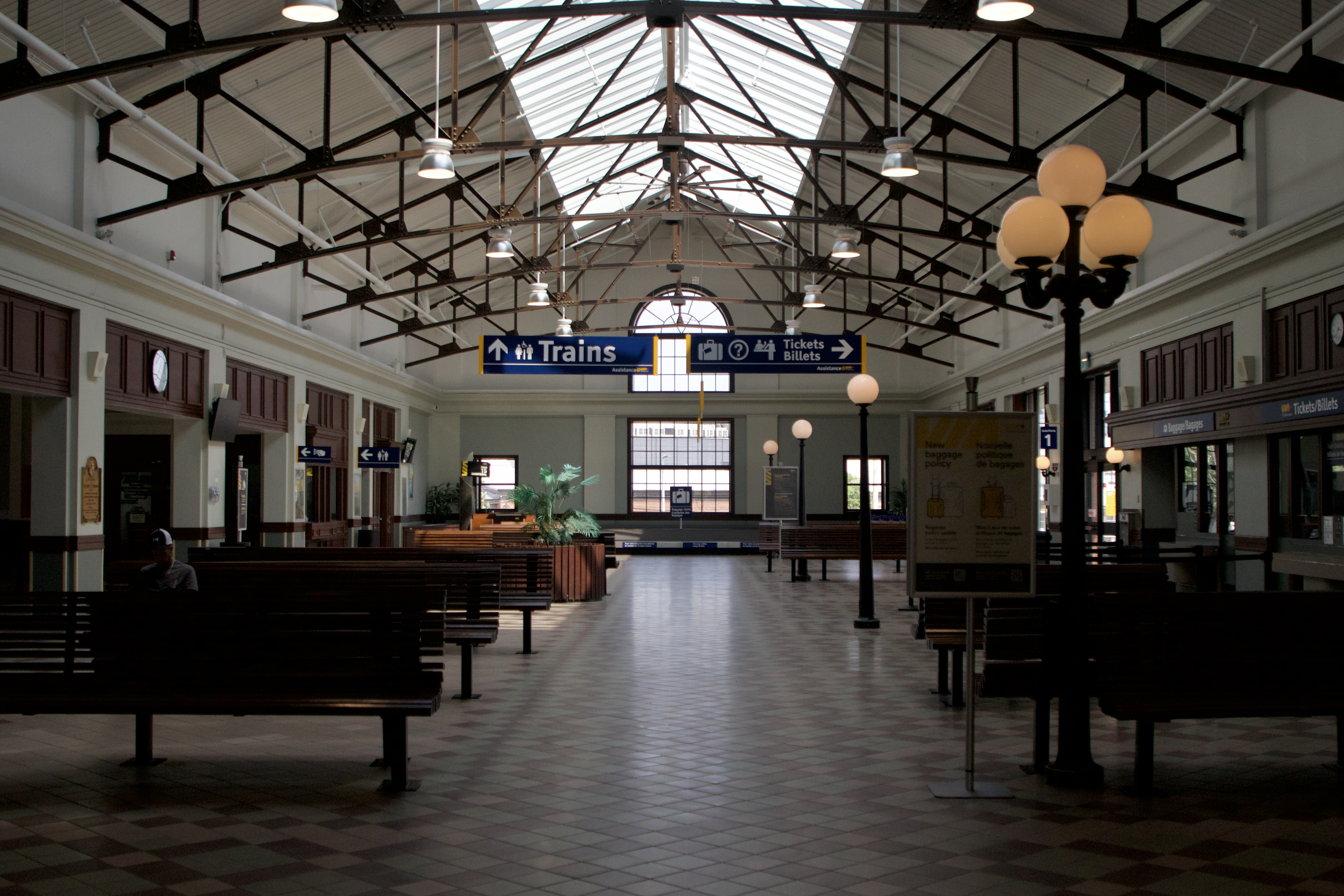
Interior of the Halifax train station

A 1994 change to Via Rail routes in the Maritimes saw the Atlantic discontinued and the Ocean upgraded to 6 days/week, however the train frequency at Halifax was not affected. In 2000, the Acadian Lines intercity bus company shifted its service from its Bus Station on Almon Street to the Halifax Railway Station, taking over the stub of the station's old baggage and express shed. The station remains connected by an interior walkway to the old Hotel Nova Scotian, now the Westin Nova Scotian. The South End Container Terminal balloon track, used to turn around locomotives and passenger cars, was taken out of service in late 2020 to create more storage space for containers; the balloon tracks were severed in the fall of 2021. As a result, the two F40PH passenger locomotives are coupled "back to back", unique for Via Rail trains, to allow the locomotives to couple to the opposite end of train in Halifax for the return trip to Montreal. This also resulted in the dropping of the iconic Park car (customarily the trail end dome car on Via's long-distance trains) from the Ocean train consist as it needed to be turned after arrival.
