= List of historic places in Gaspésie-Îles-de-la-Madeleine =

This is a list of historic places in Gaspésie-Îles-de-la-Madeleine, Quebec, entered on the Canadian Register of Historic Places, whether they are federal, provincial, or municipal. All addresses are the administrative Region 11. For all other listings in the province of Quebec, see List of historic places in Quebec.

Name	Address	Coordinates	Government recognition (CRHP №)	Wikidata ID	Image
Maison Théodore-Jean-Lamontagne	170, 1ere Avenue Est; Sainte-Anne-des-Monts QC	49°07′57″N 66°28′25″W	Quebec (6385)		More images
Vieille prison de Sainte-Anne-des-Monts	74, 1e Avenue Ouest; Sainte-Anne-des-Monts QC	49°07′45″N 66°29′27″W	Quebec (12445)		
Église de Sainte-Anne-des-Monts	1e Avenue Est; Sainte-Anne-des-Monts QC	49°07′49″N 66°29′12″W	Quebec (13233)		More images
Site historique de La Grave	Les Iles-de-la-Madeleine QC	47°14′13″N 61°50′09″W	Quebec (6988)		More images
Fumoirs de la Pointe-Basse	27, Chemin du Quai Nord; Les Iles-de-la-Madeleine QC	47°31′47″N 61°42′32″W	Quebec (8305)		
École Saint-Joseph	638, Route 199 (Havre-aux-Maisons); Les Iles-de-la-Madeleine QC	47°24′20″N 61°47′28″W	Quebec (8306)		Upload Photo
Vieux couvent de Havre-aux-Maisons	292, Route 199 (Havre-aux-Maisons); Les Iles-de-la-Madeleine QC	47°23′54″N 61°49′04″W	Quebec (8307)		More images
Phare du Borgot	Chemin du Phare (L'Etang-du-Nord); Les Iles-de-la-Madeleine QC	47°23′05″N 61°57′33″W	Quebec (8422)		More images
Église de Saint-François-Xavier	Chemin du Bassin; Les Iles-de-la-Madeleine QC	47°13′20″N 61°55′57″W	Quebec (8424)		More images
Phare de l'Anse-à-la-Cabane	Chemin du Phare (Havre-Aubert); Les Iles-de-la-Madeleine QC	47°12′45″N 61°58′19″W	Federal (10713), Quebec (8717)		More images
Phare du Cap-Alright	Chemin des Echoueries; Les Iles-de-la-Madeleine QC	47°23′28″N 61°46′25″W	Federal (20660), Quebec (8971)		More images
Église Saint-Peter's-By-the-Sea	route Principale; Grosse-Ile QC	47°34′18″N 61°29′12″W	Quebec (10990)		More images
Presbytère du Havre-aux-Maisons	288, Route 199 (Havre-aux-Maisons); Les Iles-de-la-Madeleine QC	47°23′54″N 61°49′06″W	Quebec (11044)		Upload Photo
École d'Old-Harry	787, route Principale; Grosse-Ile QC	47°34′27″N 61°28′43″W	Quebec (11461)		Upload Photo
Église de Saint-Pierre-de-La Vernière	Chemin de La Verniere; Les Iles-de-la-Madeleine QC	47°22′16″N 61°54′26″W	Quebec (11999)		
Presbytère du Bassin	574, Chemin du Bassin; Les Iles-de-la-Madeleine QC	47°13′21″N 61°55′55″W	Quebec (13612)		
Église All Saints	Chemin School; Les Iles-de-la-Madeleine QC	47°16′23″N 61°42′36″W	Les Iles-de-la-Madeleine municipality (8219)		
Phare de l'Île-Brion	Les Iles-de-la-Madeleine QC	47°47′05″N 61°30′20″W	Les Iles-de-la-Madeleine municipality (8516)		More images
Phare de l'Île-d'Entrée	Route 199 (Grande-Entree); Les Iles-de-la-Madeleine QC	47°16′06″N 61°42′18″W	Les Iles-de-la-Madeleine municipality (8970)		More images
Maison René-Lévesque	16, rue Mount Sorel; New Carlisle QC	48°00′29″N 65°19′42″W	Quebec (4840)		Upload Photo
Magasin général J.-A.-Gendron	347, boulevard Perron Ouest; New Richmond QC	48°10′58″N 65°53′23″W	Quebec (4932)		Upload Photo
Site historique du Banc-de-Pêche-de-Paspébiac	Paspébiac QC	48°01′16″N 65°15′15″W	Quebec (4941)		More images
Maison Busteed	Rang Restigouche; Pointe-a-la-Croix QC	48°0′41.652″N 66°44′17.232″W	Quebec (5500)	Q24034970	More images
Cap-des-Rosiers Lighthouse	Highway 132; Cap-des-Rosiers QC	48°51′23″N 64°12′04″W	Federal (7403, (4383)		More images
Église Saint-Phillip	Route 132 Ouest; Port-Daniel–Gascons QC	48°11′39″N 64°51′35″W	Port-Daniel–Gascons municipality (8420)		Upload Photo
Pont couvert de Saint-Edgar	Avenue des Ponts; New Richmond QC	48°14′00″N 65°43′40″W	Quebec (14082), New Richmond municipality (9795)		More images
Arrondissement naturel de Percé	Percé QC	48°31′17″N 64°12′51″W	Quebec (10526)		
Site du patrimoine de l'Église-de-Saint-Bonaventure	Avenue de Grand-Pre; Bonaventure QC	48°02′42″N 65°29′30″W	Bonaventure municipality (10715)		
Phare de la pointe Bonaventure	Bonaventure QC	48°02′08″N 65°28′59″W	Bonaventure municipality (11217)		More images
La Neigière	Caplan QC	48°06′51″N 65°44′06″W	Caplan municipality (11268)		Upload Photo
Maison Le Page	266, Chemin Bougainville; Percé QC	48°39′23″N 64°15′52″W	Percé municipality (12377)		Upload Photo
Banc de Pêche de Paspébiac	Paspébiac QC	48°01′16″N 65°15′17″W	Federal (12623)		
Couvent Notre-Dame	5, Boulevard Gerard-D.-Levesque Est; Paspébiac QC	48°01′47″N 65°14′54″W	Paspébiac municipality (13256)		Upload Photo
Site du Mont-Saint-Joseph	Rue de la Montagne; Carleton-sur-Mer QC	48°08′04″N 66°06′55″W	Carleton-sur-Mer municipality (13269)		
Site archéologique de Pabos	Rue de la Plage; Chandler QC	48°19′34″N 64°41′46″W	Quebec (13804)		Upload Photo
Centre d'héritage britannique de la Gaspésie	351, Boulevard Perron Ouest; New Richmond QC	48°10′58″N 65°53′26″W	New Richmond municipality (13928)		Upload Photo
Presbytère de Notre-Dame-du-Mont-Carmel	1, Route 132; Port-Daniel–Gascons QC	48°11′00″N 64°57′38″W	Port-Daniel–Gascons municipality (14837)		Upload Photo
Site du patrimoine de New Richmond	New Richmond QC	48°09′43″N 65°51′36″W	New Richmond municipality (14839)		
Église de Cap-Chat	Rue Notre-Dame; Cap-Chat QC	49°05′50″N 66°41′17″W	Cap-Chat municipality (15233)		More images
Site patrimonial de la Cabane-à-Eudore	Carleton-sur-Mer QC	48°05′42″N 66°07′29″W	Carleton-sur-Mer municipality (15323)		
Église de Saint-Jospeph	Boulevard Perron; Carleton-sur-Mer QC	48°06′06″N 66°06′33″W	Carleton-sur-Mer municipality (15337)		
Maison William-Wakeham	186, Rue de la Reine; Gaspé QC	48°49′39″N 64°29′17″W	Quebec (5501)		Upload Photo
Moulin des Plourde	Boulevard Renard Ouest; Gaspé QC	48°59′45″N 64°23′46″W	Quebec (10281)		Upload Photo
Cathédrale du Christ-Roi	Rue de la Cathedrale; Gaspé QC	48°49′48″N 64°29′13″W	Quebec (11119)		More images
Le Boutillier Manor/Manoir Le Boutillier	578 Griffon Boulevard; Gaspé QC	48°56′00″N 64°18′14″W	Federal (13303), Quebec (5032)		Upload Photo
Hyman House and Store	Grande-Grave; Forillon National Park QC	48°52′00″N 64°20′22″W	Federal (2900)		
Hyman Warehouse	Gaspé QC	48°52′00″N 64°20′22″W	Federal (2901)		
Elias Gavey, House	Gaspé QC	48°52′00″N 64°20′22″W	Federal (2902)		Upload Photo
Bartlett Phillip (Charles), House	Gaspé QC	48°52′00″N 64°20′22″W	Federal (2903)		Upload Photo
Daniel Gavey, House	Gaspé QC	48°52′00″N 64°20′22″W	Federal (2904)		Upload Photo
Joseph Gavey House	Gaspé QC	48°52′00″N 64°20′22″W	Federal (2905)		Upload Photo
Xavier Blanchette House	Gaspé QC	48°52′00″N 64°20′22″W	Federal (2906)		More images
Xavier Blanchette Storage	Gaspé QC	48°52′00″N 64°20′22″W	Federal (2907)		
Xavier Blanchette Barn	Forillon National Park QC	48°52′00″N 64°20′22″W	Federal (2919)		More images
Alfred W. Dolbel House	Forillon National Park QC	48°52′00″N 64°20′22″W	Federal (2920)		Upload Photo
St. Peter's Anglican Church	Gaspé QC	48°48′22″N 64°15′11″W	Federal (10993)		Upload Photo
Percival Gerald Hyman House	26 York Street; Gaspé QC	48°48′50″N 64°29′36″W	Federal (11014)		Upload Photo
Lighttower	Tip of Cape Forillon; Cape Forillon National Park of Canada QC	48°45′04″N 64°09′45″W	Federal (11274)		
Lighthouse	Tip of Cap d'Espoir; Percé QC	48°25′11″N 64°19′03″W	Federal (11182)		
Église de Saint-Laurent	Rue du Carillon; Matapédia QC	47°58′28″N 66°57′12″W	Matapédia municipality (15404)		
VIA Rail/Canadian National Railways Station	10 Macdonell Road; Matapédia QC	47°58′30″N 66°56′22″W	Federal (4618)		
VIA Rail/Canadian National Railways Station	6 Rue de Vimy; New Carlisle QC	48°00′26″N 65°19′25″W	Federal (4619)		
Canadian National Railways/VIA Rail Station	490 Highway 132; Port-Daniel QC	48°10′43″N 64°58′19″W	Federal (4616)		
Battle of the Restigouche National Historic Site of Canada	Route 132; Pointe-a-la-Croix QC	48°00′50″N 66°44′07″W	Federal (17341)		
Lighthouse	Cap-de-la-Madeleine QC	49°15′03″N 65°19′31″W	Federal (10444, (21002)		
Lighthouse	La Martre QC	49°12′22″N 66°10′18″W	Federal (4697)		
