= Port-Daniel station =

Railway station in Quebec, Canada

Port-Daniel
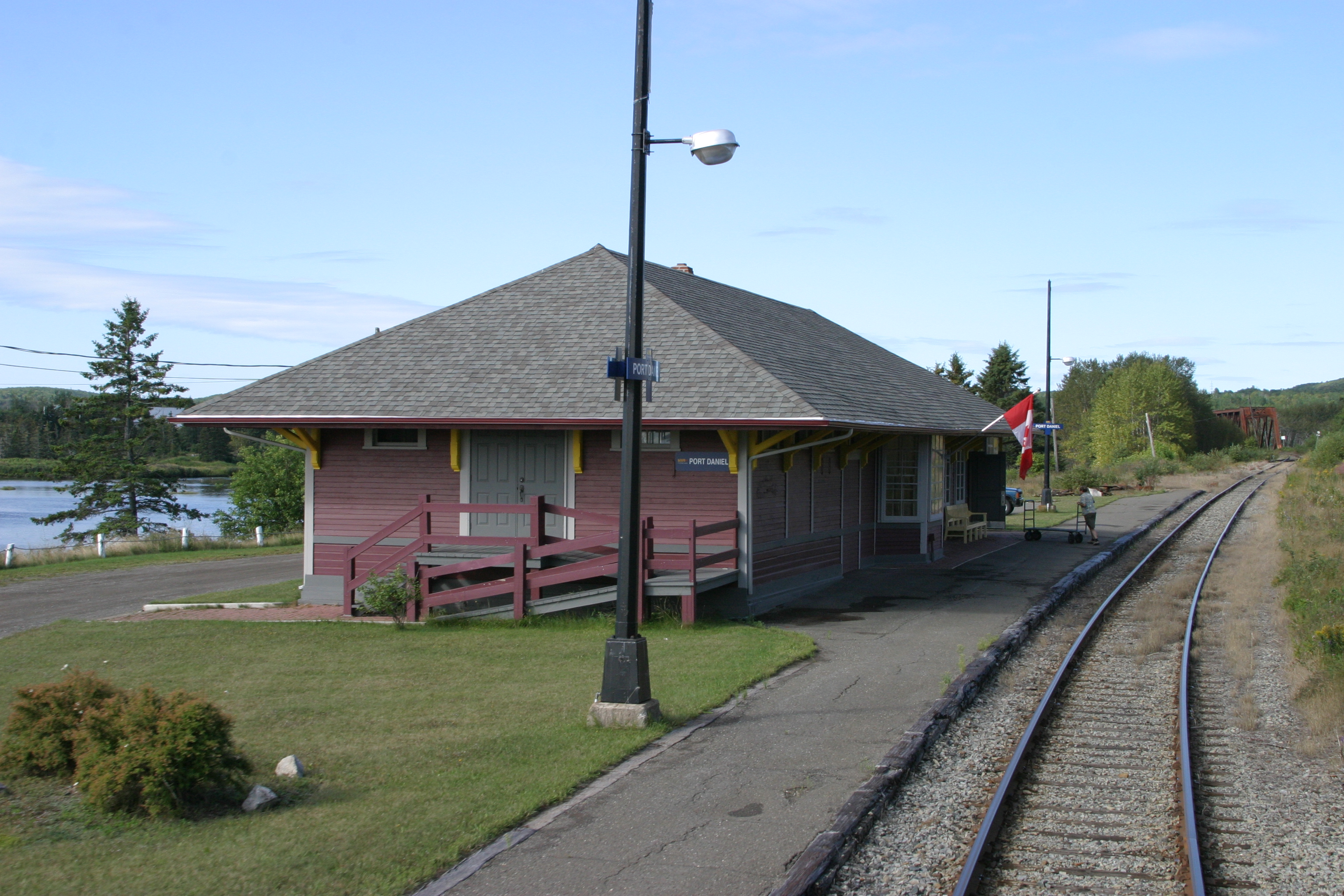

General information
- Location: 490 Route 132; Port-Daniel–Gascons, Quebec; Canada
- Coordinates: 48°10′43″N 64°58′19″W
- Owner: VIA Rail
- Platforms: 1
- Tracks: 1

Construction
- Structure type: Historic station building

Other information
- Website: Port Daniel train station

History
- Opened: 1908
- Closed: 2013

Former services
Preceding station	Via Rail	Following station
New Carlisle toward Montreal	Montreal–Gaspé (Suspended 2013-2027)	Chandler toward Gaspé
Preceding station	Canadian National Railway	Following station
Marcil toward Matapédia	Matapédia – Gaspé	Gascons toward Gaspé

Heritage Railway Station (Canada)
- Designated: 1995
- Reference no.: 4616
Location

The Port-Daniel station is an inactive railway station built in 1908 by Quebec Atlantic Oriental Railway. The railway line and service was acquired by CN Rail. CN retained the tracks until 1998, but Via Rail took over passenger service from 1977 to 2013.

The station is located on Route 132 in Port-Daniel–Gascons, Quebec, Canada. It was formerly staffed by VIA Rail but it is currently closed; Via lists the station as a "sign post". As of 2013, the Gaspé train is not running; the closest passenger rail service is provided at the Matapédia station. However, service to Gaspé is scheduled to resume in 2027.

The station was given protected status in 1995.
