= Société de chemin de fer de la Gaspésie =

Gaspésie Railway Society - Société du chemin de fer de la Gaspésie

Overview
- Headquarters: New Richmond
- Reporting mark: SFG
- Locale: eastern Quebec
- Dates of operation: 2007–
- Predecessor: Corporation du chemin de fer de la Gaspésie (C.C.F.G.) inc.

Technical
- Track gauge: 4 ft 8 1/2 in (1,435 mm) standard gauge

Other
- Website: www.scfgaspesie.com

The Société du chemin de fer de la Gaspésie (reporting mark SFG) (in English, the Gaspésie Railway Society) is a Canadian short line railway located in eastern Quebec operating 202.2 mi (325.4 km) of track from its interchange with Canadian National Railway (CN) at Matapédia in the west to the end of the line at Gaspé in the east, along the south coast of the Gaspé Peninsula.

== Ownership ==
SFG is a non-profit company owned by the following four regional county municipalities (MRCs) which the rail line serves:

- Avignon Regional County Municipality
- Bonaventure Regional County Municipality
- Le Rocher-Percé Regional County Municipality
- La Côte-de-Gaspé Regional County Municipality

In May 2015, the Gaspesie railway infrastructure was purchased by the Government of Quebec. SFG continues to offer freight service on the line, with customers located in Nouvelle and New Richmond. SFG currently operates one regular freight train (565) which operates 5–6 days a week, interchanging woodchips and lumber with Canadian National Railway (CN) at Matapédia, which are loaded at the Temrex sawmill in Nouvelle. Other semi regular customers include L.M. Windpower (Windmill blades) and Rail GD, in New Richmond, a company who specializes in heavy diesel engine repair and rail equipment refurbishment. Ciment McInnis, located in Port Daniel, is now also a regular customer although shipments have to be trucked to New Richmond and transloaded into railcars due to pending track and infrastructure repair.

== Origins ==
The railway which runs along the Gaspé Peninsula was originally constructed under two holding companies, the Quebec Oriental Railway, which owned the line between Matapédia and New Carlisle, and the Quebec, Atlantic and Western Railroad which owned the line from New Carlisle to Gaspé. In 1918, ownership of the line was transferred to the newly formed Canadian Government Railways. The 98 miles of track between Matapédia and New Carlisle became known as the Cascapedia Subdivision whereas the 104.2 miles of track between New Carlisle and Gaspé became known as the Chandler Subdivision. Ownership of the line was transferred to Canadian National Railways on 6 June 1919.

New Carlisle remains the division point between the two subdivisions and historically housed the majority of the crew base for the entire line. As such a seven track yard was constructed there, as well as a wye for turning trains and once contained a small locomotive and car shop. A large station was also built there in 1948 with an upstairs level built to house offices for train dispatchers. The eastern terminus at Gaspé also contained a yard, small engine and car shop, a wye, bunkhouse and a large station. All that remains in Gaspé today is the station and wye. Pulp and paper mills constructed at New Richmond and Chandler provided the bulk of the traffic for the line with numerous other smaller businesses receiving rail service along the entire route. The copper mine and smelter at Murdochville also provided constant rail traffic for many years, with copper ore and mining supplies being hauled by rail to Sandy Beach (Gaspé) before being trucked the rest of the journey to Murdochville.

== Declining traffic - 1996 to present ==
Due to declining traffic, as well as CN's divestment in rural branchlines following privatization in 1996, the entire line was sold to the Quebec Railway Corporation (reporting mark; QRC) on 1 December 1996. The QRC established the Chemin de fer Baie des Chaleurs (Chaleur Bay Railway, reporting mark; CBC) as a holding company for the line. Operating rights were shared by the New Brunswick East Coast Railway and sister company Chemin de fer de la Matapédia et du Golfe.

1998 brought the closure of the Noranda Copper Mine in Murdochville. The company continued to operate the smelter at a loss until 2002, hauling in ore concentrate by rail to Sandy Beach and exporting refined copper ingots. In 2002 the Gaspésia Paper Mill in Chandler closed, effectively ending any regular freight service east of New Richmond. In 2006, the Smurfit-Stone boxboard plant in New Richmond shut down, putting an end to any regular freight service east of Nouvelle. Today, regular freight service on the line serves the Temrex sawmill in Nouvelle-Ouest and has been extended again to New Richmond as Ciment Mcinnis is now transloading cement from there.

== 1997 sale of 50 miles of the Chandler Subdivision ==
Major declines in traffic on the eastern end of the Chandler Subdivision (milepost 44.1 to 104.2) caused the CBC to divest itself of the 50 mile section of line east of Chandler. This section of line was purchased by the local MRC's to preserve the rail corridor on 16 June 1997. A holding company named the Corporation du chemin de fer de la Gaspésie was formed to own this section of track, with operating rights subcontracted onto the NBEC and CFMG railways.

== 2007 ==
In 2007, the holding company was dissolved and a new one was created, the Société de chemin de fer de la Gaspésie, by a private bill of the Quebec Legislative Assembly.

== 2007 purchase of CBC ==
In 2007, QRC sold the remainder of its subsidiary Chemin de fer Baie des Chaleurs and the associated rail line from Matapédia to Chandler to the Société de chemin de fer de la Gaspésie.

The only exception to SFG owning the entire line to the junction at Matapédia was that the wye in Matapédia and 1 mi (1.6 km) of the Cascapedia Subdivision east of the wye were retained by Quebec Railway Corporation. These tracks were transferred to the Chemin de fer de la Matapédia et du Golfe.

== 2008 sale of the Quebec Railway Corporation ==
On 3 November 2008 CN announced that it was purchasing the QRC, including the New Brunswick East Coast Railway and Chemin de fer de la Matapédia et du Golfe, for $49.8 million (CAD).

As a result of this purchase, CN became the SFG's direct interchange partner at Matapédia.

SFG sub-contracts track and signal maintenance as well as rail dispatch service to RailTerm.

== 2009 Infrastructure Program ==
In 2009 the SFG and its owners, the four MRCs, reached an agreement with the Government of Canada and Government of Quebec for several million dollars in funding for infrastructure improvements on the railway line between Matapédia and Gaspé.

This funding was targeted at improving track and bridge infrastructure to allow SFG to carry heavier freight railway cars and to improve track speed for passenger trains.

In winter 2012 the rail line was closed after inspections revealed that several bridges required additional work and SCFG and the municipalities requested an additional $95 million over five years from the provincial and federal governments to complete the upgrades necessary to maintain track speed and freight car loading weight. On May 14, 2012 SCFG reopened the Cascapedia Subdivision of the Gaspé line, which runs from Matapédia to New Carlisle, after 5 months of work. The section between New Carlisle and New Richmond was later taken out of service again due to needed bridge repairs. As of April 2018, the Chandler Subdivision, which composes the eastern half of the line from New Carlisle to Gaspé, was still closed for repairs as well.

== Passenger service on the Gaspe Railway ==
Passenger service had been provided by CN using a mix of conventional passenger train as well as rail diesel cars, locally known as "Sputnik" cars as CN 118/119, known as "The Chaleur", which ran daily until the creation of Via Rail in 1978. Initially, Via Rail was running a mix of ex-CN coaches hauled by leased CN-RS-18's as VIA 118/119. In 1980 Via Rail cancelled 118/119 and replaced it with Via Rail 621/622, consisting of two rail diesel cars running daily. On 29 May 1983 Via Rail replaced 621/622 with a full trainset, now operating under Via Rail 16/17 running daily. On 15 January 1990 Via Rail cut the passenger rail service from seven days a week to three. The train was known as the passenger service or "The Chaleur".

== Suspension of VIA Rail service ==
In December 2011, an inspection of several of the bridges on the rail line revealed serious structural problems with the bridge over the Grande Pabos River in Chandler. As a result, the last VIA Rail passenger train went to Gaspé on Saturday, December 10, 2011. On 22 December 2011 the twin bridges over the Grande Cascapedia River were embargoed until repairs were completed. The passenger service was temporarily replaced by buses. A full train set would return in 2012 as far as New Carlisle after repairs to the Grand Cascapedia bridges were completed. Due to further issues on the Chandler Subdivision, including a washout just east of the tunnel at Port Daniel, as well as structural flaws in the Haldimand Bridge near Douglastown, VIA again returned to a bus service on 13 August 2013. On 17 September 2013, the last bus traveled to Gaspé when VIA cancelled its services on the Gaspé Peninsula until further notice. The future of passenger service on the Gaspé coast remains uncertain.

== 2015 sale of the SFG ==
During the winter of 2015, SFG encountered financial difficulties due to declining revenues and went into receivership. The entire line and all of SFG's assets were put up for sale by April. In May, the provincial government of Quebec purchased the railway line and oversees all maintenance on the line under MTQ (Quebec ministry of transport). All other assets were retained by SFG after Quebec purchased the rail line and still take care of railway operations and light maintenance work under contract for the Province of Quebec.

For the short term, the section of the Cascapedia Subdivision between Matapédia and New Richmond is maintained and upgraded to ensure regular freight service. The section of the Chandler Subdivision between Percé and Gaspé, will be maintained and upgraded for use by L'Amiral Tourist Train. This work was not completed as of 2017. The central section between New Richmond and Percé requires major bridge repairs. A washout near mile 25 just east of the tunnel at Port Daniel during the summer of 2015 renders passage east of mile 25 impossible until repairs can be made.

== Equipment roster ==
SFG owns six 1800 hp RS-18u locomotives, numbered 1819, 1821, 1849, 1856, 1865 and 1868. They were originally built by the Montreal Locomotive Works in 1957-1958 and transferred to the Quebec Railway Corporation in 1998. 1819, 1849 and 1856 were purchased from the New Brunswick East Coast Railway and 1865 was purchased from the Ottawa Central Railway. 1821 and 1868 were purchased from the Charlevoix Railway who in turn had purchased them from the New Brunswick East Coast Railway.

SFG also owns several pieces of maintenance equipment, including several flat cars, Difco side dump cars, Hart ballast hoppers, two snow plows, and three Pyle regulator type snow plows. All of their maintenance equipment was originally owned by CN and came from the New Brunswick East Coast Railway, Chemin de fer de la Matapédia et du Golfe and the Chemin de fer Baie des Chaleurs. The railway also owns a small number of ex-AMT, nee-GO single level coaches as well as two ex-AMT, nee-CN steam generator cars converted for use as HEP generators.

== L'Amiral tourist train ==
In July 2013, the SCFG inaugurated a tourist train called L'Amiral along portions of the line. During the 2014 tourist season, the train ran between Percé (L'Anse-à-Beaufils; Coin-du-Banc) and Gaspé. Service was suspended in 2015 for track repairs and has not yet been reinstated.

The tourist train consists of two ex-AMT, nee-CN steam generator cars converted for use as HEP generator cars, three ex-AMT, nee-GO RTC-85 single level coaches, all painted for the tourist train. RS-18u 1849 was also retrofitted and painted for use with the tourist train.
