= Quebec Atlantic Oriental Railway =

Map

The Quebec Oriental Railway was the name for a railway running along the southern shore of the Gaspé Peninsula, Quebec, Canada, opened in 1907 from Matapédia to (eventually) Gaspé, Quebec. The railway is currently owned by the Canadian National Railway, while Via Rail plans on reintroducing its Montreal–Gaspé train service in 2027.

== History ==
The line of the Quebec Oriental began as an endeavour of the Atlantic and Lake Superior Railway, envisioned as a line from Gaspé to the Great Lakes. The project didn't get far, and only constructed a line from Matapédia to Caplan in the 1890s. The Quebec Oriental was chartered to extend the line to New Carlisle, and the Atlantic, Quebec and Western Railway extended it further to Gaspé. The line was then fully taken over by Canadian National in 1923.

The tracks this train operated on have changed ownership several times in recent years. Until 1998, the tracks from Montreal to Gaspé were owned by Canadian National Railway (CN). That year, CN sold the lines between Rivière-du-Loup and Matapédia, as well as Matapédia to Gaspé to Quebec Railway Corporation which established two subsidiary companies, the Chemin de fer de la Matapédia et du Golfe (Matapedia and Gulf Railway) and Chemin de fer Baie des Chaleurs (Chaleur Bay Railway) respectively.

In 2001, CFBC sold the portion of the Matapédia to Gaspé line east of Chandler to Chemin de fer de la Gaspésie (Gaspé Railway) which is owned by local municipalities with maintenance contracted to CFBC.

In 2007, CFG purchased the remainder of the line from Matapédia to Chandler after the CFBC listed it for abandonment.

In 2008, CN purchased the CFMG line from Rivière-du-Loup to Matapédia, returning to ownership of this line after QRC encountered financial difficulty.
