= Nouvelle station =

Railway station in Quebec, Canada

Nouvelle

General information
- Location: Rue de la Gare, Nouvelle, Quebec; Canada
- Coordinates: 48.1364°N 66.3102°W
- Tracks: 1

Construction
- Structure type: Shingle style

Other information
- Website: Nouvelle

Former services
Preceding station	Via Rail	Following station
Matapédia toward Montreal	Montreal–Gaspé (Suspended 2013-2027)	Carleton toward Gaspé
Preceding station	Canadian National Railway	Following station
Nouvelle West toward Matapédia	Matapédia – Gaspé	St. Omer toward Gaspé
Location

The Nouvelle station was a railway station in Nouvelle, Quebec, Canada. It was formerly a Via Rail flag stop serving the Montreal-Gaspé train, but passenger service east of Matapédia station was suspended in 2013. It was served by the Montreal–Gaspé train three days a week in each direction towards Montreal or Gaspé. There are plans to revive the service in 2027.

The station, which handled both freight and passenger traffic, is a wooden framed shingle building. It is on the corner of Maguire Street and Station Street (Rue Maguire and Rue de la Gare). Nearby attractions include the Miguasha National Park.
