= New Carlisle station (Quebec) =

Railway station in Quebec, Canada

New Carlisle
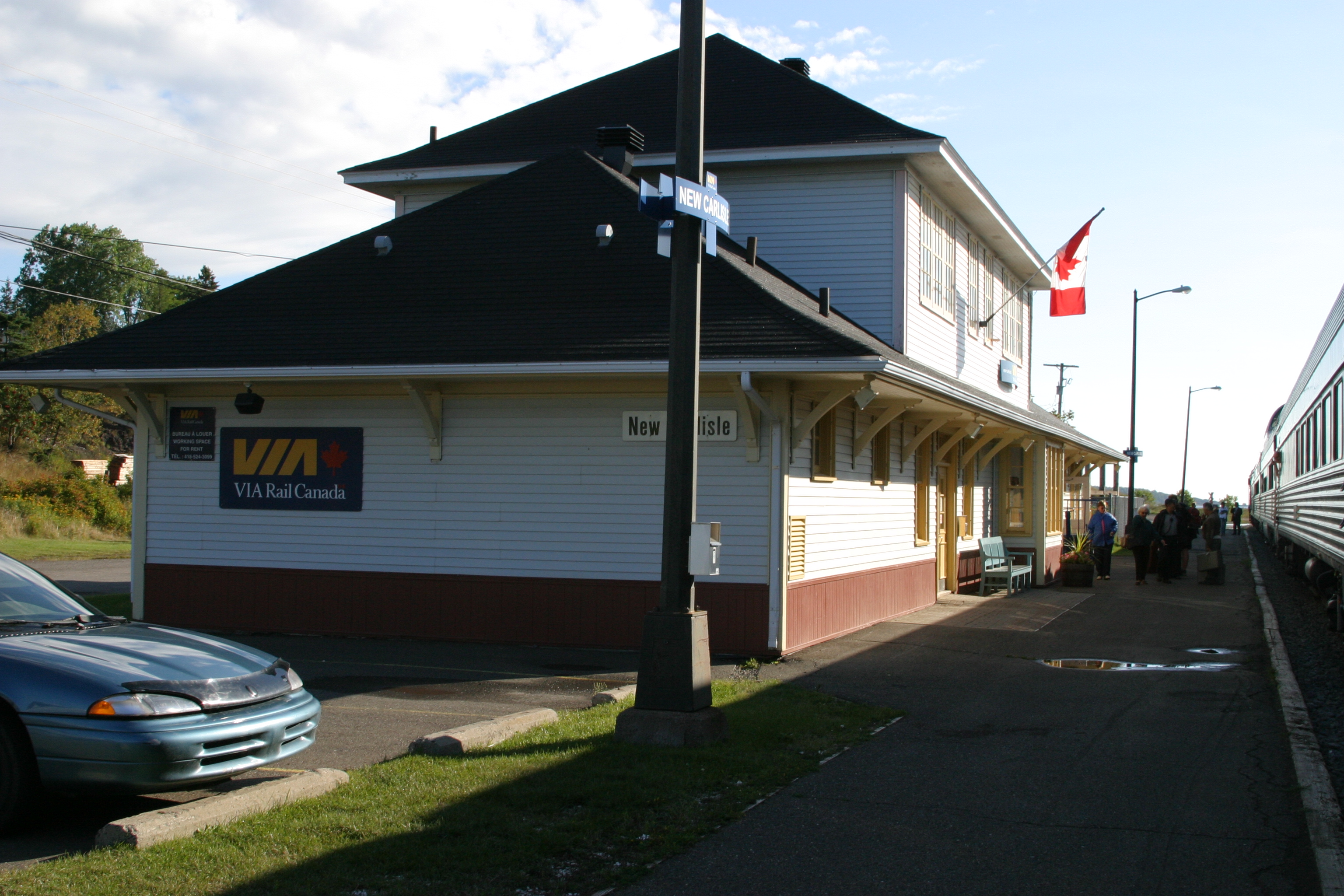

General information
- Location: 6 rue Vimy; New Carlisle, Quebec; Canada
- Coordinates: 48.007°N 65.323°W
- Tracks: 3 plus 2 wyes

Other information
- Website: New Carlisle train station

History
- Opened: 1947
- Closed: 2013

Former services
Preceding station	Via Rail	Following station
Bonaventure toward Montreal	Montreal–Gaspé (Suspended 2013-2027)	Port-Daniel toward Gaspé
Preceding station	Canadian National Railway	Following station
Bonaventure toward Matapédia	Matapédia – Gaspé	Paspebiac toward Gaspé

Heritage Railway Station (Canada)
- Designated: 1994
Location

The New Carlisle station is a closed railway station in New Carlisle, Quebec, Canada. It served the Montreal-Gaspé train until service was suspended east of Matapédia station in 2013 due to deteriorating track conditions. However, service to Gaspé is scheduled to resume in 2027.

== Heritage Information ==
The station is a designated Heritage Railway Station, so protected since 1994. The station was built by the Canadian National Railways in 1947. The imposing, two-storey structure was built according to a 1920s plan "for Québec stations, in which the upper floor accommodates the administrative functions of a divisional point station, in addition to the station agent’s residence." The current station was built to replace a former building, destroyed by fire.

On November 9, 1942, German spy Werner von Janowski came ashore from German submarine U-518 in Chaleur Bay, four miles to the west of town. He boarded a train in the New Carlisle station which the present one replaced. He intended to travel to Montreal, but was captured almost immediately after boarding.
