= Werner von Janowski =

German Nazi spy

Werner Alfred Waldemar von Janowski
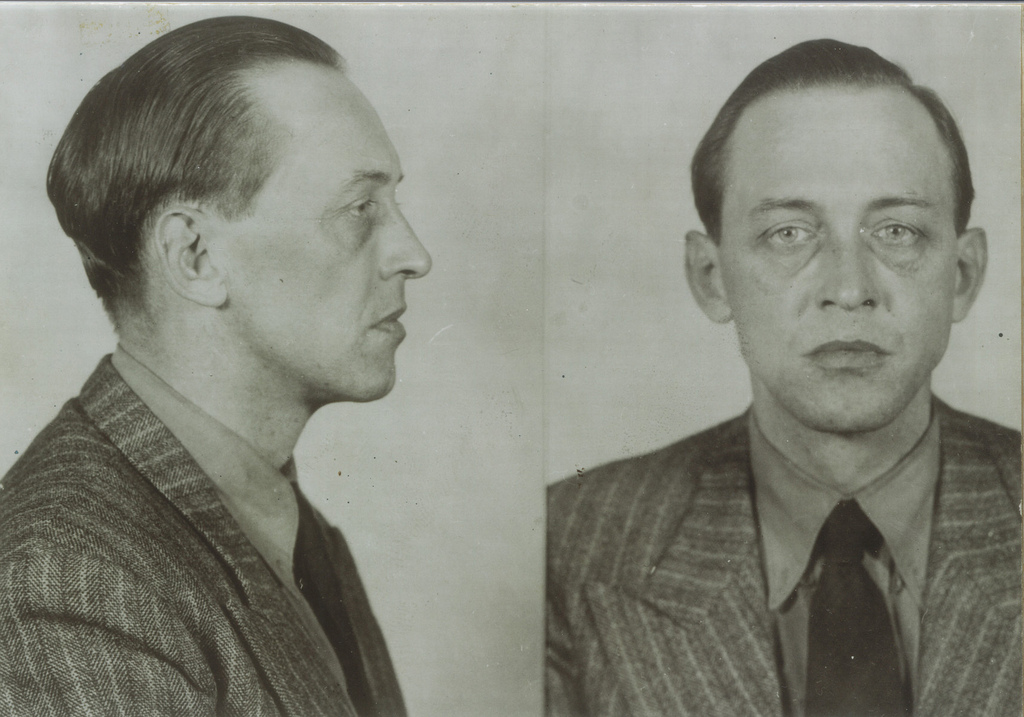
- RCMP mugshot of Janowski
- Born: ca 1903/1904; Allenstein, East Prussia
- Died: 22 February 1978; Benissa, Alicante, Spain
- Occupation: Spy
- Espionage activity
- Codename: WATCHDOG
- Codename: Bobbi
- Operations: WATCHDOG

Werner Alfred Waldemar von Janowski, (Abwehr-codenamed "Bobbi"; Allied-codenamed WATCHDOG), was a German Second World War Nazi spy and the Royal Canadian Mounted Police's first double agent. He was landed by submarine at New Carlisle, Quebec on 9 November 1942 but quickly captured.

== Mission ==
Janowski was trained in espionage and sabotage by Nazi Germany's Abwehr agency and sent to Canada to operate in Montreal. He successfully disembarked from the German submarine U-518 submarine at Chaleur Bay, four miles (6.4 km) west of New Carlisle, Quebec, around 5 a.m., on 9 November 1942. Janowski tried to leave New Carlisle on the first available train after a quick rest and clean-up in a local hotel.

== Capture ==
At 6:30 a.m., under the alias of William Brenton, Janowski checked in at Hotel New Carlisle asking for a room with a bath. The son of the hotel owner, Earle Annett Jr., grew suspicious of him, due to inconsistencies with the German spy's story. The man said he took the bus that morning before walking to the hotel, but the bus was not going through New Carlisle that day, and even if it had, it would have dropped him off at the hotel. Annett also noticed that he spoke English with a Parisian accent, his clothing had European styling, and that he paid for his cigarettes with an obsolete Canadian dollar bill that had not been in circulation for quite some time. The stranger also had a strange smell on him; he was using Belgian matches that did not carry the Canadian government seal that was applied to matchbooks at the time. Less than three hours after his arrival and before Annett could confirm his suspicions, the stranger paid his bill and made his way to the New Carlisle train station where he had a coffee while waiting for the next train.

Annett followed him to the station, sat down beside him, and offered some cigarettes. Von Janowski lit the cigarette using the same Belgian matches he had at the hotel. Annett grew even more suspicious and alerted Constable Alfonse Duchesneau of the Sûreté du Québec. Duchesneau boarded the Canadian National Railway passenger train behind Janowski just as it left New Carlisle for Matapedia where the spy planned to catch a connecting train to Montreal. Duchesneau intercepted Janowski, who maintained he was William Brenton, a radio salesman from Toronto. He stuck with this story until the policeman asked to search his bags; Janowski immediately said to Duchesneau, "Searching my luggage won't be necessary. I am a German officer who serves his country as you serve yours." Inspection of von Janowski's personal effects upon his arrest revealed that he was carrying a powerful radio transmitter, among other things.

After his capture and interrogation, the Canadian military attempted to locate the German submarine in which Janowski had arrived. Despite an extensive search of Chaleur Bay, both the warship HMCS Burlington and assisting Royal Canadian Air Force aircraft were unable to locate U-518.

== After capture ==
Janowski offered to co-operate with Canadian authorities and the RCMP attempted to use him as a double agent under the code name "Watchdog". Due to the RCMP's inexperience with double agents and problems in operating with British intelligence agencies, Operation Watchdog was a failure. Janowski provided little significant intelligence to the Allies, although the Canadian experience of running a double agent prepared the RCMP with experience to better manage Igor Gouzenko, the Soviet spy who defected to them three years later. Within a year operation Watchdog was shut down. One author has speculated that Janowski may have been a triple agent and a German attempt to expose other Allied double agents but no evidence has emerged to support this idea. After Operation Watchdog was discontinued, Janowski was sent to England in late August 1943 where he was incarcerated at Camp 020. He remained there for the duration of the war. He was repatriated to an internment camp in the British Zone of Germany in July 1945.

== Later life ==
Released in 1947, Janowski had no home to return to, as Allenstein and most of East Prussia had become part of Poland, owing to Joseph Stalin's redrawing of Poland's borders; most of the German population was expelled. He eventually found work as a translator, and in the 1960s worked for the German Navy. Janowski died in Spain in 1978 while on a holiday.
