= Chemin de fer Baie des Chaleurs =

1996–2007 short line railway in eastern Quebec

Overview
- Headquarters: New Richmond
- Reporting mark: CBC
- Locale: eastern Quebec
- Dates of operation: 1998–2007
- Predecessor: Canadian National Railway Cascapedia and Chandler Subdivisions
- Successor: Société de chemin de fer de la Gaspésie

Technical
- Track gauge: 4 ft 8 1/2 in (1,435 mm) standard gauge

The Chemin de fer Baie des Chaleurs (reporting mark CBC) (in English, the Chaleur Bay Railway) was a short line railway that operated in eastern Québec from 1996 to 2007.

Owned by the holding company Quebec Railway Corporation (QRC), CBC operated freight service between Matapédia in the west to Chandler and later Gaspé in the east.

== 1996 establishment ==
The Chemin de fer Baie des Chaleurs was established on 1 December 1996 as a subsidiary of QRC to operate the former Canadian National Railway (CN) Cascapedia Subdivision between Matapédia and New Carlisle as well as the western half of the Chandler Subdivision between New Carlisle and Chandler.

This transaction did not include the eastern half of the Chandler Subdivision between Chandler and Gaspé, however, this track was purchased on 16 June 1997 from CN by a non-profit corporation owned by local municipalities called Société de chemin de fer de la Gaspésie (SCFG). Operation of the eastern half of the Chandler Subdivision was then sub-contracted by SCFG to CBC, creating a seamless 202 miles (325 km) line between Matapédia in the west and Gaspé in the east.

== 2007 sale to SCFG ==
In 2007 QRC sold the remainder of CBC's Matapédia to Chandler line to the SCFG which was owned by local municipalities. The SCFG track ownership begins 1 mi (1.6 km) east of the wye in Matapédia. This small connecting section remained in QRC ownership and was transferred to its subsidiary Chemin de fer de la Matapédia et du Golfe (CFMG). CFMG was sub-contracted to provide freight service for SCFG.

In November 2008 CFMG was sold to CN.
