= Montreal–Gaspé train =

Suspended passenger train operated by Via Rail between Montreal and Gaspé, Quebec

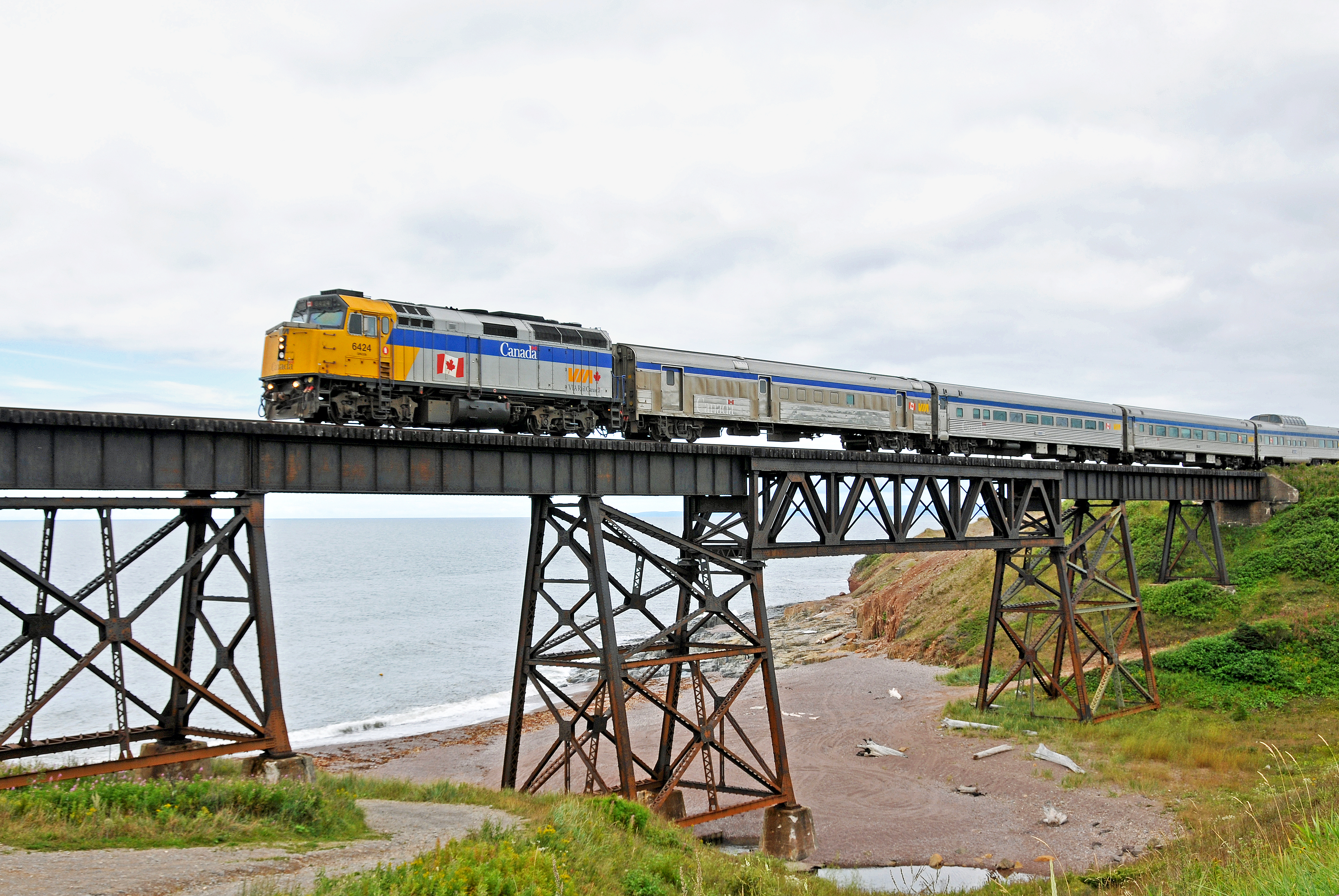
- The Chaleur crosses a bridge at Grande-Rivière, Quebec, in 2010.

Overview
- Service type: Inter-city rail
- Status: Suspended; to be restored to New Carlisle in 2028
- Locale: Quebec, Canada
- Current operator: Via Rail
- Former operator: Canadian National Railway
- Ridership: 24,000 (2007); 29,500 (2008)

Route
- Termini: Montreal, Quebec; Gaspé, Quebec
- Distance travelled: 1,041 km (647 mi)
- Service frequency: 3 trains per week
- Train number: 16, 17

On-board services
- Classes: Standard and sleeper class
- Seating arrangements: Reserved coach seat
- Catering facilities: Dining car

Technical
- Rolling stock: Pre-2013: GMD F40PH-2D locomotives, streamlined HEP cars
- Track gauge: 1,435 mm (4 ft 8 1/2 in)
- Track owners: CN; QRC; CFG

The Montreal–Gaspé train (formerly the Chaleur) was a thrice-weekly passenger train operated by Via Rail between Montreal and Gaspé, Quebec. As of November 2026, Via Rail plans on restoring service as far as New Carlisle station in 2028, with full service to Gaspé coming at a later date.

== History ==
In 1907 the Quebec Atlantic Oriental Railway was built from Matapédia through New Carlisle to Port Daniel, and gradually extended until it reached Gaspé. Before that, inhabitants had to drive by horse or sleigh 180 miles (290 km) to catch the Intercolonial Railway from Matapédia to Montreal, a journey of four days.

== Schedule ==
The train left Montreal in the evening and arrived in Gaspé at about noon the following day. The train departed Gaspé mid-afternoon and arrived in Montreal in the morning.

== Operation ==
In later years the train was normally merged with the Ocean between Montreal and Matapédia. The Montreal–Gaspé train after 1995 was composed exclusively of cars built by the Budd Company, many originally used by the Canadian Pacific Railway's Canadian.

This had been the case until 2004 for the Ocean as well, but the introduction of the Renaissance cars on the Ocean resulted in both trains operating separately during the summer months (when trains were longer) and combined during the winter; the reason for this policy appears to be related to the braking effort of a combined train.

When operating separately, the Montreal–Gaspé train ran several minutes ahead of the Ocean. When combined, the trains ran together as far as Matapédia, before the Ocean continued to Halifax, Nova Scotia, and the Montreal–Gaspé train proceeded to Gaspé.

=== Suspension of service ===
Service east of Matapédia, Quebec, was suspended by Via Rail in December 2011, owing to poor track and bridge conditions between Matapédia and Gaspé. In winter/spring 2012 some repair work was carried out on the track and on one of the bridges passing over the Cascapédia River. Via Rail service was restored between Matapédia and New Carlisle in May 2012.

In August 2013, VIA Rail service once again was suspended between Matapédia and New Carlisle owing to poor track and bridge conditions. Replacement buses between Matapédia and Gaspé operated until 17 September 2013, after which the bus service was withdrawn.

On 22 August 2013, Via Rail announced that as a result of Société de chemin de fer de la Gaspésie (SCFG)'s rail infrastructure problems (including rail corrosion and malfunctioning crossing signals), service between Matapédia and Gaspé would be suspended. Service resumed about a month later as buses were used to transport passengers until the track upgrades were completed. As of 17 September 2013, both rail and bus service in the affected portion were suspended, and no timeline for re-establishment was released.

== Restoration of service ==
In 2020, repair work was finally underway and the rail section from Matapédia to Port Daniel was expected to be operational in late 2023. Via Rail said, however, they wished to wait until the whole line was repaired before resuming service.

On June 27, 2023, the Government of Quebec announced that service to Gaspé would be restored in 2026 after the completion of a multi-year $872 million project to completely rehabilitate the Gaspé railway.

The Gaspé railway rehabilitation project was divided into three sections: Matapédia to Caplan (which is complete), Caplan to Port-Daniel-Gascons (which is now under construction and will be completed in 2024), and Port-Daniel-Gascons to Gaspé (which will begin in 2023 with riprap work along the line).

Although Via originally planned to restore service only once the full line to Gaspé was rehabilitated, in November 2026, Via decided to pursue a "phased return to service", thereby allowing for service to New Carlisle to return in spring 2028. This would half the amount of time needed for Gaspé residents to drive to a Via station, which is especially important due to the rough condition of the roads and the fact that many seniors who need access to medical care do not have cars. Full restoration of service to Gaspé would require the support of the Government of Quebec. Quebec transport minister Nicolas Girard said that there were no updates on this, though the Ministry of Transport of Quebec said that it "continues to work with Via Rail with the aim of a resumption of passenger service".

== Route ==
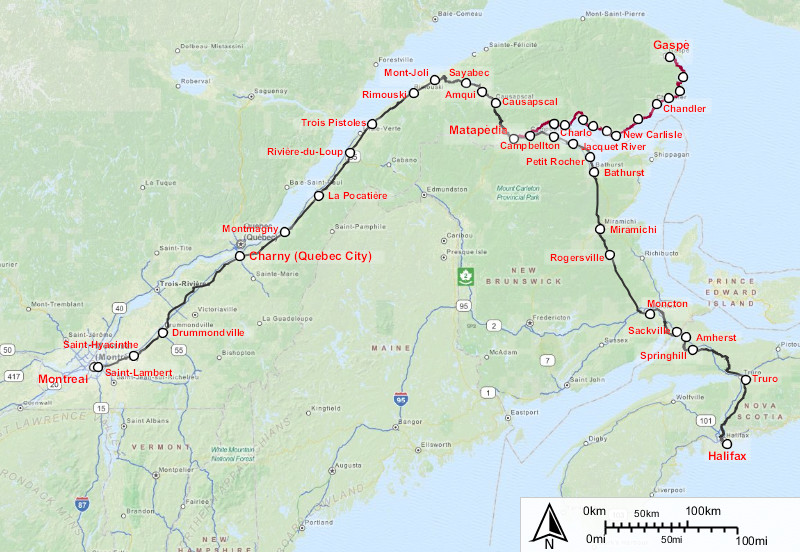
Train route (in brown)

The tracks this train operated on have changed ownership several times. Until 1998, the tracks from Montreal to Gaspé were owned by Canadian National Railway (CN). That year, CN sold the lines between Rivière-du-Loup and Matapédia, as well as Matapédia to Gaspé, to Quebec Railway Corporation, which established two subsidiary companies, the Chemin de fer de la Matapédia et du Golfe (Matapédia & Gulf Railway) and Chemin de fer Baie des Chaleurs (Chaleur Bay Railway) respectively. In 2001, CFBC sold the portion of the Matapédia-to-Gaspé line east of Chandler to Chemin de fer de la Gaspésie (Gaspé Railway), which was owned by local municipalities with maintenance contracted to CFBC. In 2007, CFG purchased the remainder of the line from Matapédia to Chandler after the CFBC listed it for abandonment. In 2008, CN purchased the CFMG line from Rivière-du-Loup to Matapédia, returning ownership of this line after QRC encountered financial difficulty.
