= Maison Busteed =

House in Quebec built circa 1800

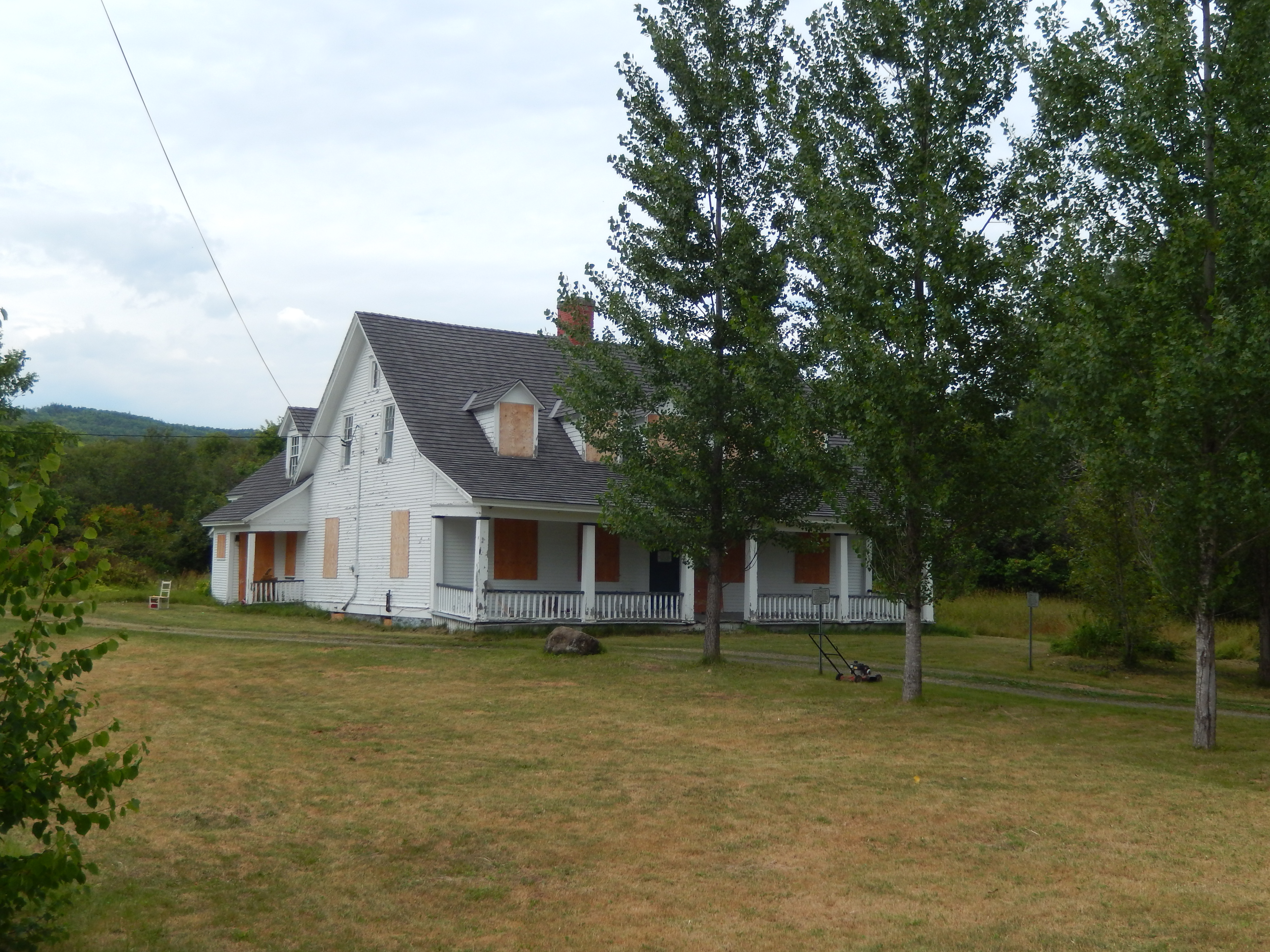
- Interactive map of Maison Busteed
- 48°0′41.652″N 66°44′17.232″W
- Location: Quebec, Canada
- Nearest city: Pointe-à-la-Croix

History
- Built: c. 1800

Patrimoine culturel du Québec
- Designated: October 9, 1987
- Reference no.: 92519 (in French)
- Designated by: Ministry of Culture and Communications

National Historic Site of Canada
- Designated: December 6, 2007
- Delisted: 2012

Maison Busteed (French for 'Busteed House'), a.k.a. Bordeaux House, was a house in Quebec, the oldest within the geographical boundaries of Gaspésie. It was situated within the unceded territories of Listuguj Miꞌgmaq First Nation on the banks of the Restigouche River. The house, wooden and built in a British style, burnt down on May 31, 2020. As of June 2020, the fire was being investigated as arson.

== Etymology ==
The house's two names refer, respectively, to the Busteed family, which occupied the house for much of the 19th and 20th centuries; and to local place names.

Thomas Busteed, Esq. immigrated from Ireland to what is now Quebec in 1786, following his brother William—a Loyalist who left America following the Revolution. Thomas built the house around 1800. He evidently grew involved in local politics: as of 1837, he was a commissioner of affidavits in the Ristigouche area; and on September 18, 1842, he petitioned the Parliament of the Province of Canada for "the establishment of certain Judicial Courts" in Gaspé.

As to "Bordeaux," a 19th-century surveyor says:

Point au Bourdo, the residence of Thomas Busteed, Esquire, about three miles above the Mission Point, was once the site of a French town called Petit Rochelle, and the shores on each side of the river were formerly occupied by French villages.

The Quebec Cultural Heritage Directory suggests that "Bordeaux" (and hence "Bourdo," "Bourdeau," and other orthographic variants) refers to Jean-François Bourdon de Dombourg, an officer who commanded a military installation on or near the property in the mid-18th century.

== History ==
The Miꞌkmaq have lived in the Gaspé Peninsula—a region colonized by France, later conquered by Britain, and now within the provincial jurisdiction of Quebec—for 5,000 years or more. By 1800, when the house was built, it was located in what was then called Lower Canada.

According to Margaret Grant MacWhirter, an early 20th-century travel writer,

Shortly after the conquest this property was occupied by a Frenchman—Jean Baptiste Marceau—but in 1784, Henry Rimphoff of Carleton came into possession, remaining till July 5th, 1800, when he sold to Thos. Busteed, Esq. (great grandfather of the present owner) and the property has remained in the family ever since.

The "conquest" to which MacWhirter alludes is the British victory in the Battle of Restigouche, a naval battle of the French and Indian War, and the British acquisition of Quebec and other French possessions that ensued shortly thereafter. Rimphoff, for his part, was a veteran of the Revolutionary War and had commanded, according to a present-day historian, a "battalion of militia in the Gaspé."

"Marceau" is likely a misspelling on MacWhirter's part. The entry on Maison Busteed maintained by the Quebec Cultural Heritage Directory states that Busteed purchased the property from Jean-Baptiste Marcoux, but due to apparent defects in the sale he had to purchase it again from Rimphoff in 1800.

At the time of MacWhirter's visit in the 1910s, "[t]he old house, recently repaired [sic] [was] a veritable museum of relics of the French period." James Le Moine, a late 19th century chronicler, concurred:

Mr. Busteed's house … contains several interesting relics of former times—substantial mementoes of the strife which in 1690 and 1758–60 raged between the navies of France and England. At the entrance of the Restigouche, Admiral Byron sunk a French frigate close to Cross Point; a few miles lower down, Percé and Bonaventure had been mercilessly pillaged in 1690. The hulls of the French vessels can yet be seen in very low tides, from one of which a massive cannon was procured some years back, and now ornaments the fireplace of Mr. Busteed’s dwelling; it was shown to us.

The property on which the house was built was thought to be near to—or coextensive with—the Acadian settlement of Petite-Rochelle, which was sacked by the British on July 2, 1760. Locals, including the Busteeds, have long maintained collections of historical artifacts dating from the period of French occupation.

== Present day ==
The house and surrounding property are located within a region, covering much of the Gaspé Peninsula, which the Mi'gmawei Mawiomi Secretariat claimed in October 2007 on behalf of several First Nations. Canada is currently negotiating this claim with the Secretariat as it pertains to territories located in Quebec (although not with regard to territory in New Brunswick). The negotiations may eventually result in a land claims agreement.

Public Services and Procurement Canada bought Maison Busteed from a member of the Busteed family in 2009. In 2015, following litigation brought by the Listuguj Miꞌgmaq First Nation, Canada entered into a separate agreement by which, among other things, it assigned Maison Busteed and the surrounding property to the Listuguj Miꞌgmaq First Nation. However, as the lands had never been assigned by the Miꞌgmaq people to Canada by treaty, it is unclear whether such an assignment was strictly required.

Given its links to colonialism, the status of the house has long been controversial. Some members of the community favoured removing the building, viewing it as a monument to colonization; while others favoured retaining for purposes of historic preservation. That debate was mooted on May 31, 2020, however, when the building burnt down after having been left in disrepair for many years. As of June 2020, the fire was being investigated as arson.

== See also ==
- Architecture of Quebec
- Architecture of Canada

== Bibliography ==
- Clarke, P. D. (1999). "À la recherche de La Petite-Rochelle: Memory and Identity in Restigouche". Acadiensis. 28 (2): 3–40. ISSN 0044-5851. JSTOR 30302691.
- MacWhirter, Margaret Grant (1919). Treasure Trove in Gaspé and the Baie des Chaleurs (3rd ed.). Quebec City: Telegraph Print Company. p. 94 – via Canadiana.
- Reid, Jennifer (1995). Myth, Symbol, and Colonial Encounter: British and Mi'kmaq in Acadia, 1700–1867. Ottawa: University of Ottawa Press. doi:10.2307/j.ctt1cn6rz3. ISBN 978-0-7766-1659-9. JSTOR j.ctt1cn6rz3.
