= Matapédia station =

Railway station in Quebec, Canada

Matapédia
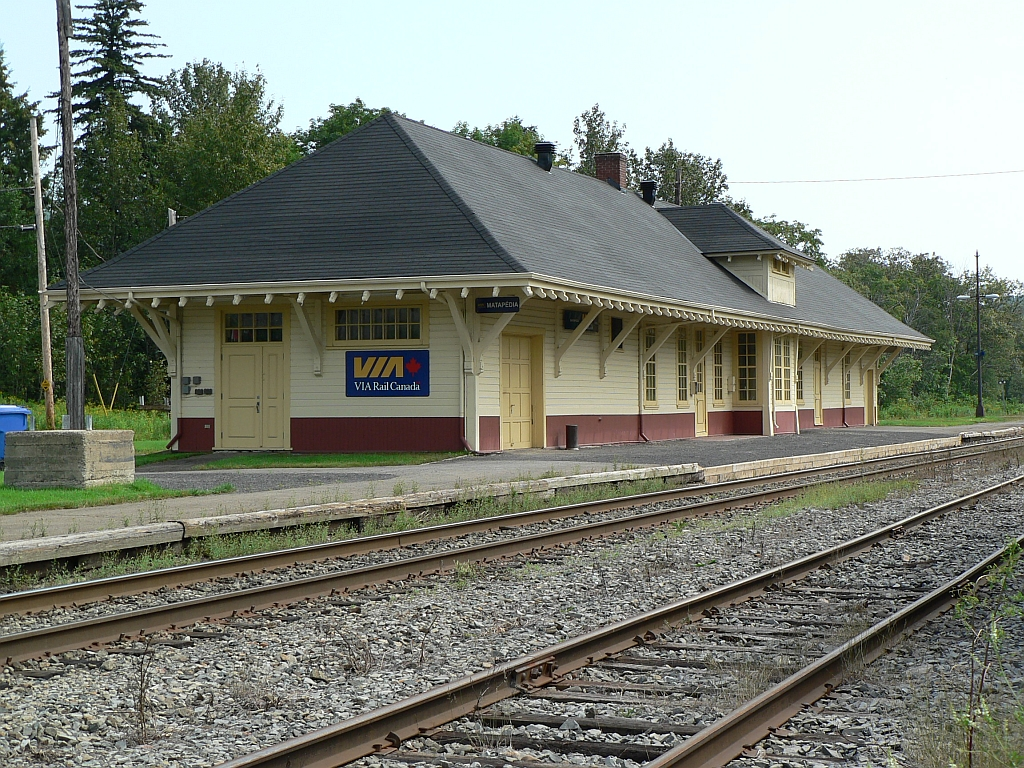

General information
- Location: 10 rue MacDonell; Matapédia, QC; Canada
- Coordinates: 47°58′29″N 66°56′22″W
- Platforms: 1 side platform
- Tracks: 2

Construction
- Structure type: Unstaffed station
- Parking: Yes
- Accessible: Yes

Services
Preceding station	Via Rail	Following station
Causapscal toward Montreal	Ocean	Campbellton toward Halifax
Former services
Preceding station	Via Rail	Following station
Causapscal toward Montreal	Montreal–Gaspé (Suspended 2013-2027)	Nouvelle toward Gaspé
Preceding station	Canadian National Railway	Following station
Champion toward Montreal	Montreal – Moncton	Flatlands toward Moncton
Terminus	Matapédia – Gaspé	Cross Point toward Gaspé
Location
- Location within Quebec Location within Canada

Matapédia station is a Via Rail station in Matapédia, Quebec, Canada. Matapédia is the junction between two rail lines. The east-west former Intercolonial Railway mainline from Halifax to Rivière-du-Loup is joined from the east by a line running along the south coast of the Gaspé Peninsula to the town of Gaspé.

As a result, Matapédia was where two Via Rail routes diverged en route to their eastern termini, whereas they converged when heading westbound. The 6 day/week Halifax-Montreal Ocean and 3 day/week Montreal – Gaspé train operated as one train between Matapédia and Montreal in the winter time when each separate train has fewer cars.

Since the 2004, introduction of Renaissance cars (the former Nightstar trains from the UK) on the Ocean both trains operated separately between Matapédia and Montreal during the summer when each train was longer.

Service to Gaspé was interrupted in 2013 and has not resumed. However, there have been recent attempts to resuscitate it, with the line to Gaspé being scheduled for reopening in 2027.

When operating separately, the Montreal – Gaspé train ran several minutes ahead of the Ocean toward Montreal. When combined, the trains ran together as far as Matapédia before the Ocean continued to Halifax, Nova Scotia and the Montreal – Gaspé train proceeded to Gaspé.

The Canadian National Railway station is a designated Heritage Railway Station, under the Heritage Railway Stations Protection Act.
