= Port-Daniel–Gascons =

- Municipality
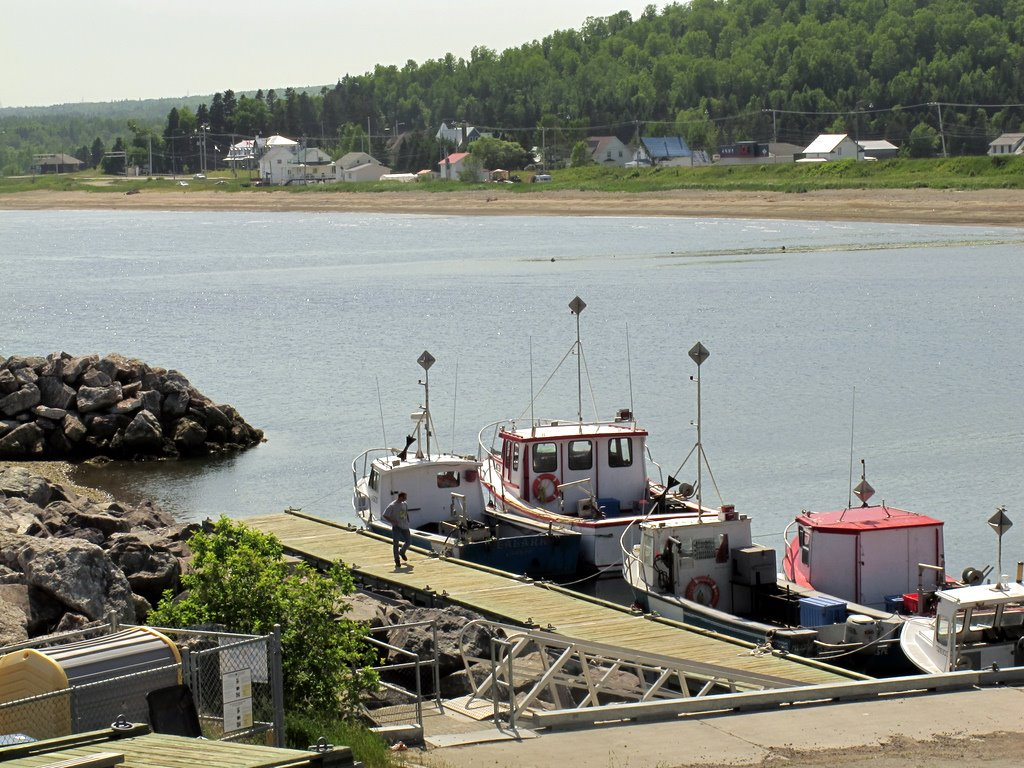
- Harbour at Port-Daniel–Gascons

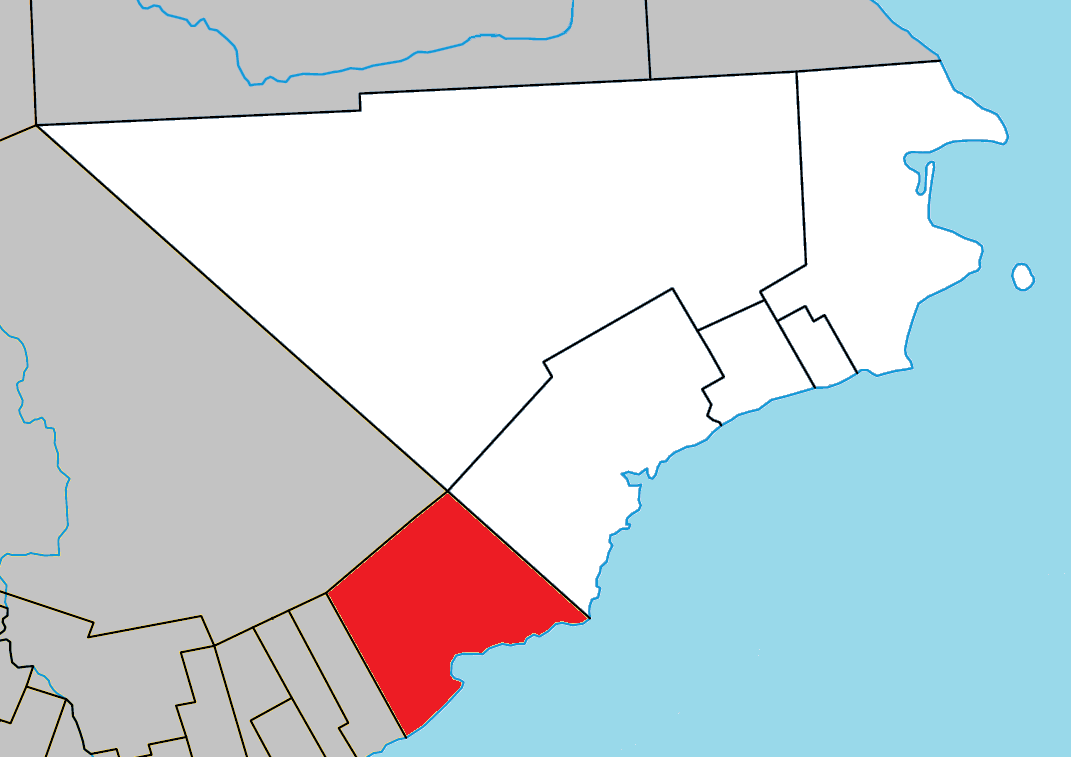
- Location within Le Rocher-Percé RCM

- Location in eastern Quebec
- Coordinates: 48°11′N 64°58′W
- Country: Canada
- Province: Quebec
- Region: Gaspésie–Îles-de-la-Madeleine
- RCM: Le Rocher-Percé
- Constituted: January 17, 2001
- Named for: Charles Daniel and Gascon people

Government
  - Mayor: Henri Grenier
  - Federal riding: Gaspésie—Les Îles-de-la-Madeleine—Listuguj
  - Prov. riding: Bonaventure

Area
  - Total: 334.78 km^{2} (129.26 sq mi)
  - Land: 300.29 km^{2} (115.94 sq mi)

Population (2021)
  - Total: 2,271
  - Density: 7.6/km^{2} (20/sq mi)
  - Pop (2016-21): ▲2.8%
  - Dwellings: 1,227
- Time zone: UTC−5 (EST)
  - Summer (DST): UTC−4 (EDT)
- Postal code(s): G0C 2N0
- Area codes: 418 and 581
- Highways: R-132
- Website: munpdg.ca

Port-Daniel–Gascons (French pronunciation: [pɔʁ danjɛl ɡaskɔ̃]) is a municipality in the Gaspésie-Îles-de-la-Madeleine region of the province of Quebec in Canada.

The municipality includes the communities of Marcil, Clemville, Port-Daniel-Ouest, Port-Daniel-Est, Gascons-Ouest, and Gascons-Est. It is bordered to the south by Chaleur Bay, to the north by the interior of the Gaspésie, to the west by Shigawake, and to the east by Chandler (Newport District).

== History ==
=== Port-Daniel ===
The area was originally inhabited by the Mi'kmaq people, who called the place Epsegeneg, meaning "place where people warm themselves".

In 1534, Jacques Cartier visited the coast and named the bay (at the current townsite of Port-Daniel) Conche Saint-Martin. But Emmanuel Jumeau would record Port Daniel on his 1685 map, likely named after Dieppe merchant Charles Daniel, who made several voyages to New France as a ship captain. The name Port Daniel would also be used for the seignory that was established there, and granted to René Deneau in 1696.

Early in the 19th century, further development came with the arrival of Scottish settlers. By 1825, there were 825 settlers, mostly of Irish, English, and Jersey origin. Americans followed before the middle of the century and set up a lobster cannery there in 1847.

In 1845, the Township Municipality of Port-Daniel was created, abolished in 1847, and reestablished again in 1855. In 1882, it was divided into the Township Municipalities of Port-Daniel-Partie-Est (east part) and Port-Daniel-Partie-Ouest (west part). In 1990, these 2 township municipalities were joined again into the Municipality of Port-Daniel.

=== Gascons ===
Gascons Cove (French: Anse aux Gascons) was named after a sailor from Gascony who shipwrecked there. In the middle of the 19th century, the place was settled by Gascons, Normans, Acadians, Basques, and Jersey people.

In 1899, the Parish of Sainte-Germaine-de-l'Anse-aux-Gascons was founded, named after Germaine Cousin, a saint also of Gascon origin, and the cove. In 1902, the namesake parish municipality was established.

=== Port-Daniel–Gascons ===
Port-Daniel–Gascons was formed on January 17, 2001, through the merger of the Municipality of Port-Daniel (founded in 1990) and the Parish Municipality of Sainte-Germaine-de-l'Anse-aux-Gascons (founded in 1902).

In 2017, McInnis Cement, the largest cement plant in the province of Quebec, was inaugurated in the Municipality of Port-Daniel–Gascons. The cement plant was constructed between 2014 and 2017. It will bring in $2.1 million annually in tax revenue.

== Demographics ==
=== Population ===
Canada census – Port-Daniel--Gascons community profile

	2021	2016	2011
Population	2,271 (+2.8% from 2016)	2,210 (-9.9% from 2011)	2,453 (-5.1% from 2006)
Land area	300.29 km^{2} (115.94 sq mi)	301.60 km^{2} (116.45 sq mi)	302.69 km^{2} (116.87 sq mi)
Population density	7.6/km^{2} (20/sq mi)	7.3/km^{2} (19/sq mi)	8.1/km^{2} (21/sq mi)
Median age	56.0 (M: 54.4, F: 57.6)	54.7 (M: 54.1, F: 55.3)	50.8 (M: 49.8, F: 52.1)
Private dwellings	1,227 (total) 1,079 (occupied)	1,140 (total)	1,173 (total)
Median household income	$59,200	$48,384	$39,428

References: 2021 2016 2011

Historical Census Data - Port-Daniel–Gascons, Quebec
Year	Pop.	±%
2001	2,685	—
2006	2,586	−3.7%
2011	2,453	−5.1%
2016	2,210	−9.9%
2021	2,271	+2.8%
Source: Statistics Canada

=== Language ===
Canada Census Mother Tongue - Port-Daniel–Gascons, Quebec
Census	Total	French			English			French & English			Other		
Year	Responses	Count	Trend	Pop %	Count	Trend	Pop %	Count	Trend	Pop %	Count	Trend	Pop %
2021	2,270	1,965	▲1.0%	86.6%	285	▲16.3%	12.6%	15	0.0%	0.7%	10	▲100.0%	0.4%
2016	2,210	1,945	▼7.2%	88.0%	245	▼26.9%	11.1%	15	0.0%	0.7%	5	▲ n/a%	0.2%
2011	2,445	2,095	▼3.7%	85.7%	335	▼10.7%	13.7%	15	▲50.0%	0.6%	0	▼100.0%	0.0%
2006	2,580	2,175	n/a	84.3%	375	n/a	14.5%	10	n/a	0.4%	20	n/a	0.8%

== Government ==
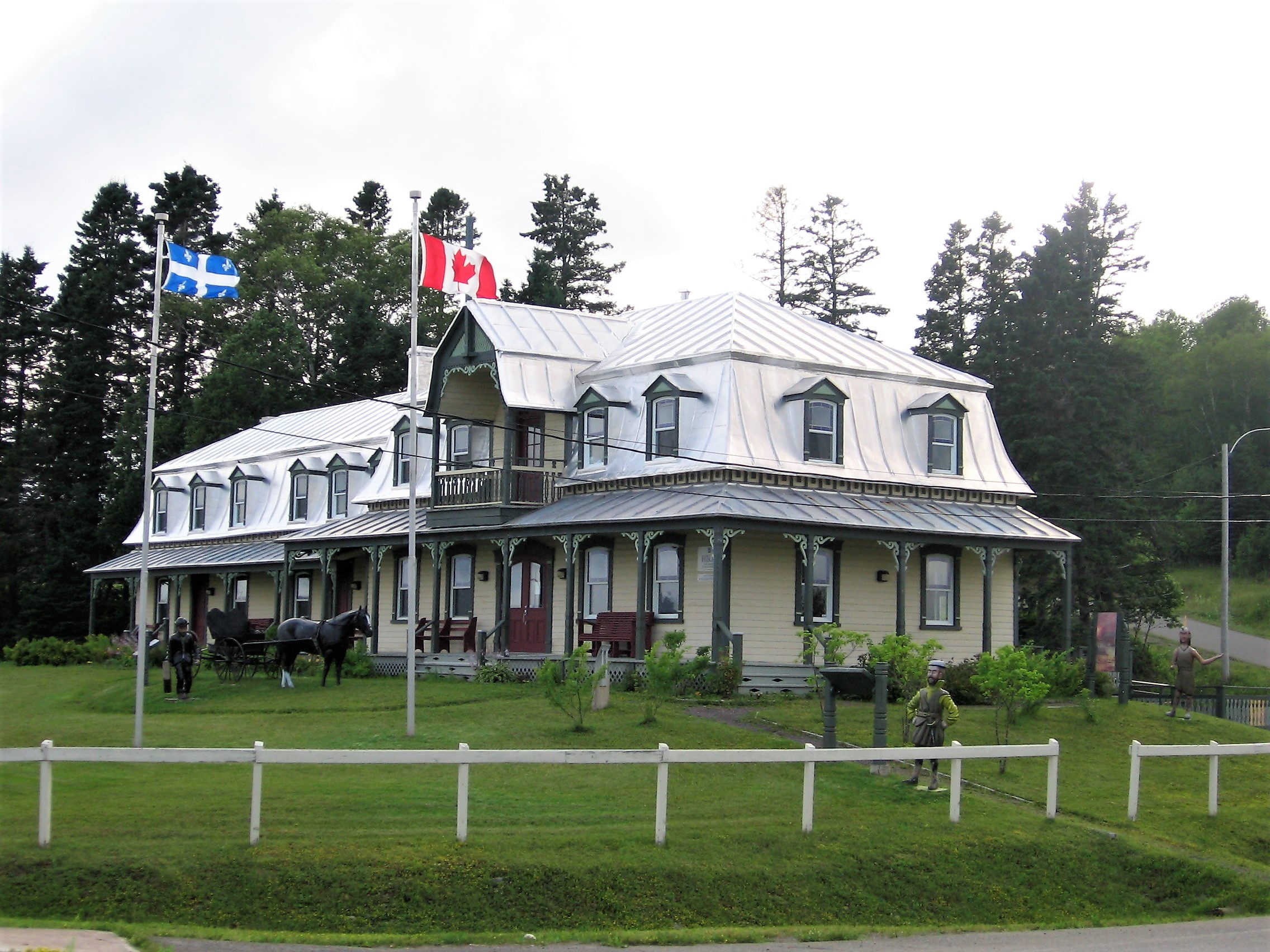
City Hall in Port-Daniel

The mayors of Port-Daniel–Gascons since 2001 are as follows:

- Maurice Anglehart (2001-2005)
- Henri Grenier (2005-2009)
- Maurice Anglehart (2009-2013)
- Henri Grenier (2013–present)

On October 1, 2021, Henri Grenier was re-elected without opposition for a fourth (third consecutive) term as mayor (2021-2025).

== Infrastructure ==
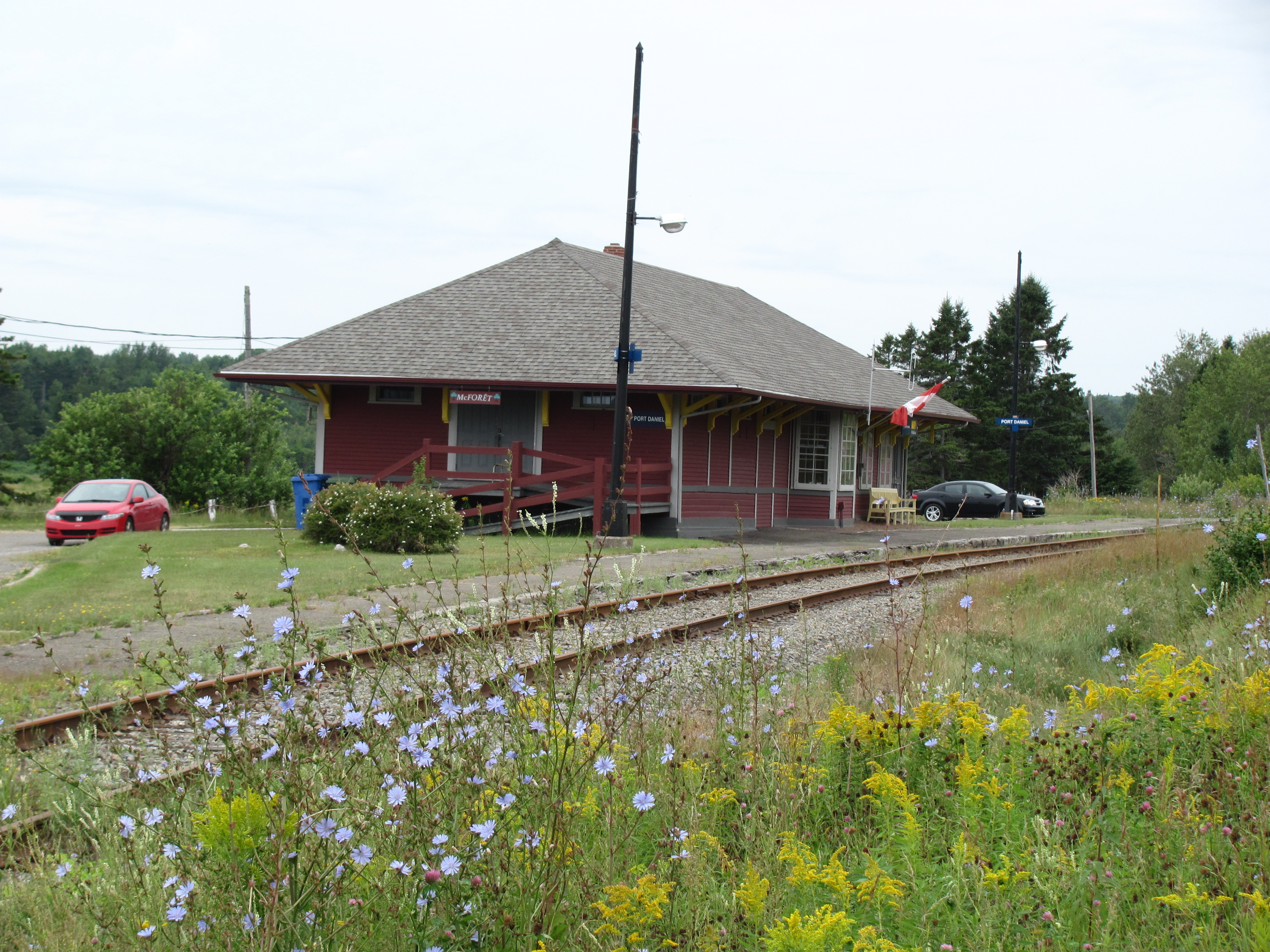
Train station in Port Daniel

The main road in town is Quebec Route 132.

VIA Rail ceased service to Port-Daniel station due to track closures and local bridge conditions in 2013. The station is located close to the city hall. Freight service, however, is available again since late 2025.

== Notable people ==
- Édouard Gagnon (1918 – 2007), a Canadian Roman Catholic Cardinal
- Hazel McCallion (1921 – 2023), former mayor of Mississauga, Ontario

== See also ==
- List of anglophone communities in Quebec
- List of municipalities in Quebec
