= New Richmond, Quebec =

New Richmond
- City
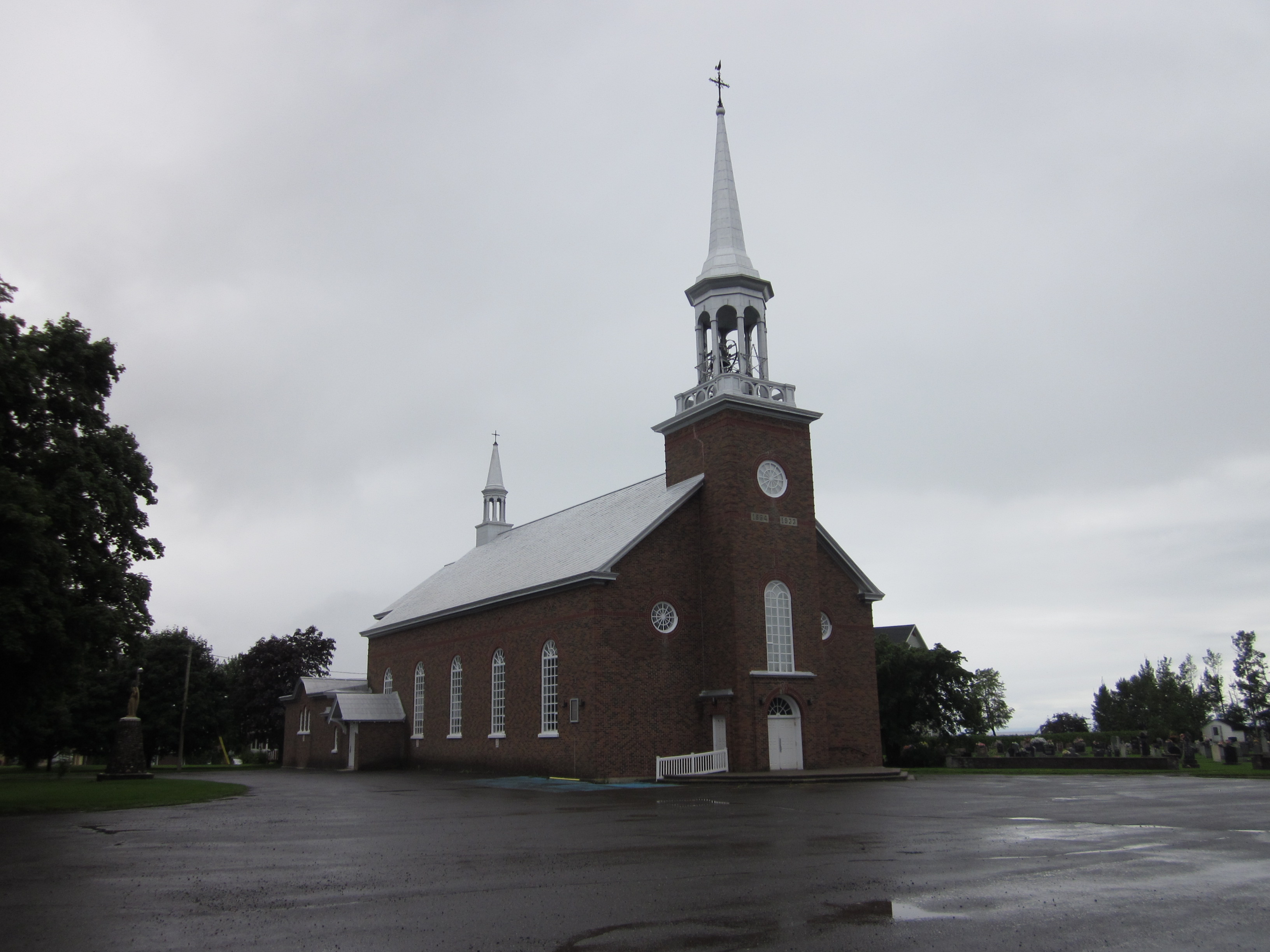
- Our Lady of the Saint Angels Church in New Richmond

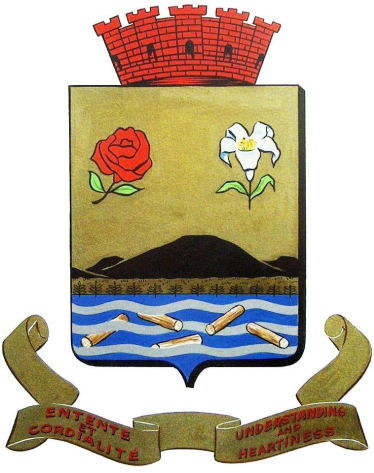
- Coat of arms
- Motto: Entente et Cordialité
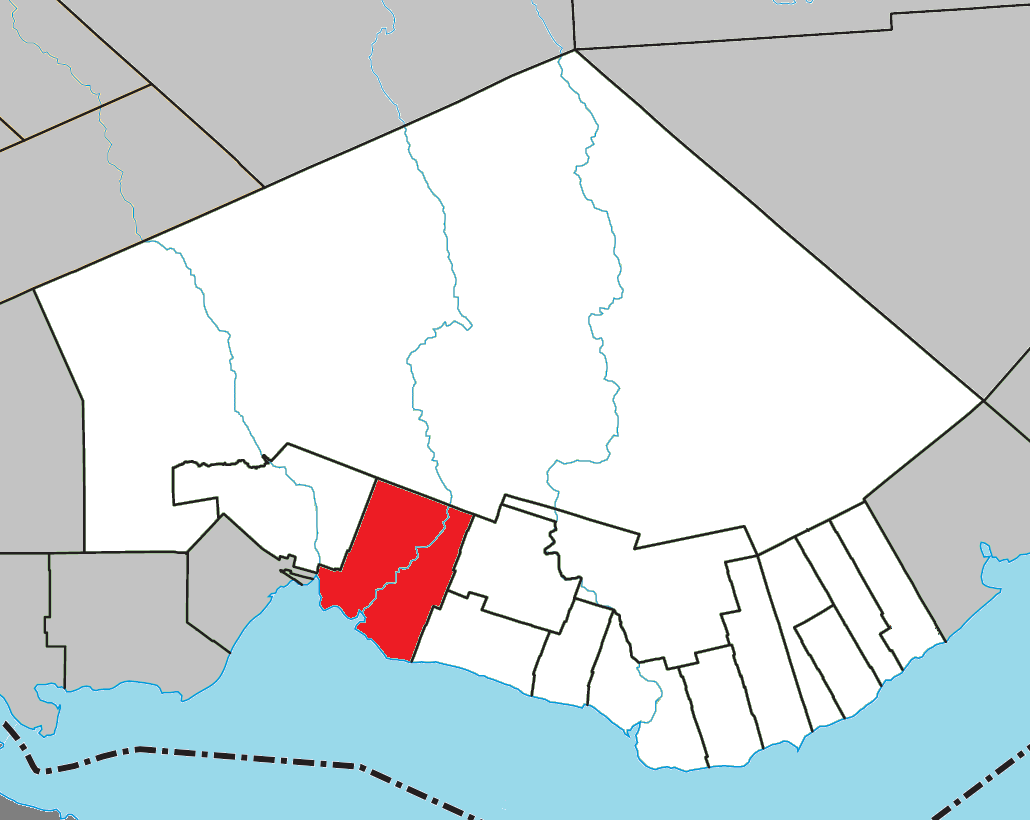
- Location within Bonaventure RCM

- Location in eastern Quebec
- Coordinates: 48°10′N 65°52′W
- Country: Canada
- Province: Quebec
- Region: Gaspésie– Îles-de-la-Madeleine
- RCM: Bonaventure
- Constituted: July 1, 1855

Government
  - Mayor: Eric Dubé
  - Federal riding: Gaspésie—Les Îles-de-la-Madeleine—Listuguj
  - Prov. riding: Bonaventure

Area
  - Total: 199.48 km^{2} (77.02 sq mi)
  - Land: 172.50 km^{2} (66.60 sq mi)
  - Urban: 4.04 km^{2} (1.56 sq mi)

Population (2021)
  - Total: 3,683
  - Density: 21.4/km^{2} (55/sq mi)
  - Urban: 1,886
  - Urban density: 467.2/km^{2} (1,210/sq mi)
  - Pop (2016-21): ▼0.6%
  - Dwellings: 1,805
- Time zone: UTC−5 (EST)
  - Summer (DST): UTC−4 (EDT)
- Postal code(s): G0C 1C0 & G0C 2B0
- Area codes: 418 and 581
- Highways: R-132
- Website: www.ville newrichmond.com

New Richmond (French pronunciation: [nju ʁitʃmənd]; Gesgapegiag Mi'kmaq: Qame'g, lit. 'other side (of the river)') is an incorporated municipality in Quebec, Canada, situated on the southern coast of the Gaspé Peninsula between the municipalities of Maria and Caplan.

New Richmond is bounded on the west by the Grand Cascapedia River. The Little Cascapedia runs to the east of the town proper. In addition to New Richmond itself, the town's territory also includes the communities of Black Cape and Saint-Edgar.

== History ==
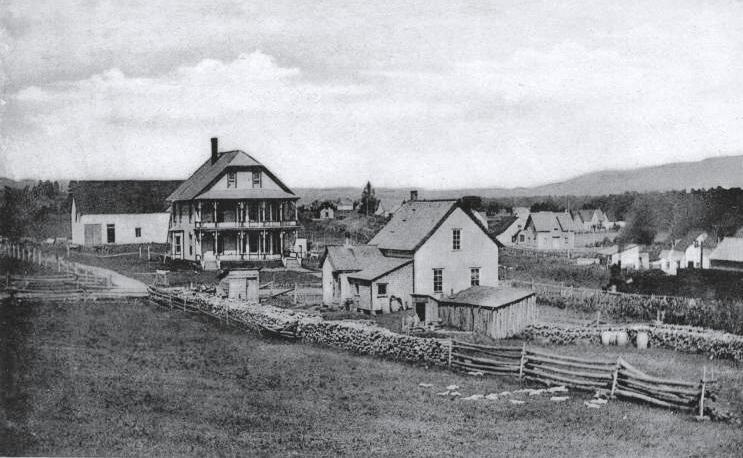
New Richmond in 1910

The first European settlers arrived from Scotland in 1755. The first arrivals were the Duthie brothers, George and John Duthie, and their families. Their descendants still reside in the area today. It is one of the very few remaining municipalities on the Gaspésie which still has a relatively large English-speaking population. It was originally a centre of farming, logging, and shipbuilding. A modern linerboard paper mill was opened there in 1966, then closed and subsequently demolished in 2005.

== Demographics ==
In the 2021 Census of Population conducted by Statistics Canada, New Richmond had a population of 3,683 living in 1,715 of its 1,805 total private dwellings, a change of −0.6% from its 2016 population of 3,706. With a land area of 172.5 km^{2} (66.6 sq mi), it had a population density of 21.4/km^{2} (55.3/sq mi) in 2021.

Canada census – New Richmond community profile

	2021	2016	2011
Population	3,683 (-0.6% from 2016)	3,706 (-2.7% from 2011)	3,810 (+1.7% from 2006)
Land area	172.50 km^{2} (66.60 sq mi)	171.34 km^{2} (66.15 sq mi)	168.84 km^{2} (65.19 sq mi)
Population density	21.4/km^{2} (55/sq mi)	21.6/km^{2} (56/sq mi)	22.6/km^{2} (59/sq mi)
Median age	50.8 (M: 49.6, F: 52.0)	50.3 (M: 49.4, F: 51.5)	44.4 (M: 43.7, F: 45.0)
Private dwellings	1,805 (total) 1,715 (occupied)	1,774 (total)	1,746 (total)
Median household income	$63,600	$54,480	$49,798

References: 2021 2016 2011

Historical Census Data - New Richmond, Quebec

Year	Pop.	±%
1861	1,510	—
1871	1,815	+20.2%
1881	1,893	+4.3%
1891	2,050	+8.3%
1901	2,318	+13.1%
1911	2,789	+20.3%
1921	2,711	−2.8%
1931	2,689	−0.8%

Year	Pop.	±%
1941	2,689	+0.0%
1951	2,539	−5.6%
1956	2,642	+4.1%
1961	2,628	−0.5%
1966	3,853	+46.6%
1971	3,957	+2.7%
1976	4,295	+8.5%
1981	4,257	−0.9%

Year	Pop.	±%
1986	4,100	−3.7%
1991	4,012	−2.1%
1996	3,941	−1.8%
2001	3,760	−4.6%
2006	3,748	−0.3%
2011	3,810	+1.7%
2016	3,706	−2.7%
2021	3,683	−0.6%

Source: Statistics Canada

Mother tongue language (2021):

Language	Population	Pct (%)
French only	3,095	85.1%
English only	465	12.8%
Both English and French	50	1.4%
Other languages	15	0.4%

== Economy ==
The town experienced considerable growth in the 1960s with the development of a linerboard paper mill by Bathurst paper, which became Consolidated Bathurst and after a number of name changes Smurfit Stone. Economic downturns in the region brought a reduction in mill operations and many residents left for other regions. In 2005 the mill completely shut down, leaving the town with no major industry.

There is a large wharf located to the east of the town. This was built to service cargo ships that would arrive to be loaded with kraft paper or bunker oil. It is now mainly recreational.

The town has a British Heritage Museum. There is a small shopping centre as well as an indoor swimming pool, a hockey arena, and a theatre.

== Infrastructure ==
Route 132, being the longest route in Quebec, connects New Richmond to the rest of the Gaspé Peninsula and continues all the way to the United States border. Bridge Henri A. Leblanc crosses the Little Cascapédia River in the city.

== Education ==
There is an English-language school (New Richmond High School) located in the centre of town which serves now grades K-11. French-speaking children have their own school (Bois Vivant) and complete high school in the town of Carleton.

== Notable people ==
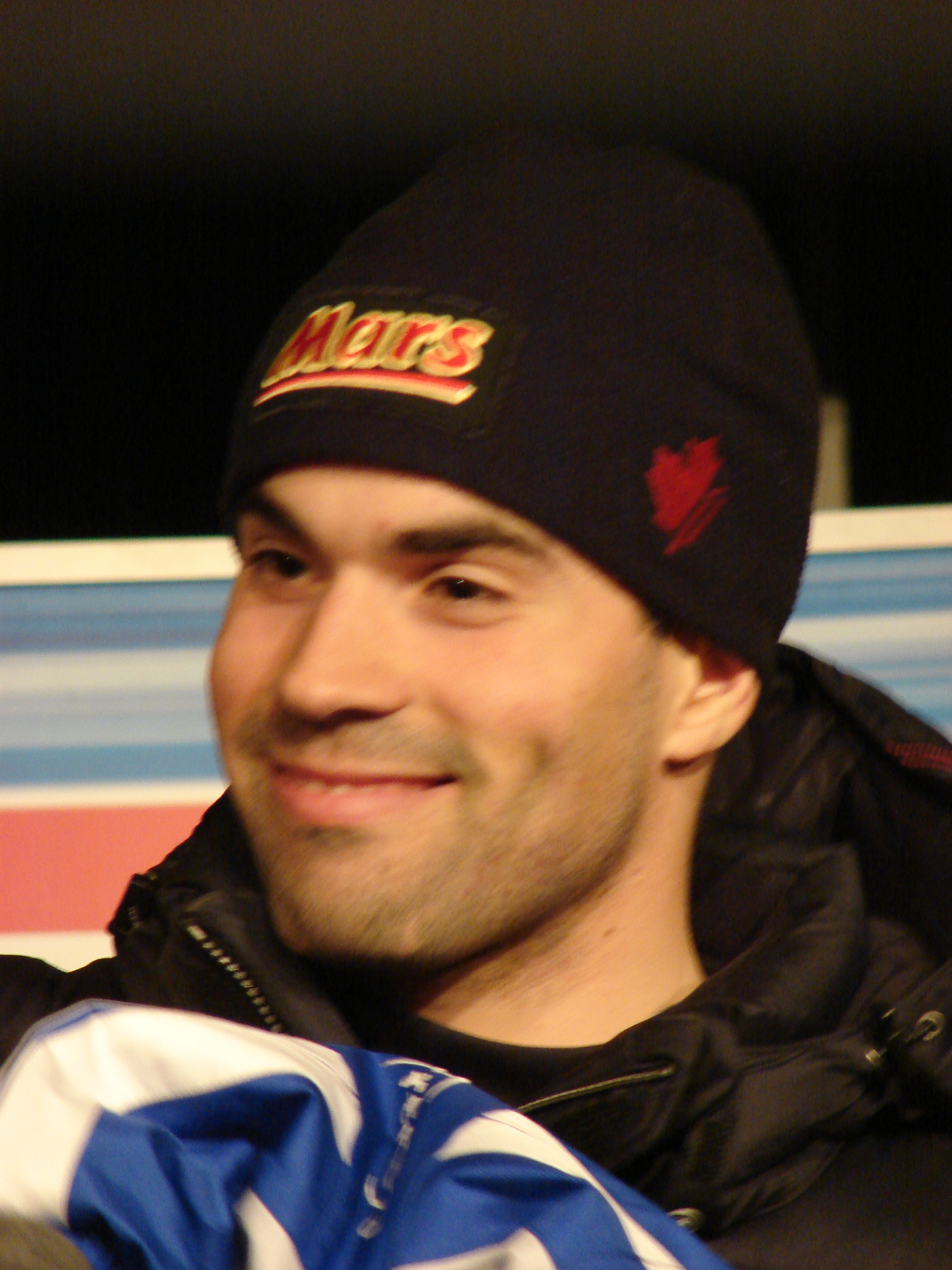
François Bourque

- François Bourque (born 1984), alpine skier
- Paul Willett (born 1969), hockey player

== See also ==
- List of anglophone communities in Quebec
- List of cities in Quebec
