= New Carlisle, Quebec =

New Carlisle Antaguejue'gati (Mi'kmaq) Galla'ing (Mi'kmaq)
- Municipality
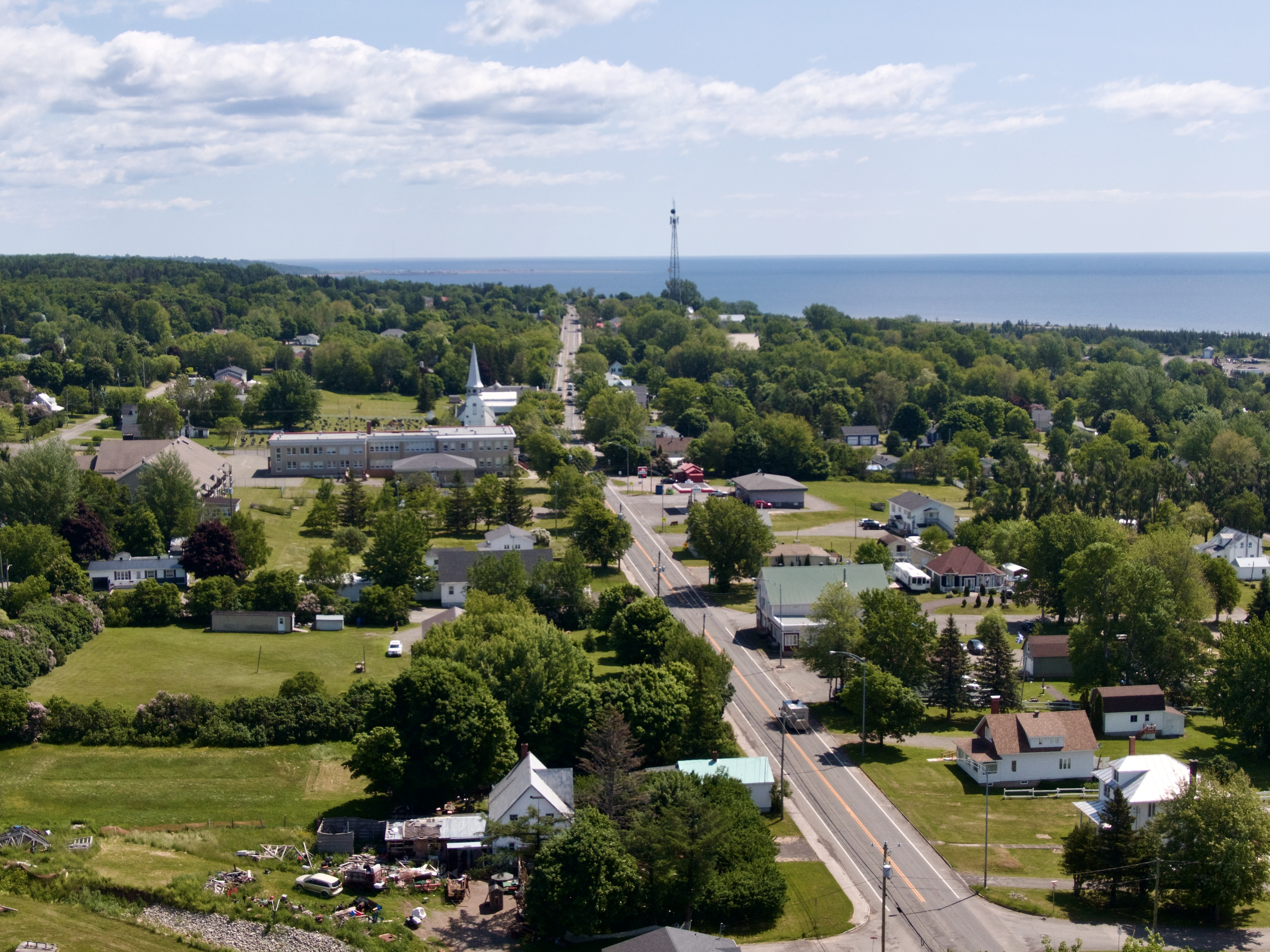

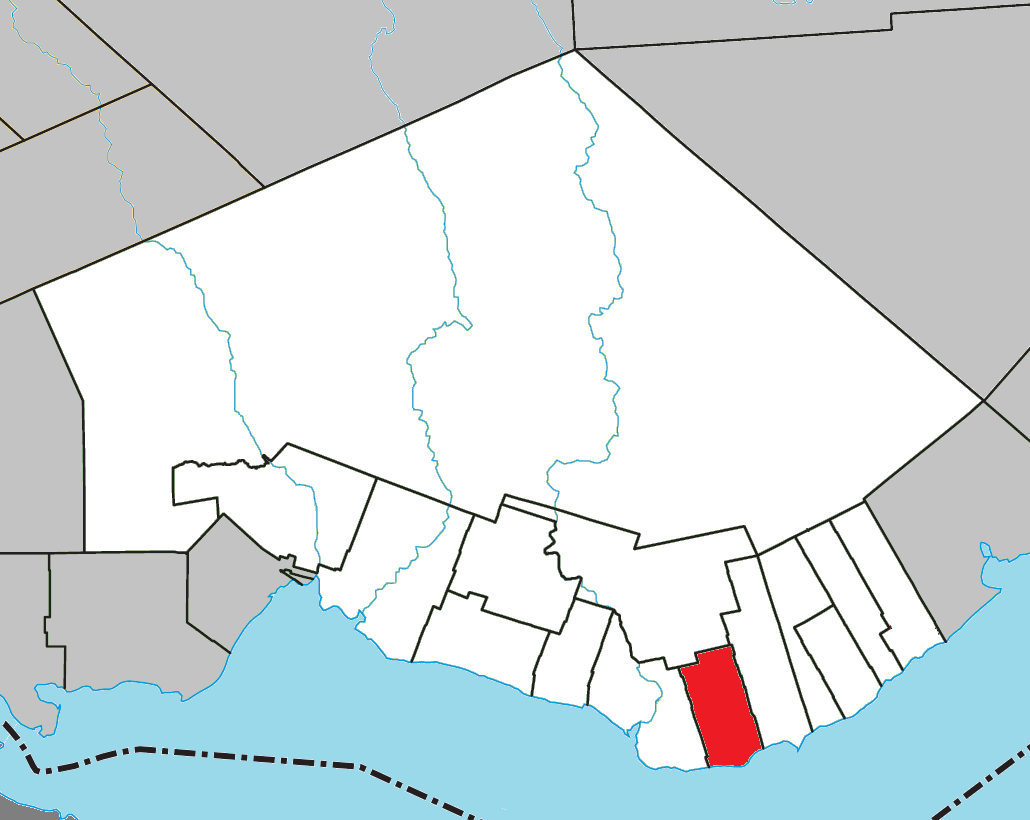
- Location within Bonaventure RCM

- Location in eastern Quebec
- Coordinates: 48°01′N 65°20′W
- Country: Canada
- Province: Quebec
- Region: Gaspésie– Îles-de-la-Madeleine
- RCM: Bonaventure
- Settled: 1784
- Constituted: February 1, 1877

Government
  - Mayor: Patrice Leclerc
  - Federal riding: Gaspésie—Les Îles-de-la-Madeleine—Listuguj
  - Prov. riding: Bonaventure

Area
  - Total: 68.09 km^{2} (26.29 sq mi)
  - Land: 67.99 km^{2} (26.25 sq mi)
- Elevation: 45.00 m (147.64 ft)

Population (2021)
  - Total: 1,336
  - Density: 19.6/km^{2} (51/sq mi)
  - Pop (2016-21): ▼3.7%
  - Dwellings: 668
- Time zone: UTC−5 (EST)
  - Summer (DST): UTC−4 (EDT)
- Postal code(s): G0C 1Z0
- Area codes: 418 and 581
- Highways: R-132
- Website: www.new-carlisle.ca

New Carlisle (French pronunciation: [nju kaʁlajl]; Mi'kmaq: Antaguejue'gati or Galla'ing) is a town in the Gaspésie–Îles-de-la-Madeleine region of Quebec, Canada. It best known as the boyhood home of René Lévesque although he was born in Campbellton, New Brunswick. Its population is approximately 1,336, approximately two thirds of whom are anglophone and the remainder francophone. New Carlisle is located on the Baie des Chaleurs.

New Carlisle is the seat of Bonaventure Regional County Municipality, the judicial district of Bonaventure, and the regional base for the Ministry of Transports Quebec, which has an operations centre on the outskirts of town. New Carlisle has a post office, primary and high schools, five different churches, and many other services. New Carlisle was served by passenger rail on the Montreal–Gaspé train until August 2013 when Canada's national passenger system VIA Rail suspended the route owing to poor track and bridge conditions. Replacement buses served the route until September 2013. Repair of the rail line began in 2020 and the Government of Quebec announced in 2023 that service would be restored in 2026 after the completion of a multi-year $872 million project to completely rehabilitate the Gaspé railway.

== History ==
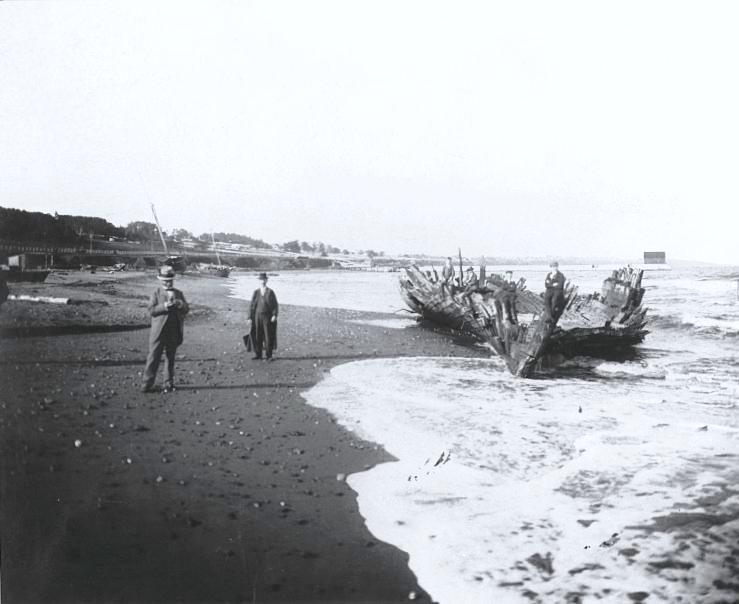
Port of New Carlisle, circa 1890

Originally a Mi'kmaq site called Antagoetjoitog, meaning "at the Black's", the site of the town was selected in 1784 by the Lieutenant-Governor of the jurisdictional District of Gaspe, Nicholas Cox. The town is thought to have been named after Cox's home town, possibly Carlisle, England. Soon after the name was changed from "Carlisle" to "New Carlisle". The original settlers of 1784 were discharged soldiers of British Army regiments and Loyalists claimants. In 1842, the geographic Cox Township was proclaimed. It was also known as Petit-Paspébiac in the 19th century.

The area was first incorporated as the Township Municipality of Cox in 1845, dissolved in 1847, but reestablished again in 1855. On February 1, 1877, the Township Municipality of Cox was dissolved and divided into the Municipalities of New Carlisle and Paspébiac.

The town was the scene of the capture of the German spy Werner von Janowski, who was dropped from a nearby U-boat in November 1942.

== Geography ==
=== Climate ===
Climate data for New Carlisle (normals 1991-2020, extremes 1963-present)
Month	Jan	Feb	Mar	Apr	May	Jun	Jul	Aug	Sep	Oct	Nov	Dec	Year
Record high humidex	10.7	9.1	18.1	24.6	37.3	43.6	41.8	41.0	38.5	28.1	20.4	14.7	43.6
Record high °C (°F)	10.2 (50.4)	9.6 (49.3)	18.0 (64.4)	27.0 (80.6)	31.7 (89.1)	34.1 (93.4)	33.1 (91.6)	35.5 (95.9)	31.4 (88.5)	26.7 (80.1)	19.9 (67.8)	12.0 (53.6)	35.5 (95.9)
Mean maximum °C (°F)	4.4 (39.9)	4.3 (39.7)	8.3 (46.9)	16.6 (61.9)	23.9 (75.0)	27.8 (82.0)	29.2 (84.6)	28.8 (83.8)	25.8 (78.4)	19.7 (67.5)	13.5 (56.3)	6.7 (44.1)	30.5 (86.9)
Mean daily maximum °C (°F)	−5.8 (21.6)	−4.9 (23.2)	0.1 (32.2)	6.1 (43.0)	13.3 (55.9)	19.1 (66.4)	22.7 (72.9)	22.2 (72.0)	17.8 (64.0)	10.8 (51.4)	4.2 (39.6)	−1.9 (28.6)	8.6 (47.6)
Daily mean °C (°F)	−10.1 (13.8)	−9.4 (15.1)	−4.3 (24.3)	2.0 (35.6)	8.3 (46.9)	13.9 (57.0)	17.8 (64.0)	17.3 (63.1)	12.9 (55.2)	6.9 (44.4)	0.9 (33.6)	−5.4 (22.3)	4.2 (39.6)
Mean daily minimum °C (°F)	−14.2 (6.4)	−13.8 (7.2)	−8.7 (16.3)	−2.2 (28.0)	3.3 (37.9)	8.7 (47.7)	12.8 (55.0)	12.4 (54.3)	8.0 (46.4)	2.9 (37.2)	−2.4 (27.7)	−8.9 (16.0)	−0.2 (31.7)
Mean minimum °C (°F)	−23.1 (−9.6)	−23.3 (−9.9)	−19.4 (−2.9)	−9.1 (15.6)	−1.8 (28.8)	2.5 (36.5)	7.9 (46.2)	6.8 (44.2)	1.0 (33.8)	−3.4 (25.9)	−10.7 (12.7)	−18.2 (−0.8)	−25.1 (−13.2)
Record low °C (°F)	−31.5 (−24.7)	−29.0 (−20.2)	−25.0 (−13.0)	−17.3 (0.9)	−6.1 (21.0)	−2.5 (27.5)	4.3 (39.7)	3.3 (37.9)	−1.9 (28.6)	−9.4 (15.1)	−21.2 (−6.2)	−27.0 (−16.6)	−31.5 (−24.7)
Record low wind chill	−41.2	−41.8	−34.8	−26.6	−8.2	−3.3	0.0	0.0	−4.9	−11.7	−23.2	−39.5	−41.8
Average precipitation mm (inches)	83.4 (3.28)	71.1 (2.80)	91.5 (3.60)	73.2 (2.88)	89.6 (3.53)	94.4 (3.72)	95.5 (3.76)	82.9 (3.26)	89.7 (3.53)	116.5 (4.59)	100.5 (3.96)	106.4 (4.19)	1,094.7 (43.1)
Average dew point °C (°F)	−13.1 (8.4)	−13.0 (8.6)	−8.7 (16.3)	−3.2 (26.2)	3.2 (37.8)	9.3 (48.7)	13.9 (57.0)	13.4 (56.1)	9.4 (48.9)	3.2 (37.8)	−2.6 (27.3)	−8.4 (16.9)	0.3 (32.5)
Source 1: Environment Canada
Source 2: weatherstats.ca

== Demographics ==
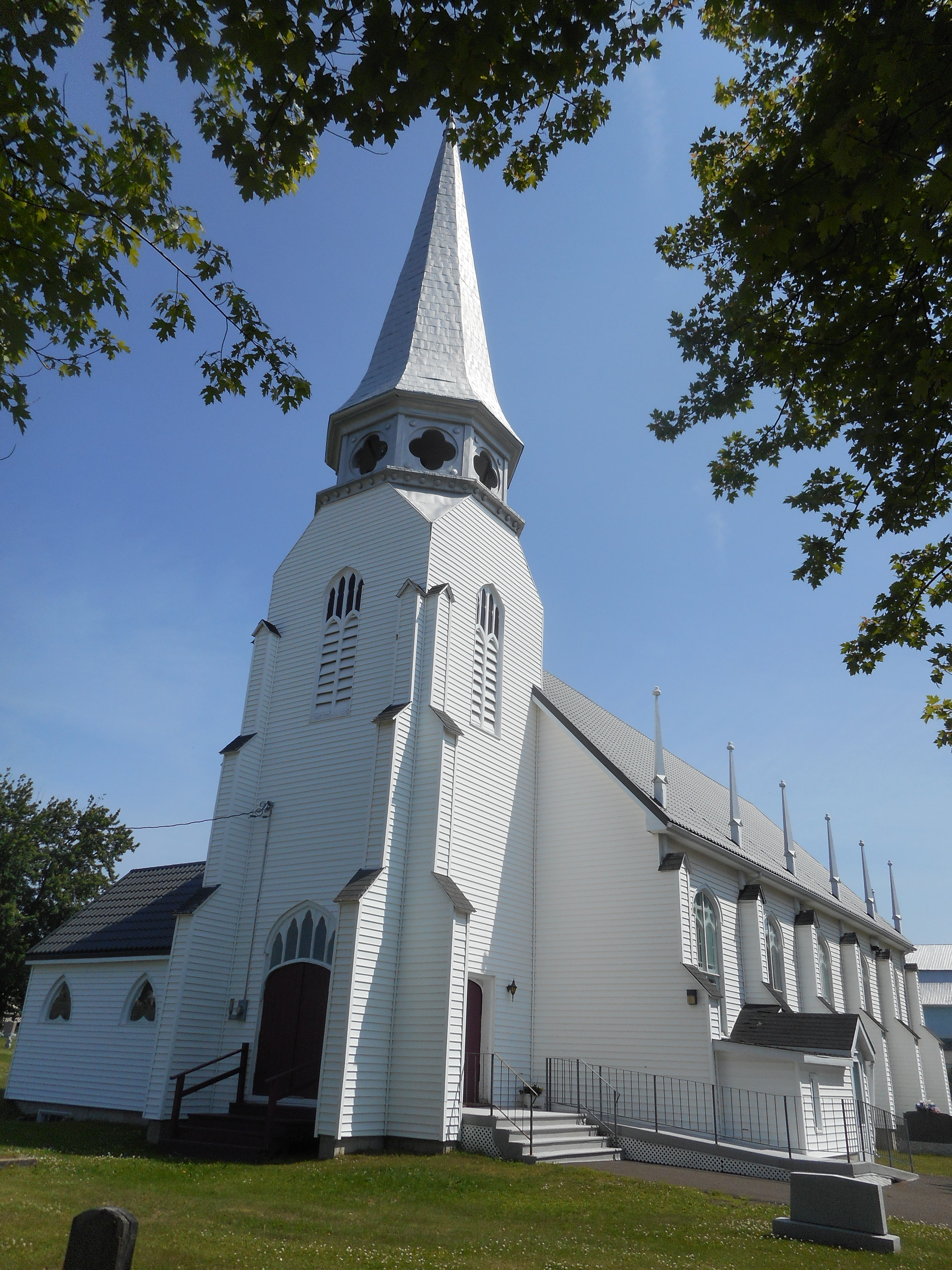
Saint-Andrew Church in New Carlisle

=== Population ===
Canada census – New Carlisle community profile

	2021	2016	2011
Population	1,336 (-3.7% from 2016)	1,388 (+2.2% from 2011)	1,358 (-0.9% from 2006)
Land area	67.99 km^{2} (26.25 sq mi)	67.77 km^{2} (26.17 sq mi)	67.57 km^{2} (26.09 sq mi)
Population density	19.6/km^{2} (51/sq mi)	20.5/km^{2} (53/sq mi)	20.1/km^{2} (52/sq mi)
Median age	53.2 (M: 51.6, F: 54.4)	49.9 (M: 49.2, F: 50.7)	51.4 (M: 49.6, F: 52.8)
Private dwellings	668 (total) 603 (occupied)	666 (total)	594 (total)
Median household income	$59,200	$44,608	$40,766

References: 2021 2016 2011

Historical Census Data - New Carlisle, Quebec

Year	Pop.	±%
1881	1,525	—
1891	991	−35.0%
1901	1,027	+3.6%
1911	1,104	+7.5%
1921	1,273	+15.3%
1931	1,316	+3.4%
1941	1,438	+9.3%
1951	1,617	+12.4%

Year	Pop.	±%
1956	1,667	+3.1%
1961	1,780	+6.8%
1966	1,650	−7.3%
1971	1,855	+12.4%
1976	1,774	−4.4%
1981	1,753	−1.2%
1986	1,674	−4.5%
1991	1,568	−6.3%

Year	Pop.	±%
1996	1,538	−1.9%
2001	1,431	−7.0%
2006	1,370	−4.3%
2011	1,358	−0.9%
2016	1,388	+2.2%
2021	1,336	−3.7%

Source: Statistics Canada

=== Language ===
Mother tongue (2021):

- English as first language: 56.6%
- French as first language: 39.1%
- English and French as first language: 3.9%
- Other as first language: 0.4%

== Notable people ==
- René Lévesque
- Théodore Robitaille, senator who was elected as a member from Bonaventure County and commissioned the Words and music for O Canada in 1885

== See also ==
- List of anglophone communities in Quebec
- List of municipalities in Quebec
