= Matapédia, Quebec =

Matapédia Matawe'g (Mi'kmaq)
- Municipality
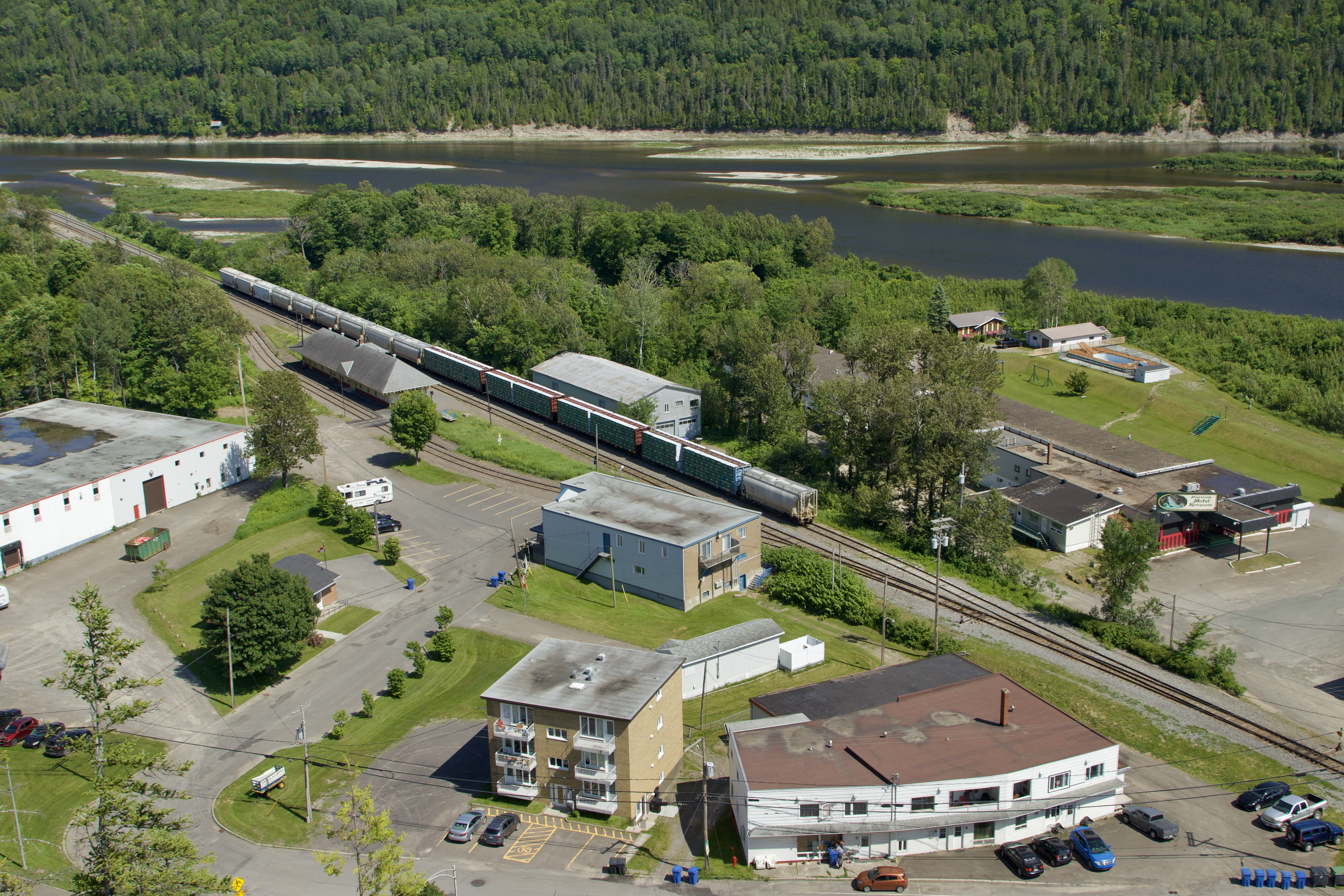
- Skyline of Matapédia

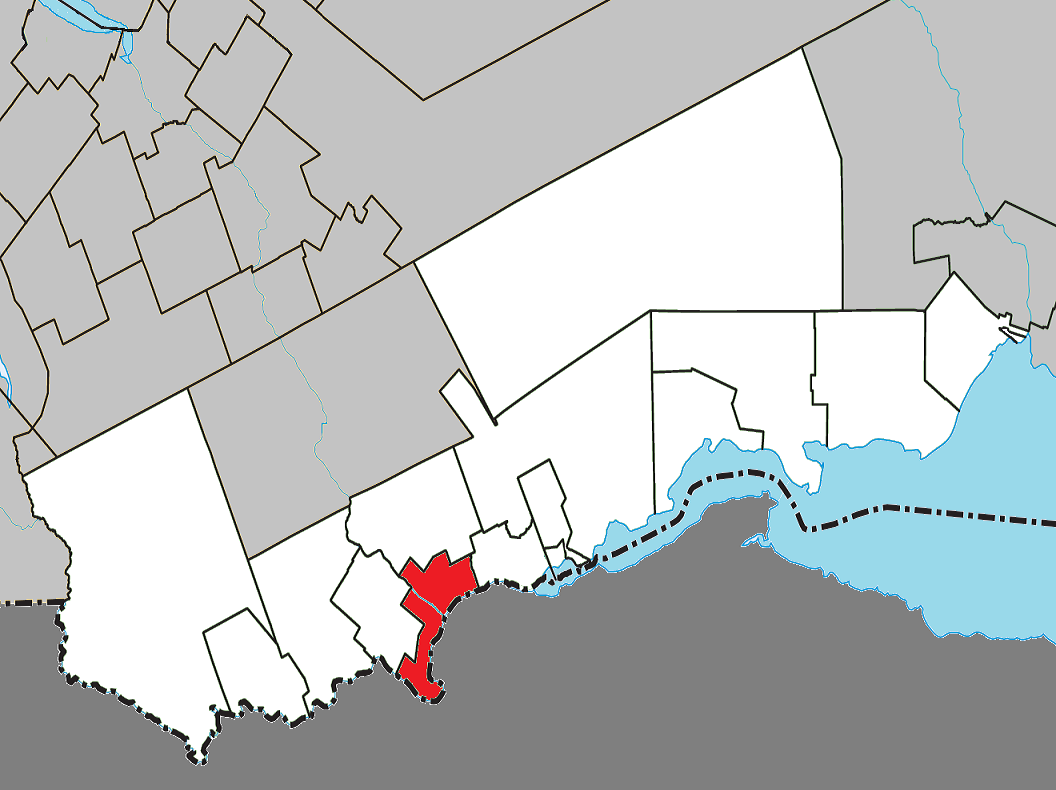
- Location within Avignon RCM

- Location in eastern Quebec
- Coordinates: 47°58′N 66°57′W
- Country: Canada
- Province: Quebec
- Region: Gaspésie– Îles-de-la-Madeleine
- RCM: Avignon
- Settled: 1808
- Constituted: November 4, 1905

Government
  - Mayor: Nicole Lagacé
  - Federal riding: Gaspésie—Les Îles-de-la-Madeleine—Listuguj
  - Prov. riding: Bonaventure

Area
  - Total: 72.83 km^{2} (28.12 sq mi)
  - Land: 71.59 km^{2} (27.64 sq mi)

Population (2021)
  - Total: 566
  - Density: 7.9/km^{2} (20/sq mi)
  - Pop 2016-2021: ▼12.2%
  - Dwellings: 357
- Time zone: UTC−5 (EST)
  - Summer (DST): UTC−4 (EDT)
- Postal code(s): G0J 1V0
- Area codes: 418 and 581
- Highways: R-132
- Website: www.matapedialesplateaux.com/matapedia/

Matapédia (French pronunciation: [matapedja]; Mi'kmaq: Matawe'g, lit. 'confluence of rivers') former known as Saint-Laurent-de-Matapédia is a municipality at the southern tip of the Gaspé Peninsula, in eastern Quebec, Canada. Matapédia is located along Quebec Route 132 on the border of New Brunswick.

In addition to Matapédia itself, the municipality also includes the hamlets of Mann Settlement, Runnymede, and Matapédia West.

Its name may derive from the Mi'kmaq word matapegiag, meaning "river junction", from the parts mata (junction) and pegiag (river), referring to the Matapédia River that crosses the town just before its confluence with the Restigouche River. Another source from the late nineteenth century indicates that the Mi'kmaq named the area Magabegeak which means "roughly flowing". It has also been spelled many different ways over time such as Matapediach, Madapeguia, Matapeguia, Matapediac, Matakpediack, Madapeguia, Metapedia, or Matapediac.

Residents and village expatriates are known as Matapedians.

== History ==
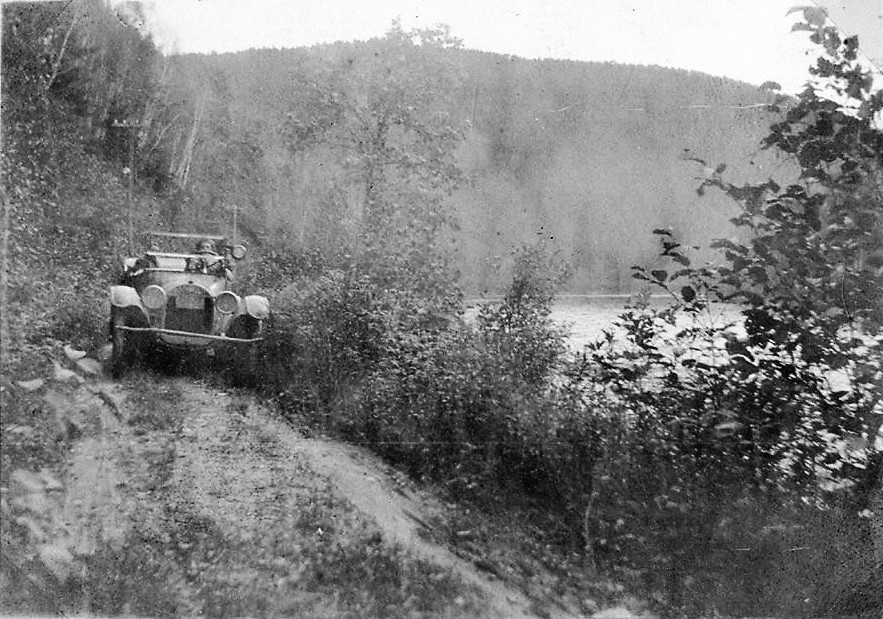
First car to cross the valley between Matapédia and Causapscal in 1914

=== Colonization ===
In 1808, colonization began with the arrival of Loyalists, followed by Scottish settlers in 1828, then Irish settlers in 1850, Acadians in 1860, and French Canadians in 1865. The feat of colonization was no simple act, the entire valley had undergone immense forest fires at the middle of the 19th century, with building woods scarce. According to a commissioned report, a thousand square miles of forest had burned in the 1864 blaze, and even worst, the river had flooded in 1865.

In 1842, the geographic township was formed, named after the Matapédia River. In 1860, a mission is established, and in 1864, the Matapédia Post Office opened. On November 4, 1905, the place was incorporated as the Parish Municipality of Saint-Laurent-de-Matapédia, named after the local parish and township. But since 1973, it has been officially known by its abbreviated name Matapédia.

=== Present day ===
The village has one general store and a designated Heritage Railway Station since 1994. The economy is mainly focused on the local geography, with activities such as salmon fishing, fly tying, hunting and tourism. For many years the town contained a baseball field, then it was transformed into a soccer field, now it is the municipal campground. Matapédia contains a CLSC, although the closest hospital is on the New Brunswick side: the Restigouche Hospital Centre on Salmon Boulevard. The town also contains a belvedere facing the main part of town over 200 metres up. Fishing remains an important part of the Matapédia economy and heritage, conservation efforts have been made to help the Atlantic salmon in both rivers, such as protection of breeding grounds. On February 27, 2010, the status of the parish municipality was changed to just municipality. A ski hill exists in the village, known as Petit Chamonix since the mid-twentieth century. The Provigo warehouse has been abandoned for the past 15 years, on the side of the 132 Highway.

== Geography ==
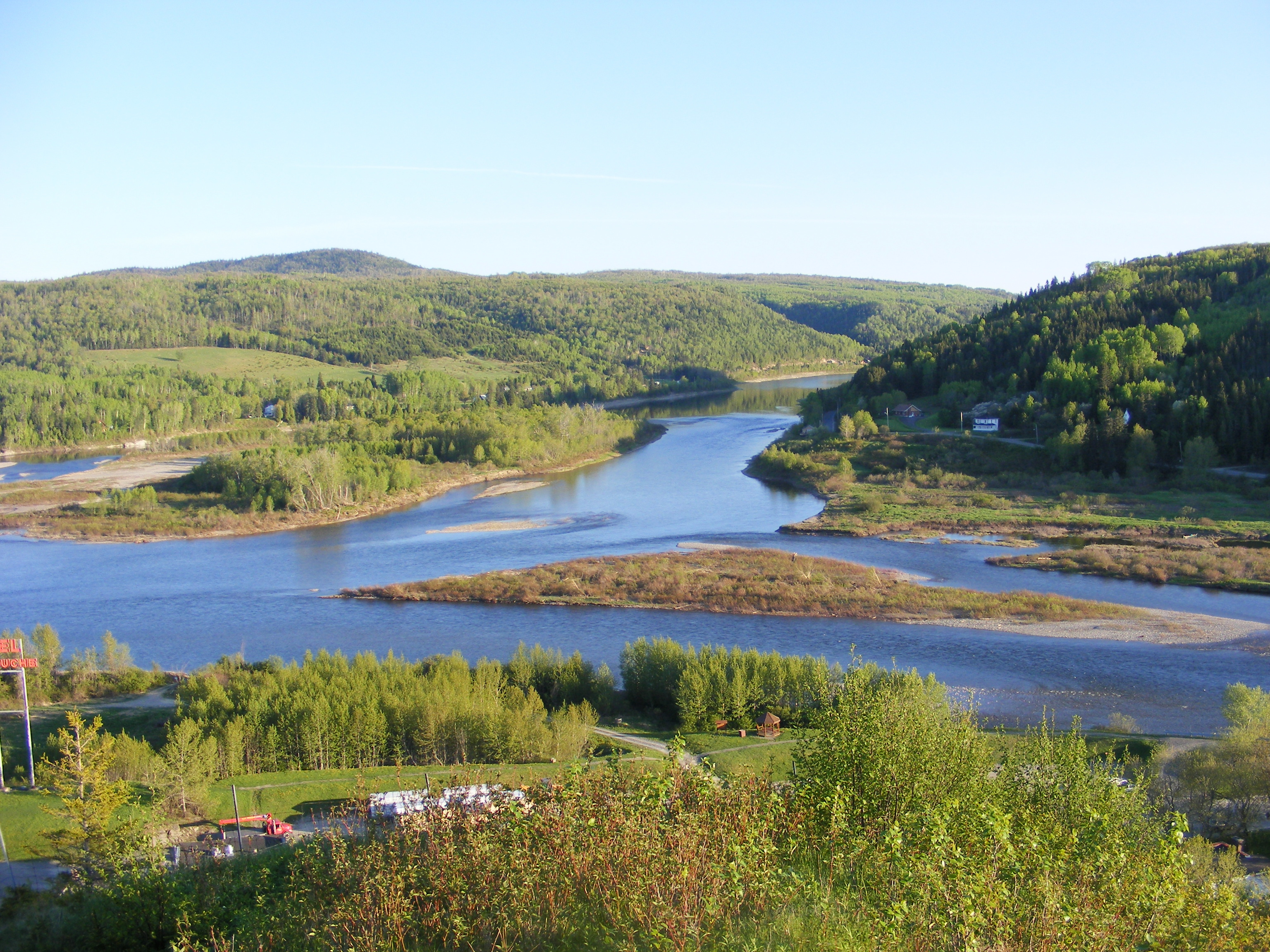
Confluence of Matapédia and Restigouche Rivers

Matapédia is located south of the Saint Lawrence River on the south side of the Gaspé Peninsula at the eastern end of the Matapédia Valley at the mouth of the Matapédia River in junction with the Restigouche River. It is located 500 km northeast of Quebec City and 350 km southwest of the city of Gaspé. The major cities near Matapedia are Campbellton, New Brunswick 25 km to the east and Amqui 80 km to the northwest.

The municipality of Matapédia is part of the regional county municipality of Avignon in the administrative region of Gaspésie–Îles-de-la-Madeleine. It includes three hamlets:

- Mann Settlement
- Matapédia West
- Runnymede

=== Recurring floods ===
The junction of the Matapédia River and Restigouche River floods into the village during the thaw of the ice during the onset of spring. Notable floods (natural disasters) have occurred in:

- 1861 - autumn - damage to the highway and minor damage to a bridge, the Commissioner of Public Works was warned that a breakwater could be built to help stop persistent flooding.
- 1896-1897 - spring - very devastating flooding.
- 1959 - April 23 - a large ice jam developed under the Matapédia bridge, Transports Québec attempted to unblock the jam with dynamite however never revealed the outcome of the attempt.
- 1974 - January 19 - a flood develops at Routhierville, Quebec which causes 3 miles of the highway to flood and the town to flood.
- 1974 - April 29 to May 18 - massive flooding caused evacuations as well as flooding of the Motel Restigouche, the CCGS Tupper was eventually called in to help.
- 1992 - April 23 - a fast flood developed which caused evacuations in Runnymede while for a half day the Motel Restigouche and corresponding street "Rue des Saumons" were inundated, the flood was comparative to the 1974 flood but shorter in time.
- 1994 - April 16 and 17 - 4 bridges destroyed or heavily damaged, Main Street inundated, all highway links to the town flooded, 100 citizens evacuated.
- 2008 - April 21 - Restigouche River overflows and causes minor damages and evacuations.

=== Cause of floods ===
Since 1962, the Environment Canada hydrologic station located on the upper portion of the Restigouche River has reported substantial increases of water flow, sometimes at over 400% above previous levels. Clear cutting of forest on both the Matapédia River and Restigouche River has created areas with no shade along the banks of the river, resulting in a faster melt than in previous years. Furthermore, the clear cut land lacks the naturally occurring moss which would help colloidal suspension in soil and retention. This creates the ideal condition for Spring thawing. Another factor in the flooding is the construction of bridges in the rivers, with the dykes acting as dams, further blocking passage of the flow. This information was sent to the United Nations Commission on Human Rights in a complaint by former owner of the Motel, Peter Dubé.

== Demographics ==
According to Statistics Canada, the population of Matapédia, Quebec was 566 inhabitants in 2021. The demographic trend in recent years follows the overall pattern of Gaspé Peninsula and Bas-Saint-Laurent, that is to say a steady decrease. This corresponds to a decrease of 12.2% in five years. The median age of Matapédia residents is higher than in most of Quebec at 58.8 years.

The total number of dwellings in the municipality is 357, however only 307 of these units are occupied by permanent residents. The majority of homes are Matapedia villas and apartment buildings.

According to Statistics Canada immigration is nearly non-existent in Matapédia. 77% of the population has French listed as mother tongue and 19% are English-speaking Quebecers. However, 44% of the population masters the two official languages of Canada. For single language speakers, 44% speak only French and 13% speak only English. Two percent of Matapédians identify as indigenous.

The unemployment rate in the municipality was 16% in 2021. The median income of Matapédiens was $33,200 in 2020.

According to Statistics Canada, 31% of the population 15 years and over Matapédia has no high school diploma education. 29% of the population has only a high school diploma or vocational. All Matapedia graduates completed their studies in Canada.

=== Statistics ===
Canada census – Matapédia community profile

	2021	2016	2011
Population	566 (-12.2% from 2016)	645 (-2.9%% from 2011)	664 (-4.6% from 2006)
Land area	71.59 km^{2} (27.64 sq mi)	71.55 km^{2} (27.63 sq mi)	72.49 km^{2} (27.99 sq mi)
Population density	7.9/km^{2} (20/sq mi)	9.0/km^{2} (23/sq mi)	9.2/km^{2} (24/sq mi)
Median age	58.8 (M: 57.2, F: 60.4)	54.4 (M: 54.0, F: 54.9)	49.7 (M: 48.3, F: 51.1)
Private dwellings	357 (total) 307 (occupied)	365 (total)	360 (total)
Median household income	$49,600	$44,715	$43,139

References: 2021 2016 2011

Historical Census Data - Matapédia, Quebec

Year	Pop.	±%
1911	865	—
1921	839	−3.0%
1931	1,067	+27.2%
1941	1,193	+11.8%
1951	1,042	−12.7%
1956	1,060	+1.7%
1961	982	−7.4%

Year	Pop.	±%
1966	1,012	+3.1%
1971	974	−3.8%
1976	872	−10.5%
1981	845	−3.1%
1986	818	−3.2%
1991	786	−3.9%
1996	749	−4.7%

Year	Pop.	±%
2001	707	−5.6%
2006	696	−1.6%
2011	664	−4.6%
2016	645	−2.9%
2021	566	−12.2%

Source: Statistics Canada

=== Language ===
Mother tongue (2021):

- English as mother tongue: 19.3%
- French as mother tongue: 77.1%
- English and French as mother tongue: 3.7%
- Other as mother tongue: 0.9%

== Attractions ==
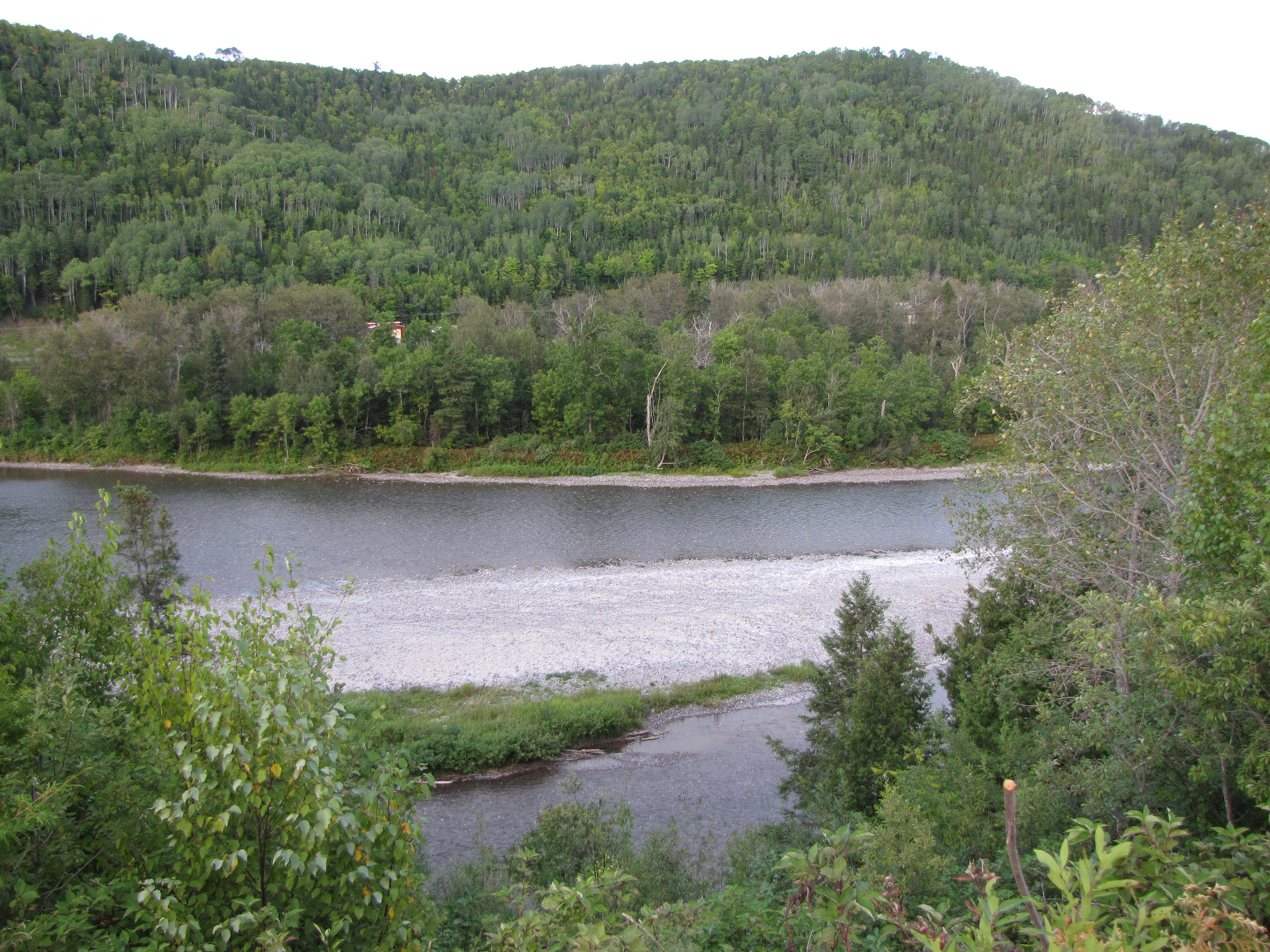
Matapédia River in Matapédia

The Matapédia River is internationally recognized for its many pools for fishing for Atlantic salmon. To safeguard these pools for future generations, the wildlife reserve Rivières-Matapédia-et-Patapédia was established on a part of its course to protect this resource. The Matapédia flat is located near the mouth of the Restigouche just north of the bridge.

== Government ==
The Matapédia municipal council consists of a mayor and six councilors elected in rotating block every four years without territorial division.

2025 - 2029	mayor	Serge Normandeau
2025 - 2029	councillors	
2025 - 2029	# 1	Laurie-Anne Litalien
2025 - 2029	# 2	Owen Ferguson
2025 - 2029	# 3	Sylvia Gallant
2025 - 2029	# 4	Mylène Lagacé
2025 - 2029	# 5	Caroline Andrieux
2025 - 2029	# 6	David Leblanc

Furthermore, Geneviève Moffatt is the Director-general, secretary treasurer and coordinator for emergency measures for the municipality.

=== Political representation ===
Federally, Matapédia is part of the federal riding of Gaspésie—Les Îles-de-la-Madeleine—Listuguj, as a result of 2022 Canadian federal electoral redistribution. In the 2025 Canadian federal election, the incumbent Diane Lebouthillier of the Liberal was unseated by the Bloc Québécois candidate Alexis Deschênes to represent the population Matapédia in the House of Commons of Canada.

Provincially it is part of the riding of Bonaventure. In the 2026 Quebec general election MNA Pier-Luc Bujold, of the Parti Québécois, was elected to represent the population of Matapédia in the National Assembly of Quebec.

Matapédia federal election results
Year	Liberal		Conservative		Bloc Québécois		New Democratic		Green	
2021	37%	127	12%	41	38%	129	4%	15	0%	0
2019	49%	184	14%	51	26%	98	5%	18	4%	15
2015	61%	198	9%	29	11%	35	14%	46	1%	3
2011	25%	81	21%	69	15%	47	35%	113	3%	11
2008	44%	151	26%	91	15%	52	8%	28	7%	23
2006	38%	145	32%	122	18%	68	8%	30	3%	13
2004	53%	170	12%	39	26%	84	6%	20	3%	10

Matapédia provincial election results
Year	CAQ		Liberal		QC solidaire		Parti Québécois	
2022	44%	106	17%	40	5%	13	23%	56
2018	8%	27	39%	133	9%	31	25%	84
2014	5%	17	67%	214	3%	10	23%	73
2012	13%	35	54%	147	5%	13	27%	73

== Notable people ==
- Jean-Eudes Dubé, lawyer and politician, born in 1926 in Matapédia;
- Maurice Harquail, politician, born in 1938 in Matapédia.

== See also ==
- List of anglophone communities in Quebec
- List of municipalities in Quebec
- Matapedia River
- Matapedia Valley
- Restigouche River
- Haute-Gaspésie—La Mitis—Matane—Matapédia
