= Bedford Subdivision =

Rail line in Nova Scotia

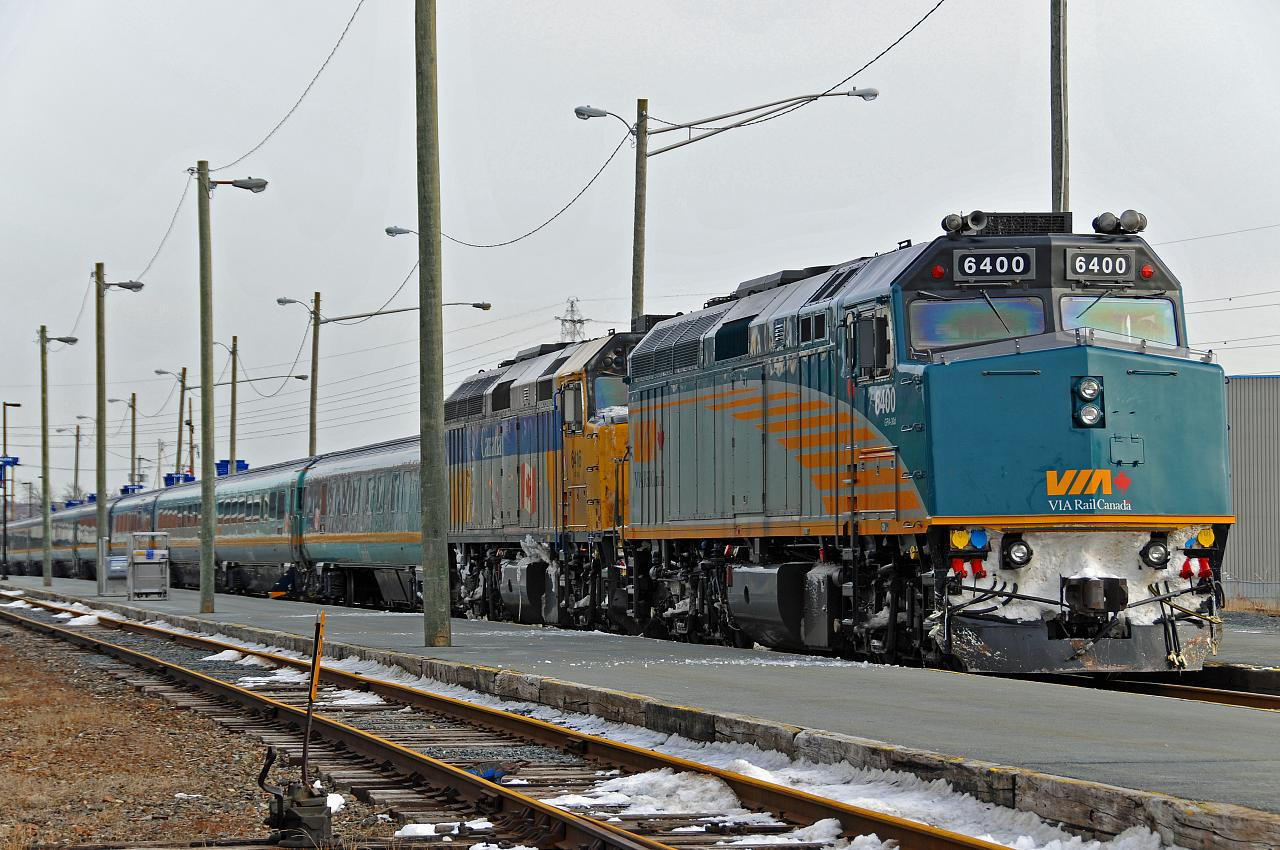
- The Ocean at the Via station in Halifax in 2008

Overview
- Status: Active
- Owner: Canadian National (CN)
- Locale: Central Nova Scotia
- Termini: Halifax; Truro
- Continues as: Springhill Subdivision
- Connecting lines: Dartmouth Subdivision

Service
- Type: Freight, passenger
- Services: Ocean
- Operator(s): Canadian National (freight); Via Rail (passenger)

History
- Opened: December 1858

Technical
- Line length: 64.0 mi (103.0 km)
- Number of tracks: 1
- Track gauge: 1,435 mm (4 ft 8 1/2 in) standard gauge
- Operating speed: 75 mph (121 km/h)
- Signalling: Centralized traffic control

Bedford Subdivision

The Bedford Subdivision is a railway line owned and operated by the Canadian National Railway (CN) in the Canadian province of Nova Scotia. It runs for 64.0 miles between Halifax and Truro. In Halifax, the line begins at the Halifax Ocean Terminal and the Halifax Via Rail station; past Truro, the line continues as the Springhill Subdivision. The line also connects with the Dartmouth Subdivision near Windsor Junction. The Ocean, a Via Rail intercity passenger train between Montreal and Halifax, runs along the length of the line in each direction three times a week, stopping only at Truro and Halifax.

== History ==
The tracks were first constructed as part of the Eastern Line of the Nova Scotia Railway (NSR), which connected Halifax and Pictou via Truro. The line opened in December 1858 along with the NSR's Windsor Branch, which ran from Halifax to Windsor; both were originally built in a broad gauge of 5 feet 6 inches (1,680 mm) but were re-gauged to standard gauge in 1875 during the construction of the line through to New Brunswick, Quebec, and points west.

In 1872, the NSR was dissolved by the Canadian government, who had controlled the railway since ownership had been passed from the Nova Scotia government five years prior. The line subsequently fell under control of the Intercolonial Railway (ICR), which used it for the eastern end of its mainline between Halifax and Quebec.

In 1918, the line, along with the rest of the ICR, was folded into the newly created CN Railways; it has remained under CN control ever since.

During World War II, after briefly considering double-tracking the entire route from Moncton to Halifax, CN installed Centralized Traffic Control (CTC) along the length of the Bedford and Springhill subdivisions. At the time, it was the largest single installation of CTC anywhere in North America, at almost 200 miles of track. Only the double-track sections around Truro and Halifax remained using Automatic Block Signaling (ABS).

Around 2000, CN removed all remaining true double-track on the line, along with any accompanying ABS signals. This included roughly 10 miles of track surrounding Truro, as well as almost 16 miles from Halifax out to Windsor Junction.

=== Accidents and incidents ===
==== 2001 Ocean derailment ====
At 2:24 pm on April 12, 2001, the westbound Ocean was travelling through Stewiacke at 48 miles per hour (77 kph) when it passed over an unlocked railway switch and derailed. The switch lock had been removed by a 13-year-old boy; after the two locomotives and first two cars had passed over the switch and down the main track, the rest of the train was diverted down an industrial track. Nine cars derailed, and the industrial track, dining car, and a farm supply store next to the tracks were destroyed. Of the 131 passengers and crew on board the train, 22 were hospitalized, of whom 9 were seriously injured.

==== 2008 Halifax train collision ====
At 6:37 pm on July 3, 2008, CN local train 519 was reversing towards the Halifax Ocean Terminal (HOT) when it collided with the Ocean on the curve around milepost 1.3 as it exited the loop track at HOT. The CN train consisted only of four locomotives, while the Via train consisted of two locomotives and 20 cars (longer than normal due to additional passenger traffic for Canada Day).

Both trains had been operating at restricted speed (15 mph) as required, and initiated emergency braking shortly after they saw each other; consequently at the time of the collision the CN and Via trains were travelling around 12 mph and 5 mph, respectively. As a result, there were no significant injuries; the two locomotives and first six cars of the Via train were nonetheless severely damaged (although they did not derail). An investigation from the Transportation Safety Board of Canada (TSB) found that even though restricted speed is normally sufficient to allow trains to stop within one-half the range of vision (and therefore avoid a collision), the restricted sightlines caused by the curve and surrounding rockface prevented the CN train from having the requisite stopping distance. The unusual circumstances of the Ocean's late arrival in Halifax (which led to it operating at the same time as the CN train) and extended length (which led to it switching further down the main track and around the curve than normal) also contributed to the collision.

==== Other significant incidents ====
On July 10, 1912, the Maritime Express, a scheduled passenger train travelling from Montreal to Halifax, apparently derailed in Grand Lake (approximately 23 miles from Halifax) due to a warped rail. The locomotive rolled down an embankment and into the lake, destroying the track and bringing a few cars with it. It is unclear how many passengers were harmed, if any; the engineer and fireman were apparently killed.

On October 9, 1999, eastbound CN train 106 derailed on the north main track in Bedford (milepost 9.7) due to a defective rail. The second locomotive and first eight cars were affected. No injury or significant damage (except that to the railcars) was reported.

On August 13, 2002, westbound CN train 137 derailed near Milford (milepost 38.85) due to a track buckle. The last two five-unit articulated cars were affected, and 2.85 miles of track was destroyed. The buckle was caused by a combination of unstable ballast and track stress as a result of high temperatures: at the time of the derailment, the ambient temperature was approximately 35°C, and the rail temperature was over 40°C. No injury or significant damage was reported.

On July 29, 2019, westbound CN train 407 was travelling through Oakfield (milepost 27.73) at 51 miles per hour (82 kph) when it collided with a vehicle at a private crossing. The vehicle had driven onto the crossing without stopping at the stop sign; the train struck the vehicle's passenger side and pushed it down an embankment where it overturned. The driver was seriously injured and was airlifted to a hospital, while the passenger sustained minor injuries. The train and its crew were not affected.

== Infrastructure ==
The entire line is single-tracked and equipped with Centralized Traffic Control (CTC). As of 2005, the maximum track speed was 75 mph, between Milford and Truro, and lower elsewhere.

Sidings are present along the line at the following places:

- Kinsac (milepost 20.0): 3,553 feet
- Sandy Cove (milepost 27.0): 3,800 feet
- Alton (milepost 51.2): 6,300 feet

Rockingham Yard, in Halifax, is CN's main yard in the area, and the point where both long-distance and local trains originate. In 2023, it was renamed Pace Yard in honor of the company's former chair of the Board of Directors, Robert L. Pace, who had retired the previous year. Additionally, container transloading operations in Halifax take place at the CN-owned Halifax Intermodal Terminal in Richmond, as well as at the South End Container Terminal (also called the Halifax Ocean Terminal) and Fairview Cove Terminal, both of which are owned and operated by PSA.

=== Traffic ===
Besides the Ocean, which runs three times a week, CN operates scheduled and as-needed freight trains over the line:

- 120/121 - Daily intermodals operating Toronto-Halifax and Halifax-Toronto, respectively.
- 122/123 - As-needed intermodals operating Chicago-Halifax and Halifax-Chicago, respectively.
- 407/408 - Daily manifests operating Dartmouth-Moncton and Moncton-Dartmouth, respectively.
- 701/703 (or 511?) - As-needed unit train carrying gypsum between National Gypsum's mine in Milford to its ship-loading facility at Wrights Cove, along the Dartmouth Subdivision.
- Various other locals running as-needed out of Truro or the Halifax/Dartmouth area.

== Route ==
Beginning in downtown Halifax, the line travels around the edge of the peninsula and through the nearly 10-kilometer-long Halifax Rail Cut before emerging by the CN yard in Rockingham. At Rockingham, the 2.4-mile Deepwater Branch branches off to the Halifax Intermodal Terminal in Halifax's North End. Continuing along the shore of the Bedford Basin, it passes Mill Cove before heading inland near Bedford. At Windsor Junction (milepost 15.7), shortly after passing under NS-102, the line meets the Dartmouth Subdivision coming from the east, as well as the now-abandoned Windsor & Hantsport Railway from the west. After Windsor Junction, it runs next to Kinsac Lake and Shubenacadie Grand Lake, passing through the community of Wellington before once again crossing NS-102 in Enfield. At milepost 36.6, in East Milford, a track branches off at a wye to the National Gypsum mine. After passing through Milford, the line roughly parallels NS-102, passing through Shubenacadie, Stewiacke, and Brookfield before entering Truro from the south. Just before the end of the subdivision at the Truro Via Rail station, a track branches off towards the Cape Breton and Central Nova Scotia Railway's (CB&CNS) Hopewell Subdivision and the Truro Yard, shared between CB&CNS and CN.
