= Newcastle Subdivision =

Rail line in New Brunswick

- The Ocean (seen from a Skyline dome car) near Miramichi in December 2008

Overview
- Status: Active
- Owner: Canadian National (CN); New Brunswick East Coast Railway (1998-2008)
- Locale: Eastern New Brunswick
- Termini: Pacific Junction (near Moncton); Campbellton
- Continues from: Springhill Subdivision
- Continues as: Mont-Joli Subdivision
- Connecting lines: Nepisiguit Subdivision (near Bathurst); Loggieville Spur (near Newcastle)

Service
- Type: Freight, passenger
- Operator(s): Canadian National (freight); Via Rail (passenger)

History
- Opened: 1875

Technical
- Line length: 219.4 mi (353.1 km)
- Num of tracks: 1
- Track gauge: 1,435 mm (4 ft 8 1/2 in) standard gauge
- Operating speed: 60 mph (97 km/h)
- Signalling: Occupancy Control System

Newcastle Subdivision

The Newcastle Subdivision is a railway line owned and operated by the Canadian National Railway (CN) in the Canadian province of New Brunswick. It runs approximately 173 miles between Pacific Junction/Catamount (near Moncton) and Campbellton. At Catamount, the line becomes the Springhill Subdivision, which runs on through Moncton and into Nova Scotia; in Campbellton, it continues as the Mont-Joli Subdivision across the Gaspé Peninsula and eastwards through Quebec. Two short branch lines connect with the subdivision: the Nepisiguit Subdivision, historically a branch to the Brunswick Mines, meets the line just south of Bathurst, and the Loggieville Spur, which runs west from near Newcastle into Chatham. The Ocean, a Via Rail intercity passenger train between Montreal and Halifax, runs along the length of the line in each direction three times a week, stopping at Rogersville, Miramichi, Bathurst, Petit Rocher, Jacquet River, Charlo, and Campbellton (with Petit Rocher, Jacquet River, and Charlo being flag stops).

== History ==
=== Construction and early years ===
While a rail connection between the Maritime provinces and the Province of Canada (modern-day Ontario and Quebec) had begun to be discussed in the 1840s, it took the American Civil War and the Confederation of Canada in 1867 to finally reach a lasting deal on the construction of such a railway. Upon Confederation, in the Constitution Act, 1867, a constitutional requirement was laid out for the federal government to build what would become the Intercolonial Railway (ICR) between Halifax and the St. Lawrence River valley.

The ICR was built in stages beginning in 1867; the section from Campbellton to Moncton was complete by 1875. That same year, the entire length of the railway, which had initially been built in a broad gauge of 5 feet 6 inches (1,680 mm), was re-gauged to standard gauge as part of a broader effort across Canada to integrate the network with the standard-gauge network in use in the United States.

Shortly after construction, a number of branch lines were built to connect various communities and mines not reached by the original ICR mainline. Three major lines remained active into the 21st century:

- The 7-mile Dalhousie Branch was constructed in 1884 from Dalhousie Junction eastwards to serve the town of Dalhousie. The branch remained operational until the closure of the paper mill and power plant in Dalhousie in the late 2000s/early 2010s.
- The Nepisiguit Subdivision was originally built by the Northern New Brunswick and Seaboard Railway around 1910, stretching around 17 miles up the Nepisiguit River valley to the Bathurst Mines. This line only operated until around 1918, and the remaining rails were lifted in 1959; however, in 1963 CN constructed a new branch (partially along the old route) to serve the Brunswick #12 zinc mine. This line was operated by CN and the NBEC until the mine closed in April 2013; with the mine closure, the 14-mile line was subsequently reduced to 9 miles, where the track now ends at a lumber mill.
- The Loggieville Spur runs from the Newcastle Subdivision at Nelson Junction east to Chatham. It was built in 1876 by the Chatham Branch Railway, which was bought first by the Canada Eastern Railway in 1890 and then by the ICR in 1904/5. The 4-mile section from Chatham to Loggieville, built as an extension in 1894, was abandoned by CN in 1984, but the remaining roughly 8.5 miles are still in use today.

In 1918, the ICR as a whole, along with the National Transcontinental Railway (NTR), the Canadian Northern Railway (CNoR), and eventually the Grand Trunk Railway (GTR), was folded into the nationalized railway system under the newly created Canadian National Railways (CNR). The line remained relatively unchanged into the latter half of the twentieth century; even following the discontinuance of some of CN's flagship passenger trains such as the Maritime Express in the 1960s and 70s, it retained both passenger (with the Ocean) and local freight service. At some point between 1963 and 1974, the Newcastle Subdivision as it exists (administratively) today was formed, as CN consolidated the Bathurst (Campbellton to Newcastle) and Harcourt (Newcastle to Catamount) subdivisions.

=== New Brunswick East Coast Railway (1998-2008) ===
As part of its privatization process in 1995, CN began to aggressively rationalize its network, shedding dozens of branch lines that it deemed marginally effective, unprofitable, or unnecessary. Many of these lines fell under the control of various newly-formed shortline railroads and holding companies; in New Brunswick and eastern Quebec, many regional lines became part of the Quebec Railway Corporation (QRC). In early 1998, the Newcastle Subdivision, as well as almost all of its spurs and branch lines, was taken over by the New Brunswick East Coast Railway (NBEC), a subsidiary of the QRC. The NBEC served the line much as CN had previously, moving freight from regional industries to the broader CN network. However, it continued to operate the line without making any significant investments to the infrastructure, and a considerable amount of maintenance was deferred, especially on the section south of Bathurst.

On November 3rd, 2008, CN announced that it was buying back the NBEC from the QRC along with three other subsidiaries as part of a CA$49.8 million deal. With this purchase, as well as the purchase of the Chemin de fer de la Matapédia et du Golfe (CFMG) and its trackage from Rivière-du-Loup to Campbellton, the entirety of the old ICR mainline came back under CN control. The railroad said that the lines had become economically viable since the 1998 sale, and that infrastructure and locomotive fleet upgrades would be made.

=== Post-CN reacquisition (2008-present) ===
CN's apparent renewed interest in the NBEC's trackage came at somewhat of an odd time, as by all indications the line did not have much potential for growth or increased traffic. Indeed, it was at this time when many of the major rail-served industries in eastern New Brunswick were beginning to shut down, and upon the final closure of the Brunswick Mines in 2013, Via Rail and the Ocean effectively became the line's biggest customers. By 2012, just four years after purchasing the line, CN had begun to consider abandoning it, a case strengthened by freight traffic dwindling to only about 12-15 smaller customers; additionally, the Ocean's service was halved in October of that year, further reducing the income CN received.

By August 2012, CN determined that up to $50 million in investments to the subdivision would be necessary to maintain service, a figure that the railway deemed too high to justify given the low traffic volumes over the line. As such, it entered into the federally-regulated rail line discontinuance process, slating the 139 miles of the line south of Bathurst for formal cessation of operations as soon as March 2014, pending any agreement with the provincial government and local customers to provide the funding necessary to maintain service.

While negotiations initially stalled, New Brunswick and CN eventually reached a deal in January of 2014 to maintain the line on the northern and southern sections, from Nelson Junction southwards and from Nepisiguit Junction north to Belledune, for the next 15 years. The province would contribute $25 million of the needed funding, with CN supplying the rest. However, the lack of any freight customers on the 44-mile middle section of the line not covered by the provincial deal (roughly between Bathurst and Miramichi) led CN to continue the discontinuance process for this section. By law, a five-month window for investment or sale negotiations was required before the railway could complete the process; in May, four months after the provincial agreement, the federal government (through Via Rail) announced a separate agreement to provide around $10.2 million for upkeep of the threatened middle section, preserving the entire length of the subdivision from discontinuance and enabling the Ocean to continue running.

The pair of agreements in 2014 saved the line, albeit temporarily, but were limited to upkeep and didn't provide for anything in the way of improvements. Despite the funding, track conditions continued to deteriorate, and over the next few years CN imposed more and more slow orders on various parts of the subdivision. Segments of track that had once supported 60 miles per hour (mph) speeds were limited to 30 mph or less, forcing Via to add significant extra time to the Ocean's schedule amidst a battle between CN's relative uninterest in the line's upkeep and Via's unwillingness to fund major infrastructure improvements. As of June 2024, the Ocean was unable to run faster than 30 mph on large stretches east of Campbellton, between Bathurst and Miramichi, and elsewhere. In 2029, the fifteen-year funding deals are also set to expire, which will likely result in a new period of uncertainty over the line's future.

== Infrastructure ==
The entire line is single-tracked and is unsignalled dark territory, meaning train movement authority is governed by track warrants, specifically the Occupancy Control System (OCS) used across Canada. Track speeds on the line vary widely due to the slow orders imposed by CN; the maximum speed anywhere on the line is 60 mph, but trains are frequently limited to 30 mph or less for over half of the line.

Individual sidings are present along the line at the following places:

- Catamount (milepost 0.8): 4,150 feet
- Birch Ridge (milepost 11.7): 3,800 feet
- Bartibog (milepost 86.9): 6,100 feet
- Beresford (milepost 116.6): 2,400 feet
- Petit Rocher (milepost 121.6): 3,550 feet
- Irvco/Belledune (milepost 132.1): 5,930 feet
- Dalhousie Junction (milepost 163.8): 3,600 feet

Former sidings at Kent Junction, Lakeland, Beaver Brook, and Charlo have been partially or fully removed since 2003. There are also small yards in Miramichi, Bathurst, and a larger one in Campbellton, where much of CN's operations in the area are based.

=== Traffic ===
CN does not run any regularly scheduled through freight trains on the line. Aside from the Ocean, the line is served by at least one local train, 569, a Mon-Sat local turn running north from Moncton, usually to Miramichi and the Loggieville Spur.
