= Springhill Subdivision =

Rail line in Nova Scotia and New Brunswick

- Rail bridge over the Tantramar River in Sackville

Overview
- Status: Active
- Owner: Canadian National (CN)
- Locale: Central Nova Scotia; Southwestern New Brunswick
- Termini: Truro; Pacific Junction (near Moncton)
- Continues from: Bedford Subdivision
- Continues as: Napadogan Subdivision; Newcastle Subdivision
- Connecting lines: Sussex Subdivision (in Moncton); CB&CNS Hopewell Subdivision (in Truro)

Service
- Type: Freight, passenger
- Services: Ocean
- Operator(s): Canadian National (freight); Via Rail (passenger)

History
- Opened: November 1872

Technical
- Line length: 138.4 mi (222.7 km)
- Num of tracks: 1
- Track gauge: 1,435 mm (4 ft 8 1/2 in) standard gauge
- Operating speed: 70 mph (110 km/h)
- Signalling: Centralized traffic control

Springhill Subdivision

The Springhill Subdivision is a railway line owned and operated by the Canadian National Railway (CN) in the Canadian provinces of Nova Scotia and New Brunswick. It runs for approximately 138 miles between Truro in Nova Scotia and Pacific Junction/Catamount near Moncton, New Brunswick. In Truro, the line continues as the Bedford Subdivision towards Halifax; a separate line, the Cape Breton and Central Nova Scotia Railway's (CB&CNS) Hopewell Subdivision, branches off towards New Glasgow and points east. At Pacific Junction, it splits into two lines: the CN mainline as the Napadogan Subdivision, which runs towards Edmundston, New Brunswick, and the Newcastle Subdivision, which goes north along the New Brunswick coast towards Miramichi and Campbellton. The Ocean, a Via Rail intercity passenger train between Montreal and Halifax, runs along the length of the line in each direction three times a week, stopping at Moncton, Sackville, Amherst, Springhill Junction (as a flag stop), and Truro.

== History ==
The tracks from Truro to Moncton were first constructed by the then-newly formed Intercolonial Railway (ICR) and opened in November 1872. It was initially built in a broad gauge of 5 feet 6 inches (1,680 mm), but was re-gauged to standard gauge in 1875, before construction on the rest of the line through New Brunswick was fully complete.

In 1918, the ICR, and the line with it, was folded into the nationalized railway system under the newly created CN Railways. It has remained in the hands of CN (which was privatized in 1995) ever since.

From the line's creation until some point between 1992 and 2005, the subdivision only extended as far as downtown Moncton. Before then, the Gort Subdivision (from which Gort Junction, the entrance to Gordon Yard from the subdivision, takes its name) covered the remaining 13.5 miles to Pacific Junction and Catamount.

In August 2001, the segment of double-track between Moncton and Painsec Junction was reduced to single-track. Around the same time, another double-track segment, between Belmont and Truro, was also reduced to single track. Sidings remain in both places.

Around 2022, CN apparently removed all of the searchlight signals on roughly 45 miles of the line between Truro and Oxford Junction and replaced them with hooded vertical color light signals. Additional intermediate signals, the same vertical color lights, were also added in between the existing signal locations. The reason for this upgrade is unclear.

In 2023, a brand-new $100-million inland port known as ScotiaPort was proposed to alleviate truck congestion in and around the Port of Halifax. The complex would be built next to the rail line in Onslow, near the interchange between NS-102 and NS-104 just north of Truro. It would be developed by a partnership between the Millbrook First Nation and the transportation logistics company Canadian Rail Equipment Works and Services (CREWS). It is projected to bring approximately 300 jobs to the area.

=== 2016 fatal pedestrian collision ===
At 1:43 am on July 27, 2016, CN train 121, the daily westbound intermodal, struck and killed a pedestrian in a motorized wheelchair at the Robinson Street grade crossing in downtown Moncton. The train consisted of 3 locomotives and 187 railcars, and was traveling at approximately 30 mph. An investigation by the Transportation Safety Board of Canada determined that the wheelchair had become stuck in the rail ballast due to a gap in the asphalt along the outer edge of the sidewalk. The crossing had been recently repaved (which was when the gap was created) and did not yet have new reflective paint delineating the edges of the sidewalk; in the darkness of the night, the pedestrian had been using the outer edge of the sidewalk as a visual guide, and the wheelchair consequently fell into the gap. No issues were found in the actions of the train crew or in the condition of the train itself. The pedestrian's family later filed a lawsuit against CN, which reached a settlement in October 2019. Earlier that same year, the Canadian government announced plans to spend $1 million on rail safety upgrades in Moncton, including at the crossing where the accident occurred.

== Infrastructure ==
The entire line is single-tracked and equipped with Centralized traffic control (CTC). As of 2005, the maximum mainline track speed was 70 mph, and lower on most sections of the route.

Administratively, the line technically extends northwards past Pacific Junction just under two miles (to roughly milepost 138.4) to Catamount, where the Newcastle Subdivision officially begins; however, the area is generally referred to as Pacific Junction, and CN timetables for the subdivision do not mention Catamount at all.

Sidings are still present along the line at the following places:

- Belmont (milepost 4.8): 15,340 feet
- Folly Lake (milepost 24.0): 7,150 feet
- Oxford Junction (milepost 46.7): 6,360 feet
- Springhill Junction (milepost 59.5): 11,350 feet
- Amherst (milepost 76.8): 8,785 feet
- Evans (milepost 92.7): 8,810 feet
- Painsec Junction (milepost 117.5): 9,240 feet
- Lutesville (milepost 131.8): 5,910 feet

Gordon Yard, CN's main rail yard in New Brunswick, is located along the subdivision just west of Moncton. It acts as the company's base of operations in the region. Any trains originating or terminating in Moncton do so here; through freights also stop outside the yard to crew change.

An additional yard remains operational just east of the line in Truro, along the CB&CNS mainline to Havre Boucher. It is used as an interchange between CB&CNS and CN. At its widest, the yard is 13 tracks wide, with connecting tracks (via a wye) to both the Bedford and Springhill subdivisions. The two northernmost tracks are used by CB&CNS, while the rest are used by CN.

=== Traffic ===
Besides the passenger Ocean, which runs three times a week, CN operates scheduled and as-needed freight trains over some or all of the line:

- 120/121 - Daily intermodals operating Toronto-Halifax and Halifax-Toronto, respectively.
- 122/123 - As-needed intermodals operating Chicago-Halifax and Halifax-Chicago, respectively.
- 305/306 - Daily manifests operating Moncton-Toronto and Toronto-Moncton, respectively.
- 407/408 - Daily manifests operating Dartmouth-Moncton and Moncton-Dartmouth, respectively.
- Various locals, running east from Moncton or west from Truro.
