= Napadogan Subdivision =

Rail line in New Brunswick

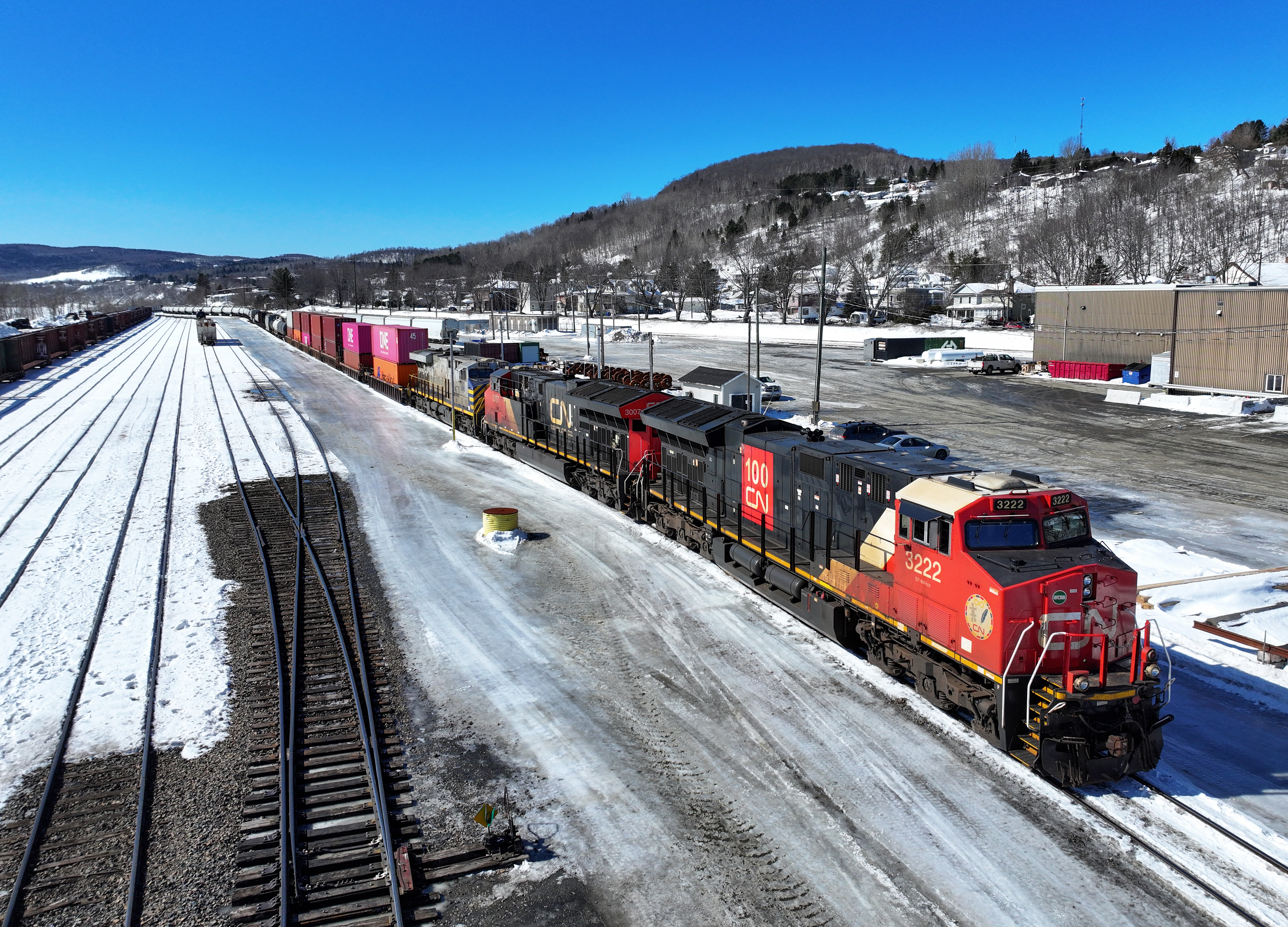
- A CN manifest train in the yard in Edmundston

Overview
- Status: Active
- Owner: Canadian National (CN)
- Locale: Central New Brunswick
- Termini: Pacific Junction (near Moncton); Edmundston
- Continues from: Springhill Subdivision
- Continues as: Pelletier Subdivision
- Connecting lines: Newcastle Subdivision; Maine Northern Railway

Service
- Type: Freight
- Operator: Canadian National

History
- Opened: c. 1909

Technical
- Line length: 219.4 mi (353.1 km)
- Num of tracks: 1
- Track gauge: 1,435 mm (4 ft 8 1/2 in) standard gauge
- Operating speed: 65 mph (105 km/h)
- Signalling: Centralized traffic control

Napadogan Subdivision

The Napadogan Subdivision is a railway line owned and operated by the Canadian National Railway (CN) in the Canadian province of New Brunswick. It runs approximately 220 miles (350 km) between Pacific Junction (near Moncton) and Edmundston. At Pacific Junction, the line meets the Newcastle Subdivision from the north and becomes the Springhill Subdivision, which continues on through Moncton and into Nova Scotia; in Edmundston, it continues as the Pelletier Subdivision towards the St. Lawrence River, Quebec, and points west. There is no passenger rail traffic on the line, as Via Rail's Ocean takes the less direct but more heavily populated route along the New Brunswick coast.

== History ==
By the early 1900s, the Canadian government began to negotiate with the Grand Trunk Railway (GTR) around the potential construction of a second transcontinental rail line, one that would serve a parallel purpose to the Canadian Pacific Railway (CPR) line between Vancouver and Saint John that had been completed roughly two decades prior. The government wished to create a route that avoided the potential political and economic complications of the CPR's tracks, which ran through the United States in Maine, as well as meet the rapidly growing traffic demands on the CPR and open up more remote areas to development. The eastern portion of the line, from Winnipeg to Moncton (where it would connect with the line built in the 1870s by the Intercolonial Railway), was to be constructed and owned entirely by the Canadian government.

In 1903, the National Transcontinental Railway (NTR) was formed through legislation to complete the eastern section; surveying commenced in 1905 and the line was constructed over the following eight years, with the final spike driven in Grant, Ontario in November 1913; the first passenger services had already begun to run on completed sections of the line beginning in October 1909. The line was built to relatively very high construction standards, with much effort put in to keep the grades and curvature to a minimum. As a result, many sizable bridges were also constructed, including the Little Salmon River Trestle (finished in 1911) south of Grand Falls, which would become the second-largest railway bridge in Canada.

=== Nationalization and subsequent mergers ===
At the same time as the construction of the NTR was progressing, the Canadian Northern Railway (CNoR) had built what was effectively a third transcontinental line between Vancouver and Quebec City. Large sections of the GTR/NTR route, despite being new and well-constructed, proved to be somewhat redundant, with the parts through remote northern Ontario also generating very little traffic. In 1915, just two years after construction was completed, the GTR reneged on its operating deal with the government, and the NTR (along with the ICR and numerous other smaller lines) was folded into the Canadian Government Railways (CGR). The CNoR was also battling financial troubles of its own, and on December 20, 1918, the government created Canadian National Railways (CNR, soon to become CN) to manage both the CGR and CNoR, with the GTR also being brought into the fold after arbitration in 1923.

The line west from Moncton became CN's main freight corridor, as it provided a more direct route through New Brunswick from Quebec than the coastal ICR trackage. The ICR line, however, retained most of CN's flagship passenger trains (except for the occasional detour), as it ran through many of the major population centers of Gaspé and northern New Brunswick.

Centralized traffic control (CTC) was installed on the subdivision in 1941 as part of a broader World War II effort to install signalling along the length of the mainline.

==== Pelletier cutoff ====
After the formation of CN in 1918, the subdivision remained mostly unchanged until 1976, when CN finished construction on the Pelletier Cutoff, 19 miles of track connecting the Montmagny Subdivision (along the former ICR line) at St-André Junction with the Monk Subdivision (the section of the NTR line from Edmundston to Quebec City) at the namesake town of Pelletier, Quebec. This increased efficiency greatly, as it allowed trains to bypass the steep grades and tight curves of the Monk Subdivision in favor of the straight, flat route along the St. Lawrence. It also took even more through traffic off of the former ICR line, with CN eventually (temporarily, as it turned out) selling much of the roughly 360-mile segment between Rivière-du-Loup and Moncton to various shortline railroads in the 1990s, a process which only accelerating after privatization in 1995. The coastal line was effectively relegated to secondary status, which has been reflected in CN's sluggish or nonexistent maintenance of it in the decades since.

The construction of the Pelletier Cutoff had ripple effects on the Napadogan Subdivision; besides a slight increase in traffic, a number of infrastructure upgrades took place over the following decades. Tracks along the entire route were rebuilt as continuous welded rail, and the CTC signalling system was adjusted to accommodate the new trackage.

== Infrastructure ==
The entire line is single-tracked and equipped with Centralized traffic control (CTC). As of 2005, the maximum mainline track speed was 65 mph, with a majority of the route being capped at 60 mph or lower.

Sidings are present along the line at the following places:

- North Branch (milepost 12.6): 6,295 feet
- Pangburn (milepost 29.4): 6,995 feet
- Chipman (milepost 45.8): 6,400 feet
- Cantor (milepost 55.4): 8,680 feet
- Bantalor (milepost 69.7): 6,300 feet
- McGivney (milepost 85.5): 7,425 feet
- Napadogan (milepost 106.6): 8,000 feet
- Deersdale (milepost 114.9): 5,140 feet
- Juniper (milepost 122.6): 6,645 feet
- Summit (milepost 135.2): 6,970 feet
- Longley (milepost 148.7): 6,000 feet
- Ennishore (milepost 175.0): 7,125 feet
- Grand Falls (milepost 182.5): 5,080 feet
- St. Leonard (milepost 194.1): 9,215 feet
- Green River (milepost 210.0): 6,330 feet

Gordon Yard, CN's main rail yard in New Brunswick, is located just east of Pacific Junction on the Springhill Subdivision. Additionally, CN operates a smaller regional yard at the other end of the subdivision, in Edmundston; local trains serve the line from these points. Through freight trains crew change at both yards, and often stop to work in at least Moncton, if not both.

There are several wyes and spurs along the line used to serve customers, including in Edmundston, St. Leonard, and Chipman. In St. Leonard, a single-track bridge across the Saint John River connects the subdivision with Van Buren, Maine and provides an interchange point with the Maine Northern Railway.

=== Traffic ===
CN operates both regularly scheduled and as-needed freight service over the entirety or portions of the line:

- 120/121 - Daily intermodals operating Toronto-Halifax and Halifax-Toronto, respectively.
- 122/123 - As-needed intermodals operating Chicago-Halifax and Halifax-Chicago, respectively.
- 305/306 - Daily manifests operating Moncton-Toronto and Toronto-Moncton, respectively.
- 535 - Weekday local turn running west from Moncton, usually to Chipman, or as far as Juniper.
- 578 - Weekday local turn running east from Edmundston, usually to Grand Falls, Longley, or even Chipman.
