= Dartmouth Subdivision =

Rail line in Nova Scotia

- CN equipment in the Dartmouth yard

Overview
- Status: Active
- Owner: Canadian National (CN)
- Locale: Halifax, Nova Scotia
- Termini: Windsor Junction; Shearwater (just east of Dartmouth)
- Connecting lines: Bedford Subdivision

Service
- Type: Freight
- Operator: Canadian National

History
- Opened: c. 1888

Technical
- Line length: 16.3 mi (26.2 km)
- Number of tracks: 1
- Track gauge: 1,435 mm (4 ft 8 1/2 in) standard gauge
- Operating speed: 30 mph (48 km/h)
- Signalling: Occupancy Control System

The Dartmouth Subdivision is a railway line owned and operated by the Canadian National Railway (CN) in the Canadian province of Nova Scotia. It runs for roughly 16.5 miles between Windsor Junction and Shearwater, mainly along the shore of the Bedford Basin and Halifax Harbour through downtown Dartmouth. At Windsor Junction, the line merges with the Bedford Subdivision, which runs south to Halifax and north to Truro.

== History ==
A railway line to Dartmouth, along with passenger service to Halifax, can be found in Intercolonial Railway (ICR) timetables as early as the winter of 1888–9. After many failed attempts, the government awarded contracts to build a line past Dartmouth beginning in 1911; the new line stretched over 80 miles past Windsor Junction, 60 miles past the previous end of track in Dartmouth. Past Dartmouth, the new route ran along the Atlantic coast, before bending inland to Musquodoboit Harbour. From there, it followed the Musquodoboit River to the end of track in Upper Musquodoboit. Construction of the extended line was complete by 1916.

Passenger service on the extended line commenced shortly after it opened; by 1919, CN (the ICR's eventual successor) offered both passenger and mixed service that combined to serve the entire line from Windsor Junction to Upper Musquodoboit daily, except on Sundays.

It is unclear exactly when passenger service on the line ended, though by 1968 just two weekday freight trains remained on the schedule, operating only as far as Dartmouth. In the 1980s, the line was officially shortened for the first time, only running to the now-defunct Ultramar (former Texaco) refinery at milepost 18.5, with a spur (milepost 16.5) to the Autoport vehicle processing facility.

In the 1990s, the subdivision was shortened again to the Imperoyal refinery in Shearwater, where it ends now. Shortly after, all track beyond Shearwater (besides the Autoport spur) was removed. Most of the former right-of-way was converted into rail trails beginning in 1998; the section from Shearwater to Meaghers Grant is now part of the Trans Canada Trail network.

At 9:56 am on February 15, 2002, a CN train derailed while switching in the yard in Dartmouth. Three tank cars (two carrying propane and one carrying butane) and two automobile-carrying flatcars derailed; a tank car and a flatcar fell on their side along the edge of the harbour. None of the cars leaked and no injuries were reported. As a precautionary measure, 800 Dartmouth residents were evacuated from their homes, and the Macdonald Bridge was closed for 12 hours. The incident was determined to have been caused by equipment defects on one of the tank cars and deteriorated ties: due to its defects the car forced the rails apart enough that one of the wheels fell in between the rails, causing the derailment.

== Infrastructure ==
The entire line is operated under Occupancy Control System (OCS) control. From Tufts Cove to the end of track in Shearwater, trains must follow CROR Rule 105, operating mostly at restricted speed. Speed is therefore limited to a maximum of 30 mph, and lower in downtown Dartmouth and over most grade crossings.

There are no sidings along the line; however, there is one small yard, located along Shore Road in downtown Dartmouth. Three short industrial spurs serve the Burnside Industrial Park around milepost 8.5, and another serves the National Gypsum ship-loading facility at Wrights Cove (milepost 10.1). Other customers include the Imperoyal refinery and the Autoport, both located in Shearwater.

=== Traffic ===
There are currently no passenger trains operating anywhere on the line. CN operates a few scheduled or as-needed freight trains:

- 407/408 - Daily manifests operating Dartmouth-Moncton and Moncton-Dartmouth, respectively.
- 701/703 - As-needed unit train carrying gypsum between National Gypsum's mine in Milford to its ship-loading facility at Wrights Cove.
- Two as-needed locals - one serving the Burnside Industrial Park, and the other serving the Autoport.
