= Milford, Nova Scotia =

Milford, Nova Scotia may refer to one of the following communities in Nova Scotia, Canada:

- Milford (Annapolis), Nova Scotia, in Annapolis County
- Milford (Halifax), Nova Scotia, in the Halifax Regional Municipality and Hants County
- East Milford, Nova Scotia, in the Halifax Regional Municipality
- Milford Station, Nova Scotia, in the East Hants municipal district
