= CFMG =

CFMG can mean several different things:

- CFMG-FM a radio station in Alberta.
- Chemin de fer de la Matapédia et du Golfe a historic railway in Quebec that had the reporting mark CFMG.
