= Windsor station (Nova Scotia) =

Railway station in Nova Scotia, Canada

Windsor, Nova Scotia railway station

General information
- Location: 2 Water Street, Windsor, Nova Scotia; Canada
- Coordinates: 44°59′51″N 64°08′16″W
- Owner: Windsor and Hantsport Railway
Location

Windsor station in Windsor, Nova Scotia, Canada, was owned by the Windsor and Hantsport Railway. The station was demolished on June 3, 2026 after a fire occurred inside the abandoned station. The prefabricated metal structure replaced an earlier station building when the railway line's route through Windsor was changed in the 1970s.

== History ==
Windsor's first station was a large covered platform station built by the Nova Scotia Railway in 1858. It was replaced by a wooden gambrel roof station constructed by the Intercolonial Railway in 1881. A brick station was constructed in 1905 and the wooden station was relegated to freight duties. The brick station was demolished in 1970 and replaced by the current structure.
