= Ottawa Central Railway =

Defunct Canadian railroad company

Coordinates: 45°21′58″N 75°38′57″W

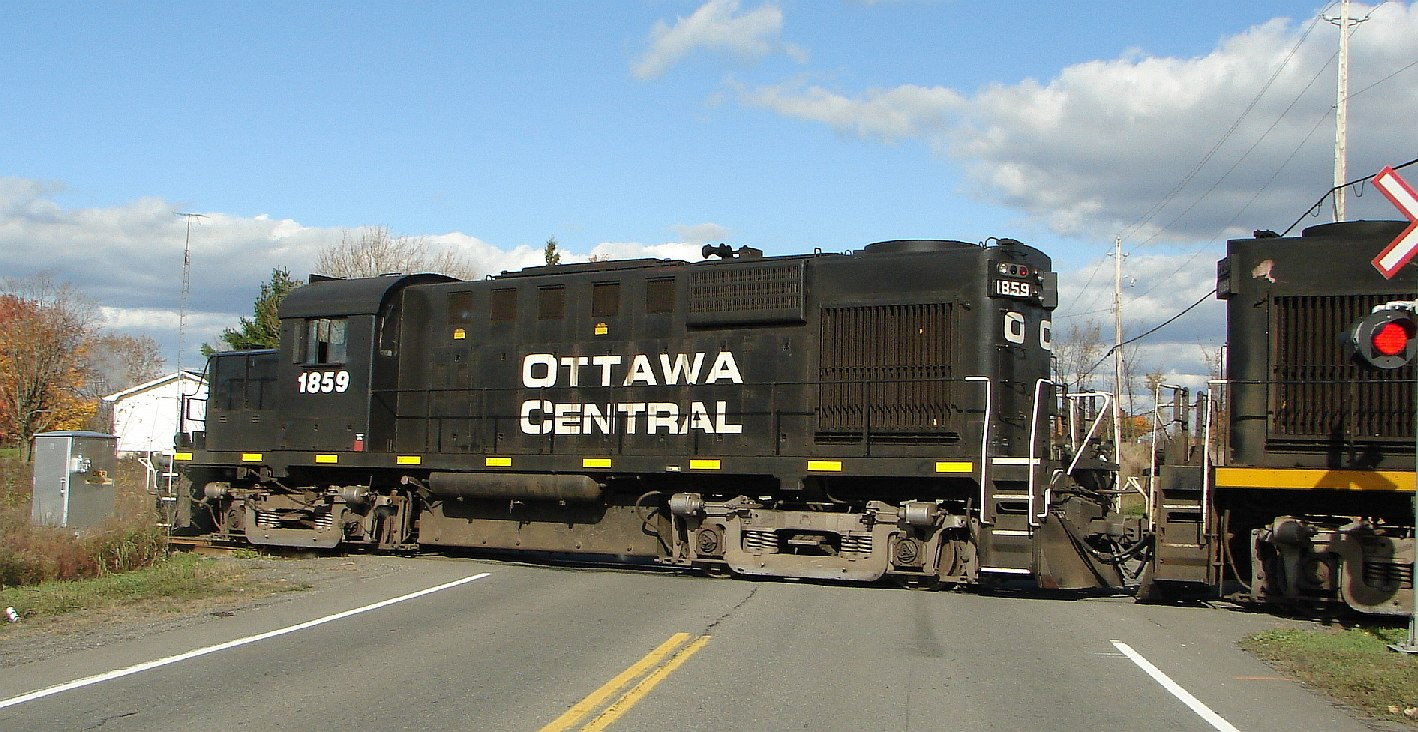

Overview
- Headquarters: Ottawa, Ontario, Canada
- Reporting mark: OCRR
- Locale: Eastern Ontario
- Dates of operation: 1998–2008
- Predecessor: Canadian National Railway
- Successor: Canadian National Railway

Technical
- Track gauge: 4 ft 8 1/2 in (1,435 mm) standard gauge
- Length: 123 mi (198 km)

The Ottawa Central Railway (reporting mark OCRR) was a Canadian short-line railroad subsidiary of the Canadian National Railway. The headquarters were at the Walkley Yard, 3141 Albion Road South, Ottawa, Ontario, Canada.

The OCRR was a wholly owned subsidiary of the Quebec Railway Corporation (QCR). It consisted of former CN subdivisions, and operated between Coteau-du-Lac, Quebec, at an interchange with the CN Montreal-Toronto main line, to Ottawa and Pembroke, Ontario.

The OCRR started operations on December 13, 1998, and two years later, QRC acquired the assets of Ontario L'Orignal Railway from RailAmerica.

The OCRR consisted of 198 km (123 mi) of track and spurs: 156 km (97 mi) of main line between Ottawa and Pembroke, on CN Beachburg Subdivision and 42 km (26 mi) of the former Ontario L’Orignal Railway (OLO) between Glen Robertson and Hawkesbury. It also had 138 km (86 mi) of running rights between Ottawa and Coteau on track owned by Via Rail.

Major commodities carried by the OCRR included newsprint, salt, medium-density fibreboard, linerboard, forest products, pulp, gasoline, lumber and board, wire rod, billets and scrap.

== CN purchase ==
On November 3, 2008, Canadian National Railway announced that it was purchasing the OCRR and its sister companies Chemin de fer de la Matapédia et du Golfe (CFMG), Compagnie de gestion de Matane (COGEMA), and the New Brunswick East Coast Railway (NBEC) for $49.8 million (CAD) from the Quebec Railway Corporation.

The CN announcement indicated that the reacquired rail lines will be integrated back into the CN network with no significant changes, other than introducing CN locomotives and rolling stock to train operations. CN also mentioned investing significant capital upgrades in the rail network for outstanding maintenance.
