= WHRC =

WHRC may refer to:

- Windsor and Hantsport Railway (reporting mark WHRC)
- WHRC-LP, a low-power radio station (97.3 FM) licensed to Chippewa Falls, Wisconsin, United States
- WHRC, the student radio program of Haverford College and Bryn Mawr College, founded in 1923
- Women's Human Rights Campaign, a British organisation that opposes transgender rights
