= Pacific Junction =

Pacific Junction may refer to:

- Pacific Junction, Iowa, USA
- Pacific Junction, New Brunswick, located in Westmorland County, New Brunswick, Canada

== See also ==
- Northern and Pacific Junction Railway, a railway company now part of the Canadian National Railway Company
