= New Brunswick East Coast Railway =

Historic Canadian railway

Overview
- Headquarters: Campbellton
- Reporting mark: NBEC
- Locale: New Brunswick, Canada
- Dates of operation: 1998–2008
- Successor: Canadian National Railway

Technical
- Track gauge: 4 ft 8 1/2 in (1,435 mm) standard gauge

The New Brunswick East Coast Railway (reporting mark NBEC) was a railway that operated in the Canadian province of New Brunswick.

It included 311 mi (501 km) of track of which 196 miles (315 km) were mainline between Campbellton and Pacific Junction near Moncton. Important spurs connected Dalhousie Junction and Dalhousie, Nepisiguit Junction and Brunswick Mines, and Nelson with Chatham.

The mainline (and related spurs) was formerly Canadian National Railway's second mainline between Montreal and Moncton. Its entire route was built originally as the Intercolonial Railway of Canada. Established 19 January 1998, NBEC actually started operations in December 1997 and was a wholly owned subsidiary of the Société des chemins de fer du Québec (Quebec Railway Corporation).

Via Rail's Montreal-Halifax passenger train, the Ocean, operates along the entire length of the NBEC's Newcastle Subdivision.

== CN purchase ==
On 3 November 2008 CN announced that it was purchasing the NBEC and its sister companies Chemin de fer de la Matapédia et du Golfe (CFMG), Compagnie de gestion de Matane (COGEMA), and the Ottawa Central Railway (OCR) for $49.8 million (CAD) from the Quebec Railway Corporation.

The CN announcement indicates that the reacquired rail lines will be integrated back into the CN network with no significant changes, other than introducing CN locomotives and rolling stock to train operations. CN also mentioned investing significant capital upgrades in the rail network for outstanding maintenance.

== See also ==
- Quebec Railway Corporation
