= Sydney station (Canada) =

Railway station in Nova Scotia, Canada

General information
- Location: Dodd Street, Sydney, Nova Scotia, Canada
- Coordinates: 46.1407°N 60.1897°W
- Owner: originally Canadian National Railway

History
- Opened: 1971
- Closed: 1990

Former services
Preceding station	Canadian National Railway	Following station
Sydney River toward Truro	Truro – Sydney	Terminus
Location

Sydney was a railway station in Sydney, Nova Scotia, Canada.

The building was originally owned by Canadian National Railway and later used by Via Rail Canada until the discontinuance of passenger train service to Sydney in 1990. The property was later owned by a numbered company, 3046975 Nova Scotia Ltd., which is controlled by Patrick Donovan, a real estate developer.

The station building was demolished on October 31, 2020. The property is now owned by Somerled Properties and DORA Construction owner Donald MacDonald.
