= Windsor Junction, Nova Scotia =

Community in Nova Scotia, Canada

Windsor Junction
- Suburban Community
- Location within Nova Scotia
- Country: Canada
- Province: Nova Scotia
- Municipality: Halifax Regional Municipality
- Community council: Halifax Regional Community Council
- Postal code: B2T
- Area code: 782, 902

Windsor Junction is a suburban community in Halifax Regional Municipality, Nova Scotia, Canada. It is located approximately 22 km (14 mi) north west of Downtown Halifax and approximately 3 km (1.9 mi) north of the Bedford Basin near the communities of Fall River, Lower Sackville, and Waverley.

== Railway history ==
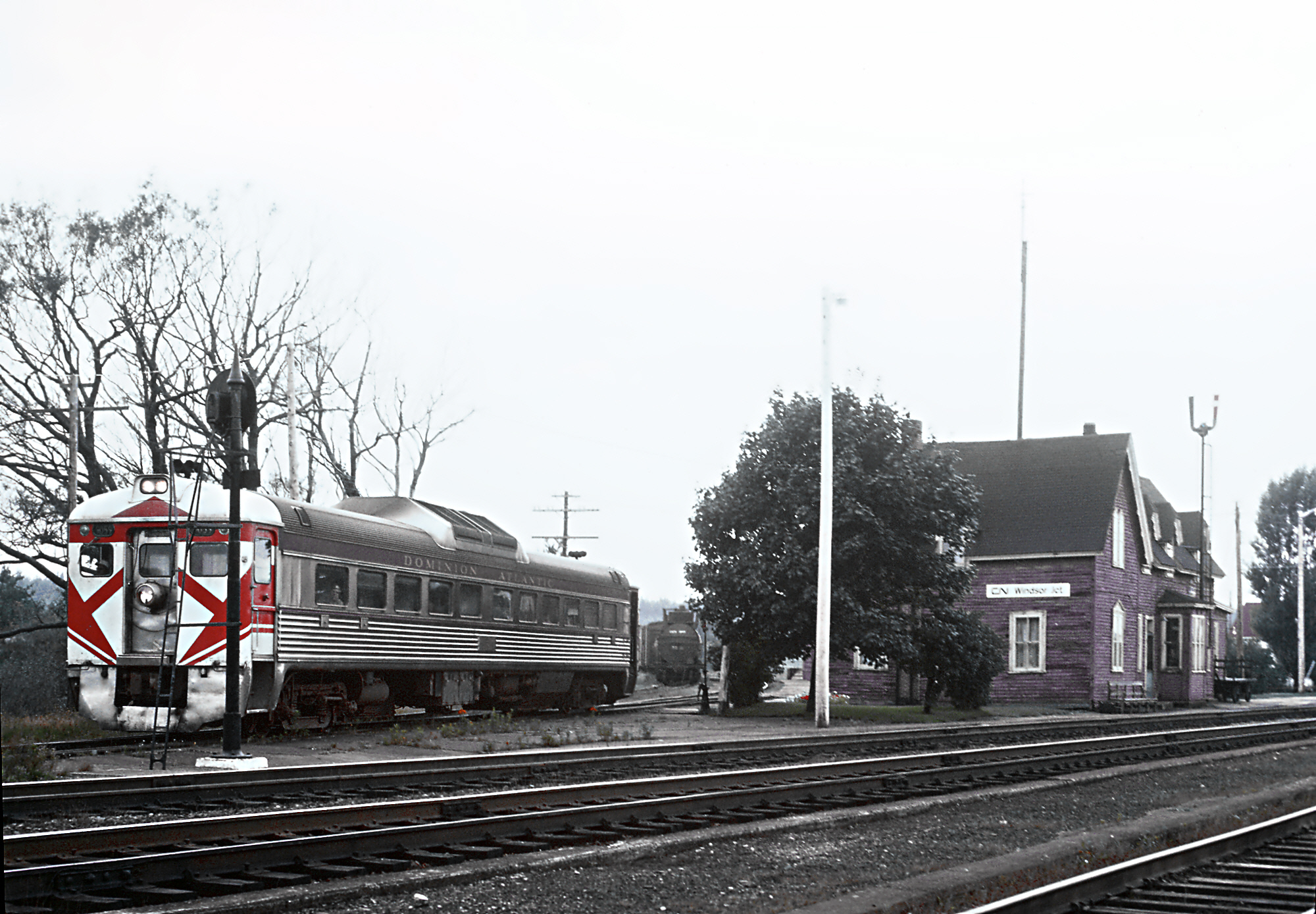
Dominion Atlantic Railway train at Windsor Junction

The name of the community was established by the Nova Scotia Railway (NSR) in 1858 after a railway junction was located between Second and Third Lakes, north of the Bedford Basin. This junction was where the line from Halifax split into lines to Truro and Windsor. Another railway line was built from Dartmouth to Windsor Junction in 1896.

The NSR and its railway stations were primarily built by Irish and German settlers in the area. With Nova Scotia's entry into Confederation in 1867, ownership of the NSR passed from the provincial government to the federal government, which folded it into the Intercolonial Railway (ICR). The line to Windsor was leased in 1871 to the Windsor & Annapolis Railway, which became part of the Dominion Atlantic Railway (DAR) in 1894. The ICR built the railway line from Windsor Junction to Dartmouth in 1896 and the ICR became part of Canadian Government Railways in 1915, which was then folded into the Canadian National Railways (CNR) in 1918. In 1912 the DAR was purchased by Canadian Pacific Railway (CPR).

Windsor Junction was served by two stations in its history, the first built in 1857, which included a saloon. It was replaced in 1882 by an Intercolonial Railway style station, noted for its station gardens, which was staffed until 1978 and then demolished in 1984.

In 1994, CPR sold the DAR and the line from Windsor Junction to Windsor became part of the Windsor and Hantsport Railway (WHR). CN's mainline from Halifax-Truro and its branch from Windsor Junction to Dartmouth are still used by 8 to 10 freight trains daily, while the WHR used the line from Windsor Junction to Windsor on a less-frequent schedule, until about 2012 when it closed. The CN mainline at Windsor Junction still carries heavy freight service, mostly container trains, while Via Rail's Ocean passenger service passes through the community 6 days per week.
