= Chemin de fer de la Matapédia et du Golfe =

Short line railway in Quebec, Canada

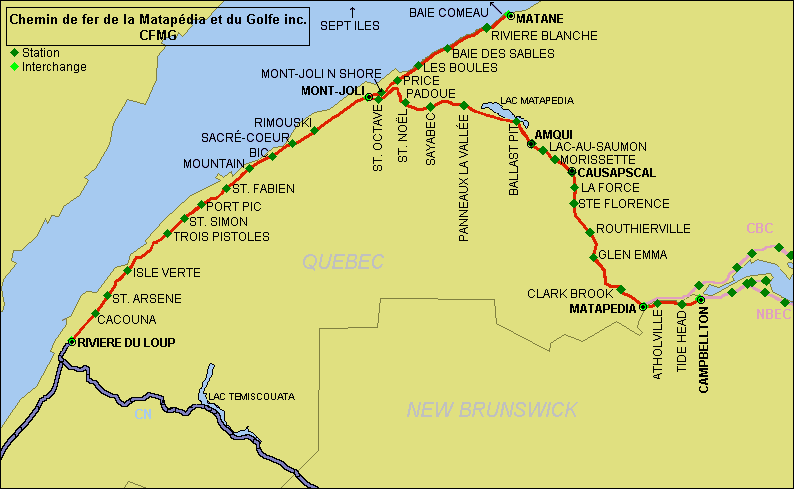
- Map of Chemin de fer de la Matapédia et du Golfe

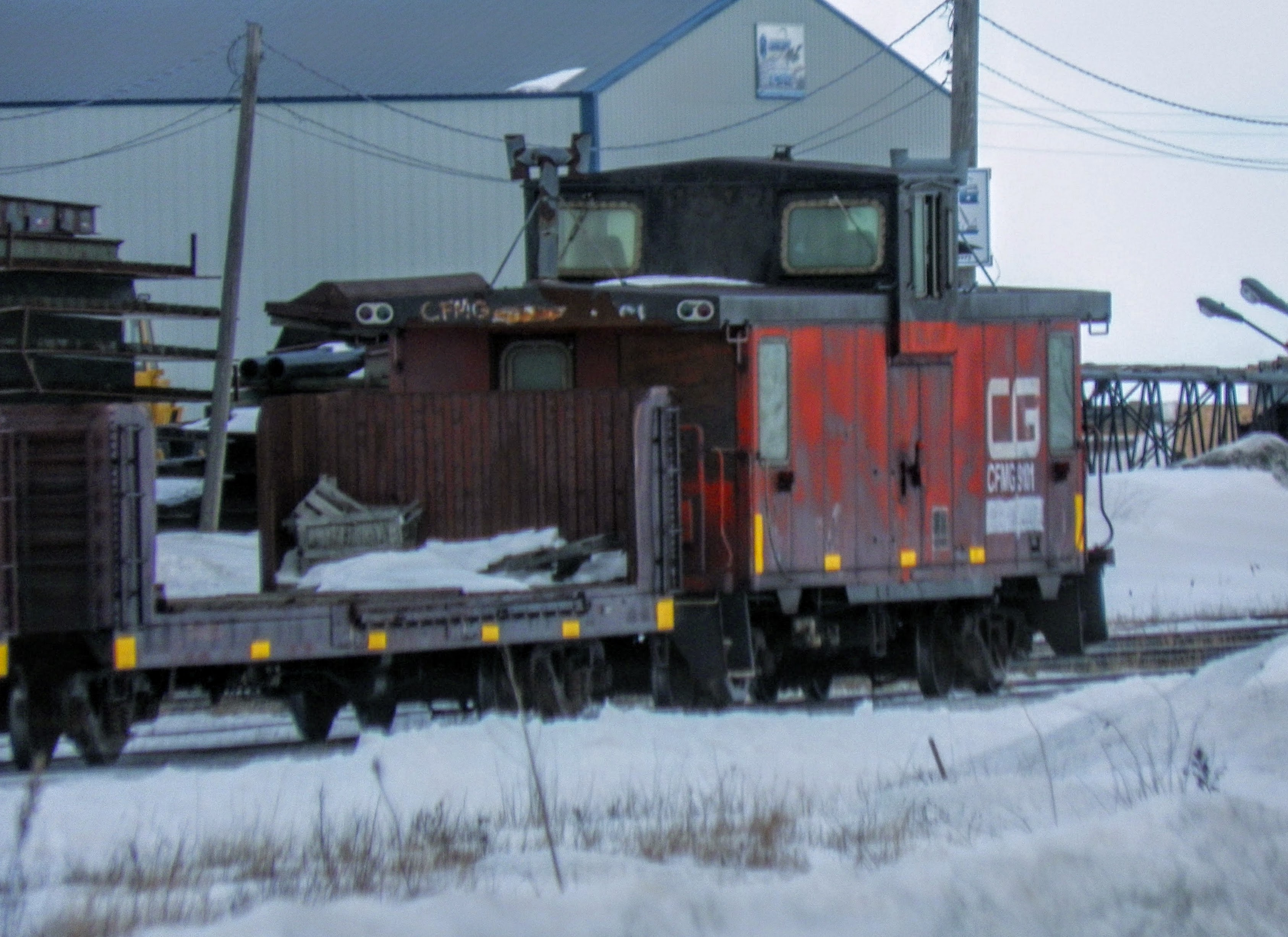
- A caboose used for the rail ferry loading and offloading operations in Matane harbour

Overview
- Headquarters: Mont-Joli
- Reporting mark: CFMG
- Locale: eastern Quebec
- Dates of operation: 1998–2008
- Successor: Canadian National Railway

Technical
- Track gauge: 4 ft 8 1/2 in (1,435 mm) standard gauge

The Chemin de fer de la Matapédia et du Golfe (reporting mark CFMG) (in English, the Matapedia and Gulf Railway) was a short line railway that operated in eastern Quebec from 1998 to 2008.

Owned by the holding company Quebec Railway Corporation (QRC), CFMG operated freight service between Rivière-du-Loup in the west to Matapédia in the east as well as from Mont-Joli to the port of Matane.

== 1998 establishment ==
The Chemin de fer de la Matapédia et du Golfe was established on 19 January 1998 as a subsidiary of QRC to operate the eastern half of the former Canadian National Railway (CN) Mont Joli Subdivision (this being the former Intercolonial Railway mainline) between Mont-Joli and Matapédia.

This first incarnation of CFMG had the following spurs and/or connections:

- Mont-Joli - CFMG connected with CN which continued to operate the western half of the Mont Joli Subdivision to Rivière-du-Loup and St. Andre Junction, as well as the Matane Subdivision to Matane.
- Matapédia - CFMG connected with sister company Chemin de fer Baie des Chaleurs (CBC) which operated the 202 mi (325 km) line northeast from Matapédia to Gaspé. CFMG also connected at the interprovincial boundary between Quebec and New Brunswick (at the Restigouche River) with sister company New Brunswick East Coast Railway (NBEC) which continued the former CN mainline southeast to Moncton.

On 14 February 1999, QRC purchased from CN the Mont Joli Subdivision between Mont-Joli and Rivière-du-Loup as well as the Matane Subdivision between Mont-Joli and Matane. At the Port of Matane, CFMG connected with the railcar ferry service to Baie Comeau which was also purchased from CN by QRC and was operated as a separate subsidiary company called Compagnie de gestion de Matane (COGEMA).

CFMG later obtained running rights over CN approximately 15 mi (24 km) west from Rivière-du-Loup to St. Andre Junction where it connected with the CN mainline from Halifax, Nova Scotia to Montreal, Quebec.

In 2007 QRC sold its Chemin de fer Baie des Chaleurs CBC subsidiary to Société de chemin de fer de la Gaspésie (SCFG) except for a 1 mi (1.6 km) section of the Cascapedia Subdivision east of the wye at Matapédia. Ownership of this section of line and the wye were transferred to CFMG.

== 2008 infrastructure program ==
On 1 February 2008, Quebec Railway Corporation reached an agreement with the Government of Canada and Government of Quebec for $14.6 million in funding for infrastructure improvements on the railway lines between Rivière-du-Loup to Matapédia as well as Mont-Joli to Matane.

This announcement was made by Lawrence Cannon, federal Minister of Transport, and Nathalie Normandeau, Deputy Premier and provincial Minister of Municipal Affairs as well as regional minister for Gaspésie-Îles-de-la-Madeleine, and Claude Béchard, provincial Minister of Natural Resources and Wildlife as well as regional minister for Bas-Saint-Laurent. It would see a combined investment by the two levels of government of $9.7 million ($5.8 million from the federal government, $3.8 million from the provincial government) over a five-year period with additional funding of $5 million from Quebec Railway Corporation.

This funding was targeted at improving track and bridge infrastructure to allow CFMG to carry heavier freight railway cars. It was predicted that the investment would lead to additional spin-off investments of $75 million for railway customers which are predominantly focused on wood products, paper, pulp, particle boards, iron or, and aluminum.

== 2008 sale to CN ==
On 3 November 2008 CN announced that it was purchasing the New Brunswick East Coast Railway (NBEC) and its sister companies Chemin de fer de la Matapédia et du Golfe (CFMG), Compagnie de gestion de Matane (COGEMA), and the Ottawa Central Railway (OCRR) for $49.8 million (CAD) from the Quebec Railway Corporation.

CN said that it planned to change little in the operations of the acquired lines, although the railroad said it intended to invest capital to upgrade the track it acquired, as well as replacing the locomotives with newer motive power.
