= Amherst station (Nova Scotia) =

Railway station in Nova Scotia, Canada

Amherst
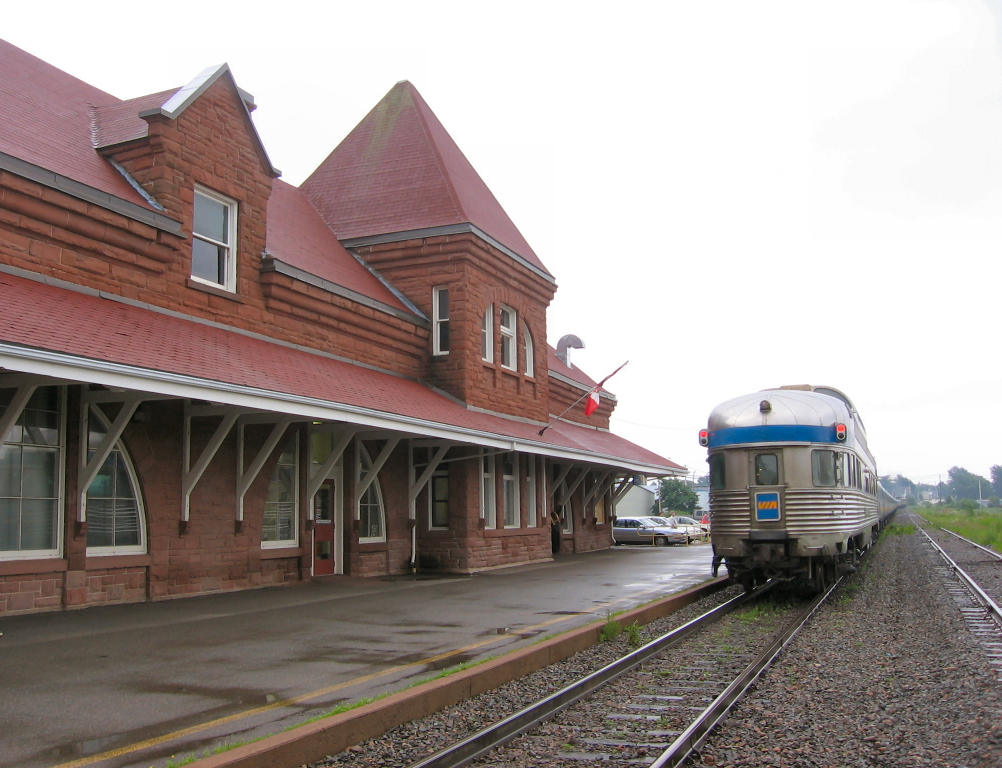
- The eastbound Ocean departing the Amherst Railway Station in summer 2006. The Park Car shown has not been in use since 2021.

General information
- Location: 27 Station Street; Amherst, NS; Canada
- Coordinates: 45°49′50″N 64°12′46″W
- Owner: Via Rail
- Platforms: 1
- Tracks: 1

Construction
- Structure type: Sign post
- Accessible: yes

History
- Opened: 31 August 1908
- Rebuilt: 1975, 1991, 1992 (minor work)
- Former names: Canadian National Railway, Intercolonial Railway

Services
Preceding station	Via Rail	Following station
Sackville toward Montreal	Ocean	Truro toward Halifax
Former Services
Preceding station	Via Rail	Following station
Sackville toward Montreal	Atlantic	Truro toward Halifax
Preceding station	Canadian National Railway	Following station
Fort Lawrence toward St. John	St. John – Halifax	Nappan toward Halifax
Location

Amherst station is an inter-city railway station in Amherst, Nova Scotia served by Via Rail Ocean train.

The station, which opened in 1908, was staffed by Via Rail until October 2012 when the building was closed. Via Rail passenger trains continue to stop at the station, with checked baggage handled by on-train crew members.

In January 2018, the Town of Amherst announced it had reached a purchase agreement with Via. It will take possession of the building and lease it to allow a local entrepreneur for use as a restaurant, with a plan for its eventual transfer to the entrepreneur through a lease-to-own agreement. As part of the agreement, Via passengers will continue to have access to a waiting area and washrooms, and Via will continue to maintain equipment within the building. The Town has also designated it a Municipal Heritage building.

== History ==
The Intercolonial Railway (ICR) opened its line from Truro to Moncton on 9 November 1872.

Initially the ICR served Amherst passengers from a station constructed of wood on the same site as the present-day structure. The present structure was opened on 31 August 1908 and is constructed of local red sandstone.

In 1918, the ICR was merged into another federal Crown corporation, the Canadian National Railways (CNR), however to this day, local residents still refer to the Amherst Railway Station as the Intercolonial Railway Station.

In 1978, CN transferred responsibility for passenger rail services to another federal Crown corporation, Via Rail. Via is the owner and operator of the station, which serves the 3 days a week Ocean route.

Several minor modifications have been undertaken to the structure in recent decades, including removing the south wing in 1975, replacing the bottom exterior stone in 1991 with stone from the Roman Catholic Church once located on Prince Arthur Street, and in 1992 new metal exterior doors were installed.
