= Kinsac, Nova Scotia =

Kinsac
- Location within Nova Scotia
- Coordinates: 44°50′27.7″N 63°39′26.9″W
- Country: Canada
- Province: Nova Scotia
- Municipality: Halifax Regional Municipality
- District: 2

Government
  - Type: Regional Council
  - Governing Council: Halifax Regional Council
  - Community Council: Marine Drive Valley & Canal

Area
  - Total: 0.6 km^{2} (0.23 sq mi)
- Highest elevation: 56 m (184 ft)
- Lowest elevation: 26 m (85 ft)
- Time zone: UTC-4 (AST)
  - Summer (DST): UTC-3 (ADT)
- Canadian Postal code: B4G
- Telephone Exchange: 902 252 864 865 869; 252 864 865 869
- GNBC Code: CATAU
- Part of a series about Places in Nova Scotia

Kinsac is a suburban community in the Canadian province of Nova Scotia, located in District 2 of the Halifax Regional Municipality on Nova Scotia Route 354.
