= Truro station (Nova Scotia) =

Railway station in Nova Scotia, Canada

Truro
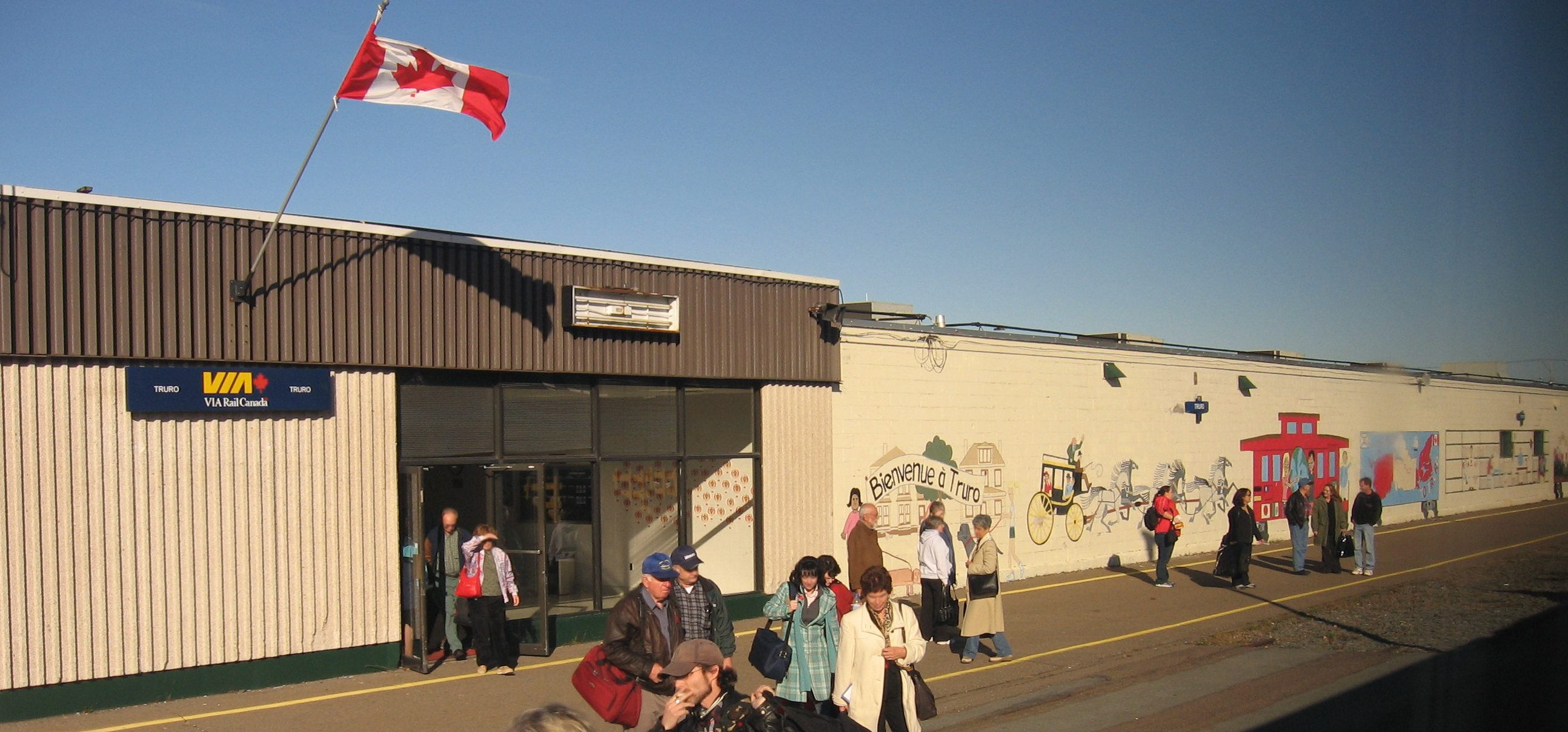
- The platform at the Truro Railway Station. Decorative murals featuring local history and attractions have been painted along the trackside of the adjoining Truro Centre east and west of the station platform.

General information
- Location: 104 Esplanade Street; Truro, NS; Canada
- Coordinates: 45°21′46″N 63°16′32″W
- Owner: Via Rail
- Platforms: 1
- Tracks: 1

Construction
- Parking: Short term only. No overnight.
- Accessible: yes

Other information
- Status: Staffed station

History
- Opened: 1972
- Former names: Canadian National Railway

Services
Preceding station	Via Rail	Following station
Amherst toward Montreal	Ocean	Halifax Terminus
Former services
Preceding station	Via Rail	Following station
Amherst toward Montreal	Atlantic	Halifax Terminus
Former services at CN station
Preceding station	Canadian National Railway	Following station
Belmont toward St. John	St. John – Halifax	Mill Brook Crossing toward Halifax
Terminus	Truro – Sydney	Murray toward Sydney
Location

Truro station is an intercity railway station in Truro, Nova Scotia. It is operated by Via Rail.

== History ==
The Nova Scotia Railway opened its line from Richmond (in present-day Halifax's North End) to Truro in December 1858. For the first decade of rail service to the town, the NSR served passengers from a small wooden structure located approximately where the present-day station is situated.

In June 1867 the NSR opened its eastern extension from Truro to the Northumberland Strait port of Pictou Landing.

In the following month, Confederation on 1 July 1867 saw ownership of the NSR transferred from the Government of Nova Scotia to the Government of Canada. In 1872 the federal government merged the NSR into its new Crown corporation, the Intercolonial Railway. That November saw the ICR complete a new line from Truro to Moncton and by 1876 the line would be extended to Quebec. The new line to Moncton diverged from the Halifax-Pictou mainline immediately east of the station in a broad curve.

1872 was also the year that the ICR opened a new station to replace the original NSR building. The larger terminal was also constructed of wood but had a handsome hip roof and large passenger waiting areas, baggage and express freight handling areas, along with offices for local railway officials. More than 20 trains per day were calling at the Truro station during the late 19th century. The new station was located in the same vicinity as the original NSR station and adjoined a new ICR round house for servicing steam locomotives.

In 1901 the Midland Railway opened its line across Hants County, connecting Truro to Windsor and the Dominion Atlantic Railway through the Annapolis Valley. In 1905, the DAR purchased the Midland line, bringing this important regional railway to the town.

In 1904, the Truro Railway Station saw the inaugural Ocean Limited, a daily express service from Halifax to Montreal. This was supplanted by the Maritime Express and the Scotian, as well as various local trains.

In 1906 the ICR constructed a new round house in the town's east end along the line to Pictou. In 1911 a disastrous fire destroyed the ICR passenger station. It was replaced by a grand stonework station that opened in January 1914. The new station was a mammoth sandstone structure, with granite steps and elaborate decorative tile floors, topped with a signature clock tower. It occupied almost 2 blocks along the south side of present-day Esplanade Street from Inglis Street to Outram Street, with 1,200 foot long platform facing the ICR tracks. The DAR accessed the station at the west end of the terminal trackage on its own line while the ICR trains used the mainline.

In 1918, the ICR was merged into the new federal Crown corporation Canadian National Railways (CNR). The large sandstone railway station in Truro saw constant use through the First World War, Great Depression, Second World War and the post-war era. It was during the 1950s and 1960s that passenger rail traffic began to drop as a result of increased taxpayer-funded highways and airports, thus by the late 1960s, CN was looking at reducing its operating costs for historic railway station buildings, as well as eliminating unproductive railway property that it was paying tax upon.

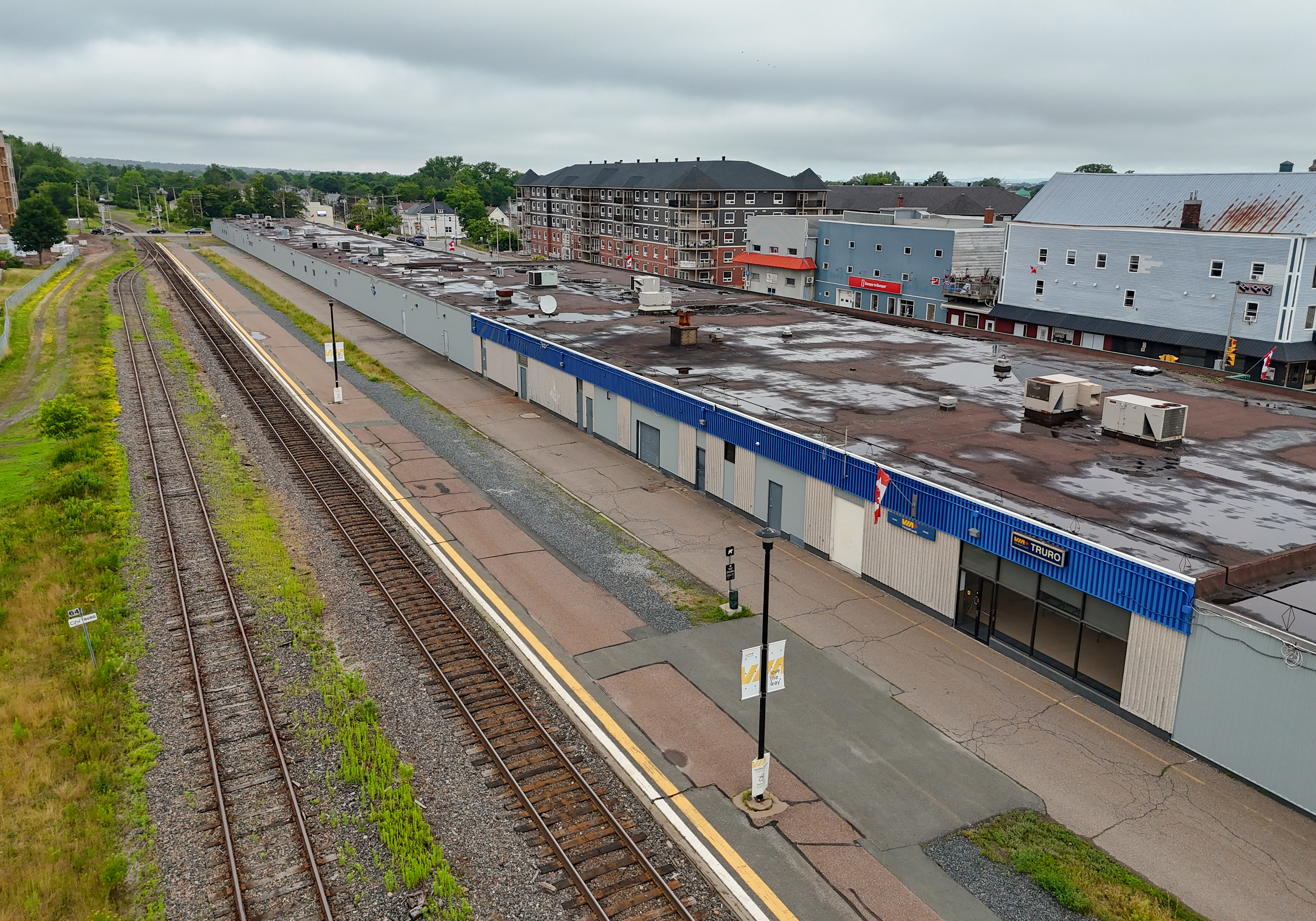
The current station built in 1974

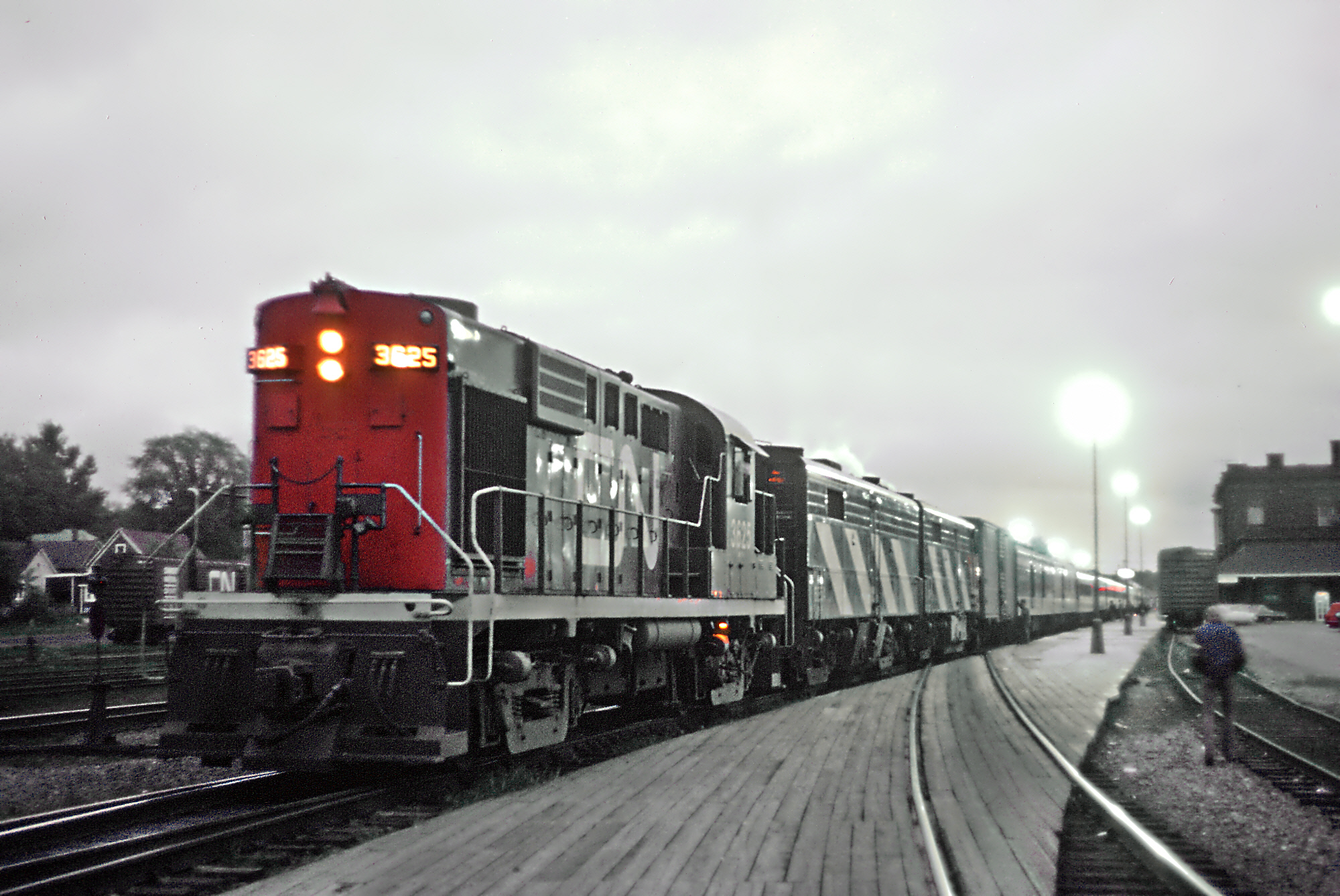
The Scotian, at Truro station on September 6, 1970

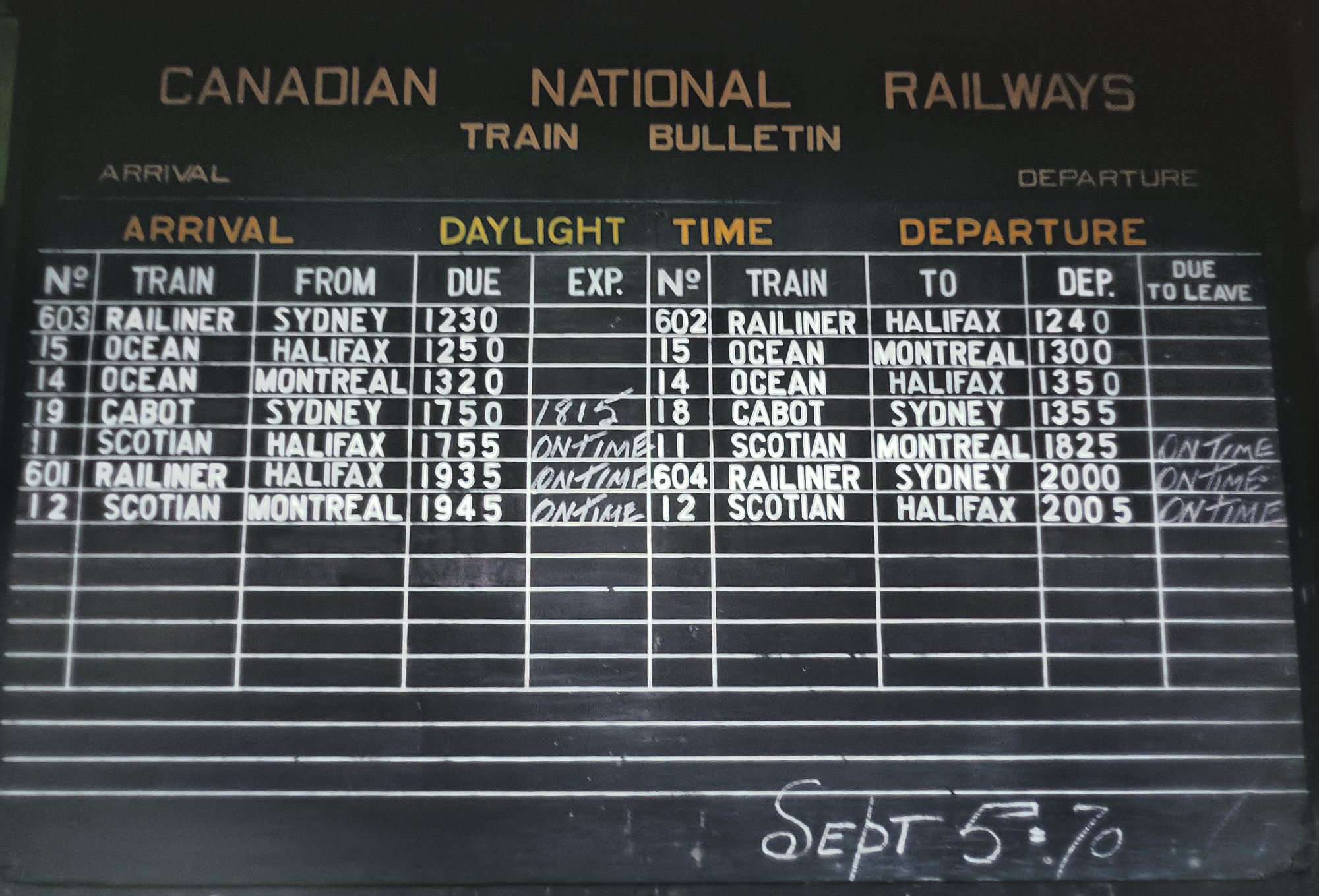
Canadian National Railways train bulletin board at Truro Station 5 September 1970.

The Dominion Atlantic Railway decided in 1959 to leave the large CN station and built a modest combined passenger and freight station at Willow Street on the western side of Truro. It remained in used until 1983 when the DAR closed its Midland Line from Truro to Windsor.

In 1972 CN, to the chagrin of many residents in the town, demolished the large sandstone station building and replaced it with a linear concrete strip mall (called the Truro Centre) which served to separate the town from the active rail yard opposite the station. A new passenger station was placed in the strip mall in the same location as the predecessor railway stations. The DAR (operated as CP Rail) continued to offer a mixed train service from Truro to Windsor during the 1970s but from a new passenger/freight station at the west end of the town on Willow Street.

In 1978, CN and CP transferred responsibility for their passenger services to a new federal Crown corporation Via Rail; at this time the mixed train service on the DAR to Windsor was cancelled. Passenger rail service in Truro as offered by Via Rail was relatively stable during the 1980s as the town enjoyed a moderate frequency of trains. This came to an abrupt halt on 15 January 1990 after massive budget cuts to Via Rail saw rail service from Truro to Sydney, as well as to Edmundston, New Brunswick annulled, leaving Truro with only the 6 day/week Ocean service from Halifax to Montreal. Further cuts in June 2012 resulted in "The Ocean" being reduced to three trips per week.

During the early 2000s, CN removed all of the yard trackage in the vicinity of the station with only a mainline to Moncton and a mainline to Sydney left in operation. The platforms at the station were reduced to the one on the Halifax-Moncton mainline. An anti-graffiti plan by the town has seen large decorative murals painted on the trackside of the Truro Centre east and west of the station; most of the murals depict town history and local attractions centred on a railway theme. These murals lasted until early 2018, when they were covered over with metal siding.

In 2006 the Town of Truro commissioned a master plan which envisions extending Inglis Street south across the tracks to connect the central business district with Victoria Park. This would require demolishing part of the Truro Centre, including the present post-1972 station, in order to create a railway crossing. The master plan also envisions building a new, more architecturally and aesthetically pleasing railway station on the southeast side of this new intersection with the extended Inglis Street and Esplanade Street.
