= Sackville station =

Railway station in New Brunswick, Canada

Sackville
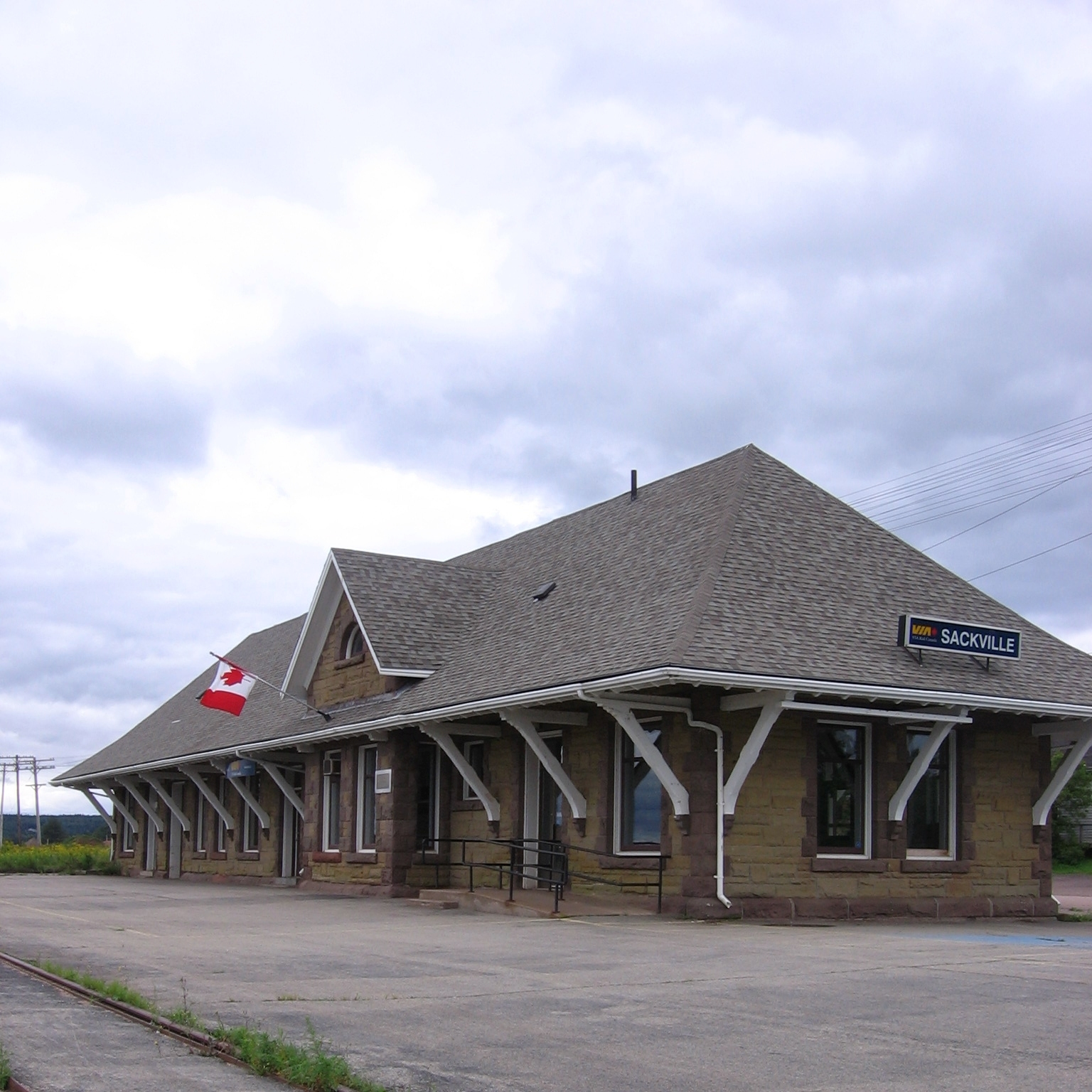

General information
- Location: 66 Lorne Street; Sackville, NB; Canada
- Coordinates: 45°53′25″N 64°22′02″W
- Owner: Via Rail
- Platforms: 1
- Tracks: 1

Construction
- Structure type: Sign post
- Parking: Short term only.
- Accessible: yes

History
- Opened: 1907
- Former names: Canadian National Railway, Intercolonial Railway

Services
Preceding station	Via Rail	Following station
Moncton toward Montreal	Ocean	Amherst toward Halifax
Former Services
Preceding station	Via Rail	Following station
Moncton toward Montreal	Atlantic	Amherst toward Halifax
Preceding station	Canadian National Railway	Following station
Evans toward St. John	St. John – Halifax	Aulac toward Halifax
Terminus	Sackville – Cape Tormentine	Middle Sackville toward Cape Tormentine
Location

The Sackville station is an inter-city railway station in Sackville, New Brunswick. It is operated by Via Rail. The station was staffed until October 2012. The building is now closed, though Via Rail passenger trains continue to stop at the station. Checked baggage service is now handled by on-train crew members.

== History ==
The Intercolonial Railway (ICR) opened between Truro and Moncton on 9 November 1872. ICR passengers in Sackville were initially served by a station constructed from wood that was located near the site of the present-day station, not far from the Sackville Harbour turning basin and shipping wharves.

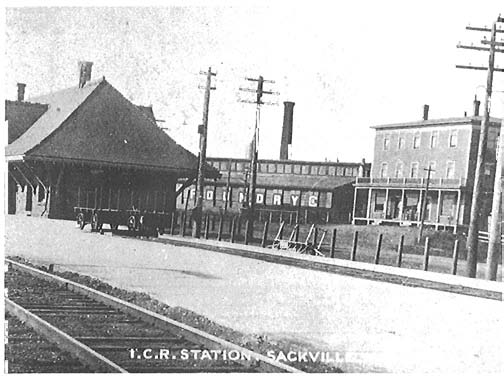
Photo of the ICR station.

The ICR project created the impetus for several industrial concerns to establish in Sackville, one of these being the Dominion Foundry Company, which was established in 1872 near the railway station to manufacture stoves. The firm changed ownership in 1888, becoming the Enterprise Foundry Company.

On 8 April 1874 the New Brunswick & Prince Edward Island Railway Company began construction of a line from Sackville to Cape Tormentine. Construction halted after several months and the project lay dormant until 1878 when new project backers restarted construction. The line opened in 1887, joining with the ICR mainline east of the station. On 15 October 1917 the federal government opened a train ferry service from Cape Tormentine to Port Borden, giving importance to the Sackville railway junction.

In 1905 the ICR undertook to build a replacement station building, opening the new 1 1/2-storey station in 1907. It was constructed of locally quarried plum and olive coloured sandstone and was located adjacent to the original ICR wood station structure overlooking the Tantramar Marshes and Sackville Harbour.

The new station building is a long, low rectangular block with a bell-cast hip roof and projecting bay windows on both the track and Lorne Street sides of the structure. The overhanging eaves expose wood brackets and tongue-and-groove boarding. A gabled dormer and round-arched window with stone voussoir projects above each bay window.

On the night of 29 July 1908 a fire broke out on the Enterprise Foundry property, destroying the foundry plant as well as the Intercolonial Railway Hotel and the original Intercolonial Railway Station. The new station received minor damage but was not destroyed.

In 1918 the ICR was merged into the new federal Crown corporation Canadian National Railways (CNR). CN transferred responsibility for its passenger rail services to the new federal Crown corporation Via Rail in 1978.

== See also ==
- List of designated heritage railway stations of Canada
