= Société des chemins de fer du Québec =

- Founded: 1993; 32 years ago
- Founder: Groupe Jean Fournier Incorporated and private investors
- Defunct: 2009

The Société des chemins de fer du Québec (SCFQ), or Quebec Railway Corporation (reporting mark QRC) in English, is a former Canadian railway holding company that owned several short line railways in the provinces of Quebec, Ontario, New Brunswick and Nova Scotia.

The company was formed in 1993 by Groupe Jean Fournier Incorporated and a group of private investors.

== Former subsidiaries ==
From 1993-2009, Quebec Railway Corporation purchased and operated several rail lines throughout eastern Canada.

- Chemin de fer Charlevoix, operating between Quebec City and Clermont, Quebec in the Charlevoix region. Bought from CN by the QRC, it was the holding company's first subsidiary short line. Operations began in 1993. The section of the line between Quebec City and La Malbaie, Quebec was sold to Le Massif for a tourist train operation in April 2009 while the section east of La Malbaie to Clermont has been abandoned.
- Chemin de fer Baie des Chaleurs, operating between Matapédia, Quebec and Gaspé, Quebec on the Gaspé Peninsula). Bought from CN by the QRC, with operations beginning in 1996, and subsequently sold in 2007 to the regional county municipalities it serves.
- Chemin de fer de la Matapédia et du Golfe (former CN Mont Joli and Matane Subdivisions, operates between Rivière-du-Loup, Quebec and Campbellton, New Brunswick and from Mont-Joli to Matane, Quebec.
- Compagnie de gestion de Matane (COGEMA) (operates a rail ferry from Matane, Quebec to Baie-Comeau, Quebec as well as trackage in Baie-Comeau).
- New Brunswick East Coast Railway (former CN Newcastle, Nepisiguit and Dalhousie Subdivisions, operates between Campbellton, New Brunswick and Pacific Junction, New Brunswick, near Moncton, New Brunswick)
- Ottawa Central Railway (former CN Subdivisions, operates between Ottawa Ontario and Pembroke, Ontario in the Ottawa Valley)
- Ontario L'Orignal Railway (former CN Subdivisions, operates between Hawkesbury, Ontario and Glen Robertson, Ontario, was created in 1996 by RailLink, later became a RailTex and RailAmerica company, the line was purchased by SCFQ in 2000 and merged into OCRR)
- Sydney Coal Railway (former Devco Railway), operates between Sydney, Nova Scotia and New Waterford, Nova Scotia and Glace Bay, Nova Scotia on Cape Breton Island, railway trackage is owned by Nova Scotia Power Corporation, operation was subcontracted to SCFQ)

== 2008 divestment ==
On 3 November 2008 CN announced that it was purchasing the New Brunswick East Coast Railway (NBEC) and its sister companies Chemin de fer de la Matapédia et du Golfe (CFMG), Compagnie de gestion de Matane (COGEMA), and the Ottawa Central Railway (OCRR) for $49.8 million (CAD) from the Quebec Railway Corporation.

CN said that it planned to change little in the operations of the acquired lines, although the railroad said it intended to invest capital to upgrade the track it acquired, as well as replacing the locomotives with newer motive power.

On the same date, Logistec Corporation announced that it was purchasing the Sydney Coal Railway (SCR) from the Quebec Railway Corporation.
