= Windsor and Hantsport Railway =

Railway line in Nova Scotia, Canada

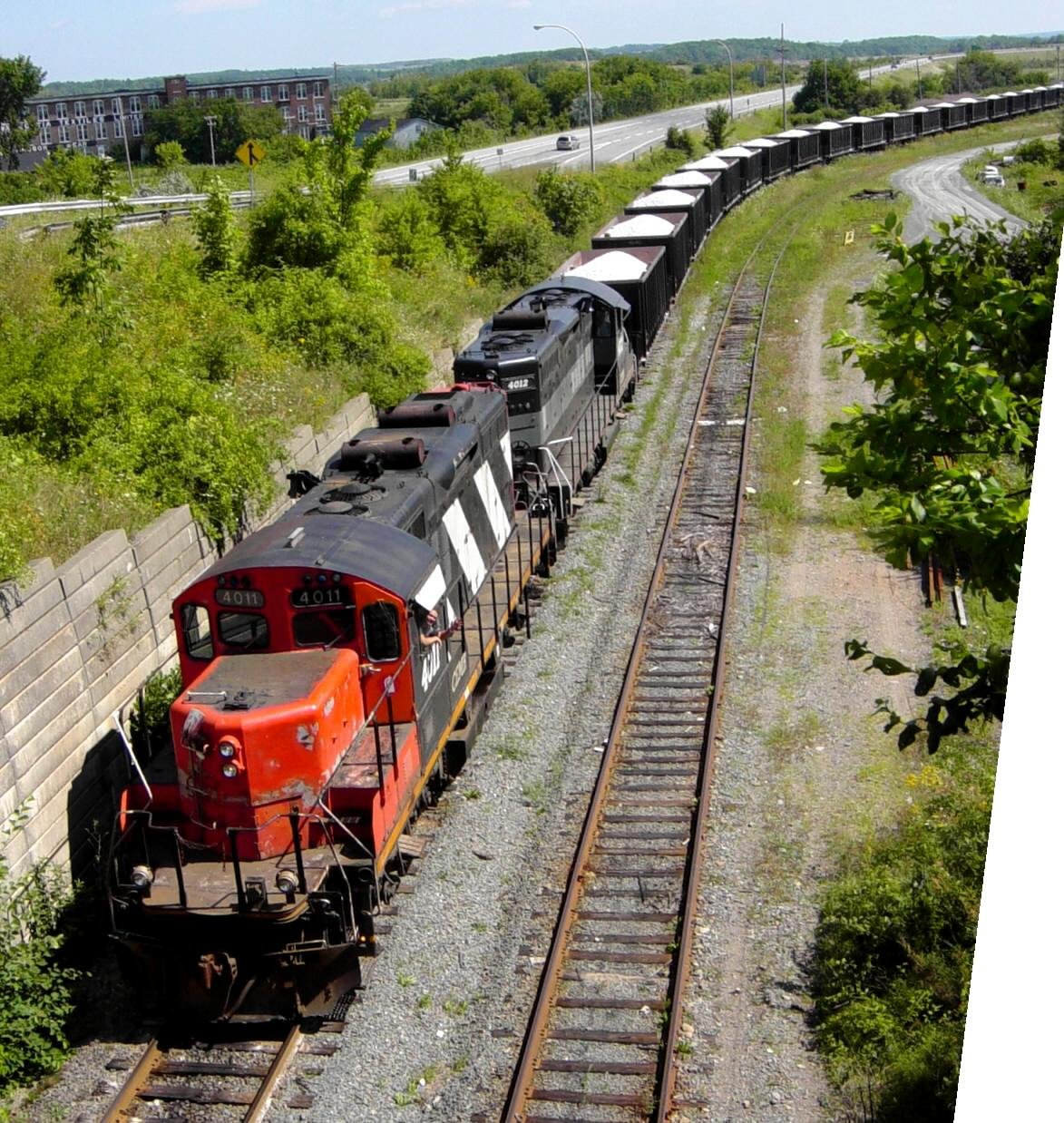
- WHR gypsum train westbound at Windsor, 22 Aug 2006.

Overview
- Headquarters: Windsor, Nova Scotia
- Reporting mark: WHRC
- Locale: Nova Scotia, Canada
- Dates of operation: 1994–2011

Technical
- Track gauge: 4 ft 8 1/2 in (1,435 mm) standard gauge

The Windsor and Hantsport Railway (reporting mark WHRC) was a 56-mile (90.1 km) railway line in Nova Scotia between Windsor Junction (north of Bedford) and New Minas with a spur at Windsor which runs several miles east, serving two gypsum quarries located at Wentworth Creek and Mantua. It suspended operations in 2011.

The mainline (and related spurs) were formerly owned by Canadian Pacific Railway subsidiary Dominion Atlantic Railway from 1894 to 1994 before being sold to shortline holding company Iron Road Railways. WHRC began operations on Saturday, August 27, 1994, making it Nova Scotia's second shortline railway after Cape Breton and Central Nova Scotia Railway, which was formed one year earlier.

== Route description ==
The WHRC route between Windsor Junction and New Minas is part of CPR's (and DAR's) former Halifax Subdivision. The section from Windsor to Windsor Junction was built as the Windsor Branch of the Nova Scotia Railway, opening in 1858, and is currently owned by Canadian National Railway (CN). The WHRC route west of Windsor to Hantsport and ending at New Minas, was built as the Windsor and Annapolis Railway between 1867 and 1872, which became the Dominion Atlantic Railway in 1894. The section east of Windsor to the gypsum quarries at Wentworth Creek and Mantua was built as the Midland Railway and opened in 1901. This was CPR/DAR's Truro Subdivision until the line east of the gypsum quarry at Mantua to Truro was abandoned in 1983.

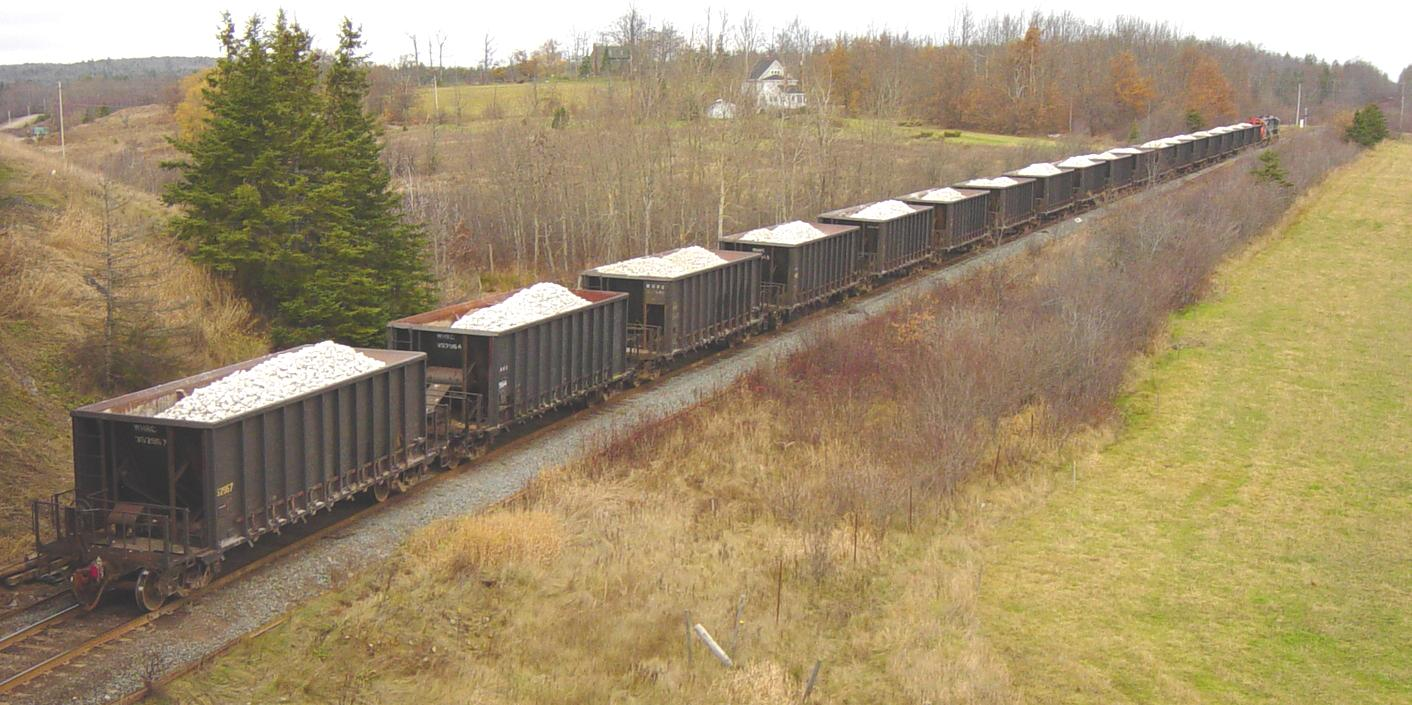
WHR gypsum train at Falmouth, 16 Nov 2006.

== Traffic ==
The WHRC had no traffic sources on the longest portion of its network, the line between Windsor and Windsor Junction, where it interchanges with Canadian National Railway on that company's Halifax-Montreal mainline. The majority of WHRC traffic originated at the two gypsum quarries on the spur running east of Windsor. These quarries are owned and operated by Fundy Gypsum Company, a subsidiary of United States Gypsum Corporation. The gypsum from these quarries is hauled by WHRC unit trains to the port at Hantsport for export by ship to the United States. There are several manufacturing and agricultural-related traffic sources in an industrial park in New Minas, west of Hantsport. A summer excursion passenger service between Windsor and Grand Pre was operated in the late 1990s and early 2000s.

Hantsport has one of the fastest ship loaders in the world due to its location on the Avon River, which was affected by the incredible tidal range of the Bay of Fundy. The fluctuating water level meant that bulk carriers could not stay at the dock longer than 3–4 hours for fear of touching bottom. The Hantsport ship loader could move 10,000 tons of gypsum per hour.

== 2002 line upgrade, Falmouth - Hantsport ==
In January 2002 WHRC purchased used continuous welded rail from CN for replacing 5 mi (8.0 km) of jointed rail between Falmouth and Hantsport.

== 2007 line embargo, Hantsport - New Minas ==
WHRC embargoed the rail line from Hantsport west to the end of track (west of the New Minas industrial park) in 2007 as a result of deferred maintenance leading to excessive costs for repairing the bridge over the Gaspereau River. WHRC worked with its customers in the New Minas industrial park (a Frito Lay potato chip plant and a Co-Op Atlantic feed mill) to create a rail-truck re-load facility in the WHRC's Windsor yard. Although the track and other infrastructure is still intact, crossings have been paved over and vegetation has been uncontrolled. No freight train has operated west of Hantsport since the line was embargoed, however, WHRC has not applied to Nova Scotia's railway regulator (the Nova Scotia Utility and Review Board) to formally abandon the line; a formal abandonment would permit WHRC to scrap the infrastructure and sell the property.

== 2011 line embargo, Windsor Junction - Hantsport ==
The 2008-2009 economic downturn reduced residential construction activity in the United States, which was the primary market for gypsum exported from Hantsport. The reduced demand forced Fundy Gypsum Co. to idle its two Windsor area quarries for much of 2010. Parent company USG announced the permanent closure of Fundy Gypsum along with the Hantsport loading facility in late 2011.

As a result of loss of freight revenue, WHRC operated its last interchange train from Windsor to Windsor Junction on November 2, 2010. The last gypsum trains ran in the fall of 2011 after the gypsum quarries and Hantsport loader shut down and railway operations ceased by November 15, 2011.

== 2013 line disposal, Windsor Junction - Windsor ==
In February 2013 the Windsor to Windsor Junction section of track returned to control of its owner Canadian National Railway (CN) after a 99-year lease expired.

This line is known as the Windsor Branch and had been built by the Nova Scotia Railway in 1858, with ownership being transferred from the Government of Nova Scotia to the Government of Canada in 1867. The NSR was dissolved in 1872 when its assets were merged into the newly formed Intercolonial Railway (ICR). The ICR's assets were assumed by Canadian Government Railways (CGR) in 1912. The Windsor Branch was leased by CGR in 1914 for 99 years to the Canadian Pacific Railway's (CPR) subsidiary Dominion Atlantic Railway (DAR). A Privy Council order dated July 22, 1993 authorized the sale of CGR to the then-Crown corporation Canadian National Railway (CN) for one Canadian dollar. The sale of the DAR's assets in 1994 to the WHRC saw the lease of the Windsor Branch transferred to the new company.

After the lease expired in February 2013, control of the Windsor Branch's track returned to CN. CN advertised the line for disposal in April 2013.

== See also ==
- Windsor railway station
