= East Milford, Nova Scotia =

Rural community in Halifax, Nova Scotia

Coordinates: 45°0′45.04″N 63°25′54.16″W

East Milford in Nova Scotia

East Milford is a rural community of the Halifax Regional Municipality in the Canadian province of Nova Scotia in the Shubenacadie Valley.
