= Compagnie de gestion de Matane =

Railcar ferry service in Quebec

Compagnie de gestion de Matane Inc.
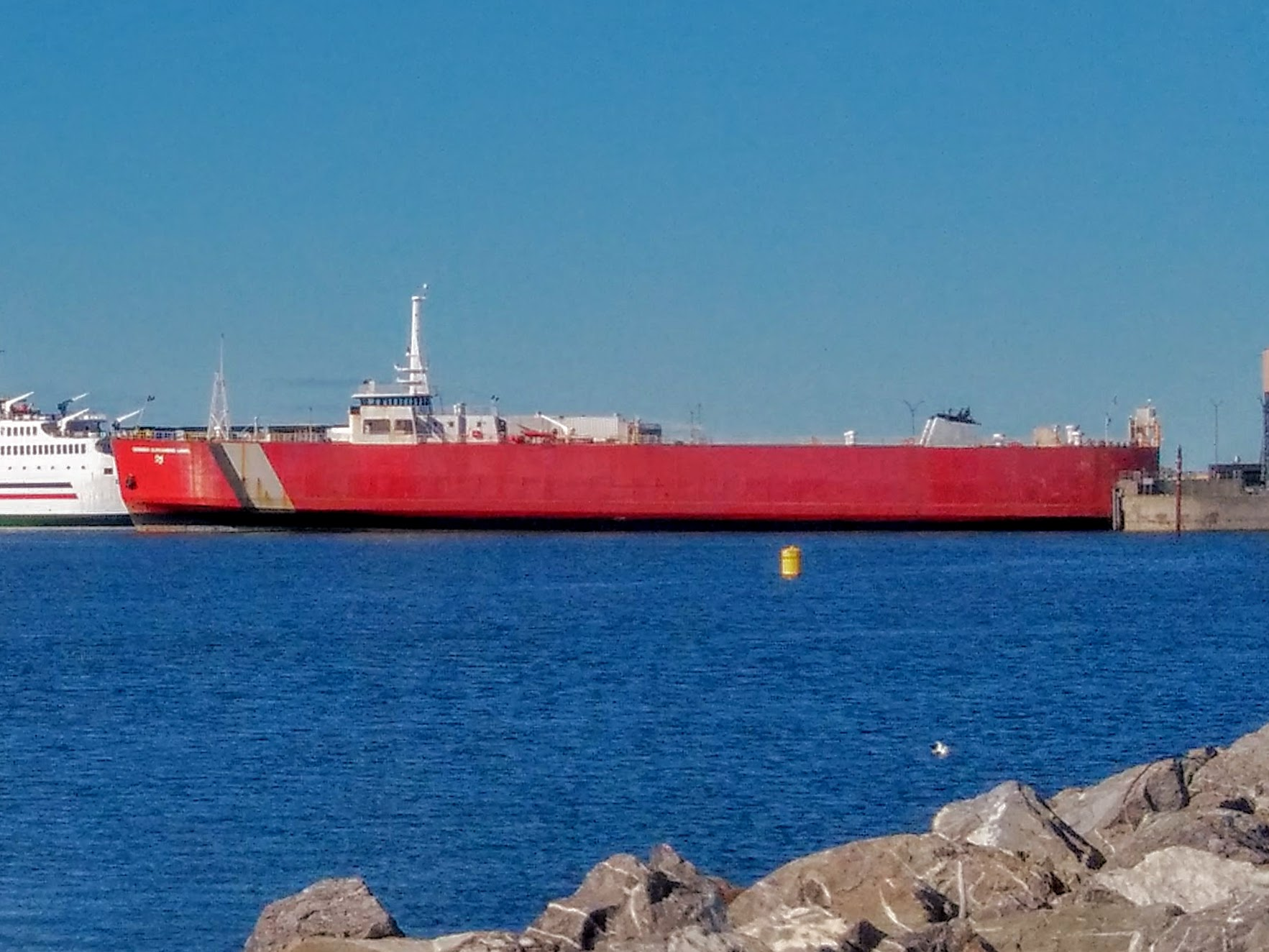
- MV Georges-Alexandre-Lebel rail ferry in Matane.

Overview
- Headquarters: Matane, Quebec
- Locale: Eastern Quebec, Canada
- Dates of operation: 1975–

Technical
- Track gauge: 4 ft 8 1/2 in (1,435 mm) standard gauge

Compagnie de gestion de Matane Inc. (Cogema) is a subsidiary of Canadian National Railway (CN) operating a dedicated railcar ferry service in Quebec between Matane and Baie-Comeau; it also provides occasional railcar ferry service to isolated rail networks at the ports of Port Cartier, Sept-Îles and Havre-Saint-Pierre. It also operates industrial switching to rail customers in Baie-Comeau.

== History ==
The Compagnie de Gestion de Matane (Cogema) was founded in 1973 and began its ferry operations in 1975, providing services along the St. Lawrence River between Matane and Baie-Comeau. The same year, the CN purchased the railway line between Mont-Joli and Matane and initially partnered with Cogema in a technical capacity, later becoming financially involved.

The ferry initially chosen for the service was the Incan Saint-Laurent, a brand-new rail ferry built in Vancouver by Canadian Pacific for a different project between Baie-Comeau and Pointe-au-Pic. CN acquired the ferry, which Cogema leased until it purchased it in 1993. On 31 January 1978 the ferry, renamed MV Georges-Alexandre-Lebel, made its first cargo transport between Baie-Comeau and Matane, with the official service inauguration taking place in May 1978.

On 14 February 1999 Cogema was sold by CN to the Quebec Railway Corporation (QRC), which also purchased the Matane and Mont-Joli Subdivisions at that time. In November 2008, CN re-purchased these assets from QRC, and Cogema expanded its routes to include Sept-Îles, offering twice-weekly trips along the St. Lawrence River.

== Operations ==
COGEMA operates a rail ferry that can accommodate up to 25 railcars per crossing, transporting approximately 670,000 tons of cargo annually. The ferry runs six days a week on the Matane to Baie-Comeau route, taking about 3 hours per trip, and twice a week to Sept-Îles, with an 8-hour voyage time.

== Environmental impact ==
The Cogema ferry system significantly reduces greenhouse gas emissions compared to traditional trucking. It has been reported that using the rail ferry results in up to 55% less fuel consumption, and the Port of Sept-Îles estimated a reduction of up to 5,000 tonnes of greenhouse gases in 2010 due to this service. Additionally, this service alleviates congestion on highways, improving road safety and lowering infrastructure maintenance costs.

== Key customers and commodities ==
Key customers using the Cogema ferry include Alcoa Canada and Aluminerie Alouette, which ship raw materials and finished products via the ferry. Other transported goods include aluminium, paper, lumber, machinery, ammonium nitrate, and rail track materials.

== Connection to rail network ==
The Cogema ferry service is fully integrated with the CN rail network, providing access to 75% of the North American market. This integration enhances competitiveness, reduces transportation costs, and offers efficient connections across North America.

The Cogema connects to the Cartier Railway at Port-Cartier and the Quebec North Shore and Labrador Railway at Sept-Îles.

== See also ==
- Roll-on/roll-off
- Société des traversiers du Québec

== Sources ==
- Trains magazine (February 2009, p9)
- Vessel Finder entry for MV George Alexandre Lebel
