= Canadian Rail Operating Rules =

Railway operating rulebook

The Canadian Rail Operating Rules is a set of operating rules for railways in Canada. It is used by every Canadian railway.

== Overview ==
The Canadian Rail Operating Rules are intended to enhance railway safety. The rules cover employee responsibilities, signalling equipment, procedures for safe train movement, dealing with accidents and other topics that directly and indirectly affect railway safety.

== Categories ==
The full set of Canadian Rail Operating Rules is divided into 22 categories:

1. General Responsibilities
2. General Notice
3. General Rule
4. Definitions
5. Operating Rules
6. Time and Time Tables (Rules 1–6)
7. Signals – General (Rules 11–35)
8. Protection of Impassable or Slow Track (Rules 40–49)
9. Movement of Trains and Engines (Rules 51–116)
10. Radio (Rules 117–127)
11. General Procedures (Rules 131–148)
12. General Bulletin Order (GBO) (Rules 151–155)
13. Forms of GBO
14. Occupancy Control System (OCS) Rules (Rules 301–313)
15. Special Control System (SCS) Rules (Rules 351–353)
16. General Description and Location of Fixed Signals (Rules 401–404)
17. Block and Interlocking Signals (Rules 405–430)
18. Automatic Block Signal System (ABS) Rules (Rules 505–517)
19. Centralized Traffic Control System (CTC) (Rules 560–576)
20. Interlocking Rules (Rule 601–620)
21. Optional Rules (Multi Control System and Rules 49.4, 314, 577 and 577.1)
22. Rules for the Protection of Track Units and Track Work

== Signal aspects ==
- Flashing yellow
- Flashing green
- Flashing red
- Solid red
- Solid green
- Solid white
- Solid yellow

Canada uses a signal system similar to the United States' signalling system, in that signals are either one-, two- or three-headed, and each one can show any of the aspects described above. There are different signal systems for rapid transit and other urban rail systems in Canada. There are also various signs that can be placed on a signal mast, which can modify a signal. An "L" plate upgrades any medium-speed signal to limited speed. An "A" plate is indicative of an absolute signal: it cannot be passed at all-red signals. An "R" plate upgrades a regular all-red signal from a stop-and-proceed signal to a restricting signal. A "DV" plate makes a slow-speed signal into diverging speed. Canadian railways use miles per hour not kilometres per hour, even though road speed limits are in kilometres per hour.

== Speed limits ==
This is a list of the different speed limits defined by the CROR:

Track speed
This means whatever the pre-approved speed limit for the track. (Note that track speed can be as low as 15 miles per hour (24 km/h) or less, but still show a signal for track speed)
Limited speed
This means 45 miles per hour (72 km/h).
Medium speed
This means 30 miles per hour (48 km/h).
Diverging speed
This means 25 miles per hour (40 km/h).
Slow speed
This means 15 miles per hour (24 km/h).
Restricted speed
This means an absolute maximum of 15 miles per hour (24 km/h), and the crew must be extra cautious as well as being able to stop in half the distance of vision.

The signal system explained here assumes the signal displaying has three heads. Any signal indication that has a solid red on the third head down can also be indicated with just two heads. Any indication with solid red lights on the second and third heads down can be indicated with just one head. For example, a green light on the top head still means proceed at track speed, no speed restrictions or stops within the next three signals, regardless of if the signal has only one head or not. A flashing yellow on the second head down with red on top and bottom would still mean limited to stop even if there was no bottom head. This article will also indicate a signal indication by stating the colour of the signal over another colour of the signal over the next colour of the signal, for example red over flashing green over flashing yellow. A signal can indicate some sort of restriction two signals in advance by flashing a yellow on the top head. If the signal heads are staggered, as in, one light is on the left side of the mast, then the next one down to the right side of the mast, etc., then that means signals are controlled by the automated CTC signal system, and that stop signals are not absolute. If all the heads are on one side or the other side of the mast, then a stop signal is absolute. If the signal is absolute, then the stop indication means stop and do not go until the signal improves or the crew gets written permission from RTC to proceed. If they are not absolute, the signal is controlled by CTC, and the crew may go at restricted speed after a complete stop. Any signal that is ambiguous or otherwise unclear or if any of the lights are not showing, then the signal must be read as if they are showing the most restrictive aspects they can display (that is, red) unless a solid yellow is on the bottom head, in which case the signal is interpreted as a restricting signal, because if the other signals are extinguished, they must be interpreted as if they are solid red, and a red over red over yellow does in fact mean restricting.

== Signal indications ==
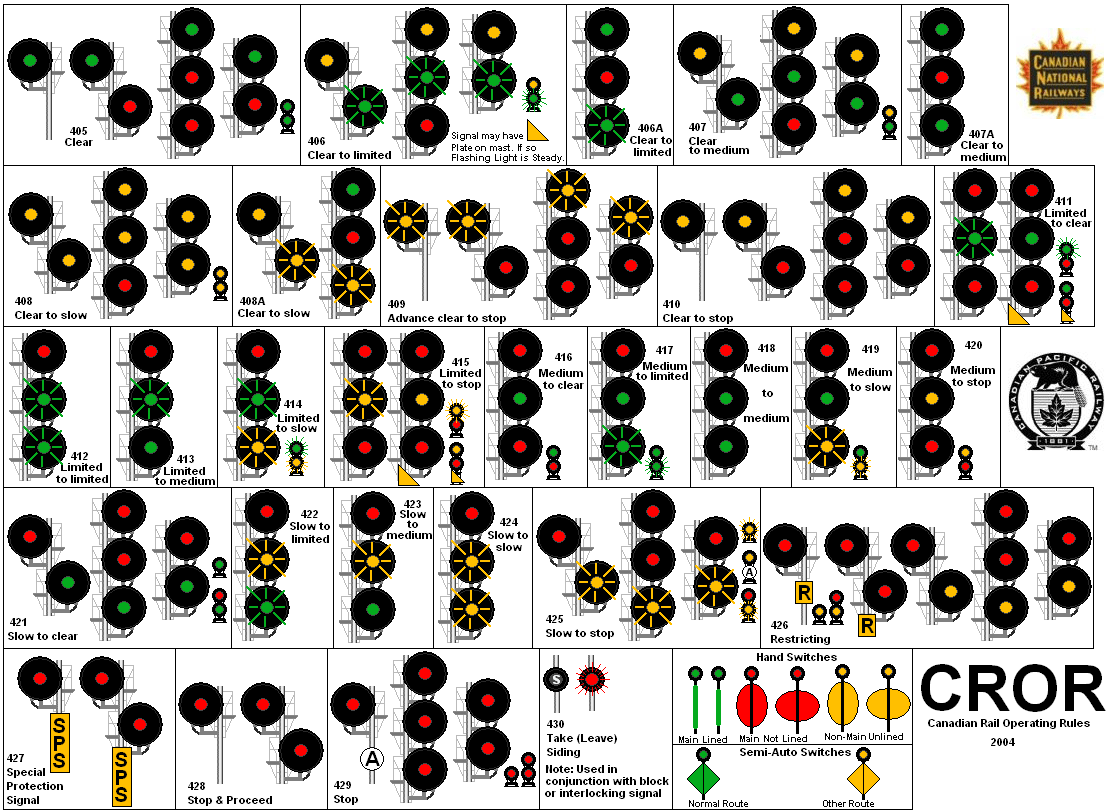
Most of the aspects/rules here are correct but the majority of the rules that shown are no longer correct.

Animated version of the CROR (Canadian Rail Operating Rules) Rule sheet based on the 2022-05-11 release at https://tc.canada.ca/en/rail-transportation/rules/2022-2023/canadian-rail-operating-rules/general-description-location-fixed-signals

- Clear: Green over red over red.
- Clear to Limited: Either yellow over flashing green over red, or green over red over flashing green.
- Clear to Medium: Either yellow over green over red, or green over red over green.
- Clear to Slow: Either yellow over yellow over red, or green over red over flashing yellow.
- Clear to Restricting: Yellow over red over flashing red/white.
- Clear to Stop: Yellow over red over red. Advance Warning: If top light is flashing yellow, signal includes information about sector two signals ahead.
- Advance Clear to Limited: Flashing yellow over flashing green over red.
- Advance Clear to Medium: Flashing yellow over green over red.
- Advance Clear to Slow: Flashing yellow over yellow over red.
- Advance Clear to Stop: Flashing yellow over red over red.
- Limited to Clear: Red over flashing green over red.
- Limited to Limited: Red over flashing green over flashing green.
- Limited to Medium: Red over flashing green over green.
- Limited to Slow: Red over flashing green over flashing yellow.
- Limited to Restricting: Red over flashing green over flashing red/white.
- Limited to Stop: Red over flashing yellow over red.
- Medium to Clear: Red over green over red.
- Medium to Limited: Red over green over flashing green.
- Medium to Medium: Red over green over green.
- Medium to Slow: Red over green over yellow.
- Medium to Restricting: Red over green over flashing red/white.
- Medium to Stop: Red over yellow over red.

(An L plate on the signal mast makes any medium-speed indication a limited-speed upgrade)

- Slow to Clear: Red over red over green.
- Slow to Limited: Red over flashing yellow over flashing green.
- Slow to Medium: Red over flashing yellow over green.
- Slow to Slow: Red over flashing yellow over flashing yellow.
- Slow to Restricting: Red over flashing yellow over flashing red/white.
- Slow to Stop: Red over red over flashing yellow.
- Restricting: Red over red over yellow.

(A slow-speed indication becomes diverging speed if the mast has a DV plate)

- Stop: Red over red over red
- Take or Leave Siding or Other Track: Red over red over flashing red.
