= Nova Scotia Railway =

Historic Canadian railway

Overview
- Headquarters: Halifax, Nova Scotia
- Locale: central Nova Scotia
- Dates of operation: 1853–1872
- Successor: Intercolonial Railway

Technical
- Track gauge: 5 ft 6 in (1,676 mm)

The Nova Scotia Railway is a historic Canadian railway. It was composed of two lines, one connecting Richmond (immediately north of Halifax) with Windsor, the other connecting Richmond with Pictou Landing via Truro.

The railway was incorporated March 31, 1853 and received a charter to build railway lines from Halifax to Pictou by way of Truro, as well as from Halifax to Victoria Beach, Nova Scotia on the Annapolis Basin opposite Digby by way of Windsor. The company also received a charter to build from Truro to the border with New Brunswick. The railway was a key project of the visionary Nova Scotian leader Joseph Howe who felt a government built railway led by Nova Scotia was necessary after the failure of the Intercolonial Railway talks and several fruitless private proposals.

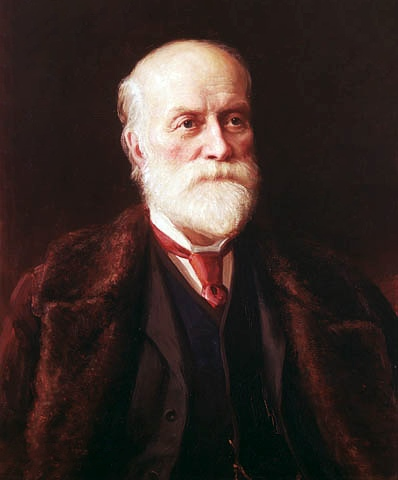
Sandford Fleming supervised construction of the Eastern Line of the NSR in 1867.

The railway line to Windsor (known as the Windsor Branch) was opened in June 1858 and the line to Truro (known as the Eastern Line) was opened in December 1858. No further work was undertaken on the line to Victoria Beach beyond Windsor but the Eastern Line to Pictou Landing was completed by June 1867, under the supervision of Sir Sandford Fleming. The construction of the Nova Scotia Railway by the colonial government was partly encouraged by the construction failures and ongoing delays in building the Shubenacadie Canal The success of the railway came at the expense of the canal which opened in 1861, but soon fell into disrepair from lack of use (and because the rail bridges over the canal were too low for the steamers on the canal).

One noteworthy early feature of operations on the Nova Scotia Railway was the first known case of intermodal operations involving the "piggyback" transport of road vehicles on railway cars. Farmers in the Windsor area were able to drive their teams of horses and loaded wagons onto railway cars and be transported into Halifax to sell their loads, returning to Windsor the same day.

On July 1, 1867, ownership of the NSR was passed from the Government of Nova Scotia to the Government of Canada.

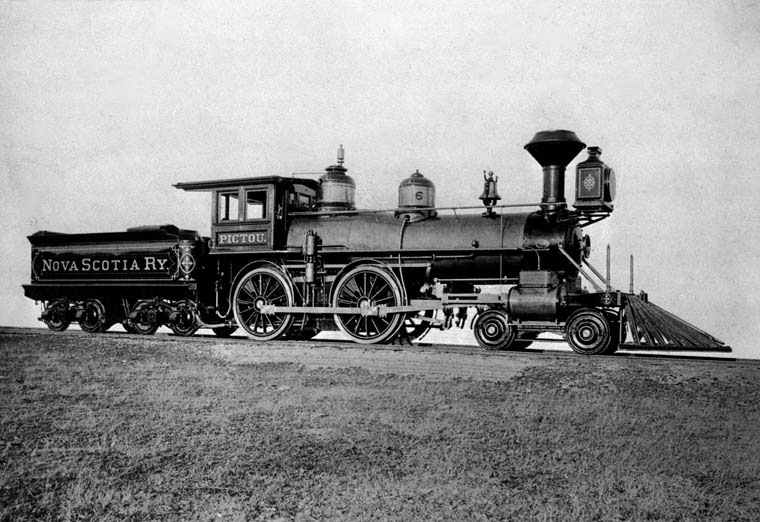
Engine No. 6, Pictou

The Windsor Branch was leased to the Windsor and Annapolis Railway in 1871. The W&A became part of the Dominion Atlantic Railway or DAR in 1894 and the DAR itself was purchased by the Canadian Pacific Railway or CPR in 1912, although it was operated as a separate entity. When the DAR was sold by CPR in 1994, the Windsor Branch came under the control of the shortline Windsor and Hantsport Railway.

The Government of Canada dissolved the NSR in 1872 when it became part of the Intercolonial Railway. The ICR in turn was controlled by Canadian Government Railways from 1915 to 1918 and was merged into the Canadian National Railways or CNR in 1918. The Halifax to Truro line remains part of CN, however the rest of the Eastern Line from Truro to Pictou was sold by CN in 1993 to the Cape Breton and Central Nova Scotia Railway as part of CN's sale of the entire Truro to Sydney line.
