= Pacific Junction, New Brunswick =

Coordinates: 46.14173°N 64.988573°W

Pacific Junction is a populated place and railway junction in Westmorland County, New Brunswick, Canada.

== 1936 murder ==
In 1936, three members of the Lake family were murdered in Pacific Junction: Philip Lake, his wife Bertha Lake and her son Jackie, 20 months old). Arthur Bannister and Daniel Bannister were subsequently convicted of first degree murder and executed by hanging.
