= 2001 Stewiacke Via derailment =

Railway incident in Nova Scotia, Canada

Stewiacke VIA train derailment

Details
- Date: April 12, 2001; 14:24 (UTC−03)
- Location: Stewiacke, Nova Scotia
- Coordinates: 45°8′17″N 63°21′02″W
- Country: Canada
- Line: Bedford Subdivision
- Operator: Via Rail
- Incident type: Derailment
- Cause: Tampered switch

Statistics
- Trains: 1
- Deaths: 0
- Injured: 22 (nine seriously)

The Stewiacke Via train derailment was a derailment that occurred on April 12, 2001 in downtown Stewiacke, Nova Scotia, Canada, resulting in 22 people being injured. The train was Via Rail's Ocean (train #15), travelling from Halifax, Nova Scotia to Montreal, Quebec and carrying 123 passengers and a crew of nine at the time of the incident. The derailment occurred approximately where the old Stewiacke station once stood, and was the result of a 13-year-old boy tampering with a railway switch. At the time of the derailment the train was travelling at 77 kilometres per hour (48 mph). The two locomotives, baggage car, and first coach remained on the main track; the nine following cars were diverted onto an industrial track and derailed. The crash resulted in the destruction of the dining car, the industrial track, and a farm supply outlet.

The train consist was made up of the following:
1. F40PH-2 Diesel-electric locomotive number 6405
2. F40PH-2 Diesel-electric locomotive number 6455
3. Baggage car number 8619
4. Coach number 8119
5. Coach number 8134
6. Coach number 8130
7. Coach number 8136
8. Skyline dome car number 8503
9. Dining car "Wascana" number 8417 (destroyed)
10. Sleeper car Château Rouville number 8225
11. Sleeper car Château Denonville number 8206
12. Sleeper car Château Latour number 8212
13. Sleeper car Château Verchères number 8228
14. Sleeper car Château Closse number 8205
15. Sleeper car Burton Manor number 8311
16. Laurentide Park car number 8709
