= List of Via Rail rolling stock =

This is a list of past and present rolling stock owned and operated by Via Rail in Canada. When Via began operation in 1976–1978 it was with a collection of equipment inherited from Canadian National (CN) and Canadian Pacific (CP), much of which remains in use on long-distance, regional and remote services. Over the years Via has supplemented this initial fleet with new orders and with acquisitions of secondhand equipment from other operators. The fleet used in the Québec City–Windsor Corridor was replaced between 2022 and 2025 by Siemens Charger locomotives and Siemens Venture cars, and in 2026 Via signed contracts with Stadler Rail and Alstom to replace the equipment used on its long-distance, regional and remote routes.

Via does not publish a unit-by-unit roster, and the aggregate figures it publishes differ according to the basis of measurement. Its 2025 annual report gives 70 locomotives and 294 train cars "in and out of service" as at 31 December 2025, together with all 32 new trainsets received for the Corridor. Its corporate fleet pages describe a fleet of "over 450 train cars and locomotives" and give nominal quantities by model that in several cases exceed those corporate totals. The tables below therefore give published fleet quantities together with their sources rather than a single active roster, and note where an active count has not been published.

== Locomotives ==
=== Current ===
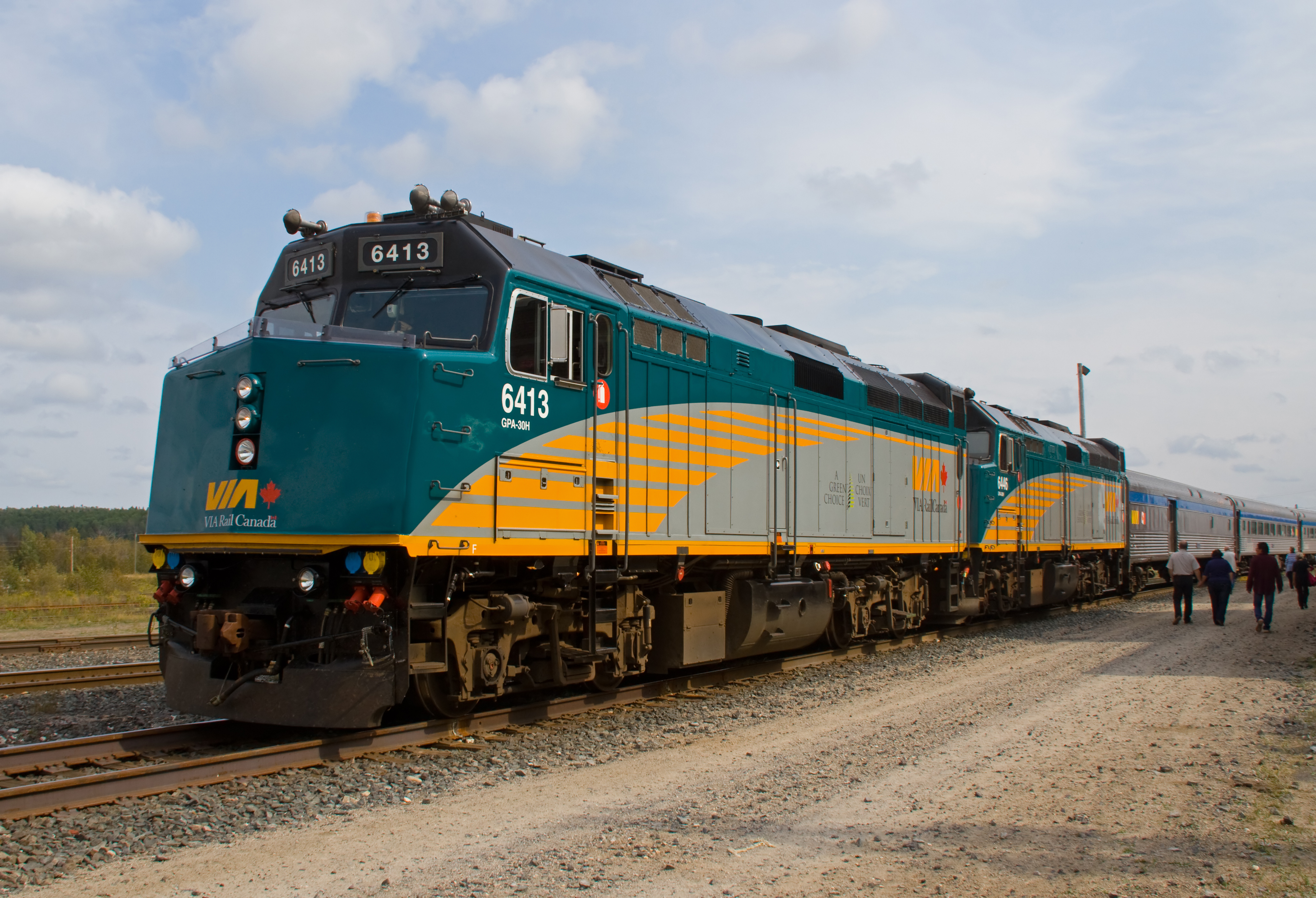
The GMD F40PH-2 is the mainstay of Via's long-distance fleet.

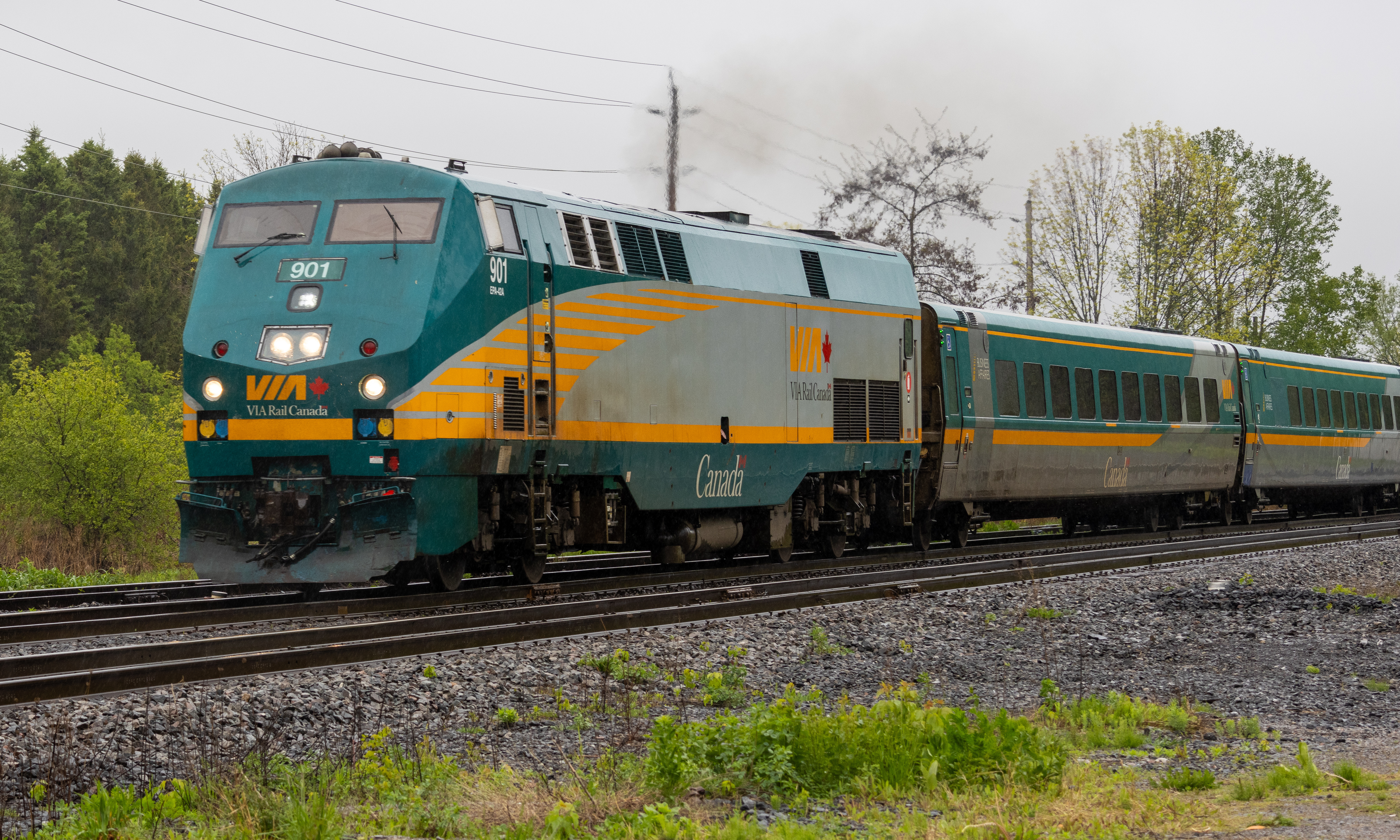
A GE P42DC at Newcastle, Ontario, in 2025

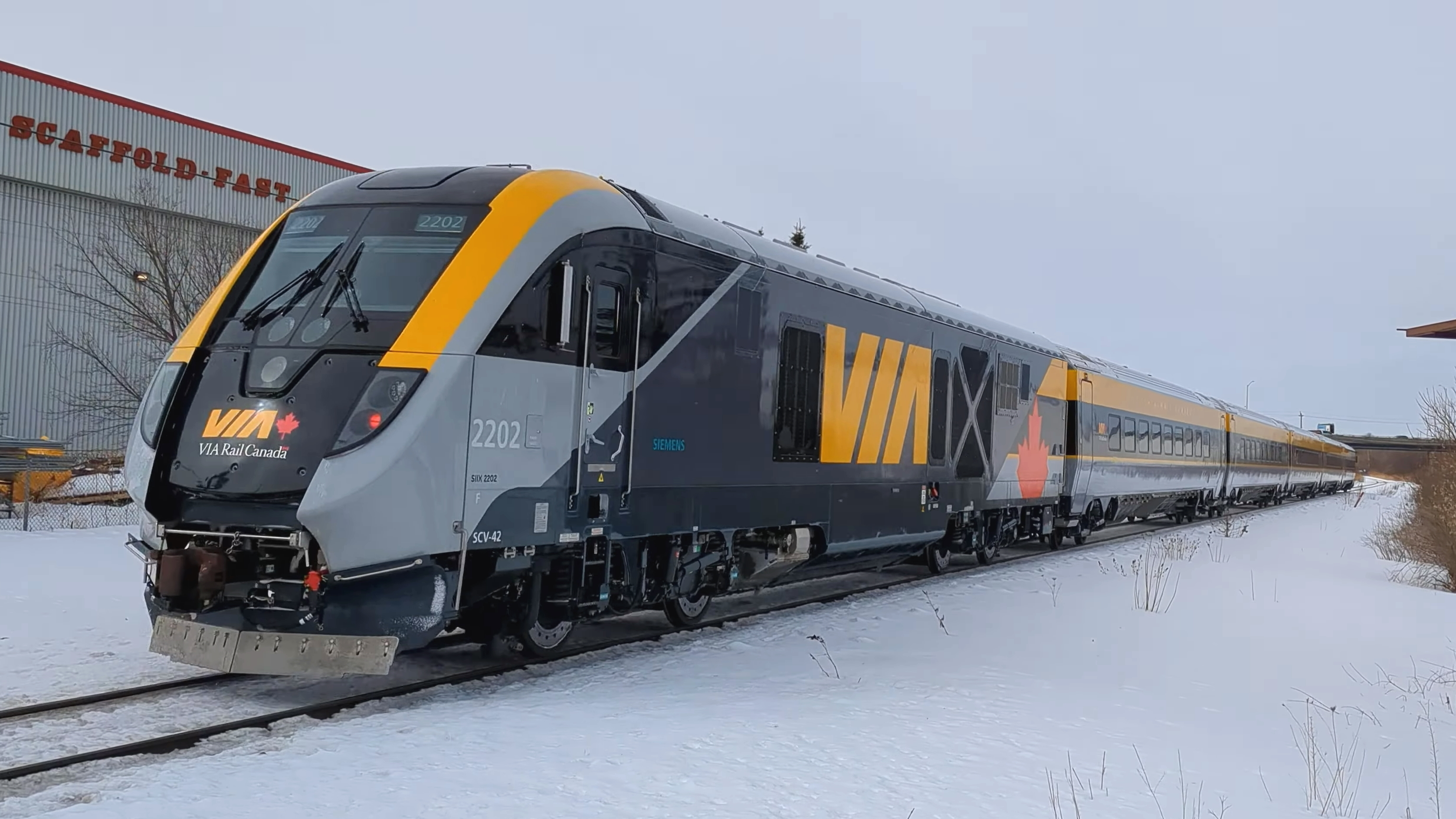
A Siemens Charger propelling a Venture trainset at Ottawa. The type replaced the previous Corridor fleet between 2022 and 2025.

Via operates diesel locomotives exclusively. Its fleet of F40PH-2 locomotives was built by General Motors Diesel between November 1987 and April 1989 and was rebuilt under a programme funded in 2007, which added a separate head end power generator. The GE P42DC fleet was built in 2001. Siemens Charger locomotives were introduced from 2022 to replace the equipment then used on Corridor services, and Via reported that commissioning of the new Corridor fleet was completed during 2025. Via also operates a small number of self-propelled Budd Rail Diesel Cars, which are listed separately below.

Model	Road numbers	Fleet quantity	Years of service	Notes
GMD F40PH-2	6400–6459	53	1987–present	Built November 1987 to April 1989. Rated at 3,000 hp with a 500 kW head-end power generator and a maximum speed of 145 to 153 km/h, units 6437 to 6458 being restricted to 145 km/h. The rebuilding programme, funded by the Government of Canada in 2007, covered 53 locomotives and added a separate head-end power generator and improved emissions controls. Number 6403 appeared on the Canadian $10 note issued from 2013 and was subsequently renumbered 6459. Locomotive 6400 led train 15 when it derailed at Saint-Charles-de-Bellechasse, Quebec, on 25 February 2010; the Transportation Safety Board of Canada reported that the lead locomotive was destroyed. Locomotive 6444 led train 92 when it derailed at Aldershot, Ontario, on 26 February 2012, rolling onto its side and striking a building foundation; the cab roof collapsed and the cab interior was extensively damaged. Units 6422, 6423, 6430, 6447 and 6450 were wrecked or retired before the rebuilding programme. Via does not publish how many units are active, stored or withdrawn.
GE P42DC	900–920	21	2001–present	Built October to December 2001. Rated at 4,250 hp with an 800 kW head-end power generator and a maximum speed of 160 km/h. Fitted with a third headlight below the numberboards. Via does not publish how many units are active, stored or withdrawn, and has not published the fleet's route assignments following completion of the Corridor fleet replacement.
Siemens Charger	2200–2231	32	2022–present	Operated in trainsets with Siemens Venture cars on the Québec City–Windsor Corridor. Powered by a Cummins QSK95 sixteen-cylinder diesel engine of 4,200 hp meeting EPA Tier 4 emission standards, with 600 kW head-end power, a maximum tractive effort of 290 kN and a design speed of 201 km/h, although passenger trains in Canada are limited to 160 km/h by track classification. All 32 had been delivered as at 31 December 2025. The designation SCV-42 is widely used for the Via variant, although Via's own material refers to the type as the Siemens Charger.
EMD SW1000	202	2	1978–present	Switchers used to move cars within the Montréal Maintenance Centre; they are not equipped to supply head-end power. Built by General Motors Electro-Motive Division between November 1966 and January 1967 and rated at 1,000 hp, with a maximum speed of 100 km/h. The units previously spent twenty years in the service of Inland Steel in Indiana. Via's fleet page gives two units without publishing their road numbers.

=== On order ===
On 29 July 2026 the Government of Canada announced a $1.95 billion investment to renew Via's long-distance, regional and remote locomotive fleet. The investment comprises $1.6 billion for 45 locomotives to be supplied by Stadler Rail and $357 million for a new assembly and maintenance facility to be built by Pomerleau at Via's Montréal Maintenance Centre. Stadler announced the contract the following day; it includes a twenty-year technical support and spare supply agreement.

The four-axle locomotives combine diesel-electric propulsion with a battery-assisted traction system. Stadler states that they will deliver up to 4 MW at the wheel, a starting tractive effort of 350 kN and a maximum speed of 160 km/h. The traction batteries supply onboard auxiliary systems, head-end power and traction, and store regenerated braking energy. The locomotives are designed to run in battery mode at stations and in other environmentally sensitive areas, and the battery system is intended to allow a locomotive to continue operating as far as a safe location following a failure of the diesel powertrain. The design envelope extends to −50 °C and draws on technology previously deployed in Sweden and Norway. The battery systems are to be supplied by ABB from its plant in Saint-Laurent, Quebec, and the locomotives are to retain the flexibility to use renewable diesel.

Stadler Valencia, at Albuixech in Spain, retains responsibility for the design, manufacture and delivery of the fleet, while part of the assembly together with testing and commissioning is to be carried out in Canada. Transport Canada states that the Montréal facility, expected to be completed in 2029, will support the final assembly, testing and commissioning of up to 36 of the locomotives before moving to long-term maintenance work. Transport Canada describes the fleet as North America's first hybrid-powered passenger locomotives. Support services are to be delivered through a Canadian subsidiary of Stadler with personnel based at Via's maintenance facilities in Montréal, Toronto, Winnipeg and Vancouver.

Model	Road numbers	Quantity	Schedule	Notes
Stadler Rail hybrid battery-diesel locomotive	Not announced	45	First units scheduled to enter commercial service in 2029; deployment scheduled to be complete in 2032	Model designation not announced. Intended for long-distance, regional and remote services.

=== Former ===
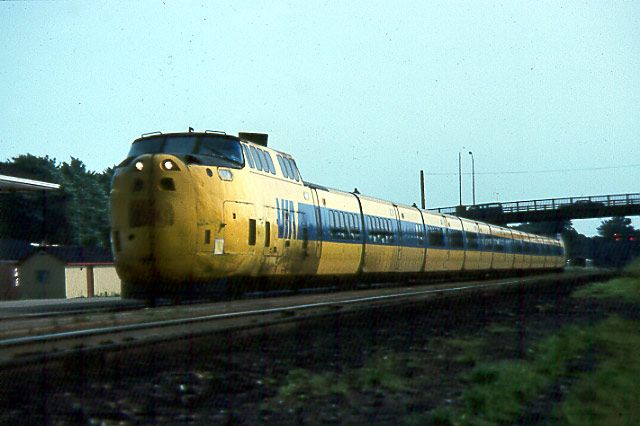
UAC TurboTrain passing Brockville in 1981.

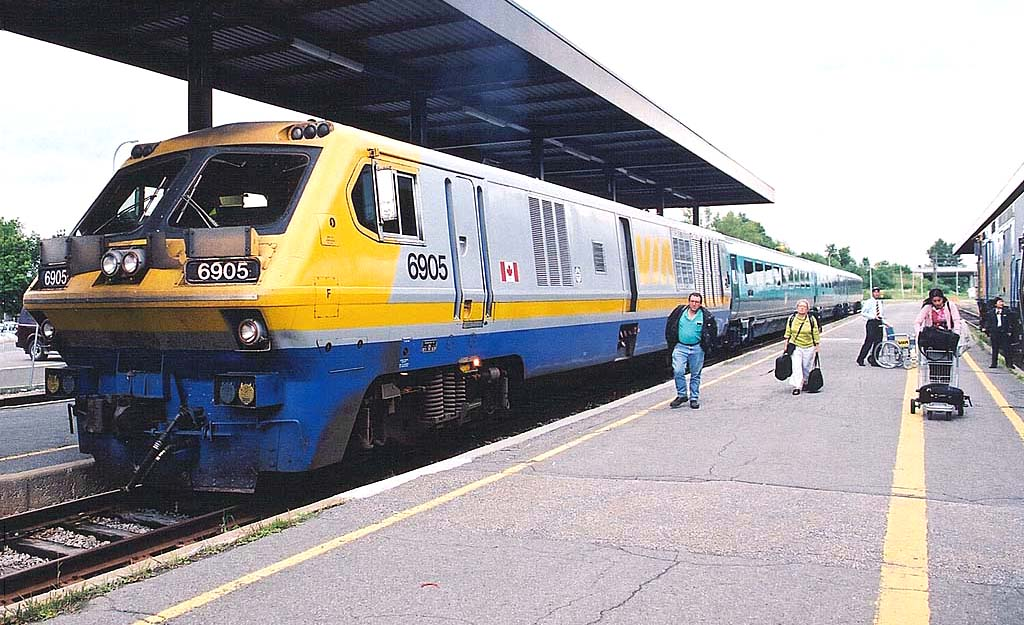
An LRC with prototype "Renaissance" equipment in 2000.

Via inherited a diverse fleet of diesel locomotives from Canadian National and Canadian Pacific. It also received UAC TurboTrain gas-turbine equipment. Between 1980 and 1984 Bombardier delivered 31 LRC ("Light, Rapid, Comfortable") diesel locomotives with matching cars: an initial 21 production units followed by ten more in 1984. The last examples were retired in 2001.

Model	Road numbers	Built	Years of service	Notes
UAC TurboTrain	125, 151	1968	1978–1982	Acquired from CN. The equipment was withdrawn in 1982 and none was preserved.
LRC-2	6900–6920	1980–1984	1980–2001	6917 was acquired by the Toronto Railway Historical Association and is one of two surviving LRC locomotives; the remainder were scrapped.
LRC-3	6921–6930	1980–1984	1980–2001	6921 is preserved at Exporail.
MLW FPA-2U	6758, 6759	1946–1959	1979–1987	Ex-CN. 6758 was previously numbered 6755 and delivered new as FPA-2 6711; 6759 was previously 6751 and delivered new as FPA-2 6707. 6758 was subsequently acquired by the New York and Lake Erie Railroad, which was still operating it on excursions in 2025.
MLW FPA-4	6760–6793	1946–1959	1979–1989	Ex-CN. The last example operated in early May 1989. Several were subsequently acquired by private train operators in the United States.
MLW FPB-4	6860–6871	1946–1959	1979–1989	Ex-CN. Cabless booster units, retired with the remaining FPA-4s in 1989.
GMD FP7	6501, 6509, 6521, 6566	1949–1953	1979–1986	Ex-CP. FP7Au 6566 was destroyed in the Hinton train collision in February 1986 and was retired during that year.
GMD FP9	1405–1407, 1409–1414	1954–1959	1979–2002	Ex-CN and CP. Fifteen units were later rebuilt as the FP9ARM class. F9B 6633 was destroyed in the Hinton train collision in February 1986 and was retired during that year. 6307 and 6313 later passed to Royal Canadian Pacific as 4106 and 4107. 6304 and 6311 are at Eastend, Saskatchewan.
GMD FP9ARM	6300–6314	1983–1985	1983–2002	Fifteen units rebuilt from Canadian National FP9As. Seven of them, 6300, 6302, 6304, 6307, 6308, 6311 and 6313, were fitted with head-end power equipment in 1997.
MLW RS-10	8558	1956	1978–1981	Conveyed from CP to Via in late 1978 and retired in 1981.
EMD E8	1800, 1802	1949	1978–1982	Conveyed from CP to Via in late 1978, renumbered 1898 and 1899 in 1980 and retired in 1982.
Budd RDC-1	6100–6148	1949–1962	1978–2000s	Ex-CN and CP. Former Via 6109 and 6120 later ran in Cuba. 6127 was sold to Dallas Area Rapid Transit.
Budd RDC-2	6200–6225	1949–1962	1978–2000s	Ex-CN and CP. Several cars passed to Industrial Rail Services Incorporated, which rebuilt some of them for Via and scrapped others following its bankruptcy.
Budd RDC-3	6350–6357	1949–1962	1978–2000s	Ex-CP and CN. Via describes the RDC-3 as partly for passengers and partly for baggage or postal use.
Budd RDC-9	6000–6006	1949–1962	1978–2000s	Ex-CP and CN. Via describes the RDC-9, also known as the RDC-5, as having no controls and a single engine, the type being used to add passenger capacity.
IC3	7001-7401-7201	1989	1996–1997	Two three-car sets were brought to North America for demonstration and operated by Via before being returned to service in Israel.

== Passenger cars ==
=== Siemens Venture ===
The 2018 Canadian federal budget included funding for the purchase of 32 trainsets to replace the equipment then used in Corridor service in Ontario and Quebec. Via issued a request for proposals in 2018, with delivery of the new rolling stock scheduled for 2022. In December 2018 Via ordered 32 five-car trainsets, a total of 160 cars, from Siemens Mobility for use on the Québec City–Windsor Corridor at a cost of $989 million, together with a fifteen-year technical services and parts agreement valued at $355.5 million. The cars were built at Siemens' plant in Sacramento, California. Similar equipment is used by Amtrak Midwest and Brightline in the United States and by Railjet services in Austria and the Czech Republic.

Each trainset is formed of one Siemens Charger locomotive and five Siemens Venture cars: two Business class cars, two Economy class cars and an Economy class cab car, the first cab cars operated by Via. Via describes the standard configuration as four coaches, one cab car and one locomotive, and states that the formation can be lengthened or shortened as required. A standard trainset seats 194 passengers in Economy class and 87 in Business class, with five mobility aid spaces and onboard wheelchair lifts. The paired number series denote position within a trainset rather than separate production batches.

The first trainset entered revenue service in 2022. Via reported that all 32 trainsets had been delivered as at 31 December 2025 and that it had completed the full commissioning of the new Corridor fleet during that year.

Position	Type	Built	Fleet numbers	Quantity	Image
1	Venture Business class car	2021–2025	2600–2631	32	
2	Venture Business class car	2021–2025	2700–2731	32	
3	Venture Economy class car	2021–2025	2900–2931	32	
4	Venture Economy class car	2021–2025	2800–2831	32	
5	Venture Economy class cab car	2021–2025	2300–2331	32	

=== Stainless steel ===
The core of Via's long-distance fleet is a collection of streamlined equipment originally built by the Budd Company for Canadian Pacific in the 1950s, together with cars acquired secondhand from Amtrak and other operators in the 1990s. Both groups were rebuilt by AMF to use head end power and are consequently referred to as the "HEP" fleet, the ex-Canadian Pacific long-distance cars being designated HEP1 and the later acquisitions HEP2. Via reported in its 2025 annual report that the average age of its cars was 77 years and that increased maintenance costs and reduced availability were to be expected until a replacement fleet was introduced.

Quantities in the table below are the fleet quantities published by Via for each model. Via does not publish how many cars of each type are active, stored or withdrawn.

Type	Built	Years of service	Fleet quantity	Fleet numbers	Notes	Image
"Galley" Business car	1947–1949	1993–present	10	4000–4009	Built by the Budd Company and acquired from Amtrak and other operators between 1989 and 2000, then rebuilt by AMF in the mid-1990s. Seats 56. Designated by Via as HEP2 Business cars.	
Economy class car	1947–1953	1993–present	23	4100–4125	Acquired from Amtrak and other operators between 1989 and 2000 and rebuilt by AMF in the mid-1990s. Originally built by the Budd Company. Seats 68. Designated by Via as HEP2 coaches. Cars 4123, 4124 and 4125 were converted into Business cars, numbered 4007, 4008 and 4009 respectively.	
Economy class car	1947–1955	1978–present	43	8100–8147	Mostly ex-Canadian Pacific, with some cars rebuilt from ex-American coaches. Built by the Budd Company and rebuilt in the mid-1990s by AMF. Seating for 62, or 60 in cars 8145 and 8147. Designated by Via as HEP1 coaches.	
Château series sleeping car	July–November 1954	1978–present	29	8201–8229	Ex-Canadian Pacific, built by the Budd Company and AMF and acquired in 1978. Each car contains three sets of upper and lower berths, eight single bedrooms, one triple bedroom, three double bedrooms, two common washrooms and a common shower. Named after figures associated with the first French and British colonies.	
Manor series sleeping car	November 1954–April 1955	1978–present	40	8301–8342	Ex-Canadian Pacific, built by the Budd Company and AMF and acquired in 1978. Each car contains three sets of upper and lower berths, four single bedrooms, six double bedrooms, two common washrooms and a common shower. Cars 8304 and 8323 do not appear in Via's current list.	
Park series sleeper-dome-observation car	August–October 1954	1978–present	14	8702–8718	Ex-Canadian Pacific, built by the Budd Company and AMF and acquired in August 1978. Each car contains one triple bedroom, three double bedrooms, 24 dome seats, a common washroom, a bar and a panoramic lounge at the rear. Named after Canadian parks. The former Sibley Park was donated to Exporail and Riding Mountain Park was sold in 2004. Four Park cars were reconfigured from 2014 to include a fully accessible cabin for two, accessible washroom and shower facilities and an onboard wheelchair lift.	
Dining car	February–April 1955	1978–present	13	8401–8418	Ex-Canadian Pacific, built by the Budd Company and AMF. Seats 48, or 44 in cars 8401, 8407, 8412 and 8413. Named after Canadian hotels.	
Skyline series dome car	November 1954–April 1955	1978–present	16	8500–8517	Ex-Canadian Pacific, built by the Budd Company and AMF and acquired in August 1978. Each car contains 24 seats in the dining room, 24 seats in the dome, a galley, a snack bar and a lounge.	

=== LRC ===
LRC was a series of lightweight tilting passenger cars built by Bombardier for short- and medium-distance intercity service in Ontario and Quebec. The LRC family included both locomotives and passenger carriages designed to work together, although the two could be used separately. The locomotives were retired in 2001. The cars have been withdrawn progressively as Siemens Charger and Venture equipment has been introduced. Via has not published the number of cars remaining in service or a date for the end of LRC operation.

Type	Years of service	Fleet numbers	Notes	Image
Business car	1984–present	3451–3478	44 or 56 seats. Some cars were refurbished into a 44-seat bi-directional configuration.	
Economy class car	1981–present	3300–3399	68 seats. Some cars were refurbished into a 44-seat bi-directional configuration.	

=== Renaissance ===
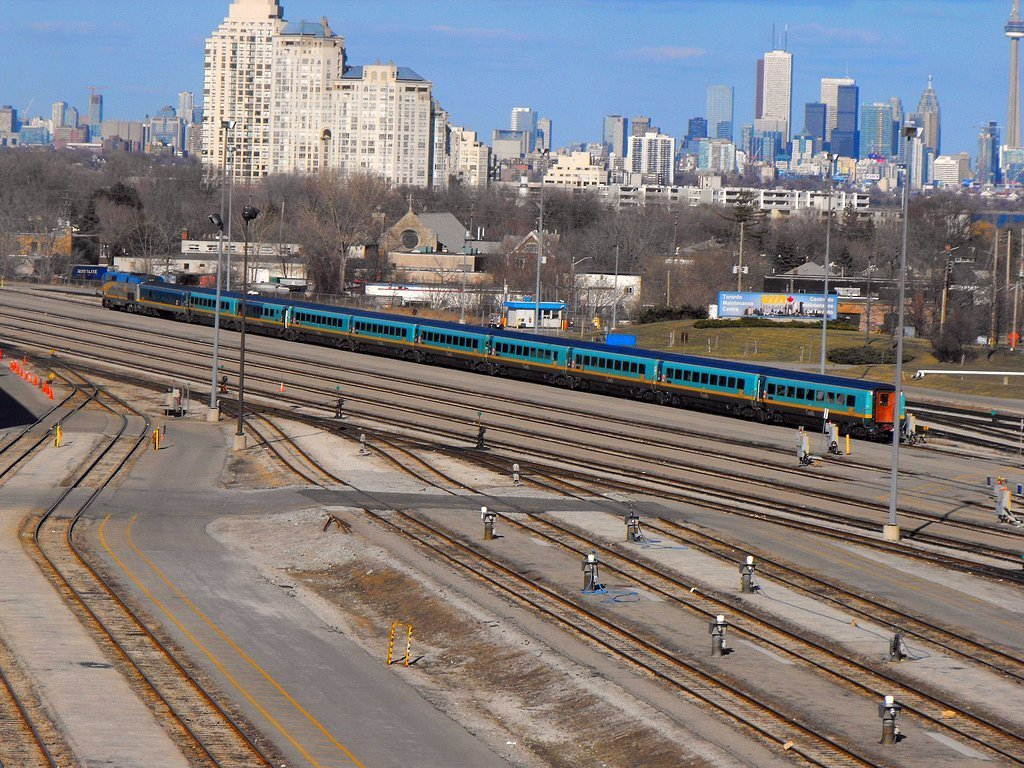
A GE P42DC with ten Renaissance coaches stabled in Toronto.

The Renaissance fleet was built by Metropolitan-Cammell in 1995 and 1996 for the proposed Nightstar overnight service between the United Kingdom and continental Europe through the Channel Tunnel. Via acquired the entire fleet in 2000 for C$130 million after the Nightstar concept was abandoned and entered the cars into service in the summer of 2002. The cars were built to a narrower British loading gauge than North American equipment, and dedicated transition cars are required to couple them to conventional stock.

As of 2026 Renaissance equipment is used on the Ocean between Montréal and Halifax, where Renaissance sleeping and dining cars operate in mixed consists with Budd HEP1 coaches and sleeping cars. Renaissance cars formerly used on Corridor services were displaced by Venture trainsets. Unoccupied Renaissance cars are also used as buffer cars in heritage-equipped consists.

Quantities other than for sleeping cars derive from fleet pages published in 2013 and require verification against Via's current material.

Type	Fleet quantity	Fleet numbers	Notes
Baggage car	9	7000–7011	Built from unused sleeping car shells.
Business car	14	7100–7114	48 seats in a 2+1 configuration.
Economy class car	33	7200–7232	48 seats in a 2+1 configuration. Modified to include a wheelchair tie-down and an accessible washroom.
Lounge car	20	7300–7316; 7354–7359	Referred to by Via as service cars.
Dining car	3	7400–7402	48 seats; built from unused sleeping car shells.
Sleeping car	27	7500–7589	Ten rooms with double occupancy. Each room has a toilet and half have showers. A fully accessible sleeping cabin is provided on each Ocean departure.
Baggage and transition car	3	7600–7602	Used to transition between coupler styles.

=== Rail Diesel Cars ===
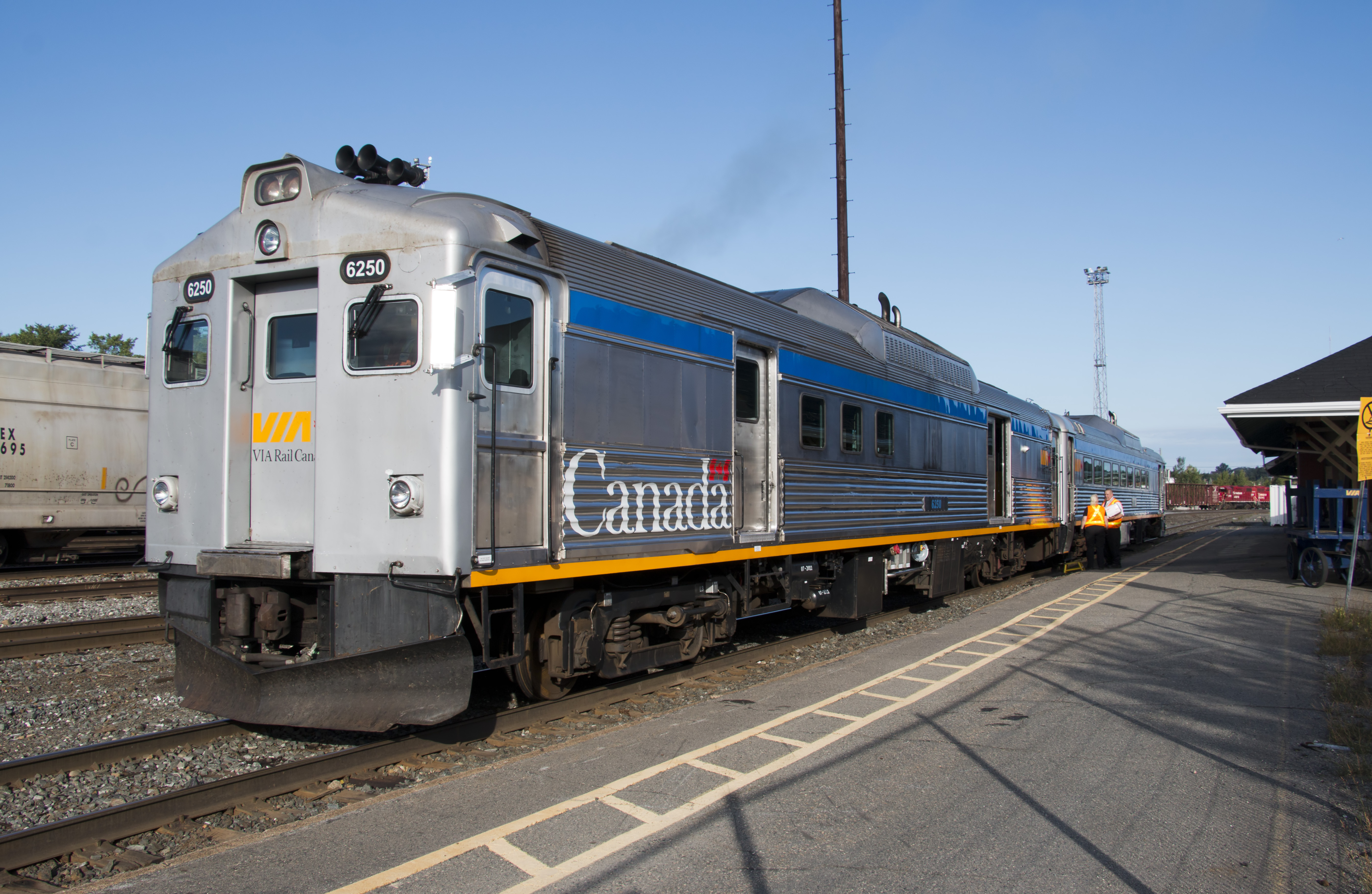
RDC-4 6250 at Sudbury, Ontario

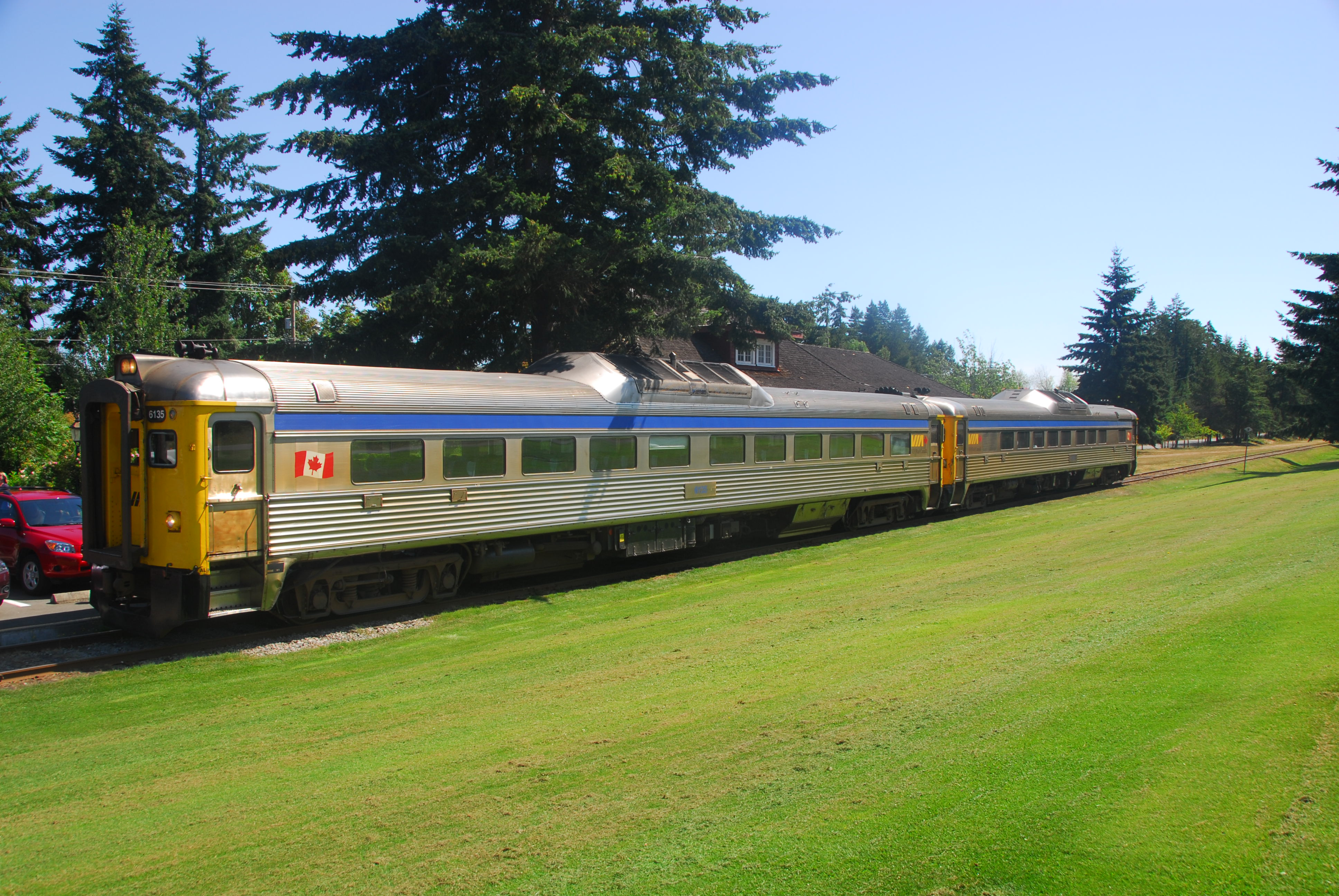
A pair of RDC-1s at Qualicum Beach on the now-discontinued Malahat service in 2009.

The Budd Rail Diesel Car is a self-propelled diesel multiple unit railcar, used extensively by both Canadian National and Canadian Pacific on outlying routes. Via's cars have two engines rated at 280 hp each, a 35 kW head-end power supply and a maximum speed of 136 km/h. Via describes its RDCs as the only examples anywhere still in regular service.

In 2010 Via contracted with Industrial Rail Services Incorporated for C$12.6 million to rebuild six cars, the work covering new seating, wheelchair accessible washrooms, LED interior lighting, controls, wiring, heating, air conditioning, braking systems and rebuilt engines meeting Euro 2 standards. The rebuilt cars had the control cab removed from one end so that passengers are not required to pass through the cab when boarding or alighting, and were fitted with diaphragms allowing movement between cars. Following the bankruptcy of Industrial Rail Services, the work was completed by Canadian Allied Diesel at the Moncton facility.

Via's fleet pages give three RDC-1s and two RDC-2s. Trade reporting identifies five serviceable cars, of which four are normally assigned to the Sudbury–White River service. The fleet's age has affected reliability: the service was suspended between 28 January and 21 February 2026 after the cars failed, Via having no substitute equipment available for the route.

Type	Built	Years of service	Fleet quantity	Fleet numbers	Notes
RDC-1	July 1956–June 1958	1979–present	3	6105	Built by the Budd Company. 6105 is rebuilt and normally assigned to Sudbury–White River; Via does not identify the other two cars.
RDC-2	July 1956–May 1958	1979–present	2	6217, 6219	Built by Canadian Car & Foundry under licence from the Budd Company. Both cars are rebuilt and normally assigned to Sudbury–White River. Via's fleet page refers to unit 6205 as one of the two remaining RDC-2s.
RDC-4	1955–1956	1978–present	2	6250, 6251	Baggage railcars carrying no passengers. 6251 was rebuilt from ex-CP 9251 in 2013 and is serviceable, although it is not normally in the Sudbury–White River rotation.

=== Other equipment ===
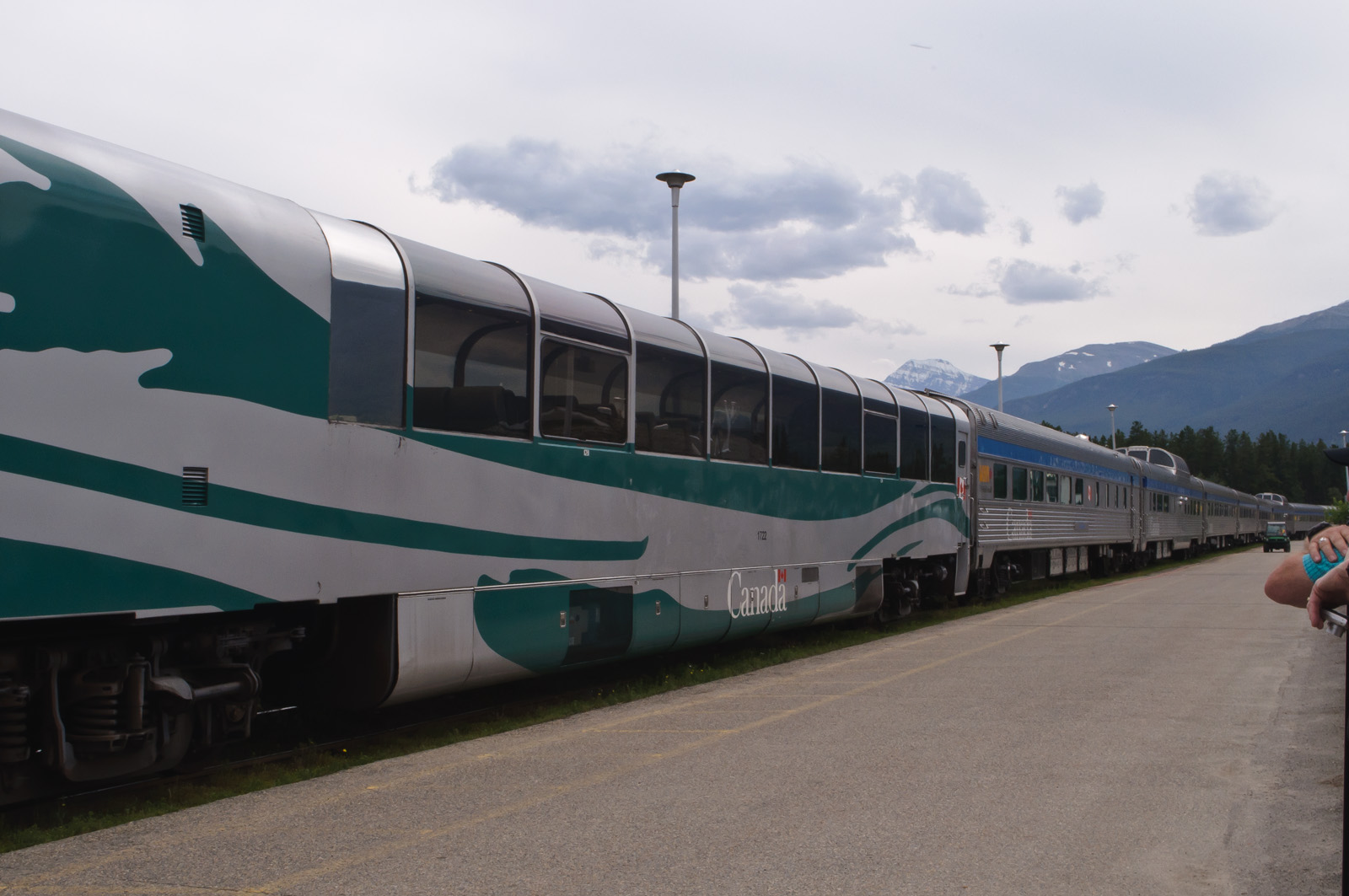
One of Via's three Colorado Railcar-built "Panorama" domes on the rear of the Canadian in 2012.

The cars listed below are of types acquired individually or in small numbers.

Type	Built	Years of service	Fleet quantity	Fleet numbers	Notes
Canadian Car & Foundry café and Economy class car	1954	1980–present	1	3248	72 seats and a snack bar. Acquired by Via between 1980 and 1983. Via states that the car belongs to Via Rail and is in the service of the Keewatin Railway Company, running only between The Pas and Pukatawagan, Manitoba, in a mixed consist of freight and passenger cars.
Canadian Car & Foundry baggage and Economy class car	1954	1978–present	2	5648–5649	Half seating and half baggage. Via states that these cars belong to Via Rail and are in the service of the Keewatin Railway Company between The Pas and Pukatawagan.
Colorado Railcar Single-Level Dome dome coach	2000	2002–present	3	1720–1722	Seats 71 to 74. Referred to by Via as Panorama cars. Built for the Florida Fun Train, completed for BC Rail in 2000 and acquired by Via in 2002. Operated seasonally until 2019. A refurbishment programme began in March 2023; the outcome has not been reported.
Canadian Car & Foundry lounge car	1954	2002–present	1	1750	Built as coach 5585 in 1954. After changing hands several times it was converted into a lounge car by BC Rail, which named it Glenfraser, and was purchased by Via from BC Rail in 2002. Via insulated the car for year-round operation in 2006.
Budd observation and Business car	1939	2002–present	1	1751	Acquired from BC Rail as 1750 Pavilion. Built in 1939 as Biscayne Bay and later named Memphis. Reported never to have entered service with Via and to be stored at the Montréal Maintenance Centre.
Budd baggage cars	1954–1955; 1963	1978–present	19	8600–8623	8600 to 8617 are ex-Canadian Pacific; 8618 to 8623 are ex-Union Pacific slab-side baggage cars.
National Steel baggage car	1951	1978–present	1	9631	Acquired by Via in August 1978. Via states that it has previously owned more than 67 cars of this type, and that 9631 is the only one of the series still in use, running on the mixed Winnipeg–Churchill train between The Pas and Pukatawagan.

=== On order ===
On 3 September 2026 Via Rail signed an agreement with Alstom for 313 passenger cars of the Adessia family, intended to be hauled by the separately procured Stadler locomotives on Via's long-distance, regional and remote routes. The agreement is valued at C$4.7 billion in total, comprising approximately C$4 billion for the rolling stock and nearly C$700 million for a fifteen-year technical support and spare parts supply agreement. The Government of Canada is funding the purchase. The specification was set out in a request for qualifications issued in December 2024, which sought more than 40 locomotives and 313 coaches of nine types.

Design and engineering are to be carried out at Alstom's facility in Saint-Bruno-de-Montarville, Quebec, with carbody manufacturing at La Pocatière, Quebec, and final assembly at Thunder Bay, Ontario. Alstom expects the contract to create or support up to 670 direct jobs. The fleet is intended for routes outside the Corridor, covering approximately 12,500 km across eight provinces and serving 93 Indigenous communities that have no alternative public surface transportation.

Alstom Adessia order
Car type	Quantity
Sleeper cars	78
Coach cars	58
Panorama cars	38
Baggage cars	29
Accessible sleeper cars	26
Dome cars	25
Dining cars	20
Prestige sleeper cars	20
Berth cars	19
Total	313

Transport Canada states that the cars are to be designed and tested for operation between −50 °C and 50 °C, including winter operation in remote and northern areas, and that at least 90 per cent of their materials are to be recoverable at the end of their service life. Accessibility requirements include accessible spaces in each class of service and an accessible travel path connecting cabins, washrooms, dining services and other principal onboard amenities. The Economy, Sleeper Plus and Prestige classes are to be retained. Alstom states that the cars will provide dome accommodation, full-service dining and social areas together with improved connectivity and cybersecurity protections.

The first cars are scheduled to enter commercial service in 2031, with deployment scheduled to be complete in 2035. The cars are to be introduced progressively and to operate alongside Via's existing equipment during the transition. Detailed technical specifications, including carbody construction, bogies, couplers, braking, seating capacities and interior layouts, have not been published.
