= The Ocean (train) =

Via Rail service between Montreal, Quebec and Halifax, Nova Scotia

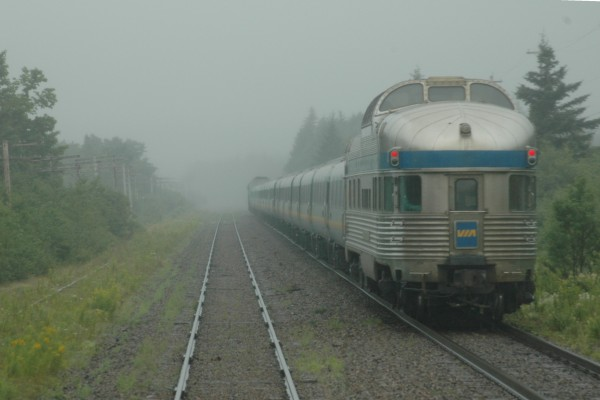
- A Park car brings up the rear of No. 14 at Belmont, Nova Scotia, on August 13, 2005. These were no longer in use as of 2021.

Overview
- Service type: Inter-city rail
- Status: Operating
- Locale: Quebec; New Brunswick; Nova Scotia, Canada
- Current operator: Via Rail (1978–)
- Former operators: ICR (1904–1918); CN (1918–1978)
- Ridership: 1,410 weekly (FY 2025)
- Annual ridership: 73,339 (FY 2025)
- Website: Via Rail - The Ocean

Route
- Termini: Montreal, Quebec; Halifax, Nova Scotia
- Distance travelled: 1,346 km (836 mi)
- Average journey time: 22 hours, 36 minutes (eastbound); 23 hours, 23 minutes (westbound)
- Service frequency: Three trips per direction per week
- Train number: 14/15

On-board services
- Classes: Economy and Sleeper Plus class
- Seating arrangements: No Reserved Economy seating
- Catering facilities: Dining car, service car (takeout counter)

Technical
- Rolling stock: F40PH locomotives; Skyline series
- Track gauge: 1,435 mm (4 ft 8 1/2 in)
- Track owner: CN (since 2008)

The Ocean (French: L'Océan), previously known as the Ocean Limited, is a passenger train operated by Via Rail in Canada on its Atlantic Canada route between Montreal, Quebec, and Halifax, Nova Scotia. It is the oldest continuously operated named passenger train in North America. The Ocean's schedule takes approximately 22 hours, running overnight in both directions. Together with The Canadian and Via's corridor trains, the Ocean provides a transcontinental service across Canada.

== History ==
=== Intercolonial Railway (1904–1918) ===
The Intercolonial Railway (ICR) inaugurated the Ocean Limited on July 3, 1904, as a summer-only "limited stop" service to supplement the Maritime Express. In Halifax, it connected with the Dominion Atlantic Railway's luxury train, the Flying Bluenose. During the immigration boom of the early 20th century, the Ocean Limited and other passenger trains on its route saw increased use as they provided key wintertime connections for both the Grand Trunk Railway and Canadian Pacific Railway in moving sponsored immigrants to lands in the Prairie provinces.

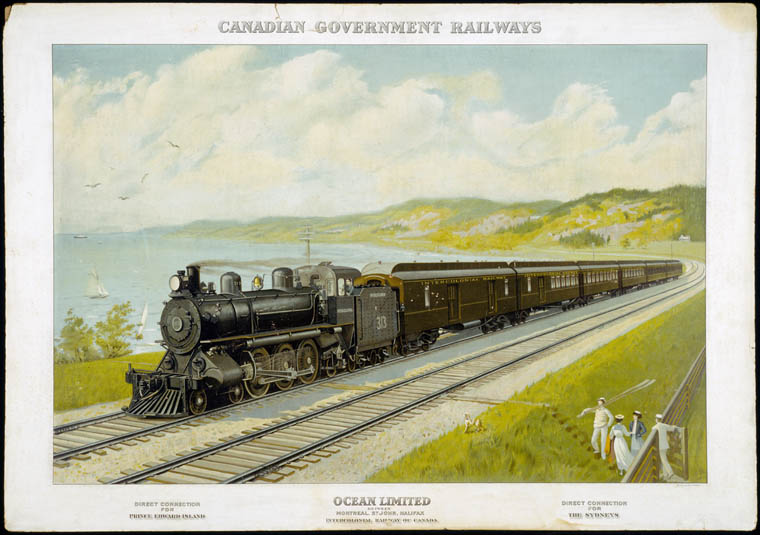
Ocean Limited promotional poster, c. 1915

=== Canadian National Railways/CN (1918–1978) ===
In 1918, the ICR was merged into the Canadian National Railways (CNR) and the Ocean Limited continued its operation much as before. During both the First and Second World Wars, the Ocean Limited provided important service to the port of Halifax.

In 1964 the Ocean received ex-Milwaukee Road Skytop Lounge lounge-sleeping cars.

CNR dropped the "Limited" from the train's name in 1966 as part of the company's adoption of bilingual names. Despite the name change references to the Ocean Limited remain commonplace.

During a landslide which affected the old IRC line near Rimouski, Quebec, in 1977, for six months CN diverted the Ocean onto another parallel line several hundred kilometres to the south, maintaining the same Halifax–Montreal schedule times.

=== Via Rail (1978–present) ===
In 1976, CN placed operation of its passenger services under a new division using the marketing slogan "Via". In April 1978 this division was split off as a separate Crown corporation named Via Rail Canada, taking with it all CN passenger trains and equipment. The new national passenger rail service did not begin to change train names and operations until 1979, following the October 1978 assumption of all CPR passenger trains and equipment.

The Ocean did not get renamed by Via, and in fact became supplanted on the Halifax–Moncton portion of its route in 1985 by another Via train, the Atlantic (formerly the Atlantic Limited), which saw its eastern terminus extended to Halifax from Saint John. This train also assumed the train numbers and equipment of the defunct CN passenger train Scotian, which survived only into the first few years of the Via era.

Under Via, the Ocean underwent several changes in its operation:

- (1979–1981) Daily operation (seven days a week) in both directions between Halifax-Montreal. Another Via train, the Atlantic also served these cities over a different route.
- (1981–1985) Daily operation (seven days a week) in both directions, albeit as the only through train between Halifax-Montreal, following cancellation of the Atlantic.
- (1985–1990) Daily operation (seven days a week) in both directions between Moncton and Montreal, following reinstatement of the Atlantic, which became the through train to Halifax. Passengers on the Ocean changed trains at Moncton.
- (1990–1994) Operation three days a week in both directions between Halifax and Montreal following Via budget cuts. The Atlantic also operated three days a week and equipment rotated on the two trains. Service between Moncton and Halifax and between Saint-Hyacinthe and Montreal, the only common portions of the two routes, was six days a week.
- (1994–2012) Daily operation (six days a week) in both directions between Halifax and Montreal. The second cancellation of the Atlantic resulted in increased operation on the route of the Ocean. CN sold its portion of the Ocean's route between Rivière-du-Loup, Quebec, and Moncton, New Brunswick, to a shortline operator which operated the section from Rivière-du-Loup to Campbellton as the Chemin de fer Matapédia et du Golfe and the section from Campbellton to Moncton as the New Brunswick East Coast Railway. CN re-acquired these portions on November 3, 2008, and, as a result, the Ocean now again operates solely on CN trackage.
- (1998) October 26, 1998, saw CN abandon its scenic route along the waterfront of Lévis, Quebec, which served the combined railway station and ferry terminal. This section of the railway was redeveloped as an urban cycling trail, although the former Lévis train station and platform remain. Via Rail was forced to relocate the Ocean stop for the Quebec City region to Charny, necessitating a reverse move in each direction. Via offers a connecting shuttle van service for Ocean passengers between Charny and Quebec City (in 2014 Via moved the stop from Charny to Sainte-Foy - both the eastbound and westbound trains travel in to Sainte-Foy forward, and reverse back to the main line).
- (2006) The gradual phasing out of the restored stainless steel Budd cars was to have taken place, with all departures in both directions to have been operated in favour of the more modern European-built Renaissance equipment. However, Via has had occasional problems with this equipment and has had to use the Budd cars. Work on upgrading the Renaissance fleet has resulted in the need to operate one Budd consist (with the two other consists Renaissance outfitted) during the winter season. This took place through to the winter of 2011–12, and ended after the service was reduced to three trips a week, with the exception of extra Budd-equipped trains during the Christmas holidays in 2014 and 2015. A stainless steel Park Car (originally built in 1954) was attached to the end of every train for passengers in Easterly Class (named "Sleeper Plus"). Though initially available only during the peak summer season and the Christmas holidays, the Park car was part of every train year-round. The Renaissance cars' European couplers made it necessary to insert a barrier vehicle known as a transition car (numbered 7600–7602) between the Renaissance sleeping cars and the Park car (or other Budd HEP cars). The transition car is converted from a Renaissance sleeper shell and is effectively an empty walk-through corridor with carpeted floor and handrails along the walls.
- (2012) On June 27, 2012, Via announced plans to reduce frequency of the Ocean from six to three times per week. Starting October 2012, the Ocean departed Montreal on Wednesdays, Fridays and Sundays, and departed Halifax on Tuesdays, Fridays and Sundays. The Tuesday departure from Halifax was later changed to Wednesday, so the departure days are the same in both directions.
- (2014) In 2014, CN threatened to abandon the Newcastle Subdivision, an action which would have jeopardized the Ocean. As part of an agreement, the government of New Brunswick announced it would give $25 million to CN to upgrade and maintain freight service on the line's northern and southern sections. CN committed to spend an equal amount to maintain and operate these two pieces for freight services for the next 15 years. However, a 71-kilometre (44 mi) section of track between Bathurst and Moncton was not part of the deal, and the lack of rail traffic initially kept this part of the route from being saved. However, in May 2014, the federal government pledged $10.3 million to rebuild the line to save the Ocean.
- (2014) The Ocean celebrates its 110th year of service.
- (2020) Via Rail shuts down the Ocean due to the COVID-19 pandemic.
- (2020) On November 1, 2020, Via Rail's lease with the Halifax Port turnaround loop ended, meaning the train is not able to make the return trip, jeopardizing the train's future.
- (2021) On August 11, 2021, the Ocean started a gradual return to service, departing once a week in Halifax and once a week in Montreal. Via Rail opted to have the locomotives in a back to back consist, something unique and atypical of them. However, this made the train able to return to Montreal despite not having a turnaround loop in Halifax. This change meant deleting the Park car from the consist.
- (2022) Starting June 3, 2022, Via Rail resumed a three-times-weekly schedule each way, with departures from both Montreal and Halifax on Wednesdays, Fridays and Sundays.
- (2022) Due to the ice storms of December 23, 2022, throughout much of eastern Canada, both Ocean trains departing from Montreal and Halifax were stuck in Campbellton and Rivière-du-Loup respectively for over 24 hours. Fallen trees and debris from the storm blocked the Mont-Joli Subdivision, and CN workers did not clear the tracks until mid-Christmas day, by which point both trains had already been ordered to return to their respective departure terminals. Via Rail gave out thousands of dollars' worth of vouchers and coupons to compensate affected customers.

=== Major incidents ===
Listed here are incidents involving significant injury to passengers or crew or damage to the train.

- Apparently, on March 31, 1927, the Ocean was stopped in a siding in Thomson Station, Nova Scotia when the Maritime Express (another scheduled passenger train between Montreal and Halifax) went through an open switch and collided with the train. The Maritime Express had been travelling at track speed; the Ocean's fireman was killed in the crash. The circumstances surrounding the crash are unclear.
- On April 12, 2001, at 2:24 pm, the westbound Ocean derailed in Stewiacke, Nova Scotia passing over an unlocked industrial track switch. Nine cars derailed, destroying the track, dining car, and a building next to the tracks. 22 of the 131 passengers and crew onboard the train were hospitalized; nine of those 22 were seriously injured.
- On July 3, 2008, at 6:37 pm, the Ocean collided with a CN local train on a limited-visibility curve just outside of the Via station in Halifax. The Via train (which had no passengers onboard) had just exited the loop track at the Halifax Ocean Terminal after performing the loop maneuver needed in order to depart Halifax in the correct orientation. There were no injuries, as both trains were travelling relatively slowly, but the two locomotives and first six cars of the Ocean were severely damaged.
- On April 4, 2019, at 12:35 pm, the last two cars of the eastbound Ocean derailed but remained upright while passing over the Lakeville Road grade crossing (milepost 15.27) in Coal Branch, New Brunswick. The derailment occurred due to corrosion in the north rail at the crossing, which progressively fractured as the 14-car train (and its two locomotives) passed over it. The train proceeded for a short distance until the crew became aware that the derailment had occurred. Three passengers were treated for minor injuries; besides the destroyed/damaged track, the deck of a bridge at milepost 14.9 was also damaged.
- On January 12, 2026, around 1:30 am, the eastbound Ocean was travelling through Saint-Alexandre-de-Kamouraska, Quebec (just southwest of Rivière-du-Loup) when it struck two tractor-trailers parked too close to the tracks. The train's two locomotives, a baggage car, and three sleeper cars derailed but stayed upright. None of the 124 people on board the train, nor the four people in the two trucks, were injured. The track sustained damage as a result of the derailment, causing the termination of the westbound Ocean. Passengers were eventually able to resume their journey by bus.

== Route ==
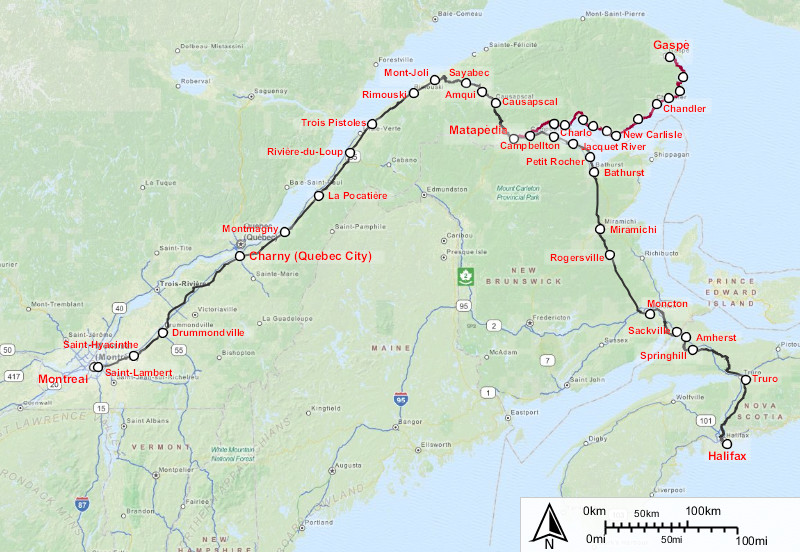
Train route (suspended Gaspé branch in brown)

The route taken by the Ocean runs through eastern Canada including the Island of Montreal and the city's skyline and suburbs, the lower St. Lawrence River valley, the Matapédia River valley, the south shore of Chaleur Bay and the forests of eastern New Brunswick, the Tantramar Marshes, the Cobequid Mountains and Wentworth Valley, the edge of Cobequid Bay and mixed farmland through central Nova Scotia to Halifax.

== Rolling stock ==
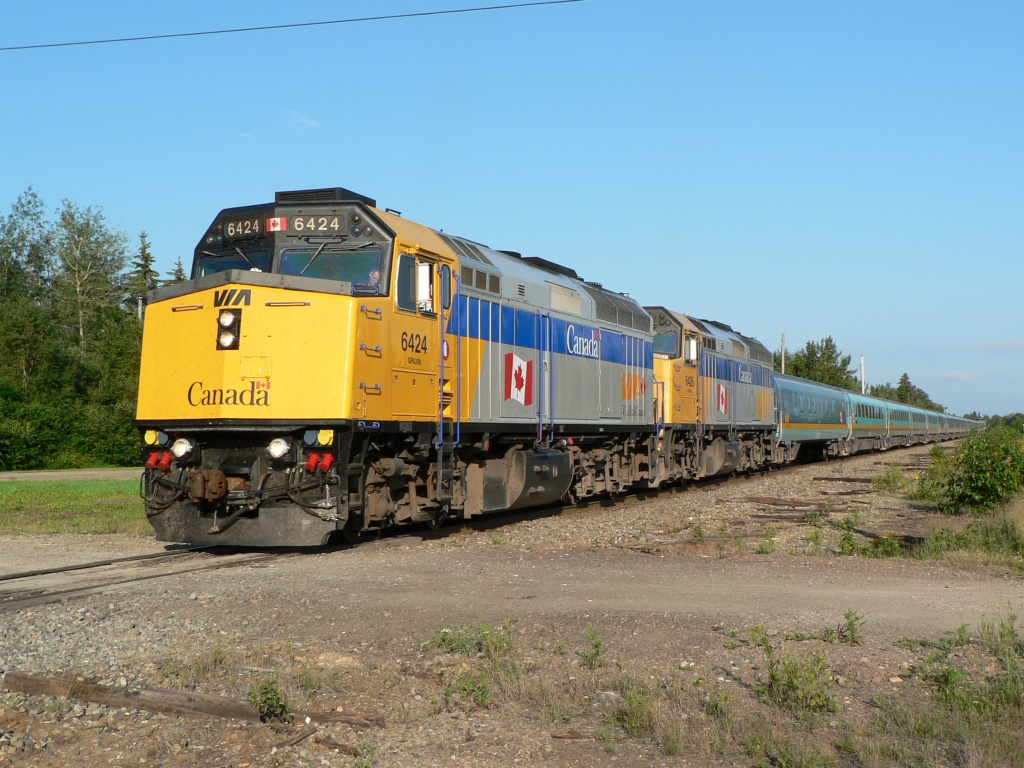
The Ocean at Jacquet River, New Brunswick, on July 31, 2006

Three Renaissance train-sets supported the Ocean route, but the reduction to three departures in each direction per week in late 2012 reduced the need to only two sets of equipment. These sets range from as few as 14 cars in the off season to as many as 21 cars during the peak summer period, and each includes a baggage car, several coach cars, a dining car bracketed by two service cars, multiple sleeping cars, a transition car (see discussion above) and (formerly) a Park sleeper buffet-lounge dome observation car. The Ocean is almost invariably hauled by a pair of London, Ontario-built GM F40PH locomotives, all of which CAD Railway Industries of Montreal has upgraded to the F40PH-3 model. A third locomotive is sometimes added in autumn and winter to help deal with difficult track conditions.

For several years prior to 2012, Via Rail removed one set of Renaissance equipment from service during the winter for upgrade work and replaced it with Budd-built stainless steel HEP1 equipment (including a baggage car, coaches, a Skyline dome car, a dining car, Château sleeper cars, and a Park car). This practice ended after the service reduction, as only two sets of equipment were required. However, in 2014 and again in 2015, Via added trains during the Christmas holiday period, which they ran using a set of HEP1 equipment much like in past years. These runs have been popular with railfans and the travelling public, as they provided more types of sleeping accommodations, a dome accessible to coach passengers, and a full dining car with meals cooked on board (a contrast to the catered meals in the normal Renaissance dining cars).

Prior to August 2013, the Ocean ran from Montreal to Matapédia, Quebec, joined to Train 16/17, the Montréal–Gaspé train (formerly called the Chaleur) three times per week. In Matapédia, the trains were separated with Train 16 continuing to the Gaspé peninsula and Train 14 (the Ocean) continuing to Halifax (and vice versa with Trains 15/17). Train 16/17 had its own locomotive which ran from Montreal, resulting in the combined trains (14 + 16 and 15 + 17) running with three locomotives between Montreal and Matapédia. The Montréal–Gaspé train used Budd-built stainless steel passenger cars, including a Skyline dome car. It was not possible to pass between the two trains when connected. Trains 16/17 were suspended due to infrastructure problems on the line to Gaspé, and service will not resume until the line is upgraded.

The balloon track at Halifax used to turn locomotives and passenger cars located in the Port of Halifax's South End Container Terminal was taken out of service in late 2020 to create more storage space for containers and the balloon tracks were severed in the fall of 2021. This necessitated certain operational changes to maintain service in both directions. The two F40PH locomotives are coupled back to back, unique for Via Rail trains, to enable the locomotives to couple on to the opposite end of train in Halifax for the return trip to Montreal. A result of the inability to turn the train set in Halifax is that the lead car on the eastbound Ocean (Train 14), typically a Renaissance baggage car, becomes the trailing car on the westbound Train 15 (in 2022, there is a second baggage car, a Budd HEP1 car, on the opposite end of the train). This situation has also resulted in the dropping of the iconic Park car (customarily the trailing car on Via's long-distance trains) from the Ocean train consist.
