= Stewiacke station =

Railway station in Nova Scotia, Canada

General information
- Coordinates: 45°8′17″N 63°21′02″W

History
- Opened: 1876- (Intercolonial Railway), 1918-1977- Canadian National Railways, 1977-1990 Via Rail
- Closed: 1990
Location

Stewiacke station was a railway station in Stewiacke, Nova Scotia, Canada. It served the Intercolonial Railway, Canadian National Railway and later Via Rail. In the 1970s and 1980s, it was served by Budd Rail Diesel Car passenger trains operated by CN and later Via until the end of RDC service in Nova Scotia in 1990.

On April 12, 2001, a local teenager, at home on a school in-service day, tampered with a railway switch on the CN Rail Halifax-Montreal mainline, causing Via Rail's train #15 Ocean to derail (2001 Stewiacke Via derailment) several minutes later when it passed through the centre of the community. Several buildings and rail cars were destroyed and many people were injured, including some severely, although no fatalities resulted.
