= Château series =

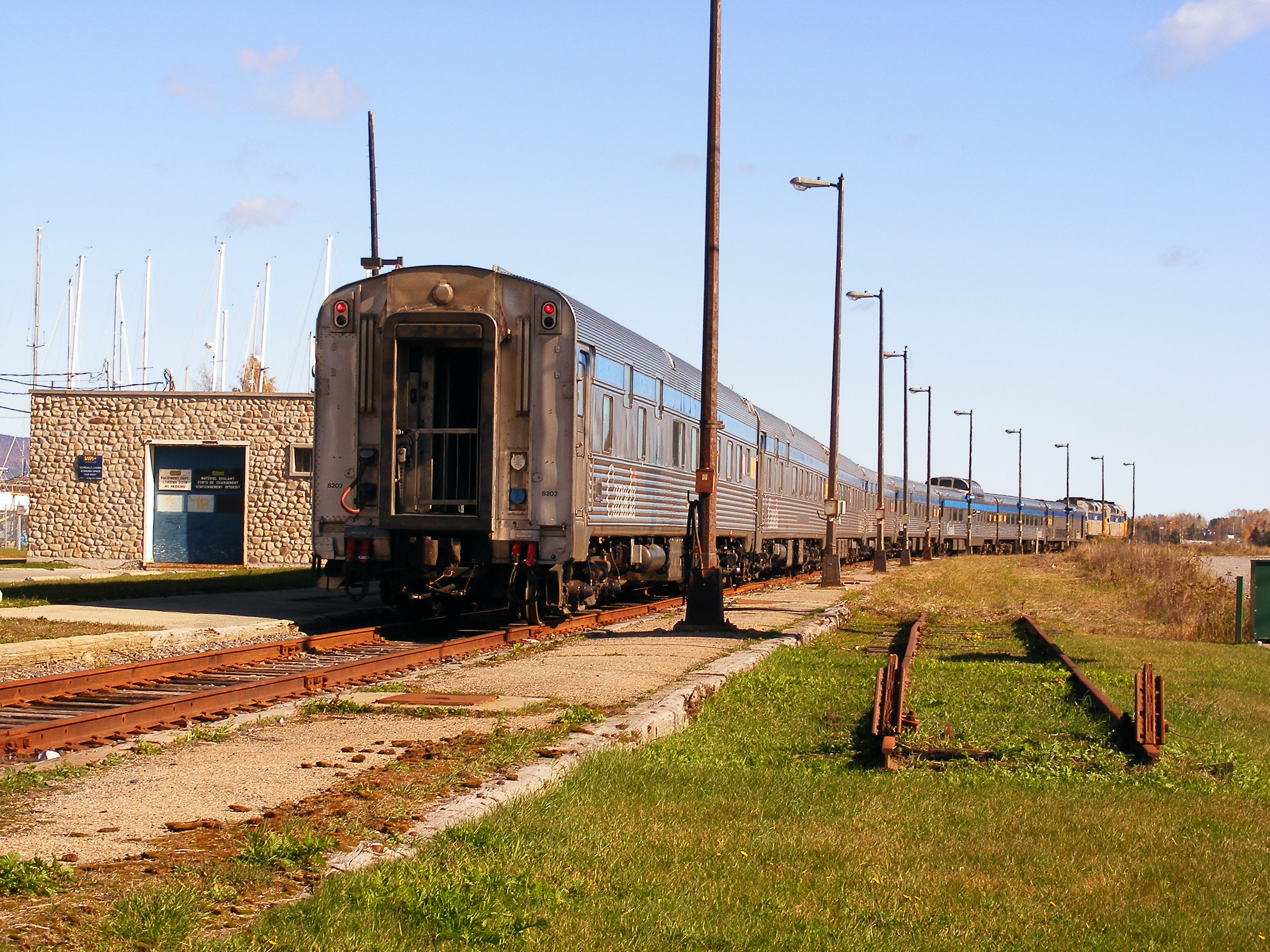
- Two Château series cars on the rear of the Chaleur at Gaspé in 2008
- In service: 1954–present
- Manufacturer: Budd
- Constructed: 1954
- Number built: 29
- Number in service: 29
- Capacity: 8 duplex roomettes; 3 sections; 3 bedrooms; 1 drawing room
- Operators: Canadian Pacific (1954–1978); Via Rail (1978–present)

Specifications
- Car body construction: Stainless steel
- Car length: 85 feet (26 m)
- Width: 10 feet 3/8 inch (3.058 m)
- Height: 13 feet 6 3/4 inches (4.134 m)
- Weight: 134,100 pounds (60,800 kg)

The Château series is a fleet of 29 lightweight streamlined sleeping cars built by the Budd Company for the Canadian Pacific Railway in 1954. Each contained eight duplex roomettes, four sections, three bedrooms, and one drawing room. The cars were named for distinguished French Canadians. Via Rail acquired the fleet from the Canadian Pacific in 1978 and the cars remain in active service.

== Design ==
The cars were constructed of stainless steel; save for a Tuscan red letterboard bearing the name "Canadian Pacific" they were unpainted. Each car was named for a distinguished French Canadian but did not carry numbers. As built each contained eight duplex roomettes, four sections, three bedrooms, and one drawing room for a maximum capacity of 25 passengers. The four open sections were located at the front of the car, followed by the three bedrooms and one drawing room, and then the eight duplex roomettes. Each of the rooms contained a private toilet. Under Via Rail the cars were rebuilt to include a communal shower at the cost of one section.

== Operation ==
Budd delivered 29 Château cars for the Canadian Pacific in 1954 as part of a massive 173-car order which equipped the new transcontinental Canadian and re-equipped the Dominion. The Château Bienville arrived in Montreal on July 4, 1954, both the first of the Château series and the first car of the Budd order. It and the Banff Park, the first Park series car, were sent on a cross-Canada publicity tour. Via Rail acquired the entire fleet from Canadian Pacific in 1978. As of 2015 all 29 remain on the roster and are assigned to the Montreal – Gaspé train and Winnipeg – Churchill train and the Ocean between Montreal and Halifax when Renaissance cars are not available or during winter.

== See also ==
- Château car floor plan
- Château Series fleet list
