= Skyline series =

Class of Canadian coach-dome cars

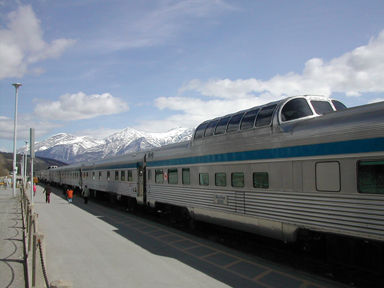
- A Skyline dome on the Canadian at Jasper in 2006
- In service: 1954–present
- Manufacturer: Budd
- Constructed: 1954–55
- Number built: 18
- Number in service: 16
- Capacity: 73 (original); 48 (current)
- Operators: Canadian Pacific (1954–1978); Delaware and Hudson (1974–75); Via Rail (1978–present)

Specifications
- Car body construction: Stainless steel
- Car length: 85 feet (26 m)
- Width: 10 feet 3/8 inch (3.058 m)
- Height: 15 feet 10 inches (4.83 m)
- Weight: 146,100 pounds (66,300 kg)

The Skyline series is a fleet of 18 lightweight streamlined dome-buffet-lounge cars built by the Budd Company for the Canadian Pacific Railway in 1954–55. Via Rail acquired the fleet from the Canadian Pacific in 1978 and the cars remain in active service.

== Design ==
The cars were constructed of stainless steel; save for a Tuscan red letterboard bearing the name "Canadian Pacific" they were unpainted. The cars were dubbed "Skyline" and numbered 500–517 but did not carry individual names. In their original configuration the cars had three separate sections: the dome seating area, a second seating area on the lower level, and a lounge area. The dome area sat 24. On the lower level, there was a 26-seat passenger area. Behind that was a small kitchen and small buffet area. At the end of the car was the "Skyline Coffee Shop", a 17-seat buffet area with "curved settees, banquette seats and tables."

In 1982 Via eliminated the lower-level passenger section and small buffet area, replacing them with a dining room and snack bar, respectively.

== Operation ==
Budd delivered 18 Skyline cars for the Canadian Pacific in 1954–55 as part of a massive 173-car order which equipped the new transcontinental Canadian and re-equipped the Dominion. The Delaware and Hudson Railway leased two cars from the Canadian Pacific in 1974 for use on Amtrak's new Adirondack. The D&H repainted the cars in blue and yellow. Via Rail acquired the entire fleet from Canadian Pacific in 1978. As of 2015 16 remain on the roster.

== See also ==
- List of Via Rail rolling stock
