= Park series =

Canadian streamlined dome-sleeper-observation cars

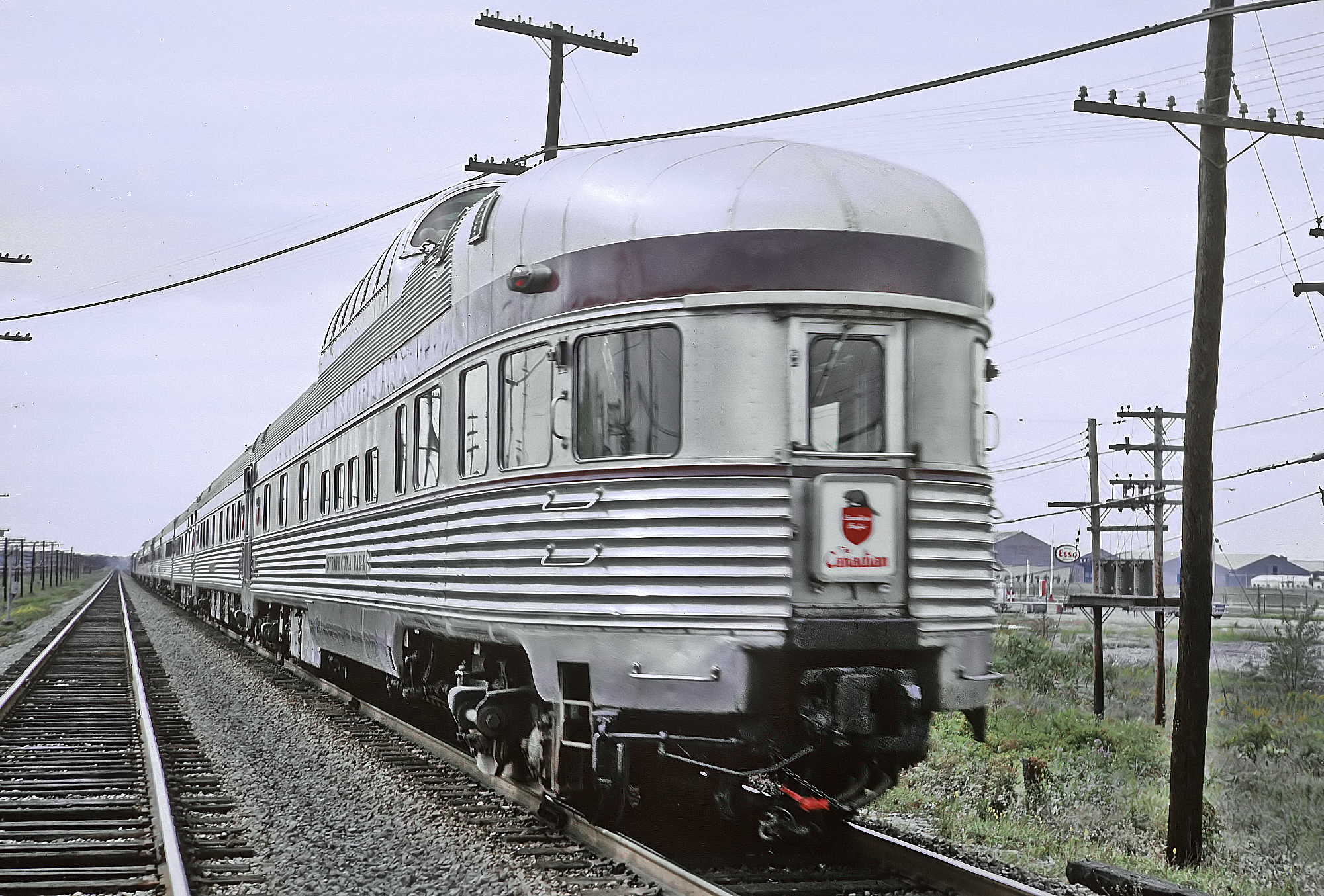
- Strathcona Park on the rear of the Canadian in 1965

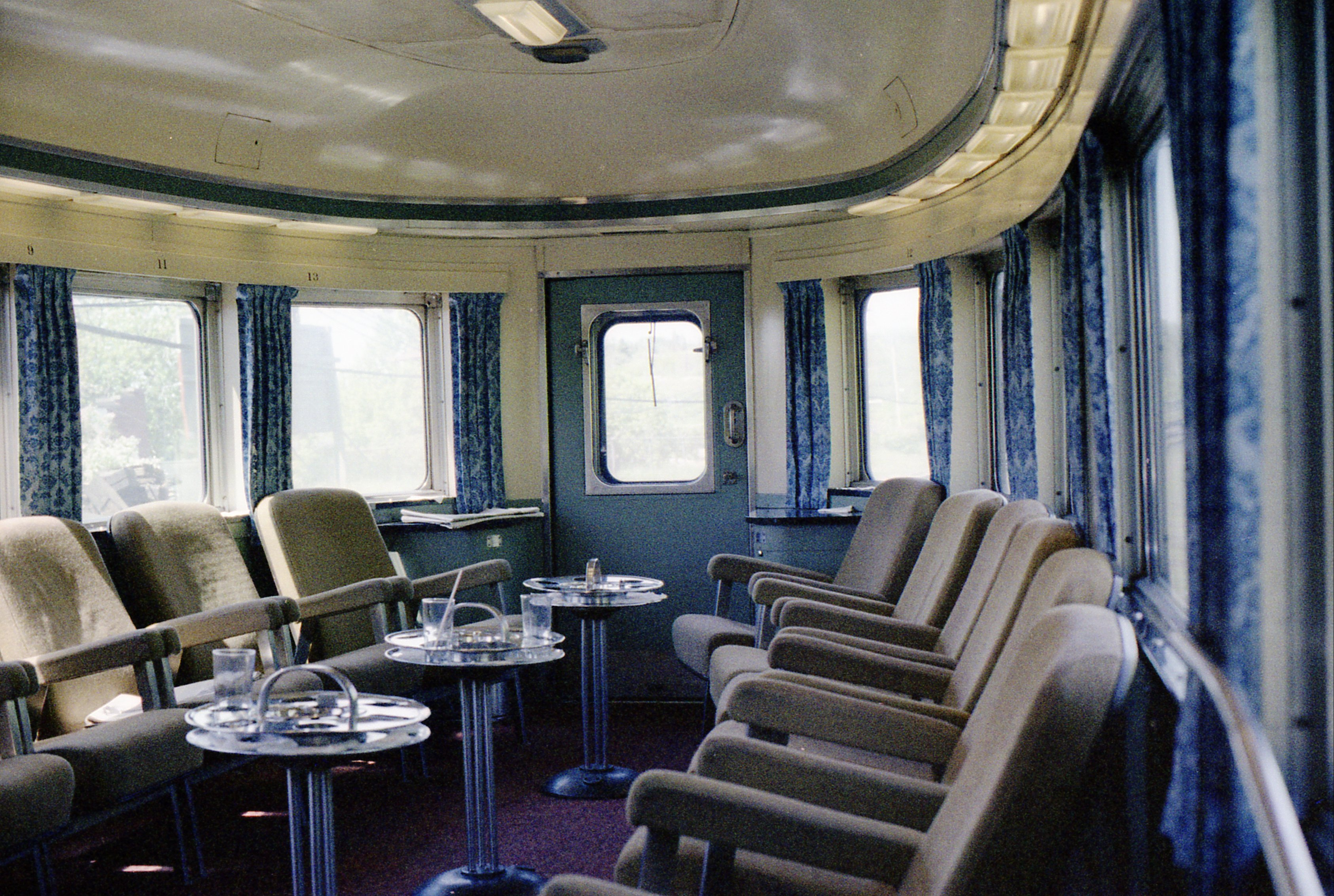
- Interior of Algonquin Park in 1978
- In service: 1954–present
- Manufacturer: Budd
- Constructed: 1954
- Number built: 18
- Number in service: 14
- Capacity: 3 double bedrooms; 1 triple bedroom
- Operators: Canadian Pacific (1954–1978); Via Rail (1978-Present); Tennessee Valley Railroad Museum (2008- Present)

Specifications
- Car body construction: Stainless steel
- Car length: 85 feet (26 m)
- Width: 10 feet 3/8 inch (3.058 m)
- Height: 15 feet 10 inches (4.83 m)

The Park series or Park car is a fleet of lightweight streamlined dome-sleeper-observation cars built by the Budd Company for the Canadian Pacific Railway in 1954. Sixteen of the cars were named for a Canadian national or provincial park, while one was named for a wildlife reserve, and one was named for what was at the time a private park owned by Canadian Pacific subsidiary Dominion Atlantic Railway, but is now one of the National Historic Sites of Canada. Via Rail acquired the fleet from Canadian Pacific in 1978 and the majority of the cars remain in active service.

== Design ==
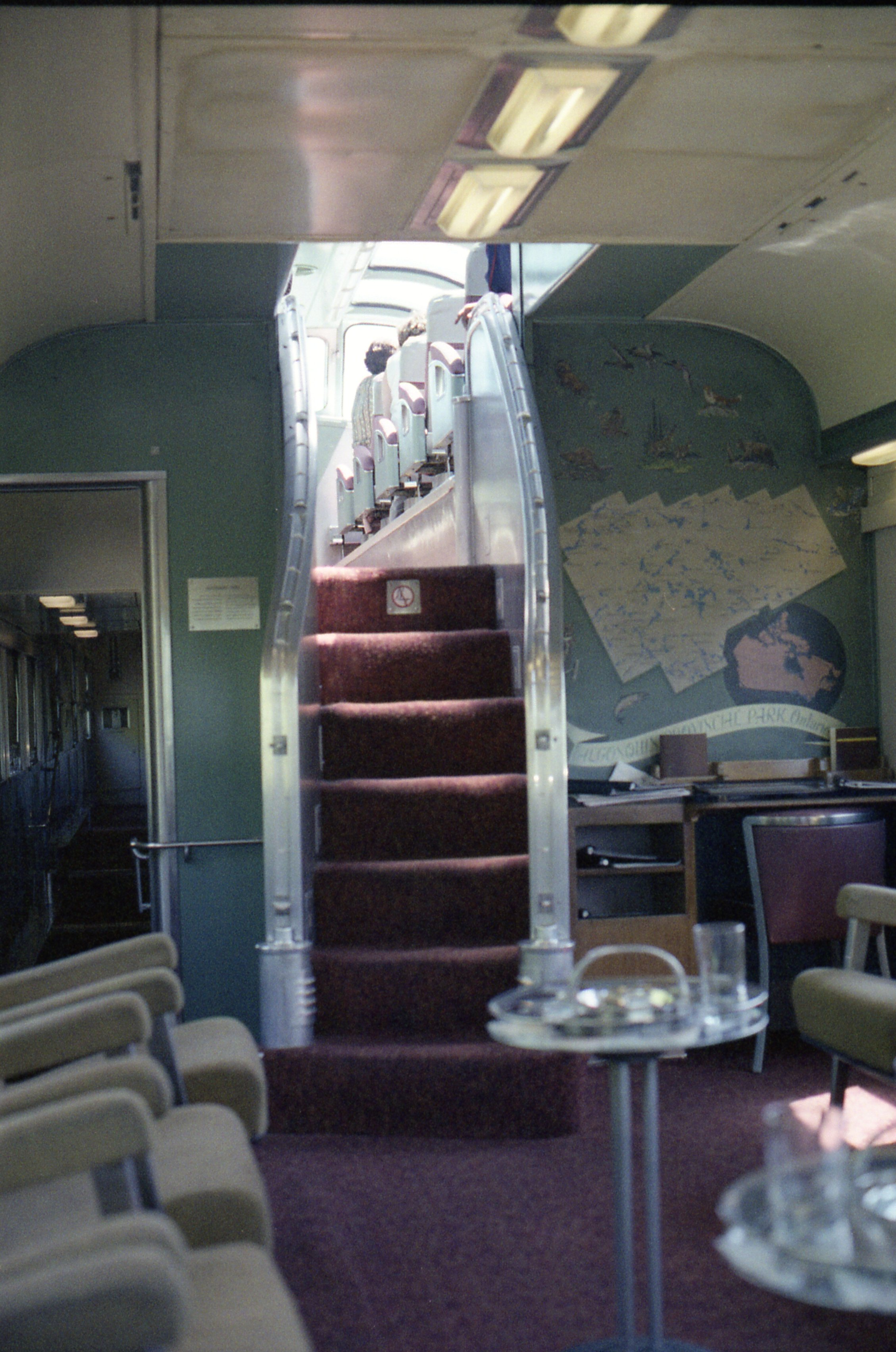
The observation lounge looking forward towards the staircase to the dome section with the map of Algonquin Park above the writing desk. June 1979

The cars were constructed of stainless steel; save for a Tuscan red letterboard bearing the name "Canadian Pacific" they were unpainted. Each car was named for a Canadian national or provincial park; CP assigned numbers in the 15400-series, but the cars did not carry them. The interiors were largely plastic, including the handrails up to the dome area. Inside at the front of the car were four private rooms: three double bedrooms (D, C, and B) and one drawing room (A). A single corridor on the left hand side of the car led past the 12-seat beverage room or "Mural Lounge" (under the dome), and led to the 13-seat observation lounge at the rear of the car; a short flight of stairs was located centrally at the front of the observation lounge which led up to the dome, with seating for 24.

An initial proposal for each car to have its own decorative scheme was rejected on cost ground; instead there were two schemes: "O" and "P"; both of which were developed by Harbeson, Hough, Livingston and Larson, a firm of architects in Philadelphia frequently used by Budd. Additionally, a leading Canadian artist was commissioned to produce two murals for the beverage room: a main mural 81 3/8 by 41 in (2,070 by 1,040 mm) for the front wall, and an auxiliary mural 163 by 45 in (4,100 by 1,100 mm) for the right hand (window-side) wall. In addition, they were asked to provide a 3 by 5 ft (0.91 by 1.52 m) decorative map for the observation lounge which was mounted above the writing desk to the right of the dome staircase. Both related to the Park the car was named after. At the time of their construction in 1954 the listed capacity throughout the car was 54 persons. Via removed the murals in 1986. Via rebuilt the cars in the early 1990s, converting them to Head End Power (HEP), and renumbering them into the 8700-series. They also added a panel of clocks to the observation lounge showing the different time zones in Canada.

== Fleet list ==
Table of cars
CP No.	Via No. (1979)	Via No. (HEP)	Name	Park	Decor	Artist	Notes
15401	15501	—	Algonquin Park	Algonquin Provincial Park	P	A. J. Casson	Leased to Tennessee Valley Railroad Museum
15402	15502	8702	Assiniboine Park	Assiniboine Provincial Park	O	George Franklin Arbuckle	
15403	15503	8703	Banff Park	Banff National Park	P	Charles Comfort	
15404	15504	8704	Evangeline Park	private park, now Grand-Pré National Historic Site	O	Harry Leslie Smith	
15405	—	—	Fundy Park	Fundy National Park	O	Lawren P. Harris	Wrecked in 1959
15406	15506	8706	Glacier Park	Glacier National Park	P	Adam Sherriff Scott	
15407	15507	8707	Kokanee Park	Kokanee Glacier Provincial Park	O	A. Y. Jackson	Featured in the 1976 film Silver Streak
15408	15508	8708	Jasper Park	Jasper National Park	P	George Pepper	Originally Kootenay Park
15409	15509	8709	Laurentide Park	Laurentides Wildlife Reserve	O	Albert Edward Cloutier	
15410	15510	8710	Prince Albert Park	Prince Albert National Park	P	Frederick James Finley	
15411	15511	8711	Revelstoke Park	Mount Revelstoke National Park	P	Robert Pilot	
15412	15512	—	Riding Mountain Park	Riding Mountain National Park	P	William Arthur Winter	Owned by Fort Wayne Railroad Historical Society
15413	15513	—	Sibley Park	Sibley Provincial Park	O	Yvonne McKague Housser	Owned by Canadian Railway Museum
15414	15514	8714	Strathcona Park	Strathcona Provincial Park	O	Walter J. Phillips	Scrapped 2024
15415	15515	8715	Tremblant Park	Mont-Tremblant National Park	O	Edwin Holgate	
15416	15516	8716	Tweedsmuir Park	Tweedsmuir Provincial Park	O	E. J. Hughes	
15417	15517	8717	Waterton Park	Waterton Lakes National Park	P	Llewellyn Petley-Jones	Scrapped 2023
15418	15518	8718	Yoho Park	Yoho National Park	P	Thomas Harold Beament	

== Operation ==
Budd delivered 18 Park cars for the Canadian Pacific in 1954 as part of a massive 173-car order which equipped the new transcontinental Canadian and re-equipped the Dominion. The first car to enter service was the Banff Park. Fundy Park was wrecked in a collision on the Dominion at Gull Lake, Saskatchewan, in 1959. Via Rail acquired the remaining 17 Park cars from Canadian Pacific in 1978. As of 2015 14 remain on the roster. They are always assigned to the Canadian and the Jasper – Prince Rupert train, and can also be found on the Ocean and the Winnipeg – Churchill train. The three cars listed in the Preserved section below were in service until VIA converted the ex CPR Budd equipment to HEP in the early 1990s. They were stored at Ottawa station for many years until disposition by VIA.

== Preserved ==
Several Park cars are no longer in regular revenue service:

- Algonquin Park is leased to the Tennessee Valley Railroad Museum for service out of Delano, Tennessee.
- Sibley Park is at the Canadian Railway Museum in Saint-Constant, Quebec.
- Riding Mountain Park is owned by the Fort Wayne Railroad Historical Society and it is currently undergoing mechanical restoration.

The murals were removed from all the cars still in service in 1986 and moved to the Canada Science and Technology Museum.

== See also ==
- List of Via Rail rolling stock
